= Results of the 1901 Western Australian state election =

This is a list of the results of the 1901 state election in Western Australia, listed by electoral district.

== Results by electoral district ==
=== Albany ===
1901 Western Australian state election: Albany
Party	Candidate	Votes	%	±%
Opposition	James Gardiner	590	69.2	+21.1
Opposition	William Nutting	263	30.8	+30.8
Total formal votes		853	99.3	+0.4
Informal votes		6	0.7	–0.4
Turnout		859	51.5	+0.8
Opposition hold		Swing	N/A	

=== Beverley ===
1901 Western Australian state election: Beverley
Party	Candidate	Votes	%	±%
Ministerialist	Charles Harper	151	53.0	–10.4
Ministerialist	Hugh Edmiston	134	47.0	+47.0
Total formal votes		285	97.9	+1.3
Informal votes		6	2.1	–1.3
Turnout		291	57.6	+3.0
Ministerialist hold		Swing	N/A	

=== Boulder ===
1901 Western Australian state election: Boulder
Party	Candidate	Votes	%	±%
Opposition	John Hopkins	628	56.2	+56.2
Labour	George Wiles	414	37.0	+37.0
Opposition	John Keegan	76	6.8	+6.8
Total formal votes		1,118	99.0	n/a
Informal votes		11	1.0	n/a
Turnout		1,129	55.9	n/a
Opposition win		(new seat)		

=== Bunbury ===
1901 Western Australian state election: Bunbury
Party	Candidate	Votes	%	±%
Ministerialist	Thomas Hayward	459	50.9	+50.9
Ministerialist	Newton Moore	409	45.3	+45.3
Opposition	James Port	34	3.8	+3.8
Total formal votes		902	98.5	n/a
Informal votes		14	1.5	n/a
Turnout		916	63.5	n/a
Ministerialist hold		Swing	N/A	

=== Claremont ===
1901 Western Australian state election: Claremont
Party	Candidate	Votes	%	±%
Ministerialist	William Sayer	551	38.1	+38.1
Opposition	Joseph Langsford	497	34.4	+34.4
Opposition	Andrew Henning	397	27.5	+27.5
Total formal votes		1,445	99.2	n/a
Informal votes		11	0.8	n/a
Turnout		1,456	52.9	n/a
Ministerialist win		(new seat)		

=== Cockburn Sound ===
1901 Western Australian state election: Cockburn Sound
Party	Candidate	Votes	%	±%
Opposition	Francis McDonald	290	44.3	+44.3
Opposition	Henry Barker	174	26.6	+26.6
Labour	Alexander McDougall	127	19.4	+19.4
Independent	Richard Birch	58	8.9	+8.9
Independent	James Simpson	6	0.9	+0.9
Total formal votes		655	97.9	n/a
Informal votes		14	2.1	n/a
Turnout		669	49.2	n/a
Opposition win		(new seat)		

=== Coolgardie ===
1901 Western Australian state election: Coolgardie
Party	Candidate	Votes	%	±%
Ministerialist	Alfred Morgans	811	50.8	–20.0
Labour	Peter Wedd	414	25.9	+25.9
Opposition	James MacCallum Smith	372	23.3	+23.3
Total formal votes		1,597	99.2	+1.4
Informal votes		13	0.8	–1.4
Turnout		1,610	43.2	+1.9
Ministerialist hold		Swing	–20.0	

=== Cue ===
1901 Western Australian state election: Cue
Party	Candidate	Votes	%	±%
Opposition	Frederick Illingworth	407	56.3	+56.3
Opposition	William Patrick	316	43.7	+43.7
Total formal votes		723	99.2	n/a
Informal votes		6	0.8	n/a
Turnout		729	43.4	n/a
Opposition win		(new seat)		

=== Dundas ===
1901 Western Australian state election: Dundas
Party	Candidate	Votes	%	±%
Independent	Albert Thomas	348	42.3	+42.3
Independent	Robert Stewart	209	25.4	+25.4
Labour	Thomas Beattie	194	23.5	+23.5
Opposition	Cyrus McFarlane	73	8.9	+8.9
Total formal votes		824	95.8	+1.4
Informal votes		36	4.2	–1.4
Turnout		860	54.9	–19.1
Independent hold		Swing	N/A	

=== East Fremantle ===
1901 Western Australian state election: East Fremantle
Party	Candidate	Votes	%	±%
Opposition	Joseph Holmes	1,054	73.0	+22.2
Labour	William Angwin	389	27.0	+27.0
Total formal votes		1,443	99.0	+0.6
Informal votes		15	1.0	–0.6
Turnout		1,458	48.3	–19.7
Opposition hold		Swing	+22.2	

=== East Kimberley ===
1901 Western Australian state election: East Kimberley
Party	Candidate	Votes	%	±%
Ministerialist	Francis Connor	33	50.8	–49.2
Opposition	William Stretch	32	49.2	+49.2
Total formal votes		65	98.5	n/a
Informal votes		1	1.5	n/a
Turnout		66	61.1	n/a
Ministerialist hold		Swing	–49.2	

- Connor had held the seat unopposed in 1897.

=== East Perth ===
1901 Western Australian state election: East Perth
Party	Candidate	Votes	%	±%
Opposition	Walter James	614	62.7	–8.4
Opposition	Arthur Short	366	37.3	+37.3
Total formal votes		980	99.1	+1.9
Informal votes		9	0.9	–1.9
Turnout		989	39.6	+2.1
Opposition hold		Swing	–8.4	

=== Fremantle ===
1901 Western Australian state election: Fremantle
Party	Candidate	Votes	%	±%
Ministerialist	John Higham	194	65.1	–34.9
Opposition	George Bricknell	104	34.9	+34.9
Total formal votes		298	98.3	n/a
Informal votes		5	1.7	n/a
Turnout		303	22.6	n/a
Ministerialist hold		Swing	–34.9	

- Higham had held the seat unopposed in 1897.

=== Gascoyne ===
1901 Western Australian state election: Gascoyne
Party	Candidate	Votes	%	±%
Opposition	William Butcher	126	66.0	+66.0
Ministerialist	David Forrest	65	34.0	–66.0
Total formal votes		191	99.5	n/a
Informal votes		1	0.5	n/a
Turnout		192	47.6	n/a
Opposition gain from Ministerialist		Swing	+66.0	

- George Hubble, the sitting Ministerialist member, had held the seat unopposed in 1897.

=== Geraldton ===
1901 Western Australian state election: Geraldton
Party	Candidate	Votes	%	±%
Opposition	Robert Hutchinson	unopposed		
Opposition hold		Swing		

=== Greenough ===
1901 Western Australian state election: Greenough
Party	Candidate	Votes	%	±%
Ministerialist	Patrick Stone	113	35.5	+35.5
Ministerialist	John Morrell	102	32.1	+32.1
Ministerialist	Joseph Dreyer	80	25.2	+25.2
Opposition	Charles Cheeseborough	23	7.2	+7.2
Total formal votes		318	98.1	+0.2
Informal votes		6	1.9	–0.2
Turnout		324	67.2	–11.1
Ministerialist hold		Swing	N/A	

=== Guildford ===
1901 Western Australian state election: Guildford
Party	Candidate	Votes	%	±%
Ministerialist	Hector Rason	241	29.9	+29.9
Independent	Arthur Gull	339	28.4	+28.4
Opposition	Henry Downing	180	22.3	+22.3
Ministerialist	Alexander Watt	157	19.4	+19.4
Total formal votes		807	99.1	n/a
Informal votes		7	0.9	n/a
Turnout		814	57.6	n/a
Ministerialist win		(new seat)		

=== Hannans ===
1901 Western Australian state election: Hannans
Party	Candidate	Votes	%	±%
Labour	John Reside	1,870	68.3	+68.3
Opposition	James Wilkinson	857	31.3	+31.3
Independent	Morgan Field	9	0.3	+0.3
Total formal votes		2,736	96.2	n/a
Informal votes		109	3.8	n/a
Turnout		2,845	40.5	n/a
Labour win		(new seat)		

=== Irwin ===
1901 Western Australian state election: Irwin
Party	Candidate	Votes	%	±%
Ministerialist	Samuel Phillips	unopposed		
Ministerialist hold		Swing		

=== Kalgoorlie ===
1901 Western Australian state election: Kalgoorlie
Party	Candidate	Votes	%	±%
Labour	William Johnson	606	31.7	+31.7
Ministerialist	Charles Moran	506	26.5	+26.5
Opposition	William Burton	495	25.9	+25.9
Opposition	Alfred Shaw	301	15.7	+15.7
Independent	John Stuart	4	0.2	+0.2
Total formal votes		1,912	92.5	n/a
Informal votes		156	7.5	n/a
Turnout		2,068	50.1	n/a
Labour win		(new seat)		

=== Kanowna ===
1901 Western Australian state election: Kanowna
Party	Candidate	Votes	%	±%
Labour	Robert Hastie	912	60.0	+60.0
Opposition	Charles Mann	155	10.2	+10.2
Opposition	John Auldjo	143	9.4	+9.4
Opposition	Alfred McKenzie	139	9.1	+9.1
Opposition	William McMeikan	118	7.8	+7.8
Opposition	Frederick Hancey	53	3.5	+3.5
Total formal votes		1,520	94.1	n/a
Informal votes		95	5.9	n/a
Turnout		1,615	27.8	n/a
Labour win		(new seat)		

=== Menzies ===
1901 Western Australian state election: Menzies
Party	Candidate	Votes	%	±%
Opposition	Henry Gregory	unopposed		
Opposition win		(new seat)		

=== Moore ===
1901 Western Australian state election: Moore
Party	Candidate	Votes	%	±%
Ministerialist	Michael O'Connor	266	62.9	+62.9
Opposition	William Loton	157	37.1	+37.1
Total formal votes		423	98.8	+1.4
Informal votes		5	1.2	–1.4
Turnout		428	64.4	–17.1
Ministerialist hold		Swing	N/A	

=== Mount Burges ===
1901 Western Australian state election: Mount Burges
Party	Candidate	Votes	%	±%
Labour	Fergie Reid	586	69.0	+69.0
Opposition	Charles McDowall	261	30.7	+30.7
Independent	J. Thompson	2	0.2	+0.2
Total formal votes		849	98.4	n/a
Informal votes		14	1.6	n/a
Turnout		863	33.6	n/a
Labour win		(new seat)		

- J. (Joseph?) Thompson withdrew from the race after the close of nominations, and his name consequently remained on the ballot paper.

=== Mount Magnet ===
1901 Western Australian state election: Mount Magnet
Party	Candidate	Votes	%	±%
Opposition	Frank Wallace	265	41.1	+41.1
Labour	John Holman	211	32.8	+32.8
Ministerialist	Alec Clydesdale	168	26.1	+26.1
Total formal votes		644	99.7	n/a
Informal votes		2	0.3	n/a
Turnout		646	48.2	n/a
Opposition win		(new seat)		

=== Mount Margaret ===
1901 Western Australian state election: Mount Margaret
Party	Candidate	Votes	%	±%
Labour	George Taylor	771	52.1	+52.1
Opposition	George Hall	709	47.9	+47.9
Total formal votes		1,480	99.1	n/a
Informal votes		14	0.9	n/a
Turnout		1,494	54.9	n/a
Labour win		(new seat)		

=== Murchison ===
1901 Western Australian state election: Murchison
Party	Candidate	Votes	%	±%
Opposition	John Nanson	153	50.2	+50.2
Ministerialist	Samuel Mitchell	152	49.8	–50.2
Total formal votes		305	98.4	n/a
Informal votes		5	1.6	n/a
Turnout		310	68.1	n/a
Opposition gain from Ministerialist		Swing	+50.2	

- Mitchell had held the seat unopposed in 1897.

=== Murray ===
1901 Western Australian state election: Murray
Party	Candidate	Votes	%	±%
Opposition	William George	491	61.4	+3.8
Labour	Albert Wilson	309	38.6	+38.6
Total formal votes		800	99.4	+0.9
Informal votes		5	0.6	–0.9
Turnout		805	49.0	–18.1
Opposition hold		Swing	N/A	

=== Nelson ===
1901 Western Australian state election: Nelson
Party	Candidate	Votes	%	±%
Ministerialist	Sir James Lee-Steere	unopposed		
Ministerialist hold		Swing		

=== Northam ===
1901 Western Australian state election: Northam
Party	Candidate	Votes	%	±%
Ministerialist	George Throssell	unopposed		
Ministerialist hold		Swing		

=== North Fremantle ===
1901 Western Australian state election: North Fremantle
Party	Candidate	Votes	%	±%
Ministerialist	Denis Doherty	433	39.0	–12.4
Ministerialist	Thomas Cartwright	345	31.1	+31.1
Independent	Henry Passmore	332	29.9	+29.9
Total formal votes		1,110	99.1	+6.6
Informal votes		10	0.9	–6.6
Turnout		1,120	55.8	+22.2
Ministerialist hold		Swing	N/A	

=== North Murchison ===
1901 Western Australian state election: North Murchison
Party	Candidate	Votes	%	±%
Opposition	Frederick Moorhead	233	77.2	–22.8
Labour	George Carlton	69	22.8	+22.8
Total formal votes		302	98.1	n/a
Informal votes		6	1.9	n/a
Turnout		308	39.1	n/a
Opposition hold		Swing	N/A	

- Moorhead had been elected unopposed at the previous election (a ministerial by-election in 1899).

=== North Perth ===
1901 Western Australian state election: North Perth
Party	Candidate	Votes	%	±%
Independent	Richard Speight	1,125	62.9	+62.9
Opposition	Edgar Zollner	360	20.1	+20.1
Labour	Joseph Diver	303	16.9	+16.9
Total formal votes		1,788	99.4	+6.7
Informal votes		11	0.6	–6.7
Turnout		1,799	37.4	+24.6
Independent gain from Opposition		Swing	+62.9	

=== Perth ===
1901 Western Australian state election: Perth
Party	Candidate	Votes	%	±%
Opposition	Frank Wilson	691	65.4	+65.4
Ministerialist	Thomas Molloy	366	34.6	+34.6
Total formal votes		1,057	99.2	+0.9
Informal votes		9	0.8	–0.9
Turnout		1,066	38.8	–6.9
Opposition gain from Ministerialist		Swing	+62.9	

=== Pilbara ===
1901 Western Australian state election: Pilbara
Party	Candidate	Votes	%	±%
Opposition	Walter Kingsmill	unopposed		
Opposition hold		Swing		

=== Plantagenet ===
1901 Western Australian state election: Plantagenet
Party	Candidate	Votes	%	±%
Opposition	Albert Hassell	346	53.9	–46.1
Labour	Alfred Mather	296	46.1	+46.1
Total formal votes		642	98.1	n/a
Informal votes		6	1.9	n/a
Turnout		308	39.1	n/a
Opposition hold		Swing	N/A	

=== Roebourne ===
1901 Western Australian state election: Roebourne
Party	Candidate	Votes	%	±%
Independent	John Sydney Hicks	unopposed		
Independent hold		Swing		

=== South Fremantle ===
1901 Western Australian state election: South Fremantle
Party	Candidate	Votes	%	±%
Independent	Arthur Diamond	492	36.9	+36.9
Labour	William Guilfoyle	396	29.7	+29.7
Independent	William Forsythe	296	22.2	+22.2
Opposition	Walter Mortess	151	11.3	+11.3
Total formal votes		1,335	98.7	n/a
Informal votes		17	1.3	n/a
Turnout		1,352	40.9	n/a
Independent hold		Swing	N/A	

=== South Perth ===
1901 Western Australian state election: South Perth
Party	Candidate	Votes	%	±%
Ministerialist	William Gordon	258	28.4	+28.4
Opposition	Alfred Russell	226	24.9	+24.9
Independent	James Clydesdale	210	23.2	+23.2
Independent	Thomas Tate	164	18.1	+18.1
Opposition	Thomas Shafto	49	5.4	+5.4
Total formal votes		907	97.3	n/a
Informal votes		25	2.7	n/a
Turnout		932	42.4	n/a
Ministerialist win		(new seat)		

=== South West Mining ===
1901 Western Australian state election: South West Mining
Party	Candidate	Votes	%	±%
Opposition	John Ewing	394	53.2	+53.2
Labour	George Henderson	205	27.7	+27.7
Opposition	Harry Courtney	142	19.2	+19.2
Total formal votes		741	99.3	n/a
Informal votes		5	0.7	n/a
Turnout		746	60.7	n/a
Opposition win		(new seat)		

=== Subiaco ===
1901 Western Australian state election: Subiaco
Party	Candidate	Votes	%	±%
Labour	Henry Daglish	828	49.6	+49.6
Independent	Samuel Brown	535	32.1	+32.1
Independent	John Brickhill	180	10.8	+10.8
Independent	Richard Sparrow	126	7.5	+7.5
Total formal votes		1,669	97.4	n/a
Informal votes		44	2.6	n/a
Turnout		1,713	56.5	n/a
Labour win		(new seat)		

=== Sussex ===
1901 Western Australian state election: Sussex
Party	Candidate	Votes	%	±%
Ministerialist	Henry Yelverton	249	43.6	+43.6
Ministerialist	Ernest Locke	200	35.0	–8.1
Opposition	Henry Mills	122	21.4	+21.4
Total formal votes		571	99.5	+3.2
Informal votes		3	0.5	–3.2
Turnout		574	63.4	–18.0
Ministerialist hold		Swing	N/A	

=== Swan ===
1901 Western Australian state election: Swan
Party	Candidate	Votes	%	±%
Opposition	Mathieson Jacoby	249	44.7	+44.7
Ministerialist	Robert Wolfe	128	23.0	+23.0
Labour	George Hogarth	115	20.6	+20.6
Independent	William Thomas	44	7.9	+7.9
Ministerialist	Hugh McKernan	21	3.8	+3.8
Total formal votes		557	97.4	±0.0
Informal votes		15	2.6	±0.0
Turnout		572	45.0	–6.5
Opposition gain from Independent		Swing	+44.7	

=== Toodyay ===
1901 Western Australian state election: Toodyay
Party	Candidate	Votes	%	±%
Ministerialist	Timothy Quinlan	351	66.1	+2.5
Independent	Vernon Hamersley	180	33.9	+33.9
Total formal votes		531	97.4	–1.0
Informal votes		14	2.6	+1.0
Turnout		545	76.0	–6.1
Ministerialist hold		Swing	N/A	

=== Wellington ===
1901 Western Australian state election: Wellington
Party	Candidate	Votes	%	±%
Independent	Henry Teesdale Smith	300	48.1	+48.1
Labour	Charles Burke	151	24.2	+24.2
Independent	John Wellard	95	15.2	+15.2
Ministerialist	William Reading	78	12.5	+12.5
Total formal votes		624	97.3	n/a
Informal votes		17	2.7	n/a
Turnout		641	57.6	n/a
Independent gain from Ministerialist		Swing	+48.1	

=== West Kimberley ===
1901 Western Australian state election: West Kimberley
Party	Candidate	Votes	%	±%
Ministerialist	Alexander Forrest	105	78.4	–21.6
Opposition	Frank Biddles	29	21.6	+21.6
Total formal votes		134	99.3	n/a
Informal votes		1	0.7	n/a
Turnout		135	53.8	n/a
Ministerialist hold		Swing	N/A	

=== West Perth ===
1901 Western Australian state election: West Perth
Party	Candidate	Votes	%	±%
Opposition	George Leake	886	51.7	+51.7
Ministerialist	Barrington Wood	828	48.3	–5.6
Total formal votes		1,714	98.7	+0.4
Informal votes		22	1.3	–0.4
Turnout		1,736	46.8	+2.3
Opposition gain from Ministerialist		Swing	+51.7	

=== Williams ===
1901 Western Australian state election: Williams
Party	Candidate	Votes	%	±%
Ministerialist	Frederick Henry Piesse	unopposed		
Ministerialist hold		Swing		

=== Yilgarn ===
1901 Western Australian state election: Yilgarn
Party	Candidate	Votes	%	±%
Opposition	William Oats	186	39.7	–11.2
Labour	Richard Sneddon	147	31.4	+31.4
Ministerialist	Isidor Cohn	74	15.8	–23.6
Independent	William Montgomery	61	13.0	+13.0
Total formal votes		468	99.4	+4.0
Informal votes		3	0.6	–4.0
Turnout		471	47.6	+0.1
Opposition hold		Swing	N/A	

=== York ===
1901 Western Australian state election: York
Party	Candidate	Votes	%	±%
Ministerialist	Frederick Monger	unopposed		
Ministerialist hold		Swing		

== See also ==
- Members of the Western Australian Legislative Assembly, 1897–1901
- Members of the Western Australian Legislative Assembly, 1901–1904
