= Results of the 1897 Western Australian colonial election =

Western Australian state election, 1897 Legislative Assembly
Enrolled voters	17,114				
Votes cast	9,016		Turnout	52.68%	
Informal votes	279		Informal	3.09%	
Summary of votes by party
Party	Primary votes	%	Swing	Seats	Change
Ministerialist	4,351	49.80%		29	+ 10
Opposition	2,390	27.35%		8	– 5
Independent	1,613	18.46%		6	+ 5
Labor	383	4.38%	+4.38%	1	+ 1
Total	8,737			44	

This is a list of electoral district results of the 1897 Western Australian election.

== Results by electoral district ==
=== Albany ===
1897 Western Australian colonial election: Albany
Party	Candidate	Votes	%	±%
Opposition	George Leake	unopposed		
Opposition hold		Swing		

=== Ashburton ===
1897 Western Australian colonial election: Ashburton
Party	Candidate	Votes	%	±%
Ministerialist	Septimus Burt	unopposed		
Ministerialist hold		Swing		

=== Beverley ===
1897 Western Australian colonial election: Beverley
Party	Candidate	Votes	%	±%
Ministerialist	Charles Harper	90	63.4	
Opposition	James Dempster	52	36.6	
Total formal votes		142	96.6	
Informal votes		5	3.4	
Turnout		147	54.7	
Ministerialist hold		Swing		

=== Bunbury ===
1897 Western Australian colonial election: Bunbury
Party	Candidate	Votes	%	±%
Ministerialist	John Forrest	unopposed		
Ministerialist hold		Swing		

=== Canning ===
1897 Western Australian colonial election: Canning
Party	Candidate	Votes	%	±%
Opposition	Frank Wilson	90	48.1	
Ministerialist	William Gibbs	41	21.9	
Ministerialist	Edward Rodoreda	29	15.5	
Ind. Ministerialist	William Stubbs	14	7.5	
Opposition	Marinus Canning	13	7.0	
Total formal votes		187	93.5	
Informal votes		13	6.5	
Turnout		200	62.3	
Opposition hold		Swing		

=== Central Murchison ===
1897 Western Australian colonial election: Central Murchison
Party	Candidate	Votes	%	±%
Opposition	Frederick Illingworth	182	59.7	
Ministerialist	Joseph Thompson	97	31.8	
Independent	Daniel McIntosh	26	8.5	
Total formal votes		305	97.8	
Informal votes		7	2.2	
Turnout		312	43.6	
Opposition hold		Swing		

=== Coolgardie ===
1897 Western Australian colonial election: Coolgardie
Party	Candidate	Votes	%	±%
Ministerialist	Alf Morgans	595	70.8	
Opposition	Alfred Hales	245	29.2	
Total formal votes		840	97.8	
Informal votes		19	2.2	
Turnout		859	41.3	
Ministerialist hold		Swing		

=== De Grey ===
1897 Western Australian colonial election: De Grey
Party	Candidate	Votes	%	±%
Ministerialist	Edward Hooley	unopposed		
Ministerialist hold		Swing		

=== Dundas ===
1897 Western Australian colonial election: Dundas
Party	Candidate	Votes	%	±%
Ind. Ministerialist	John Conolly	85	41.7	
Opposition	Edward Harney	72	35.3	
Independent	Arthur Austin	47	23.0	
Total formal votes		204	94.4	
Informal votes		12	5.6	
Turnout		216	74.0	
Ind. Ministerialist hold		Swing		

=== East Coolgardie ===
1897 Western Australian colonial election: East Coolgardie
Party	Candidate	Votes	%	±%
Ministerialist	Charles Moran	500	56.1	
Independent	James Wilkinson	309	34.7	
Labour	Robert Norman	82	9.2	
Total formal votes		891	95.1	
Informal votes		46	4.9	
Turnout		937	63.1	
Ministerialist hold		Swing		

=== East Fremantle ===
1897 Western Australian colonial election: East Fremantle
Party	Candidate	Votes	%	±%
Ministerialist	Joseph Holmes	182	50.8	
Opposition	Matthew Moss	176	49.2	
Total formal votes		358	98.3	
Informal votes		6	1.7	
Turnout		364	68.0	
Ministerialist gain from Opposition		Swing		

=== East Kimberley ===
1897 Western Australian colonial election: East Kimberley
Party	Candidate	Votes	%	±%
Ministerialist	Francis Connor	unopposed		
Ministerialist hold		Swing		

=== East Perth ===
1897 Western Australian colonial election: East Perth
Party	Candidate	Votes	%	±%
Opposition	Walter James	246	71.1	
Opposition	Archibald Sanderson	65	18.8	
Independent	Nicholas Raven	35	10.1	
Total formal votes		346	97.2	
Informal votes		10	2.8	
Turnout		356	37.5	
Opposition hold		Swing		

=== Fremantle ===
1897 Western Australian colonial election: Fremantle
Party	Candidate	Votes	%	±%
Ministerialist	John Higham	unopposed		
Ministerialist hold		Swing		

=== Gascoyne ===
1897 Western Australian colonial election: Gascoyne
Party	Candidate	Votes	%	±%
Ministerialist	George Hubble	unopposed		
Ministerialist hold		Swing		

=== Geraldton ===
1897 Western Australian colonial election: Geraldton
Party	Candidate	Votes	%	±%
Opposition	George Simpson	146	55.7	
Opposition	Joseph Thomson	59	22.5	
Ministerialist	Henry Spalding	54	20.6	
Opposition	James Simpson	3	1.2	
Total formal votes		262	97.8	
Informal votes		6	2.2	
Turnout		268	50.0	
Opposition hold		Swing		

=== Greenough ===
1897 Western Australian colonial election: Greenough
Party	Candidate	Votes	%	±%
Ind. Ministerialist	Richard Pennefather	73	52.9	
Ministerialist	William Traylen	41	29.7	
Ministerialist	Major Logue	24	17.4	
Total formal votes		138	97.9	
Informal votes		3	2.1	
Turnout		141	78.3	
Ind. Ministerialist gain from Ministerialist		Swing		

=== Irwin ===
1897 Western Australian colonial election: Irwin
Party	Candidate	Votes	%	±%
Ministerialist	Samuel J. Phillips	unopposed		
Ministerialist hold		Swing		

=== Moore ===
1897 Western Australian colonial election: Moore
Party	Candidate	Votes	%	±%
Ministerialist	Henry Lefroy	165	63.2	
Ministerialist	Jeremiah Clune	96	36.8	
Total formal votes		261	97.4	
Informal votes		7	2.6	
Turnout		268	81.5	
Ministerialist hold		Swing		

=== Murchison ===
1897 Western Australian colonial election: Murchison
Party	Candidate	Votes	%	±%
Ministerialist	Samuel Mitchell	unopposed		
Ministerialist hold		Swing		

=== Murray ===
1897 Western Australian colonial election: Murray
Party	Candidate	Votes	%	±%
Independent	William George	148	57.6	
Ministerialist	William Paterson	109	42.4	
Total formal votes		257	98.5	
Informal votes		4	1.5	
Turnout		261	67.1	
Independent hold		Swing		

=== Nelson ===
1897 Western Australian colonial election: Nelson
Party	Candidate	Votes	%	±%
Ministerialist	James George Lee-Steere	unopposed		
Ministerialist hold		Swing		

=== North Coolgardie ===
1897 Western Australian colonial election: North Coolgardie
Party	Candidate	Votes	%	±%
Independent	Henry Gregory	288	54.6	
Opposition	Hugh Mahon	228	43.3	
Independent	William Kerr	11	2.1	
Total formal votes		527	99.2	
Informal votes		4	0.8	
Turnout		531	68.8	
Independent hold		Swing		

=== North Fremantle ===
1897 Western Australian colonial election: North Fremantle
Party	Candidate	Votes	%	±%
Ministerialist	Denis Doherty	160	51.4	
Opposition	James King	84	27.0	
Independent	Robert Dearle	47	15.1	
Independent	Rowland Rees	20	6.4	
Total formal votes		311	92.6	
Informal votes		25	7.4	
Turnout		336	33.6	
Ministerialist hold		Swing		

=== North Murchison ===
1897 Western Australian colonial election: North Murchison
Party	Candidate	Votes	%	±%
Opposition	Henry Kenny	52	53.1	
Ministerialist	Frederick Moorhead	46	46.9	
Total formal votes		98	98.0	
Informal votes		2	2.0	
Turnout		100	52.9	
Opposition hold		Swing		

=== North Perth ===
1897 Western Australian colonial election: North Perth
Party	Candidate	Votes	%	±%
Labour	Charles Oldham	73	30.2	
Ministerialist	James Bennett	69	28.5	
Ministerialist	Horace Stirling	47	19.4	
Independent	Michael Cavanagh	34	14.1	
Independent	John Phair	19	7.9	
Total formal votes		242	92.7	
Informal votes		19	7.3	
Turnout		261	62.0	
Labour gain from Ministerialist		Swing		

=== North-East Coolgardie ===
1897 Western Australian colonial election: North-East Coolgardie
Party	Candidate	Votes	%	±%
Opposition	Frederick Vosper	236	43.0	
Independent	Nathaniel Harper	177	32.2	
Opposition	John Dwyer	69	12.6	
Opposition	Archibald Barclay	67	12.2	
Total formal votes		549	94.8	
Informal votes		30	5.2	
Turnout		579	50.7	
Opposition hold		Swing		

=== Northam ===
1897 Western Australian colonial election: Northam
Party	Candidate	Votes	%	±%
Ministerialist	George Throssell	unopposed		
Ministerialist hold		Swing		

=== Perth ===
1897 Western Australian colonial election: Perth
Party	Candidate	Votes	%	±%
Ministerialist	Lyall Hall	268	50.5	
Opposition	Stephen Parker	263	49.5	
Total formal votes		531	98.3	
Informal votes		9	1.7	
Turnout		540	45.7	
Ministerialist hold		Swing		

=== Pilbara ===
1897 Western Australian colonial election: Pilbara
Party	Candidate	Votes	%	±%
Independent	Walter Kingsmill	110	68.8	
Independent	Edward Edgecumbe	50	31.2	
Total formal votes		160	98.2	
Informal votes		3	1.8	
Turnout		163	62.5	
Independent hold		Swing		

=== Plantagenet ===
1897 Western Australian colonial election: Plantagenet
Party	Candidate	Votes	%	±%
Ministerialist	Albert Hassell	unopposed		
Ministerialist hold		Swing		

=== Roebourne ===
1897 Western Australian colonial election: Roebourne
Party	Candidate	Votes	%	±%
Ministerialist	Horace Sholl	unopposed		
Ministerialist hold		Swing		

=== South Fremantle ===
1897 Western Australian colonial election: South Fremantle
Party	Candidate	Votes	%	±%
Independent	Elias Solomon	unopposed		
Independent hold		Swing		

=== South Murchison ===
1897 Western Australian colonial election: South Murchison
Party	Candidate	Votes	%	±%
Ministerialist	Cornthwaite Rason	87	40.8	
Ministerialist	Frederick Trude	80	37.6	
Independent	Malcolm Reid	39	18.3	
Opposition	John Perryman	7	3.3	
Total formal votes		213	98.6	
Informal votes		3	1.4	
Turnout		216	54.1	
Ministerialist hold		Swing		

=== Sussex ===
1897 Western Australian colonial election: Sussex
Party	Candidate	Votes	%	±%
Ministerialist	Ernest Locke	100	43.1	
Ministerialist	Frank Backhouse	71	30.6	
Ministerialist	Joseph Cookworthy	61	26.3	
Total formal votes		232	96.3	
Informal votes		9	3.7	
Turnout		241	81.4	
Ministerialist hold		Swing		

=== Swan ===
1897 Western Australian colonial election: Swan
Party	Candidate	Votes	%	±%
Independent	Norman Ewing	116	38.4	
Ministerialist	William Johnson	91	30.1	
Ministerialist	James Morrison	82	27.2	
Ministerialist	James Huelin	13	4.3	
Total formal votes		302	97.4	
Informal votes		8	2.6	
Turnout		310	51.5	
Independent hold		Swing		

=== Toodyay ===
1897 Western Australian colonial election: Toodyay
Party	Candidate	Votes	%	±%
Ministerialist	Timothy Quinlan	201	63.6	
Ministerialist	Barnard Clarkson	115	36.4	
Total formal votes		316	98.4	
Informal votes		5	1.6	
Turnout		321	82.1	
Ministerialist hold		Swing		

=== Wellington ===
1897 Western Australian colonial election: Wellington
Party	Candidate	Votes	%	±%
Ministerialist	Harry Venn	unopposed		
Ministerialist hold		Swing		

=== West Kimberley ===
1897 Western Australian colonial election: West Kimberley
Party	Candidate	Votes	%	±%
Ministerialist	Alexander Forrest	unopposed		
Ministerialist hold		Swing		

=== West Perth ===
1897 Western Australian colonial election: West Perth
Party	Candidate	Votes	%	±%
Ministerialist	Barrington Wood	411	53.9	
Ministerialist	Thomas Molloy	260	34.1	
Opposition	Robert Knox-Peden	91	11.9	
Total formal votes		762	98.3	
Informal votes		13	1.7	
Turnout		775	44.5	
Ministerialist hold		Swing		

=== Williams ===
1897 Western Australian colonial election: Williams
Party	Candidate	Votes	%	±%
Ministerialist	Frederick Piesse	unopposed		
Ministerialist hold		Swing		

=== Yalgoo ===
1897 Western Australian colonial election: Yalgoo
Party	Candidate	Votes	%	±%
Independent	Frank Wallace	39	50.7	
Opposition	Henry Mills	35	45.4	
Independent	Solomon Lowns	3	3.9	
Total formal votes		77	100.0	
Informal votes		0	0.0	
Turnout		77	56.6	
Independent hold		Swing		

=== Yilgarn ===
1897 Western Australian colonial election: Yilgarn
Party	Candidate	Votes	%	±%
Independent	William Oats	115	50.9	
Ministerialist	Isidor Cohn	89	39.4	
Opposition	George Leckie	22	9.7	
Total formal votes		226	95.4	
Informal votes		11	4.6	
Turnout		237	47.5	
Independent hold		Swing		

=== York ===
1897 Western Australian colonial election: York
Party	Candidate	Votes	%	±%
Ministerialist	Frederick Monger	unopposed		
Ministerialist hold		Swing		

== See also ==
- 1897 Western Australian colonial election
- Members of the Western Australian Legislative Assembly, 1897–1901
