= Members of the Western Australian Legislative Assembly, 1901–1904 =

This is a list of members of the Western Australian Legislative Assembly between the 1901 election and the 1904 election, together known as the Fourth Parliament.

The names of parliamentary groupings, which were not formalised parties, were established prior to the 1901 election, with Ministerialists being those sympathetic to former premier John Forrest, and Oppositionists and Independents defined accordingly. With the exit of Forrest from state politics following his successful shift to the federal Division of Swan, the Ministerial group was defeated in the election and had no obvious choice of leader, but the Opposition, led by George Leake, did not have sufficient numbers to govern in its own right. The failure of the Morgans Ministry in December 1901 after less than a month in office and the unprecedented defeat of three of its Ministers in ministerial by-elections allowed an Opposition-led government with Labour support to govern until the 1904 election with a reasonable level of stability. Therefore, the "Opposition" were in government and the "Ministerial" group was in opposition for most of the period. Bolton and Mozley (1961) introduce the terminology "Forrest party" and "Leake party", but these were not used by either the press or the groupings themselves.

Name	Party	District	Years in office
William Atkins^{[10]}	Independent	Murray	1902–1904
Thomas Bath^{[11]}	Labour	Hannans	1902–1914
R. G. Burges^{[14]}	Ministerial	York	1903–1905
William Butcher	Independent	Gascoyne	1901–1911; 1915–1917
Francis Connor	Independent	East Kimberley	1893–1905
Henry Daglish	Labour	Subiaco	1901–1911
Arthur Diamond	Independent	South Fremantle	1901–1906
Denis Doherty^{[15]}	Ministerial	North Fremantle	1897–1903
John Ewing	Ministerial/Opposition^{[4]}	South West Mining	1901–1904; 1905–1908
John Ferguson^{[15]}	Opposition	North Fremantle	1903–1904
Alexander Forrest^{[2]}	Ministerial	West Kimberley	1890–1901
John Foulkes^{[7]}	Ministerial	Claremont	1902–1911
James Gardiner^{[9]}	Opposition	Albany	1901–1904; 1914–1921
William James George^{[10]}	Opposition	Murray	1895–1902; 1909–1930
William Gordon	Ministerial	South Perth	1901–1911
Henry Gregory^{[1]}^{[6]}	Opposition	Menzies	1897–1911
Charles Harper	Ministerial/Opposition^{[4]}	Beverley	1890–1905
Albert Hassell	Opposition	Plantagenet	1890–1904
Robert Hastie	Labour	Kanowna	1901–1905
Thomas Hayward	Ministerial	Bunbury	1901–1911
John Sydney Hicks	Independent	Roebourne	1901–1908
John Higham	Ministerial	Fremantle	1896–1904
John Holman^{[5]}	Labour	North Murchison	1901–1921; 1923–1925
Joseph Holmes^{[1]}	Opposition	East Fremantle	1897–1904; 1905–1906
John Marquis Hopkins^{[12]}	Opposition	Boulder	1901–1905; 1908–1910
Robert Hutchinson	Opposition	Geraldton	1900–1904
Frederick Illingworth^{[1]}^{[6]}	Opposition	Cue	1894–1904
James Isdell^{[13]}	Independent	Pilbara	1903–1906
Mathieson Jacoby	Opposition	Swan	1901–1905; 1908–1911
Walter James^{[9]}	Opposition	East Perth	1894–1904
William Johnson	Labour	Kalgoorlie	1901–1905; 1906–1917; 1924–1948
Walter Kingsmill^{[1]}^{[6]}^{[13]}	Opposition	Pilbara	1897–1903
George Leake^{[1]}^{[6]}^{[8]}	Opposition	West Perth	1890; 1894–1900; 1901–1902
James George Lee-Steere^{[16]}	Ministerial	Nelson	1890–1903
Francis McDonald	Opposition	Cockburn Sound	1901–1904
George McWilliams^{[3]}	Opposition	North Perth	1901–1904
Frederick Monger^{[14]}	Ministerial	York	1892–1903; 1905–1914
Frederick Moorhead^{[5]}	Ministerial	North Murchison	1899–1901
Charles Moran^{[8]}	Independent	West Perth	1894–1901; 1902–1905
Alf Morgans^{[5]}	Ministerial	Coolgardie	1897–1904
John Nanson^{[5]}	Ministerial	Murchison	1901–1905; 1908–1914
William Oats	Independent	Yilgarn	1897–1904
Michael O'Connor	Ministerial	Moore	1901–1904
Samuel J. Phillips	Ministerial	Irwin	1890–1904
Frederick Henry Piesse	Ministerial	Williams	1890–1909
Sydney Pigott^{[2]}	Ministerial	West Kimberley	1901–1904
William Purkiss^{[5]}	Ministerial	Perth	1901–1904
Timothy Quinlan^{[5]}	Ministerial	Toodyay	1890–1894; 1897–1911
Cornthwaite Rason^{[6]}	Ministerial/Opposition^{[4]}	Guildford	1897–1906
Fergie Reid	Labour	Mount Burges	1901–1904
John Reside^{[11]}	Labor	Hannans	1901–1902
William Sayer^{[7]}	Ministerial	Claremont	1901–1902
Henry Teesdale Smith	Ministerial	Wellington	1901–1904
Richard Speight^{[3]}	Opposition	North Perth	1901
Patrick Stone	Independent	Greenough	1901–1904; 1905–1908
George Taylor	Labour	Mount Margaret	1901–1930
Albert Thomas	Independent	Dundas	1901–1905
George Throssell	Ministerial	Northam	1890–1904
Frank Wallace^{[17]}	Ind / Opposition	Mt Magnet	1897–1904
John Walter^{[16]}	Ministerial	Nelson	1903–1904
Frank Wilson^{[5]}	Opposition	Perth	1897–1901; 1904–1917
Henry Yelverton	Ministerial	Sussex	1901–1904

== Notes ==
^{1} Following the failure of the Throssell Ministry on 27 May 1901, a new six-member Ministry comprising Opposition members led by George Leake was formed. These members were therefore required to resign and contest ministerial by-elections. On 19 June 1901, all of them were returned unopposed.
^{2} On 20 June 1901, the Ministerial member for West Kimberley, Alexander Forrest, died. At the resulting by-election on 23 July 1901, Ministerial candidate Sydney Pigott was elected to fill the vacancy.
^{3} On 19 September 1901, the Opposition member for North Perth, Richard Speight, died. At the resulting by-election on 5 October 1901, Opposition candidate George McWilliams was elected to fill the vacancy.
^{4} In mid-December 1901, Cornthwaite Rason, Charles Harper and John Ewing switched allegiance from the Morgans Ministry to the supporters of Leake. (p.2234, Hansard)
^{5} The Leake Ministry, following a want of confidence motion moved on 31 October 1901 and passed on 9 November 1901, was replaced on 21 November by a new six-member Ministry comprising mostly Ministerial members led by Alf Morgans. These members were therefore required to resign and contest ministerial by-elections. According to Brian de Garis (Stannage, p.348), Leake and his supporters set about "the best organised campaigning the state had ever witnessed" for the by-elections, and three of the ministers—Frank Wilson (Perth), Legislative Councillor Matthew Moss (West Province) and Frederick Moorhead (North Murchison) were defeated. William Purkiss won Perth whilst Labour candidate John Holman won North Murchison. Morgans, Quinlan and Nanson retained their seats.
^{6} The Morgans Ministry resigned on 20 December 1901 and a new six-member Ministry comprising Opposition members headed by George Leake was appointed three days later. These members were therefore required to resign and contest ministerial by-elections—four of them for the second time in seven months. All were returned on 7 January 1902—Illingworth and Gregory unopposed, the others winning against independent candidates.
^{7} In May 1902, the Ministerial member for Claremont, William Sayer, resigned. At the resulting by-election on 11 June 1902, Opposition candidate John Foulkes was elected.
^{8} On 24 June 1902, the premier and member for West Perth, George Leake, died unexpectedly at the age of 45. The Independent candidate and former Ministerial member for East Coolgardie, Charles Moran, won the resulting by-election on 14 July 1902.
^{9} Following the death of Premier Leake, a new Ministry led by Leake supporter Walter James was appointed on 1 July 1902. Most of the ministers under Leake continued, so only Walter James (East Perth) and James Gardiner (Albany were required to resign and contest ministerial by-elections. Both were returned unopposed on 11 July 1902.
^{10} On 1 July 1902, William James George, the member for Murray, resigned. At the resulting by-election on 16 July 1902, Independent candidate William Atkins was elected.
^{11} On 29 September 1902, the Labour member for Hannans, John Reside, died. Labour candidate Thomas Bath was returned unopposed in the resulting by-election on 15 October 1902.
^{12} On 17 February 1903, John Marquis Hopkins, the member for Boulder, was appointed as Minister for Lands. He resigned to contest the ministerial by-election, but was returned unopposed on 25 February 1903.
^{13} On 12 February 1903, the Opposition member for Pilbara, Walter Kingsmill, resigned. At the resulting by-election on 18 March 1903, Independent candidate James Isdell was elected.
^{14} On 24 March 1903, the Ministerial member for York, Frederick Monger, resigned. At the resulting by-election on 6 April 1903, Ministerial candidate R. G. Burges was elected.
^{15} In August 1903, the Ministerial member for North Fremantle, Denis Doherty, resigned from parliament and returned to England. At the resulting by-election on 26 August 1903, John Ferguson was elected, beating Labor rival James Ives by 6 votes.
^{16} On 30 November 1903, the Ministerial member for Nelson and Speaker of the Western Australian Legislative Assembly, Sir James George Lee-Steere, died. Ministerial candidate John Walter was returned unopposed in the resulting by-election on 11 December 1903.
^{17} Note - The Legislative seat of Mt Magnet was originally totally omitted from this list. The seat was occupied by Frank Wallace, previously MLA for the former seat of Yalgoo. - Some other websites in this series also have omitted Mt Magnet for the Electoral period 1901-1904, and have it commencing as an electoral district in 1904

== Sources ==
- Black, David; Prescott, Valerie (1997). Election statistics, Legislative Assembly of Western Australia, 1890-1996. Perth: Parliamentary History Project. ISBN 0-7309-8409-5.
- Hughes, Colin A.; Graham, B. D. (1976). Voting for the South Australian, Western Australian and Tasmanian Lower Houses, 1890-1964. Canberra: Australian National University. ISBN 0-7081-1334-6.
- Bolton, Geoffrey; Mozley, Ann (1961). The Western Australian Legislature, 1870-1930. Canberra: Australian National University. (no ISBN)
- de Garis, Brian (1 December 1981). "Self-government and the evolution of party politics". In C. T. Stannage (ed.). A New History of Western Australia. Nedlands: UWA Publishing. ISBN 0-85564-181-9. LCCN 82101009. OCLC 963830667. OL 3517729M. Wikidata Q125995168.
