= Results of the 1894 Western Australian colonial election =

List of 1894 Western Australia general election results

This is a list of the results of the 1894 general election in Western Australia, listed by electoral district. Information about informal votes (and thus about voter turnout) is unavailable.

== Results by electoral district ==
=== Albany ===
1894 Western Australian colonial election: Albany
Party	Candidate	Votes	%	±%
None	George Leake	187	50.1	+50.1
None	Francis Dymes	186	49.9	+49.9

=== Ashburton ===
1894 Western Australian colonial election: Ashburton
Party	Candidate	Votes	%	±%
None	Septimus Burt	unopposed		

=== Beverley ===
1894 Western Australian colonial election: Beverley
Party	Candidate	Votes	%	±%
None	Charles Harper	85	50.6	–49.4
None	James Dempster	83	49.4	+49.4

=== Bunbury ===
1894 Western Australian colonial election: Bunbury
Party	Candidate	Votes	%	±%
None	Sir John Forrest	unopposed		

=== De Grey ===
1894 Western Australian colonial election: De Grey
Party	Candidate	Votes	%	±%
None	Alexander Richardson	unopposed		

=== East Kimberley ===
1894 Western Australian colonial election: East Kimberley
Party	Candidate	Votes	%	±%
None	Francis Connor	unopposed		

=== East Perth ===
1894 Western Australian colonial election: East Perth
Party	Candidate	Votes	%	±%
National Education	Walter James	522	71.1	+71.1
Education Defence	Alfred Canning	212	28.9	–19.9

=== Fremantle ===
1894 Western Australian colonial election: Fremantle
Party	Candidate	Votes	%	±%
None	William Marmion	218	53.7	–46.3
None	Arthur Diamond	188	46.3	+46.3

=== Gascoyne ===
1894 Western Australian colonial election: Gascoyne
Party	Candidate	Votes	%	±%
None	Robert Sholl	unopposed		

=== Geraldton ===
1894 Western Australian colonial election: Geraldton
Party	Candidate	Votes	%	±%
None	George Simpson	160	53.5	+53.5
None	Patrick Stone	139	46.5	+46.5

=== Greenough ===
1894 Western Australian colonial election: Greenough
Party	Candidate	Votes	%	±%
None	William Traylen	56	50.5	–49.5
None	Major Logue	55	49.5	+49.5

=== Irwin ===
1894 Western Australian colonial election: Irwin
Party	Candidate	Votes	%	±%
None	Samuel Phillips	unopposed		

=== Moore ===
1894 Western Australian colonial election: Moore
Party	Candidate	Votes	%	±%
None	Henry Lefroy	unopposed		

=== Murchison ===
1894 Western Australian colonial election: Murchison
Party	Candidate	Votes	%	±%
None	Everard Darlot	unopposed		

=== Murray ===
1894 Western Australian colonial election: Murray
Party	Candidate	Votes	%	±%
None	William Paterson	120	67.4	–32.6
None	William George	58	32.6	+32.6

=== Nannine ===
1894 Western Australian colonial election: Nannine
Party	Candidate	Votes	%	±%
None	Frederick Illingworth	152	71.4	n/a
None	Leonard Darlot	61	28.6	n/a

=== Nelson ===
1894 Western Australian colonial election: Nelson
Party	Candidate	Votes	%	±%
None	Sir James Lee-Steere	unopposed		

=== Northam ===
1894 Western Australian colonial election: Northam
Party	Candidate	Votes	%	±%
None	George Throssell	163	73.4	–26.6
None	Henry Cooke	59	26.6	+26.6

=== North Fremantle ===
1894 Western Australian colonial election: North Fremantle
Party	Candidate	Votes	%	±%
None	William Pearse	236	45.6	–9.9
PPL	George Baker	144	27.9	+27.9
None	Matthew Moss	137	26.5	+26.5

=== Perth ===
1894 Western Australian colonial election: Perth
Party	Candidate	Votes	%	±%
National Education	George Randell	378	61.3	+61.3
Education Defence	Thomas Molloy	239	38.7	+38.7

=== Pilbara ===
1894 Western Australian colonial election: Pilbara
Party	Candidate	Votes	%	±%
None	Henry Keep	unopposed		

=== Plantagenet ===
1894 Western Australian colonial election: Plantagenet
Party	Candidate	Votes	%	±%
None	Albert Hassell	unopposed		

=== Roebourne ===
1894 Western Australian colonial election: Roebourne
Party	Candidate	Votes	%	±%
None	Horace Sholl	unopposed		

=== South Fremantle ===
1894 Western Australian colonial election: South Fremantle
Party	Candidate	Votes	%	±%
None	Elias Solomon	unopposed		

=== Sussex ===
1894 Western Australian colonial election: Sussex
Party	Candidate	Votes	%	±%
None	Joseph Cookworthy	unopposed		

=== Swan ===
1894 Western Australian colonial election: Swan
Party	Candidate	Votes	%	±%
None	William Loton	unopposed		

=== Toodyay ===
1894 Western Australian colonial election: Toodyay
Party	Candidate	Votes	%	±%
None	Barnard Clarkson	unopposed		

=== Wellington ===
1894 Western Australian colonial election: Wellington
Party	Candidate	Votes	%	±%
None	Harry Venn	unopposed		

=== West Kimberley ===
1894 Western Australian colonial election: West Kimberley
Party	Candidate	Votes	%	±%
None	Alexander Forrest	53	64.6	–35.4
None	George Streeter	29	35.4	+35.4

=== West Perth ===
1894 Western Australian colonial election: West Perth
Party	Candidate	Votes	%	±%
National Education	Barrington Wood	398	42.1	+42.1
Education Defence	Timothy Quinlan	379	40.1	–11.7
None	Richard Haynes	169	17.9	–29.3

=== Williams ===
1894 Western Australian colonial election: Williams
Party	Candidate	Votes	%	±%
None	Frederick Piesse	196	82.0	–18.0
None	Wesley Maley	43	18.0	+18.0

=== Yilgarn ===
1894 Western Australian colonial election: Yilgarn
Party	Candidate	Votes	%	±%
None	Charles Moran	168	45.3	n/a
None	Lancel de Hamel	134	36.2	n/a
None	William Cameron	69	18.6	n/a

=== York ===
1894 Western Australian colonial election: York
Party	Candidate	Votes	%	±%
None	Frederick Monger	unopposed		

== See also ==
- Members of the Western Australian Legislative Assembly, 1890–1894
- Members of the Western Australian Legislative Assembly, 1894–1897
