= Electoral results for the district of West Kimberley =

Western Australian district election results

This is a list of electoral results for the Electoral district of West Kimberley in Western Australian state elections.

== Members for West Kimberley ==
Member	Party	Term
Alexander Forrest	Ministerial	1890–1901
Sydney Pigott	Ministerial	1901–1904

== Election results ==
=== Elections in the 1900s ===
1901 Western Australian state election: West Kimberley
Party	Candidate	Votes	%	±%
Ministerialist	Alexander Forrest	105	78.4	–21.6
Opposition	Frank Biddles	29	21.6	+21.6
Total formal votes		134	99.3	n/a
Informal votes		1	0.7	n/a
Turnout		135	53.8	n/a
Ministerialist hold		Swing	N/A	

=== Elections in the 1890s ===
1897 Western Australian colonial election: West Kimberley
Party	Candidate	Votes	%	±%
Ministerialist	Alexander Forrest	unopposed		
Ministerialist hold		Swing		

1894 Western Australian colonial election: West Kimberley
Party	Candidate	Votes	%	±%
None	Alexander Forrest	53	64.6	–35.4
None	George Streeter	29	35.4	+35.4

1890 Western Australian colonial election: West Kimberley
Party	Candidate	Votes	%	±%
None	Alexander Forrest	unopposed		
