= Members of the Western Australian Legislative Assembly, 1897–1901 =

The following is a list of members of the Western Australian Legislative Assembly between the 1897 elections and the 1901 elections, together known as the Third Parliament.

Name	Party	District	Years in office
Septimus Burt^{[6]}	Ministerial	Ashburton	1890–1900
Francis Connor	Ministerial	East Kimberley	1893–1905
John Conolly	Ind. Min.	Dundas	1897–1901
Leonard Darlot^{[7]}	Ministerial	De Grey	1900–1901
Denis Doherty	Ministerial	North Fremantle	1897–1903
Norman Ewing	Independent	Swan	1897–1901
Alexander Forrest	Ministerial	West Kimberley	1890–1901
David Forrest^{[6]}	Ministerial	Ashburton	1900–1901
Hon Sir John Forrest	Ministerial	Bunbury	1890–1901
William James George	Independent	Murray	1895–1902; 1909–1930
Henry Gregory	Independent	North Coolgardie	1897–1911
Lyall Hall	Ministerial	Perth	1897–1901
Charles Harper	Independent	Beverley	1890–1905
Albert Hassell	Ministerial	Plantagenet	1890–1904
John Hassell^{[8]}	Opposition	Albany	1900–1901
John Higham	Ministerial	Fremantle	1896–1904
Joseph Holmes	Ministerial	East Fremantle	1897–1904; 1905–1906
Edward Hooley^{[7]}	Ministerial	De Grey	1894–1900
George Hubble^{[2]}	Ministerial	Gascoyne	1897–1901
Robert Hutchinson^{[4]}	Opposition	Geraldton	1900–1904
Frederick Illingworth	Opposition	Central Murchison	1894–1904
Walter James	Opposition	East Perth	1894–1904
Henry Kenny^{[5]}	Independent	North Murchison	1897–1899
Walter Kingsmill	Independent	Pilbara	1897–1903
George Leake^{[8]}	Opposition	Albany	1890; 1894–1900; 1901–1902
James George Lee-Steere	Ministerial	Nelson	1890–1903
Henry Lefroy^{[1]}	Ministerial	Moore	1892–1901; 1911–1921
Ernest Locke	Ministerial	Sussex	1897–1901
Samuel Mitchell	Ministerial	Murchison	1897–1901
Frederick Monger^{[3]}	Ministerial	York	1892–1903; 1905–1914
Charles Moran	Ministerial	East Coolgardie	1894–1901; 1902–1905
Frederick Moorhead^{[5]}	Ministerial	North Murchison	1899–1901
Alf Morgans	Ministerial	Coolgardie	1897–1904
William Oats	Independent	Yilgarn	1897–1904
Charles Oldham^{[10]}	Labour	North Perth	1897–1900
Richard Pennefather^{[1]}	Ind. Min.	Greenough	1897–1901
Samuel J. Phillips	Ministerial	Irwin	1890–1904
Frederick Henry Piesse	Ministerial	Williams	1890–1909
Timothy Quinlan	Ministerial	Toodyay	1890–1894; 1897–1911
Cornthwaite Rason	Ministerial	South Murchison	1897–1906
Richard Robson^{[4]}	Independent	Geraldton	1899–1900
Horace Sholl	Ministerial	Roebourne	1891–1901
George Simpson^{[4]}	Opposition	Geraldton	1891–1899
Elias Solomon	Independent	South Fremantle	1892–1901
George Throssell	Ministerial	Northam	1890–1904
Harry Venn	Ministerial	Wellington	1890–1901
Frederick Vosper^{[11]}	Opposition	North-East Coolgardie	1897–1901
Frank Wallace	Independent	Yalgoo	1897–1904
Frank Wilson	Opposition	Canning	1897–1901; 1904–1917
Barrington Wood^{[9]}	Ministerial	West Perth	1894–1901

== Notes ==
^{1} On 12 May 1897, Henry Lefroy, the member for Moore, was appointed Minister for Education by Premier John Forrest, and on 27 October 1897, Richard Pennefather, the member for Greenough, was appointed Attorney-General. Both were therefore required to resign and contest ministerial by-elections, at which both were returned unopposed.
^{2} On 13 June 1899, George Hubble, the member for Gascoyne, resigned. He was returned unopposed in the resulting by-election on 26 June 1899.
^{3} On 15 June 1899, Frederick Monger, the member for York, resigned. He was returned unopposed in the resulting by-election on 26 June 1899.
^{4} On 27 June 1899, George Simpson, the Opposition member for Geraldton, resigned. At the resulting by-election held on 12 July 1899, he was defeated by Independent candidate Richard Robson. On 13 June 1900, Robson resigned, and at the by-election held to replace him on 24 July 1900, Opposition candidate Robert Hutchinson was successful. He went on to win the seat unopposed at the 1901 election nine months later.
^{5} Henry Kenny, the Opposition member for North Murchison, died on 25 August 1899. Ministerial candidate Frederick Moorhead won the resulting by-election on 18 September 1899.
^{6} Septimus Burt, the member for Ashburton, resigned in April 1900. At the resulting by-election, David Forrest, the younger brother of Premier John Forrest and Alexander Forrest, was returned unopposed on 24 April 1900. The year from the by-election until the April 1901 general election marked the only time in the history of Western Australia when three members of the same family had held seats in the Parliament concurrently. By July 1901, all were gone—John was elected to the new Federal Parliament representing the seat of Swan, Alexander died, and David was defeated in his bid for Electoral district of Gascoyne.
^{7} E. T. Hooley, the member for De Grey, resigned on 1 May 1900. Leonard Darlot was returned unopposed in the resulting by-election on 28 May 1900.
^{8} On 10 July 1900, George Leake, the Opposition member for Albany, resigned. At the by-election held to replace him on 24 July 1900, Opposition candidate John Hassell was successful.
^{9} On 10 September 1900, Barrington Wood, the member for West Perth, was appointed Commissioner of Railways and Minister for Works by Premier John Forrest. He were therefore required to resign and contest a ministerial by-election, at which he was returned unopposed on 22 September 1900.
^{10} The seat of North Perth was declared vacant on 16 October 1900 as the Labour member, Charles Oldham, had been absent without leave of the House for two months. No by-election was held due to the imminent 1901 election.
^{11} Frederick Vosper, the Opposition member for North-East Coolgardie, died on 6 January 1901, but no by-election was held due to the imminent 1901 election.

== Sources ==
- Black, David; Prescott, Valerie (1997). Election statistics, Legislative Assembly of Western Australia, 1890-1996. Perth: Parliamentary History Project. ISBN 0-7309-8409-5.
- Hughes, Colin A.; Graham, B. D. (1976). Voting for the South Australian, Western Australian and Tasmanian Lower Houses, 1890-1964. Canberra: Australian National University. ISBN 0-7081-1334-6.
