= Members of the Western Australian Legislative Assembly, 1894–1897 =

This is a list of members of the Western Australian Legislative Assembly between the 1894 elections and the 1897 elections, together known as the Second Parliament.

| Name | District | Years in office |
|---|---|---|
| Septimus Burt | Ashburton | 1890–1900 |
| Barnard Clarkson | Toodyay | 1890–1897 |
| Francis Connor | East Kimberley | 1893–1905 |
| Joseph Cookworthy | Sussex | 1890–1897 |
| Everard Darlot ^{[2]} | Murchison | 1890–1894 |
| Alexander Forrest | West Kimberley | 1890–1900 |
| Hon Sir John Forrest | Bunbury | 1890–1901 |
| William James George ^{[3]} | Murray | 1895–1902; 1909–1930 |
| Albert Hassell | Plantagenet | 1890–1904 |
| Charles Harper | Beverley | 1890–1905 |
| John Higham ^{[5]} | Fremantle | 1896–1904 |
| Edward Hooley ^{[2]} | Murchison | 1894–1900 |
| Frederick Illingworth | Nannine | 1894–1904; 1905–1907 |
| Walter James | East Perth | 1894–1904 |
| Henry Keep | Pilbara | 1894–1897 |
| George Leake | Albany | 1890; 1894–1900; 1901–1902 |
| James George Lee-Steere | Nelson | 1890–1903 |
| Henry Lefroy | Moore | 1892–1901; 1911–1921 |
| William Loton | Swan | 1890–1897 |
| William Marmion ^{[5]} | Fremantle | 1890–1896 |
| Frederick Monger | York | 1892–1903; 1905–1914 |
| Charles Moran | Yilgarn | 1894–1901; 1902–1905 |
| Matthew Moss ^{[4]} | North Fremantle | 1895–1897 |
| William Paterson ^{3} | Murray | 1890–1895 |
| William Silas Pearse ^{[4]} | North Fremantle | 1890–1895 |
| Samuel J. Phillips | Irwin | 1890–1904 |
| Frederick Henry Piesse ^{[1]} | Williams | 1890–1909 |
| George Randell | Perth | 1890–1892; 1894–1897 |
| Alexander Richardson ^{[1]} | De Grey | 1890–1897 |
| Horace Sholl | Roebourne | 1891–1901 |
| Robert Frederick Sholl | Gascoyne | 1890–1897 |
| George Simpson | Geraldton | 1891–1899 |
| Elias Solomon | South Fremantle | 1892–1901 |
| George Throssell ^{[1]} | Northam | 1890–1904 |
| William Traylen | Greenough | 1890–1897 |
| Harry Venn | Wellington | 1890–1901 |
| Barrington Wood | West Perth | 1894–1901 |

== Notes ==
^{1} During the term, three Members of Parliament were appointed to the Ministry by Premier John Forrest. Each were therefore required to resign and submit to a ministerial by-election in their own seat, and all were returned unopposed. The three members were Alexander Richardson (De Grey, 17 June 1895), Frederick Henry Piesse (Williams, 18 April 1896) and George Throssell (Northam, 27 January 1897).
^{2} On 18 September 1894, Everard Darlot resigned from the seat of Murchison, and at the resulting by-election on 15 October 1894, Edward Hooley was elected unopposed to fill the vacancy.
^{3} On 4 January 1895, William Paterson resigned from the seat of Murray, and at the resulting by-election on 12 January 1895, William James George was elected to fill the vacancy.
^{4} In April 1895, William Silas Pearse resigned from the seat of North Fremantle, and at the resulting byelection on 22 May 1895, Matthew Moss was elected to fill the vacancy.
^{5} On 4 July 1896, William Marmion died, leaving the seat of Fremantle vacant. At the byelection on 18 July 1896, John Higham was elected to fill the remainder of the term.

== Sources ==
- Black, David; Prescott, Valerie (1997). Election statistics, Legislative Assembly of Western Australia, 1890-1996. Perth: Parliamentary History Project. ISBN 0-7309-8409-5.
- Hughes, Colin A.; Graham, B. D. (1976). Voting for the South Australian, Western Australian and Tasmanian Lower Houses, 1890-1964. Canberra: Australian National University. ISBN 0-7081-1334-6.
