= Results of the 1890 Western Australian colonial election =

Electoral districts used at the election

This is a list of the results of the 1890 general election in Western Australia, listed by electoral district. Information about informal votes (and thus about voter turnout) is unavailable.

== Results by electoral district ==
=== Albany ===
1890 Western Australian colonial election: Albany
Party	Candidate	Votes	%	±%
None	Lancel de Hamel	194	78.2	n/a
None	Francis Bird	54	21.8	n/a

=== Ashburton ===
1890 Western Australian colonial election: Ashburton
Party	Candidate	Votes	%	±%
None	Septimus Burt	unopposed		

=== Beverley ===
1890 Western Australian colonial election: Beverley
Party	Candidate	Votes	%	±%
None	Charles Harper	unopposed		

=== Bunbury ===
1890 Western Australian colonial election: Bunbury
Party	Candidate	Votes	%	±%
None	John Forrest	unopposed		

=== De Grey ===
1890 Western Australian colonial election: De Grey
Party	Candidate	Votes	%	±%
None	Alexander Richardson	unopposed		

=== East Kimberley ===
1890 Western Australian colonial election: East Kimberley
Party	Candidate	Votes	%	±%
None	William Baker	unopposed		

=== East Perth ===
1890 Western Australian colonial election: East Perth
Party	Candidate	Votes	%	±%
None	Alfred Canning	179	48.8	n/a
None	Henry Saunders	163	44.4	n/a
None	William Nicholson	25	6.8	n/a

=== Fremantle ===
1890 Western Australian colonial election: Fremantle
Party	Candidate	Votes	%	±%
None	William Marmion	unopposed		

=== Gascoyne ===
1890 Western Australian colonial election: Gascoyne
Party	Candidate	Votes	%	±%
None	Robert F. Sholl	unopposed		

=== Geraldton ===
1890 Western Australian colonial election: Geraldton
Party	Candidate	Votes	%	±%
None	Edward Vivien Harvey Keane	unopposed		

=== Greenough ===
1890 Western Australian colonial election: Greenough
Party	Candidate	Votes	%	±%
None	William Traylen	unopposed		

=== Irwin ===
1890 Western Australian colonial election: Irwin
Party	Candidate	Votes	%	±%
None	Samuel Phillips	unopposed		

=== Moore ===
1890 Western Australian colonial election: Moore
Party	Candidate	Votes	%	±%
None	George Randell	unopposed		

=== Murchison ===
1890 Western Australian colonial election: Murchison
Party	Candidate	Votes	%	±%
None	Everard Darlot	unopposed		

=== Murray ===
1890 Western Australian colonial election: Murray
Party	Candidate	Votes	%	±%
None	William Paterson	unopposed		

=== Nelson ===
1890 Western Australian colonial election: Nelson
Party	Candidate	Votes	%	±%
None	Sir James Lee-Steere	unopposed		

=== Northam ===
1890 Western Australian colonial election: Northam
Party	Candidate	Votes	%	±%
None	George Throssell	unopposed		

=== North Fremantle ===
1890 Western Australian colonial election: North Fremantle
Party	Candidate	Votes	%	±%
None	William Pearse	151	55.5	n/a
None	Adam Jameson	121	44.5	n/a

=== Perth ===
1890 Western Australian colonial election: Perth
Party	Candidate	Votes	%	±%
None	Edward Scott	234	61.6	n/a
None	Edward Courthope	146	38.4	n/a

=== Plantagenet ===
1890 Western Australian colonial election: Plantagenet
Party	Candidate	Votes	%	±%
None	Albert Hassell	60	72.3	n/a
None	Andrew Dempster	23	27.7	n/a

=== Roebourne ===
1890 Western Australian colonial election: Roebourne
Party	Candidate	Votes	%	±%
None	George Leake	unopposed		

=== South Fremantle ===
1890 Western Australian colonial election: South Fremantle
Party	Candidate	Votes	%	±%
None	David Symon	203	57.8	n/a
None	Daniel Congdon	148	42.2	n/a

=== Sussex ===
1890 Western Australian colonial election: Sussex
Party	Candidate	Votes	%	±%
None	Joseph Cookworthy	83	45.9	n/a
None	Maurice Davies	52	28.7	n/a
None	George Cross	46	25.4	n/a

=== Swan ===
1890 Western Australian colonial election: Swan
Party	Candidate	Votes	%	±%
None	William Loton	83	55.3	n/a
None	Samuel Hamersley	67	44.7	n/a

=== Toodyay ===
1890 Western Australian colonial election: Toodyay
Party	Candidate	Votes	%	±%
None	Barnard Clarkson	83	52.5	n/a
None	Charles Dempster	75	47.5	n/a

=== Wellington ===
1890 Western Australian colonial election: Wellington
Party	Candidate	Votes	%	±%
None	Harry Venn	unopposed		

=== West Kimberley ===
1890 Western Australian colonial election: West Kimberley
Party	Candidate	Votes	%	±%
None	Alexander Forrest	unopposed		

=== West Perth ===
1890 Western Australian colonial election: West Perth
Party	Candidate	Votes	%	±%
None	Timothy Quinlan	249	52.8	n/a
None	Richard Haynes	223	47.2	n/a

=== Williams ===
1890 Western Australian colonial election: Williams
Party	Candidate	Votes	%	±%
None	Frederick Piesse	unopposed		

=== York ===
1890 Western Australian colonial election: York
Party	Candidate	Votes	%	±%
None	Stephen Parker	196	75.4	n/a
None	Joseph Pyke	64	24.6	n/a

== See also ==
- Members of the Western Australian Legislative Assembly, 1890–1894
