= Electoral results for the district of North Murchison =

Western Australian district election results

This is a list of electoral results for the Electoral district of North Murchison in Western Australian state elections.

== Members for North Murchison ==
| Member | Party | Term |
|---|---|---|
| Henry Kenny | Opposition | 1897–1899 |
| Frederick Moorhead | Ministerial | 1899–1901 |
| John Holman | Labour | 1901–1904 |

== Election results ==
=== Elections in the 1900s ===
1901 North Murchison Ministerial by-election
| Party | Candidate | Votes | % | ±% |
|---|---|---|---|---|
| Labour | John Holman | 188 | 55.6 | +32.8 |
| Ministerialist | Frederick Moorhead | 150 | 44.4 | −32.8 |
| Total formal votes | | 338 | 98.3 | +0.2 |
| Informal votes | | 6 | 1.7 | −0.2 |
| Turnout | | 344 | 40.8 | +1.7 |
| Labour gain from Ministerialist | | Swing | +32.8 | |

1901 Western Australian state election: North Murchison
| Party | Candidate | Votes | % | ±% |
|---|---|---|---|---|
| Opposition | Frederick Moorhead | 233 | 77.2 | –22.8 |
| Labour | George Carlton | 69 | 22.8 | +22.8 |
| Total formal votes | | 302 | 98.1 | n/a |
| Informal votes | | 6 | 1.9 | n/a |
| Turnout | | 308 | 39.1 | n/a |
| Opposition hold | | Swing | N/A | |

- Moorhead had been elected unopposed at the previous election (a ministerial by-election in 1899).

=== Elections in the 1890s ===
1899 North Murchison colonial by-election
| Party | Candidate | Votes | % | ±% |
|---|---|---|---|---|
| Ministerialist | Frederick Moorhead | 118 | 56.2 | +9.3 |
| Opposition | Joseph Thomson | 92 | 43.8 | −9.3 |
| Total formal votes | | 210 | 98.6 | +0.6 |
| Informal votes | | 3 | 1.4 | −0.6 |
| Turnout | | 213 | 69.4 | +16.5 |
| Ministerialist gain from Opposition | | Swing | +9.3 | |

1897 Western Australian colonial election: North Murchison
| Party | Candidate | Votes | % | ±% |
|---|---|---|---|---|
| Opposition | Henry Kenny | 52 | 53.1 | |
| Ministerialist | Frederick Moorhead | 46 | 46.9 | |
| Total formal votes | | 98 | 98.0 | |
| Informal votes | | 2 | 2.0 | |
| Turnout | | 100 | 52.9 | |
| Opposition hold | | Swing | | |
