= Electoral results for the district of Cockburn Sound =

Western Australian district election results

This is a list of electoral results for the Electoral district of Cockburn Sound in Western Australian state elections.

== Members for Cockburn Sound ==
Member	Party	Term
Francis McDonald	Opposition	1901–1904

== Election results ==
=== Elections in the 1900s ===
1901 Western Australian state election: Cockburn Sound
Party	Candidate	Votes	%	±%
Opposition	Francis McDonald	290	44.3	+44.3
Opposition	Henry Barker	174	26.6	+26.6
Labour	Alexander McDougall	127	19.4	+19.4
Independent	Richard Birch	58	8.9	+8.9
Independent	James Simpson	6	0.9	+0.9
Total formal votes		655	97.9	n/a
Informal votes		14	2.1	n/a
Turnout		669	49.2	n/a
Opposition win		(new seat)		
