= Electoral results for the district of North Coolgardie =

Western Australian district election results

This is a list of electoral results for the Electoral district of Welshpool in Western Australian colonial elections.

== Members for North Coolgardie ==
Member	Party	Term
Henry Gregory	Independent	1897–1901

== Election results ==
=== Elections in the 1890s ===
1897 Western Australian colonial election: North Coolgardie
Party	Candidate	Votes	%	±%
Independent	Henry Gregory	288	54.6	
Opposition	Hugh Mahon	228	43.3	
Independent	William Kerr	11	2.1	
Total formal votes		527	99.2	
Informal votes		4	0.8	
Turnout		531	68.8	
Independent hold		Swing		
