= Henry Kenny (disambiguation) =

Henry Kenny was an Irish politician.

Henry Kenny may also refer to:

- Henry Edward Kenny (1888–1979), British soldier, Victoria Cross recipient
- Henry Kenny (Australian politician) (1853–1899), Australian member of parliament

== See also ==
- Harry Kenny, Irish footballer
