= 1894 Western Australian colonial election =

Elections of Western Australia of 1894

- June 1894

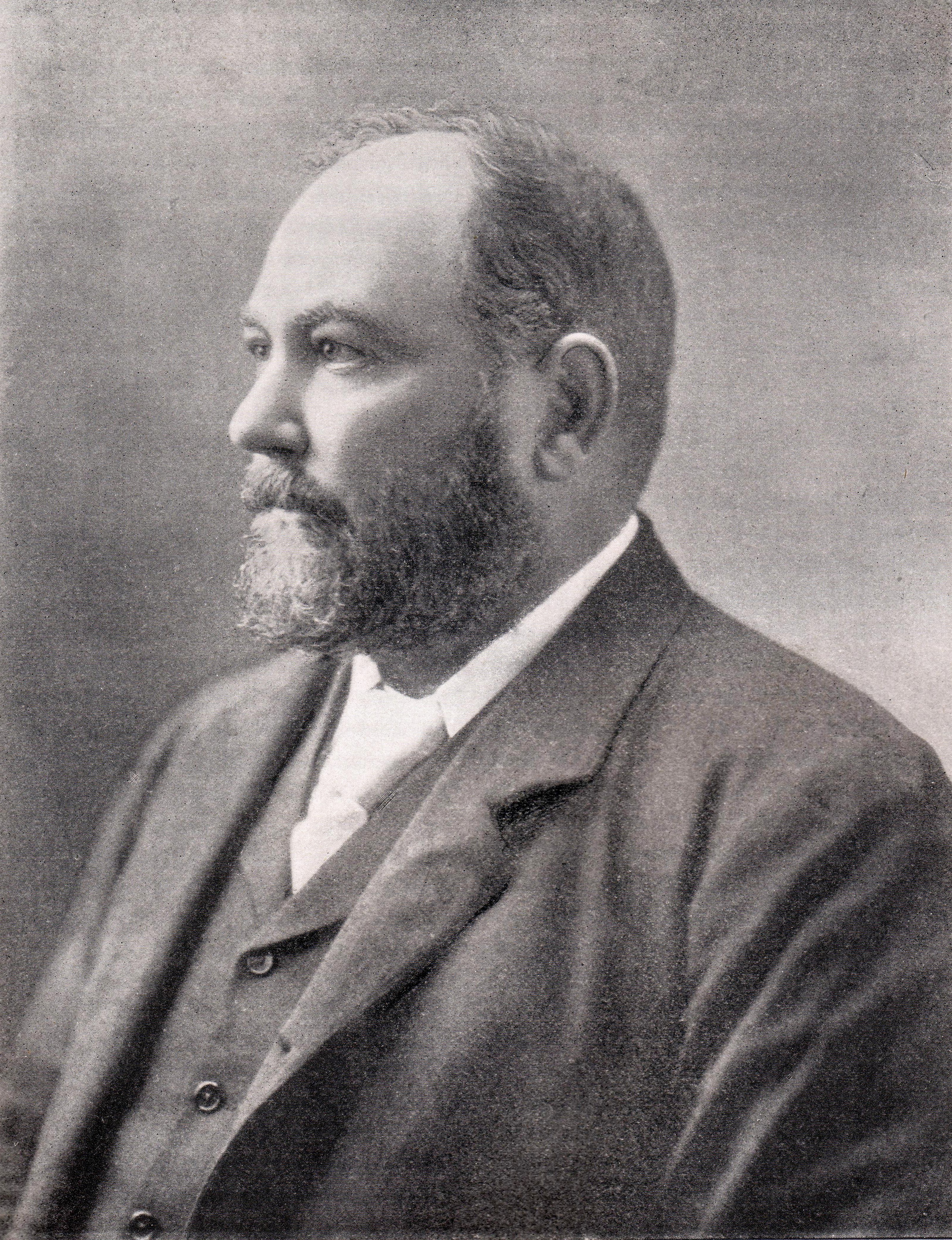
John Forrest

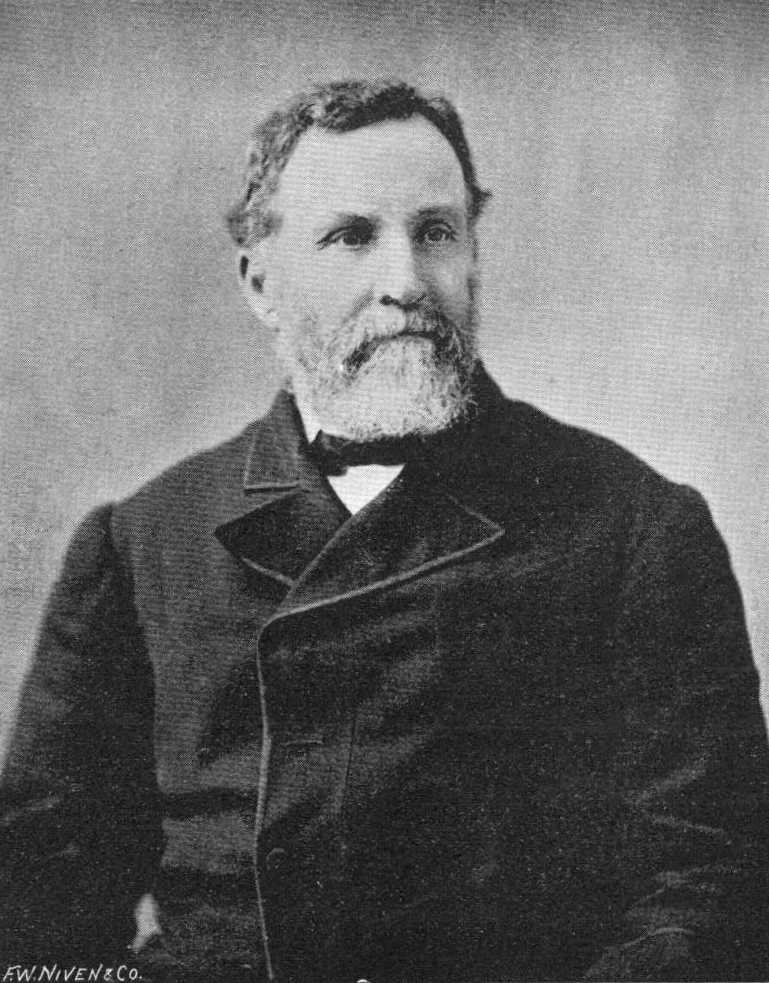
George Randell

Elections were held in the Colony of Western Australia in June and July 1894 to elect 33 members to the Legislative Assembly. Less than half of the seats were contested and virtually all campaigns were fought on local issues, although a few candidates were endorsed by extraparliamentary organisations. The election presented no threat to the government of Sir John Forrest, but its aftermath saw the establishment of a credible opposition for the first time, led by George Randell.

== Timeline ==
Close of nominations

- 12 June: East Perth, Perth, West Perth
- 13 June: Fremantle, Moore, North Fremantle, South Fremantle
- 14 June: Bunbury, Geraldton, Roebourne, Williams
- 15 June: Murray, Nelson, Plantagenet, Sussex, Swan, Wellington
- 16 June: Greenough, Toodyay
- 18 June: Albany, Irwin, Northam
- 19 June: Ashburton, Gascoyne
- 21 June: York
- 22 June: East Kimberley, Pilbara, West Kimberley, Yilgarn
- 23 June: Beverley, De Grey
- 25 June: Murchison, Nannine

Polling day

- 14 June: East Perth, Perth, West Perth
- 15 June: Fremantle, North Fremantle, South Fremantle
- 18 June: Murray, Roebourne, Swan
- 19 June: Bunbury, Geraldton
- 20 June: Nelson, Plantagenet, Sussex, Toodyay, Wellington, Williams
- 21 June: Greenough
- 22 June: Albany, Northam
- 25 June: Irwin, Moore, York
- 27 June: Beverley
- 29 June: Ashburton, De Grey, Gascoyne
- 3 July: East Kimberley, Murchison, Nannine, Pilbara, West Kimberley, Yilgarn

== Campaign and results ==
Only 15 out of the 33 seats were contested at the election, although this represented an increase of four from the 1890 election. Five of the six seats in Perth and Fremantle were contested, the exception being South Fremantle, where Elias Solomon was returned unopposed. In Perth, the major campaign issue was education – in particular, whether Catholic schools should be funded by the state. Two extraparliamentary organisations were established on either side of the debate, with the Education Defence League (led by Thomas Molloy and Timothy Quinlan) in favour and the National Education League (led by George Randell) opposed. Both leagues endorsed candidates in the three Perth electorates, with all three pro-Catholic candidates being defeated. In North Fremantle, one of the candidates, George Baker, was endorsed by the Progressive Political League (PPL), which was the political arm of the Trades and Labour Council (and a forerunner of the Labor Party). Other PPL members had been unable to meet the property qualifications necessary to stand.

== Aftermath ==
After the election, George Randell was chosen as Leader of the Opposition, and had this status acknowledged by Forrest. Other prominent figures in the opposition were William Loton and George Leake, and there was much variation in the leadership of the opposition in the years leading up to the 1897 election.
