= Frank Biddles =

Captain Frank Biddles
- Born: 1851; Mount Barker, South Australia
- Died: 1932 (aged 80–81)

Captain Frank Biddles (1851–1932) was a pearler from Broome, Western Australia.

As captain of the Alto in 1901, he was involved in rescuing 121 people following the wrecking of the SS Karrakatta in King Sound.

At the 1901 state election in Western Australia, Biddles stood for the seat of West Kimberley, as an Oppositionist (opponent of the government of George Throssell). He was defeated by the sitting member, Alexander Forrest, who supported Throssell's government.

He retired to Fremantle in 1902 (aged 51). In 1909 he married Blanche Isobel Brodrick (youngest daughter of G. W. Brodrick, a solicitor from New Zealand). They would go on to have two sons and a daughter.

In 1912 he had the Princess Theatre built. In 1913 or '14 he moved to Ivanhoe, a large residence on the corner of Ord and High Streets, where his family lived until 1948. Biddles also served as a JP in the Fremantle police courts. He died in 1932.
