= Sydney Pigott =

Australian politician

Member of the Legislative Assembly of Western Australia
- In office 23 July 1901 – 28 May 1904
- Preceded by: Alexander Forrest
- Succeeded by: None (abolished)
- Constituency: West Kimberley

Personal details
- Born: 25 April 1867 St Kilda, Victoria, Australia
- Died: 29 April 1927 (aged 60) Hove, Sussex, England

Sydney Capel Pigott (25 April 1867 – 29 April 1927) was an Australian businessman and politician who was a member of the Legislative Assembly of Western Australia from 1901 to 1904, representing the seat of West Kimberley.

Pigott was born in Melbourne to Eliza Jane (née Fox) and Louis John Pigott. He had moved to Broome, Western Australia, by 1894, and set up as a pearler, with two ships to his name. He later also purchased a hotel and owned an aerated-water factory. Pigott entered parliament at the 1901 West Kimberley by-election, which had been caused by the death of Alexander Forrest. He was opposed by two former MPs, Charles Moran and Barrington Wood, and won by polling just two votes more than Moran. Prior to the 1904 election, Pigott's seat was abolished. He attempted to transfer to the new seat of Kimberley, but was unsuccessful, losing to Francis Connor. After leaving parliament, Pigott returned to the pearling trade, and also served briefly on the Broome Municipal Council. He moved to London in 1915, setting up as a pearl merchant, and later lived in Bournemouth and Hove. Pigott died in April 1927, aged 60.

== Family ==
In 1900 Sydney married June née Callanan (1857-1912), widow of Richard Bowden Skamp (1849-1890) with whom she had five children. Jane, and two of Sydney's step-daughters - Alice Beatrice Skamp (1882-1912) and Geneviéve Callanan Skamp (1885-1912) - were lost at sea in the Koombana disaster in 1912. After his Jane's death, in 1916 he married Margaret Robertson née Smith (1879-1918) and had a son, Stanley Capel Pigott (1918-1994). Margaret died a few days after Stanley's birth and Sydney wed a third time the following year, to Jessie Maude Elliott (1878-1965).

Parliament of Western Australia
Preceded by Alexander Forrest	Member for West Kimberley; 1901–1904	Abolished
