= Charles Moran (Australian politician) =

Australian politician

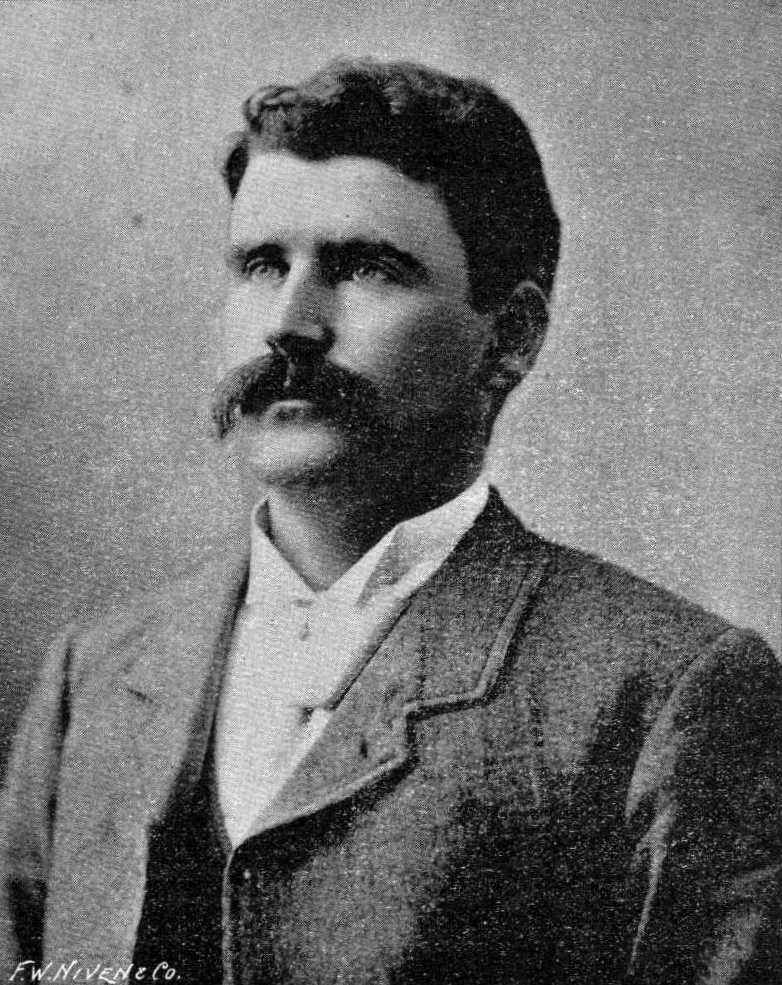

Member of the Legislative Assembly of Western Australia
- In office 9 July 1894 – 7 May 1897
- Preceded by: None (new seat)
- Succeeded by: William Oats
- Constituency: Yilgarn
- In office 7 May 1897 – 24 April 1901
- Preceded by: None (new seat)
- Succeeded by: None (abolished)
- Constituency: East Coolgardie
- In office 14 July 1902 – 27 October 1905
- Preceded by: George Leake
- Succeeded by: Frederick Illingworth
- Constituency: West Perth

Personal details
- Born: 20 November 1868 Toowoomba, Queensland, Australia
- Died: 18 December 1936 (aged 68) Subiaco, Western Australia, Australia

Charles John Moran (20 November 1868 – 18 December 1936) was an Australian politician who served in the Legislative Assembly of Western Australia from 1894 to 1901 and again from 1902 to 1905. He was a minister in the government of George Throssell.

== Early life ==
Moran was born in Toowoomba, Queensland, to Irish parents. He was educated at Catholic schools in Toowoomba and Brisbane, and matriculated to the University of Sydney, although he did not complete a degree there. Moran moved to Western Australia in 1890, and initially worked as an apprentice to architect Andrea Stombuco, superintending part of the construction of the General Post Office Building in Perth. He left for the Eastern Goldfields in 1893, working for a water supply contractor, and subsequently participated in the abortive Siberia rush.

== Politics ==
Moran stood for parliament at the 1894 general election, aged 25, and was elected to the new seat of Yilgarn. His opponent was Lancel de Hamel, who had been in parliament since 1889. At the 1897 election, Moran transferred to the new seat of East Coolgardie. When George Throssell replaced Sir John Forrest as premier in early 1901, he was appointed Commissioner of Crown Lands in his new ministry. However, Throssell's government lasted for little more than three months before he was replaced as premier by George Leake, and Moran was not retained as a minister.

At the 1901 election, the seat of East Coolgardie was abolished, and Moran unsuccessfully attempted to transfer to the new seat of Kalgoorlie. He was defeated by the Labor candidate, William Johnson. Later in the year, Moran also contested the West Kimberley by-election, but was defeated by Sydney Pigott. Moran eventually re-entered parliament at the 1902 West Perth by-election, which had been caused by the death of the premier, George Leake. He was re-elected at the 1904 state election, but at the 1905 election attempted to transfer to the seat of Perth. He was unsuccessful, losing to the sitting member, Harry Brown.

== Later life ==
In 1907, Moran purchased a farm in Wagin (in the Great Southern region). He subsequently became prominent in agricultural circles, and was a trustee of the Agricultural Bank of Western Australia from 1921 to 1930. Moran died in Perth in 1936, aged 68. He had married Elizabeth Healy on 28 August 1895, with whom he had three sons and three daughters.

Parliament of Western Australia
New seat	Member for Yilgarn; 1894–1897	Succeeded by William Oats
New seat	Member for East Coolgardie; 1897–1901	Abolished
Preceded by George Leake	Member for West Perth; 1902–1905	Succeeded by Frederick Illingworth
Political offices
Preceded by George Throssell	Commissioner of Crown Lands; 1901	Succeeded by Charles Sommers
