= Francis McDonald (politician) =

Australian politician

Member of the Legislative Assembly of Western Australia
- In office 24 April 1901 – 28 June 1904
- Preceded by: None (new seat)
- Succeeded by: None (abolished)
- Constituency: Cockburn Sound

Personal details
- Born: 1 January 1860 Dunbeath, Caithness, Scotland
- Died: 13 May 1938 (aged 78) Beverley, Western Australia, Australia

Francis McDonald (1 January 1860 – 13 May 1938) was an Australian politician who was a member of the Legislative Assembly of Western Australia from 1901 to 1904, representing the seat of Cockburn Sound.

McDonald was born in Dunbeath, Caithness, Scotland, to Annie (née Grant) and James McDonald. After a period in New South Wales, he came to Western Australia in 1892, starting a business in Fremantle. McDonald was elected to the East Fremantle Municipal Council upon its formation in 1897 and served as mayor from 1900 to 1903. At the 1901 state election, he won the newly created seat of Cockburn Sound, which took in the area immediately south of Fremantle. The seat was abolished at the 1904 election, and later in the year McDonald purchased a farm at Beverley (in the Wheatbelt). He contested the seat of Beverley at the 1905 election, but was defeated by Edmund Smith. McDonald remained in Beverley for the rest of his life, dying there in May 1938 (aged 78).

== See also ==
- List of mayors of East Fremantle

Parliament of Western Australia
New seat	Member for Cockburn Sound; 1901–1904	Abolished
