= Frederick Moorhead =

Australian politician

Frederick Moorhead KC
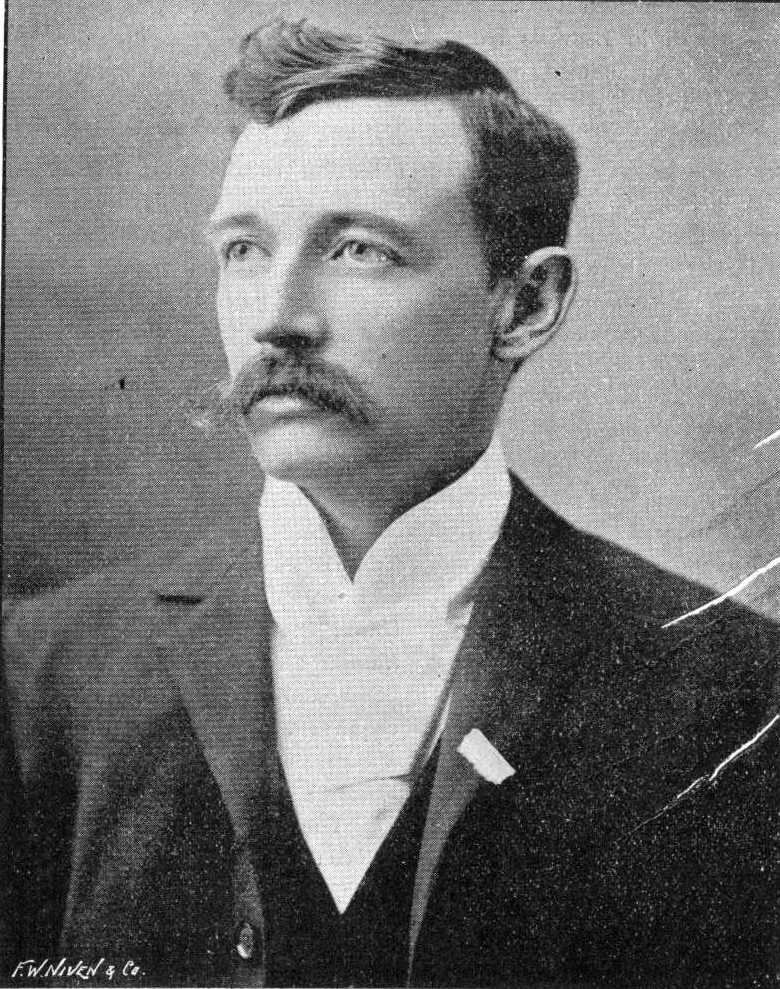

Justice of the Supreme Court of Western Australia
- In office 24 April – 27 November 1902
- Preceded by: None (new position)
- Succeeded by: Robert Bruce Burnside

Attorney-General of Western Australia
- In office 21 November – 23 December 1901
- Premier: Alf Morgans
- Preceded by: George Leake
- Succeeded by: George Leake

Member of the Legislative Assembly of Western Australia
- In office 13 October 1899 – 10 December 1901
- Preceded by: Henry Kenny
- Succeeded by: John Holman
- Constituency: North Murchison

Personal details
- Born: 1863 King's County, Ireland
- Died: 27 November 1902 (aged 38–39) West Perth, Western Australia, Australia

Frederick William Moorhead KC (1863 – 27 November 1902) was an Australian barrister, politician, and judge. He was born in Ireland and emigrated to Western Australia in 1889. Moorhead was a member of the Legislative Assembly of Western Australia from 1899 to 1901, and briefly served as the state's attorney-general in the government of Alf Morgans. He was appointed to the Supreme Court of Western Australia in April 1902, but died after only seven months in office.

== Early life ==
Moorhead was born in King's County, Ireland, to Elizabeth (née Humphrys) and Michael J. Moorhead. He attended St Stanislaus College before going on to Trinity College Dublin, where he studied arts and laws. He was called to the bar in 1887. In his youth, Moorhead was a talented association football player. A representative of Dublin University A.F.C., he played a single match for the Irish national team, appearing against England during the 1884–85 British Home Championship. Moorhead moved to Australia in 1889, and opened a law firm in Perth. He was admitted to the Western Australian bar the following year.

== Parliamentary career ==
Moorhead first attempted to enter parliament at an 1895 Legislative Council by-election for Central Province, but lost to William Alexander (by only seven votes). At the 1897 general election, he stood for the Legislative Assembly, but lost to Henry Kenny in the seat of North Murchison. However, Kenny died in August 1899, and Moorhead was successful at the resulting by-election. He was re-elected at the 1901 general election.

In November 1901, Alf Morgans replaced George Leake as premier, and appointed Moorhead as attorney-general in his new ministry. Under the state constitution at the time, newly appointed ministers were required to resign and recontest their seats in a ministerial by-election. These were often uncontested, but the outgoing premier, Leake, organised opposing candidates in each seat. Moorhead and two other ministers (Matthew Moss and Frank Wilson) were defeated, resulting in the collapse of the Morgans government after just over a month.

== Later life ==
After his electoral defeat, Moorhead returned to his law practice. He had been appointed Queen's Counsel (QC) in 1900, and was regarded as one of the most capable barristers in the state. In April 1902, Moorhead was appointed as a puisne judge of the Supreme Court, joining Edward Stone (the chief justice), Alfred Hensman (who died in October 1902), and Stephen Henry Parker on the bench. Prior to his appointment, the court had had only three justices, but an additional justice was deemed necessary to alleviate their workload. However, in November 1902, Moorhead suffered a mental and physical breakdown. He had suffered from locomotor ataxia since an accident in 1897, but his breakdown brought on what was described as a "general paralysis", which he never recovered from.

Moorhead died at his home in West Perth in late November. His funeral was held two days later at St Mary's Cathedral, Perth, and he was afterward buried in Karrakatta Cemetery. Moorhead had married Amy Campbell (née Monger) in 1891, with whom he had one daughter, but he was widowed in 1900. His wife was a daughter of John Henry Monger and a sister of Frederick Charles Monger, both of whom were members of parliament.

Parliament of Western Australia
Preceded by Henry Kenny	Member for North Murchison; 1899–1901	Succeeded by John Holman
Political offices
Preceded by George Leake	Attorney-General; 1901	Succeeded by George Leake
