= Electoral district of Cockburn Sound =

Former electoral district in Perth, Western Australia

Cockburn Sound Western Australia—Legislative Assembly
- State: Western Australia
- Dates current: 1901–1904
- Namesake: Cockburn Sound

Cockburn Sound was an electoral district of the Legislative Assembly in the Australian state of Western Australia from 1901 to 1904.

Located south of Fremantle, the district existed for one term. In that time, it was represented by Opposition politician Francis McDonald.

== Members ==
Member	Party	Term
Francis McDonald	Opposition	1901–1904
