= 1890 Western Australian colonial election =

- December 1890
- Map showing electoral districts used for the election

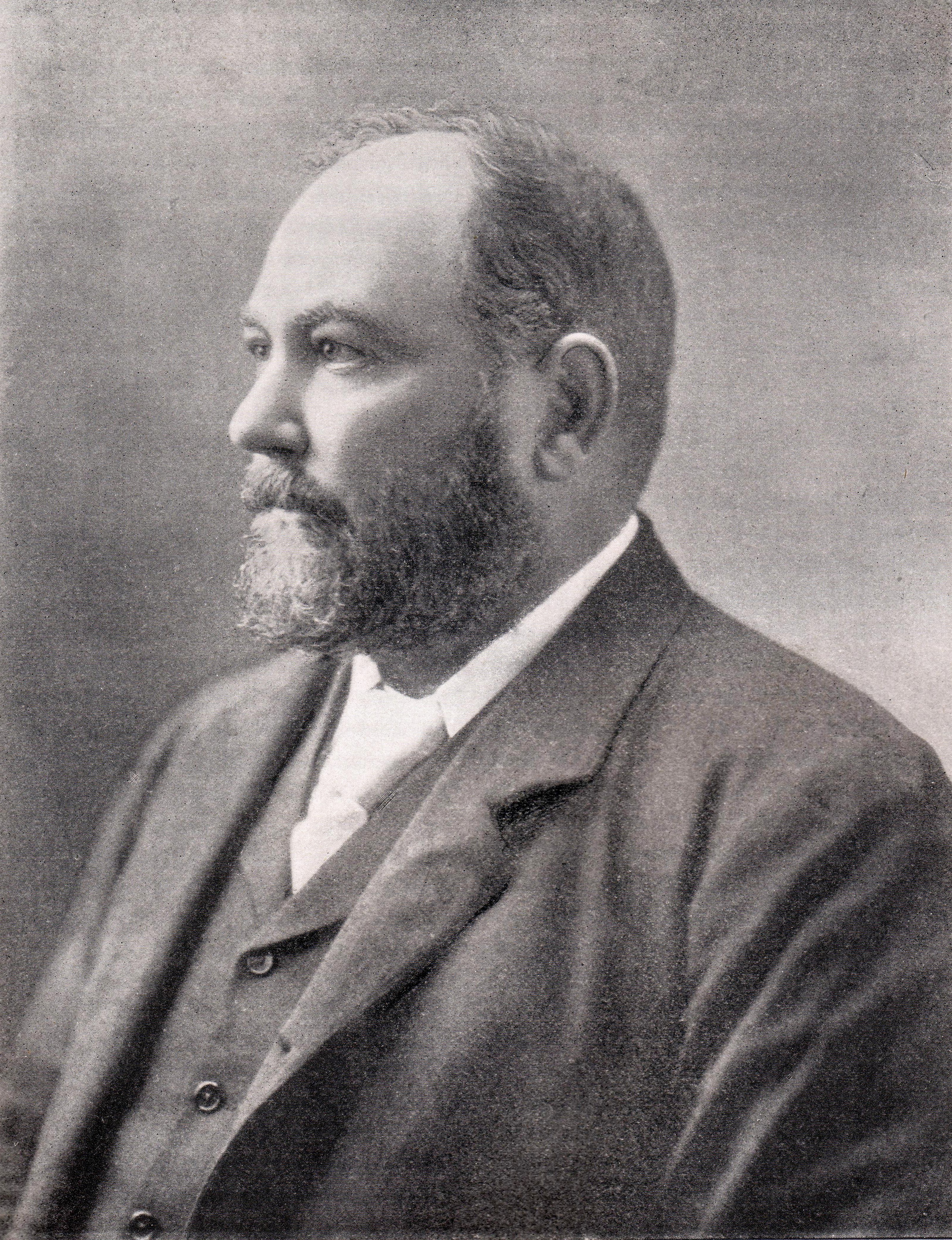
John Forrest was elected unopposed to the seat of Bunbury on 11 December 1890, and 18 days later was sworn in as Western Australia's first premier.

Elections were held in the Colony of Western Australia in December 1890 to elect 30 members to the Legislative Assembly. They were the first elections to be held for the Legislative Assembly, which had been created earlier in the year by a new constitution that granted Western Australia responsible self-government.

== Background ==
Historian Brian De Garis describes the 1890 election as "a rather quiet affair". There were no organised political parties (or even factions), and no government to be voted in or out of office. The Legislative Assembly had been established by Western Australia's new constitution, which was enacted by the Parliament of the United Kingdom on 21 August 1890 and proclaimed in Perth on 21 October 1890. Prior to that, the Legislative Council, an only partially elective body, had been the sole chamber of parliament.

== Timeline ==
Close of nominations

- 27 November: East Kimberley, Gascoyne, Irwin, West Kimberley
- 28 November: Nelson, Roebourne
- 29 November: Ashburton, Greenough, Moore, Murchison, Plantagenet
- 2 December: Albany, Geraldton, Northam, Wellington, Williams, York
- 3 December: Bunbury, Murray, Sussex, Swan
- 4 December: Beverley, De Grey, East Perth, Perth, Toodyay, West Perth
- 5 December: Fremantle, North Fremantle, South Fremantle

Polling day

- 5 December: Nelson
- 6 December: Ashburton, Irwin, Plantagenet
- 8 December: Greenough, Roebourne
- 9 December: Albany, Gascoyne, Moore, Murchison, Williams
- 10 December: Beverley, East Perth, Geraldton, Murray, Perth, Wellington, West Perth
- 11 December: Bunbury, Fremantle, North Fremantle, South Fremantle
- 12 December: De Grey, East Kimberley, Northam, Sussex, Swan, Toodyay, West Kimberley, York

== Results ==
Only 11 out of the 30 seats were contested at the election, and only two were contested by more than two candidates. Prior to the election, there had been some doubts expressed (notably by Septimus Burt) as to whether enough suitable candidates would come forward. In several uncontested electorates, an informal election was held before the official polling day, in which members of local organisations determined their preferred representative.

== Aftermath ==
The Governor of Western Australia, Sir William Robinson, decided that he would not commission a government until the elections had been held. It had initially been assumed that Stephen Henry Parker would be chosen as Western Australia's first premier, but John Forrest actively sought the position, arguing that he was the only candidate with prior governmental experience (as a former Surveyor-General). Governor Robinson asked Forrest to form a government on 22 December 1890, and he and the rest of his new ministry were sworn in on 29 December.
