= Henry Kenny (Australian politician) =

Australian politician

Member of the Western Australian Legislative Assembly
- In office 3 May 1897 – 25 August 1899
- Preceded by: None (new seat)
- Succeeded by: Frederick Moorhead
- Constituency: North Murchison

Personal details
- Born: 1 March 1853 North Fremantle, Western Australia
- Died: 25 August 1899 (aged 46) Perth, Western Australia

Henry Edward Kenny (1 March 1853 – 25 August 1899) was an Australian newspaper proprietor and politician who was a member of the Western Australian Legislative Assembly from 1897 to 1899, representing the electoral district of North Murchison.

Kenny was born in North Fremantle, Western Australia, to Bridget (née Reynolds) and John Kenny. He had moved to Geraldton by 1879, working initially as a storekeeper and later as a draper. Kenny later developed interests in mining (on the Murchison goldfields), but came to the attention of the public as the manager of the Geraldton Express, the major newspaper in the region. He eventually became its chief proprietor. From 1883 to 1887, Kenny was a councillor for the Town of Geraldton. Kenny was elected to parliament at the 1897 general election, winning the newly created seat of North Murchison. However, his time in parliament was short-lived, as he died from stomach cancer in August 1899, aged 46. He had married a widow, Albina Tregonning (née Nicolay), in 1878, with whom he had two children.

Parliament of Western Australia
New seat	Member for North Murchison; 1897–1899	Succeeded by Frederick Moorhead
