= Electoral district of North Murchison =

Former electoral district of Western Australia

North Murchison Western Australia—Legislative Assembly
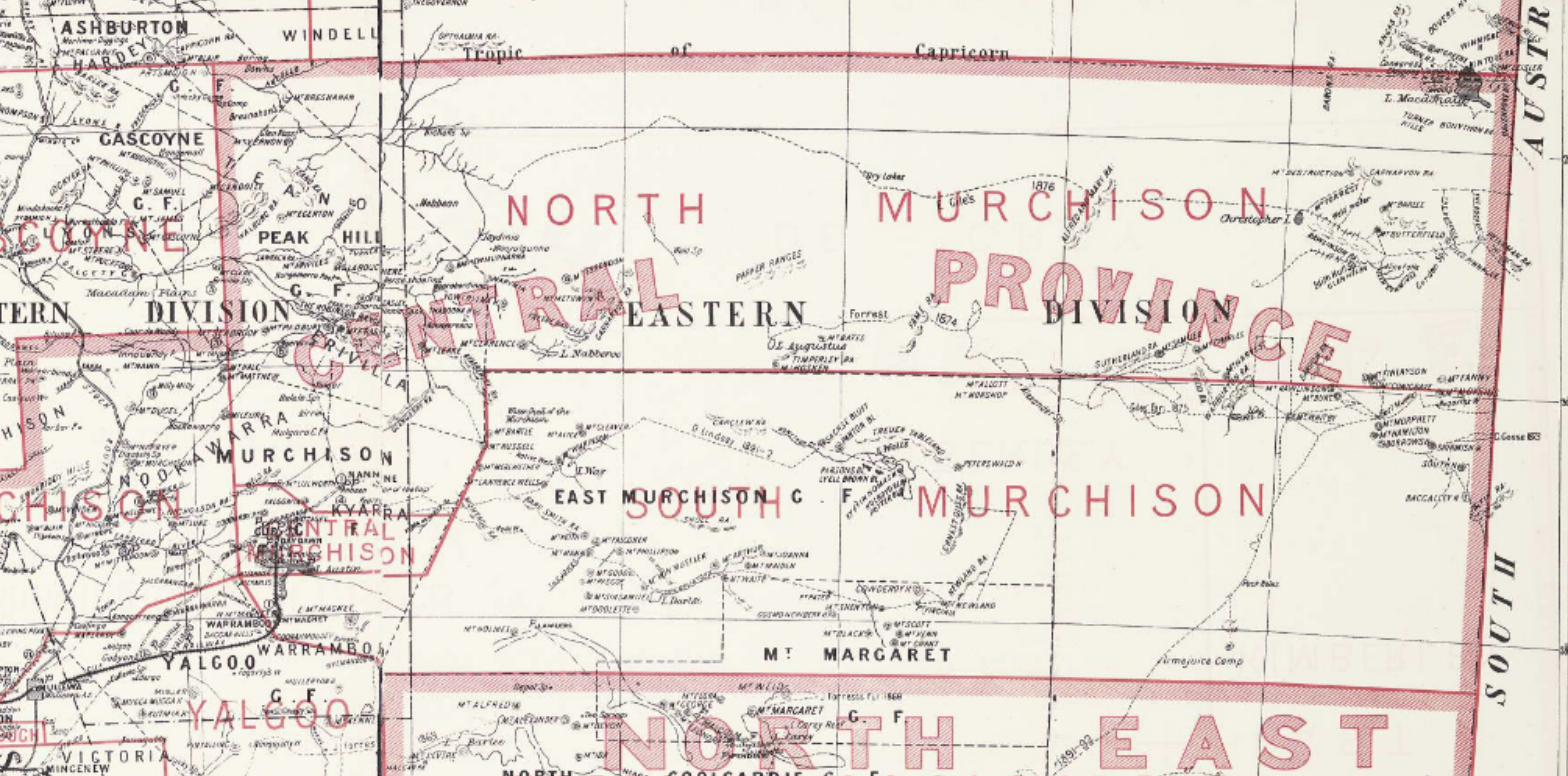
- North Murchison in 1898
- State: Western Australia
- Dates current: 1897–1904
- Namesake: Murchison region

North Murchison (or Murchison North) was an electoral district of the Legislative Assembly in the Australian state of Western Australia from 1897 to 1904.

The district was located in the Western Australian outback. It existed for two terms of parliament, but had three members and staged two by-elections in that time. In 1898, its major settlement was the town of Nannine, and it included the Peak Hill goldfield and some pastoral leases such as Moorarie Station. Its first member was Henry Kenny, who died two years into his term in May 1899. The subsequent by-election saw Frederick Moorhead elected to fill the vacancy. Moorhead retained the seat at the 1901 state election but afterward resigned his seat after being appointed minister, as was the convention at the time. Moorhead was defeated in the ensuing by-election by Labor candidate John Holman. When the district was abolished ahead of the 1904 state election, Holman instead won election to the seat of Murchison.

== Members for North Murchison ==
Member	Party	Term
Henry Kenny	Opposition	1897–1899
Frederick Moorhead	Ministerial	1899–1901
John Holman	Labour	1901–1904
