= George Throssell =

Australian politician

The Honourable George Throssell CMG

2nd Premier of Western Australia
- In office 15 February – 27 May 1901
- Monarch: Edward VII
- Governor: Sir Gerard Smith; Sir Arthur Lawley
- Preceded by: Sir John Forrest
- Succeeded by: George Leake

Member of the Legislative Assembly of Western Australia
- In office 2 December 1890 – 28 June 1904
- Preceded by: None (new creation)
- Succeeded by: Alfred Watts
- Constituency: Northam

Member of the Legislative Council of Western Australia
- In office 12 August 1907 – 30 August 1910
- Preceded by: Charles Dempster
- Succeeded by: Warren Marwick
- Constituency: East Province

Personal details
- Born: 23 May 1840 Fermoy, County Cork, Ireland
- Died: 30 August 1910 (aged 70) Northam, Western Australia, Australia
- Spouse: Anne Morrell (m. 1861; died 1906)
- Relations: Hugo Throssell (son); Ric Throssell (grandson)
- Occupation: Businessman

George Throssell CMG (23 May 1840 – 30 August 1910) was an Australian businessman and politician. He was the second premier of Western Australia, serving only for three months in 1901. He was a major figure in the development of Northam, Western Australia.

Throssell was born in County Cork, Ireland. His father was a Pensioner Guard who moved the family to the colony of Western Australia in 1850. He was orphaned at the age of fifteen and after a period working for Walter Padbury settled in Northam. He amassed significant business and agricultural interests around the town and was prominent in community organisations and the temperance movement. Throssell was mayor of Northam from 1887 to 1894 and was an inaugural member of the Western Australian Legislative Assembly, serving from 1890 to 1904. An ally of Premier John Forrest, he was Commissioner of Crown Lands from 1897 and 1901 and then succeeded Forrest as premier in 1901. He resigned when his government failed to secure a majority at the 1901 state election. He did not hold ministerial office again but was a member of the Legislative Council from 1907 until his death in 1910.

== Early life ==
Throssell was born on 24 May 1840 in Fermoy, County Cork, Ireland. He was the son of Jane Ann (née Ledsham) and George Michael Throssell. His father was employed as a mail clerk at the time of his birth.

In 1850, Throssell arrived in the colony of Western Australia on Scindian, a convict ship on which his father served as a Pensioner Guard. The family initially settled in Fremantle where his father was a gatekeeper at the Convict Establishment. By 1853 they had moved to Perth where his father became a policeman. Throssell's mother died in 1854 and his father in 1855, leaving him an orphan shortly before his 15th birthday and responsible for his three younger siblings. He accompanied them to Adelaide, arranging for his sister to live with relatives in South Australia and his brother to live with relatives in New South Wales.

Throssell was educated at the Perth Boys' School. After returning to Perth he began working for the merchant firm of Walter Padbury, eventually becoming manager of its Guildford office. He attended evening classes at the Swan River Mechanics' Institute.

== Business career and public life ==
Throssell in 1888

In 1861, Throssell settled in Northam, Western Australia, near the farming property of his father-in-law Richard Morrell. He established a general store and also served as the local postmaster. Over time he amassed a wide range of business interests and was regarded as "the region's most successful businessman". Throssell established wheat farms and orchards in the surrounding district and acquired blocks of land near the townsite, where he established a subdivision named Throssellton. He owned a flour mill and acted as a building contractor, also holding interests in blacksmithing, wheelwrights and the manufacture of agricultural machinery.

Throssell benefited greatly from the 1887 gold rush, with Northam being the newly established terminus of the Eastern Railway and the last staging point for prospectors and miners bound for the new goldfields at Southern Cross. He advertised his wares to new arrivals at the port of Fremantle and in 1890 opened a larger emporium in Northam. He also established a branch of his firm on the goldfield.

Throssell served as mayor of Northam from 1887 to 1894, having become an inaugural member of the Northam Municipal Council in 1879. He was a founding member of the Northam Mechanics' Institute and was active in various other community organisations. In 1873, apparently under the influence of visiting Methodist minister William Traylen, Throssell became a committed teetotaller and founded a local branch of the Independent Order of Good Templars. His commitment to the temperance movement was such that he surrendered his store's liquor licence and interest in a local pub.

== Politics ==
Throssell c. 1900

Throssell was elected as an inaugural member of the Western Australian Legislative Assembly at the 1890 general election, winning the seat of Northam. He would be re-elected to the seat on three further occasions, being chosen unopposed on each occasion except for the 1894 election.

In parliament, Throssell advocated for land reform and supported Premier John Forrest's Homesteads Act and legislation to establish the Agricultural Bank of Western Australia. He successfully advocated for Northam to become the starting point of the Eastern Goldfields Railway, connecting it with Kalgoorlie and other major mining settlements. He nominated for the 1897 Australasian Federal Convention election, but withdrew upon his appointment as a minister. On 13 March 1897, Throssell was appointed Commissioner of Crown Lands in Forrest's government. He oversaw further land reforms including the subdivision of large estates under the Homesteads Land Purchase Act.

=== Premier, 1901 ===
On 15 February 1901, Throssell succeeded as Western Australia's second premier, following Forrest's resignation to enter the new federal parliament. He also replaced Forrest as state treasurer. He had previously served as acting premier while Forrest was in the eastern colonies, and received his support when a meeting of the Ministerialists – the name given to the faction which had supported Forrest's government – was convened to endorse a successor.

Throssell "inherited a disunited group with no organisational basis on the eve of an election and with a feeling abroad that it was 'time for a change'". By the time he became premier he had a substantial hearing loss and was reliant on a home-made hearing aid constructed from cardboard. In the lead-up to the 1901 state election, Throssell outlined the government's agenda at a speech in Northam but also commented that others were better suited to the role of premier and that the position "interfered too much with his leisure". Historian Brian De Garis later suggested that he likely saw defeat as inevitable and did not want to be embarrassed by campaigning too hard. He resigned as premier on 27 May 1901 after a little more than three months in office.

=== Final years ===
Throssell did not resume ministerial office after resigning as premier but remained in the Legislative Assembly as a backbencher until retiring at the 1904 election. He returned to parliament on 12 August 1907 after winning a Legislative Council by-election for East Province. He remained in parliament until his death in 1910.

== Personal life ==
In 1861, Throssell married Anne Morrell, with whom he had fourteen children. His son Hugo Throssell was a recipient of the Victoria Cross during World War I.

Throssell and his family initially lived in a single-storey residence near the confluence of the Avon and Mortlock Rivers. In 1897 he built a substantial two-storey residence in the Federation style. Both houses were named "Fermoy" after his birthplace in Ireland. The second house was later used as a private hospital, then incorporated into St Joseph's School, Northam. It was added to the State Register of Heritage Places in 2014 and cited as "one of only a few premiers' residences still in existence in the State".

Throssell was widowed in 1906. He died in Northam on 30 August 1910, aged 70, four days after falling down a staircase at his home and injuring his spine. He was survived by five sons and six daughters, with his estate valued for probate at £50,879 (equivalent to $7,900,000 in 2022).

== Honours and legacy ==
Throssell was made a Companion of the Order of Saint Michael and Saint George (CMG) in 1909. He was nicknamed the "lion of Northam".

In the Australian Dictionary of Biography, Donald S. Garden viewed Throssell's political legacy as limited, as "although a competent administrator, he was not a strong political leader and his deafness imposed limitations". Historian Geoffrey Bolton assessed Throssell as a self-made man, whose career "owed nothing to his parent's achievements [...] he belongs rather to the ranks of the colonial orphans who became Dick Whittingtons".

== Sources ==
- Hamilton, John (2013). The Price of Valour: The Triumph and Tragedy of a Gallipoli Hero, Hugo Throssell, VC. Sydney: Pan Macmillan. ISBN 9781742613369.

Political offices
Preceded by John Forrest	Premier of Western Australia; 1901	Succeeded by George Leake
