= 1897 Western Australian colonial election =

- 27 April – 26 May 1897

All 44 seats in the Western Australian Legislative Assembly
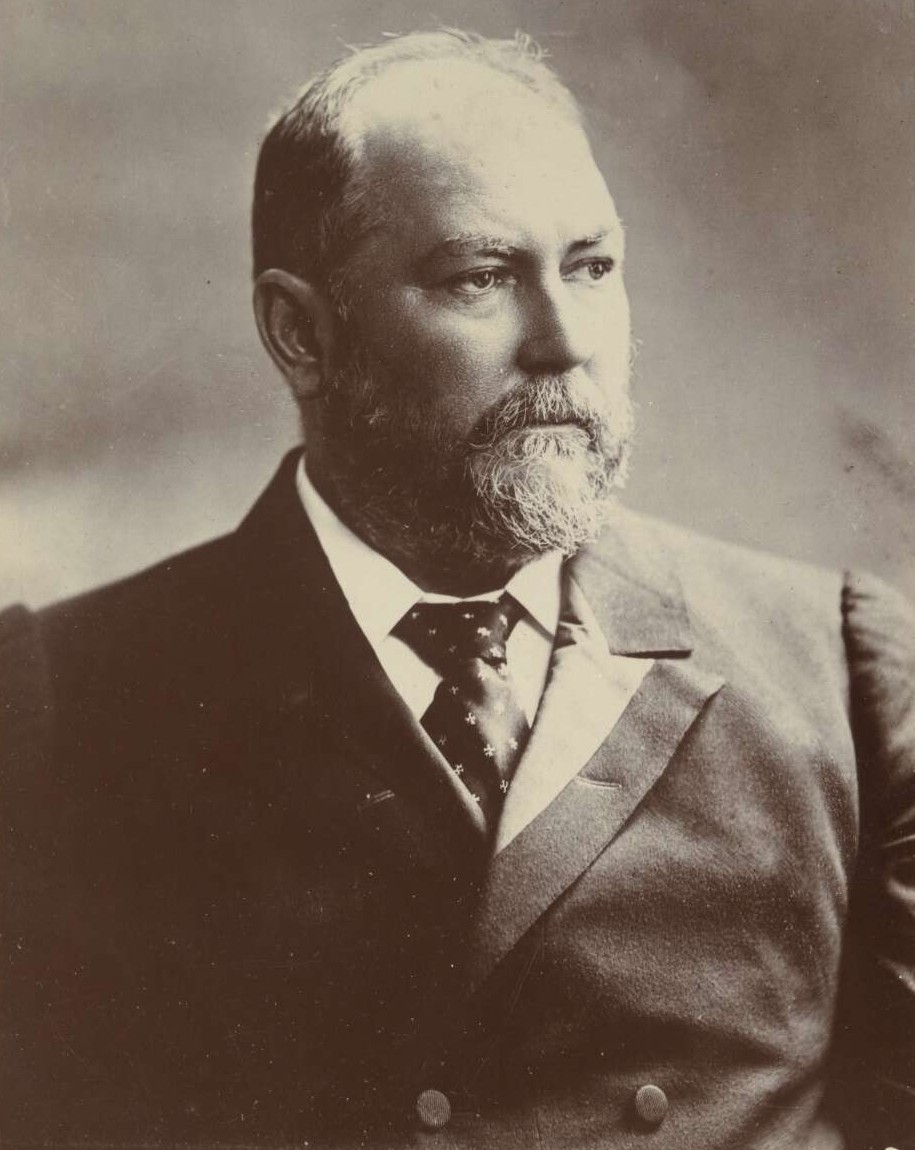

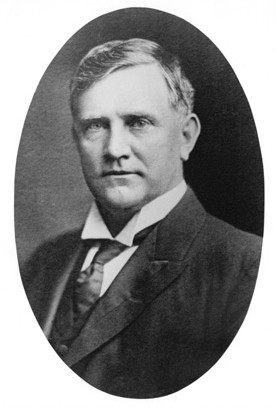
	First party	Second party
Leader	John Forrest	George Leake
Party	Ministerialist	Oppositionist
Leader since	22 December 1890	1895
Leader's seat	Bunbury	Albany
Last election	19 seats	13 seats
Seats won	29 seats	8 seats
Seat change	▲10	▼5
Percentage	49.80%	27.35%
- Winning party by electorate
Premier before election
John Forrest
Ministerialist
Elected Premier
John Forrest
Ministerialist

Elections were held in the state of Western Australia between 27 April and 26 May 1897 to elect 44 members to the Western Australian Legislative Assembly. The Ministerialist group led by John Forrest won a third term in office as a result of the elections. The poll took place based on boundaries established in the Constitution Act Amendment Act 1896, which increased the number of members from 33 mainly by adding new seats in the Goldfields region, and had been called a year earlier than was necessary. In 18 of the 44 seats, only one candidate nominated and polls were not held.

As payment of members was not introduced until 1900, the Political Labour Party, formed in 1896, had found it difficult to attract candidates who could afford to enter Parliament, but three of its candidates ran for election, and Charles Oldham, a former president of the Trades and Labor Council, became the first Labour member of Parliament in Western Australia.

== Results ==
Western Australian state election, 1897 Legislative Assembly
Enrolled voters	17,114^{[1]}				
Votes cast	9,016		Turnout	52.68%	
Informal votes	279		Informal	3.09%	
Summary of votes by party
Party	Primary votes	%	Swing	Seats	Change
Ministerialist	4,351	49.80%		29^{[1]}	+ 10
Opposition	2,390	27.35%		8	– 5
Independent	1,613	18.46%		6	+ 5
Labor	383	4.38%	+4.38%	1	+ 1
Total	8,737			44	

Notes:

^{1} The Ministerialists' total of 29 seats includes 16 which were uncontested, representing 4,297 of the 23,318 enrolled voters. A further two seats, won by George Leake (Albany, Oppositionist) and Elias Solomon (South Fremantle, Independent) representing 1,907 enrolled voters were also uncontested.

== See also ==
- Members of the Western Australian Legislative Assembly, 1894–1897
- Members of the Western Australian Legislative Assembly, 1897–1901
