= Electoral district of De Grey =

Former electoral district in Western Australia

De Grey Western Australia—Legislative Assembly
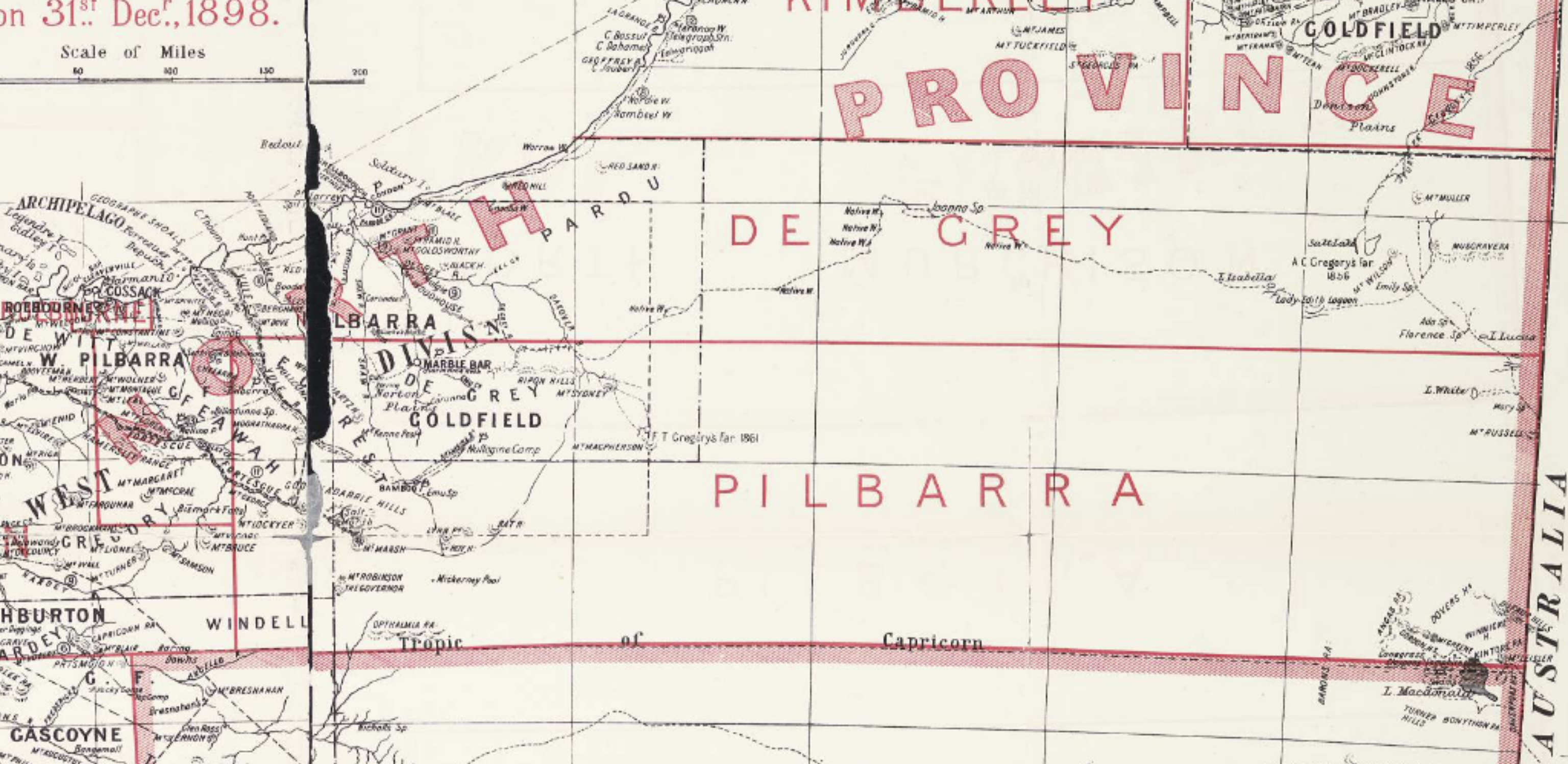
- De Grey and surrounds in 1898
- State: Western Australia
- Dates current: 1890–1901
- Namesake: De Grey River

De Grey was an electoral district of the Legislative Assembly in the Australian state of Western Australia from 1890 to 1901.

The district was located in the Western Australian outback, in the north of the state. It was one of the original 30 seats contested at the 1890 election but was abolished after three parliamentary terms. In 1898, it included the settlement of Condon together with various pastoral leases along the De Grey, Fortescue and Yule Rivers.

== Members for De Grey ==
Member	Party	Term
Alexander Richardson	Ministerial	1890–1897
E.T. Hooley	Ministerial	1897–1900
Leonard Darlot	Ministerial	1900–1901
