= Ministerialists and Oppositionists =

Former political groupings in Australia

Ministerialists and Oppositionists were political groupings in the political systems in a number of Australian colonies and states, used to describe supporters or opponents of the government of the day. The terminology had earlier been used in the same way in the United Kingdom.

Prior to federation in 1901 (and for a short period after) a formal political party structure was not fully in place, and the terminology was used in the parliaments of Queensland, Victoria and Western Australia.

Outside of parliamentary groupings, the terminology was also used at various elections.

== Western Australia ==
At the establishment of the Parliament of Western Australia in 1890, Ministerialists were defined as those who supported the government of the day (led by John Forrest), while Oppositionists were opposed to it. Multiple candidates for each grouping could run for a given seat. The Australian Labor Party (ALP) was the only major grouping outside this structure. Additionally, some candidates ran as independents.

At the 1901 election, the Ministerialists (aligned with Forrest) lost to the Oppositionists (led by George Leake). However, the labels stuck to the groupings; the Oppositionists formed the ministry and the Ministerialists formed the opposition. This strange nomenclature ceased with the defeat of the Oppositionists by the Ministerialists in 1904. Around this point, the term "Oppositionist" ceased to be used. The Ministerialists were then to retain power until their defeat by the ALP at the 1911 election.

Immediately after this, the Ministerialist grouping became the centre-right Western Australian Liberal Party under the continued guidance of John Forrest.

Despite the centre-right parties being in opposition at the time, the Ministerialist term was still at times used to describe them in WA politics in the 1920s and 1940s. The term had long ceased to have any connection to the holding of ministries.

== See also ==
- Ministerialist members of the Parliament of Victoria
