= 1901 Western Australian state election =

State election in Western Australia in 1901

- 24 April 1901

All 50 seats in the Western Australian Legislative Assembly
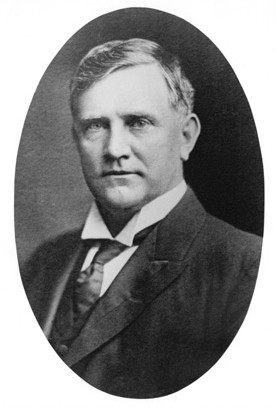

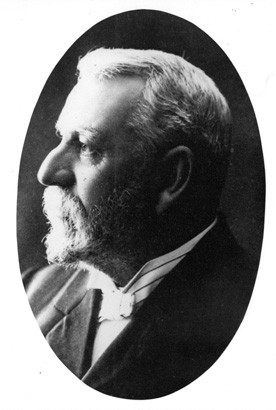
	First party	Second party	Third party
			LAB
Leader	George Leake	George Throssell	No leader
Party	Oppositionist	Ministerialist	Labour
Leader since	May 1901	15 February 1901	N/A
Leader's seat	West Perth	Northam	N/A
Last election	8 seats	29 seats	1 seats
Seats won	20 seats	19 seats	6 seats
Seat change	▲12	▼10	▲5
Percentage	40.49%	20.23%	25.88%
Swing	▲11.01	▼29.57	▲21.50
Premier before election
George Throssell
Ministerialist
Elected Premier
George Leake
Oppositionist

Elections were held in the state of Western Australia on 24 April 1901 to elect 50 members to the Western Australian Legislative Assembly. It was the first election to take place since responsible government without the towering presence of Premier Sir John Forrest, who had left state politics two months earlier to enter the first Federal parliament representing the Division of Swan, and the first state parliamentary election to follow the enactment of women's suffrage in 1899.

The Ministerial group, led by Forrest's nominated successor George Throssell, ran a half-hearted campaign for government, with Throssell saying in a policy speech that while he would continue to serve as Premier if required, "it was not the class of political life he desired, as it interfered too much with his leisure." Meanwhile, the Opposition had no clear leader, with the Parliamentary leader Frederick Illingworth and George Leake, who was seeking to return to Parliament in the election, both apparently contenders. The groups were neither formal nor organised, with many members and candidates professing rather confused allegiances and running their own campaigns on local issues.

Following the introduction of payment of members in 1900, which effectively allowed electors without independent means to sit in Parliament, the Labour Party offered 22 candidates to the voters compared to three at the previous election, each of which was pledged to the party's platform. The Westralian Worker newspaper, launched six months earlier, was used to publicise the campaign. They ultimately won six seats, of which five were located in the Goldfields.

No clear winner emerged, and considerable instability resulted as three Ministries either resigned or were defeated on a want of confidence motion. The situation was ultimately resolved when half of the Morgans Ministry were defeated in ministerial by-elections in December 1901, which gave the Opposition a narrow majority with Independent or Labour support.

The election took place based on boundaries established in the Constitution Act Amendment Act 1899, which increased the number of members from 44 to 50 and reflected demographic changes—the Pilbara region lost two seats as did the Murchison region, whilst five seats were created in Kalgoorlie and the Eastern Goldfields and four seats were created in the Perth metropolitan area. The election was conducted under the first past the post system, and electorates had a wide variety of numbers of enrolled voters, ranging from 108 at East Kimberley to 7,024 at Hannans—nine electorates had 500 or less, whilst the same number had 3,000 or more.

== Results ==
Western Australian state election, 24 April 1901 Legislative Assembly
Enrolled voters	82,742^{[1]}				
Votes cast	38,100		Turnout	46.05%	–6.65%
Informal votes	776		Informal	2.04%	–1.05%
Summary of votes by party
Party	Primary votes	%	Swing	Seats	Change
Opposition	15,114	40.49%	+11.01%	20	+ 12
Ministerialist	7,549	20.23%	^{[2]}	19	– 10
Labor	9,658	25.88%	+21.50%	6	+ 5
Independent	5,003	13.40%	–5.06%	5	– 1
Total	37,324			50	

== See also ==
- Members of the Western Australian Legislative Assembly, 1897–1901
- Members of the Western Australian Legislative Assembly, 1901–1904

== Notes ==
^{1} The total number of enrolled voters was 91,525, of whom 8,780 were registered in nine uncontested seats—five of which were won by Ministerialists, three by Oppositionists and one by an Independent. The substantial rise in the number of voters from the 1897 election, where 23,318 voters were enrolled, reflected changes to eligibility criteria, including the enactment of women's suffrage, in the Constitution Act Amendment Act 1899.
^{2} Many supporters of the former Ministry, as argued by de Garis (Stannage, p.348), who eschewed party politics on principle but could be counted on to support the Ministerialist group, went to the election as Independents. This may partly explain the apparent disparity of votes to seats won in the election.
