= Electoral district of Plantagenet =

Former electoral district in Western Australia

Plantagenet Western Australia—Legislative Assembly
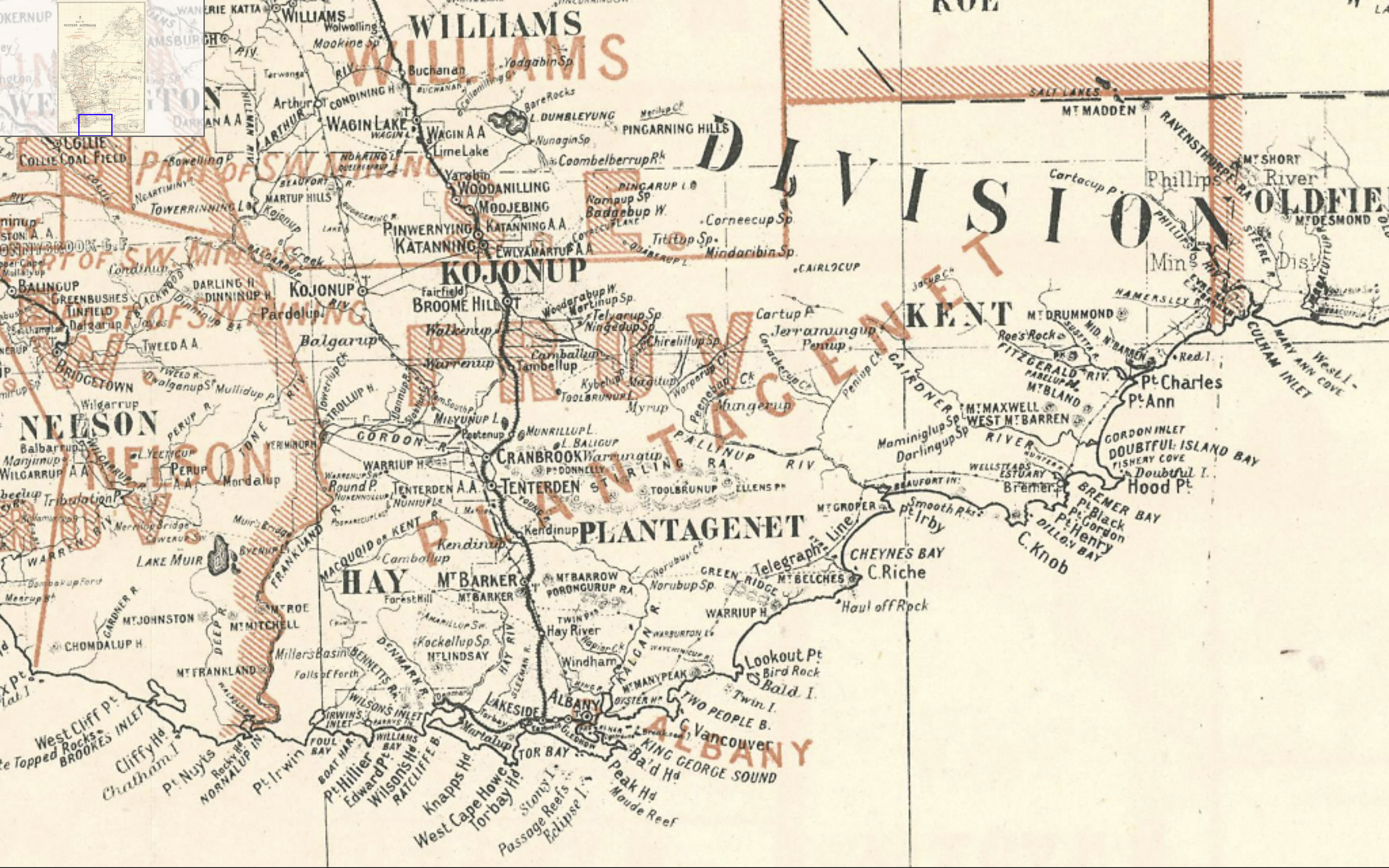
- Plantagenet and surrounds in 1900
- State: Western Australia
- Dates current: 1890–1904
- Namesake: Plantagenet Land District

Plantagenet was an electoral district of the Legislative Assembly in Western Australia from 1890 to 1904.

The district, located in the Great Southern area of the state, was one of the original 30 seats contested at the 1890 election. In 1900, the seat included a number of towns along the Great Southern Railway, including Broomehill, Tambellup, Cranbrook, Tenterden, Kendenup, and Mount Barker, as well as Kojonup, Denmark, and Jerramungup. It excluded Albany which had its own seat. Plantagenet existed for four terms of parliament, electing the same member, Albert Hassell, on each occasion.

== Members for Plantagenet ==
Member	Party	Term
Albert Hassell	Ministerial	1890–1901
Albert Hassell	Opposition	1901–1904
