= Electoral district of Northam =

Former state electoral district of Western Australia

Northam Western Australia—Legislative Assembly
- State: Western Australia
- Dates current: 1890–1974
- Namesake: Northam

Northam was an electoral district of the Legislative Assembly in the Australian state of Western Australia from 1890 to 1974.

The district was based on the town of Northam lying to the east of Perth. It was one of the original 30 seats contested at the 1890 election. The district was abolished at the 1974 election. Its last member, Ken McIver of the Labor Party, went on to become the member for Avon.

Northam was represented by five members over the course of its 84-year history. Three of those members served as premier of Western Australia: George Throssell (premier 1901), James Mitchell (premier 1919–1924 & 1930–1933) and Albert Hawke (premier 1953–1959).

== Members ==
Member	Party	Term
George Throssell	Ministerial	1890–1904
Alfred Watts	Labor	1904–1905
James Mitchell	Ministerial	1905–1911
James Mitchell	Liberal (WA)	1911–1917
James Mitchell	Nationalist	1917–1933
Albert Hawke	Labor	1933–1968
Ken McIver	Labor	1968–1974
