= Electoral district of West Kimberley =

Former electoral district in Western Australia

West Kimberley Western Australia—Legislative Assembly
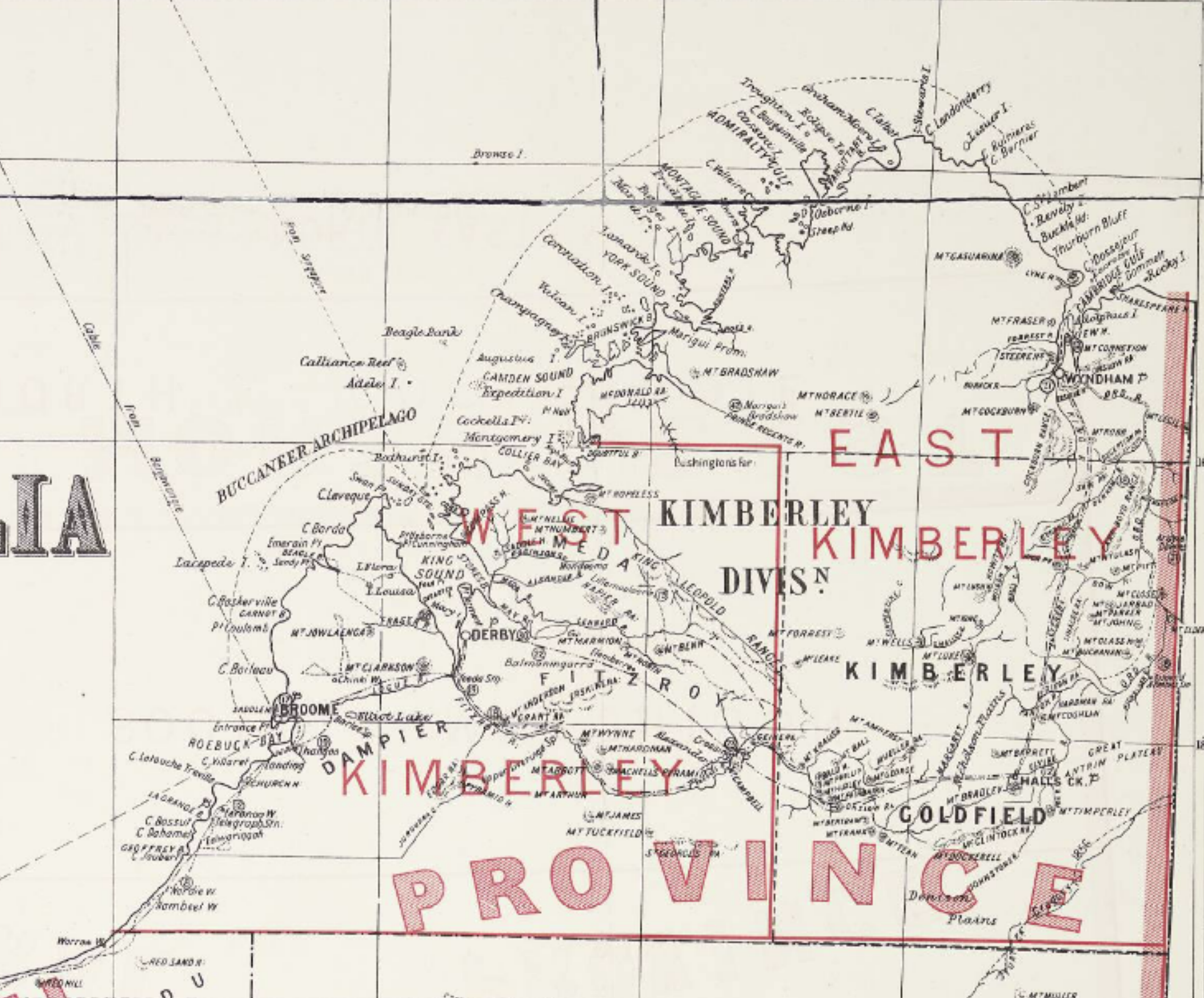
- East and West Kimberley in 1898
- State: Western Australia
- Dates current: 1890–1904
- Namesake: Kimberley

West Kimberley was an electoral district of the Legislative Assembly in the Australian state of Western Australia from 1890 to 1904.

Based in the western part of the Kimberley region, the district was one of the original 30 seats contested at the 1890 election. In 1898, its major settlements were Broome and Derby. It ceased to exist at the 1904 election, at which point it was amalgamated with the district of East Kimberley to form the new district of Kimberley.

== Members ==
Member	Party	Term
Alexander Forrest	Ministerial	1890–1901
Sydney Pigott	Ministerial	1901–1904
