= George Leake =

Australian politician

The Honourable George Leake CMG KC
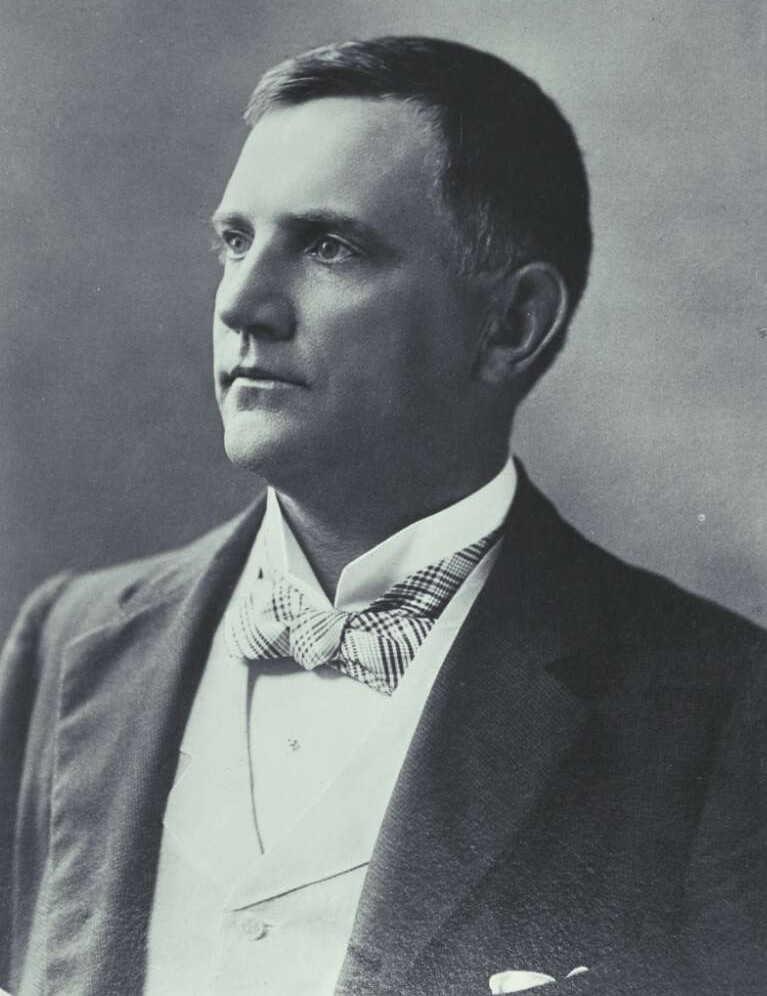

3rd Premier of Western Australia
- Monarch: Edward VII
- Governor: Sir Arthur Lawley
- In office 27 May – 21 November 1901
- Preceded by: George Throssell
- Succeeded by: Alf Morgans
- In office 23 December 1901 – 24 June 1902
- Preceded by: Alf Morgans
- Succeeded by: Walter James

Member of the Legislative Council of Western Australia
- In office 7 September – 3 December 1886; 4 January – 6 March 1888
- Constituency: None (nominated by governor)

Member of the Legislative Assembly of Western Australia
- In office 28 November 1890 – 30 December 1890
- Preceded by: None (new creation)
- Succeeded by: Horace Sholl
- Constituency: Roebourne
- In office 23 June 1894 – 2 August 1900
- Preceded by: Lancel de Hamel
- Succeeded by: John Hassell
- Constituency: Albany
- In office 24 April 1901 – 24 June 1902
- Preceded by: Barrington Wood
- Succeeded by: Charles Moran
- Constituency: West Perth

Personal details
- Born: 3 December 1856 Perth, Western Australia
- Died: 24 June 1902 (aged 45) Perth, Western Australia
- Spouse: Louisa Emily Burt (m. 1881)

George Leake CMG KC (3 December 1856 – 24 June 1902) was the third Premier of Western Australia, serving from May to November 1901 and then again from December 1901 to his death.

Leake was born in Perth, into a prominent local family. Studying law, he was called to the bar in 1880, and in 1883 was appointed Crown Solicitor and Public Prosecutor (the equivalent of solicitor-general). Leake first entered parliament in 1886, when he served briefly in the Legislative Council. He was again briefly a member of that body in 1888. In 1890, Leake was elected unopposed to the Legislative Assembly (representing the seat of Roebourne), but he resigned shortly after in order to continue as Crown Solicitor.

In 1894, Leake re-entered the Legislative Assembly, representing the seat of Albany. An opponent of the government of John Forrest, he began to be regarded as the Leader of the Opposition, although that position was unofficial at the time. Forrest eventually resigned as premier in 1901 to enter federal politics, and was initially replaced by George Throssell. Throssell's government was short-lived, however, and he was replaced as premier by Leake, who also appointed himself attorney-general.

Leake's first government lasted five months before being defeated on a no-confidence motion. Alf Morgans was appointed as his successor, but was unable to form a government, resulting in Leake being recommissioned as premier after just a month out of office. Leake's second government lasted until his sudden death from pneumonia in June 1902, aged 45. He is the only Premier of Western Australia to have died in office.

== Early life and background ==
George Leake was born on 3 December 1856, in Perth in what was then the British colony of Western Australia. The Leake family was prominent in the development of Perth and Western Australia; his father George Walpole Leake (1825–1895) was a barrister and politician, his uncle Luke Samuel Leake (1828–1886) was the first Speaker of the Western Australian Legislative Council. Their uncle George Leake (1786–1849) had arrived in what was then the Swan River Colony in 1829, and settled as a merchant.

Young George was educated at the Church of England Collegiate School (now Hale School) and at St Peter's College in Adelaide. On 1 December 1876, George was on board the steamer SS Georgette when it sank off Margaret River. He had been on the ship travelling to St Peter's in Adelaide to undergo a law course. The following year he married Louisa Emily Burt, daughter of the late Chief Justice, Sir Archibald Burt. In 1883 he was appointed Crown Solicitor and Public Prosecutor. Leake also took a keen interest in the gold mining industry, and was a member of the syndicate that successfully sent Harry Anstey to find gold in the Yilgarn in 1887.

== Career ==
In September 1886, Leake was appointed acting Attorney-General, and was subsequently nominated to the colony's Legislative Council. He remained in the position until December. On 28 November 1890, Leake was elected unopposed to the Legislative Assembly seat of Roebourne. He was offered a position in John Forrest's ministry, but declined, and resigned shortly afterwards on 30 December 1890 to avoid forfeiting his position as Crown Solicitor. He became a Queen's Counsel in 1898.

On 23 June 1894, Leake was elected as Legislative Assembly member for Albany. He was an enthusiastic proponent of federation and was president of the Federation League. In 1897 he was chosen as a Western Australian delegate to the Federal Convention, and attended meetings in Adelaide, Sydney and Melbourne.

On 2 August 1900, Leake resigned his seat for business reasons, and travelled to Europe. After he returned, he was elected to the Legislative Assembly as member for West Perth on 24 April 1901. No group won clear support in that election, and the incumbent premier George Throssell resigned office before parliament met, rather than test his support. Leader of the Opposition Frederick Illingworth was then invited to form a government, but could not do so because Leake refused to serve under him and some other members refused to serve without Leake. Eventually it was agreed that Leake would become premier, and Illingworth would be treasurer and colonial secretary. Leake became Premier and Attorney-General on 27 May. Although he had been an ardent Federationist, as Premier he vehemently repudiated the tariff policy planned by the new Commonwealth: "the tariff that had been placed before them by the Federal Ministry was ... an all round protectionist tarff ... Victoria under the circumstances of the Federal tariff would be able to trade where she liked in Australia, while all the states would only be able to trade with Victoria".

Leake's government did not have the support of the majority of parliament, but it was allowed to govern for five months until finally being defeated in November. Alf Morgans then formed a government, but in the subsequent ministerial by-election, supporters of Leake stood against Morgans' new cabinet, and three of the six new ministers were defeated. Morgans then resigned and Leake returned as Premier and Attorney-General on 23 December 1901, this time with much clearer support.

== Last days and death ==
In June 1902, Leake caught pneumonia. He died on 24 June 1902, to date the only Western Australian premier to die in office. Two days later it was announced in The Times that King Edward VII had intended to make him a Companion of the Order of St Michael and St George (CMG), and the award was made posthumously.

== Footnotes ==
Preceded by George Throssell	Premier of Western Australia; 1901	Succeeded by Alf Morgans
Preceded by Alf Morgans	Premier of Western Australia; 1901–1902	Succeeded by Walter James
