= Electoral results for the district of South Fremantle =

Western Australian district election results

This is a list of electoral results for the Electoral district of South Fremantle in Western Australian state elections.

== Members for South Fremantle ==
Member	Party	Term
David Symon	Non-aligned	1890–1892
Elias Solomon	Independent	1892–1901
Arthur Diamond	Independent	1901–1904
Arthur Diamond	Ministerial	1904–1906
Arthur Davies	Ministerial	1906–1911
Harry Bolton	Labor	1911–1917
Harry Bolton	National Labor	1917
Samuel Rocke	Ind. Labor	1917–1921
Alick McCallum	Labor	1922–1935
Thomas Fox	Labor	1935–1951
Dick Lawrence	Labor	1951–1960
Henry Curran	Labor	1960–1962

== Election results ==
=== Elections in the 1960s ===
1960 South Fremantle state by-election
Party	Candidate	Votes	%	±%
Labor	Henry Curran	5,266	52.5	−35.0
Independent Labor	William Hughes	4,767	47.5	+47.5
Total formal votes		10,033	96.5	+5.9
Informal votes		359	3.5	−5.9
Turnout		10,392	88.7	−1.1
Labor hold		Swing	N/A	

=== Elections in the 1950s ===
1959 Western Australian state election: South Fremantle
Party	Candidate	Votes	%	±%
Labor	Dick Lawrence	8,186	87.5	+11.2
Communist	George Kendrick	1,173	12.5	+12.5
Total formal votes		9,359	90.6	−5.6
Informal votes		973	9.4	+5.6
Turnout		10,332	89.8	−0.6
Labor hold		Swing	N/A	

1956 Western Australian state election: South Fremantle
Party	Candidate	Votes	%	±%
Labor	Dick Lawrence	7,042	76.3	
Independent Labor	Michael Robson	2,191	23.7	
Total formal votes		9,233	96.2	
Informal votes		369	3.8	
Turnout		9,602	90.4	
Labor hold		Swing		

1953 Western Australian state election: South Fremantle
Party	Candidate	Votes	%	±%
Labor	Dick Lawrence	unopposed		
Labor hold		Swing		

1951 South Fremantle state by-election
Party	Candidate	Votes	%	±%
Labor	Dick Lawrence	4,631	61.5	N/A
All Parties Association	Carlyle Ferguson	1,391	18.5	+18.5
Independent	Henry Miller	1,144	15.2	+15.2
Communist	Paddy Troy	365	4.9	+4.9
Total formal votes		7,531	97.6	
Informal votes		185	2.4	
Turnout		7,716	84.2	
Labor hold		Swing	N/A	

- Preferences were not distributed.

1950 Western Australian state election: South Fremantle
Party	Candidate	Votes	%	±%
Labor	Thomas Fox	unopposed		
Labor hold		Swing		

=== Elections in the 1940s ===
1947 Western Australian state election: South Fremantle
Party	Candidate	Votes	%	±%
Labor	Thomas Fox	unopposed		
Labor hold		Swing		

1943 Western Australian state election: South Fremantle
Party	Candidate	Votes	%	±%
Labor	Tom Fox	unopposed		
Labor hold		Swing		

=== Elections in the 1930s ===
1939 Western Australian state election: South Fremantle
Party	Candidate	Votes	%	±%
Labor	Thomas Fox	4,425	62.4	−5.7
Nationalist	Ashbury Gartrell	2,065	29.1	+29.1
Independent	Arthur Ambrose	605	8.5	+8.5
Total formal votes		7,095	97.4	−1.5
Informal votes		189	2.6	+1.5
Turnout		7,284	95.9	+35.8
Labor hold		Swing	N/A	

1936 Western Australian state election: South Fremantle
Party	Candidate	Votes	%	±%
Labor	Thomas Fox	2,955	68.1	−10.4
Social Credit	David Byers	1,385	31.9	+31.9
Total formal votes		4,340	98.9	+2.1
Informal votes		49	1.1	−2.1
Turnout		4,389	60.1	−34.6
Labor hold		Swing	N/A	

1935 South Fremantle state election
Party	Candidate	Votes	%	±%
Labor	Thomas Fox	2,282	59.6	−18.9
Nationalist	Alexander Bracks	1,544	40.4	+40.4
Total formal votes		3,826	98.8	+2.0
Informal votes		47	1.2	−2.0
Turnout		3,873	53.8	−40.9
Labor hold		Swing	N/A	

1933 Western Australian state election: South Fremantle
Party	Candidate	Votes	%	±%
Labor	Alick McCallum	5,384	78.5	−21.5
Ind. Nationalist	Joshua Warner	1,305	19.0	+19.0
Communist	Gregory Collins	168	2.5	+2.5
Total formal votes		6,857	96.8	
Informal votes		224	3.2	
Turnout		7,081	94.7	
Labor hold		Swing	N/A	

- Preferences were not distributed.

1930 Western Australian state election: South Fremantle
Party	Candidate	Votes	%	±%
Labor	Alick McCallum	unopposed		
Labor hold		Swing		

=== Elections in the 1920s ===
1927 Western Australian state election: South Fremantle
Party	Candidate	Votes	%	±%
Labor	Alick McCallum	3,028	78.9	−21.1
Nationalist	Philip Jane	812	21.1	+21.1
Total formal votes		3,840	98.9	
Informal votes		42	1.1	
Turnout		3,882	76.9	
Labor hold		Swing	N/A	

1924 Western Australian state election: South Fremantle
Party	Candidate	Votes	%	±%
Labor	Alick McCallum	unopposed		
Labor hold		Swing		

1921 Western Australian state election: South Fremantle
Party	Candidate	Votes	%	±%
Labor	Alick McCallum	1,741	48.3	+48.3
Nationalist	William Watson	1,531	42.5	+42.5
Independent Labor	Samuel Rocke	332	9.2	–40.9
Total formal votes		3,604	97.9	–0.6
Informal votes		78	2.1	+0.6
Turnout		3,682	78.9	+13.6
Two-party-preferred result
Labor	Alick McCallum	1,849	51.3	+51.3
Nationalist	William Watson	1,755	48.7	+48.7
Labor gain from Independent Labor		Swing	N/A	

=== Elections in the 1910s ===
1917 Western Australian state election: South Fremantle
Party	Candidate	Votes	%	±%
Independent Labor	Samuel Rocke	1,481	50.1	+50.1
National Labor	Harry Bolton	1,475	49.9	–5.9
Total formal votes		2,956	98.5	–1.1
Informal votes		45	1.5	+1.1
Turnout		3,001	65.3	–0.3
Independent Labor gain from National Labor		Swing	+50.1	

1914 Western Australian state election: South Fremantle
Party	Candidate	Votes	%	±%
Labor	Harry Bolton	2,018	55.8	−11.0
Liberal	William Watson	1,600	44.2	+14.8
Total formal votes		3,618	99.6	+0.8
Informal votes		16	0.4	−0.8
Turnout		3,634	65.6	−17.7
Labor hold		Swing	N/A	

1911 Western Australian state election: South Fremantle
Party	Candidate	Votes	%	±%
Labor	Harry Bolton	2,113	66.8	
Ministerialist	John Cooke	929	29.4	
Ministerialist	John Brennan	121	3.8	
Total formal votes		3,163	98.8	
Informal votes		38	1.2	
Turnout		3,201	83.3	
Labor gain from Ministerialist		Swing		

- Preferences were not distributed.

=== Elections in the 1900s ===
1908 Western Australian state election: South Fremantle
Party	Candidate	Votes	%	±%
Ministerialist	Arthur Davies	unopposed		
Ministerialist hold		Swing		

1906 South Fremantle state by-election
Party	Candidate	Votes	%	±%
Ministerialist	Arthur Davies	1,509	66.9	+10.9
Labour	Joseph Dale	748	33.1	−10.9
Total formal votes		2,257	98.6	−0.2
Informal votes		33	1.4	+0.2
Turnout		2,290	51.5	+0.1
Ministerialist hold		Swing	+10.9	

1905 Western Australian state election: South Fremantle
Party	Candidate	Votes	%	±%
Ministerialist	Arthur Diamond	1,116	56.0	–2.5
Labour	Alick McCallum	878	44.0	+2.5
Total formal votes		1,994	98.8	–0.6
Informal votes		24	1.2	+0.6
Turnout		2,018	51.4	+12.2
Ministerialist hold		Swing	–2.5	

1904 Western Australian state election: South Fremantle
Party	Candidate	Votes	%	±%
Ministerialist	Arthur Diamond	1,357	58.5	+21.6
Labour	Edward Gilleland	964	41.5	+11.8
Total formal votes		2,321	99.4	+0.7
Informal votes		15	0.6	–0.7
Turnout		2,336	39.2	–1.7
Ministerialist hold		Swing	+21.6	

1901 Western Australian state election: South Fremantle
Party	Candidate	Votes	%	±%
Independent	Arthur Diamond	492	36.9	+36.9
Labour	William Guilfoyle	396	29.7	+29.7
Independent	William Forsythe	296	22.2	+22.2
Opposition	Walter Mortess	151	11.3	+11.3
Total formal votes		1,335	98.7	n/a
Informal votes		17	1.3	n/a
Turnout		1,352	40.9	n/a
Independent hold		Swing	N/A	

=== Elections in the 1890s ===
1897 Western Australian colonial election: South Fremantle
Party	Candidate	Votes	%	±%
Independent	Elias Solomon	unopposed		
Independent hold		Swing		

1894 Western Australian colonial election: South Fremantle
Party	Candidate	Votes	%	±%
None	Elias Solomon	unopposed		

1892 South Fremantle colonial by-election
Party	Candidate	Votes	%	±%
None	Elias Solomon	161	51.1	
None	William Wray	154	48.9	

1890 Western Australian colonial election: South Fremantle
Party	Candidate	Votes	%	±%
None	David Symon	203	57.8	n/a
None	Daniel Congdon	148	42.2	n/a
