= List of Western Australian state by-elections =

The list of Western Australia state by-elections includes every by-election held in the Australian state of Western Australia. By-elections occur whenever there is a vacancy in the Legislative Assembly (or, historically, the Legislative Council), although an imminent state election may allow the vacancy to remain until the dissolution of parliament.

Section 67 of the Electoral Act 1907 requires the Speaker to issue a writ for a by-election to fill the vacancy. This can either take place after a resolution of the House if Parliament is in session, or simply upon the cause being established by the Speaker acting alone if the Parliament is in adjournment for more than seven days.

== Causes ==
A by-election occurs whenever there is a vacancy in the Legislative Assembly. Vacancies can occur for the following reasons, according to Section 38 of the Constitution Acts Amendment Act 1899.

The member:

- Is no longer eligible to sit—for example, leaving the State. This historically occurred more frequently when times were less economically stable, and people would move to another state or country where they could work or conduct business.
- Has been convicted for an offence for which the penalty was imprisonment for life, or for more than five years (Section 32). This last happened to John Marquis Hopkins when he was convicted for fraud in 1910, necessitating a by-election in his seat of Beverley.
- Becomes an undischarged bankrupt. This last happened in 1936 when Independent candidate Thomas Hughes won East Perth against the incumbent member in the 1936 election. However it was found that he was an undischarged bankrupt at the time of the nomination and poll (although had since resolved his affairs), and the election was declared void. He won the resulting by-election.
- Is elected to either the Federal Parliament or the parliament of another state or territory (Section 34). In practice, this is never necessary, as the other Parliament usually requires resignation from the Western Australian parliament in order to nominate as a candidate. This last occurred in the Legislative Assembly in 2001 when Hendy Cowan, the member for Merredin, resigned to unsuccessfully contest a seat in the Australian Senate.
- Is appointed as a judge or magistrate in a Western Australian court or as a chairman (or in some cases member) of another state board or tribunal (Section 34). This provision has never been acted upon, although numerous members have resigned over time to take up such an appointment—for example, Ron Davies resigned in Victoria Park in 1986 to become Agent-General for Western Australia in London, whilst Deputy Premier Herb Graham resigned in Balcatta in 1973 to become chairman of the Licensing Board.
- "Holds an office or place in the service of the Crown" at the time at which they take up their seat (Section 36-37). This has never been used at state level, although it has occurred in other States and in the Federal Parliament (for example, the circumstances leading to the federal Lindsay by-election in 1996.)
- Becomes "of unsound mind".
- Pledges allegiance to a foreign power after their election. This does not apply to members who are already dual citizens at the time of their election, unlike the equivalent section in the Federal Constitution.
- Fails to attend the House for one entire session without the permission of the House. The last time this caused a by-election was in 1915 when Joseph Gardiner, the Labor member for Roebourne, disappeared, necessitating a by-election in which an Opposition candidate was victorious, wiping out the Government's one-seat majority.

Additional reasons not within Section 38 include death, resignation, or the voiding of results by a Court of Disputed Returns. The last time a by-election took place for this reason was in 1983, when Gavan Troy, the Labor candidate, narrowly defeated incumbent Liberal member Tom Herzfeld in Mundaring. The seat was won by Troy by a larger margin at the resulting by-election.

=== Ministerial by-elections ===
Until a constitutional amendment in 1947, it was necessary for members who were appointed as a minister to resign their seat and contest their seat at a ministerial by-election. This was because the ministers became members of the executive council, which reported to the governor of Western Australia and was therefore deemed an "office of profit" under the Crown. Most ministerial by-elections were a formality with the minister being re-elected unopposed, but on two occasions, in 1901 and 1917, ministers were defeated at the by-elections, in the former case directly causing the fall of the Morgans Ministry.

== List of Legislative Assembly by-elections ==
=== 42nd Parliament (2025-present) ===
Parl.	By-election	Date	Incumbent	Party	Winner	Party	Vacated	Cause	Retained
42nd	Secret Harbour	29 August 2026	Paul Papalia	Labor	Luke Herdegen	One Nation	7 July 2026	Resignation	No
=== 41st Parliament (2021-2025) ===
Parl.	By-election	Date	Incumbent	Party	Winner	Party	Vacated	Cause	Retained
41st	Rockingham	29 July 2023	Mark McGowan	Labor	Magenta Marshall	Labor	8 June 2023	Resignation	Yes
41st	North West Central	17 September 2022	Vince Catania	National	Merome Beard	National	8 August 2022	Resignation	Yes
=== 40th Parliament (2017-2021) ===
Parl.	By-election	Date	Incumbent	Party	Winner	Party	Vacated	Cause	Retained
40th	Darling Range	23 June 2018	Barry Urban	Independent	Alyssa Hayden	Liberal	8 May 2018	Resignation	No
40th	Cottesloe	17 March 2018	Colin Barnett	Liberal	David Honey	Liberal	5 February 2018	Resignation	Yes
=== 39th Parliament (2013-2017) ===
Parl.	By-election	Date	Incumbent	Party	Winner	Party	Vacated	Cause	Retained
39th	Vasse	18 October 2014	Troy Buswell	Liberal	Libby Mettam	Liberal	3 September 2014	Resignation	Yes
=== 38th Parliament (2008-2013) ===
Parl.	By-election	Date	Incumbent	Party	Winner	Party	Vacated	Cause	Retained
38th	Armadale	2 October 2010	Alannah MacTiernan	Labor	Tony Buti	Labor	19 July 2010	Resignation (Contesting HoR)	Yes
38th	Willagee	28 November 2009	Alan Carpenter	Labor	Peter Tinley	Labor	2 October 2009	Resignation	Yes
38th	Fremantle	16 May 2009	Jim McGinty	Labor	Adele Carles	Greens	3 April 2009	Resignation	No
=== 37th Parliament (2005-2008) ===
Parl.	By-election	Date	Incumbent	Party	Winner	Party	Vacated	Cause	Retained
37th	Murdoch	23 February 2008	Trevor Sprigg	Liberal	Christian Porter	Liberal	17 January 2008	Death	Yes
37th	Peel	3 February 2007	Norm Marlborough	Labor	Paul Papalia	Labor	10 November 2006	Resignation	Yes
37th	Victoria Park	11 March 2006	Dr Geoff Gallop	Labor	Ben Wyatt	Labor	16 January 2006	Resignation	Yes
=== 36th Parliament (2001-2005) ===
Parl.	By-election	Date	Incumbent	Party	Winner	Party	Vacated	Cause	Retained
36th	Merredin	24 November 2001	Hendy Cowan	National	Brendon Grylls	National	17 October 2001	Resignation (contesting Senate)	Yes
36th	Nedlands	9 June 2001	Richard Court	Liberal	Sue Walker	Liberal	23 February 2001	Resignation	Yes
=== 35th Parliament (1996-2001) ===
No by-elections held
=== 34th Parliament (1993-1996) ===
Parl.	By-election	Date	Incumbent	Party	Winner	Party	Vacated	Cause	Retained
34th	Kalgoorlie	16 March 1996	Ian Taylor	Labor	Megan Anwyl	Labor	4 February 1996	Resignation (contesting HoR)	Yes
34th	Helena	10 September 1994	Gordon Hill	Labor	Rhonda Parker	Liberal	4 August 1994	Resignation	No
34th	Glendalough	19 March 1994	Dr Carmen Lawrence	Labor	Michelle Roberts	Labor	14 February 1994	Resignation (contesting HoR)	Yes
=== 33rd Parliament (1989-1993) ===
Parl.	By-election	Date	Incumbent	Party	Winner	Party	Vacated	Cause	Retained
33rd	Ashburton	4 April 1992	Pam Buchanan	Independent	Fred Riebeling	Labor	3 March 1992	Resignation (ill health)	Yes (Note: The Independent member for Ashburton, Pam Buchanan, was elected at the 1989 state election as a member of the Labor Party, but resigned on 1 February 1991 to sit as an Independent. As such, the 1992 by-election is noted as a retain for Labor.)
33rd	Floreat	20 July 1991	Andrew Mensaros	Liberal	Liz Constable	Independent	May 1991	Resignation (ill health)	No
33rd	Geraldton	13 April 1991	Jeff Carr	Labor	Bob Bloffwitch	Liberal	28 February 1991	Resignation	No
33rd	Cottesloe	11 August 1990	Bill Hassell	Liberal	Colin Barnett	Liberal	28 June 1990	Resignation	Yes
33rd	Maylands	26 May 1990	Peter Dowding	Labor	Judy Edwards	Labor	26 April 1990	Resignation	Yes
33rd	Fremantle	26 May 1990	David Parker	Labor	Jim McGinty	Labor	26 April 1990	Resignation	Yes
=== 32nd Parliament (1986-1989) ===
Parl.	By-election	Date	Incumbent	Party	Winner	Party	Vacated	Cause	Retained
32nd	Dale	7 May 1988	Cyril Rushton	Liberal	Fred Tubby	Liberal	25 February 1988	Resignation	Yes
32nd	Ascot	19 March 1988	Mal Bryce	Labor	Eric Ripper	Labor	17 February 1988	Resignation	Yes
32nd	Balga	19 March 1988	Brian Burke	Labor	Ted Cunningham	Labor	17 February 1988	Resignation	Yes
32nd	Darling Range	24 October 1987	George Spriggs	Liberal	Bob Greig	Liberal	3 September 1987	Resignation	Yes
32nd	Gascoyne	24 October 1987	Ian Laurance	Liberal	Dudley Maslen	Liberal	3 September 1987	Resignation	Yes
32nd	Morley-Swan	9 May 1987	Arthur Tonkin	Labor	Frank Donovan	Labor	18 March 1987	Resignation	Yes
32nd	Narrogin	9 May 1987	Cambell Nalder	National	Bob Wiese	National	14 March 1987	Death	Yes
32nd	Perth	9 May 1987	Terry Burke	Labor	Dr Ian Alexander	Labor	18 March 1987	Resignation	Yes
32nd	Cockburn	7 June 1986	Clive Hughes	Labor	Norm Marlborough	Labor	4 April 1986	Death	Yes
32nd	Victoria Park	7 June 1986	Ron Davies	Labor	Dr Geoff Gallop	Labor	16 April 1986	Resignation (appointed as Agent-General)	Yes
=== 31st Parliament (1983-1986) ===
Parl.	By-election	Date	Incumbent	Party	Winner	Party	Vacated	Cause	Retained
31st	Cockburn	17 November 1984	Don Taylor	Labor	Clive Hughes	Labor	31 August 1984	Resignation	Yes
31st	Mount Lawley	17 November 1984	Ray O'Connor	Liberal	George Cash	Liberal	17 August 1984	Resignation	Yes
31st	Mundaring	8 October 1983	Gavan Troy	Labor	Gavan Troy	Labor	2 September 1983	Voided by Court of Disputed Returns	Yes
=== 30th Parliament (1980-1983) ===
Parl.	By-election	Date	Incumbent	Party	Winner	Party	Vacated	Cause	Retained
30th	Nedlands	13 March 1982	Sir Charles Court	Liberal	Richard Court	Liberal	31 January 1982	Resignation	Yes
30th	Swan	13 March 1982	Jack Skidmore	Labor	Gordon Hill	Labor	31 January 1982	Resignation	Yes
30th	Kalgoorlie	20 June 1981	Ted Evans	Labor	Ian Taylor	Labor	30 April 1981	Death	Yes
=== 29th Parliament (1977-1980) ===
Parl.	By-election	Date	Incumbent	Party	Winner	Party	Vacated	Cause	Retained
29th	Kimberley	17 December 1977	Alan Ridge	Liberal	Alan Ridge	Liberal	7 November 1977	Voided by Court of Disputed Returns	Yes
=== 28th Parliament (1974-1977) ===
Parl.	By-election	Date	Incumbent	Party	Winner	Party	Vacated	Cause	Retained
28th	Greenough	1 November 1975	Sir David Brand	Liberal	Reg Tubby	Liberal	21 August 1975	Resignation	Yes
=== 27th Parliament (1971-1974) ===
Parl.	By-election	Date	Incumbent	Party	Winner	Party	Vacated	Cause	Retained
27th	Balcatta	28 July 1973	Herb Graham	Labor	Brian Burke	Labor	30 May 1973	Resignation (appointed to Licensing Court)	Yes
27th	Bunbury	7 April 1973	Maurice Williams	Liberal	John Sibson	Liberal	28 February 1973	Resignation	Yes
27th	Blackwood	16 December 1972	David Reid	Country	Sandy Lewis	Liberal	26 October 1972	Resignation (contesting HoR)	No
27th	Ascot	13 November 1971	Merv Toms	Labor	Mal Bryce	Labor	8 October 1971	Death	Yes
=== 26th Parliament (1968-1971) ===
Parl.	By-election	Date	Incumbent	Party	Winner	Party	Vacated	Cause	Retained
26th	Albany	6 June 1970	Jack Hall	Labor	Wyndham Cook	Labor	14 April 1970	Resignation	Yes
=== 25th Parliament (1965-1968) ===
Parl.	By-election	Date	Incumbent	Party	Winner	Party	Vacated	Cause	Retained
25th	Mount Marshall	2 September 1967	George Cornell	Country	Ray McPharlin	Country	6 July 1967	Death	Yes
25th	Roe	2 September 1967	Tom Hart	Country	Bill Young	Country	30 June 1967	Resignation	Yes
25th	Dale	8 May 1965	Gerald Wild	Liberal	Cyril Rushton	Liberal	16 March 1965	Resignation (appointed as Agent-General)	Yes
=== 24th Parliament (1962-1965) ===
Parl.	By-election	Date	Incumbent	Party	Winner	Party	Vacated	Cause	Retained
24th	Bunbury	1 September 1962	George Roberts	Liberal	Maurice Williams	Liberal	22 July 1962	Death	Yes
24th	Darling Range	21 July 1962	Ken Dunn	Liberal	Ken Dunn	Liberal	22 June 1962	Voided by Court of Disputed Returns	Yes
24th	Murray	23 June 1962	Sir Ross McLarty	Liberal	Ewart Runciman	Liberal	7 May 1962	Resignation	Yes
=== 23rd Parliament (1959-1962) ===
Parl.	By-election	Date	Incumbent	Party	Winner	Party	Vacated	Cause	Retained
23rd	Victoria Park	26 August 1961	Hugh Andrew	Labor	Ron Davies	Labor	1 July 1961	Death	Yes
23rd	South Fremantle	12 March 1960	Dick Lawrence	Labor	Henry Curran	Labor	25 January 1960	Death	Yes
=== 22nd Parliament (1956-1959) ===
Parl.	By-election	Date	Incumbent	Party	Winner	Party	Vacated	Cause	Retained
22nd	Moore	20 September 1958	John Ackland	Country	Edgar Lewis	Country	29 July 1958	Death	Yes
22nd	Pilbara	24 April 1958 (Note: Won by acclamation; this date is the date of the return of the writ.)	Aloysius Rodoreda	Labor	Arthur Bickerton	Labor	11 March 1958	Death	Yes
22nd	Warren	25 January 1958	Ernest Hoar	Labor	Joseph Rowberry	Labor	17 December 1957	Resignation (appointed as Agent-General)	Yes
=== 21st Parliament (1953-1956) ===
Parl.	By-election	Date	Incumbent	Party	Winner	Party	Vacated	Cause	Retained
21st	Bunbury	29 October 1955	Frank Guthrie	Labor	George Roberts	Liberal	21 September 1955	Death	No
21st	Kimberley	16 May 1953	Aubrey Coverley	Labor	John Rhatigan	Labor	19 March 1953	Death	Yes
=== 20th Parliament (1950-1953) ===
Parl.	By-election	Date	Incumbent	Party	Winner	Party	Vacated	Cause	Retained
20th	Murchison	8 November 1952	William Marshall	Labor	Everard O'Brien	Labor	19 August 1952	Death	Yes
20th	Leederville	9 February 1952	Alexander Panton	Labor	Ted Johnson	Labor	25 December 1951	Death	Yes
20th	Gascoyne	13 October 1951	Frank Wise	Labor	Noel Butcher	Ind. Lib.	9 July 1951	Resignation (appointed as NT Administrator)	No
20th	Boulder	14 September 1951	Charlie Oliver	Labor	Arthur Moir	Labor	16 August 1951	Death	Yes
20th	South Fremantle	14 July 1951	Tom Fox	Labor	Dick Lawrence	Labor	20 April 1951	Death	Yes
20th	Maylands	17 February 1951	Harry Shearn	Independent	Edward Oldfield	Liberal	25 January 1951	Death	No
=== 19th Parliament (1947-1950) ===
Parl.	By-election	Date	Incumbent	Party	Winner	Party	Vacated	Cause	Retained
19th	Hannans	26 February 1949	David Leahy	Labor	Harry McCulloch	Labor	19 December 1948	Death	Yes
19th	Boulder	4 December 1948	Hon Philip Collier	Labor	Charlie Oliver	Labor	18 October 1948	Death	Yes
19th	Guildford-Midland	13 March 1948	William Johnson	Labor	John Brady	Labor	26 January 1948	Death	Yes
19th	Sussex	7 June 1947	William Willmott	Liberal	Stewart Bovell	Liberal	2 May 1947	Death	Yes
19th	Pilbara	2 August 1947	Bill Hegney	Labor	Bill Hegney	Labor	20 June 1947	Voided by petition	Yes
=== 18th Parliament (1943-1947) ===
Parl.	By-election	Date	Incumbent	Party	Winner	Party	Vacated	Cause	Retained
18th	Greenough	27 October 1945	John Newton	Labor	David Brand	Liberal	27 September 1945 (Note: At the 1943 election, the Labor candidate for Greenough, John Newton, a farmer from Mingenew who had enlisted in the RAAF as a Flight Lieutenant in 1941 and left for the United Kingdom in 1942, unexpectedly defeated the sitting Country member, William Patrick. On 14 January 1944, he was reported missing after a raid on Germany. On 31 July 1945, a panel of members was appointed to enquire whether a vacancy existed, and on 27 September 1945, the seat was declared vacant. At the resulting by-election on 27 October 1945, Liberal candidate David Brand was successful, becoming the first person to win an Australian election under the new Liberal banner.)	Death (WWII combat)	No
18th	Victoria Park	10 February 1945	Howard Raphael	Labor	William Read	Independent	9 December 1944	Death	No
18th	Avon	1 July 1944	William Telfer	Labor	William Telfer	Labor	24 May 1944	Voided by Court of Disputed Returns	Yes
18th	Swan	29 April 1944	Richard Sampson	Country	Ray Owen	Ind. Country	16 February 1944	Death	No
=== 17th Parliament (1939-1943) ===
Parl.	By-election	Date	Incumbent	Party	Winner	Party	Vacated	Cause	Retained
17th	East Perth	14 August 1943	Thomas Hughes	Independent	Herb Graham	Labor	15 July 1943	Resignation (contesting HoR)	No
17th	York	21 November 1942	Charles Latham	Country	Charles Perkins	Country	7 October 1942	Resignation (appointed to Senate)	Yes
17th	Yilgarn-Coolgardie	9 August 1941	George Lambert	Labor	Lionel Kelly	Ind. Country	30 June 1941	Death	No
17th	Irwin-Moore	9 September 1939	Claude Barker	Independent	Horace Berry	Independent	2 August 1939	Resignation	Yes
17th	Forrest	20 May 1939	May Holman	Labor	Edward Holman	Labor	20 March 1939	Death (car accident)	Yes
=== 16th Parliament (1936-1939) ===
Parl.	By-election	Date	Incumbent	Party	Winner	Party	Vacated	Cause	Retained
16th	Hannans	5 May 1938	Selby Munsie	Labor	David Leahy	Labor	12 March 1938	Death	Yes
16th	Sussex	12 February 1938	Edmund Brockman	Nationalist	William Willmott	Nationalist	4 January 1938	Death	Yes
16th	East Perth	9 May 1936	Thomas Hughes	Independent	Thomas Hughes	Independent	18 April 1936	Resignation	Yes
=== 15th Parliament (1933-1936) ===
Parl.	By-election	Date	Incumbent	Party	Winner	Party	Vacated	Cause	Retained
15th	Katanning	31 August 1935	Arnold Piesse	Country	Arthur Watts	Country	21 July 1935	Death	Yes
15th	Avon	4 July 1935	Harry Griffiths	Country	Ignatius Boyle	Country	23 March 1935	Death	Yes
15th	South Fremantle	4 July 1935	Alick McCallum	Labor	Tom Fox	Labor	16 March 1935	Resignation	Yes
15th	Kimberley	29 July 1933	Aubrey Coverley	Labor	Aubrey Coverley	Labor	3 July 1933	Voided by Court of Disputed Returns	Yes
=== 14th Parliament (1930-1933) ===
Parl.	By-election	Date	Incumbent	Party	Winner	Party	Vacated	Cause	Retained
14th	Brown Hill-Ivanhoe	14 July 1932	John Lutey	Labor	Frederick Smith	Labor	22 June 1932	Death	Yes
14th	Kanowna	25 June 1932	Thomas Walker	Labor	Emil Nulsen	Labor	10 May 1932	Death	Yes
14th	Roebourne	6 February 1932	Frederick Teesdale	Nationalist	John Church	Nationalist	14 December 1931	Death	Yes
=== 13th Parliament (1927-1930) ===
Parl.	By-election	Date	Incumbent	Party	Winner	Party	Vacated	Cause	Retained
13th	Irwin	19 November 1929	Charles Maley	Country	Henry Maley	Country	15 October 1929	Death	Yes
13th	Mount Leonora	7 November 1928	Thomas Heron	Labor	Ernest Cowan	Labor	13 October 1928	Death	Yes
13th	Williams-Narrogin	3 November 1928	Bertie Johnston	Country	Victor Doney	Country	3 October 1928	Resignation (contesting Senate)	Yes
=== 12th Parliament (1924-1927) ===
Parl.	By-election	Date	Incumbent	Party	Winner	Party	Vacated	Cause	Retained
12th	Forrest	3 April 1925	John Holman	Labor	May Holman	Labor	23 February 1925	Death	Yes
=== 11th Parliament (1921-1924) ===
Parl.	By-election	Date	Incumbent	Party	Winner	Party	Vacated	Cause	Retained
11th	Forrest	8 December 1923	Peter O'Loghlen	Labor	John Holman	Labor	12 November 1923	Death	Yes
11th	Kalgoorlie	13 January 1923	John Boyland	Independent	James Cunningham	Labor	14 December 1922	Death	No
11th	East Perth	18 November 1922	Jack Simons	Nationalist (Note: Simons had been elected as a Labor member in the 1921 state election, but had resigned to sit as an independent and subsequently joined the Nationalist Party. He was a candidate in the by-election, but was defeated.)	Thomas Hughes	Labor	1 November 1922	Resignation	No
=== 10th Parliament (1917-1921) ===
Parl.	By-election	Date	Incumbent	Party	Winner	Party	Vacated	Cause	Retained
10th	Mount Leonora	20 December 1920	George Foley	National Labor	Thomas Heron	Labor	18 November 1920	Resignation (contesting HoR)	No
10th	Albany	31 May 1919	Herbert Robinson	Nationalist	John Scaddan	National Labor	2 May 1919	Death	No
10th	Claremont	14 September 1918	John Stewart	Nationalist	Thomas Duff	Nationalist	30 August 1918	Resignation	Yes
10th	Subiaco	10 November 1917	Bartholomew Stubbs	Labor	Samuel Brown	Nationalist	26 September 1917	Death (WWI combat)	No
=== 9th Parliament (1914-1917) ===
Parl.	By-election	Date	Incumbent	Party	Winner	Party	Vacated	Cause	Retained
9th	Perth	21 July 1917	Sir James Connolly	Nationalist	Robert Pilkington	Nationalist	June 1917	Resignation	Yes
9th	Brown Hill-Ivanhoe	21 July 1917	John Scaddan^{[4]}	National Labor	John Lutey	Labor	28 June 1917	Ministerial by-election	No
9th	Geraldton	14 April 1917	Edward Heitmann	National Labor	Samuel Elliott	Liberal	20 March 1917	Resignation (contesting HoR)	No
9th	Brown Hill-Ivanhoe	7 October 1916	John Lutey^{[4]}	Labor	John Scaddan	Labor	15 September 1916	Resignation	Yes
9th	Brown Hill-Ivanhoe	19 August 1916	John Scaddan (Note: The Labor member for Brown Hill-Ivanhoe and former premier, John Scaddan, resigned from his seat on 8 August 1916 in order to contest the Canning ministerial by-election against new minister Robert Robinson. On 19 August 1916, Labor candidate John Lutey was elected unopposed to fill the vacancy. However, upon Scaddan's narrow loss in Canning, Lutey resigned from the seat on 15 September 1916 before being sworn in to allow Scaddan to regain his seat, which he did at the resulting by-election on 7 October 1916 against two minor-party candidates. In March 1917, Scaddan and several others left the Labor Party and joined the new National Labor Party. This party formed a coalition with the Nationalists who, under Premier Sir Henry Lefroy, formed a Ministry on 28 June 1917. Scaddan was appointed minister for railways, and had to contest a ministerial by-election. John Lutey won the seat at the by-election on 21 July 1917.)	Labor	John Lutey	Labor	8 August 1916	Resignation	Yes
9th	Coolgardie	15 August 1916	Charles McDowall	Labor	George Lambert	Labor	13 July 1916	Death	Yes
9th	Williams-Narrogin	9 January 1916	Bertie Johnston (Note: On 18 December 1915, the Labor member for Williams-Narrogin, Bertie Johnston, resigned from the Labor Party and from Parliament. He was returned unopposed as an Independent at the close of nominations for the resulting by-election on 9 January 1916. In mid-1917, he joined the Country Party.)	Independent	Bertie Johnston	Independent	18 December 1915	Resignation	Yes
9th	Roebourne	17 November 1915	Joseph Gardiner	Labor	William Butcher	Liberal	30 September 1915	Absence without leave	No
=== 8th Parliament (1911-1914) ===
Parl.	By-election	Date	Incumbent	Party	Winner	Party	Vacated	Cause	Retained
8th	Kalgoorlie	4 February 1914	Albert Green	Labor	George McLeod	Labor	8 December 1913	Resignation	Yes
8th	Geraldton	15 November 1913	Bronte Dooley	Labor	Samuel Elliott	Liberal	19 October 1913	Death	No
8th	Cue	12 November 1913	Edward Heitmann	Labor	Thomas Chesson	Labor	4 November 1913	Resignation	Yes
8th	Forrest	3 July 1913	Thomas Moore	Labor	Peter O'Loghlen	Labor	17 June 1913	Resignation	Yes
8th	Forrest	6 May 1913	Peter O'Loghlen	Labor	Thomas Moore	Labor	17 April 1913	Resignation (contesting HoR)	Yes
=== 7th Parliament (1908-1911) ===
Parl.	By-election	Date	Incumbent	Party	Winner	Party	Vacated	Cause	Retained
7th	Bunbury	1 March 1911	Sir Newton Moore	Ministerialist	William Thomas	Labor	13 February 1911	Resignation (appointed as Agent-General)	No
7th	Beverley	15 August 1910	John Hopkins	Ministerialist	Nat Harper	Ministerialist	28 July 1910	Disqualified (jailed for uttering)	Yes
7th	Forrest	8 July 1910	Dennis Jones	Labor	Peter O'Loghlen	Labor	20 June 1910	Resignation	Yes
7th	Gascoyne	28 June 1910	William Butcher	Ministerialist	William Butcher	Ministerialist	18 June 1910	Sold land to Crown	Yes
7th	Fremantle	9 June 1910	James Price	Ministerialist	William Murphy	Ministerialist	21 May 1910	Death	Yes
7th	Forrest	23 March 1910	Peter O'Loghlen	Labor	Dennis Jones	Labor	13 March 1910	Resignation (contesting HoR)	Yes
7th	Katanning	12 November 1909	Frederick Henry Piesse	Ministerialist	Arnold Piesse	Ministerialist	26 October 1909	Resignation	Yes
7th	Albany	17 September 1909	Edward Barnett	Ministerialist	William Price	Ministerialist	Aug/Sep 1909	Resignation	Yes
7th	Menzies	20 November 1908	Henry Gregory	Ministerialist	Henry Gregory	Ministerialist	4 November 1908	Voided by petition	Yes
=== 6th Parliament (1905-1908) ===
Parl.	By-election	Date	Incumbent	Party	Winner	Party	Vacated	Cause	Retained
6th	West Perth	2 September 1907	Frederick Illingworth	Ministerialist	Thomas Draper	NPL (Min.)	13 August 1907	Resignation	Yes
6th	Mount Leonora	13 November 1906	Patrick Lynch	Labor	Julian Stuart	Labor	2 November 1906	Resignation (contesting Senate)	Yes
6th	Geraldton	21 November 1906	Henry Carson	Ministerialist	Thomas Brown	Labor	26 October 1906	Voided by petition	No
6th	East Fremantle	13 November 1906	Joseph Holmes	Ministerialist	William Angwin	Labor	24 October 1906	Voided by petition	No
6th	Pilbara	23 July 1906	James Isdell	Independent	Henry Underwood	Labor	27 June 1906	Resignation	No
6th	Guildford	16 July 1906	Sir Cornthwaite Rason	Ministerialist	William Johnson	Labor	27 June 1906	Resignation (appointed as Agent-General)	No
6th	South Fremantle	16 July 1906	Arthur Diamond	Ministerialist	Arthur Davies	Ministerialist	22 June 1906	Death	Yes
6th	Coolgardie	9 July 1906	William Eddy	Ministerialist	William Eddy	Ministerialist	27 April 1906	Voided by petition	Yes
=== 5th Parliament (1904-1905) ===
Parl.	By-election	Date	Incumbent	Party	Winner	Party	Vacated	Cause	Retained
5th	East Perth	20 October 1904	Walter James	Ministerialist	John Hardwick	Ministerialist	4 October 1904	Resignation (appointed as Agent-General)	Yes
=== 4th Parliament (1901-1904) ===
Parl.	By-election	Date	Incumbent	Party	Winner	Party	Vacated	Cause	Retained
4th	Nelson	11 December 1903	Sir J. G. Lee-Steere	Ministerialist	John Walter	Ministerialist	30 November 1903	Death	Yes
4th	North Fremantle	26 August 1903	Denis Doherty	Ministerialist	John Ferguson	Ministerialist	13 August 1903	Resignation (left State)	Yes
4th	York	6 April 1903	Frederick Monger	Ministerialist	R. G. Burges	Ministerialist	24 March 1903	Resignation	Yes
4th	Pilbara	18 March 1903	Walter Kingsmill	Oppositionist	James Isdell	Independent	12 February 1903	Resignation	No
4th	Hannans	15 October 1902	John Reside	Labor	Thomas Bath	Labor	29 September 1902	Death	Yes
4th	Murray	16 July 1902	William George	Oppositionist	William Atkins	Independent	1 July 1902	Resignation	No
4th	West Perth	14 July 1902	George Leake	Oppositionist	Charles Moran	Independent	24 June 1902	Resignation	No
4th	Claremont	11 June 1902	William Sayer	Ministerialist	John Foulkes	Oppositionist	28 May 1902	Resignation	No
4th	North Perth	5 October 1901	Richard Speight	Oppositionist	George McWilliams	Oppositionist	19 September 1901	Resignation	Yes
4th	West Kimberley	23 July 1901	Alexander Forrest	Ministerialist	Sydney Pigott	Ministerialist	20 June 1901	Death	Yes
=== 3rd Parliament (1897-1901) ===
Parl.	By-election	Date	Incumbent	Party	Winner	Party	Vacated	Cause	Retained
3rd	Albany	24 July 1900	George Leake	Oppositionist	John Hassell	Oppositionist	10 July 1900	Resignation	Yes
3rd	Geraldton	24 July 1900	Richard Robson	Independent	Robert Hutchinson	Oppositionist	13 June 1900	Resignation	No
3rd	De Grey	28 May 1900	E. T. Hooley	Ministerialist	Leonard Darlot	Ministerialist	1 May 1900	Resignation (ill health)	Yes
3rd	Ashburton	24 April 1900	Septimus Burt	Ministerialist	David Forrest	Ministerialist	10 April 1900	Resignation	Yes
3rd	North Murchison	18 September 1899	Henry Kenny	Oppositionist	Frederick Moorhead	Ministerialist	25 August 1899	Death	No
3rd	Geraldton	12 July 1899	George Simpson	Oppositionist	Richard Robson	Independent	27 June 1899	Resignation	No
3rd	York	26 June 1899	Frederick Monger	Ministerialist	Frederick Monger	Ministerialist	15 June 1899	Resignation	Yes
3rd	Gascoyne	26 June 1899	George Hubble	Ministerialist	George Hubble	Ministerialist	13 June 1899	Resignation	Yes
=== 2nd Parliament (1894-1897) ===
Parl.	By-election	Date	Incumbent	Party	Winner	Party	Vacated	Cause	Retained
2nd	Fremantle	18 July 1896	William Marmion		John Higham		4 July 1896	Death	
2nd	North Fremantle	22 May 1895	William Silas Pearse		Matthew Moss		2 May 1895 (Note: This was the date which the writ was issued – the date of the event which caused the by-election is unknown.)	Resignation	
2nd	Murray	12 January 1895	William Paterson		William George		4 January 1895	Resignation	
2nd	Murchison	15 October 1894	Everard Darlot		E. T. Hooley		18 September 1894	Resignation	
=== 1st Parliament (1890-1894) ===
Parl.	By-election	Date	Incumbent	Party	Winner	Party	Vacated	Cause	Retained
1st	East Kimberley	20 April 1893	William Baker		Francis Connor		7 January 1893	Death	
1st	York	27 October 1892	Stephen Henry Parker		Frederick Monger		5 October 1892	Resignation	
1st	South Fremantle	12 October 1892	David Symon		Elias Solomon		13 September 1892	Resignation	
1st	Moore	11 August 1892	George Randell		Henry Lefroy		4 July 1892	Resignation	
1st	Perth	12 January 1892	Edward Scott		Thomas Molloy		22 December 1891	Resignation	
1st	Geraldton	10 December 1891	Edward Vivien Harvey Keane		George Simpson		6 November 1891	Resignation	
1st	Roebourne	16 January 1891	George Leake		Horace Sholl		30 December 1890	Resignation	

=== Ministerial by-elections ===
The following ministers had to resign their seats and recontest them at a ministerial by-election. Most were unopposed; these are noted in italics in the table.

Parl.	Electorate	Date	Member	Party	Winner	Party	Appointed	Ministry	Retained
19th	Murray-Wellington	17 April 1947	Ross McLarty	Liberal			1 April 1947	McLarty-Watts	Yes
19th	Katanning	17 April 1947	Arthur Watts	Country			1 April 1947	McLarty-Watts	Yes
19th	West Perth	17 April 1947	Sir Ross McDonald	Liberal			1 April 1947	McLarty-Watts	Yes
19th	Toodyay	17 April 1947	Lindsay Thorn	Country			1 April 1947	McLarty-Watts	Yes
19th	Williams-Narrogin	17 April 1947	Victor Doney	Country			1 April 1947	McLarty-Watts	Yes
19th	North Perth	17 April 1947	Arthur Abbott	Liberal			1 April 1947	McLarty-Watts	Yes
19th	Pingelly	17 April 1947	Harrie Seward	Country			1 April 1947	McLarty-Watts	Yes
18th	Murchison	17 August 1945	William Marshall	Labor			3 August 1945	Wise	Yes
18th	North-East Fremantle	17 December 1943	John Tonkin	Labor			9 December 1943	Willcock	Yes
17th	Kanowna	5 April 1939	Emil Nulsen	Labor			29 March 1939	Willcock	Yes
17th	Kimberley	5 April 1939	Aubrey Coverley	Labor			29 March 1939	Willcock	Yes
16th	Leederville	9 April 1938	Alexander Panton	Labor			24 March 1938	Willcock	Yes
16th	Brown Hill-Ivanhoe	4 September 1936	Frederick Smith	Labor			27 August 1936	Willcock	Yes
16th	Northam	22 May 1936	Albert Hawke	Labor			13 May 1936	2nd Collier	Yes
15th	Gascoyne	11 April 1935	Frank Wise	Labor			26 March 1935	2nd Collier	Yes
15th	Boulder	2 May 1933	Philip Collier	Labor			24 April 1933	2nd Collier	Yes
15th	South Fremantle	2 May 1933	Alexander McCallum	Labor			24 April 1933	2nd Collier	Yes
15th	Geraldton	2 May 1933	John Willcock	Labor			24 April 1933	2nd Collier	Yes
15th	Hannans	2 May 1933	Selby Munsie	Labor			24 April 1933	2nd Collier	Yes
15th	Mount Magnet	2 May 1933	Frank Troy	Labor			24 April 1933	2nd Collier	Yes
15th	Mount Hawthorn	2 May 1933	Harry Millington	Labor			24 April 1933	2nd Collier	Yes
15th	East Perth	2 May 1933	James Kenneally	Labor			24 April 1933	2nd Collier	Yes
14th	Northam	1 May 1930	Sir James Mitchell	Nationalist			24 April 1930	2nd Mitchell	Yes
14th	York	1 May 1930	Charles Latham	Country			24 April 1930	2nd Mitchell	Yes
14th	West Perth	1 May 1930	Thomas Davy	Nationalist			24 April 1930	2nd Mitchell	Yes
14th	Maylands	1 May 1930	John Scaddan	Nationalist			24 April 1930	2nd Mitchell	Yes
14th	Mount Marshall	1 May 1930	John Lindsay	Country			24 April 1930	2nd Mitchell	Yes
14th	Nedlands	1 May 1930	Norbert Keenan	Nationalist			24 April 1930	2nd Mitchell	Yes
14th	Irwin-Moore	1 May 1930	Percy Ferguson	Country			24 April 1930	2nd Mitchell	Yes
13th	Leederville	23 December 1927	Harry Millington	Labor			15 December 1927	1st Collier	Yes
13th	Kalgoorlie	23 December 1927	James Cunningham	Labor			15 December 1927	1st Collier	Yes
13th	Hannans	9 May 1927	Selby Munsie	Labor			30 April 1927	1st Collier	Yes
12th	Boulder	1 May 1924	Philip Collier	Labor			16 April 1924	1st Collier	Yes
12th	North-East Fremantle	1 May 1924	William Angwin	Labor			16 April 1924	1st Collier	Yes
12th	Mount Magnet	1 May 1924	Frank Troy	Labor			16 April 1924	1st Collier	Yes
12th	Geraldton	1 May 1924	John Willcock	Labor			16 April 1924	1st Collier	Yes
12th	South Fremantle	1 May 1924	Alexander McCallum	Labor			16 April 1924	1st Collier	Yes
11th	Swan	31 August 1922	Richard Sampson	Country			22 August 1922	Mitchell	Yes
11th	Greenough	27 April 1921	Henry Maley	Country			13 April 1921	1st Mitchell	Yes
10th	Beverley	10 July 1919	Frank Broun	Country			25 June 1919	1st Mitchell	Yes
10th	West Perth	7 June 1919	Thomas Draper	Nationalist			17 May 1919	1st Mitchell	Yes
10th	Northam	24 April 1919	James Mitchell	Nationalist			17 April 1919	Colebatch	Yes
9th	Brown Hill-Ivanhoe	21 July 1917	John Scaddan	National Labor	John Lutey	Labor	28 June 1917	Lefroy	No
9th	Irwin	11 July 1917	James Gardiner	Nationalist			28 June 1917	Lefroy	Yes
9th	Sussex	9 August 1916	Frank Wilson	Liberal			27 July 1916	2nd Wilson	Yes
9th	Moore	9 August 1916	Sir Henry Lefroy	Liberal			27 July 1916	2nd Wilson	Yes
9th	Northam	19 August 1916	James Mitchell	Liberal			27 July 1916	2nd Wilson	Yes
9th	Murray-Wellington	9 August 1916	William George	Liberal			27 July 1916	2nd Wilson	Yes
9th	Canning	19 August 1916	Robert Robinson	Liberal			27 July 1916	2nd Wilson	Yes
9th	North-East Fremantle	2 December 1914	William Angwin	Labor			23 November 1914	Scaddan	Yes
8th	Brown Hill-Ivanhoe	17 October 1911	John Scaddan	Labor			7 October 1911	Scaddan	Yes
8th	Boulder	17 October 1911	Philip Collier	Labor			7 October 1911	Scaddan	Yes
8th	Avon	17 October 1911	Thomas Bath	Labor			7 October 1911	Scaddan	Yes
8th	Guildford	17 October 1911	William Johnson	Labor			7 October 1911	Scaddan	Yes
8th	Kanowna	17 October 1911	Thomas Walker	Labor			7 October 1911	Scaddan	Yes
7th	Subiaco	24 September 1910	Henry Daglish	Ministerial			16 September 1910	1st Wilson	Yes
7th	Greenough	8 July 1909	John Nanson	Ministerial			30 June 1909	Moore	Yes
7th	Northam	3 June 1909	James Mitchell	Ministerial			14 May 1909	Moore	Yes
6th	Fremantle	25 May 1906	James Price	Ministerial			7 May 1906	Moore	Yes
6th	Kalgoorlie	16 May 1906	Norbert Keenan	Ministerial			7 May 1906	Moore	Yes
5th	Guildford	14 September 1905	Hector Rason	Ministerial			25 August 1905	Rason	Yes
5th	Menzies	14 September 1905	Henry Gregory	Ministerial			25 August 1905	Rason	Yes
5th	Sussex	14 September 1905	Frank Wilson	Ministerial			25 August 1905	Rason	Yes
5th	Bunbury	14 September 1905	Newton Moore	Ministerial			25 August 1905	Rason	Yes
5th	Roebourne	13 September 1905	John Sydney Hicks	Ministerial			25 August 1905	Rason	Yes
5th	Brown Hill	22 June 1905	Thomas Bath	Labor			7 June 1905	Daglish	Yes
5th	Mount Leonora	30 June 1905	Patrick Lynch	Labor			7 June 1905	Daglish	Yes
5th	Subiaco	19 August 1904	Henry Daglish	Labor			10 August 1904	Daglish	Yes
5th	Mount Margaret	19 August 1904	George Taylor	Labor			10 August 1904	Daglish	Yes
5th	Kanowna	19 August 1904	Robert Hastie	Labor			10 August 1904	Daglish	Yes
5th	Murchison	19 August 1904	John Holman	Labor			10 August 1904	Daglish	Yes
5th	Kalgoorlie	19 August 1904	William Johnson	Labor			10 August 1904	Daglish	Yes
4th	Boulder	25 February 1903	John Marquis Hopkins	Oppositionist			17 February 1903	James	Yes
4th	East Perth	8 July 1902	Walter James	Oppositionist			1 July 1902	James	Yes
4th	Albany	8 July 1902	James Gardiner	Oppositionist			1 July 1902	James	Yes
4th	West Perth	7 January 1902	George Leake	Oppositionist			23 December 1901	2nd Leake	Yes
4th	Cue	2 January 1902	Frederick Illingworth	Oppositionist			23 December 1901	2nd Leake	Yes
4th	Pilbara	23 January 1902	Walter Kingsmill	Oppositionist			23 December 1901	2nd Leake	Yes
4th	Guildford	7 January 1902	Hector Rason	Oppositionist			23 December 1901	2nd Leake	Yes
4th	Menzies	2 January 1902	Henry Gregory	Oppositionist			23 December 1901	2nd Leake	Yes
4th	Coolgardie	6 December 1901	Alf Morgans	Ministerial			21 November 1901	Morgans	Yes
4th	North Murchison	10 December 1901	Frederick Moorhead	Ministerial	John Holman	Labor	21 November 1901	Morgans	No
4th	Toodyay	30 November 1901	Timothy Quinlan	Ministerial			21 November 1901	Morgans	Yes
4th	Murchison	10 December 1901	John Nanson	Ministerial			21 November 1901	Morgans	Yes
4th	Perth	6 December 1901	Frank Wilson	Ministerial	William Purkiss	Ministerial	21 November 1901	Morgans	No
4th	West Perth	12 June 1901	George Leake	Oppositionist			27 May 1901	1st Leake	Yes
4th	Cue	12 June 1901	Frederick Illingworth	Oppositionist			27 May 1901	1st Leake	Yes
4th	Pilbara	12 June 1901	Walter Kingsmill	Oppositionist			27 May 1901	1st Leake	Yes
4th	East Fremantle	12 June 1901	Joseph Holmes	Oppositionist			27 May 1901	1st Leake	Yes
4th	Menzies	12 June 1901	Henry Gregory	Oppositionist			27 May 1901	1st Leake	Yes
3rd	West Perth	22 September 1900	Barrington Wood	Ministerial			10 September 1900	Forrest	Yes
3rd	Greenough	5 November 1897	Richard Pennefather	Ministerial			27 October 1897	Forrest	Yes
3rd	Moore	26 May 1897	Henry Lefroy	Ministerial			12 May 1897	Forrest	Yes
2nd	Northam	27 March 1897	George Throssell	Ministerial			13 March 1897	Forrest	Yes
2nd	Williams	18 April 1896	Frederick Henry Piesse	Ministerial			1 April 1896	Forrest	Yes
2nd	De Grey	21 June 1895	Alexander Richardson	Ministerial			4 December 1894	Forrest	Yes
1st	Bunbury	8 January 1891	John Forrest	Ministerial			30 December 1890	Forrest	Yes
1st	Ashburton	8 January 1891	Septimus Burt	Ministerial			30 December 1890	Forrest	Yes
1st	Fremantle	8 January 1891	William Marmion	Ministerial			30 December 1890	Forrest	Yes
1st	Wellington	8 January 1891	Harry Venn	Ministerial			30 December 1890	Forrest	Yes
