= Members of the Western Australian Legislative Assembly, 1905–1908 =

This is a list of members of the Western Australian Legislative Assembly between the 1905 elections and the 1908 elections, together known as the Sixth Parliament.

Name	Party	District	Years in office
William Angwin^{[6]}	Labor	East Fremantle	1904–1905; 1906–1927
Edward Barnett	Ministerial	Albany	1905–1909
Thomas Bath	Labor	Brown Hill	1902–1914
Harry Bolton	Labor	North Fremantle	1904–1917
James Brebber	Ministerial	North Perth	1905–1908
Harry Brown	Ministerial	Perth	1904–1911
Thomas Brown^{[7]}	Labor	Geraldton	1906–1908
William Butcher	Ministerial	Gascoyne	1901–1911; 1915–1917
Henry Carson^{[7]}	Ministerial	Geraldton	1904–1906; 1908–1911
Philip Collier	Labor	Boulder	1905–1948
Frank Cowcher	Ministerial	Williams	1904–1911
Henry Daglish	Ministerial^{[10]}	Subiaco	1901–1911
Arthur Davies^{[3]}	Ministerial	South Fremantle	1906–1911
Arthur Diamond^{[3]}	Ministerial	South Fremantle	1901–1906
Thomas Draper^{[9]}	Ministerial	West Perth	1907–1911; 1917–1921
William Eddy^{[2]}	Ministerial	Coolgardie	1905–1908
John Ewing	Ministerial	Collie	1901–1904; 1905–1908
John Foulkes	Ministerial	Claremont	1902–1911
William Gordon	Ministerial	Canning	1901–1911
Henry Gregory	Ministerial	Menzies	1897–1911
Arthur Gull	Ministerial	Swan	1905–1908
John Hardwick	Ministerial	East Perth	1904–1911; 1914–1921
Thomas Hayward	Ministerial	Wellington	1901–1911
Edward Heitmann	Labor	Cue	1904–1913; 1914–1917
John Sydney Hicks	Ministerial	Roebourne	1901–1908
John Holman	Labor	Murchison	1901–1921; 1923–1925
Joseph Holmes^{[6]}	Ministerial	East Fremantle	1897–1904; 1905–1906
Austin Horan	Labor	Yilgarn	1904–1911
Charles Hudson	Labor	Dundas	1905–1921
Frederick Illingworth^{[9]}	Ministerial	West Perth	1894–1904; 1905–1907
James Isdell^{[5]}	Ministerial	Pilbara	1903–1906
William Johnson^{[4]}	Labor	Guildford	1901–1905; 1906–1917; 1924–1948
Norbert Keenan^{[1]}	Ind / Min	Kalgoorlie	1905–1911; 1930–1950
Charles Layman	Ministerial	Nelson	1904–1914
Patrick Lynch^{[8]}	Labor	Mount Leonora	1904–1906
Arthur Male	Ministerial	Kimberley	1905–1917
John McLarty	Ministerial	Murray	1904–1909
James Mitchell	Ministerial	Northam	1905–1933
Frederick Monger	Ministerial	York	1892–1903; 1905–1914
Newton Moore	Ministerial	Bunbury	1904–1911
Samuel Moore	Ministerial	Irwin	1904–1914
Frederick Henry Piesse	Ministerial	Katanning	1890–1909
James Price^{[1]}	Ministerial	Fremantle	1905–1910
Timothy Quinlan	Ministerial	Toodyay	1890–1894; 1897–1911
Hon Sir Cornthwaite Rason^{[4]}	Ministerial	Guildford	1897–1906
John Scaddan	Labor	Ivanhoe	1904–1917; 1919–1924; 1930–1933
Edmund Smith	Ministerial	Beverley	1905–1908
Patrick Stone	Ministerial	Greenough	1901–1904; 1905–1908
Julian Stuart^{[8]}	Labor	Mount Leonora	1906–1908
George Taylor	Labor	Mount Margaret	1901–1930
Michael Troy	Labor	Mount Magnet	1904–1939
Henry Underwood^{[5]}	Labor	Pilbara	1906–1924
John Veryard	Ministerial	Balcatta	1905–1908; 1914–1921
Thomas Walker	Labor	Kanowna	1905–1932
Francis Ware	Labor	Hannans	1905–1911
Albert Wilson	Labor / Ind	Forrest	1904–1908
Frank Wilson	Ministerial	Sussex	1897–1901; 1904–1917

== Notes ==
^{1} James Price (Fremantle) and Norbert Keenan (Kalgoorlie) were appointed by the premier, Newton Moore, as minister for works and attorney-general respectively on 7 May 1906. Both were therefore required to resign and contest ministerial by-elections on 25 May 1906, at which both were returned.
^{2} Following the 1905 state election, Ministerial member William Eddy, who had won the seat of Coolgardie by 23 votes against Labor's Charles McDowall in a three-candidate contest, faced a by-election after a petition was lodged against his return. He resigned on 27 April 1906, and was returned at the by-election on 9 July 1906 with a majority of 100 against McDowall.
^{3} The member for South Fremantle, Arthur Diamond, died on 22 June 1906. Arthur Davies won the resulting by-election on 16 July 1906.
^{4} Sir Cornthwaite Rason, the Ministerialist member for Guildford and former premier, resigned on 27 June 1906 to take up the position of Agent-General for Western Australia in London. At the resulting by-election on 16 July 1906, Labor candidate William Johnson won the seat.
^{5} On 27 June 1906, the member for Pilbara, James Isdell, resigned his seat. At the resulting by-election on 23 July 1906, Labor candidate Henry Underwood won the seat.
^{6} Following the 1905 state election, Ministerial member Joseph Holmes, who had won the seat of East Fremantle by 20 votes (1.0%) against Labor's William Angwin, faced a by-election after a petition was upheld against his return on 24 October 1906. He was defeated by Angwin at the by-election on 13 November 1906, who won 71.37% of the vote.
^{7} Following the 1905 state election, Ministerial member Henry Carson, who had won the seat of Geraldton by 26 votes (Black (1997) notes some sources say 12 votes) against Labor's Thomas Brown, faced a by-election after a petition was upheld against his return on 26 October 1906. He was defeated by Brown at the by-election on 21 November 1906 by 19 votes.
^{8} On 2 November 1906, the Labor member for Mount Leonora, Patrick Lynch, resigned his seat. At the resulting by-election on 13 November 1906, Labor member Julian Stuart was returned unopposed.
^{9} On 13 August 1907, the member for West Perth, Frederick Illingworth, resigned his seat. At the resulting by-election on 2 September 1907, National Political League candidate Thomas Draper won the seat, and joined the Ministerial group in the Legislative Assembly.
^{10} Henry Daglish, the former Labor Premier and member for Subiaco, resigned from the Labor Party before the 1905 election, and was elected under an "Independent Labor" designation.

== Sources ==
- Black, David; Prescott, Valerie (1997). Election statistics, Legislative Assembly of Western Australia, 1890-1996. Perth: Parliamentary History Project. ISBN 0-7309-8409-5.
- Hughes, Colin A.; Graham, B. D. (1976). Voting for the South Australian, Western Australian and Tasmanian Lower Houses, 1890-1964. Canberra: Australian National University. ISBN 0-7081-1334-6.
- Western Australian Government Gazettes for 1905, 1906 and 1907; Indexed under "Electoral".
