= Members of the Western Australian Legislative Assembly, 1890–1894 =

This is a list of members of the Western Australian Legislative Assembly between the 1890 elections and the 1894 elections, known as the First Parliament. They held office under the Constitution Act 1889, which was given royal assent by Queen Victoria on 15 August 1890 and took effect on 21 October 1890 with a proclamation by the new Governor of Western Australia, Sir William Robinson.

== Members ==
Name	District	Years in office
William Leonard Baker ^{[8]}	East Kimberley	1890–1893
Septimus Burt ^{[1]}	Ashburton	1890–1900
Alfred Canning	East Perth	1890–1894
Barnard Clarkson	Toodyay	1890–1897
Francis Connor ^{[8]}	East Kimberley	1893–1904
Joseph Cookworthy	Sussex	1890–1897
Everard Darlot	Murchison	1890–1894
Lancel de Hamel	Albany	1890–1894
Alexander Forrest	West Kimberley	1890–1900
Hon Sir John Forrest ^{[1]}	Bunbury	1890–1901
Charles Harper	Beverley	1890–1905
Albert Hassell	Plantagenet	1890–1904
Edward Vivien Harvey Keane ^{[3]}	Geraldton	1890–1891
George Leake ^{[2]}	Roebourne	1890; 1894–1900; 1901–1902
James George Lee-Steere	Nelson	1890–1903
Henry Lefroy ^{[5]}	Moore	1892–1901
William Loton	Swan	1890–1897
William Marmion ^{[1]}	Fremantle	1890–1896
Thomas Molloy ^{[4]}	Perth	1892–1894
Frederick Monger ^{[7]}	York	1892–1903
Stephen Henry Parker ^{[7]}	York	1890–1892
William Paterson	Murray	1890–1895
William Silas Pearse	North Fremantle	1890–1895
Samuel J. Phillips	Irwin	1890–1904
Frederick Henry Piesse	Williams	1890–1909
Timothy Quinlan	West Perth	1890–1894; 1897–1911
George Randell ^{[5]}	Moore	1890–1892
Alexander Richardson	De Grey	1890–1897
Edward Scott ^{[4]}	Perth	1890–1891
Horace Sholl ^{[2]}	Roebourne	1891–1901
Robert Frederick Sholl	Gascoyne	1890–1897
George Simpson ^{[3]}	Geraldton	1891–1899
Elias Solomon ^{[6]}	South Fremantle	1892–1901
David Symon ^{[6]}	South Fremantle	1890–1892
George Throssell	Northam	1890–1904
William Traylen	Greenough	1890–1897
Harry Venn ^{[1]}	Wellington	1890–1901

== Notes ==
^{1} The members for Ashburton (Septimus Burt), Bunbury (John Forrest), Fremantle (William Marmion) and Wellington (Harry Venn), upon being appointed as Ministers of the Crown, were required to resign their seats, which they did on 30 December 1890, and stand for their seats again at ministerial by-elections. All were unopposed, and were returned on 8 January 1891.
^{2} On 30 December 1890, at the first sitting of parliament, George Leake resigned from the seat of Roebourne, and Horace Sholl was returned unopposed at the resulting byelection on 16 January 1891.
^{3} In November 1891, Edward Vivien Harvey Keane resigned from the seat of Geraldton, and George Simpson was returned unopposed at the resulting byelection on 10 December 1891.
^{4} In December 1891, Edward Scott resigned from the seat of Perth, and at the byelection on 12 January 1892, Thomas Molloy was elected to fill the vacancy.
^{5} On 4 July 1892, George Randell resigned from the seat of Moore, and Henry Lefroy was returned unopposed at the resulting byelection on 11 August 1892.
^{6} On 13 September 1892, David Symon resigned from the seat of South Fremantle, and at the byelection on 12 October 1892, Elias Solomon was elected to fill the vacancy.
^{7} On 5 October 1892, Stephen Henry Parker resigned from the seat of York, and Frederick Monger was returned unopposed at the resulting byelection on 27 October 1892.
^{8} On 7 January 1893, William Leonard Baker died, leaving the seat of East Kimberley vacant. Francis Connor was returned unopposed at the resulting byelection on 20 April 1893.

== Sources ==
- Black, David; Prescott, Valerie (1997). Election statistics, Legislative Assembly of Western Australia, 1890-1996. Perth: Parliamentary History Project. ISBN 0-7309-8409-5.
- Hughes, Colin A.; Graham, B. D. (1976). Voting for the South Australian, Western Australian and Tasmanian Lower Houses, 1890-1964. Canberra: Australian National University. ISBN 0-7081-1334-6.
