= George Alfred Davies =

Australian politician

George Alfred Davies J.P.
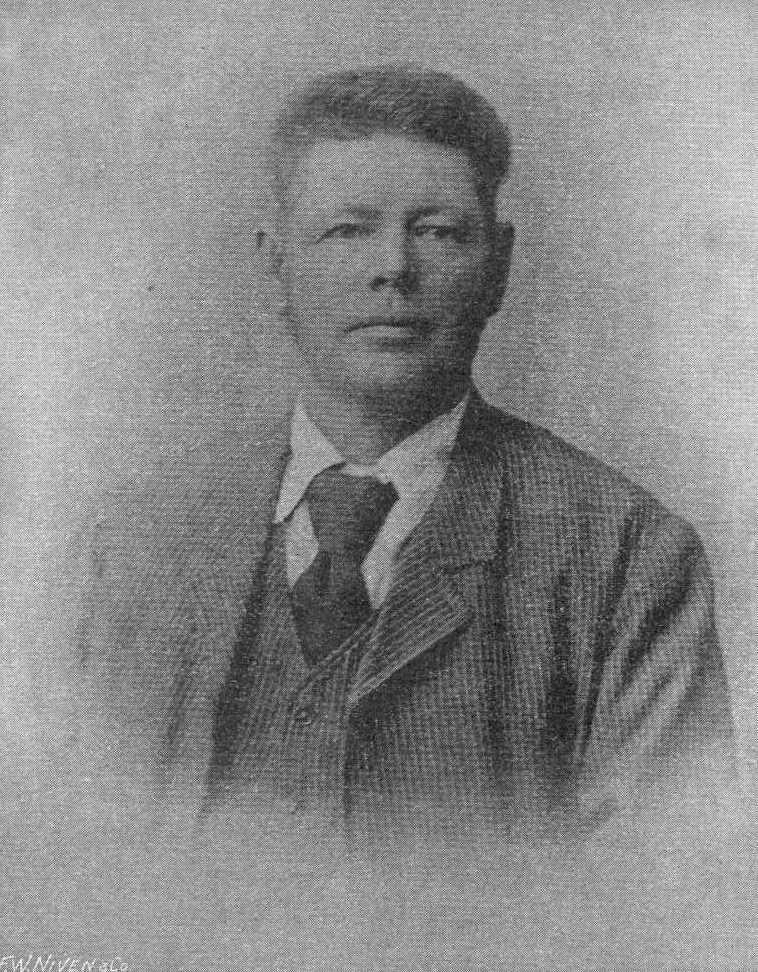
- G.A.Davies
- Born: 1846; Fremantle
- Died: 31 January 1897 (aged 50–51); Beaconsfield, Western Australia
- Spouse: Letitia "Letty" Davies (née King)
- Children: George; Emma Elizabeth; May Elizabeth; Ernest Edgar; Ethel May; Harold Alfred; Nellie Hannah; Georgina Adeline
- Parent: Alfred Alexander Davies
- Relatives: Arthur E. (brother); Edward William (brother)

George Alfred Davies (1846 – 31 January 1897) was an Australian-born Mayor of his native Fremantle. He was a founding director of the Fremantle Building Society and a Justice of the Peace. He built the Oddfellows Hotel in Fremantle, which became the heritage listed Norfolk Hotel.

== Life ==
George Alfred Davies' grandfather, Alfred George Davies, was said to be one of the first settlers in Fremantle, arriving 19 April 1834 on the Quebec Trader, only a few years after Captain Fremantle claimed West Australia for Britain. His father, Alfred Alexander Davies (1813-1875), was twenty-one when he emigrated with his parents and younger brother, Thomas, to Western Australia. Alfred Davies married twice, and had many children, including: George born in 1846, Edward William Davies born in 1855 and Arthur Elvin Davies, born in 1866.

George attended school in Fremantle until he joined his father's business at the age of seventeen. Alfred Davies, between 1849 and 1869, built extensive real estate holdings along some of Fremantle's main streets and operated a pawnbroking business between 1870 and 1874. George formed his own business after working with his father for a decade. Davies sold spirits but he was to become well known for his wine, which he bottled and sold at premises known as the Grosvenor Cellars, in High Street and Bannister Street in Fremantle. The cellars also held bottling equipment, which enabled his business to buy in grapes to supply the demand for his creation. In 1892 Davies was one of only three people who had a colonial wine licence in Fremantle.

In 1875, he married Letitia "Letty" King (1853-1948), with whom he had nine children: George (1872-1940), an unnamed girl (1878-1878), Emma Elizabeth (1879-), Mary Elizabeth (1879-), Ernest Edgar (1884-1914), Ethel May (1888-), Harold Alfred (1893-), Nellie Hannah (1895-) and Georgina Adeline (1897-).

Davies was active in public life and supported the idea of enterprises and facilities in public ownership. He was involved in establishing public baths on the sea front and in ensuring that the more attractive land around Fremantle was not sold off.

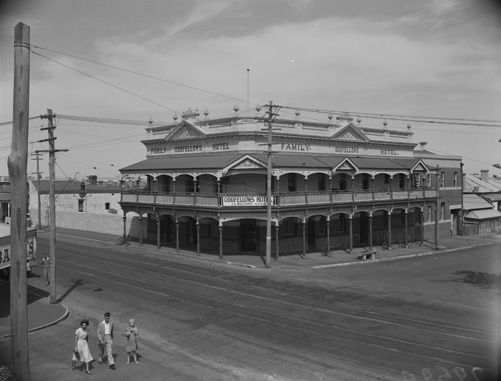
The Oddfellows Hotel in 1950

Davies owned a plot of land in 1880, which he rented out, but he appears to have had the land cleared by the time he planned a new hotel building. This building, which opened in 1887, was on the corner of South Terrace and Norfolk Street and was known as the Oddfellows Hotel. This building is heritage listed and is still standing, and is now known as the Norfolk Hotel.

Davies and his brother Edward were directors of the Fremantle Building Society, which Davies saw as important as it enabled others to establish themselves as property owners.

Davies was elected Mayor of Fremantle in December 1894 and was made a Justice of the Peace in March 1895. He is said to have been offered a second term from November 1896 but did not take it in order to allow others to share the honour of being mayor. He was succeeded by Elias Solomon.

Davies died in Fremantle on 31 January 1897 and was buried in Fremantle Cemetery.
