= John T. Short =

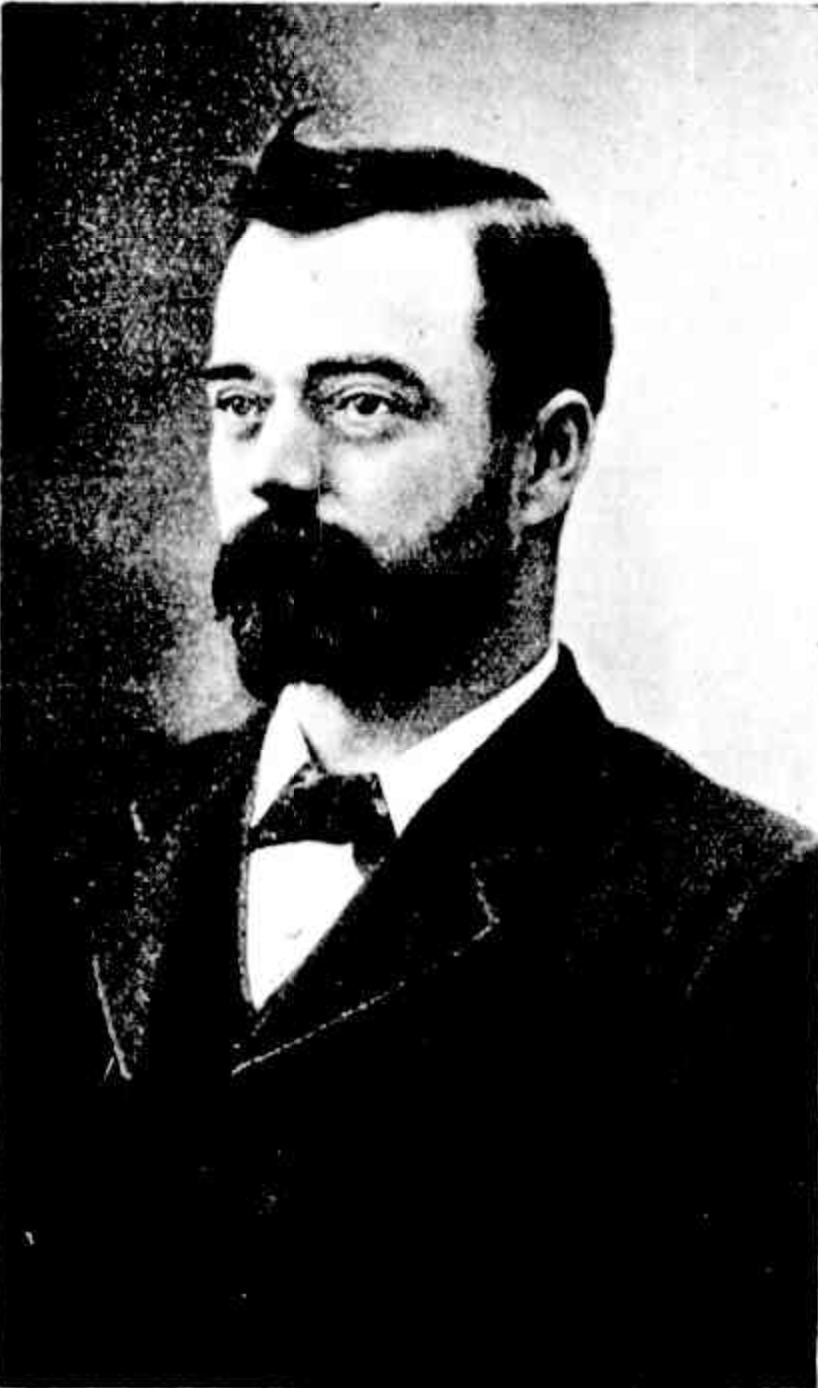
John Short in 1897

John Tregerthen Short (27 July 1858 – 26 January 1933) was the commissioner of the Western Australian Government Railways from 1908 until 1919.

== Biography ==
Short was born in St Ives, Cornwall, which he left for a life at sea at an early age. In 1878 he left his ship at Port Adelaide and joined the South Australian Railways, and after a rapid series of promotions was in 1881 appointed stationmaster at Petersburg, between Adelaide and Broken Hill — a major terminal in the age of steam and when the South Australian railway network was more extensive than today. In 1889 he left for Western Australia to take charge of the Great Southern Railway whose line ran from Beverley to Albany. In 1896 the line was taken over by the Western Australian Government Railways (WAGR) and the following year Short was appointed Chief Traffic Manager for the WAGR.

In 1906 a royal commission was held to investigate allegations raised in parliament by Harry Bolton that Short and George Julius had engaged railway tradesmen to do work for them on government time, and that the Commissioner, William George, had colluded by suppressing the information. The commission found the allegations baseless. In 1907 Short succeeded George, first as acting Commissioner, and in July 1908 to the substantive position, and made permanent in 1913. He retired on 30 June 1919.

He died at his home in Altona Street, West Perth and his remains were interred at the Guildford Cemetery.

== Retrospect ==
His tenure of eleven years was notable as a period of great expansion (190 miles of line in 1896 to 1,516 in 1904), but he created considerable resentment in the goldfields area of Kalgoorlie and Coolgardie when some passenger services were cancelled. His successor, Colonel Pope, was more diplomatic, and able to implement changes without arousing unnecessary resistance.

== Family ==
Short was married to Lorie Caroline Short (died c. 9 August 1937). Among their children were:

- Mary Short
- May Short married Joseph Robert Woodruff Gardam on 17 November 1913
- Grace Short married D. Eardley McLaren on 22 February 1932

one of these daughters was born in Petersburg, SA on 4 November 1882.

- second son Martin Short (c. September 1888 – 29 June 1900)
