= Castlemaine Brewery, Western Australia =

Australian brewery (1896–1927)

Castlemaine Brewery
- Industry: Alcoholic beverage
- Founded: 1896
- Founder: Howard Newman Sleigh (Sleigh and Co.)
- Defunct: 1927
- Headquarters: East Fremantle, Western Australia, Australia
- Products: Beer
- Owner: Swan Brewery

The Castlemaine Brewery was opened in 1896 by Howard Norman Sleigh at Riverside Road in East Fremantle, Western Australia and boasted a successful trading history until 1927 when the company was taken over by the Swan Brewery.

== History ==
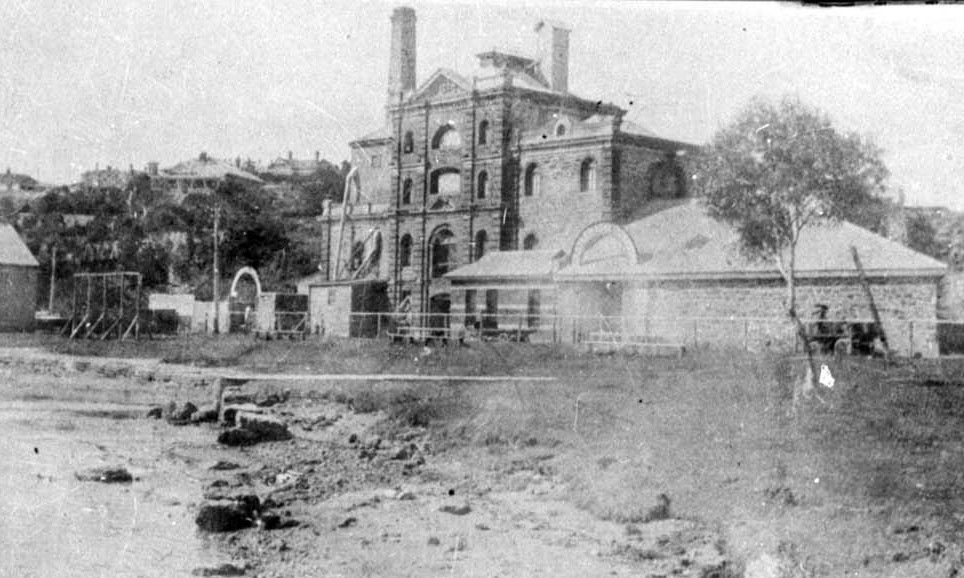
The brewery in the 1900s

The Castlemaine Brewery was established in 1896 by Howard Norman Sleigh (1870–1957), with John Hugh Gracie (1855–1927) as head brewer. Sleigh, who was born in Bristol, emigrated to Australia in 1888, with his father Hamilton Norman Sleigh, an English Brewer. Sleigh was previously involved in establishing the West Australian Brewery at Barndon Hill (now known as Burswood), leaving the business in mid-1896. The West Australian Brewery became the Swallow Brewery in 1905, and in 1912 the Red Castle Brewery until it closed in 1953. Gracie, who was born in Tasmania, was the chief brewer at Cascade Brewery prior to moving to Western Australia. The brewing equipment was sourced by Sleigh from a former brewery at Koondrook on the Murray River in Victoria.

In 1901 the partnership, Sleigh and Co., was dissolved with Sleigh moving back to Melbourne. The Castlemaine Brewery was purchased by Gracie and Walter Frederick Walkley (1872–1936). In 1906 they purchased the nearby Phoenix Brewery. In 1910 Walkley returned to South Australia. In 1912 Gracie, the managing director of Castlemaine, retired. Castlemaine acquired a number of local hotels, including the Commercial and Beaconsfield Hotels in 1920, the Oddfellows Hotel in 1922, and the Richmond Hotel in 1925.

In 1927 the Castlemaine Brewery Co. was purchased by the Swan Brewery for £29,065 and 32,500 Swan Brewery shares. Swan subsequently closed the brewery, employing the majority of the workforce at the Perth operations.

The former brewery building was demolished to make way for the construction of the Stirling Bridge, linking Fremantle to North Fremantle.

== Beers ==
- Castlemaine Bitter Ale
- Penguin Pale Ale
- Invalid Stout

== See also ==
- List of breweries in Australia
