= Norfolk Hotel, Fremantle =

Hotel in Fremantle, Western Australia

Norfolk Hotel
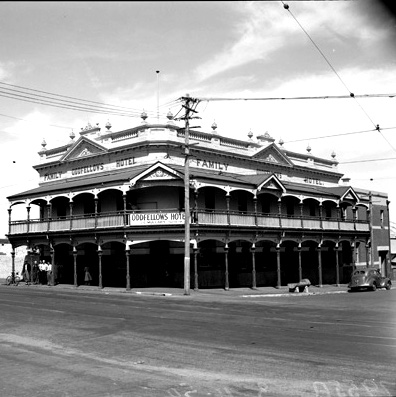
- Oddfellows Hotel in 1950 before the 1985 redesign
- Alternative names: Oddfellows Hotel

General information
- Type: Hotel
- Architectural style: Victorian Georgian
- Location: Corner South Terrace and Norfolk Street, 47, South Terrace, Fremantle, Fremantle
- Coordinates: 32°03′25″S 115°44′58″E
- Current tenants: Garry Gosatti
- Opened: 1887
- Renovated: 1929, 1985
- Client: George Alfred Davies
- Landlord: Prendiville Group

Technical details
- Floor count: 2

Renovating team
- Architects: Allen and Nicholas (1929)

Website
- www.norfolkhotel.com.au

The Norfolk Hotel is located on the corner of South Terrace and Norfolk Street in Fremantle, Western Australia. The stone built hotel was originally constructed in 1887 before the 1893 Kalgoorlie gold rush for George Alfred Davies, a vintner, local councillor and Mayor of Fremantle. For most of its life it was known as the Oddfellows Hotel; it was renamed when it was substantially renovated in 1985.

== History ==
The Oddfellows Hotel was constructed by 1877 for George Alfred Davies, who was a well known wine and spirit dealer. Davies had been born in Fremantle in 1846 to a family who had settled in Western Australia only five years after Captain Fremantle first claimed the area for Britain. After working for a number of years with his father, Albert, he established Grosvenor Cellars, selling alcoholic beverages and making his own wine. Davies was also active in public life, serving, in time, as a local councillor and in 1895 as the Mayor of Fremantle.

The land where the hotel stands was where Davies was renting out cottages in 1880. Davies applied and received a title deed to all the land in 1884 and in 1887 the first record is seen of the stone-built hotel. The hotel was a successful business that survived George Davies' death in 1897. The hotel was put into a trust that was operated by his widow, Letty Davies, and brothers, George Davies and Arthur Elvin Davies.

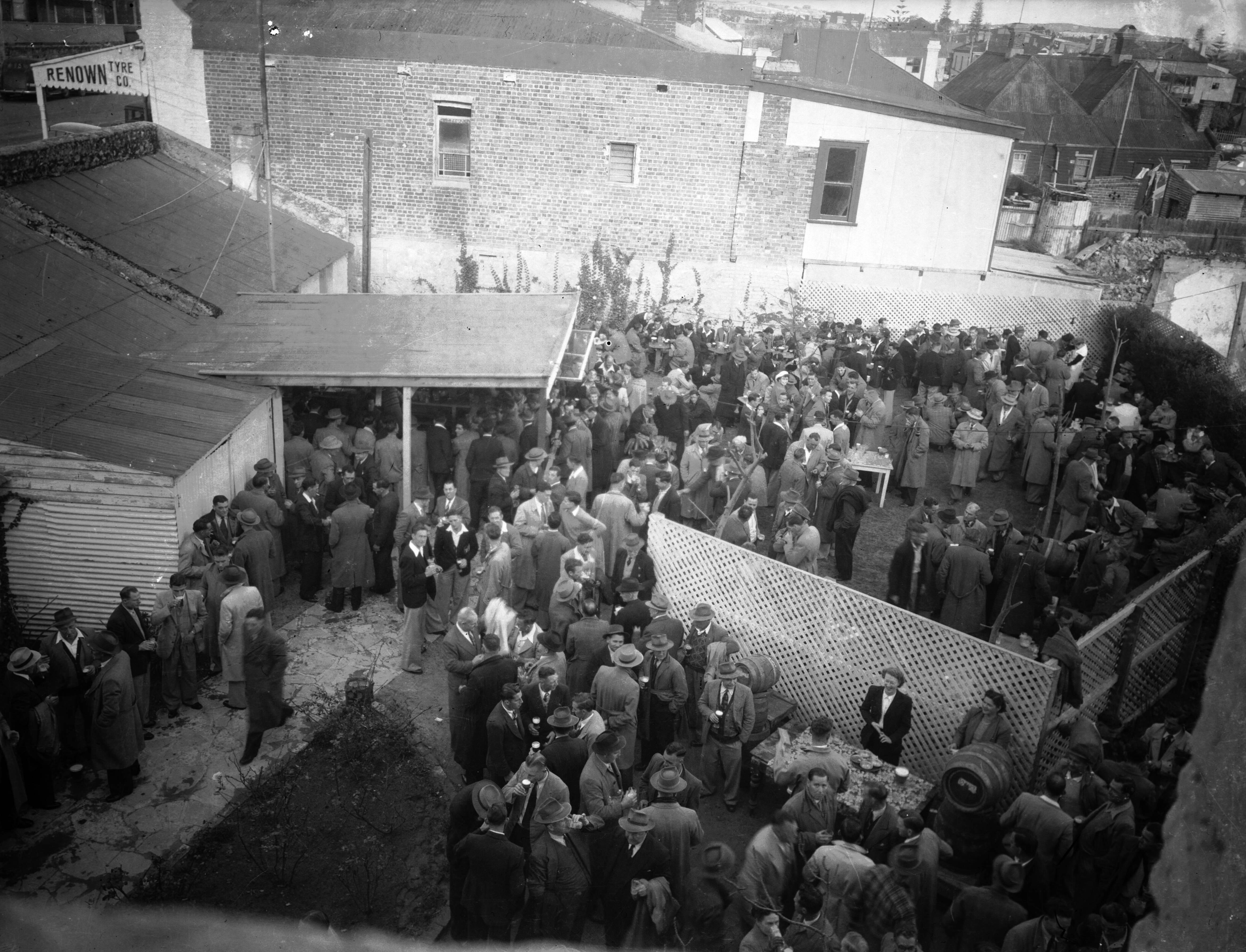
Derby Day in the Oddfellows Hotel garden in 1953

The building was internally redesigned around 1920 when the emphasis of the business changed from offering overnight accommodation to offering alcoholic drinks and hospitality. Shortly afterwards in 1922, the local brewery of Castlemaine Brewery purchased the building from the trustees. Within five years, the Oddfellows Hotel was being operated by the Swan Brewery as they merged with Castlemaine.

The Swan brewery operated the hotel for over fifty years and a photo from the 1950s shows the building supporting tram lines on the corner of South Terrace and Norfolk Street. The brewery sold the hotel in 1952 to the first of a long line of private owners and another picture shows the beer garden packed with revellers on Derby Day on 26 December 1953.

== Norfolk Hotel ==
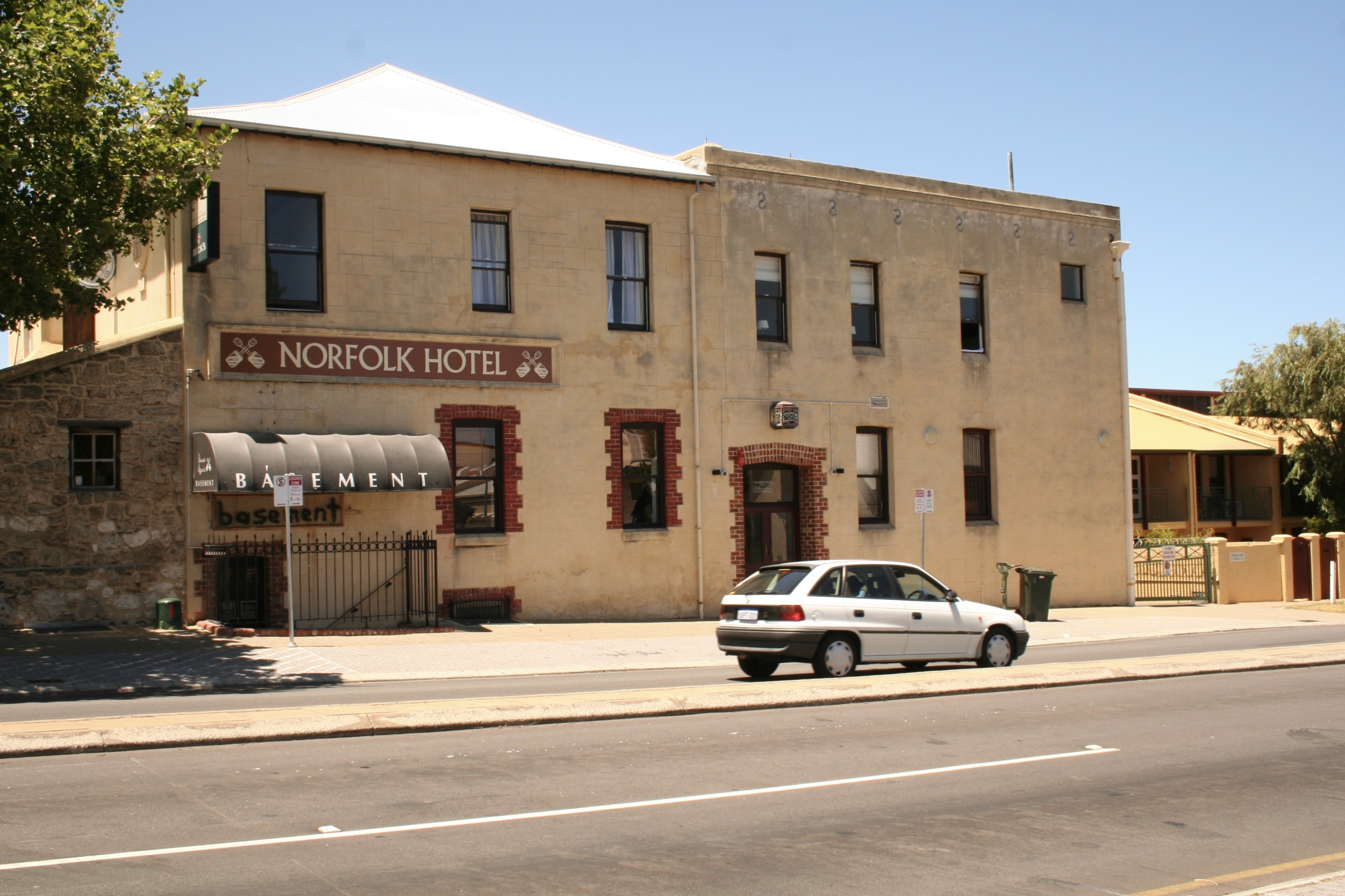
The hotel in 2009

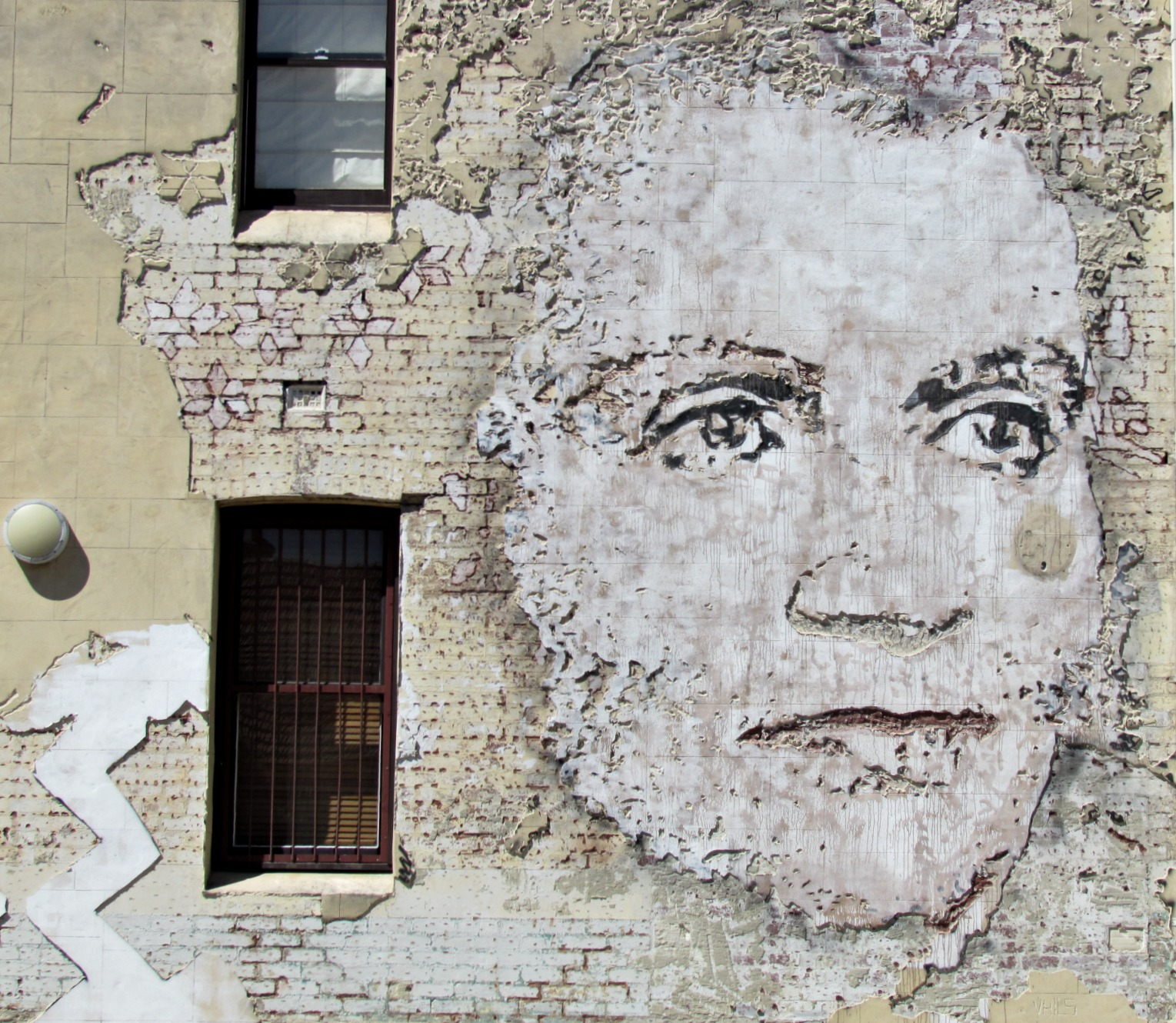
Dame Dorothy Tangney DBE

The Oddfellows Hotel was subject to major alterations just two years before its centenary, in preparation for the 1987 America's Cup Defence. In 1985, A$500,000, equivalent to A$1.62 million in 2022, was invested in renovating the building. A considerable part of the hotel was demolished and a small courtyard was created. The building still has two floors, a galvanised steel roof with a central feature chimney and a basement with its entrance from Norfolk Street. A retained feature are the wooden doors on the first floor through which loads could be hoisted.

The building was sold for a reported one million Australian dollars to a micro brewery business, Brewtech Pty Ltd, who were the owners of the nearby Sail and Anchor Hotel. In 1987 Brewtech changed its name to the Matilda Bay Brewing Company, and in 1990 Matilda Bay was purchased by the Foster's Group. In 1989 the hotel lease was purchased by Garry Gosatti, one of the original partners behind the Matilda Bay Brewing Company.

In 1992 the building was purchased by the Prendiville Group, whose portfolio includes Sandalford Winery, Karratha International Hotel, Cottesloe Beach Hotel and the Grand Hotel Townsville.

In 2001 Gosatti renovated the basement of the hotel, converting it into a music venue; since early 2002 it has been used as an original music venue called The Basement and is now known as Odd Fellows Bar.

During the 2013 Fremantle Street Arts Festival the Norfolk Hotel was decorated with a wall sculpture of the first female Australian senator. The image of Dorothy Tangney was carved by the Portuguese artist Vhils and his assistants. Vhils is known for digging into the surface to create his sculptures.

== Heritage value ==
The building is listed on the City of Fremantle's municipal heritage list in September 2000. The basis for the listing is the building's association with George Davies and because this is an unusual stone built structure that dates from before the 1893 Kalgoorlie Gold Rush.

== Cultural references ==
The hotel is referenced in the song "Norfolk Hotel" by French psychedelic musician Melody's Echo Chamber, co-written and produced by Fremantle local Kevin Parker of Tame Impala.
