= List of mayors of Cockburn =

The City of Cockburn in Perth, Western Australia was originally established on 12 February 1871 as the Fremantle Road Board with a chairman and councillors under the District Roads Act 1871. It was renamed Cockburn on 21 January 1955, and with the passage of the Local Government Act 1960, all road boards became Shires with a shire president and councillors effective 1 July 1961. The Shire of Cockburn was declared a town on 24 January 1971, at which point the president became a mayor. Cockburn attained city status on 26 October 1979.

== Chairmen ==
Chairman	Term
Edward Higham	1871–1876
Henry Maxwell Lefroy	1876–1879
William Silas Pearse	1879–1880
Walter Easton	1880–1881
Joshua Harwood	1881–1887
James Herbert	1887–1892
Walter Easton	1892–1894
Walter Powell	1895–1900
Robert Holmes	1900–1905
Arthur Davies	1905–1911
John Cooke	1911–1916
William Reason	1916–1917
Henry Dixon	1917–1919
John Cooke	1919–1921
William Reason	1921–1925
Edwin Follington	1925–1926
Angus McLeod	1926–1929
Alfred Newman	1929–1930
Edwin John Follington	1930–1932
Alfred Mayor	1932–1935
Walton Matthew Winfield	1935–1939
John Willis^{[1]}	1939–1944
Andrew Bailey	1944–1945
Alfred Isted	1945–1946
George Wells	1946–1947
Sydney Frank Jesse Hammond	1947–1949
Alfred Mayor	1949–1950
Edward James Smith	1950–1953
Joseph Henry Cooper	1953–1961

^{1} John Willis died on 19 September 1944. Andrew Bailey was elected by the other councillors to fill the remainder of his term, which expired on 21 April 1945.

== Mayors ==
Mayor	Term
Joseph Cooper	1961–1972
Alan Thomas	1972–1979
Don de san Miguel (OAM)	1979–1993
Ray Lees	1993–1997
John Grljusich	1997–2000
Stephen Lee	2000–2009
Logan Howlett	2009–present
