= Samuel Rocke =

Australian politician

Member of the Legislative Assembly of Western Australia
- In office 29 September 1917 – 12 March 1921
- Preceded by: Harry Bolton
- Succeeded by: Alick McCallum
- Constituency: South Fremantle

Personal details
- Born: 7 September 1874 Mornington Peninsula, Victoria, Australia
- Died: 3 June 1963 (aged 88) Kurri Kurri, New South Wales, Australia
- Party: Independent

Samuel Matthew Rocke (7 September 1874 – 3 June 1963) was an Australian politician who served as an independent member of the Legislative Assembly of Western Australia from 1917 to 1921, representing the seat of South Fremantle.

Rocke was born on Victoria's Mornington Peninsula to Sarah (née Jennings) and Andrew Rocke. He arrived in Western Australia in 1895 and settled in Fremantle, where he initially worked as a produce merchant before joining the public service. He became the assistant storekeeper at Fremantle Prison in 1910. Rocke entered parliament at the 1917 state election, winning South Fremantle as an "Independent Labor" candidate by just six votes over Harry Bolton, the sitting National Labor Party member. He served a single term in parliament before suffering a heavy defeat at the 1921 election, where he polled just 9.2 percent on first preferences. After leaving politics, Rocke eventually moved to New South Wales, where he worked for Sanitarium Australia. He died in Kurri Kurri in June 1963, aged 88.

Parliament of Western Australia
Preceded by Harry Bolton	Member for South Fremantle; 1917–1921	Succeeded by Alick McCallum
