= Edward William Davies =

Australian politician

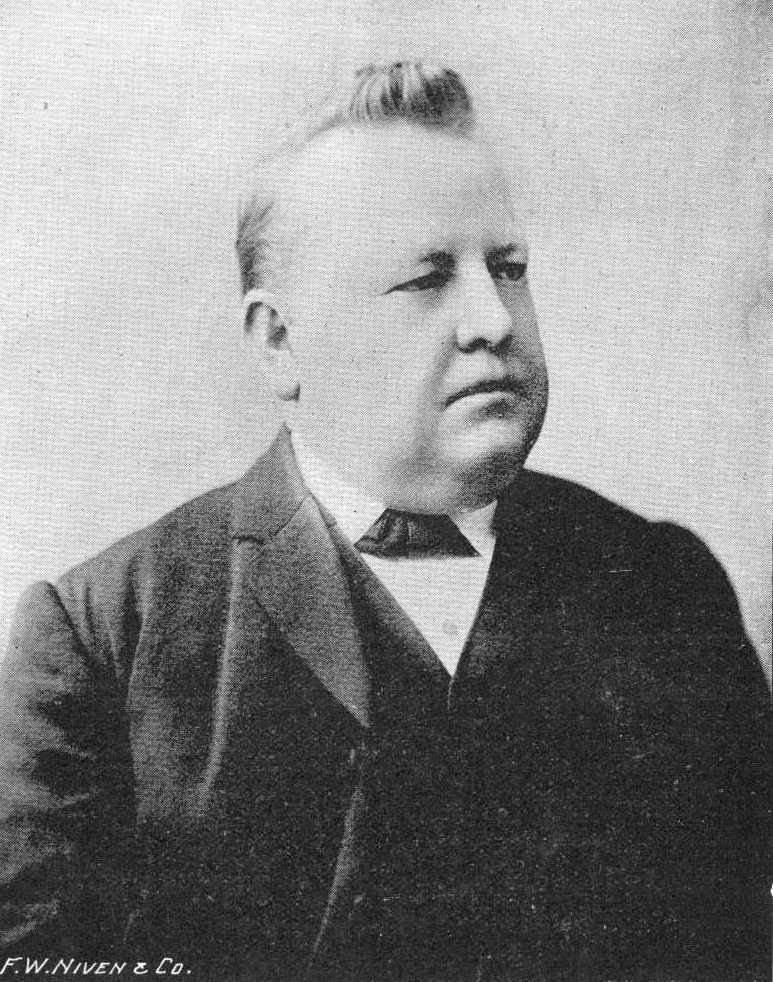
- Davies in 1897
- Born: 1855; Fremantle, Western Australia
- Died: 1904 (aged 48–49); Grosvenor Private Hospital, Fremantle
- Occupations: businessman, politician
- Known for: removed as mayor of Fremantle, Western Australia on the grounds of insanity
- Spouse: Kate Murray (m. 1875)
- Father: Alfred Alexander Davies
- Relatives: George Alfred Davies (brother)

Edward William Davies (1855–1904) was elected mayor of Fremantle, Western Australia, in 1901, but was removed two months later on the grounds of insanity.

== Background ==
Davies was the son of Alfred Alexander Davies, who had arrived in Fremantle in 1834 and who had another son, George Alfred Davies, who was born in 1846. Edward Davies was born in Fremantle in 1855. In 1875 his father died, and in December that year Davies married Kate Murray. In July 1876, Davies appeared in court on a charge of seduction brought against him by William Thorpe, a farmer, on behalf of his daughter Rosina.

In the early 1880s Davies became a pawnbroker. At the same time, he was working to improve his social position in Fremantle: he joined local lodges, institutes and societies and was active on their committees, and in 1887 became rate collector to the Fremantle Municipal Council. He eventually resigned as rate collector in August 1888 after protesting that "from the very illiberal manner his demands had received in many quarters since starting in July, in consequence no doubt of the general depression, he felt that his talents were not equal to the occasion." Despite this, Davies took up the position again in early 1890.

With the onset of a gold rush in Western Australia 1893, Davies’ property investments paid dividends and he was elected to Fremantle Municipal Council. In July 1894 he was also elected to the colony's Legislative Council, and in 1897 his profile appeared in W. B. Kimberly's History of West Australia: A narrative of her past, together with biographies of its leading men. The piece noted that ‘there is a happy disposition suggested in his face, which on personal acquaintance is established most emphatically.’

== Election as mayor and removal from office ==
In April 1900, Davies was also appointed a Justice of the Peace, and on 17 April 1901, he was elected unopposed by the Council as mayor of Fremantle. He was to serve the balance of retiring mayor Edward Solomon's term, and was installed on 26 April 1901.

Davies carried out his initial public duties without attracting comment, but on the night of 17 May 1901, he delivered a furious outburst to a Fremantle Municipal Council meeting. The majority of councillors held a special meeting the following Monday evening to ask for his resignation. Davies attended a football match on 25 May and exhibited ‘erratic behaviour’, and then at a boxing match on 28 May he lavishly distributed money around him.

That evening, Davies was examined by local Fremantle physicians Drs Thomas Davy and William Birmingham and certified as insane. He was removed to the nearby Grosvenor Private Hospital, and Davy told the West Australian newspaper that Davies had ‘been afflicted with a brain disorder for some time past, and the excitement which he had experienced since he became Mayor of the Port, on April 21 [sic] last, had done him so much injury that he had become insane.’ Davies was discharged by court order from the Grosvenor Hospital on around 8 or 9 June 1901. His own doctor, Henry Lotz, later told the Supreme Court that he had treated Davies for gout complicated by heavy drinking in June 1901; that he had recommended the Grosvenor Hospital, and that Davies had gone there and then made ‘a rapid recovery’.

Once released from hospital, Davies refused to resign from the mayorship, forcing the two other candidates for the position to stand down. There were complaints in July 1901 that the ‘three Mayors’ were disrupting the civic management of Fremantle. The situation was eventually resolved and Davies was replaced, but in September 1901 Dr Thomas Davy sued another local newspaper, the Daily News, for publishing a letter which suggested that he had falsely certified Davies. The newspaper admitted the libel, printed a public apology, and paid £50 damages and costs.

== Increasing illness ==
Davies was able to travel to England in August 1901 and stayed away for four months. When he returned at the end of 1901, he began spending most of his time indoors in a darkened room, and suffered another attack of gout. Davies’ erratic behaviour also now involved his estate: he ‘purchased a lot of land … [and] raised money by selling the Terminus Hotel, and by mortgaging some other land.’

In July 1902 Davies told Dr Henry Lotz that he was actually the long-lost son of the Duke of York (who later became King George V), and in August 1902 he complained to Lotz about the influence of X-rays on his mind. Then in May 1903, Davies tried to send a long telegram to Joseph Chamberlain, Secretary of State for the Colonies in London, explaining his Royal origins and claiming the throne of England and a multi-million-pound fortune. He also called the police to investigate his neighbour Mr Allen, who he believed was trying to harm him with an X-ray machine. When the police failed to take him seriously, he accused them of being bribed and eventually ordered them off his premises while ‘shouting out at the top of his voice’. Finally, on 14 June 1903 Davies was taken to Fremantle Lunatic Asylum after threatening to shoot his wife.

== The Supreme Court case over Davies’ estate ==
Davies’ wife Kate went to the Supreme Court in Lunacy as plaintiff to try to protect the family's estate. The case was heard from 9 to 18 July 1903, and Davies’ defence counsel E A Harney took the line that Davies had been suffering from a temporary aberration caused by alcoholism, that he was not a danger to others, and was capable of managing his affairs. However, J D Moss (representing Kate Davies) was able to show through a string of medical and other witnesses that Davies was not only insane but was unlikely to recover, was dangerous to others, and was legally incapable.

The acting Master in Lunacy (Charles Allen Sherard) cleared the court on 15 July when Davies was placed on the stand for examination. Moss objected, claiming that he had a special direction that the case was to be heard in an open court, but the Master solved this neatly by adjourning the court while he examined Davies privately with the jury. Moss threatened to walk out; the Master remained unmoved, indicating that he would examine Davies and ‘had no objection to counsel being present’.

Sherard then summed up on 18 July 1903 by instructing the jury that Davies’ 1901 certification was not to be considered valid, as he was then suffering from alcoholism and was found later not to be insane. Sherard also told the jury that the case really began with Davies’ behaviour after his return from England in 1901. The jury, however, were unanimous in finding Davies of unsound mind, but in deference to Sherard's instructions they gave the date of his first insanity as 14 June 1903. The foreman explained to the Master after they presented their finding that ‘he and others of the jury were among Mr Davies’ old friends’, and that they were anxious that he be treated in a private hospital, not the lunatic asylum. The court offered to take this into account, and the jury then delivered its verdict of insanity.

Edward Davies returned to Fremantle Lunatic Asylum, and on 15 August 1903 was ‘discharged to care of his friends’. Nothing more was heard until his death around six months later, on 24 or 25 January 1904 at the Grosvenor Private Hospital. His obituary mentioned only his business successes, his election to public office, and that he died at his residence in Beaconsfield on 25 January after a long illness. He is buried at Fremantle Cemetery.
