= David Symon =

Australian politician

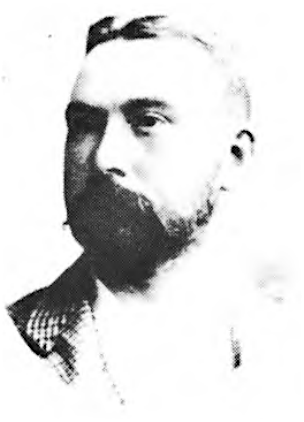

Member of the Legislative Assembly of Western Australia
- In office 28 November 1890 – 13 September 1892
- Preceded by: None (new creation)
- Succeeded by: Elias Solomon
- Constituency: South Fremantle

Personal details
- Born: 12 March 1858 Stirling, Scotland
- Died: 21 March 1924 (aged 65) Chiswick, County of London, England

David Culross Symon (12 March 1858 – 21 March 1924) was a member of the Legislative Assembly of Western Australia from 1890 to 1892, representing the seat of South Fremantle. He was born in Scotland, lived in Australia from 1881 to 1892, and then spent the rest of his life in England.

Symon was born in Stirling, Scotland, to Elizabeth (née Sutherland) and James Symon. His brother, Sir Josiah Symon, was the fourth Attorney-General for Australia. Symon arrived in the Colony of Western Australia in 1881, settling in Fremantle. He initially worked for Harrold Brothers, but later had his own firm, Symon, Hammond, & Hubble. One of his partners was George Hubble, who was also a future MP. At the 1890 general election in Western Australia, the first held for the new Legislative Assembly, Symon was elected to the seat of South Fremantle, unexpectedly defeating a former mayor of Fremantle, Daniel Congdon. However, his time in parliament was short-lived, as in September 1892 he resigned his seat and left for England. Symon took up residence in Chiswick, London, and had a business as a general merchant based in the City of London. He died there in March 1924, aged 65.

== See also ==
- Members of the Western Australian Legislative Assembly, 1890–1894

Parliament of Western Australia
New creation	Member for South Fremantle; 1890–1892	Succeeded by Elias Solomon
