= Arthur Davies (politician) =

Australian politician

Member of the Legislative Assembly of Western Australia
- In office 21 July 1906 – 3 October 1911
- Preceded by: Arthur Diamond
- Succeeded by: Harry Bolton
- Constituency: South Fremantle

Personal details
- Born: 7 May 1867 Fremantle, Western Australia, Australia
- Died: 27 March 1918 (aged 50) Beaconsfield, Western Australia, Australia

Arthur Elvin Davies (7 May 1867 – 27 March 1918) was an Australian businessman and politician who was a member of the Legislative Assembly of Western Australia from 1906 to 1911, representing the seat of South Fremantle.

Davies was born in Fremantle to Hannah Elizabeth (née Williams) and Alfred Alexander Davies. Two of his older brothers, George Alfred and Edward William Davies, served as Mayor of Fremantle. Before entering politics himself, Davies was a cabinet maker and upholsterer who eventually set up as a furniture importer. In November 1889, he also established an undertaking firm. Davies was elected to the Fremantle Road Board (now the City of Cockburn) in 1894, and would serve as mayor from 1905 to 1911. He was elected to parliament at the 1906 South Fremantle by-election, which had been caused by the death of Arthur Diamond. He was re-elected at the 1908 state election, but chose not to contest the 1911 election. Davies died in Beaconsfield in March 1918, aged 50. He had married Margaret Jessie Kilpatrick in 1893, with whom he had three children.

== See also ==
- List of mayors of Cockburn

Parliament of Western Australia
Preceded by Arthur Diamond	Member for South Fremantle; 1906–1911	Succeeded by Harry Bolton
