= Harry Bolton =

Australian politician

Lieutenant Harry Edward Bolton
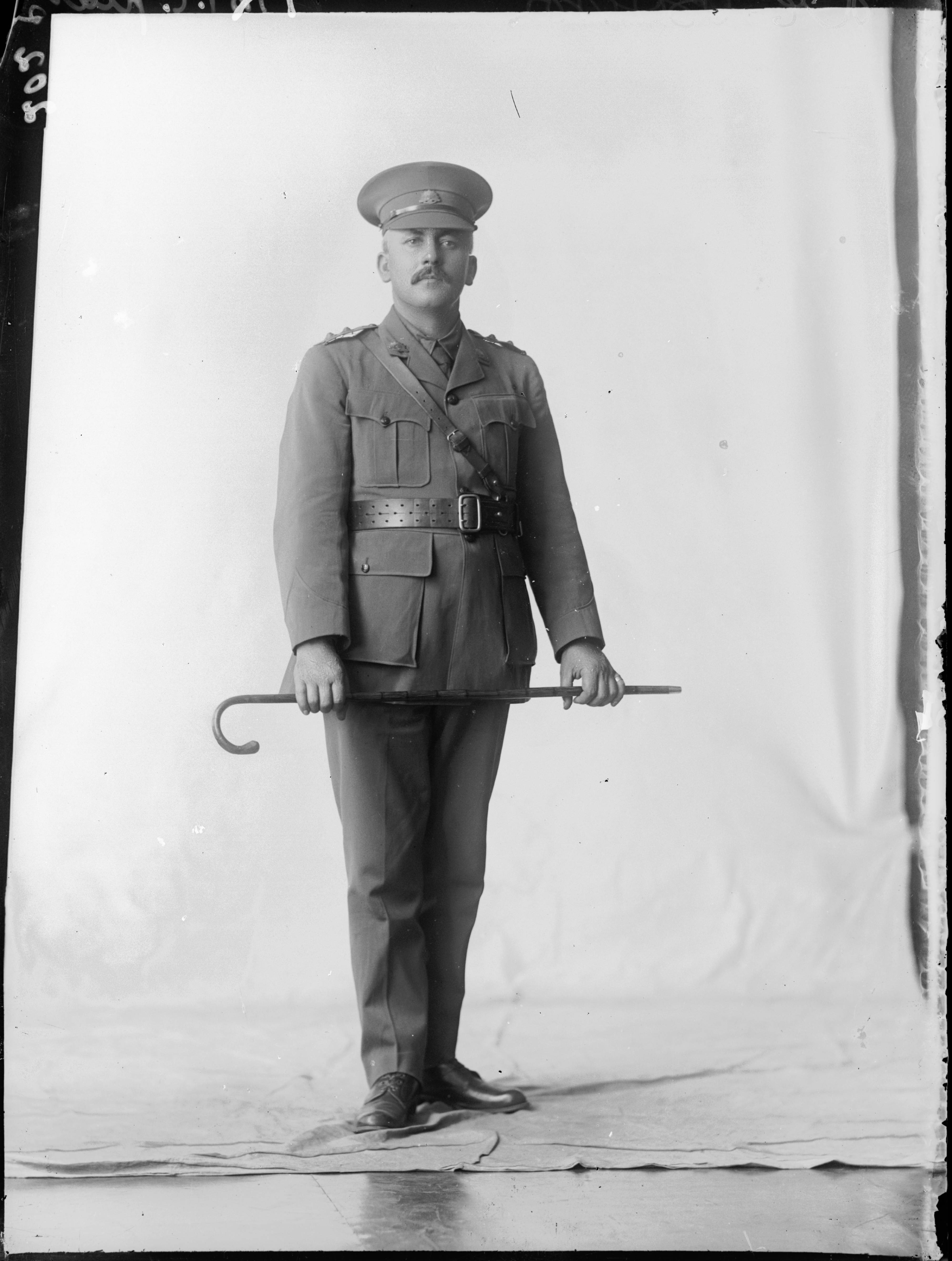
- Portrait of Harry Bolton, 1917

Member of the Legislative Assembly of Western Australia for South Fremantle
- In office 3 October 1911 – 29 September 1917
- Preceded by: Arthur Davies
- Succeeded by: Samuel Rocke

Member of the Legislative Assembly of Western Australia for North Fremantle
- In office 26 June 1904 – 3 October 1911
- Preceded by: John Ferguson
- Succeeded by: Electoral district abolished

Personal details
- Born: 24 December 1870 Peckham, London, United Kingdom
- Died: 18 August 1956 (aged 85) Shenton Park, Western Australia, Australia
- Resting place: Karrakatta Cemetery
- Party: National Labor Party
- Other political affiliations: Labor Party (until 1917)
- Spouse: Alice Matthews (m. 1892; died 1936)
- Children: 5
- Parents: Isaac Bolton (father); Isabelle May Burlington (mother)
- Relatives: Leonard Bolton (brother)

Military service
- Allegiance: Australia
- Branch/service: Australian Army
- Rank: Lieutenant
- Unit: Australian Imperial Force

Harry Edward Bolton (24 December 1870 – 18 August 1956) was an Australian politician. He was a member of the Western Australian Legislative Assembly from 1904 to 1917, as the member for North Fremantle until 1911 and for South Fremantle thereafter. He was initially a member of the Labor Party before joining the National Labor Party after the 1916 conscription split.

== Early life ==
Harry Edward Bolton was born on 24 December 1870 in Peckham, London. He emigrated with his family to Western Australia at the age of 16, arriving on 21 June 1887.

Bolton began working on the railways in 1890 where he became involved in the trade union movement. In 1900, he was elected president of the Enginedrivers', Firemen and Cleaners' Union.

== Political career ==
Bolton stood in the 1904 election for the Legislative Assembly of Western Australia in the North Fremantle electoral district, winning the seat.

In 1906 he raised in parliament allegations against railways commissioner William James George that he had suppressed information on illegal activities of two senior railways officials John T. Short and George Alfred Julius. A royal commission dismissed the allegations. The Premier of Western Australia moved to censure Bolton following the commission's report.

At the 1917 election, Bolton narrowly lost his seat to Samuel Rocke whilst away on active service in France during World War I.

On his return from service in France, Bolton advocated for better treatment of returned servicemen. He was of the opinion that soldiers should have direct representation in parliament and that the existing parties did not adequately serve those who had fought for their country.

He contested the Legislative Council seat of West Province as an independent candidate, advocating for soldiers' rights, in the 1919 by-election, losing to Labor's Alexander Panton.

Bolton stood in the 1922 Australian federal election in the division of Perth, losing to Edward Mann of the Nationalist Party.

== Military career ==
During World War I, Bolton enlisted in the Australian Imperial Force on 23 February 1916 whilst a serving member of parliament serving in the 59th Broad Gauge Railway Operating Company, 3rd Railway Corps. He gained the rank of lieutenant.

In late 1918, it was reported that Bolton was suffering from "disordered action of the heart" and being treated at the 3rd General Wandsworth Military Hospital in London. There was speculation his illness may have been the result of shell shock.

== Personal life ==
On 1 December 1892, Bolton married Alice Matthews at Johnston Memorial Congregation Church in Fremantle. The couple had five children. Alice died in 1936.

His eldest child, Laura Mildred Bolton, died in 1904 at the age of nine.

== Death ==
Bolton died in Shenton Park on 18 August 1956 at the age of 85. He was interred at Karrakatta Cemetery.

Western Australian Legislative Assembly
Preceded by Arthur Davies	Member for South Fremantle; 1911–1917	Succeeded by Samuel Rocke
Preceded by John Ferguson	Member for North Fremantle; 1904–1911	Succeeded by Electoral district abolished
