= Tom Fox (Australian politician) =

Australian politician & football player (1876–1951)

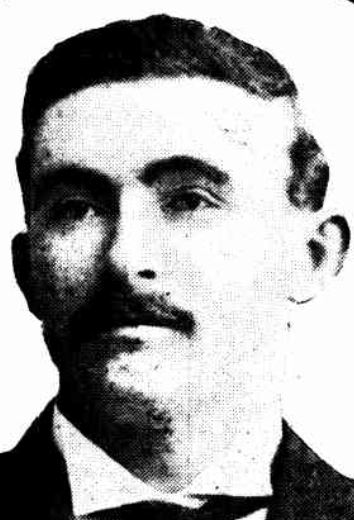

Personal information
- Full name: Thomas Fox
- Born: 3 October 1876; Scarsdale, Victoria
- Died: 20 April 1951 (aged 74); Fremantle, Western Australia
- Original team: Ballarat Imperials
- Height: 175 cm (5 ft 9 in)
- Weight: 75 kg (165 lb)

Playing career^{1}
| Years | Club | Games (Goals) |
| 1902 | Carlton | 10 (7) |
- ^{1} Playing statistics correct to the end of 1902.

Thomas Fox (3 October 1876 – 20 April 1951) was an Australian politician, who was a Member of the Legislative Assembly of Western Australia from 1935 to 1951. Earlier, in 1902, Fox played with Australian rules football club Carlton in the Victorian Football League (VFL).

== Biography ==
Fox was born in Scarsdale, Victoria on 3 October 1876.

By 1903, he had moved to Davyhurst in the Western Australian Goldfields with a friend Frank Bourke where both worked in the mines and played football for Mines Rovers Football Club. He later moved to Boulder where he gained interest in the union movement and the welfare of workers. Following injuries he received as a result of a cave in, and after the birth of his youngest child, he moved to Fremantle and was working as a dockworker.

He became Secretary and President of the Waterside Workers Union prior to his election as the Labor Party candidate for the Western Australian Legislative Assembly, representing South Fremantle in 1935. Fox retained this post until his death in 1951.

Fox was survived by his wife Marion Fox, a son John, and daughters Marion Dwyer and Margaret Jennings.

== Notes ==
Western Australian Legislative Assembly
| Preceded by Alick McCallum | Member for South Fremantle; 1935–1951 | Succeeded by Dick Lawrence |
