= Henry Curran (Australian politician) =

Australian politician

Member of the Legislative Assembly of Western Australia
- In office 12 March 1960 – 31 March 1962
- Preceded by: Dick Lawrence
- Succeeded by: None (seat abolished)
- Constituency: South Fremantle
- In office 31 March 1962 – 23 March 1968
- Preceded by: None (new seat)
- Succeeded by: Don Taylor
- Constituency: Cockburn

Personal details
- Born: 25 January 1912 Stirling, Stirlingshire, Scotland
- Died: 21 October 1975 (aged 63) Nedlands, Western Australia, Australia
- Party: Labor

Henry Curran (25 January 1912 – 21 October 1975) was an Australian politician who was a Labor Party member of the Legislative Assembly of Western Australia from 1960 to 1968.

Curran was born in Stirling, Scotland, to Rosina (née McKenna) and Patrick Curran. He and his parents emigrated to Australia when he was a child. After leaving school, Curran worked for various companies in the Fremantle area, and became involved in the union movement. He also served in the Australian Army during World War II, as a transport driver. Curran entered parliament at the 1960 by-election for the seat of South Fremantle, which had been caused by the death of Dick Lawrence. His seat was abolished at the 1962 state election, and he successfully transferred to the new seat of Cockburn. In 1963, Curran was involved in a traffic accident that resulted in the amputation of a leg. He was re-elected unopposed at the 1965 election, and retired at the 1968 election. Curran died in Perth in 1975, aged 63. He had married Alma Bindley in 1936, with whom he had two children.

Parliament of Western Australia
Preceded by Dick Lawrence	Member for South Fremantle; 1960–1962	Abolished
New seat	Member for Cockburn; 1962–1968	Succeeded by Don Taylor
