= Dick Lawrence =

Australian politician

Phillip Richard Lawrence

Member of the Western Australian Legislative Assembly for South Fremantle
- In office 1951–1960
- Preceded by: Thomas Fox
- Succeeded by: Henry Curran

Personal details
- Born: 24 August 1915
- Died: 25 January 1960 (aged 44)
- Party: Australian Labor Party
- Occupation: Politician

Military service
- Allegiance: Australia
- Branch/service: 2nd AIF
- Battles/wars: Second World War

Phillip Richard Lawrence (24 August 1915 – 25 January 1960) was an Australian politician. He was a Labor member of the Western Australian Legislative Assembly from 1951 to 1960, representing the district of South Fremantle.

He served with the 2nd AIF in North Africa during the Second World War.

Dick Lawrence Oval located in Beaconsfield is named in his honour.

Western Australian Legislative Assembly
Preceded by Thomas Fox	Member for South Fremantle; 1951–1960	Succeeded by Henry Curran
