= Alick McCallum =

Australian politician (1877–1937)

Alexander McCallum

Member of the Western Australian Legislative Assembly
- In office 12 March 1921 – 16 March 1935
- Preceded by: Samuel Rocke
- Succeeded by: Tom Fox
- Constituency: South Fremantle

Personal details
- Born: 28 October 1877 Adelaide, South Australia, Australia
- Died: 27 March 1917 (aged 49) Fremantle, Western Australia, Australia
- Spouse: Elizabeth Ferres (m. 1902)
- Occupation: Bookbinder

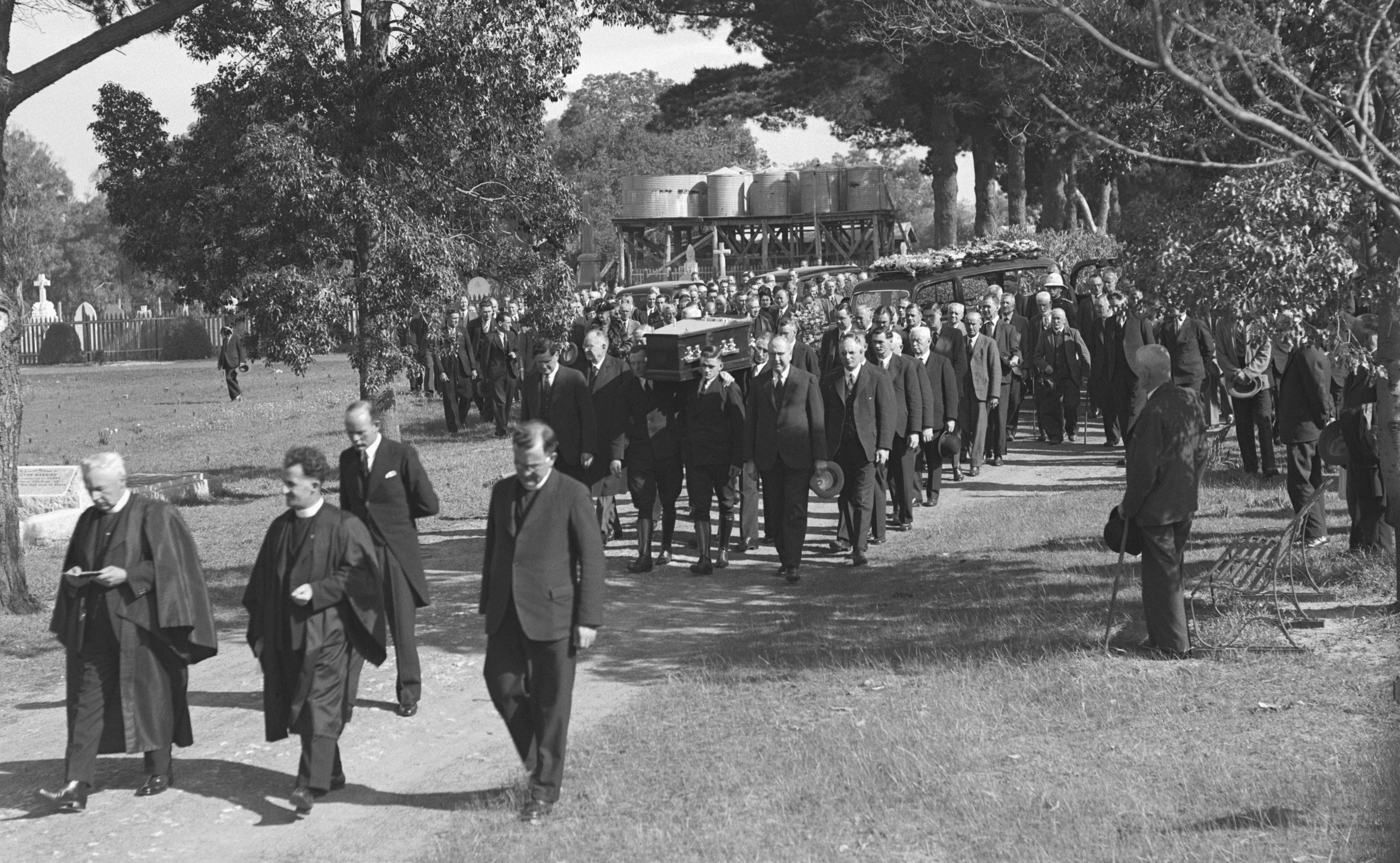
Alexander (Alick) McCallum's state funeral en route to Fremantle Cemetery

Alexander McCallum (28 October 1877 – 12 July 1937) was an Australian politician. He was the Labor member for South Fremantle in the Western Australian Legislative Assembly from 1921 to 1935. He was Minister for Works from 1924 to 1930. From 1933 to 1935 he was Deputy Premier of Western Australia and Minister for Public Works and Labour. He also represented the South Fremantle Football Club in the Western Australian National Football League in one match during the 1904 season.

In December 1924 a strike was instigated by the Seamen's Union.

While the media viewed the union leader Thomas Fox with cynicism, McCallum was considered a moderate around the issue who is able to see both points of view of the conflict.

== Early life ==
McCallum was born on 28 October 1877 in Thebarton, South Australia. He was the son of Margaret (née McPhee) and Hugh McCallum; his father worked as a labourer.

McCallum was raised on his parents' farm in Thebarton. He attended public schools until the age of twelve, when he began working at a printer's office. He was briefly indentured to a harness-maker, then at the age of fourteen was apprenticed to a bookbinder. He also volunteered for military service in South Australia's colonial forces as a member of the infantry militia.

McCallum completed his apprenticeship with the firm of E. S. Wigg & Son and in 1898 transferred to work in the company's Perth branch. He left Wigg & Son in 1900 and began working for the Government Printing Office. He was also a talented sportsman, competing in running races and playing with the South Fremantle and West Perth Football Clubs in the West Australian Football League.

Western Australian Legislative Assembly
Preceded by Samuel Rocke	Member for South Fremantle; 1922–1935	Succeeded by Thomas Fox
