= Daniel Keen Congdon =

Australian politician

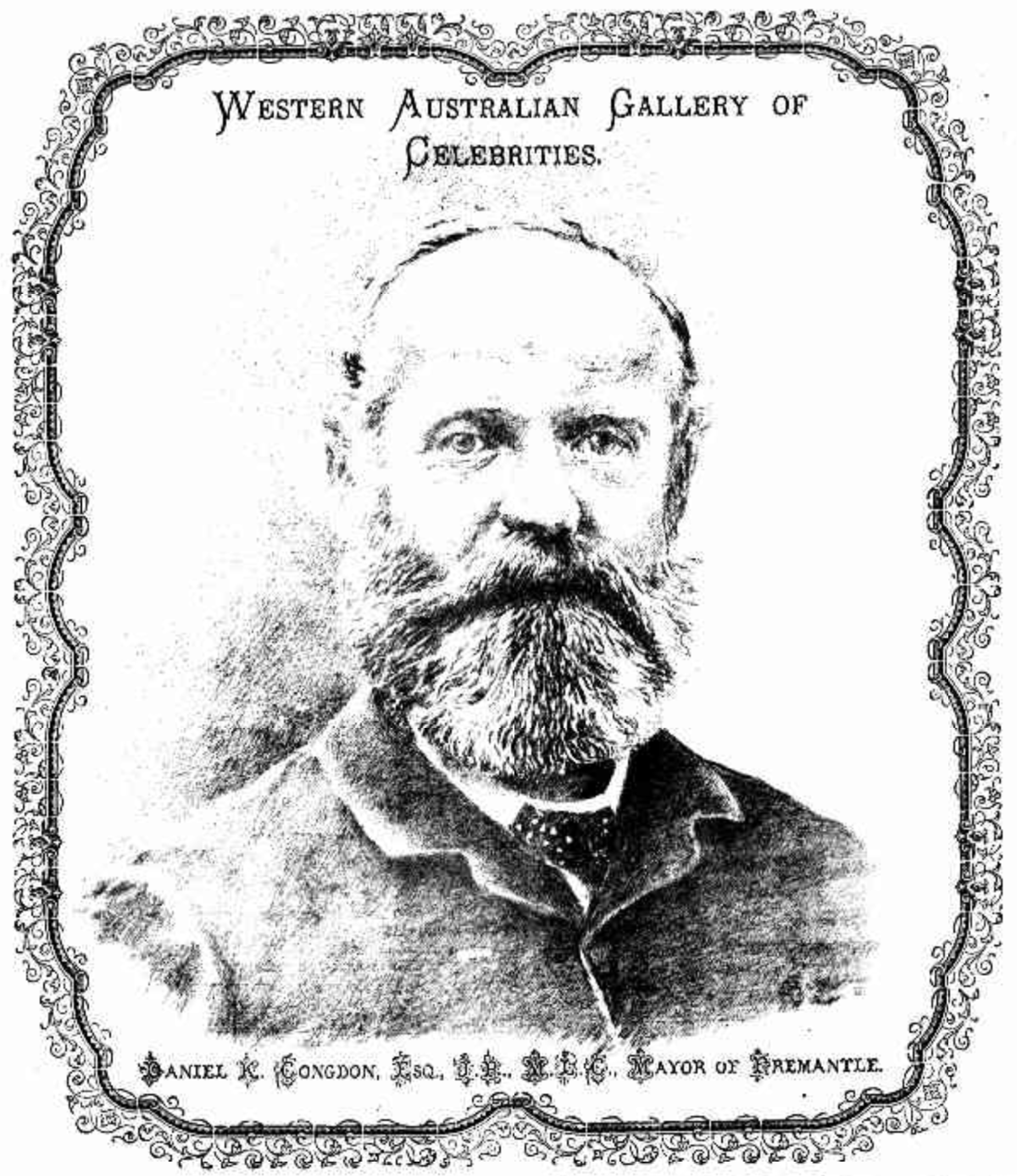

Mayor of the Municipality of Fremantle
- In office 1886–1888, 1891

Member of the Western Australian Legislative Council
- In office 1892–1900

Personal details
- Born: August 1836 Chatham, Kent, England
- Died: 17 January 1907 (aged 70) Sydney, Australia

Daniel Keen Congdon (August 1836 – 17 January 1907) was the mayor of the Municipality of Fremantle in Western Australia from 1886 to 1888.

== Biography ==
Daniel Keen Congdon was born in August 1836 in Chatham, Kent, to William John and Sarah Ann née Scott. Congdon migrated to Western Australia with his parents from Kent in 1853. His father was a pharmacist and worked for the Western Australian Penal Department. On 22 December 1861 he married Jane Ainslie née Fairbairn. They had thirteen children (eight boys and five girls). In 1885 he was elected the mayor of the Municipality of Fremantle, a position in which he served for three years. He was re-elected as mayor in 1891. He was subsequently elected unanimously as the inaugural mayor of North Fremantle.

He was a member of the Western Australian Legislative Council from 1892 to 1900.

He died on 17 January 1907, while travelling to Sydney to visit his sick son (who died before the father arrived). The bodies of both men were returned to Western Australia (on TSS Kanowna), and buried on 10 February in an Anglican section of Karrakatta Cemetery.
