= Arthur Diamond =

Australian businessperson and politician

Member of the Legislative Assembly of Western Australia
- In office 24 April 1901 – 22 June 1906
- Preceded by: Elias Solomon
- Succeeded by: Arthur Davies
- Constituency: South Fremantle

Personal details
- Born: c. 1844 Derry, Ireland
- Died: June 22, 1906 (aged 59) Fremantle, Western Australia, Australia

Arthur James Diamond (c. 1844 – 22 June 1906) was an Australian businessman and politician who was a member of the Legislative Assembly of Western Australia from 1901 until his death, representing the seat of South Fremantle.

Diamond was born in Derry, Ireland. He came to Australia in 1867, initially living in Victoria and then going to South Australia. Diamond settled in Adelaide, where he developed broad commercial interests, including the manufacture of jewellery. In 1878, he helped to found the Norwood Football Club, an Australian rules football club, subsequently serving as club secretary and treasurer. In 1883, Diamond served as president of the South Australian Football Association. Diamond moved to Fremantle, Western Australia, in 1886, and maintained his link with football, becoming president of the Fremantle Football Club in 1890. He was also vice-president of the West Australian Football Association in 1896.

In Fremantle, Diamond's business interests focused on his customs and shipping agency, but he also branched out into the wholesale liquor trade. A former president of the Fremantle Lumpers Union, he stood for the seat of Fremantle at the 1894 general election and the 1896 by-election, but was defeated both times (by William Marmion and John Higham, respectively). Diamond was eventually elected to parliament at the 1901 general election, replacing the retiring Elias Solomon as the member for South Fremantle. He initially sat in parliament as an independent, but in 1904 joined the Ministerialist faction, which had future premier Hector Rason as its leader. Diamond was re-elected at the 1904 and 1905 elections. However, in April 1906, he suffered a paralytic stroke and cerebral haemorrhage, which led to his death two months later. He was 59. Diamond had married Ellen Louisa Goldeney in 1868, with whom he had three sons and a daughter.

Parliament of Western Australia
Preceded by Elias Solomon	Member for South Fremantle; 1901–1906	Succeeded by Arthur Davies
