= Electoral district of South Fremantle =

Former electoral district of Western Australia

South Fremantle Western Australia—Legislative Assembly
- State: Western Australia
- Dates current: 1890–1962
- Namesake: South Fremantle

South Fremantle was an electoral district of the Legislative Assembly in the Australian state of Western Australia from 1890 to 1962.

Based in urban South Fremantle, the district was one of the original 30 seats contested at the 1890 election. When the district was abolished at the 1962 election, its member at the time, Henry Curran of the Labor Party, transferred to the new seat of Cockburn.

== Members ==
| Member | Party | Term |
|---|---|---|
| David Symon | Non-aligned | 1890–1892 |
| Elias Solomon | Independent | 1892–1901 |
| Arthur Diamond | Independent | 1901–1904 |
| Arthur Diamond | Ministerial | 1904–1906 |
| Arthur Davies | Ministerial | 1906–1911 |
| Harry Bolton | Labor | 1911–1917 |
| Harry Bolton | National Labor | 1917 |
| Samuel Rocke | Ind. Labor | 1917–1921 |
| Alick McCallum | Labor | 1921–1935 |
| Thomas Fox | Labor | 1935–1951 |
| Dick Lawrence | Labor | 1951–1960 |
| Henry Curran | Labor | 1960–1962 |
