= Elias Solomon =

Australian politician (1839–1909)

The Honourable Elias Solomon
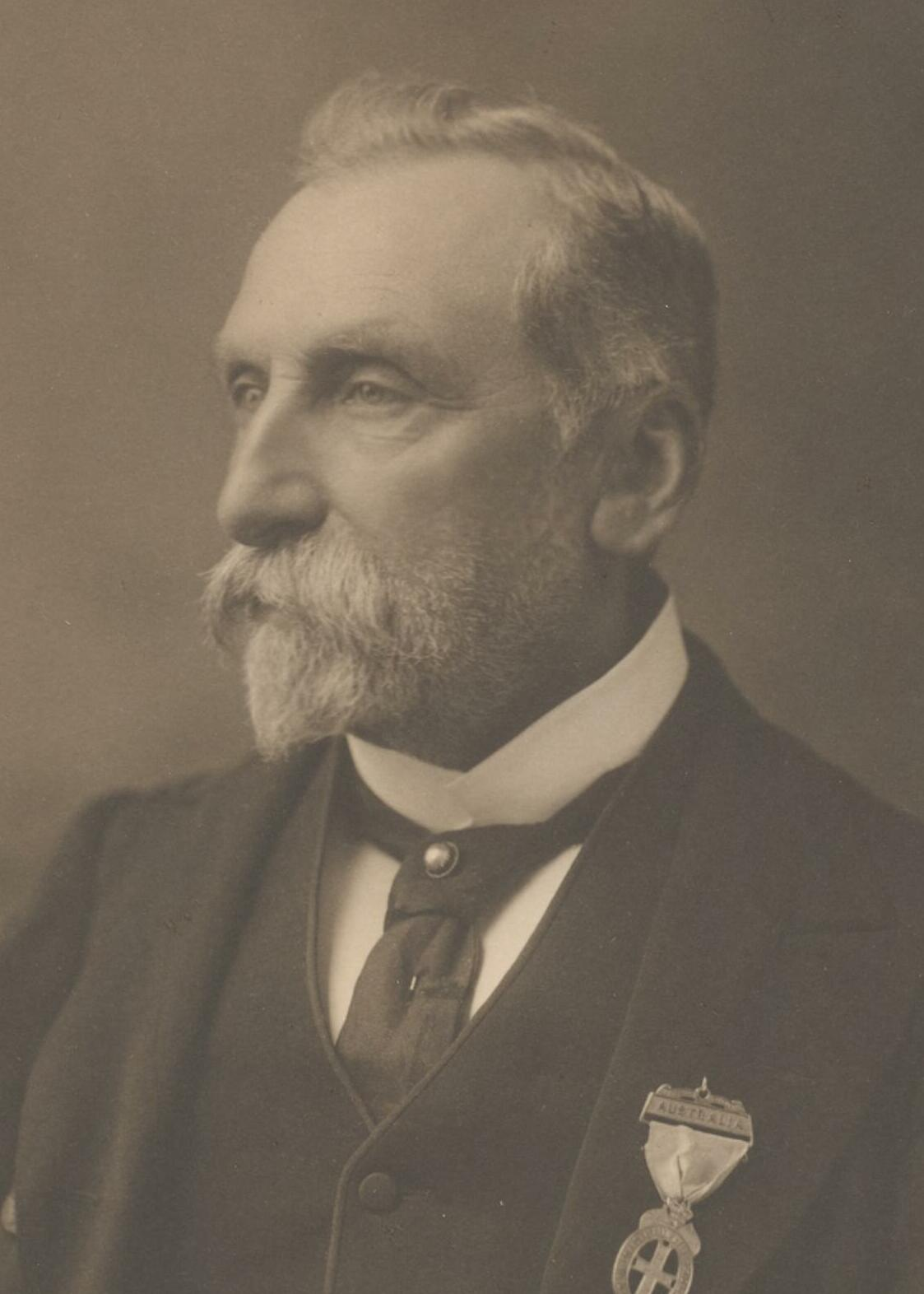

Member of the Australian Parliament for Fremantle
- In office 29 March 1901 – 16 December 1903
- Preceded by: New seat
- Succeeded by: William Carpenter

Member of the Western Australian Legislative Assembly for South Fremantle
- In office 14 October 1892 – 29 March 1901
- Preceded by: David Symon
- Succeeded by: Arthur Diamond

Mayor of Fremantle
- In office 1881–1881
- Preceded by: Edward Higham
- Succeeded by: Edward Higham

Councillor of the Town of Fremantle
- In office 1877–1881

Personal details
- Born: 2 September 1839 London, England
- Died: 23 May 1909 (aged 69) Beaconsfield, Western Australia, Australia
- Party: Free Trade Party
- Parent(s): Leah (née Myers) and Moss Solomon
- Occupation: Clerk

Elias Solomon (2 September 1839 – 23 May 1909) was an Australian politician based in Fremantle. He was Mayor of Fremantle, MLA for South Fremantle, and the first Member for Fremantle in the Australian House of Representatives.

== Early life ==
Solomon was born in London, England to Leah and Moss Solomon and migrated to Australia as a child, living at first in Sydney and then Adelaide. His uncle Emanuel Solomon owned the Queen's Theatre in Adelaide, and Solomon's father Moss was for a short while made manager. The family returned to Sydney until Moss' death in 1849 when Leah again moved to Adelaide and Solomon was educated at Adelaide Educational Institution.

== Career ==
After finishing school, Solomon joined another of his uncle's business concerns and in 1857 was sent to Mauritius to purchase goods. On his return, he worked for the firm of Solomon and Salom in Adelaide, and also Falk and Co. of Melbourne.

At the age of 29 Solomon headed west to Fremantle in Western Australia, arriving on 20 January 1868 aboard Eliza Blanche and initially living in Henry Street. Soon the same year he was joined by two of his nephews and together then formed Solomon & Nephews, Auctioneers and Agents of which Solomon was clerk and auctioneer. This venture was part-financed by his half-brother Judah Moss Solomon (of Melbourne) and brother-in-law Isaac Solomon (of Adelaide).

The weight of conducting business in a depressed economic environment bore on Solomon, and this was not helped by his nephews being active members of Fremantle's Amateur Dramatics Company, performing at the Oddfellows in William Street. He wrote to them in July 1869: "…that you may not be under any misunderstanding with regard to my present dissatisfaction, I will be more explicit. You have taken up time belonging to the firm in Amateur Theatrical matters which, I believe, is acting prejudiciously to the business…"

In 1881 he was elected to the Fremantle City Council. In 1892, he was elected to the Western Australian Legislative Assembly as the member for South Fremantle, where he remained until 1901. In that year, he transferred to federal politics, winning the Australian House of Representatives seat of Fremantle for the Free Trade Party. He was defeated by Labor's William Carpenter in 1903. Solomon died in 1909. Solomon was at one time head of the Fremantle Cemetery board, which is where he is buried.

== Ocean View residence ==
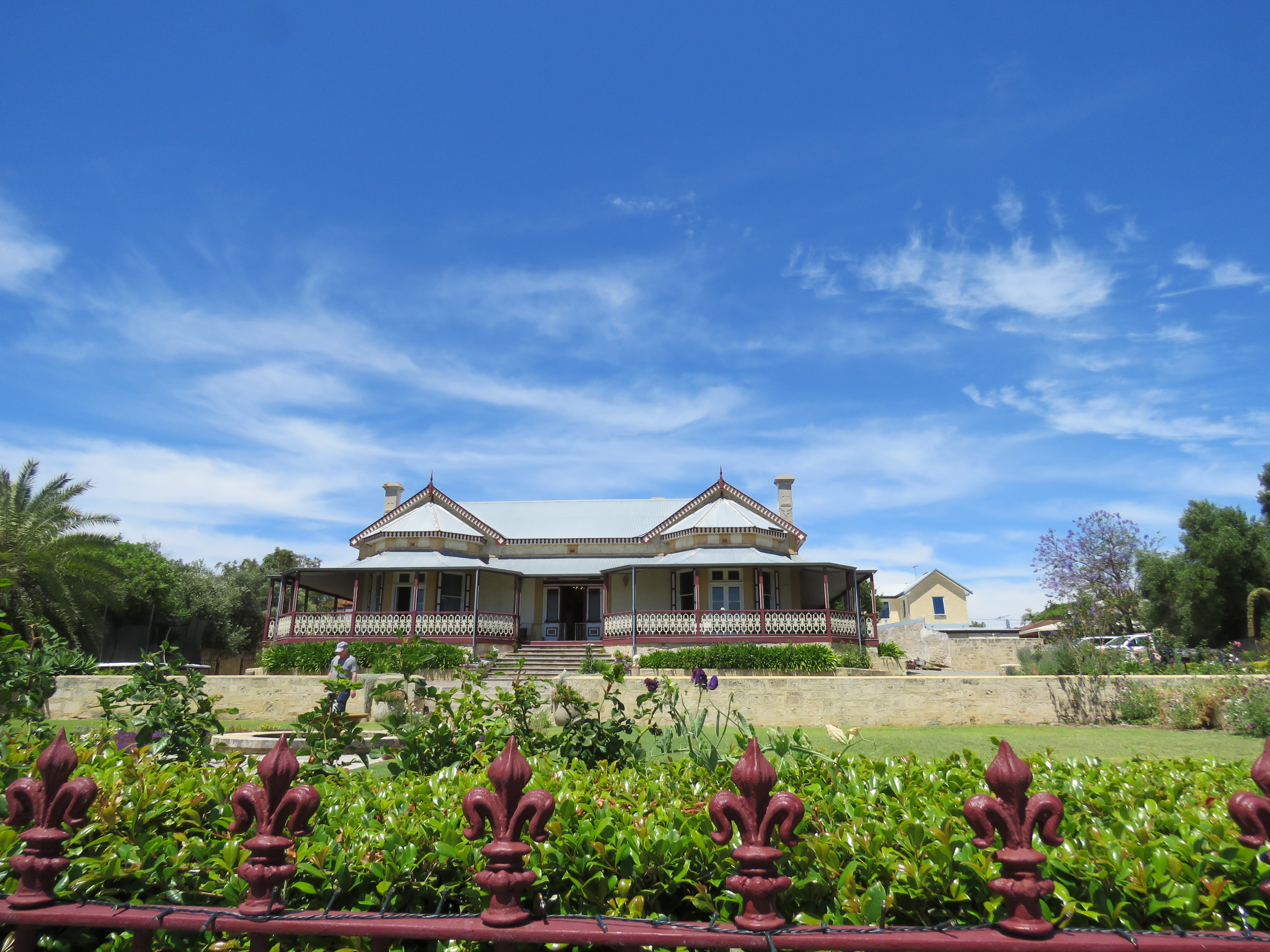
Ocean View, his residence built in 1887

Solomon's residence, Ocean View at 134 Solomon Street, Beaconsfield, was completed in 1887 in the Victorian Regency style. After his death it served as military hospital during World War One, until 1917, and as a maternity hospital in the years between the wars. It now has reverted to a private residence again and is heritage listed. Solomon Street was renamed from Mary Street in the 1950s to commemorate Elias Solomon.

== Family ==
Solomon was married twice, firstly to Agnes Elizabeth Bickley (c. 1846 – 22 April 1886), the daughter of Wallace Bickley. After Agnes' death he re-married to Elizabeth Stokes (16 September 1868 – 3 December 1898) on 1 May 1887. They had five children.

Samuel Moss Solomon c. 1769 – 1842
Moss Solomon; 1796–1849	Leah Myers	Emanuel Solomon; 1800–1873	Vaiben Solomon; 1798–1860
Agnes Elizabeth Bickley c. 1846 – 1886	Elias Solomon; 1839–1909	Elizabeth Stokes; 1868–1898	Isabella	Rose	Other children unknown
Wallace Elias Bickley Solomon; 1878–1950	Maurice Elias Solomon; 1888–1977	3 other children

- Wallace Elias Bickley Solomon (1878–1950) was the first secretary, and honorary solicitor, of the Royal Western Australian Historical Society in 1926.
- Maurice Elias Solomon (1888–1977), lawyer and councillor of the City of Fremantle.

== See also ==
- List of notable descendants of Samuel Moss Solomon

Western Australian Legislative Assembly
Preceded by David Symon	Member for South Fremantle; 1892–1901	Succeeded by Arthur Diamond
Parliament of Australia
Preceded by New seat	Member for Fremantle; 1901 – 1903	Succeeded by William Carpenter
