= Electoral results for the district of Albany =

Electoral district of Albany, Western Australia results

This is a list of electoral results for the electoral district of Albany in Western Australian state elections.

== Members for Albany ==
| Member | Party | Term |
|---|---|---|
| Lancel de Hamel | Oppositionist | 1890–1894 |
| George Leake | Oppositionist | 1894–1900 |
| John Hassell | Oppositionist | 1900–1901 |
| James Gardiner | Oppositionist | 1901–1904 |
| Charles Keyser | Labor | 1904–1905 |
| Charles Keyser | Ministerialist | 1905 |
| Edward Barnett | Ministerialist | 1905–1909 |
| William Price | Labor | 1909–1917 |
| Herbert Robinson | Nationalist | 1917–1919 |
| John Scaddan | Nationalist | 1919–1920 |
| John Scaddan | Country | 1920–1923 |
| John Scaddan | Country (MCP) | 1923–1924 |
| Arthur Wansbrough | Labor | 1924–1936 |
| Leonard Hill | Country | 1936–1956 |
| Jack Hall | Labor | 1956–1970 |
| Wyndham Cook | Labor | 1970–1974 |
| Leon Watt | Liberal | 1974–1993 |
| Kevin Prince | Liberal | 1993–2001 |
| Peter Watson | Labor | 2001–2021 |
| Rebecca Stephens | Labor | 2021–2025 |
| Scott Leary | National | 2025–present |

== Election results ==
=== Elections in the 2020s ===
2025 Western Australian state election: Albany
| Party | Candidate | Votes | % | ±% |
|---|---|---|---|---|
| Labor | Rebecca Stephens | 8,825 | 29.9 | −18.8 |
| National | Scott Leary | 6,496 | 22.0 | +7.4 |
| Liberal | Tom Brough | 6,451 | 21.8 | +4.8 |
| Greens | Lynn Maclaren | 2,348 | 7.9 | +2.4 |
| Independent | Mario Lionetti | 2,121 | 7.2 | +7.2 |
| Christians | Gerrit Ballast | 1,504 | 5.1 | +0.4 |
| One Nation | Quintin Bisschoff | 813 | 2.8 | +0.2 |
| Legalise Cannabis | Philip Arnatt | 693 | 2.3 | +0.5 |
| Shooters, Fishers, Farmers | Synjon Anstee-Brook | 311 | 1.1 | −1.3 |
| Total formal votes | | 29,562 | 96.6 | −0.0 |
| Informal votes | | 1,050 | 3.4 | +0.0 |
| Turnout | | 30,612 | 90.4 | +5.2 |
Two-candidate-preferred result
| National | Scott Leary | 16,615 | 56.3 | +56.3 |
| Labor | Rebecca Stephens | 12,914 | 43.7 | −17.3 |
| National gain from Labor | | | | |

Results are not final. Last updated on 25 March 2025 at 7:00 PM AWST

2021 Western Australian state election: Albany
| Party | Candidate | Votes | % | ±% |
|---|---|---|---|---|
| Labor | Rebecca Stephens | 11,804 | 50.8 | +6.2 |
| Liberal | Scott Leary | 4,236 | 18.2 | +0.9 |
| National | Delma Baesjou | 2,480 | 10.7 | −9.0 |
| Greens | Nelson Gilmour | 1,310 | 5.6 | −1.0 |
| Christians | Ian 't Hart | 1,246 | 5.4 | +0.3 |
| One Nation | Michelle Kinsella | 602 | 2.6 | −4.2 |
| Shooters, Fishers, Farmers | Karrie Louden | 459 | 2.0 | +2.0 |
| Legalise Cannabis | Caroline Cull | 417 | 1.8 | +1.8 |
| No Mandatory Vaccination | Sandra Madeo | 325 | 1.4 | +1.4 |
| Liberal Democrats | Malcolm Dodson | 170 | 0.7 | +0.7 |
| Sustainable Australia | Barry Purcell | 143 | 0.6 | +0.6 |
| WAxit | Emil Bacanaru | 47 | 0.2 | +0.2 |
| Total formal votes | | 23,239 | 96.7 | +0.1 |
| Informal votes | | 799 | 3.3 | −0.1 |
| Turnout | | 24,038 | 87.5 | −1.8 |
Two-party-preferred result
| Labor | Rebecca Stephens | 14,780 | 63.7 | +7.8 |
| Liberal | Scott Leary | 8,432 | 36.3 | +36.3 |
| Labor hold | | | | |

=== Elections in the 2010s ===
2017 Western Australian state election: Albany
| Party | Candidate | Votes | % | ±% |
|---|---|---|---|---|
| Labor | Peter Watson | 10,349 | 43.9 | +5.5 |
| National | Robert Sutton | 4,750 | 20.1 | −2.0 |
| Liberal | Greg Stocks | 4,149 | 17.6 | −10.9 |
| One Nation | Anthony Griffiths | 1,624 | 6.9 | +6.9 |
| Greens | David Rastrick | 1,547 | 6.6 | +1.2 |
| Christians | Ian 't Hart | 1,167 | 4.9 | +1.1 |
| Total formal votes | | 23,586 | 96.6 | +0.4 |
| Informal votes | | 838 | 3.4 | −0.4 |
| Turnout | | 24,424 | 90.0 | −0.0 |
Two-party-preferred result
| Labor | Peter Watson | 12,988 | 55.1 | +4.1 |
| National | Robert Sutton | 10,585 | 44.9 | +44.9 |
| Labor hold | | Swing | +4.1 | |

2013 Western Australian state election: Albany
| Party | Candidate | Votes | % | ±% |
|---|---|---|---|---|
| Labor | Peter Watson | 8,284 | 39.3 | +0.2 |
| Liberal | Trevor Cosh | 6,061 | 28.8 | –4.1 |
| National | Robert Sutton | 4,357 | 20.7 | +7.4 |
| Greens | Diane Evers | 1,137 | 5.4 | –2.2 |
| Christians | Hans Vermeulen | 831 | 3.9 | –0.9 |
| Family First | Barry Critchison | 386 | 1.8 | –0.4 |
| Total formal votes | | 21,056 | 96.2 | –0.9 |
| Informal votes | | 828 | 3.8 | +0.9 |
| Turnout | | 21,884 | 92.8 | +2.7 |
Two-party-preferred result
| Labor | Peter Watson | 10,957 | 52.0 | +1.8 |
| Liberal | Trevor Cosh | 10,094 | 48.0 | –1.8 |
| Labor hold | | Swing | +1.8 | |

=== Elections in the 2000s ===
2008 Western Australian state election: Albany
| Party | Candidate | Votes | % | ±% |
|---|---|---|---|---|
| Labor | Peter Watson | 7,709 | 39.14 | +2.5 |
| Liberal | Andrew Partington | 6,486 | 32.93 | −2.7 |
| National | Sam Harma | 2,628 | 13.34 | +5.2 |
| Greens | Diane Evers | 1,492 | 7.58 | +1.7 |
| Christian Democrats | Justin Moseley | 950 | 4.82 | +0.8 |
| Family First | Colin Pyle | 431 | 2.19 | −0.7 |
| Total formal votes | | 19,696 | 97.09 | +1.30 |
| Informal votes | | 590 | 2.91 | −1.30 |
| Turnout | | 20,286 | 90.13 | |
Two-party-preferred result
| Labor | Peter Watson | 9,884 | 50.23 | +2.5 |
| Liberal | Andrew Partington | 9,795 | 49.77 | –2.5 |
| Labor gain from Liberal | | Swing | +2.5 | |

2005 Western Australian state election: Albany
| Party | Candidate | Votes | % | ±% |
|---|---|---|---|---|
| Labor | Peter Watson | 5,569 | 43.6 | +12.0 |
| Liberal | Andrew Partington | 4,773 | 37.3 | +4.3 |
| National | Beverley Ford | 651 | 5.1 | +5.1 |
| Greens | Tony Evers | 629 | 4.9 | −3.5 |
| Christian Democrats | Greg Basden | 453 | 3.5 | +3.5 |
| Family First | Colin Pyle | 371 | 2.9 | +2.9 |
| One Nation | Brian Burns | 340 | 2.7 | −13.6 |
| Total formal votes | | 12,786 | 95.8 | +0.1 |
| Informal votes | | 561 | 4.2 | −0.1 |
| Turnout | | 13,347 | 91.6 | |
Two-party-preferred result
| Labor | Peter Watson | 6,564 | 51.4 | −2.3 |
| Liberal | Andrew Partington | 6,206 | 48.6 | +2.3 |
| Labor hold | | Swing | −2.3 | |

2001 Western Australian state election: Albany
| Party | Candidate | Votes | % | ±% |
|---|---|---|---|---|
| Liberal | Kevin Prince | 4,141 | 33.0 | −24.9 |
| Labor | Peter Watson | 3,960 | 31.6 | −2.2 |
| One Nation | Darrall Simpson | 2,035 | 16.2 | +16.2 |
| Greens | Sandy Davis | 1,060 | 8.5 | +8.5 |
| Liberals for Forests | Diane Evers | 1,001 | 8.0 | +8.0 |
| Curtin Labor Alliance | John Watson | 334 | 2.7 | +2.7 |
| Total formal votes | | 12,531 | 95.7 | +0.3 |
| Informal votes | | 561 | 4.3 | −0.3 |
| Turnout | | 13,092 | 91.8 | |
Two-party-preferred result
| Labor | Peter Watson | 6,660 | 53.7 | +15.6 |
| Liberal | Kevin Prince | 5,748 | 46.3 | −15.6 |
| Labor gain from Liberal | | Swing | +15.6 | |

=== Elections in the 1990s ===
1996 Western Australian state election: Albany
| Party | Candidate | Votes | % | ±% |
|---|---|---|---|---|
| Liberal | Kevin Prince | 6,649 | 57.9 | +25.7 |
| Labor | Matt Benson-Lidholm | 3,873 | 33.8 | +3.7 |
| CALM Resistance Movement | Rob Moir | 952 | 8.3 | +6.6 |
| Total formal votes | | 11,474 | 95.4 | +0.0 |
| Informal votes | | 550 | 4.6 | −0.0 |
| Turnout | | 12,024 | 92.3 | |
Two-party-preferred result
| Liberal | Kevin Prince | 7,096 | 61.9 | +1.1 |
| Labor | Matt Benson-Lidholm | 4,368 | 38.1 | −1.1 |
| Liberal hold | | Swing | +1.1 | |

1993 Western Australian state election: Albany
| Party | Candidate | Votes | % | ±% |
|---|---|---|---|---|
| Liberal | Kevin Prince | 3,334 | 32.7 | −14.9 |
| Labor | Ursula Richards | 3,101 | 30.4 | −6.5 |
| National | Malcolm Cameron | 2,789 | 27.4 | +11.9 |
| Democrats | Roland Paver | 297 | 2.9 | +2.9 |
| Independent | Drew Posthuma | 247 | 2.4 | +2.4 |
| Independent | Robert Howard | 235 | 2.3 | +2.3 |
| CALM Resistance Movement | Alf Sharp | 184 | 1.8 | +1.8 |
| Total formal votes | | 10,187 | 95.4 | +1.8 |
| Informal votes | | 492 | 4.6 | −1.8 |
| Turnout | | 10,679 | 94.6 | +1.8 |
Two-party-preferred result
| Liberal | Kevin Prince | 6,108 | 60.0 | −0.1 |
| Labor | Ursula Richards | 4,079 | 40.0 | +0.1 |
| Liberal hold | | Swing | −0.1 | |

=== Elections in the 1980s ===
1989 Western Australian state election: Albany
| Party | Candidate | Votes | % | ±% |
|---|---|---|---|---|
| Liberal | Leon Watt | 4,566 | 47.6 | −5.7 |
| Labor | Brian Bradley | 3,540 | 36.9 | −9.8 |
| National | Michael Jardine | 1,487 | 15.5 | +15.5 |
| Total formal votes | | 9,593 | 93.6 | |
| Informal votes | | 657 | 6.4 | |
| Turnout | | 10,250 | 92.8 | |
Two-party-preferred result
| Liberal | Leon Watt | 5,769 | 60.1 | +6.8 |
| Labor | Brian Bradley | 3,824 | 39.9 | −6.8 |
| Liberal hold | | Swing | +6.8 | |

1986 Western Australian state election: Albany
| Party | Candidate | Votes | % | ±% |
|---|---|---|---|---|
| Liberal | Leon Watt | 4,510 | 53.3 | +10.8 |
| Labor | Josephine Lynch | 3,947 | 46.7 | +2.1 |
| Total formal votes | | 8,457 | 98.1 | +0.7 |
| Informal votes | | 165 | 1.9 | −0.7 |
| Turnout | | 8,622 | 93.6 | +2.9 |
| Liberal hold | | Swing | +1.0 | |

1983 Western Australian state election: Albany
| Party | Candidate | Votes | % | ±% |
|---|---|---|---|---|
| Labor | Josephine Lynch | 3,370 | 44.6 | |
| Liberal | Leon Watt | 3,210 | 42.5 | |
| National Country | Darrall Simpson | 691 | 9.1 | |
| Democrats | John Chamberlain | 286 | 3.8 | |
| Total formal votes | | 7,557 | 97.4 | |
| Informal votes | | 203 | 2.6 | |
| Turnout | | 7,760 | 90.7 | |
Two-party-preferred result
| Liberal | Leon Watt | 3,949 | 52.3 | |
| Labor | Josephine Lynch | 3,608 | 47.7 | |
| Liberal hold | | Swing | | |

1980 Western Australian state election: Albany
| Party | Candidate | Votes | % | ±% |
|---|---|---|---|---|
| Liberal | Leon Watt | 4,236 | 57.7 | −5.2 |
| Labor | Ronald Bowe | 2,606 | 35.5 | −1.6 |
| Progress | Douglas Joyce | 500 | 6.8 | +6.8 |
| Total formal votes | | 7,342 | 96.5 | −1.0 |
| Informal votes | | 265 | 3.5 | +1.0 |
| Turnout | | 7,607 | 91.2 | −2.0 |
Two-party-preferred result
| Liberal | Leon Watt | 4,586 | 62.5 | −0.4 |
| Labor | Ronald Bowe | 2,756 | 37.5 | +0.4 |
| Liberal hold | | Swing | −0.4 | |

=== Elections in the 1970s ===
1977 Western Australian state election: Albany
| Party | Candidate | Votes | % | ±% |
|---|---|---|---|---|
| Liberal | Leon Watt | 4,592 | 62.9 | |
| Labor | Ray Wood | 2,704 | 37.1 | |
| Total formal votes | | 7,296 | 97.5 | |
| Informal votes | | 185 | 2.5 | |
| Turnout | | 7,481 | 93.2 | |
| Liberal hold | | Swing | | |

1974 Western Australian state election: Albany
| Party | Candidate | Votes | % | ±% |
|---|---|---|---|---|
| Labor | Wyndham Cook | 3,075 | 44.5 | |
| Liberal | Leon Watt | 2,726 | 39.4 | |
| National Alliance | Leslie Dean | 1,111 | 16.1 | |
| Total formal votes | | 6,912 | 96.6 | |
| Informal votes | | 244 | 3.4 | |
| Turnout | | 7,156 | 91.8 | |
Two-party-preferred result
| Liberal | Leon Watt | 3,667 | 53.0 | |
| Labor | Wyndham Cook | 3,245 | 47.0 | |
| Liberal gain from Labor | | Swing | | |

1971 Western Australian state election: Albany
| Party | Candidate | Votes | % | ±% |
|---|---|---|---|---|
| Labor | Wyndham Cook | 3,305 | 54.0 | −1.4 |
| Liberal | George Formby | 2,368 | 38.7 | −5.9 |
| Democratic Labor | Peter Cameron | 449 | 7.3 | +7.3 |
| Total formal votes | | 6,122 | 97.6 | −1.2 |
| Informal votes | | 151 | 2.4 | +1.2 |
| Turnout | | 6,273 | 95.1 | +1.7 |
Two-party-preferred result
| Labor | Wyndham Cook | 3,372 | 55.1 | −0.3 |
| Liberal | George Formby | 2,750 | 44.9 | +0.3 |
| Labor hold | | Swing | −0.3 | |

1970 Albany state by-election
| Party | Candidate | Votes | % | ±% |
|---|---|---|---|---|
| Labor | Wyndham Cook | 2,538 | 47.7 | −7.7 |
| Liberal | George Formby | 2,080 | 39.0 | −5.6 |
| Independent Liberal | Henry Ayers | 529 | 9.9 | +9.9 |
| Independent | Brian Burns | 179 | 3.4 | +3.4 |
| Total formal votes | | 5,326 | 98.6 | −0.2 |
| Informal votes | | 77 | 1.4 | +0.2 |
| Turnout | | 5,403 | 88.5 | −4.9 |
Two-party-preferred result
| Labor | Wyndham Cook | 2,782 | 52.2 | −3.2 |
| Liberal | George Formby | 2,544 | 47.8 | +3.2 |
| Labor hold | | Swing | −3.2 | |

=== Elections in the 1960s ===
1968 Western Australian state election: Albany
| Party | Candidate | Votes | % | ±% |
|---|---|---|---|---|
| Labor | Jack Hall | 2,958 | 55.4 | |
| Liberal and Country | Henry Ayers | 2,386 | 44.6 | |
| Total formal votes | | 5,344 | 98.8 | |
| Informal votes | | 65 | 1.2 | |
| Turnout | | 5,409 | 93.4 | |
| Labor hold | | Swing | | |

1965 Western Australian state election: Albany
| Party | Candidate | Votes | % | ±% |
|---|---|---|---|---|
| Labor | Jack Hall | 3,586 | 58.2 | −6.1 |
| Liberal and Country | Norman Swarbrick | 1,685 | 27.3 | −8.4 |
| Country | Charles Johnson | 890 | 14.5 | +14.5 |
| Total formal votes | | 6,161 | 98.0 | −1.2 |
| Informal votes | | 126 | 2.0 | +1.2 |
| Turnout | | 6,287 | 94.7 | −0.4 |
Two-party-preferred result
| Labor | Jack Hall | 3,675 | 59.6 | −4.7 |
| Liberal and Country | Norman Swarbrick | 2,486 | 40.4 | +4.7 |
| Labor hold | | Swing | −4.7 | |

1962 Western Australian state election: Albany
| Party | Candidate | Votes | % | ±% |
|---|---|---|---|---|
| Labor | Jack Hall | 3,765 | 64.3 | |
| Liberal and Country | John Hutchinson | 2,095 | 35.7 | |
| Total formal votes | | 5,860 | 99.2 | |
| Informal votes | | 49 | 0.8 | |
| Turnout | | 5,909 | 95.1 | |
| Labor hold | | Swing | | |

=== Elections in the 1950s ===
1959 Western Australian state election: Albany
| Party | Candidate | Votes | % | ±% |
|---|---|---|---|---|
| Labor | Jack Hall | 3,041 | 53.8 | +8.2 |
| Liberal and Country | Roy Wellington | 1,199 | 21.2 | +21.2 |
| Country | Vincent Liddelow | 1,007 | 17.8 | −16.9 |
| Independent | Charles Johnson | 345 | 6.1 | +6.1 |
| Independent | Ernest Rogers | 63 | 1.1 | +1.1 |
| Total formal votes | | 5,655 | 98.3 | −0.3 |
| Informal votes | | 98 | 1.7 | +0.3 |
| Turnout | | 5,753 | 95.1 | +1.5 |
Two-party-preferred result
| Labor | Jack Hall | | 59.2 | +9.0 |
| Liberal and Country | Roy Wellington | | 40.8 | +40.8 |
| Labor hold | | Swing | +9.0 | |

- Two party preferred vote was estimated.

1956 Western Australian state election: Albany
| Party | Candidate | Votes | % | ±% |
|---|---|---|---|---|
| Labor | Jack Hall | 2,302 | 45.6 | |
| Country | Leonard Hill | 1,748 | 34.7 | |
| Country | Alfred Gulvin | 994 | 19.7 | |
| Total formal votes | | 5,044 | 98.6 | |
| Informal votes | | 73 | 1.4 | |
| Turnout | | 5,117 | 93.6 | |
Two-party-preferred result
| Labor | Jack Hall | 2,531 | 50.2 | |
| Country | Leonard Hill | 2,513 | 49.8 | |
| Labor gain from Country | | Swing | | |

1953 Western Australian state election: Albany
| Party | Candidate | Votes | % | ±% |
|---|---|---|---|---|
| Country | Leonard Hill | 3,307 | 55.9 | +12.0 |
| Labor | Karl Schulze | 2,604 | 44.1 | +3.3 |
| Total formal votes | | 5,911 | 98.7 | −0.2 |
| Informal votes | | 77 | 1.3 | +0.2 |
| Turnout | | 5,988 | 95.3 | +1.0 |
| Country hold | | Swing | −1.1 | |

1950 Western Australian state election: Albany
| Party | Candidate | Votes | % | ±% |
|---|---|---|---|---|
| Country | Leonard Hill | 2,112 | 44.0 | |
| Labor | William Martin | 1,962 | 40.8 | |
| Liberal and Country | Alistair MacDonald | 687 | 14.3 | |
| Independent | James Bolitho | 45 | 0.9 | |
| Total formal votes | | 4,806 | 98.9 | |
| Informal votes | | 52 | 1.1 | |
| Turnout | | 4,858 | 94.3 | |
Two-party-preferred result
| Country | Leonard Hill | 2,742 | 57.0 | |
| Labor | William Martin | 2,064 | 43.0 | |
| Country hold | | Swing | | |

=== Elections in the 1940s ===
1947 Western Australian state election: Albany
| Party | Candidate | Votes | % | ±% |
|---|---|---|---|---|
| Country | Leonard Hill | 2,141 | 49.6 | −5.0 |
| Labor | William Martin | 2,090 | 48.4 | +3.0 |
| Progressive (WA) | Egbert Shenton | 89 | 2.1 | +2.1 |
| Total formal votes | | 4,320 | 99.2 | +1.0 |
| Informal votes | | 33 | 0.8 | −1.0 |
| Turnout | | 4,353 | 91.3 | +7.7 |
Two-party-preferred result
| Country | Leonard Hill | 2,195 | 50.8 | −3.8 |
| Labor | William Martin | 2,125 | 49.2 | +3.8 |
| Country hold | | Swing | −3.8 | |

1943 Western Australian state election: Albany
| Party | Candidate | Votes | % | ±% |
|---|---|---|---|---|
| Country | Leonard Hill | 2,074 | 54.6 | +8.5 |
| Labor | Adrian Stacey | 1,727 | 45.4 | +2.9 |
| Total formal votes | | 3,801 | 98.2 | +0.3 |
| Informal votes | | 69 | 1.8 | −0.3 |
| Turnout | | 3,870 | 83.6 | −6.6 |
| Country hold | | Swing | −0.2 | |

=== Elections in the 1930s ===
1939 Western Australian state election: Albany
| Party | Candidate | Votes | % | ±% |
|---|---|---|---|---|
| Country | Leonard Hill | 1,854 | 46.1 | +8.2 |
| Labor | Arthur Wansbrough | 1,711 | 42.5 | +3.8 |
| Ind. Nationalist | Charles Hammond | 374 | 9.3 | +9.3 |
| Independent | James Bolitho | 84 | 2.1 | +2.1 |
| Total formal votes | | 4,023 | 97.9 | −1.3 |
| Informal votes | | 85 | 2.1 | +1.3 |
| Turnout | | 4,108 | 90.2 | +14.3 |
Two-party-preferred result
| Country | Leonard Hill | 2,203 | 54.8 | −2.8 |
| Labor | Arthur Wansbrough | 1,820 | 45.2 | +2.8 |
| Country hold | | Swing | −2.8 | |

1936 Western Australian state election: Albany
| Party | Candidate | Votes | % | ±% |
|---|---|---|---|---|
| Labor | Arthur Wansbrough | 1,285 | 38.7 | −12.8 |
| Country | Leonard Hill | 1,260 | 37.9 | +13.3 |
| Independent | Charles Bolt | 780 | 23.5 | +23.5 |
| Total formal votes | | 3,325 | 99.2 | +0.4 |
| Informal votes | | 26 | 0.8 | −0.4 |
| Turnout | | 3,351 | 75.9 | −16.7 |
Two-party-preferred result
| Country | Leonard Hill | 1,917 | 57.6 | |
| Labor | Arthur Wansbrough | 1,408 | 42.4 | |
| Country gain from Labor | | Swing | N/A | |

1933 Western Australian state election: Albany
| Party | Candidate | Votes | % | ±% |
|---|---|---|---|---|
| Labor | Arthur Wansbrough | 2,031 | 51.5 | +4.8 |
| Country | William Day | 969 | 24.6 | −0.2 |
| Independent Country | George Cooper | 804 | 20.4 | +20.4 |
| Country | Alfred Lawrence | 142 | 3.6 | +3.6 |
| Total formal votes | | 3,946 | 98.8 | +0.6 |
| Informal votes | | 46 | 1.2 | −0.6 |
| Turnout | | 3,992 | 92.6 | +17.6 |
| Labor hold | | Swing | N/A | |

- Preferences were not distributed.

1930 Western Australian state election: Albany
| Party | Candidate | Votes | % | ±% |
|---|---|---|---|---|
| Labor | Arthur Wansbrough | 1,394 | 46.7 | |
| Country | Leonard Hill | 742 | 24.9 | |
| Independent Country | Alfred Burvill | 615 | 20.6 | |
| Labor | Charles Watkins | 235 | 7.9 | |
| Total formal votes | | 2,986 | 98.2 | |
| Informal votes | | 56 | 1.8 | |
| Turnout | | 3,042 | 75.0 | |
Two-party-preferred result
| Labor | Arthur Wansbrough | 1,539 | 51.5 | |
| Country | Leonard Hill | 1,447 | 48.5 | |
| Labor hold | | Swing | | |

=== Elections in the 1920s ===
1927 Western Australian state election: Albany
| Party | Candidate | Votes | % | ±% |
|---|---|---|---|---|
| Labor | Arthur Wansbrough | 2,321 | 56.9 | +34.8 |
| Country | Archibald Booth | 1,758 | 43.1 | +43.1 |
| Total formal votes | | 4,079 | 99.0 | +1.1 |
| Informal votes | | 40 | 1.0 | −1.1 |
| Turnout | | 4,119 | 77.0 | +12.4 |
| Labor hold | | Swing | N/A | |

1924 Western Australian state election: Albany
| Party | Candidate | Votes | % | ±% |
|---|---|---|---|---|
| Nationalist | Robert Robinson | 1,035 | 35.4 | +35.4 |
| Labor | Washington Mather | 648 | 22.2 | −20.8 |
| Labor | Arthur Wansbrough | 644 | 22.1 | +22.1 |
| Independent | William Redman | 211 | 7.2 | +7.2 |
| Country | Percy Lambert | 201 | 6.9 | −50.2 |
| Country | Cuthbert McKenzie | 182 | 6.2 | +6.2 |
| Total formal votes | | 2,921 | 97.9 | −1.2 |
| Informal votes | | 63 | 2.1 | +1.2 |
| Turnout | | 2,984 | 64.6 | −1.6 |
Two-party-preferred result
| Labor | Arthur Wansbrough | 1,501 | 51.4 | +8.5 |
| Nationalist | Robert Robinson | 1,420 | 48.6 | +48.6 |
| Labor gain from Country | | Swing | +8.5 | |

1921 Western Australian state election: Albany
| Party | Candidate | Votes | % | ±% |
|---|---|---|---|---|
| Country | John Scaddan | 1,529 | 57.1 | +57.1 |
| Labor | Arthur Wansbrough | 1,149 | 42.9 | +4.6 |
| Total formal votes | | 2,678 | 99.2 | −0.1 |
| Informal votes | | 21 | 0.8 | +0.1 |
| Turnout | | 2,699 | 66.2 | −5.2 |
| Country gain from Nationalist | | Swing | N/A | |

=== Elections in the 1910s ===
1919 Albany state by-election
| Party | Candidate | Votes | % | ±% |
|---|---|---|---|---|
| Nationalist | John Scaddan | 1,680 | 61.7 | +34.8 |
| Labor | William Johnson | 1,041 | 38.3 | +12.5 |
| Total formal votes | | 2,721 | 99.3 | +0.5 |
| Informal votes | | 19 | 0.7 | −0.5 |
| Turnout | | 2,740 | 71.4 | −2.3 |
| Nationalist hold | | Swing | N/A | |

- Nationalist candidate John Scaddan contested Albany in the 1917 election as a member of the National Labor Party, and the primary swing displayed is against that.

1917 Western Australian state election: Albany
| Party | Candidate | Votes | % | ±% |
|---|---|---|---|---|
| National Labor | John Scaddan | 793 | 26.9 | +26.9 |
| Labor | Francis Knowles | 760 | 25.8 | –25.2 |
| Nationalist | Herbert Robinson | 722 | 24.5 | +24.5 |
| National Country | Ernest McKenzie | 376 | 12.8 | +12.8 |
| National Country | Stephen Johnson | 298 | 10.1 | +10.1 |
| Total formal votes | | 2,949 | 98.8 | –0.5 |
| Informal votes | | 35 | 1.2 | +0.5 |
| Turnout | | 2,984 | 73.7 | +7.5 |
Two-party-preferred result
| Nationalist | Herbert Robinson | 1,645 | 55.8 | +55.8 |
| National Labor | John Scaddan | 1,304 | 44.2 | +44.2 |
| Nationalist gain from Labor | | Swing | +55.8 | |

1914 Western Australian state election: Albany
| Party | Candidate | Votes | % | ±% |
|---|---|---|---|---|
| Labor | William Price | 1,560 | 51.0 | −4.1 |
| Liberal | Ernest McKenzie | 1,497 | 49.0 | +25.6 |
| Total formal votes | | 2,705 | 99.3 | +0.7 |
| Informal votes | | 21 | 0.7 | −0.7 |
| Turnout | | 3,078 | 66.2 | −17.7 |
| Labor hold | | Swing | N/A | |

1911 Western Australian state election: Albany
| Party | Candidate | Votes | % | ±% |
|---|---|---|---|---|
| Labor | William Price | 1,490 | 55.1 | |
| Ministerialist | Ernest McKenzie | 633 | 23.4 | |
| Ministerialist | William Mawson | 376 | 13.9 | |
| Ministerialist | Alexander Thomson | 119 | 4.4 | |
| Independent | John Parks | 87 | 3.2 | |
| Total formal votes | | 2,705 | 98.6 | |
| Informal votes | | 37 | 1.4 | |
| Turnout | | 2,742 | 83.9 | |
| Labor hold | | Swing | | |

- Preferences were not distributed.

=== Elections in the 1900s ===
1909 Albany state by-election
| Party | Candidate | Votes | % | ±% |
|---|---|---|---|---|
| Labor | William Price | 703 | 44.3 | +1.2 |
| Ministerialist | Phillip Meeks | 466 | 29.4 | −27.5 |
| Ministerialist | Wesley Maley | 418 | 26.3 | +26.3 |
| Total formal votes | | 1,587 | 99.1 | −0.4 |
| Informal votes | | 14 | 0.9 | +0.4 |
| Turnout | | 1,601 | 62.7 | −6.7 |
Two-party-preferred result
| Labor | William Price | 745 | 52.0 | +8.9 |
| Ministerialist | Phillip Meeks | 689 | 48.0 | −8.9 |
| Labor gain from Ministerialist | | Swing | +8.9 | |

1908 Western Australian state election: Albany
| Party | Candidate | Votes | % | ±% |
|---|---|---|---|---|
| Ministerialist | Edward Barnett | 938 | 56.9 | +1.8 |
| Labour | Edward Morgans | 710 | 43.1 | +43.1 |
| Total formal votes | | 1,648 | 99.5 | +0.4 |
| Informal votes | | 9 | 0.5 | −0.4 |
| Turnout | | 1,657 | 69.4 | +23.6 |
| Ministerialist hold | | Swing | N/A | |

1905 Western Australian state election: Albany
| Party | Candidate | Votes | % | ±% |
|---|---|---|---|---|
| Ministerialist | Edward Barnett | 674 | 55.1 | +55.1 |
| Ministerialist | Charles Keyser | 550 | 44.9 | –6.5 |
| Total formal votes | | 1,224 | 99.1 | +2.2 |
| Informal votes | | 11 | 0.9 | –2.2 |
| Turnout | | 1,241 | 45.8 | +1.7 |
| Ministerialist hold | | Swing | N/A | |

1904 Western Australian state election: Albany
| Party | Candidate | Votes | % | ±% |
|---|---|---|---|---|
| Labour | Charles Keyser | 852 | 51.4 | +51.4 |
| Ministerialist | Albert Hassell | 806 | 48.6 | +48.6 |
| Total formal votes | | 1,658 | 96.9 | –2.4 |
| Informal votes | | 53 | 3.1 | +2.4 |
| Turnout | | 1,711 | 43.1 | –8.4 |
| Labour gain from Opposition | | Swing | +51.4 | |

1901 Western Australian state election: Albany
| Party | Candidate | Votes | % | ±% |
|---|---|---|---|---|
| Opposition | James Gardiner | 590 | 69.2 | +21.1 |
| Opposition | William Nutting | 263 | 30.8 | +30.8 |
| Total formal votes | | 853 | 99.3 | +0.4 |
| Informal votes | | 6 | 0.7 | –0.4 |
| Turnout | | 859 | 51.5 | +0.8 |
| Opposition hold | | Swing | N/A | |

1900 Albany colonial by-election
| Party | Candidate | Votes | % | ±% |
|---|---|---|---|---|
| Opposition | John Hassell | 240 | 52.0 | |
| Opposition | James Gardiner | 222 | 48.0 | |
| Total formal votes | | 462 | 98.9 | |
| Informal votes | | 5 | 1.1 | |
| Turnout | | 467 | 50.7 | |
| Opposition hold | | Swing | N/A | |

=== Elections in the 1890s ===
1897 Western Australian colonial election: Albany
| Party | Candidate | Votes | % | ±% |
|---|---|---|---|---|
| Opposition | George Leake | unopposed | | |
| Opposition hold | | Swing | | |

1894 Western Australian colonial election: Albany
| Party | Candidate | Votes | % | ±% |
|---|---|---|---|---|
| None | George Leake | 187 | 50.1 | +50.1 |
| None | Francis Dymes | 186 | 49.9 | +49.9 |

1890 Western Australian colonial election: Albany
| Party | Candidate | Votes | % | ±% |
|---|---|---|---|---|
| None | Lancel de Hamel | 194 | 78.2 | n/a |
| None | Francis Bird | 54 | 21.8 | n/a |
