= Electoral results for the district of Hannans =

Western Australian district election results

This is a list of electoral results for the Electoral district of Hannans in Western Australian state elections.

== Members for Hannans ==
Member	Party	Term
John Reside	Labour	1901–1902
Thomas Bath	Labour	1902–1904
Wallace Nelson	Labour	1904–1905
Francis Ware	Labour	1905–1911
Selby Munsie	Labor	1911–1938
David Leahy	Labor	1938–1948
Harry McCulloch	Labor	1948–1956

== Election results ==
=== Elections in the 1950s ===
1953 Western Australian state election: Hannans
Party	Candidate	Votes	%	±%
Labor	Herbert McCulloch	2,210	60.3	−1.2
Independent	Harold Illingworth	1,453	39.7	+39.7
Total formal votes		3,663	97.4	−0.5
Informal votes		98	2.6	+0.5
Turnout		3,761	91.0	0.0
Labor hold		Swing	N/A	

1950 Western Australian state election: Hannans
Party	Candidate	Votes	%	±%
Labor	Herbert McCulloch	2,487	61.5	
Liberal and Country	Frederick Hicks	1,560	38.5	
Total formal votes		4,047	97.9	
Informal votes		87	2.1	
Turnout		4,134	91.0	
Labor hold		Swing		

=== Elections in the 1940s ===
1949 Hannans state by-election
Party	Candidate	Votes	%	±%
Labor	Harry McCulloch	1,512	57.4	N/A
Liberal	Fred Hicks	1,124	42.6	+42.6
Total formal votes		2,636	98.7	
Informal votes		35	1.3	
Turnout		2,671	79.4	
Labor hold		Swing	N/A	

1947 Western Australian state election: Hannans
Party	Candidate	Votes	%	±%
Labor	David Leahy	unopposed		
Labor hold		Swing		

1943 Western Australian state election: Hannans
Party	Candidate	Votes	%	±%
Labor	David Leahy	1,519	63.1	+1.4
Country	Jack Guise	890	36.9	+36.9
Total formal votes		2,409	97.4	−0.4
Informal votes		64	2.6	+0.4
Turnout		2,473	71.8	−22.8
Labor hold		Swing	+1.4	

=== Elections in the 1930s ===
1939 Western Australian state election: Hannans
Party	Candidate	Votes	%	±%
Labor	David Leahy	1,708	61.7	−38.3
Nationalist	Keith Burton	1,060	38.3	+38.3
Total formal votes		2,768	97.8	
Informal votes		61	2.2	
Turnout		2,829	94.6	
Labor hold		Swing	N/A	

1938 Hannans state by-election
Party	Candidate	Votes	%	±%
Labor	David Leahy	1,034	49.5	N/A
Nationalist	Richard Moore	618	29.6	+29.6
Nationalist	Keith Burton	243	11.6	+11.6
Western Australia Democratic League	Joseph D'Almeida	174	8.3	+8.3
Independent	George Walker	20	1.0	+1.0
Total formal votes		2,089	98.3	
Informal votes		35	1.7	
Turnout		2,124	83.4	
After distribution of preferences
Labor	David Leahy	1,094	52.4	N/A
Nationalist	Richard Moore	691	33.1	N/A
Nationalist	Keith Burton	304	14.5	N/A

- Preferences were not distributed to completion.

1936 Western Australian state election: Hannans
Party	Candidate	Votes	%	±%
Labor	Selby Munsie	unopposed		
Labor hold		Swing		

1933 Western Australian state election: Hannans
Party	Candidate	Votes	%	±%
Labor	Selby Munsie	unopposed		
Labor hold		Swing		

1930 Western Australian state election: Hannans
Party	Candidate	Votes	%	±%
Labor	Selby Munsie	unopposed		
Labor hold		Swing		

=== Elections in the 1920s ===
1927 Western Australian state election: Hannans
Party	Candidate	Votes	%	±%
Labor	Selby Munsie	422	74.7	−25.3
Ind. Nationalist	Branwell Saunders	143	25.3	+25.3
Total formal votes		565	99.1	
Informal votes		5	0.9	
Turnout		570	86.5	
Labor hold		Swing	N/A	

1924 Western Australian state election: Hannans
Party	Candidate	Votes	%	±%
Labor	Selby Munsie	unopposed		
Labor hold		Swing		

1921 Western Australian state election: Hannans
Party	Candidate	Votes	%	±%
Labor	Selby Munsie	792	67.0	+7.2
National Labor	Walter Openshaw	390	33.0	−3.3
Total formal votes		1,182	99.1	+1.4
Informal votes		11	0.9	−1.4
Turnout		1,193	73.2	+5.3
Labor hold		Swing	N/A	

=== Elections in the 1910s ===
1917 Western Australian state election: Hannans
Party	Candidate	Votes	%	±%
Labor	Selby Munsie	856	59.8	–40.2
National Labor	Walter Close	520	36.3	+36.3
Nationalist	Richard Jordan	56	3.9	+3.9
Total formal votes		1,432	97.7	n/a
Informal votes		34	2.3	n/a
Turnout		1,466	67.9	n/a
Labor hold		Swing	–40.2	

1914 Western Australian state election: Hannans
Party	Candidate	Votes	%	±%
Labor	Selby Munsie	unopposed		
Labor hold		Swing		

1911 Western Australian state election: Hannans
Party	Candidate	Votes	%	±%
Labor	Selby Munsie	unopposed		
Labor hold		Swing		

=== Elections in the 1900s ===
1908 Western Australian state election: Hannans
Party	Candidate	Votes	%	±%
Labour	Francis Ware	2,254	71.4	−2.8
Ministerialist	Mark Rosenberg	905	28.6	+2.8
Total formal votes		3,159	99.6	+1.0
Informal votes		12	0.4	−1.0
Turnout		3,171	65.5	+10.0
Labour hold		Swing	−2.8	

1905 Western Australian state election: Hannans
Party	Candidate	Votes	%	±%
Labour	Francis Ware	1,519	74.2	+8.8
Ministerialist	Robert Boylen	529	25.8	+25.8
Total formal votes		2,041	98.6	–1.2
Informal votes		29	1.4	+1.2
Turnout		2,070	55.5	+9.2
Labour hold		Swing	+8.8	

1904 Western Australian state election: Hannans
Party	Candidate	Votes	%	±%
Labour	Wallace Nelson	1,292	63.4	–36.6
Independent	John Marshall	746	36.6	+36.6
Total formal votes		2,038	99.8	n/a
Informal votes		5	0.2	n/a
Turnout		2,043	46.3	n/a
Labour hold		Swing	–36.6	

1902 Hannans state by-election
Party	Candidate	Votes	%	±%
Labour	Thomas Bath	unopposed		
Labour hold		Swing		

1901 Western Australian state election: Hannans
Party	Candidate	Votes	%	±%
Labour	John Reside	1,870	68.3	+68.3
Opposition	James Wilkinson	857	31.3	+31.3
Independent	Morgan Field	9	0.3	+0.3
Total formal votes		2,736	96.2	n/a
Informal votes		109	3.8	n/a
Turnout		2,845	40.5	n/a
Labour win		(new seat)		
