= Results of the 1908 Western Australian state election =

Western Australian state election, 1908 Legislative Assembly
Enrolled voters	135,979^{[1]}				
Votes cast	75,855		Turnout	66.49%	
Informal votes	926		Informal	1.22%	+0.21
Summary of votes by party
Party	Primary votes	%	Swing	Seats	Change
Ministerialist	46,169	61.62%	+7.78	28	–5
Labour	28,325	37.80%	+2.73	22	+8
Independent Labour	435	0.58%	–3.55	0	–1
Total	74,929			50	

This is a list of electoral district results of the 1908 Western Australian election.

== Results by electoral district ==
=== Albany ===
1908 Western Australian state election: Albany
Party	Candidate	Votes	%	±%
Ministerialist	Edward Barnett	938	56.9	+1.8
Labour	Edward Morgans	710	43.1	+43.1
Total formal votes		1,648	99.5	+0.4
Informal votes		9	0.5	−0.4
Turnout		1,657	69.4	+23.6
Ministerialist hold		Swing	N/A	

=== Balkatta ===
1908 Western Australian state election: Balkatta
Party	Candidate	Votes	%	±%
Labour	Frederick Gill	1,299	52.0	+7.4
Ministerialist	John Veryard	1,197	48.0	−7.4
Total formal votes		2,496	98.8	−0.6
Informal votes		31	1.2	+0.6
Turnout		2,527	72.7	+15.0
Labour gain from Ministerialist		Swing	+7.4	

=== Beverley ===
1908 Western Australian state election: Beverley
Party	Candidate	Votes	%	±%
Ministerialist	John Hopkins	501	32.3	+32.3
Ministerialist	Edmund Smith	431	27.7	−16.6
Ministerialist	George Ricks	297	19.1	−5.9
Labour	Patrick Whiteley	166	10.7	+10.7
Ministerialist	Edmund Lennard	132	8.5	+8.5
Ministerialist	James Martin	14	0.9	+0.9
Ministerialist	Richard Smith	12	0.8	+0.8
Total formal votes		1,553	97.4	−1.9
Informal votes		42	2.6	+1.9
Turnout		1,595	57.9	+6.4
Two-candidate-preferred result
Ministerialist	John Hopkins	677	50.7	
Ministerialist	Edmund Smith	659	49.3	
Ministerialist hold		Swing	N/A	

=== Boulder ===
1908 Western Australian state election: Boulder
Party	Candidate	Votes	%	±%
Labour	Philip Collier	1,798	73.1	+26.3
Ministerialist	James Johnston	661	26.9	−18.8
Total formal votes		2,459	97.2	−2.4
Informal votes		71	2.8	+2.4
Turnout		2,530	75.8	+6.7
Labour hold		Swing	N/A	

=== Brown Hill ===
1908 Western Australian state election: Brown Hill
Party	Candidate	Votes	%	±%
Labour	Thomas Bath	unopposed		
Labour hold		Swing		

=== Bunbury ===
1908 Western Australian state election: Bunbury
Party	Candidate	Votes	%	±%
Ministerialist	Newton Moore	unopposed		
Ministerialist hold		Swing		

=== Canning ===
1908 Western Australian state election: Canning
Party	Candidate	Votes	%	±%
Ministerialist	William Gordon	877	42.4	−8.2
Ministerialist	James Clydesdale	625	30.2	+30.2
Ministerialist	George Wilson	566	27.4	+27.4
Total formal votes		2,068	98.7	−1.2
Informal votes		28	1.3	+1.2
Turnout		2,096	73.9	+28.9
Two-candidate-preferred result
Ministerialist	William Gordon	1,064	55.7	
Ministerialist	James Clydesdale	846	44.3	
Ministerialist hold		Swing	N/A	

=== Claremont ===
1908 Western Australian state election: Claremont
Party	Candidate	Votes	%	±%
Ministerialist	John Foulkes	1,427	49.4	−21.9
Ministerialist	Thomas Briggs	825	28.6	+28.6
Ministerialist	John Stuart	636	22.0	+22.0
Total formal votes		2,888	99.4	+0.1
Informal votes		17	0.6	−0.1
Turnout		2,905	74.2	+28.6
Ministerialist hold		Swing	N/A	

=== Collie ===
1908 Western Australian state election: Collie
Party	Candidate	Votes	%	±%
Labour	Arthur Wilson	1,039	51.3	+5.3
Ministerialist	John Ewing	985	48.7	−5.3
Total formal votes		2,024	99.2	−0.7
Informal votes		17	0.8	+0.7
Turnout		2,041	71.3	+21.5
Labour gain from Ministerialist		Swing	+5.3	

=== Coolgardie ===
1908 Western Australian state election: Coolgardie
Party	Candidate	Votes	%	±%
Labour	Charles McDowall	1,010	60.1	+25.6
Ministerialist	William Eddy	670	39.9	+3.9
Total formal votes		1,680	99.3	+3.0
Informal votes		12	0.7	−3.0
Turnout		1,692	89.7	+33.4
Labour gain from Ministerialist		Swing	N/A	

=== Cue ===
1908 Western Australian state election: Cue
Party	Candidate	Votes	%	±%
Labour	Edward Heitmann	1,415	68.8	+17.4
Ministerialist	James Chesson	642	31.2	−17.4
Total formal votes		2,057	99.0	+0.1
Informal votes		21	1.0	−0.1
Turnout		2,078	69.0	+17.4
Labour hold		Swing	+17.4	

=== Dundas ===
1908 Western Australian state election: Dundas
Party	Candidate	Votes	%	±%
Labour	Charles Hudson	831	59.9	+21.6
Independent	Albert Thomas	557	40.1	+3.0
Total formal votes		1,388	99.1	+0.4
Informal votes		12	0.9	−0.4
Turnout		1,400	79.6	+18.1
Labour hold		Swing	N/A	

=== East Fremantle ===
1908 Western Australian state election: East Fremantle
Party	Candidate	Votes	%	±%
Labour	William Angwin	unopposed		
Labour hold		Swing		

=== East Perth ===
1908 Western Australian state election: East Perth
Party	Candidate	Votes	%	±%
Ministerialist	John Hardwick	887	39.1	−11.6
Labour	John Curran	538	23.7	−5.2
Ministerialist	Henry Mills	425	18.7	+18.7
Ministerialist	Henry Braidwood	344	15.2	+15.2
Ministerialist	Hugh McKernan	73	3.2	+3.2
Total formal votes		2,267	98.3	−0.7
Informal votes		38	1.7	+0.7
Turnout		2,305	63.0	+14.4
Two-party-preferred result
Ministerialist	John Hardwick	1,182	61.0	
Labour	John Curran	755	39.0	
Ministerialist hold		Swing	N/A	

=== Forrest ===
1908 Western Australian state election: Forrest
Party	Candidate	Votes	%	±%
Labour	Peter O'Loghlen	unopposed		
Labour hold		Swing		

=== Fremantle ===
1908 Western Australian state election: Fremantle
Party	Candidate	Votes	%	±%
Ministerialist	James Price	unopposed		
Ministerialist hold		Swing		

=== Gascoyne ===
1908 Western Australian state election: Gascoyne
Party	Candidate	Votes	%	±%
Ministerialist	William Butcher	unopposed		
Ministerialist hold		Swing		

=== Geraldton ===
1908 Western Australian state election: Geraldton
Party	Candidate	Votes	%	±%
Ministerialist	Henry Carson	646	44.3	−6.8
Labour	Thomas Brown	642	44.0	−4.9
Ministerialist	Robert Cochrane	171	11.7	+11.7
Total formal votes		1,459	98.9	−0.1
Informal votes		16	1.1	+0.1
Turnout		1,475	76.0	+4.2
Two-party-preferred result
Ministerialist	Henry Carson	710	51.7	+0.6
Labour	Thomas Brown	663	48.3	−0.6
Ministerialist hold		Swing	+0.6	

=== Greenough ===
1908 Western Australian state election: Greenough
Party	Candidate	Votes	%	±%
Ministerialist	John Nanson	567	62.4	+62.4
Ministerialist	Patrick Stone	342	37.6	−7.4
Total formal votes		909	98.4	−0.2
Informal votes		15	1.6	+0.2
Turnout		924	58.4	+2.9
Ministerialist hold		Swing	N/A	

=== Guildford ===
1908 Western Australian state election: Guildford
Party	Candidate	Votes	%	±%
Labour	William Johnson	1,980	69.6	+69.6
Ministerialist	Hubert Gull	534	18.8	−81.2
Ministerialist	George Lefroy	306	10.7	+10.7
Ministerialist	Edward Stevens	26	0.9	+0.9
Total formal votes		2,846	98.3	
Informal votes		49	1.7	
Turnout		2,895	79.7	
Labour gain from Ministerialist		Swing		

=== Hannans ===
1908 Western Australian state election: Hannans
Party	Candidate	Votes	%	±%
Labour	Francis Ware	2,254	71.4	−2.8
Ministerialist	Mark Rosenberg	905	28.6	+2.8
Total formal votes		3,159	99.6	+1.0
Informal votes		12	0.4	−1.0
Turnout		3,171	65.5	+10.0
Labour hold		Swing	−2.8	

=== Irwin ===
1908 Western Australian state election: Irwin
Party	Candidate	Votes	%	±%
Ministerialist	Samuel Moore	520	51.4	−48.6
Ministerialist	James Huggins	297	29.4	+29.4
Ministerialist	William Jose	194	19.2	+19.2
Total formal votes		1,011	97.9	
Informal votes		22	2.1	
Turnout		1,033	53.6	
Ministerialist hold		Swing	N/A	

=== Ivanhoe ===
1908 Western Australian state election: Ivanhoe
Party	Candidate	Votes	%	±%
Labour	John Scaddan	unopposed		
Labour hold		Swing		

=== Kalgoorlie ===
1908 Western Australian state election: Kalgoorlie
Party	Candidate	Votes	%	±%
Ministerialist	Norbert Keenan	1,614	58.3	−2.6
Labour	George McLeod	1,153	41.7	+2.6
Total formal votes		2,767	99.6	+0.4
Informal votes		12	0.4	−0.4
Turnout		2,779	77.0	+4.1
Ministerialist hold		Swing	−2.6	

=== Kanowna ===
1908 Western Australian state election: Kanowna
Party	Candidate	Votes	%	±%
Labour	Thomas Walker	945	82.8	+13.9
Ministerialist	Braidwood Evans	196	17.2	−13.9
Total formal votes		1,141	99.4	+0.3
Informal votes		7	0.6	−0.3
Turnout		1,148	56.0	+8.1
Labour hold		Swing	+13.9	

=== Katanning ===
1908 Western Australian state election: Katanning
Party	Candidate	Votes	%	±%
Ministerialist	Frederick Piesse	1,045	71.6	−28.4
Ministerialist	Alfred Fisher	414	28.4	+28.4
Total formal votes		1,459	99.7	
Informal votes		4	0.3	
Turnout		1,463	59.0	
Ministerialist hold		Swing	N/A	

=== Kimberley ===
1908 Western Australian state election: Kimberley
Party	Candidate	Votes	%	±%
Ministerialist	Arthur Male	410	63.3	+7.8
Ministerialist	Michael O'Donohue	238	36.7	+36.7
Total formal votes		648	97.4	−1.8
Informal votes		17	2.6	+1.8
Turnout		665	45.6	+3.1
Ministerialist hold		Swing	N/A	

=== Menzies ===
1908 Western Australian state election: Menzies
Party	Candidate	Votes	%	±%
Labour	Richard Buzacott	1,220	50.1	+2.6
Ministerialist	Henry Gregory	1,213	49.9	−2.6
Total formal votes		2,433	99.1	−0.2
Informal votes		23	0.9	+0.2
Turnout		2,456	82.1	+15.0
Labour gain from Ministerialist		Swing	+2.6	

- This result was declared void and was contested again in the 1908 Menzies state by-election.

=== Mount Leonora ===
1908 Western Australian state election: Mount Leonora
Party	Candidate	Votes	%	±%
Labour	Hugh Gourley	767	42.0	−25.5
Ministerialist	Joseph Semken	639	35.0	+2.5
Labour	John Carr	422	23.1	+23.1
Total formal votes		1,828	98.9	+0.4
Informal votes		21	1.1	−0.4
Turnout		1,849	53.0	+25.1
Two-party-preferred result
Labour	Hugh Gourley	1,079	62.0	−5.5
Ministerialist	Joseph Semken	662	38.0	+5.5
Labour hold		Swing	−5.5	

=== Mount Magnet ===
1908 Western Australian state election: Mount Magnet
Party	Candidate	Votes	%	±%
Labour	Michael Troy	unopposed		
Labour hold		Swing		

=== Mount Margaret ===
1908 Western Australian state election: Mount Margaret
Party	Candidate	Votes	%	±%
Labour	George Taylor	1,085	71.6	+17.7
Ministerialist	Andrew Faulds	431	28.3	+4.7
Total formal votes		1,516	99.4	+0.4
Informal votes		9	0.6	−0.4
Turnout		1,525	65.8	+36.1
Labour hold		Swing	N/A	

=== Murchison ===
1908 Western Australian state election: Murchison
Party	Candidate	Votes	%	±%
Labour	John Holman	941	90.6	−9.4
Ministerialist	Samuel Dyke	98	9.4	+9.4
Total formal votes		1,039	98.0	
Informal votes		21	2.0	
Turnout		1,060	50.1	
Labour hold		Swing	N/A	

=== Murray ===
1908 Western Australian state election: Murray
Party	Candidate	Votes	%	±%
Ministerialist	John McLarty	427	50.3	−22.5
Ministerialist	William George	421	49.7	+49.7
Total formal votes		848	99.4	+1.0
Informal votes		5	0.6	−1.0
Turnout		853	58.0	+13.9
Ministerialist hold		Swing	N/A	

=== Nelson ===
1908 Western Australian state election: Nelson
Party	Candidate	Votes	%	±%
Ministerialist	Charles Layman	1,075	64.7	+7.4
Labour	William Spiers	586	35.3	+35.3
Total formal votes		1,661	97.8	−1.7
Informal votes		37	2.2	+1.7
Turnout		1,698	75.4	+3.2
Ministerialist hold		Swing	N/A	

=== North Fremantle ===
1908 Western Australian state election: North Fremantle
Party	Candidate	Votes	%	±%
Labour	Harry Bolton	942	59.7	−2.8
Ministerialist	Patrick Hevron	635	40.3	+2.8
Total formal votes		1,577	99.6	0.0
Informal votes		7	0.4	0.0
Turnout		1,584	88.0	+21.3
Labour hold		Swing	−2.8	

=== North Perth ===
1908 Western Australian state election: North Perth
Party	Candidate	Votes	%	±%
Labour	Herbert Swan	1,534	30.6	−7.5
Ministerialist	James Brebber	1,079	21.5	−40.4
Ministerialist	James Franklin	1,004	20.0	+20.0
Ministerialist	Edward Brady	586	11.7	+11.7
Independent Labour	Cecil Le Mesurier	435	8.7	+8.7
Ministerialist	Edward Hart	373	7.4	+7.4
Total formal votes		5,011	98.6	−0.4
Informal votes		73	1.4	+0.4
Turnout		5,084	65.8	+17.6
Two-party-preferred result
Labour	Herbert Swan	2,094	51.8	+13.7
Ministerialist	James Brebber	1,952	48.2	−13.7
Labour gain from Ministerialist		Swing	+13.7	

=== Northam ===
1908 Western Australian state election: Northam
Party	Candidate	Votes	%	±%
Ministerialist	James Mitchell	1,372	54.5	−0.7
Labour	Alfred Watts	1,147	45.5	+0.7
Total formal votes		2,519	97.8	−1.7
Informal votes		57	2.2	+1.7
Turnout		2,576	55.9	+2.8
Ministerialist hold		Swing	−0.7	

=== Perth ===
1908 Western Australian state election: Perth
Party	Candidate	Votes	%	±%
Ministerialist	Harry Brown	1,037	71.9	+18.9
Ministerialist	Arthur O'Connor	405	28.1	+28.1
Total formal votes		1,442	98.7	+0.5
Informal votes		19	1.3	−0.5
Turnout		1,461	63.0	+0.6
Ministerialist hold		Swing	N/A	

=== Pilbara ===
1908 Western Australian state election: Pilbara
Party	Candidate	Votes	%	±%
Labour	Henry Underwood	468	58.1	+4.7
Ministerialist	John Weir	338	41.9	−4.7
Total formal votes		806	99.1	+0.4
Informal votes		7	0.9	−0.4
Turnout		811	76.1	+37.2
Labour hold		Swing	−4.7	

=== Roebourne ===
1908 Western Australian state election: Roebourne
Party	Candidate	Votes	%	±%
Ministerialist	Henry Osborn	185	52.7	−47.3
Ministerialist	Albert Wilson	145	41.3	+41.3
Ministerialist	William Withnell	21	6.0	+6.0
Total formal votes		351	93.6	
Informal votes		24	6.4	
Turnout		375	48.1	
Ministerialist hold		Swing	N/A	

=== South Fremantle ===
1908 Western Australian state election: South Fremantle
Party	Candidate	Votes	%	±%
Ministerialist	Arthur Davies	unopposed		
Ministerialist hold		Swing		

=== Subiaco ===
1908 Western Australian state election: Subiaco
Party	Candidate	Votes	%	±%
Ministerialist	Henry Daglish	2,527	61.1	+13.0
Labour	Walter Richardson	1,606	38.9	+38.9
Total formal votes		4,133	99.0	+0.2
Informal votes		41	1.0	−0.2
Turnout		4,174	80.4	+18.7
Ministerialist gain from Independent Labour		Swing	N/A	

=== Sussex ===
1908 Western Australian state election: Sussex
Party	Candidate	Votes	%	±%
Ministerialist	Frank Wilson	574	53.6	−22.9
Labour	William Thomas	497	46.4	+46.4
Total formal votes		1,071	99.6	+2.6
Informal votes		4	0.4	−2.6
Turnout		1,075	88.1	+15.6
Ministerialist hold		Swing	N/A	

=== Swan ===
1908 Western Australian state election: Swan
Party	Candidate	Votes	%	±%
Ministerialist	Mathieson Jacoby	677	40.0	−8.1
Ministerialist	Arthur Gull	391	23.1	−28.8
Ministerialist	Archibald Sanderson	328	19.4	+19.4
Labour	Hugh Linnanne	297	17.5	+17.5
Total formal votes		1,693	99.0	−0.8
Informal votes		17	1.0	+0.8
Turnout		1,710	53.2	+18.8
Two-candidate-preferred result
Ministerialist	Mathieson Jacoby	892	58.7	+10.6
Ministerialist	Arthur Gull	627	41.2	−10.6
Ministerialist hold		Swing	+10.6	

=== Toodyay ===
1908 Western Australian state election: Toodyay
Party	Candidate	Votes	%	±%
Ministerialist	Timothy Quinlan	740	68.5	−31.5
Ministerialist	Fitzgerald Frazer	341	31.5	+31.5
Total formal votes		1,081	98.5	
Informal votes		16	1.5	
Turnout		1,097	57.7	
Ministerialist hold		Swing	N/A	

=== Wellington ===
1908 Western Australian state election: Wellington
Party	Candidate	Votes	%	±%
Ministerialist	Thomas Hayward	666	51.5	−25.7
Ministerialist	William Nairn	402	31.1	+31.1
Ministerialist	Hugh McNeil	225	17.4	+17.4
Total formal votes		1,293	98.6	−0.9
Informal votes		18	1.4	+0.9
Turnout		1,311	63.5	+20.9
Ministerialist hold		Swing	N/A	

=== West Perth ===
1908 Western Australian state election: West Perth
Party	Candidate	Votes	%	±%
Ministerialist	Thomas Draper	1,401	54.7	−10.7
Ministerialist	Walter Simpson	1,161	45.3	+45.3
Total formal votes		2,562	99.6	+1.2
Informal votes		9	0.4	−1.2
Turnout		2,571	66.0	+16.8
Ministerialist hold		Swing	N/A	

=== Williams ===
1908 Western Australian state election: Williams
Party	Candidate	Votes	%	±%
Ministerialist	Frank Cowcher	1,323	61.8	−19.4
Labour	Edward Hamersley	337	15.7	+15.7
Ministerialist	William Moss	299	14.0	+14.0
Ministerialist	William Rabbish	182	8.5	+8.5
Total formal votes		2,141	98.5	−0.1
Informal votes		32	1.5	+0.1
Turnout		2,173	51.1	+8.5
Ministerialist hold		Swing	N/A	

=== Yilgarn ===
1908 Western Australian state election: Yilgarn
Party	Candidate	Votes	%	±%
Labour	Austin Horan	676	90.5	+31.8
Ministerialist	William Allen	71	9.5	+9.5
Total formal votes		747	99.2	+0.7
Informal votes		6	0.8	−0.7
Turnout		753	35.9	−7.5
Labour hold		Swing	N/A	

=== York ===
1908 Western Australian state election: York
Party	Candidate	Votes	%	±%
Ministerialist	Frederick Monger	633	51.5	−5.9
Ministerialist	Edward Neville	418	34.0	+34.0
Ministerialist	John Taylor	179	14.5	+14.5
Total formal votes		1,230	98.6	−1.0
Informal votes		18	1.4	+1.0
Total formal votes		1,248	65.7	+15.3
Ministerialist hold		Swing	N/A	

== See also ==
- 1908 Western Australian state election
- Members of the Western Australian Legislative Assembly, 1908–1911
