= Members of the Western Australian Legislative Assembly, 1908–1911 =

This is a list of members of the Western Australian Legislative Assembly between the 1908 elections and the 1911 elections, together known as the Seventh Parliament.

Name	Party	District	Years in office
William Angwin	Labor	East Fremantle	1904–1905; 1906–1927
Edward Barnett^{[5]}	Ministerial	Albany	1905–1909
Thomas Bath	Labor	Brown Hill	1902–1914
Harry Bolton	Labor	North Fremantle	1904–1917
Harry Brown	Ministerial	Perth	1904–1911
William Butcher^{[9]}	Ministerial	Gascoyne	1901–1911; 1915–1917
Henry Carson	Ministerial	Geraldton	1904–1906; 1908–1911
Philip Collier	Labor	Boulder	1905–1948
Frank Cowcher	Ministerial	Williams	1904–1911
Henry Daglish^{[11]}	Ministerial	Subiaco	1901–1911
Arthur Davies	Ministerial	South Fremantle	1906–1911
Thomas Draper	Ministerial	West Perth	1907–1911; 1917–1921
John Foulkes	Ministerial	Claremont	1902–1911
William James George^{[2]}	Ministerial	Murray	1895–1902; 1909–1930
Frederick Gill	Labor	Balcatta	1904–1905; 1908–1914
William Gordon	Ministerial	Canning	1901–1911
Hugh Gourley	Labor	Mount Leonora	1908–1911
Henry Gregory^{[1]}	Ministerial	Menzies	1897–1911
John Hardwick	Ministerial	East Perth	1904–1911; 1914–1921
Nat Harper^{[10]}	Ministerial	Beverley	1910–1914
Thomas Hayward	Ministerial	Wellington	1901–1911
Edward Heitmann	Labor	Cue	1904–1913; 1914–1917
John Holman	Labor	Murchison	1901–1921; 1923–1925
John Marquis Hopkins^{[10]}	Ministerial	Beverley	1901–1905; 1908–1910
Austin Horan	Labor	Yilgarn	1904–1911
Charles Hudson	Labor	Dundas	1905–1921
Mathieson Jacoby	Ministerial	Swan	1901–1905; 1908–1911
William Johnson	Labor	Guildford	1901–1905; 1906–1917; 1924–1948
Dennis Jones^{[7]}	Labor	Forrest	1910
Norbert Keenan	Min / Ind	Kalgoorlie	1905–1911; 1930–1950
Charles Layman	Ministerial	Nelson	1904–1914
Arthur Male	Ministerial	Kimberley	1905–1917
Charles McDowall	Labor	Coolgardie	1908–1916
John McLarty^{[2]}	Ministerial	Murray	1904–1909
James Mitchell^{[3]}	Ministerial	Northam	1905–1933
Frederick Monger	Ministerial	York	1892–1903; 1905–1914
Hon Sir Newton Moore^{[12]}	Ministerial	Bunbury	1904–1911
Samuel Moore	Ministerial	Irwin	1904–1914
William Murphy^{[8]}	Ministerial	Fremantle	1910–1911
John Nanson^{[4]}	Ministerial	Greenough	1901–1905; 1908–1914
Peter O'Loghlen^{[7]}	Labor	Forrest	1908–1923
Henry Osborn	Ministerial	Roebourne	1908–1911
Arnold Piesse^{[6]}	Ministerial	Katanning	1909–1914; 1930–1935
Frederick Henry Piesse^{[6]}	Ministerial	Katanning	1890–1909
James Price^{[8]}	Ministerial	Fremantle	1905–1910
William Price^{[5]}	Labor	Albany	1909–1917
Timothy Quinlan	Ministerial	Toodyay	1890–1894; 1897–1911
John Scaddan	Labor	Ivanhoe	1904–1917; 1919–1924; 1930–1933
Herbert Swan	Labor	North Perth	1908–1914
George Taylor	Labor	Mount Margaret	1901–1930
William Lemen Thomas^{[12]}	Labor	Bunbury	1911–1917
Michael Troy	Labor	Mount Magnet	1904–1939
Henry Underwood	Labor	Pilbara	1906–1924
Thomas Walker	Labor	Kanowna	1905–1932
Francis Ware	Labor	Hannans	1905–1911
Arthur Wilson	Labor	Collie	1908–1947
Frank Wilson	Ministerial	Sussex	1897–1901; 1904–1917

== Notes ==
^{1} Following the 1908 state election, Ministerial member Henry Gregory, who had won the seat of Menzies by just 7 votes against Labor's Richard Buzacott, faced a by-election after a petition was lodged against his return. He was returned at the by-election on 20 November 1908 with a majority of 56 votes against the same opponent.
^{2} The member for Murray, John McLarty, died on 6 January 1909. William George, a former member for Murray, won the resulting by-election on 4 February 1909.
^{3} James Mitchell, member for Northam, was appointed by Premier Newton Moore as Minister for Lands and Agriculture on 14 May 1909. Mitchell was therefore required to resign and contest a ministerial by-election on 3 June 1909, in which he was successful.
^{4} John Nanson, member for Greenough, was appointed by Premier Newton Moore as Minister for Education and Attorney-General in June 1909. Nanson was therefore required to resign and submit to a ministerial by-election on 8 July 1909, at which he was returned unopposed.
^{5} The Ministerial member for Albany, Edward Barnett, resigned in September 1909. The Labor candidate, William Price, won the resulting by-election on 17 September 1909.
^{6} On 26 October 1909, Frederick Henry Piesse resigned his seat of Katanning. His brother Arnold Piesse was returned unopposed at the resulting by-election on 12 November 1909.
^{7} Peter O'Loghlen, the Labor member for Forrest, resigned his seat in March 1910 to contest the seat of Swan at the 1910 federal election on 13 April. Dennis Jones, the Labor candidate and president of the Amalgamated Timber Association, was elected unopposed on 23 March 1910, but resigned on 20 June before being sworn in. O'Loghlen contested a second by-election for Forrest on 8 July 1910, at which he was successful.
^{8} On 21 May 1910, James Price died, leaving the seat of Fremantle vacant. William Murphy was elected at the resulting by-election on 9 June 1910.
^{9} On 18 June 1910, William Butcher, the member for Gascoyne, resigned in consequence of having sold some land to the Government at Avondale Estate near Beverley. He was returned unopposed in the resulting by-election when nominations closed on 28 June 1910.
^{10} On 12 April 1910, the member for Beverley, John Marquis Hopkins, was jailed for five years for uttering. On 28 July, his seat was formally declared vacant by means of disqualification from membership of the Legislative Assembly, and Nat Harper won the resulting by-election on 15 August 1910.
^{11} Henry Daglish, member for Subiaco, was appointed by the new Premier Frank Wilson as Minister for Works on 16 September 1910. Daglish was therefore required to resign and submit to a ministerial by-election, at which he was returned unopposed when nominations closed on 24 September 1910.
^{12} The Ministerial member for Bunbury, former Premier Newton Moore, resigned on 13 February 1911 after being appointed Agent-General of Western Australia in London. The Labor candidate, William Lemen Thomas, won the resulting by-election on 1 March 1911, but as the last sitting of the Seventh Parliament had concluded, he did not take up his seat until being re-elected at the general election on 3 October.

== Sources ==
- Black, David; Prescott, Valerie (1997). Election statistics, Legislative Assembly of Western Australia, 1890-1996. Perth: Parliamentary History Project. ISBN 0-7309-8409-5.
- Hughes, Colin A.; Graham, B. D. (1976). Voting for the South Australian, Western Australian and Tasmanian Lower Houses, 1890-1964. Canberra: Australian National University. ISBN 0-7081-1334-6.
- Parliament of Western Australia. Western Australian Parliamentary Debates (Seventh Parliament—Third Session). Vol. 50. Frederick William Simpson. pp. v–vi.
- Western Australian Government Gazettes for 1909, 1910 and 1911; Indexed under "Electoral".
