= Electoral results for the district of Brown Hill =

Western Australian district election results

This is a list of electoral results for the Electoral district of Brown Hill in Western Australian state elections.

== Members for Brown Hill ==
Member	Party	Term
Thomas Bath	Labor	1904–1911

== Election results ==
=== Elections in the 1900s ===
1908 Western Australian state election: Brown Hill
Party	Candidate	Votes	%	±%
Labour	Thomas Bath	unopposed		
Labour hold		Swing		

1905 Western Australian state election: Brown Hill
Party	Candidate	Votes	%	±%
Labour	Thomas Bath	1,093	69.3	–30.7
Independent	Richard White	484	30.7	+30.7
Total formal votes		1,577	99.6	n/a
Informal votes		7	0.4	n/a
Turnout		1,584	57.9	n/a
Labour hold		Swing	–30.7	

1904 Western Australian state election: Brown Hill
Party	Candidate	Votes	%	±%
Labour	Thomas Bath	unopposed		
Labour win		(new seat)		
