= Electoral results for the district of Northam =

Western Australian district election results

This is a list of electoral results for the Electoral district of Northam in Western Australian state elections.

== Members for Northam ==
| Member | Party | Term |
|---|---|---|
| George Throssell | Ministerial | 1890–1904 |
| Alfred Watts | Labor | 1904–1905 |
| James Mitchell | Ministerial | 1905–1911 |
| James Mitchell | Liberal (WA) | 1911–1917 |
| James Mitchell | Nationalist | 1917–1933 |
| Bert Hawke | Labor | 1933–1968 |
| Ken McIver | Labor | 1968–1974 |

== Election results ==
=== Elections in the 1970s ===
1971 Western Australian state election: Northam
| Party | Candidate | Votes | % | ±% |
|---|---|---|---|---|
| Labor | Ken McIver | 3,516 | 60.9 | +12.1 |
| Independent | Claude Roediger | 2,103 | 36.4 | +36.4 |
| Democratic Labor | John Van der Zanden | 159 | 2.3 | +2.3 |
| Total formal votes | | 5,778 | 97.3 | −1.6 |
| Informal votes | | 161 | 2.7 | +1.6 |
| Turnout | | 5,939 | 93.0 | −0.6 |
Two-candidate-preferred result
| Labor | Ken McIver | 3,540 | 61.3 | +7.7 |
| Independent | Claude Roediger | 2,238 | 38.7 | +38.7 |
| Labor hold | | Swing | N/A | |

=== Elections in the 1960s ===
1968 Western Australian state election: Northam
| Party | Candidate | Votes | % | ±% |
|---|---|---|---|---|
| Labor | Ken McIver | 2,674 | 48.8 | |
| Liberal and Country | Claude Roediger | 1,808 | 33.0 | |
| Country | Maurice Armstrong | 1,003 | 18.3 | |
| Total formal votes | | 5,485 | 98.9 | |
| Informal votes | | 60 | 1.1 | |
| Turnout | | 5,545 | 93.6 | |
Two-party-preferred result
| Labor | Ken McIver | 2,942 | 53.6 | |
| Liberal and Country | Claude Roediger | 2,543 | 46.4 | |
| Labor hold | | Swing | | |

1965 Western Australian state election: Northam
| Party | Candidate | Votes | % | ±% |
|---|---|---|---|---|
| Labor | Bert Hawke | 3,078 | 57.9 | −42.1 |
| Liberal and Country | Claude Roediger | 2,240 | 42.1 | +42.1 |
| Total formal votes | | 5,318 | 99.2 | |
| Informal votes | | 43 | 0.8 | |
| Turnout | | 5,361 | 92.7 | |
| Labor hold | | Swing | N/A | |

1962 Western Australian state election: Northam
| Party | Candidate | Votes | % | ±% |
|---|---|---|---|---|
| Labor | Bert Hawke | unopposed | | |
| Labor hold | | Swing | | |

=== Elections in the 1950s ===
1959 Western Australian state election: Northam
| Party | Candidate | Votes | % | ±% |
|---|---|---|---|---|
| Labor | Bert Hawke | 2,911 | 57.6 | −18.8 |
| Liberal and Country | Lawrence Solomon | 1,860 | 36.8 | +36.8 |
| Democratic Labor | Brian McGinty | 285 | 5.6 | +5.6 |
| Total formal votes | | 5,056 | 99.2 | +1.3 |
| Informal votes | | 43 | 0.8 | −1.3 |
| Turnout | | 5,099 | 94.3 | +2.8 |
Two-party-preferred result
| Labor | Bert Hawke | | 58.4 | −18.0 |
| Liberal and Country | Lawrence Solomon | | 41.6 | +41.6 |
| Labor hold | | Swing | N/A | |

- Two party preferred vote was estimated.

1956 Western Australian state election: Northam
| Party | Candidate | Votes | % | ±% |
|---|---|---|---|---|
| Labor | Bert Hawke | 3,483 | 76.4 | |
| Independent Liberal | James Collins | 1,075 | 23.6 | |
| Total formal votes | | 4,558 | 97.9 | |
| Informal votes | | 96 | 2.1 | |
| Turnout | | 4,654 | 91.5 | |
| Labor hold | | Swing | | |

1953 Western Australian state election: Northam
| Party | Candidate | Votes | % | ±% |
|---|---|---|---|---|
| Labor | Bert Hawke | unopposed | | |
| Labor hold | | Swing | | |

1950 Western Australian state election: Northam
| Party | Candidate | Votes | % | ±% |
|---|---|---|---|---|
| Labor | Bert Hawke | 3,123 | 65.6 | |
| Country | Thomas Letch | 1,635 | 34.4 | |
| Total formal votes | | 4,758 | 98.7 | |
| Informal votes | | 63 | 1.3 | |
| Turnout | | 4,821 | 92.4 | |
| Labor hold | | Swing | | |

=== Elections in the 1940s ===
1947 Western Australian state election: Northam
| Party | Candidate | Votes | % | ±% |
|---|---|---|---|---|
| Labor | Bert Hawke | 2,245 | 56.2 | −13.7 |
| Country | Norm Baxter | 1,753 | 43.8 | +13.7 |
| Total formal votes | | 3,998 | 98.7 | +0.3 |
| Informal votes | | 53 | 1.3 | −0.3 |
| Turnout | | 4,051 | 80.0 | −5.4 |
| Labor hold | | Swing | +13.7 | |

1943 Western Australian state election: Northam
| Party | Candidate | Votes | % | ±% |
|---|---|---|---|---|
| Labor | Bert Hawke | 2,828 | 69.9 | +7.1 |
| Country | Hurtle Prater | 1,217 | 30.1 | +30.1 |
| Total formal votes | | 4,045 | 98.4 | −0.4 |
| Informal votes | | 64 | 1.6 | +0.4 |
| Turnout | | 4,109 | 85.4 | −8.2 |
| Labor hold | | Swing | +7.1 | |

=== Elections in the 1930s ===
1939 Western Australian state election: Northam
| Party | Candidate | Votes | % | ±% |
|---|---|---|---|---|
| Labor | Bert Hawke | 2,670 | 62.8 | −1.5 |
| Nationalist | John Safe | 1,579 | 37.2 | +1.5 |
| Total formal votes | | 4,249 | 98.8 | −0.4 |
| Informal votes | | 53 | 1.2 | +0.4 |
| Turnout | | 4,302 | 93.6 | +7.8 |
| Labor hold | | Swing | −1.5 | |

1936 Western Australian state election: Northam
| Party | Candidate | Votes | % | ±% |
|---|---|---|---|---|
| Labor | Bert Hawke | 2,537 | 64.3 | +8.9 |
| Nationalist | Hal C.S. Colebatch | 1,407 | 35.7 | −1.1 |
| Total formal votes | | 3,944 | 99.2 | +0.4 |
| Informal votes | | 30 | 0.8 | −0.4 |
| Turnout | | 3,974 | 85.8 | −9.5 |
| Labor hold | | Swing | N/A | |

1933 Western Australian state election: Northam
| Party | Candidate | Votes | % | ±% |
|---|---|---|---|---|
| Labor | Bert Hawke | 2,369 | 55.4 | +8.8 |
| Nationalist | James Mitchell | 1,575 | 36.8 | −16.6 |
| Country | Thomas Peterson | 334 | 7.8 | +7.8 |
| Total formal votes | | 4,278 | 98.8 | −0.4 |
| Informal votes | | 52 | 1.2 | +0.4 |
| Turnout | | 4,330 | 95.3 | +14.3 |
| Labor gain from Nationalist | | Swing | N/A | |

- Preferences were not distributed.

1930 Western Australian state election: Northam
| Party | Candidate | Votes | % | ±% |
|---|---|---|---|---|
| Nationalist | James Mitchell | 1,982 | 53.4 | |
| Labor | Patrick Coffey | 1,726 | 46.6 | |
| Total formal votes | | 3,708 | 99.2 | |
| Informal votes | | 31 | 0.8 | |
| Turnout | | 3,739 | 81.0 | |
| Nationalist hold | | Swing | | |

=== Elections in the 1920s ===
1927 Western Australian state election: Northam
| Party | Candidate | Votes | % | ±% |
|---|---|---|---|---|
| Nationalist | James Mitchell | 1,546 | 53.6 | +0.6 |
| Labor | Bill Hegney | 1,337 | 46.4 | −0.6 |
| Total formal votes | | 2,883 | 99.2 | 0.0 |
| Informal votes | | 23 | 0.8 | 0.0 |
| Turnout | | 2,906 | 84.5 | +9.0 |
| Nationalist hold | | Swing | +0.6 | |

1924 Western Australian state election: Northam
| Party | Candidate | Votes | % | ±% |
|---|---|---|---|---|
| Nationalist | James Mitchell | 1,296 | 53.0 | −5.1 |
| Labor | Louis Grieve | 1,149 | 47.0 | +5.1 |
| Total formal votes | | 2,445 | 99.2 | 0.0 |
| Informal votes | | 20 | 0.8 | 0.0 |
| Turnout | | 2,465 | 75.5 | +2.3 |
| Nationalist hold | | Swing | −5.1 | |

1921 Western Australian state election: Northam
| Party | Candidate | Votes | % | ±% |
|---|---|---|---|---|
| Nationalist | James Mitchell | 1,051 | 58.1 | −41.9 |
| Labor | Louis Grieve | 758 | 41.9 | +41.9 |
| Total formal votes | | 1,809 | 99.2 | |
| Informal votes | | 14 | 0.8 | |
| Turnout | | 1,823 | 73.2 | |
| Nationalist hold | | Swing | N/A | |

=== Elections in the 1910s ===
1917 Western Australian state election: Northam
| Party | Candidate | Votes | % | ±% |
|---|---|---|---|---|
| National Liberal | James Mitchell | unopposed | | |
| National Liberal hold | | Swing | | |

1914 Western Australian state election: Northam
| Party | Candidate | Votes | % | ±% |
|---|---|---|---|---|
| Liberal | James Mitchell | 1,085 | 50.9 | −0.1 |
| Labor | James Kenneally | 878 | 41.2 | −7.8 |
| Country | Oscar Bernard | 167 | 7.8 | +7.8 |
| Total formal votes | | 2,130 | 98.4 | −0.9 |
| Informal votes | | 35 | 1.6 | +0.9 |
| Turnout | | 2,165 | 66.1 | −5.9 |
| Liberal hold | | Swing | N/A | |

- Preferences were not distributed.

1911 Western Australian state election: Northam
| Party | Candidate | Votes | % | ±% |
|---|---|---|---|---|
| Ministerialist | James Mitchell | 1,037 | 51.0 | |
| Labor | Alfred Watts | 995 | 49.0 | |
| Total formal votes | | 2,032 | 99.3 | |
| Informal votes | | 14 | 0.7 | |
| Turnout | | 2,046 | 72.0 | |
| Ministerialist hold | | Swing | | |

=== Elections in the 1900s ===
1908 Western Australian state election: Northam
| Party | Candidate | Votes | % | ±% |
|---|---|---|---|---|
| Ministerialist | James Mitchell | 1,372 | 54.5 | −0.7 |
| Labour | Alfred Watts | 1,147 | 45.5 | +0.7 |
| Total formal votes | | 2,519 | 97.8 | −1.7 |
| Informal votes | | 57 | 2.2 | +1.7 |
| Turnout | | 2,576 | 55.9 | +2.8 |
| Ministerialist hold | | Swing | −0.7 | |

1905 Western Australian state election: Northam
| Party | Candidate | Votes | % | ±% |
|---|---|---|---|---|
| Ministerialist | James Mitchell | 984 | 55.2 | +11.9 |
| Labour | Alfred Watts | 800 | 44.8 | –11.9 |
| Total formal votes | | 1,784 | 99.5 | +0.4 |
| Informal votes | | 8 | 0.5 | –0.4 |
| Turnout | | 1,790 | 53.1 | +6.3 |
| Ministerialist gain from Labour | | Swing | +11.9 | |

1904 Western Australian state election: Northam
| Party | Candidate | Votes | % | ±% |
|---|---|---|---|---|
| Labour | Alfred Watts | 1,033 | 56.7 | +56.7 |
| Ministerialist | Charles Knight | 788 | 43.3 | +43.3 |
| Total formal votes | | 1,821 | 99.1 | n/a |
| Informal votes | | 17 | 0.9 | n/a |
| Turnout | | 1,847 | 46.8 | n/a |
| Labour gain from Ministerialist | | Swing | +56.7 | |

1901 Western Australian state election: Northam
| Party | Candidate | Votes | % | ±% |
|---|---|---|---|---|
| Ministerialist | George Throssell | unopposed | | |
| Ministerialist hold | | Swing | | |

=== Elections in the 1890s ===
1897 Western Australian colonial election: Northam
| Party | Candidate | Votes | % | ±% |
|---|---|---|---|---|
| Ministerialist | George Throssell | unopposed | | |
| Ministerialist hold | | Swing | | |

1894 Western Australian colonial election: Northam
| Party | Candidate | Votes | % | ±% |
|---|---|---|---|---|
| None | George Throssell | 163 | 73.4 | –26.6 |
| None | Henry Cooke | 59 | 26.6 | +26.6 |

1890 Western Australian colonial election: Northam
| Party | Candidate | Votes | % | ±% |
|---|---|---|---|---|
| None | George Throssell | unopposed | | |
