= Herbert Robinson =

Herbert Robinson may refer to:

- Herbert C. Robinson (1874–1929), British zoologist and ornithologist
- Herbert R. Robinson (1909–1990), member of the Legislative Council of Western Australia
- Herbert Robinson (Queensland politician) (1893–1969), member of the Legislative Assembly of Queensland
- Herbert Robinson (Western Australian politician) (1876–1919), member of the Legislative Assembly of Western Australia
