= John Reside =

Australian politician

Member of the Legislative Assembly of Western Australia
- In office 24 April 1901 – 28 September 1902
- Preceded by: None (new seat)
- Succeeded by: Thomas Bath
- Constituency: Hannans

Personal details
- Born: 19 August 1867 White Hills, Victoria, Australia
- Died: 28 September 1902 (aged 35) Kalgoorlie, Western Australia, Australia
- Party: Labor Party

John Reside (19 August 1867 – 28 September 1902) was an Australian trade unionist and politician who was a Labor Party member of the Legislative Assembly of Western Australia from 1901 until his death, representing the seat of Hannans.

Reside was born in Bendigo, Victoria, to Nancy (née Carr) and William Reside. He attended the Bendigo School of Mines and qualified as a mine engine driver in 1888, afterward working at various mines in the local area. He also became involved in the labour movement, serving as a branch president of the Engine Driver's Union and as a member of Bendigo's trades and labour council. Reside moved to Kalgoorlie, Western Australia, in 1897, and helped to found the Eastern Goldfields Trades and Labour Council, of which he later became president. Reside entered parliament at the 1901 state election, winning the newly created seat of Hannans. However, his time in parliament was short-lived, as he collapsed and died suddenly in September 1902, aged only 35. The cause of death was believed to be heart disease.

Parliament of Western Australia
New seat	Member for Hannans; 1901–1902	Succeeded by Thomas Bath
