= Westralian Worker =

Newspaper in Western Australia

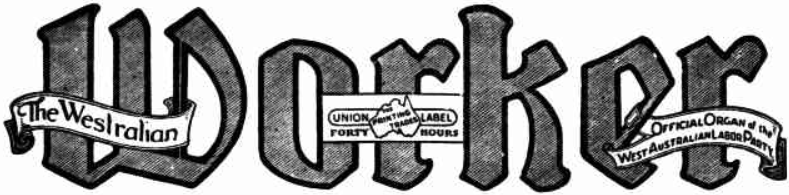
- Type: Weekly
- Founded: 7 September 1900
- Ceased publication: 22 June 1951
- Political alignment: Western Australian Labor Party
- Language: English
- City: Kalgoorlie, Western Australia (until 1912); Perth, Western Australia
- Country: Australia

The Westralian Worker was a newspaper established in Kalgoorlie, Western Australia in 1900 and published until its demise in 1951 in Perth, Western Australia.

== History ==
It was established as the Official organ of the Western Australian Labor Party – with the subtitle of "A journal devoted to the interest of trade unionism, co-operation and labour in politics".

In April 1912 it was moved to Perth and was published by the Westralian Worker Printing and Publishing Company. In 1915 the Worker and People's Printing and Publishing Company amalgamated. The company also published union books and pamphlets as well as the Westralian Worker.

The company was involved in broadcasting with interest in the Perth radio station 6KY.

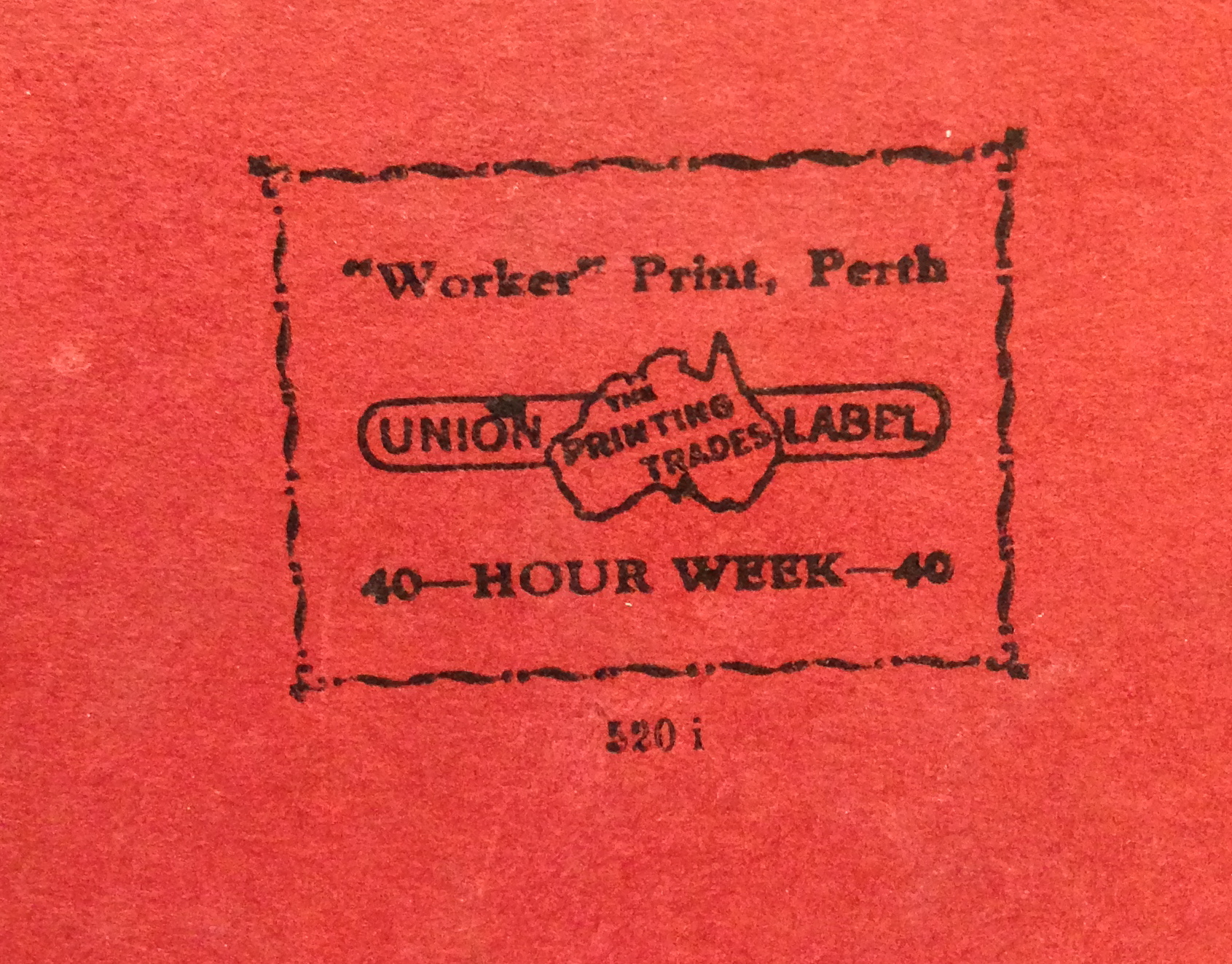
Printers mark found on rear of railway union booklet circa 1935

The newspaper attempted to balance views between conscriptionists and anti-conscriptionists in World War I, but eventually became a mouthpiece for the anti-conscriptionists.

The editorial policy included tackling perceived biases of other Western Australian newspapers.

The newspaper was based in Holman House. The newspaper ceased publication in 1951.

== Notable editors ==
- Thomas Bath (1901–1902)
- Wallace Nelson (1902–1903)
- Julian Stuart (1903)
- John Curtin (1917–1928)
- Fred Gates (1928–1937)

== Publishing details ==
- Vol. 1, no. 1 (7 Sept. 1900)-no. 2219 (Friday, 22 June 1951)
