= Scott Leary (politician) =

Western Australian politician

Scott Leary MLA

Member of the Western Australian Legislative Assembly for Albany
- Incumbent
- Assumed office 8 March 2025
- Preceded by: Rebecca Stephens

Personal details
- Party: National
- Website: https://www.nationalswa.com/our-team/scott-leary/

Scott Leary is an Australian politician from the National Party who is member of the Western Australian Legislative Assembly for the electoral district of Albany. He won his seat at the 2025 Western Australian state election. He succeeded Rebecca Stephens. He contested the same seat unsuccessfully in 2021.

Western Australian Legislative Assembly
Preceded by Rebecca Stephens	Member for Albany; 2025–present	Incumbent
