= Harry McCulloch =

Australian politician

Harry McCulloch MM

Member of the Legislative Assembly of Western Australia
- In office 26 February 1949 – 7 April 1956
- Preceded by: David Leahy
- Succeeded by: None (seat abolished)
- Constituency: Hannans

Personal details
- Born: 23 June 1893 Bonnybridge, Stirlingshire, Scotland
- Died: 13 March 1971 (aged 77) Perth, Western Australia, Australia
- Party: Labor

Herbert Alexander "Harry" McCulloch MM (23 June 1893 – 13 March 1971) was an Australian trade unionist and politician who was a Labor Party member of the Legislative Assembly of Western Australia from 1949 to 1956, representing the seat of Hannans.

McCulloch was born in Bonnybridge, Stirlingshire, Scotland, to Agnes (née Morrison) and Thomas McCulloch. He left school at an early age to work as a coal miner, and then later enlisted in the British Army. He served in Africa and Europe during World War I, holding the rank of battalion sergeant major, and was both mentioned in despatches and awarded the Military Medal. After the war's end, McCulloch returned to coal mining. He emigrated to Western Australia in 1928, and settled in Kalgoorlie, working as a truck driver and municipal employee. He served as secretary of the local trades hall from 1943 to 1949. McCulloch entered parliament at the 1949 Hannans by-election, caused by the death of David Leahy. He was re-elected at the 1950 and 1953 state elections. He left parliament when his seat was abolished prior to the 1956 election, and died in Perth in March 1971, aged 77. McCulloch had married Agnes Burt Montgomery in 1921, with whom he had two children.

Parliament of Western Australia
Preceded by David Leahy	Member for Hannans; 1948–1956	Abolished
