= Eastern Goldfields Trades and Labour Council =

Trade union regional organisation in Goldfields region of Western Australia

The Eastern Goldfields Trades and Labour Council was a trades and labour council (TLC) based in the Eastern Goldfields of Western Australia.

The first Western Australian trades and labour council conference had been held in Coolgardie in 1899. The Eastern Goldfields was the council for trade unions in the goldfields in Western Australia. It attempted to mediate and act for a range of trade unions based in Kalgoorlie-Boulder and nearby localities.

It was an organiser of social events such as eight hour day celebratory picnics at Mungari.
