= Wallace Nelson =

Australian politician (1856–1943)

Member of the Western Australian Legislative Assembly for Hannans
- In office 28 June 1904 – 27 October 1905
- Preceded by: Thomas Bath
- Succeeded by: Francis Ware

Personal details
- Born: Wallace Alexander Nelson; 29 April 1856 Aberdeen, Scotland
- Died: 5 May 1943 (aged 87) Wollstonecraft, Sydney, New South Wales, Australia
- Party: Labor Party

Wallace Alexander Nelson (29 April 1856 – 5 May 1943) was a short term Western Australian politician. He represented the electoral district of Hannans from 1904 to 1905 in the Western Australian Legislative Assembly. He was described as the wit and humorist of the Labor Party in those days, having much experience at oration and writing. He later moved on to editing newspapers, and writing books.

== Biography ==
Born in Aberdeen, Scotland, Nelson had been ordered to relocate to a warmer climate by his doctor in Sheffield, England the 1880s, and subsequently immigrated to Brisbane and then Rockhampton. While there, he unsuccessfully contested the Federal Seat of Capricornia in the 1901 Federal election, which was won by Alexander Paterson with a margin of 139 votes. He then moved to Kalgoorlie, Western Australia.

In Kalgoorlie, he was editor of the Westralian Worker until December 1902, having taken over from Thomas Bath, then the Kalgoorlie Sun and Figaro. After his stint in parliament he moved to Perth, where he edited the Perth Democrat, was leader writer for the Daily News and contributed to the literary journal Leeuwin. After two years in England, he moved to Sydney in 1916 where he edited the Australasian Manufacturer until a few months before his death in 1943.

Nelson was an official lecturer on the Great White Train tour of New South Wales country towns in 1925–26.

He was also the author of a number of books.

== Notes ==
Western Australian Legislative Assembly
Preceded by Thomas Bath	Member for Hannans; 1904–1905	Succeeded by Francis Thomas Ware
