= Peter Watson (politician) =

Western Australian politician and middle-distance runner

The Honourable Peter Watson OAM

30th Speaker of the Western Australian Legislative Assembly
- In office 11 May 2017 – 29 April 2021
- Preceded by: Michael Sutherland
- Succeeded by: Michelle Roberts

Member of the Western Australian Parliament for Albany
- In office 10 February 2001 – 29 January 2021
- Preceded by: Kevin Prince
- Succeeded by: Rebecca Stephens

Personal details
- Born: Peter Bruce Watson; 30 May 1947 (age 79) Reservoir, Victoria
- Citizenship: Australian
- Party: Labor Party
- Occupation: Postal worker
- Website: web.archive.org/web/20201124001017/http://www.peterwatson.walabor.org.au/ (Archive)

Peter Bruce Watson (born 30 May 1947) is an Australian politician. He was a Labor Party member of the Western Australian Legislative Assembly from February 2001 to March 2021, representing the electorate of Albany.

Watson was born in the Melbourne suburb of Reservoir. After arriving in Western Australia in 1961, Watson attended Perth Modern School and took up athletics. He excelled at the 1500m event and won the Australian title in 1968 and again in 1973. Watson was the third West Australian, after Herb Elliott and Keith Wheeler, to break the four-minute mile. He represented Australia at the 1968 Summer Olympics and the 1974 Commonwealth Games.

Employed at Australia Post, Watson held various positions, including postal manager, before entering politics. He was successful at the 2001 Western Australian state election, defeating the sitting member, Kevin Prince, and was re-elected in 2005.

At the 2008 election, electoral boundary changes resulting from the adoption of the one-vote one-value principle meant that substantial rural areas were included in the electorate, and it became notionally Liberal. Watson won the seat by 89 votes.

In both the 2008 and 2013 elections, Watson accomplished the feat of winning in the face of swings against the Australian Labor Party in the state as a whole.

Watson retained the seat again at the 2017 election with a swing toward him of 1.8%, winning the seat by 4.1% after preferences. Watson was appointed Speaker of the Legislative Assembly on 11 May 2017.

He was awarded the Medal of the Order of Australia in the 2026 King's Birthday Honours for "service to the people and Parliament of Western Australia".

Western Australian Legislative Assembly
Preceded by Kevin Prince	Member for Albany; 2001–2021	Succeeded by Rebecca Stephens
Preceded by Michael Sutherland	Speaker of the Western Australian Legislative Assembly; 2017–2021	Succeeded by Michelle Roberts
