= Kevin Prince (politician) =

Australian politician

Antony Kevin Royston Prince (born 2 February 1948) is a former Australian politician.

He was born in Oxford and arrived in Western Australia in 1964. He was a solicitor before entering politics. In 1993 he was elected to the Western Australian Legislative Assembly as the member for Albany. In 1994 he was appointed Minister for Aboriginal Affairs and Housing, exchanging Housing for Health in 1995. In 1998 he moved to Police and Emergency Services, which portfolio he held until his defeat in 2001.

Following his retirement from politics he resumed his career as a criminal lawyer based in Albany.

Western Australian Legislative Assembly
Preceded by Leon Watt	Member for Albany; 1993–2001	Succeeded by Peter Watson
