= Selby Munsie =

Australian politician

The Honourable Selby Munsie

Member of the Legislative Assembly of Western Australia
- In office 3 October 1911 – 12 March 1938
- Preceded by: Francis Ware
- Succeeded by: David Leahy
- Constituency: Hannans

Personal details
- Born: 23 September 1870 near Armidale, New South Wales, Australia
- Died: 12 March 1938 (aged 67) Subiaco, Western Australia, Australia
- Party: Labor

Selby Walter Munsie (23 September 1870 – 12 March 1938) was an Australian politician who was a Labor Party member of the Legislative Assembly of Western Australia from 1911 until his death, representing the seat of Hannans. He served as a minister in the governments of Philip Collier and John Willcock.

Munsie was born near Armidale, New South Wales, to Anna Maria (née Richardson) and Alexander Welch Munsie. He was educated in Newcastle, and later worked for a period in the timber trade at nearby Wallsend. Munsie came to Western Australia in 1895 to work on the goldfields, living first at Paddington and later in Kalgoorlie. He eventually became president of the Federated Miners' Union (a forerunner of the national CFMEU). At the 1911 state election, Munsie was elected to parliament, replacing the retiring Francis Ware as the member for the seat of Hannans. After Labor's victory at the 1924 election, he was appointed a minister without portfolio in the new ministry formed by Philip Collier. He was given a substantive position after the 1927 election, replacing Frank Troy as Minister for Mines and John Drew as Minister for Health. Labor were defeated at the 1930 election, but were only out of office for a short period, returning in a landslide at the 1933 election. Munsie regained his old portfolios, and retained them when John Willcock replaced Philip Collier as premier in 1936. He died in Perth in March 1938, after an illness of about two months, and was granted a state funeral.

Parliament of Western Australia
Preceded by Francis Ware	Member for Hannans; 1911–1938	Succeeded by David Leahy
Political offices
Preceded by Frank Troy; Charles Latham	Minister for Mines; 1927–1930; 1933–1938	Succeeded by Charles Latham; Alexander Panton
Preceded by John Drew; John Scaddan	Minister for Health; 1927–1930; 1933–1938	Succeeded by John Scaddan; Alexander Panton
