= Charles Keyser =

Australian politician

Charles Christopher Keyser (6 December 1871 – 30 October 1965) was a member of the Western Australian Legislative Assembly from 1904 to 1905.

Born at a timber station in Busselton, Charles Keyser was the son of American timber contractor and master builder Charles Donat Keyser. Apprenticed in the printing trade, he followed a variety of professions in his youth. On 21 April 1898, he married Lucy Sanderson in Ballarat, Victoria. They had three sons and five daughters.

In 1898, Keyser was appointed assistant to the Town Clerk of the Town of Albany, serving as acting Town Clerk in 1901. Keyser became active in the Labour movement, joining the Labor Party and helping to form an Albany branch of the Political Labour League. At the June 1904 election, he was elected to the Western Australian Legislative Assembly seat of Albany. He held the seat until the election of 27 October 1905, when he was defeated by Edward Barnett.

From 1906 to 1911, Keyser was secretary of the Greenbushes Road Board. He was then Town Clerk of the Municipality of Wagin until 1929, during which time he unsuccessfully contested the Legislative Assembly seat of Wagin at the 1917 election. He was secretary of the Murray Road Board from 1929 until his retirement in 1935. He then moved to Victoria, dying at Bentleigh on 30 October 1965.
