= Rebecca Stephens (politician) =

Australian politician

Member of the Western Australian Legislative Assembly for Albany
- In office 13 March 2021 – 8 March 2025
- Preceded by: Peter Watson
- Succeeded by: Scott Leary

Personal details
- Born: 3 March 1983 (age 43) Albany, Western Australia
- Party: Labor
- Website: www.rebeccastephens.net.au

Rebecca Sue Stephens (born 3 March 1983) is an Australian former politician. She was a Labor member of the Western Australian Legislative Assembly for Albany from the 2021 state election until her defeat in 2025.

The first woman elected to the seat of Albany and also the first Albany born member. She operated a hairdressing business from the age of 23, and at the time of her election to parliament was the regional manager of employment organisation Worklink WA. She was elected to Albany City Council in 2017. She has also been a member of the executive committee of the Albany Chamber of Commerce and an active member of the Albany Surf Lifesaving Club.

In the 2025 Western Australian state election, she was unseated by Nationals candidate Scott Leary.

Western Australian Legislative Assembly
Preceded by Peter Watson	Member for Albany; 2021–2025	Succeeded by Scott Leary
