= Alfred Watts (Western Australian politician) =

Western Australian politician

Member of the Legislative Assembly of Western Australia
- In office 28 June 1904 – 27 October 1905
- Preceded by: George Throssell
- Succeeded by: James Mitchell
- Constituency: Northam

Personal details
- Born: 14 October 1873 Lowan County, Victoria, Australia
- Died: 3 August 1954 (aged 80) Safety Bay, Western Australia, Australia
- Party: Labor

Alfred John Henry Watts (14 October 1873 – 3 August 1954) was an Australian politician who was a Labor Party member of the Legislative Assembly of Western Australia from 1904 to 1905, representing the seat of Northam.

== Early life ==
Watts was born in Lowan County, Victoria, to Caroline Rokasky and Alfred Watts. He moved to Western Australia in 1896, initially living in Perth and later moving to Northam in 1901, where he ran a land agency.

== Political career ==
Watts was elected to parliament at the 1904 state election, replacing the retiring George Throssell (a former premier). He was one of a number of Labor MPs elected in previously non-Labor seats, a situation which allowed the Labor Party to form government in Western Australia for the first time. However, Watts's time in parliament was short-lived, as he was defeated by James Mitchell (a future premier) at the early 1905 election. He recontested the seat unsuccessfully at the 1908 and 1911 elections, and in 1907 also ran for the Labor Party in a legislative council by-election, losing to George Throssell in East Province.

== Personal life ==
Watts moved to Waeel (near Cunderdin) in 1922, and eventually retired to Safety Bay (on the southern outskirts of Perth), where he died in 1954 at the age of 80. He had married twice, having a daughter by his first wife and eight children by his second.

Parliament of Western Australia
Preceded by George Foley	Member for Northam; 1904–1905	Succeeded by Ernest Cowan
