= Roland Paver =

South African cricketer

Personal information
- Full name: Roland George Lyall Paver
- Born: 4 April 1950 (age 76); Johannesburg, Transvaal, South Africa
- Batting: Right-handed
- Role: Wicket-keeper

Domestic team information
- Years: Team
- 1972–1974: Oxford University

Career statistics
Competition	First-class	List A
Matches	16	4
Runs scored	290	19
Batting average	12.08	4.75
100s/50s	–/–	–/–
Top score	34	14
Catches/stumpings	33/5	5/1
- Source: Cricinfo, 24 April 2020

Roland George Lyall Paver (born 4 April 1950) is a South African former first-class cricketer.

Paver was born at Johannesburg. He was educated in the city at The Ridge School, before going up as a Rhodes Scholar to Pembroke College at the University of Oxford. While studying at Oxford, he played first-class cricket for Oxford University, making his debut against Essex at Oxford in 1972. He played first-class cricket for Oxford until 1972, making sixteen appearances, two of which included playing in The University Matches against Cambridge in 1973 and 1974. Playing as a wicket-keeper, he scored 290 runs at an average of 12.08 and a high score of 34, while behind the stumps he took 33 catches and made five stumpings. In addition to playing first-class cricket for the university, Paver also appeared in four List A one-day matches for Oxford in the 1973 Benson & Hedges Cup. Paver later emigrated to Australia, where he lives in Albany, Western Australia.
