= David Leahy =

Australian politician

Member of the Legislative Assembly of Western Australia
- In office 23 April 1938 – 19 December 1948
- Preceded by: Selby Munsie
- Succeeded by: Harry McCulloch
- Constituency: Hannans

Personal details
- Born: 19 October 1883 Castleisland, County Kerry, Ireland
- Died: 19 December 1948 (aged 65) Victoria Park, Western Australia, Australia
- Party: Labor

David Joseph Leahy (19 October 1883 – 19 December 1948) was an Australian trade unionist and politician who was a Labor Party member of the Legislative Assembly of Western Australia from 1938 until his death, representing the seat of Hannans.

Leahy was born in Castleisland, County Kerry, Ireland, to Margaret (née Reidy) and David Leahy. His parents emigrated to Australia when he was a child, and he was raised in Kyneton, Victoria. Leahy moved to Western Australia in 1906, and began working as a miner in the Sandstone area. He later moved to the Eastern Goldfields, living for periods in Kalgoorlie and Boulder and working as an official with a gold miners' union. Leahy entered parliament at the 1938 Hannans by-election, caused by the death of Labor government minister Selby Munsie. He was re-elected at the 1939, 1943, and 1947 elections, but died in office in December 1948, aged 65, after a long illness. Leahy had married Sophie Fongo in 1912, with whom he had five children.

Parliament of Western Australia
Preceded by Selby Munsie	Member for Hannans; 1938–1948	Succeeded by Harry McCulloch
