= Edward Charles Barnett =

Australian politician

Edward Barnett

Member of the Legislative Assembly of Western Australia
- In office 27 October 1905 – 30 August 1909
- Preceded by: Charles Keyser
- Succeeded by: William Price
- Constituency: Albany

Personal details
- Born: 3 December 1854 London, England
- Died: 21 May 1922 (aged 67) Fitzroy, Victoria, Australia

Edward Charles Barnett (3 December 1854 – 21 May 1922) was an Australian businessman and politician who was a member of the Legislative Assembly of Western Australia from 1905 to 1909, representing the seat of Albany.

Barnett was born in London, England, to Amelia (née Stewart) and John Barnett. His parents moved to Victoria when he was a small child, and after leaving school worked for a merchant firm in Kingower. Barnett moved to Western Australia in 1881, and began working as a storekeeper in Jarrahdale. He relocated to Albany in 1886, where he had his own merchant firm and later opened branches in Denmark and Hopetoun. Barnett became president of the local chamber of commerce, and also served three terms on the Albany Municipal Council (1893 to 1899, 1901 to 1903, and 1904 to 1905). He entered parliament at the 1905 state election, defeating the sitting member, Charles Keyser. Both he and Keyser were members of the Ministerialist faction. Barnett was re-elected at the 1908 election with an increased majority, but resigned in August 1909 in order to take an extended business trip to England. He retired to the eastern states in 1913, and died in Melbourne in May 1922, aged 67. He was unmarried.

Parliament of Western Australia
Preceded by Charles Keyser	Member for Albany; 1905–1909	Succeeded by William Price
