= William Price (Australian politician) =

Australian politician

Member of the Legislative Assembly of Western Australia
- In office 18 September 1909 – 29 September 1917
- Preceded by: Edward Barnett
- Succeeded by: Herbert Robinson
- Constituency: Albany

Personal details
- Born: 16 April 1869 Chepstow, Monmouthshire, Wales
- Died: 22 June 1937 (aged 68) Fitzroy, Victoria, Australia
- Party: Labor

Richard William Price (16 April 1869 – 22 June 1937) was an Australian journalist, politician, and army officer. He was a Labor Party member of the Legislative Assembly of Western Australia from 1909 to 1917, representing the seat of Albany.

== Early life ==
Price was born in Chepstow, Monmouthshire, Wales, to Jane (née Croatt) and Henry George Price. He emigrated to Australia in 1885, initially living in Brisbane and then finding work in outback Queensland. By 1889, Price was working as an organiser for the General Labourers Union of West Queensland. He moved to Forbes, New South Wales, a few years later, and filled a similar role for the Amalgamated Shearers' Union of Australasia. Price came to Western Australia in 1896, during the gold rush, and subsequently founded branches of the Australian Workers' Union at Leonora and Mount Morgans.

== Journalism and politics ==
Price was working as a journalist by 1903, and the following year began working for the Kalgoorlie Sun. He moved to Perth in 1905, and began writing for Truth, a local newspaper. Price entered parliament at the 1909 Albany by-election, caused by the resignation of Edward Barnett. He had initially been preselected as the Labor candidate for the Division of Swan at the 1910 federal election, but withdrew in order to run at the by-election. Price was re-elected at the 1911 and 1914 state elections, but did not recontest his seat in 1917 due to being on active duty overseas.

== Military career and later life ==
In July 1915, while still a member of parliament, Price enlisted in the Australian Imperial Force. He was initially posted to the 28th Battalion, but later transferred to the 47th Battalion. Price was gassed at the Battle of Pozières in 1916, and invalided to England. He spent the rest of the war as a training officer and camp commandant, and was then involved in demobilisation, not being formally discharged until September 1920. Price began working as a journalist after leaving the military, initially working out of London for the Empire Parliamentary Association and later living in Aberavon, Wales. He returned to Western Australia in 1930, and died in Perth in 1937, aged 68.

Parliament of Western Australia
Preceded by Edward Barnett	Member for Albany; 1909–1917	Succeeded by Herbert Robinson
