= Herbert Robinson (Western Australian politician) =

Australian politician

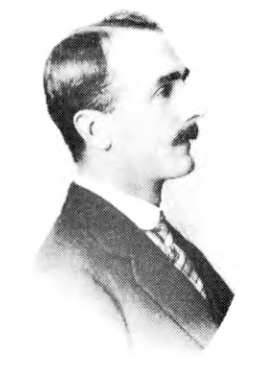

Member of the Legislative Assembly of Western Australia
- In office 29 September 1917 – 2 May 1919
- Preceded by: William Price
- Succeeded by: John Scaddan
- Constituency: Albany

Personal details
- Born: 29 December 1876 Red Hill, Victoria, Australia
- Died: 2 May 1919 (aged 42) Perth, Western Australia, Australia
- Party: Nationalist

Herbert Robinson (29 December 1876 – 2 May 1919) was an Australian politician who was a Nationalist member of the Legislative Assembly of Western Australia from 1917 until his death, representing the seat of Albany.

Robinson was born in Red Hill, Victoria, to Irish parents, Margaret (née Thomson) and John Robinson. His family moved to Albany, Western Australia, in June 1878, where he spent his early childhood. He and his older brother, Robert Thomson Robinson (also a future MP), were both sent to Adelaide to be educated, attending Prince Alfred College. After leaving school, Robinson returned to Albany to work for Drew Robinson & Co., his father's department store. He eventually became a junior partner in the store. In November 1912, Robinson was elected Mayor of Albany, serving until November 1915. Joining the newly created Nationalist Party, he successfully stood for parliament at the 1917 state election, defeating a former premier, John Scaddan. He joined his brother, the member for Canning, as a member of parliament. Robinson died in Perth in May 1919, aged only 42. He had moved there to aid his recovery from an ongoing illness, with his death having been preceded several months of declining health.
