= Francis Ware =

Australian politician

Member of the Legislative Assembly of Western Australia
- In office 27 October 1905 – 3 October 1911
- Preceded by: Wallace Nelson
- Succeeded by: Selby Munsie
- Constituency: Hannans

Personal details
- Born: 13 September 1874 Ballarat, Victoria, Australia
- Died: 13 October 1929 (aged 55) Perth, Western Australia, Australia
- Party: Labor

Francis John Ware (13 September 1874 – 13 October 1929) was an Australian trade unionist and politician who served as a Labor Party member of the Legislative Assembly of Western Australia from 1905 to 1911, representing the seat of Hannans.

Ware was born in Ballarat, Victoria, to Maria (née Sly) and John Bowhay Ware. After leaving school, he was apprenticed to a tailor in Ballarat. He arrived in Western Australia in 1898, in the aftermath of the gold rush, and established his own business in Kalgoorlie. Ware was prominent in the Clothing Trades Union, and from 1902 to 1905 was president of the trades and labour council for the Eastern Goldfields. He was elected to parliament at the 1905 state election, having won the Labor preselection ballot for Hannans unopposed after the withdrawal of the sitting member, Wallace Nelson. Ware was re-elected at the 1908 election, but did not recontest his seat at the 1911 election and was replaced by Selby Munsie. He moved to Perth after leaving politics, opening a tailor's shop in Subiaco. Ware died in October 1929, after being run over by a motorist in Murray Street. He had married Caroline Elizabeth Wulff in 1906, with whom he had six children.

Parliament of Western Australia
Preceded by Wallace Nelson	Member for Hannans; 1905–1911	Succeeded by Selby Munsie
