= Electoral district of Hannans =

Former electoral district in Western Australia

Hannans Western Australia—Legislative Assembly
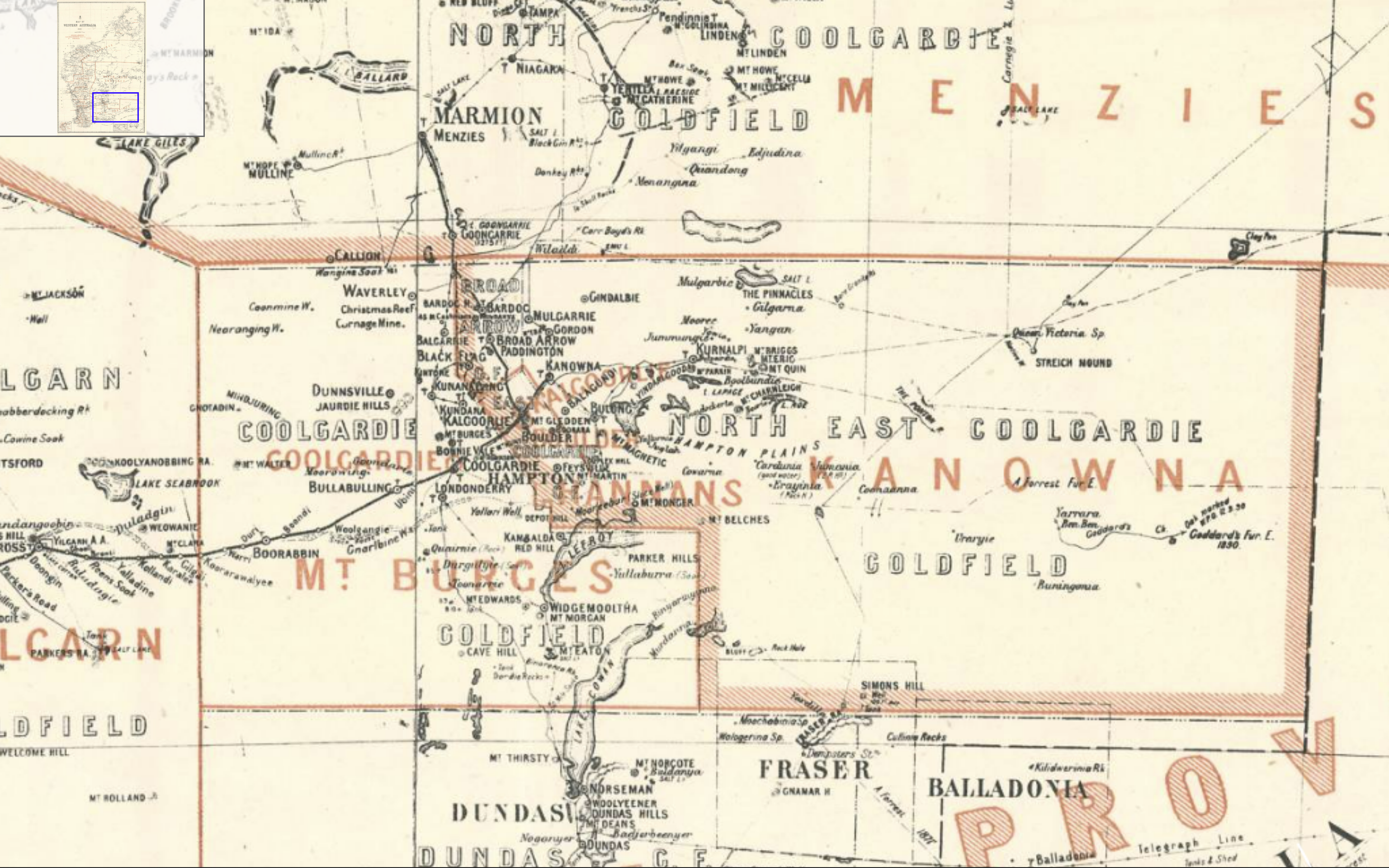
- Hannans and surrounds, 1900
- State: Western Australia
- Dates current: 1901–1956
- Namesake: Paddy Hannan

Hannans was an electoral district of the Legislative Assembly in the Australian state of Western Australia from 1901 to 1956.

The district was located on the Eastern Goldfields and was based in the mining districts surrounding Kalgoorlie. It was one of several districts created for the 1901 election at the 1899 redistribution. Upon its creation, it took in the outskirts of Kalgoorlie and Boulder as well as the towns of Feysville and Boorara. While the mostly immigrant population had been in the area for some time, they only got the right to vote at the election due to changes in the electoral law which modified residency requirements.

The seat was at all times held by the Labor Party. It was abolished before the 1956 election in a redistribution, and its area was split between the Kalgoorlie and Boulder electorates.

== Members ==
Member	Party	Term
John Reside	Labour	1901–1902
Thomas Bath	Labour	1902–1904
Wallace Nelson	Labour	1904–1905
Francis Ware	Labour	1905–1911
Selby Munsie	Labor	1911–1938
David Leahy	Labor	1938–1948
Harry McCulloch	Labor	1948–1956
