= Electoral district of Albany =

State electoral district of Western Australia

Albany Western Australia—Legislative Assembly
- Interactive map of electoral district boundaries from the 2025 state election
- State: Western Australia
- Dates current: 1890–present
- MP: Scott Leary
- Party: Nationals
- Namesake: Albany
- Electors: 33,868 (2025)
- Area: 9,814 km^{2} (3,789.2 sq mi)
- Demographic: Provincial
- Coordinates: 34.67°S 117.79°E
Electorates around Albany:
Roe	Roe	Roe
Warren-Blackwood	Albany	Great Australian Bight
Great Australian Bight	Great Australian Bight	Great Australian Bight

Albany is a Legislative Assembly electorate in the state of Western Australia. Albany is named for the port and regional city of Western Australia which falls within its borders. It is one of the oldest electorates in Western Australia, with its first member having been elected in the inaugural 1890 elections of the Legislative Assembly. It is regarded as a swinging seat, and has been held by the Western Australian National Party since the 2025 election.

== Geography ==
The electoral district of Albany, as of 2023, contains the entirely of the City of Albany and the Shire of Plantagenet (including the town of Mount Barker). It also contains the areas of the Shires of Cranbook and Gnowangerup within the Stirling Range National Park.

== History ==
At the 2007 redistribution, the electoral district of Albany had the same boundaries as the City of Albany, including Albany and its suburbs, the nearby towns of Elleker, Kalgan, Lower King, Torbay. This represented a significant expansion of its boundaries, in part due to the "one-vote one-value" electoral legislation which largely abolished malapportionment between country and metropolitan electorates in the Legislative Assembly. Prior to 2007, the electorate was largely limited to Albany and its suburbs—the additional sections were within the now abolished electorate of Stirling.

By the 2015 redistribution, the electoral district of Albany contains the entirety of two local government areas: the City of Albany, and the Shire of Jerramungup. The distribution in 2023 resulted in Albany expanding further to absorb the relatively populous but conservative-leaning Shire of Plantagenet.

Albany was held by the Labor Party since the 2001 election, at which Peter Watson was first elected. Watson announced his retirement prior to the 2021 election and was succeeded in the seat by Labor Party colleague, Rebecca Stephens. Stephens held the seat for one term before losing the seat in the 2025 election to the Nationals WA challenger Scott Leary in a three-person competition.

== Members for Albany ==
Member	Party	Term
Lancel de Hamel	Oppositionist	1890–1894
George Leake	Oppositionist	1894–1900
John Hassell	Oppositionist	1900–1901
James Gardiner	Oppositionist	1901–1904
Charles Keyser	Labor	1904–1905
Charles Keyser	Ministerialist	1905
Edward Barnett	Ministerialist	1905–1909
William Price	Labor	1909–1917
Herbert Robinson	Nationalist	1917–1919
John Scaddan	Nationalist	1919–1920
John Scaddan	Country	1920–1923
John Scaddan	Country (MCP)	1923–1924
Arthur Wansbrough	Labor	1924–1936
Leonard Hill	Country	1936–1956
Jack Hall	Labor	1956–1970
Wyndham Cook	Labor	1970–1974
Leon Watt	Liberal	1974–1993
Kevin Prince	Liberal	1993–2001
Peter Watson	Labor	2001–2021
Rebecca Stephens	Labor	2021–2025
Scott Leary	National	2025–present

== Election results ==
2025 Western Australian state election: Albany
Party	Candidate	Votes	%	±%
Labor	Rebecca Stephens	8,825	29.9	−18.8
National	Scott Leary	6,496	22.0	+7.4
Liberal	Tom Brough	6,451	21.8	+4.8
Greens	Lynn MacLaren	2,348	7.9	+2.4
Independent	Mario Lionetti	2,121	7.2	+7.2
Christians	Gerrit Ballast	1,504	5.1	+0.4
One Nation	Quintin Bisschoff	813	2.8	+0.2
Legalise Cannabis	Philip Arnatt	693	2.3	+0.5
Shooters, Fishers, Farmers	Synjon Anstee-Brook	311	1.1	−1.3
Total formal votes		29,562	96.6	−0.0
Informal votes		1,050	3.4	+0.0
Turnout		30,612	90.4	+5.2
Two-candidate-preferred result
National	Scott Leary	16,615	56.3	+56.3
Labor	Rebecca Stephens	12,914	43.7	−17.3
National gain from Labor				
