= Electoral district of Brown Hill =

Former electoral district in Western Australia

Brown Hill Western Australia—Legislative Assembly
- State: Western Australia
- Dates current: 1904–1911
- Demographic: Goldfields (Urban)

The Electoral district of Brown Hill was a Legislative Assembly electorate in the state of Western Australia. It was named for a local land feature, and covered part of the Goldfields city of Boulder, near Kalgoorlie. It was created at the 1904 redistribution and was merged in 1911 with the neighbouring seat of Ivanhoe to form the Electoral district of Brown Hill-Ivanhoe. The only Member for Brown Hill was Thomas Bath of the Labor Party.

== Members for Brown Hill ==
Member	Party	Term
Thomas Bath	Labor	1904–1911
