= Thomas Bath =

Australian politician

The Honourable Thomas Bath CBE
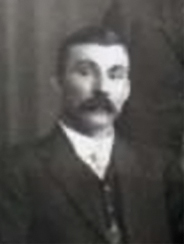

Leader of the Opposition of Western Australia
- In office 22 November 1905 – 3 August 1910
- Premier: Newton Moore
- Preceded by: William Johnson
- Succeeded by: John Scaddan

Minister for Education of Western Australia
- In office 7 June 1905 – 25 August 1905
- Premier: Henry Daglish
- Preceded by: Henry Daglish
- Succeeded by: Walter Kingsmill

Member of the Western Australian Parliament for Hannans
- In office 1902–1904
- Preceded by: John Reside
- Succeeded by: Wallace Nelson

Member of the Western Australian Parliament for Brown Hill
- In office 1904–1911
- Preceded by: Constituency established
- Succeeded by: Constituency abolished

Member of the Western Australian Parliament for Avon
- In office 1911–1914
- Preceded by: Constituency established
- Succeeded by: Tom Harrison

Personal details
- Born: 21 February 1875 Hill End, New South Wales
- Died: 6 November 1956 (aged 81) Mount Lawley, Western Australia, Australia
- Party: Labor Party

Thomas Henry Bath, CBE (21 February 1875 – 6 November 1956) was an Australian politician, trade unionist, newspaper editor, writer, and cooperativist. A member of the Labor Party, he served as a Member of the Western Australian Legislative Assembly between 1902 and 1914 for the constituencies of Hannans, Brown Hill and Avon, and was also Minister for Education for a period of 79 days in 1905, and Leader of the Opposition between 1906 and 1910. In later life, Bath was involved in the establishment of the University of Western Australia, and also initiated several agricultural cooperatives.

== Early life ==
Bath was born to Thomas Henry Richard Bath, a miner, and his wife Sarah Ann Bath (née Barrow), on 21 February 1875, at Hill End, New South Wales, a mining town in the Blue Mountains.

He emigrated to the Western Australian Goldfields in 1896, and found work as a miner. The following year, after a brief sojourn in New South Wales, Bath was involved in founding the Amalgamated Workers' Association. In 1898, he was asked to head the local chapter of the Knights of Labor, a United-States–based labour organisation, which he represented at the 1899 trade union conference, held in Coolgardie.

In September 1900, Bath, despite having no formal training in writing, became the first editor of the Westralian Worker, a socialist publication. In July of the following year, Bath gave way to Wallace Nelson.

He married his wife, Elizabeth Maria Jane, in 1904.

== Political career ==
Before entering Parliament, he was the Secretary of the Trades and Labor Council in Western Australia. After being appointed secretary of the Kalgoorlie and Boulder Trades and Labor Council, Bath was involved in various faction-fighting between trade unions.

Bath began his political career in 1902 being elected as the Member for Hannans in the Western Australian Legislative Assembly as part of the Labor Party.

He was re-elected, unopposed, for the new seat of Brown Hill in 1904. Bath was first appointed as the Chairman of Committees in the Legislative Assembly, but relinquished the office when he became the Minister for Education in 1905, as well as the Minister for Lands.

When the Daglish Ministry was subject to a vote of no confidence and collapsed in August 1905, Bath was elected unanimously as the leader of the Labor Party. As a result, he became the Leader of the Opposition. He was re-elected, again unopposed, for the seat of Brown Hill in 1908. While acting as the Leader of the Opposition, he opposed an attempt to introduce public school fees for over 14 year olds, supporting free education from early childhood to university. He was also involved in the establishment of the University of Western Australia and served on its Senate from 1912 to 1919.

Bath resigned as Leader of the Opposition in 1910, noting the "inadequacy of payment" for Parliamentarians, and noting that he was intending to retire as the member for Brown Hill at the end of his term. He was convinced to run for the party in the new seat of Avon in 1911. He was elected over a Ministerialist candidate and became the Minister for Lands and Agriculture. He retired from politics in 1914.

== Later life and legacy ==
After retiring from Parliament, he returned to farming and became a trustee of the Wheat Pool of Western Australia.

Bath was the foundation president of the Shakespeare Club and was also involved in the Perth Repertory Society. Bath was a leading member of the Freemasons in Western Australia, and was involved in the foundation of Lodge Bonnie Doon, 839, S.C., in 1897, under the Scottish Rite.

He was made a Commander of the Order of the British Empire in 1949, for "long service to the wheatgrowing industry of the state". He died at his home in Mount Lawley on 6 November 1956 from a heart attack resulting from coronary occlusion. He was survived by his wife, son and two daughters.

Bath Lane, one of the minor roads in the Ballarat CBD, was named after him.

Political offices
Preceded by Henry Daglish	Minister for Education; 1905	Succeeded by Walter Kingsmill
Preceded by William Johnson	Leader of the Opposition; 1906–1910	Succeeded by John Scaddan
Party political offices
Preceded by William Johnson	Leader of the Labor Party in Western Australia; 1906–1910	Succeeded by John Scaddan
Western Australian Legislative Assembly
Preceded by John Reside	Member of Parliament for Hannans; 1902–1904	Succeeded by Wallace Nelson
Constituency established	Member of Parliament for Brown Hill; 1904–1911	Constituency abolished
Constituency established	Member of Parliament for Avon; 1911–1914	Succeeded by Tom Harrison
