= 1908 Western Australian state election =

State election in Western Australia in 1908

- 11 September – 23 October 1908

All 50 seats in the Western Australian Legislative Assembly
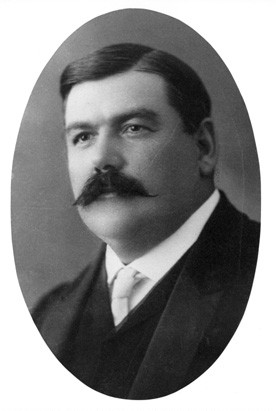

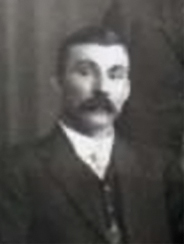
	First party	Second party
Leader	Newton Moore	Thomas Bath
Party	Ministerialist	Labor
Leader since	7 May 1906	22 November 1905
Leader's seat	Bunbury	Brown Hill
Last election	33 seats	14 seats
Seats won	28 seats	22 seats
Seat change	▼5	▲8
Percentage	61.62%	37.80%
Swing	▲7.78	▲2.73
Premier before election
Newton Moore
Ministerialist
Elected Premier
Newton Moore
Ministerialist

Elections were held in the Australian state of Western Australia in late 1908 to elect 50 members to the state's Legislative Assembly. The main polling day was 11 September, although five remote electorates went to the polls at later dates.

The governing Ministerialists (led by the premier, Newton Moore) lost five seats, but retained a majority government. The Labour Party, led by Thomas Bath, gained eight seats for a total of 22, equalling their record set at the 1904 election. For the first time, no independents were elected.

== Key dates ==
- Issue of writs: Wednesday 26 August
- Close of nominations: Thursday 3 September
- Main polling day: Friday 11 September
  - Return of writs: Saturday 19 September
- Polling day for Roebourne: Wednesday 30 September
  - Return of writs: Saturday 10 October
- Polling day for Gascoyne: Thursday 1 October
  - Return of writs: Thursday 15 October
- Polling day for Dundas and Pilbara: Friday 16 October
  - Return of writs: Friday 23 October
- Polling day for Kimberley: Friday 23 October
  - Return of writs: Saturday 31 October

== Electoral system ==
Members were elected through instant-runoff voting, which at the time was called alternative voting.

== Results ==
Western Australian state election, 1908 Legislative Assembly
Enrolled voters	135,979^{[1]}				
Votes cast	75,855		Turnout	66.49%	+14.63
Informal votes	926		Informal	1.22%	+0.21
Summary of votes by party
Party	Primary votes	%	Swing	Seats	Change
Ministerialist	46,169	61.62%	+7.78	28	–5
Labour	28,325	37.80%	+2.73	22	+8
Independent Labour	435	0.58%	–3.55	0	–1
Total	74,929			50	

== See also ==
- Members of the Western Australian Legislative Assembly, 1905–1908
- Members of the Western Australian Legislative Assembly, 1908–1911

== Notes ==
^{1} The total number of enrolled voters was 135,979, of whom 21,898 were registered in nine uncontested seats. Four of the uncontested seats were won by Ministerialists and five by Labour.
