= Electoral results for the district of Wellington (Western Australia) =

Western Australian district election results

This is a list of electoral results for the Electoral district of Wellington in Western Australian state elections.

== Members for Wellington ==
Wellington (1890–1911)
Member	Party	Term
Harry Venn	Ministerial	1890–1901
Henry Teesdale Smith	Ministerial	1901–1904
Thomas Hayward	Ministerial	1904–1911
Wellington (1962–1983)
Member	Party	Term
Iven Manning	Liberal Country League	1962–1968
Iven Manning	Liberal	1968–1974
June Craig	Liberal	1974–1983
Wellington (1989–1996)
Member	Party	Term
John Bradshaw	Liberal	1989–1996

== Election results ==
=== Elections in the 1990s ===
1993 Western Australian state election: Wellington
Party	Candidate	Votes	%	±%
Liberal	John Bradshaw	6,503	62.4	−0.7
Labor	Marilyn Elson	2,892	27.8	−2.7
Greens	Judyth Salom	651	6.3	+6.3
Democrats	Bernard Noonan	371	3.6	+3.6
Total formal votes		10,417	96.1	+2.8
Informal votes		421	3.9	−2.8
Turnout		10,838	94.9	+1.9
Two-party-preferred result
Liberal	John Bradshaw	6,997	67.2	−0.3
Labor	Marilyn Elson	3,420	32.8	+0.3
Liberal hold		Swing	−0.3	

=== Elections in the 1980s ===
1989 Western Australian state election: Wellington
Party	Candidate	Votes	%	±%
Liberal	John Bradshaw	5,625	63.1	+0.2
Labor	Ronald Mitchell	2,714	30.5	−6.6
Grey Power	Wesley Betterton	570	6.4	+6.4
Total formal votes		8,909	93.3	
Informal votes		642	6.7	
Turnout		9,551	93.0	
Two-party-preferred result
Liberal	John Bradshaw	6,013	67.5	+4.6
Labor	Ronald Mitchell	2,896	32.5	−4.6
Liberal hold		Swing	+4.6	

1980 Western Australian state election: Wellington
Party	Candidate	Votes	%	±%
Liberal	June Craig	4,780	59.2	−2.1
Labor	Patricia Rutherford	3,298	40.8	+2.1
Total formal votes		8,078	96.7	−0.4
Informal votes		274	3.3	+0.4
Turnout		8,352	91.4	−1.3
Liberal hold		Swing	−2.1	

=== Elections in the 1970s ===
1977 Western Australian state election: Wellington
Party	Candidate	Votes	%	±%
Liberal	June Craig	4,630	61.3	
Labor	Robert Greeve	2,928	38.7	
Total formal votes		7,558	97.1	
Informal votes		224	2.9	
Turnout		7,782	92.7	
Liberal hold		Swing	+6.7	

1974 Western Australian state election: Wellington
Party	Candidate	Votes	%	±%
Labor	Andrew Thomson	3,036	41.1	
Liberal	June Craig	2,978	40.4	
National Alliance	John Chidlow	1,365	18.5	
Total formal votes		7,379	95.1	
Informal votes		378	4.9	
Turnout		7,757	92.1	
Two-party-preferred result
Liberal	June Craig	4,139	56.1	
Labor	Andrew Thomson	3,240	43.9	
Liberal hold		Swing		

1971 Western Australian state election: Wellington
Party	Candidate	Votes	%	±%
Liberal	Iven Manning	2,564	43.0	−57.0
Labor	Leslie Pitcher	2,424	40.6	+40.6
Country	Michael Glendon	622	10.4	+10.4
Democratic Labor	Francis Cowcher	236	4.0	+4.0
Independent	Francois Baljeu	118	2.0	+2.0
Total formal votes		5,964	94.5	
Informal votes		347	5.5	
Turnout		6,311	92.3	
Two-party-preferred result
Liberal	Iven Manning	3,397	57.0	−43.0
Labor	Leslie Pitcher	2,567	43.0	+43.0
Liberal hold		Swing	N/A	

=== Elections in the 1960s ===
1968 Western Australian state election: Wellington
Party	Candidate	Votes	%	±%
Liberal and Country	Iven Manning	unopposed		
Liberal and Country hold		Swing		

1965 Western Australian state election: Wellington
Party	Candidate	Votes	%	±%
Liberal and Country	Iven Manning	3,521	63.6	−36.4
Labor	Ivor Hill	2,013	36.4	+36.4
Total formal votes		5,534	96.0	
Informal votes		229	4.0	
Turnout		5,763	92.9	
Liberal and Country hold		Swing	N/A	

1962 Western Australian state election: Wellington
Party	Candidate	Votes	%	±%
Liberal and Country	Iven Manning	unopposed		
Liberal and Country hold		Swing		

=== Elections in the 1900s ===
1908 Western Australian state election: Wellington
Party	Candidate	Votes	%	±%
Ministerialist	Thomas Hayward	666	51.5	−25.7
Ministerialist	William Nairn	402	31.1	+31.1
Ministerialist	Hugh McNeil	225	17.4	+17.4
Total formal votes		1,293	98.6	−0.9
Informal votes		18	1.4	+0.9
Turnout		1,311	63.5	+20.9
Ministerialist hold		Swing	N/A	

1905 Western Australian state election: Wellington
Party	Candidate	Votes	%	±%
Ministerialist	Thomas Hayward	458	77.2	+25.7
Labour	Thomas Adams	167	22.8	+1.4
Total formal votes		732	99.5	+0.6
Informal votes		4	0.5	–0.6
Turnout		736	42.6	–5.9
Ministerialist hold		Swing	+25.7	

1904 Western Australian state election: Wellington
Party	Candidate	Votes	%	±%
Ministerialist	Thomas Hayward	458	51.5	+51.5
Independent	Harry Venn	241	27.1	+27.1
Labour	Hugh McNeil	190	21.4	–2.8
Total formal votes		889	98.9	+1.6
Informal votes		10	1.1	–1.6
Turnout		899	48.5	–9.1
Ministerialist gain from Independent		Swing	+51.5	

1901 Western Australian state election: Wellington
Party	Candidate	Votes	%	±%
Independent	Henry Teesdale Smith	300	48.1	+48.1
Labour	Charles Burke	151	24.2	+24.2
Independent	John Wellard	95	15.2	+15.2
Ministerialist	William Reading	78	12.5	+12.5
Total formal votes		624	97.3	n/a
Informal votes		17	2.7	n/a
Turnout		641	57.6	n/a
Independent gain from Ministerialist		Swing	+48.1	

=== Elections in the 1890s ===
1897 Western Australian colonial election: Wellington
Party	Candidate	Votes	%	±%
Ministerialist	Harry Venn	unopposed		
Ministerialist hold		Swing		

1894 Western Australian colonial election: Wellington
Party	Candidate	Votes	%	±%
None	Harry Venn	unopposed		

1890 Western Australian colonial election: Wellington
Party	Candidate	Votes	%	±%
None	Harry Venn	unopposed		
