= WAGR AI class passenger carriage =

Passenger carriages of Western Australia

AI class carriage
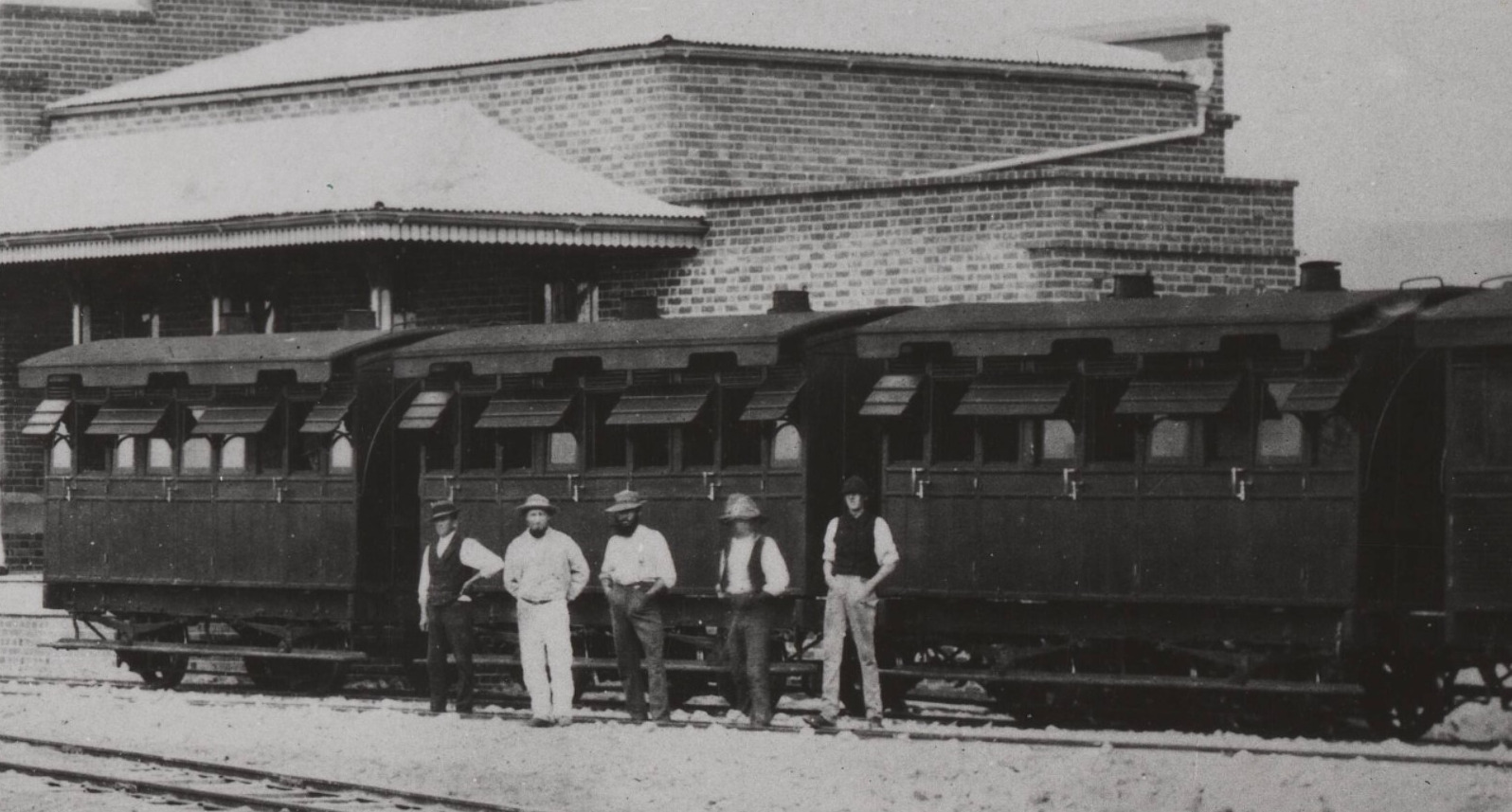
- AI class carriages at Perth station in March 1881
- Manufacturer: Metropolitan Railway Carriage & Wagon Company
- Assembly: Birmingham, England
- Entered service: 1877
- Number built: 14
- Number preserved: 1
- Number scrapped: 13
- Successor: AG class
- Fleet numbers: 1-3, 13, 19-23, 258-262
- Operators: Northern Railway; Bunbury Tramway; Western Australian Government Railways

Specifications
- Track gauge: 3 ft 6 in

The AI Class passenger carriages were a class of four-wheel composite coaches with compartments operated by the Western Australian Government Railways.

== History ==
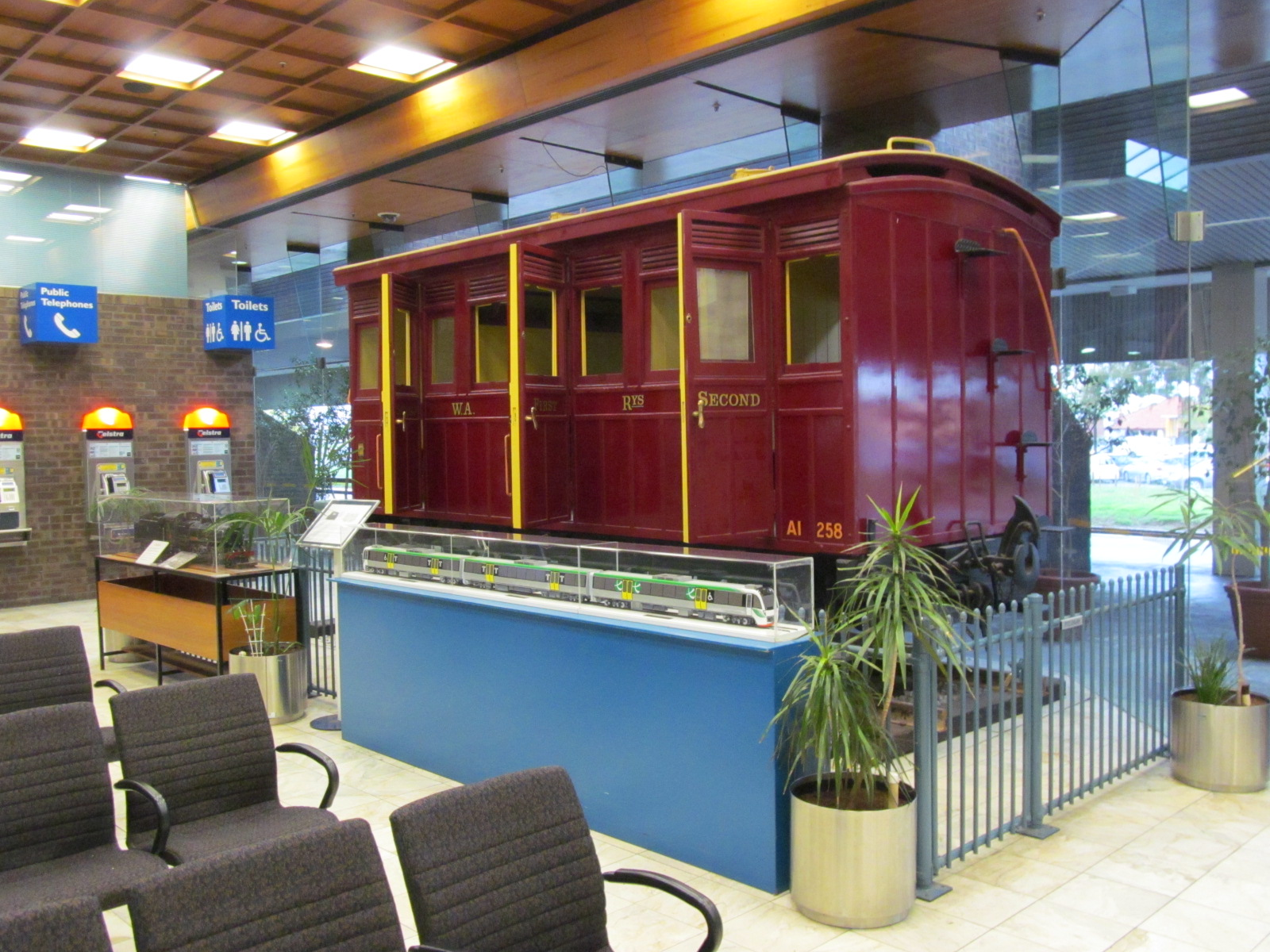
Preserved AI 258 at the Public Transport Centre in May 2014

The first two carriages of this class were ordered from the Metropolitan Railway Carriage & Wagon Company of Birmingham, England. They arrived in Geraldton on board the barque Fitzroy on 7 November 1875 and had finished being assembled in April 1876 and entering service in 1877 on the Northern Railway. The underframes and bodies of the coaches were made of teak on the exterior and red pine in the interior of the carriages.

They had three compartments, the centre compartment for first class passenger and the outer two for second class regular passengers. Each coach had a capacity of twenty-two passengers with sixteen second class and six first class. First class seats were padded while second class seats were just wooden benches made of varnished wood. The coaches were lit by oil lamps of which two were needed to light the entire three compartments.

The coaches were not popular as they were described by Civil Engineer of the Public Works Department James Thomas as "reduced models of old english stock, and totally unsuited for this climate, and not of the class generally employed on successfully worked narrow gauge lines." The two coaches at that time were numbered NR 1 and NR 2.

On 1 March in 1881 three more almost identical four-wheeled coaches entered service on the new Eastern railway line with the criticisms of the first two coaches met with the addition of sunshades over the windows to suit local climate with the coaches being numbered 1, 2 and 3. In 1885 Coach No.1 had a clerestory roof fitted to become WA's first State Saloon. On 13 June in 1885 the Delcomyn arrived with a new four-wheeler which became No.13 to replace No.1. In July 1885 all these four-wheelers were classed 'AB' with No.1 classified 'A' due to its role.

In March 1886 five more of the class entered traffic on the Eastern line the reason that they had been purchased was because of their apparent light weight which made it easy to shunt another coach to a train to accommodate more passengers if needed. On 29 April 1891 two more of the class were delivered on board the Flinders becoming NR No.3 and No.4 entering traffic on 14 May 1891. The last of the class was NR No.5 which formerly worked on the Bunbury Tramway. As the coaches were in traffic during 1890's the passengers did not favour them as newer, larger and more comfortable coaches began appearing on the WAGR such as the AB/ABA carriages (AG after 1900). The capacity of the coaches was reduced to eighteen with six in both second class compartments and still six in the first class compartments.

In 1899 AB No.21 and No.23 were converted to louvred meat vans but this design proved to be expensive to maintain and a 'non-standard design'. Also in 1899 the Northern Railway coaches were put into the AB classification and Numbered from 258 to 262. In September 1900 the WAGR reclassified its rolling stock and the AB small coaches became AI class four-wheelers. In 1901 AI No.3 was converted to a P class travelling workmen's van with AI No.259 also being converted the next year. In 1902 AI No.262 was sold to the Canning Jarrah Timber Company to be used on the Kalamunda Zig Zag line and it is not known what happened to it afterwards. Four coaches of the class were then sold of in 1904 and 1905.

The first ER coach AI No.1 was broken up around 1960 at Jarrahdale in ownership of Millars. And at the start of 1905 just four of the AI class remained. AI No.260 and No.258 both left and went to Mundaring with AI No.13 being sold and its current disposition is unknown. In March 1912 AI No.258 was sold to the Public Works Department and converted to a 'Tramcar' for use on the Carnarvon Jetty and Tramway Railway. In 1914 AI No.2 and No.260 were sent for work at the WAGR's Banksiadale Saw Mill both met their fates there. AI No.22 was converted to a 'tramcar' for Carnarvon after being sold in 1925.

== Preservation ==
AI No.258 was still intact at Carnarvon until it was separated from its frames and placed in a nursery with Steam Locomotive Kimberly for company. The frame of AI No.258 and other flat wagons and frames were put in a recreation ground where they were used as seats! AI No.22 was later destroyed and the relics at Carnarvon were forgotten about until 1988, when they were rediscovered and the body of AI No.258 was put into the care of the Gascoyne Historical Society

in May 1988, it sustained some vandalism while it was placed on a H Class wagon and on 20 October 1989 both the frame and body were sent to Midland Railway Workshops for restoration. The coach was restored to running condition by Westrail in June 1990. AI No.258 is on display on the Public Transport Centre.

== Class list ==
Road number	In service	Withdrawn	Notes
1	1 March 1881	1903	Broken-Up at Jarrahdale in the 1960s
2	1 March 1881	24 June 1914	Burnt at Banksiadale in 1914
3	1 March 1881	1901	Converted to P class workmen's van
13	July 1885	1907	Disposition unknown
19	March 1885	1903/1904	Condemned 1904
20	March 1885	1903/1904	Condemned 1904
21	March 1885	1899	Converted to louvred meat van
22	March 1885	1925	Sold to the Public Work Department, destroyed in the 1960s
23	March 1885	1899	Converted to louvred meat van
258	1877	March 1912	Originally NR No.1, sold to Public Works Department, preserved at Public Transport Centre
259	1877	1902	Converted to P class workmen's van
260	14 May 1891	1914/Unknown	Scrapped at Banksiadale
261	14 May 1891	1898/1899	Condemned in 1899
262	1891	1902	Formerly Bunbury Tramway carriage, disposition unknown

== Incidents ==
On 15 August 1898 a four-wheeled coach caught fire at Mingenew and despite the locomotive crews Trying to put the blaze out it burnt the entire body of the coach which isn't identified in the report but likely to be AI Class No.261. On 24 June 1914 No.2 caught fire at Banksiadale and was likely broken up as a result.
