= Henry Teesdale Smith =

Australian politician

Member of the Legislative Assembly of Western Australia
- In office 24 April 1901 – 24 June 1904
- Preceded by: Harry Venn
- Succeeded by: Thomas Hayward
- Constituency: Wellington

Personal details
- Born: 22 December 1858 Merino, Colony of Victoria
- Died: 25 February 1921 (aged 62) Melbourne, Victoria, Australia

Henry Teesdale Smith (22 December 1858 – 25 February 1921) was an Australian businessman and politician who was prominent at various times as a timber merchant, railway builder, and pastoralist. He served in the Legislative Assembly of Western Australia from 1901 to 1904.

Smith was born in Merino, Victoria, to Ellen (née Teesdale) and George Smith. He attended Hamilton College, and after leaving school began working for a local railway contracting firm. Smith set up his own railway contracting business in 1888, and in 1893 moved to Western Australia to build the Bunbury–Busselton line. The following year, he became manager of an Albany timber firm, which he eventually expanded into a "sawmilling empire with leases and concessions along the length of the Darling Range". In 1902, his firm and seven others merged to form Millars, which had a virtual monopoly over the market in Western Australia.

At the 1901 state election, Smith was elected to the Legislative Assembly seat of Wellington, standing as an independent. However, he did not recontest his seat at the 1904 election, instead choosing to concentrate on his business interests. As manager of Millars, Smith faced several challenges, including a royal commission into price-fixing, a declining market, and several industrial disputes. He resigned in 1908, reputedly over a pay dispute, and left for Adelaide, where he returned to railway contracting. Outside of the timber industry, he had acquired a number of pastoral leases in Western Australia, including properties near Northam, Mount Barker, Harvey, and Wokalup. In South Australia, Smith was responsible for constructing the Gawler–Angaston, Nurioopta–Truro, Balhannah–Mount Pleasant, and Palmer–Sedan railway lines, as well as an electric tramway in Adelaide. In 1911, Smith also returned to Western Australia to build the Marble Bar Railway.

In 1914, the federal government granted Smith the right to build a small section of the Trans-Australian Railway, running west from Port Augusta. In 1918, the state government of New South Wales contracted Smith to build a wheat silo and grain elevator at White Bay. The contract was later claimed to have been signed without appropriate safeguards, and the resulting controversy was said to have contributed to the defeat of William Holman's government at the 1920 state election. Smith lived in Adelaide in retirement, although he also had houses in Melbourne and Sydney. He died in Melbourne in February 1921 (aged 62), of a cerebral haemorrhage. He had married Lydia Kate Johnson in 1885, with whom he had five sons and a daughter.

Parliament of Western Australia
| Preceded by Harry Venn | Member for Wellington; 1901–1904 | Succeeded by Thomas Hayward |
