= Timber railway lines of Western Australia =

Railway lines used by the timber industry in Western Australia

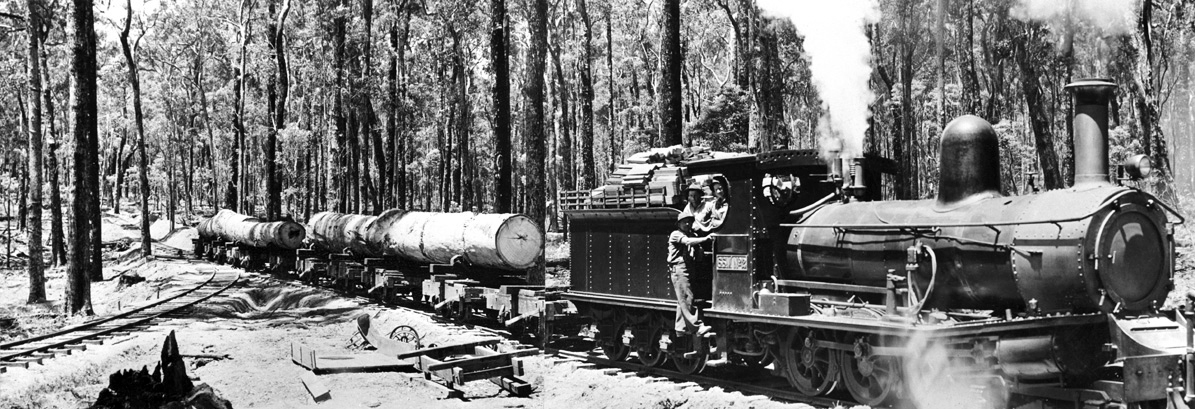
Timber train in Manjimup Pemberton area in the 1940s

The network of railway lines in Western Australia associated with the timber and firewood industries is as old as the mainline railway system of the former Western Australian Government Railways system.

== Timber railways ==
There is a range of terminology related to the timber railways - they have been known as logging railways, timber trams, and other names. The dominant feature is the mobility or ease of moving the lines from one area of forest to another - and in the early years the relatively primitive state of the lines. The dominant features are the narrow gauge and lightness of the locomotives, relative to permanent railways. In Western Australia, to allow for interchangeability of rail stock with the government rail system, a lot of the lines were 3 ft 6 in (1,067 mm) gauge, however the weight of the rails was usually much less than mainline steel.

== Timber industry ==
The timber industry relied mostly upon the jarrah forests of the Darling Range and the karri forests of the Southwest Australia region.

It had stages of development, depending upon government policy and support. The 1980s and the development of government railways assisted the industry, as did various levels of demand for jarrah and the other timbers. Various labour issues in the industry, and external forces, required re-thinking of the industry long before concern for over-logging and forest destruction in the 21st century.

In many cases, timber/sawmilling/logging companies were family businesses, and as a consequence operations continued over time through family relationships, which in turn had effect on timber railway operations.

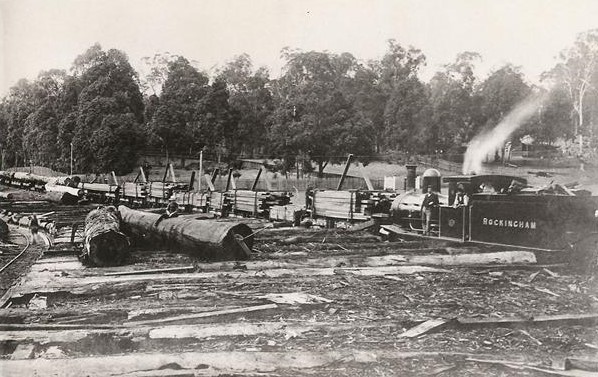
Locomotive named Rockingham shunts wagons at Jarradale yard when under ownership of the Jarrahdale Jarrah Forests and Railways Limited

== Timber companies ==
=== Millars empire ===
- Jarrahdale Jarrah Forests and Railways (mill at Jarrahdale)
- MC Davies Karri & Jarrah Company (mills at Karridale, Boranup and Jarrahdene)
- Millars (mills at Denmark, Yarloop and Mornington Mills)
- Canning Jarrah Timber Company (Note: Not mentioned in Thomas 1929)
- Gill McDowell Jarrah Company (mills at Waroona and Lion Mill)
- Jarrah Wood and Saw Mills Company (Note: Not mentioned in Thomas 1929)
- Jarrah Timber and Wood Paving Corporation (mills at Worsley)
- Imperial Jarrah Wood Corporation (mills at Newlands and Quindalup)
- Swan Saw Mills (Note: Not mentioned in Thomas 1929)
- Wilgarup Karri and Jarrah Company (Note: Not mentioned in Thomas 1929)
- Sussex Timber company (Note: Not mentioned in Thomas 1929)
- Bunning Brothers
- State Saw Mills, Pemberton
- Railway Department Mill, Banksiadale
- Adelaide Timber Company
- Kauri Timber Company
- WA Timber Company
- Perth Firewood Supply Company
- Whites Mill/Honey and Company
- Whittaker Brothers
- Buckingham Brothers
- Sexton and Drysdale/Vincent Brothers

== Firewood industry (Goldfields woodlines) ==
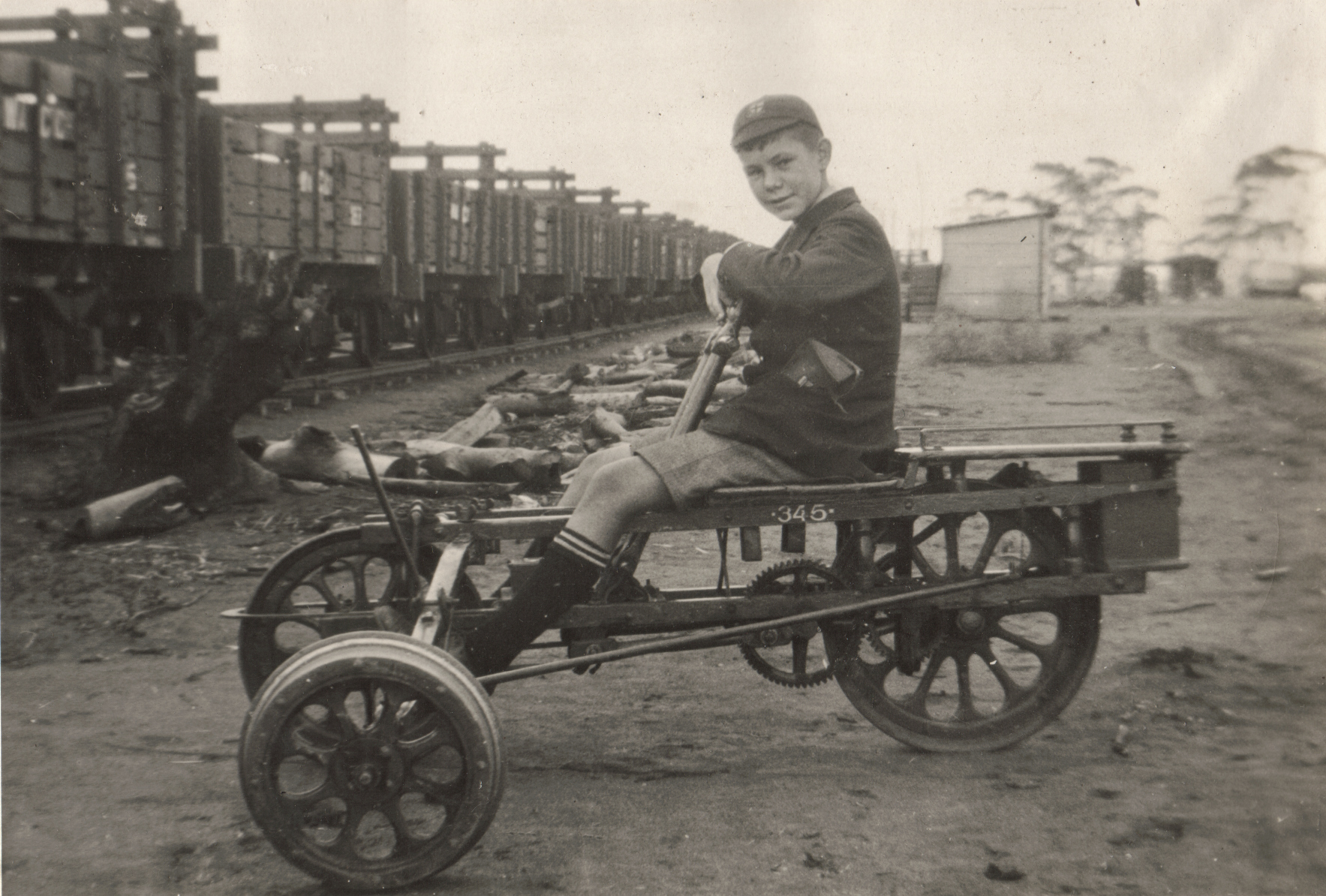
A child on an "Armstrong" distance-measuring trolley on the Kurrawang Wood Line, Western Australia. The caption for this 1928 photo read "These woodlines used to supply timber to the mines and Kalgoorlie Power House. The lines were moved about to follow the salmon gum forests. The rails were leased from the W.A. Govt. Railways by the Timber Co. and once a year this trolley had to be run all over the line and spurs to measure the distance."

Kalgoorlie woodlines were lines that spread throughout the Eastern Goldfields of Western Australia, in all directions from the centre of the Kalgoorlie-Boulder region. Commonly known as the woodlines they sustained a population of railway and timber workers in mainly temporary railway networks that moved regularly from the early twentieth century to the 1960s.

=== Companies ===
The main companies were:

- The West Australian Goldfields Firewood Supply Ltd (WAGFS) formed in 1899 at Kurrawang and moved to Lakewood in 1937.
- The Lakewood Firewood Co. Pty. Ltd (LFC) which took over the WAGFS on 12 August 1948. The LFC was owned by a conglomeration of various firewood customers in the Kalgoorlie region. Operations ceased and the last train of firewood was delivered on 22 December 1964.
- The Kalgoorlie and Boulder Firewood Company formed in 1902 Broad Arrow later to Lakeside and part of the 1919 combine.
- The Westralia Timber and Firewood Company worked between 1902 -1920 at Kanowna later to Kurramia (aka B.T.Henderson's Tramway).
- The Lakeside Firewood Companies was the combination of the latter two businesses and existed for a short time between 1919 and 1924.

=== Woodline strike ===
A significant event in the woodlines history that affected the region was the industrial action that became the Woodline strike between 1 July through to 14 August 1919 over the attempt at post war reduction of wages for workers. The strike brought the goldmines of Kalgoorlie to a standstill as a result.

== Publications ==
The comprehensive coverage of the timber and firewood tramways in Western Australia is the publication in two editions:

- (1997 edition) Gunzburg, Adrian; Austin, Jeff; Light Railway Research Society of Australia; Gunzburg, Adrian; Austin, Jeff (1997), Rails through the bush : timber and firewood tramways and railway contractors of Western Australia, Light Railway Research Society of Australia, ISBN 978-0-909340-32-2
- (2008 edition) Gunzburg, Adrian; Austin, Jeff; Rail Heritage WA; Gunzburg, Adrian; Austin, Jeff (2008), Rails through the bush : timber and firewood tramways and railway contractors of Western Australia (2nd ed.), Rail Heritage WA, ISBN 978-0-9803922-2-7

== See also ==
- Land clearing in Australia
- Forest railway
- Jarrah Forest
- Karri forest
