= WAGR AI class =

Former railcar in Western Australia

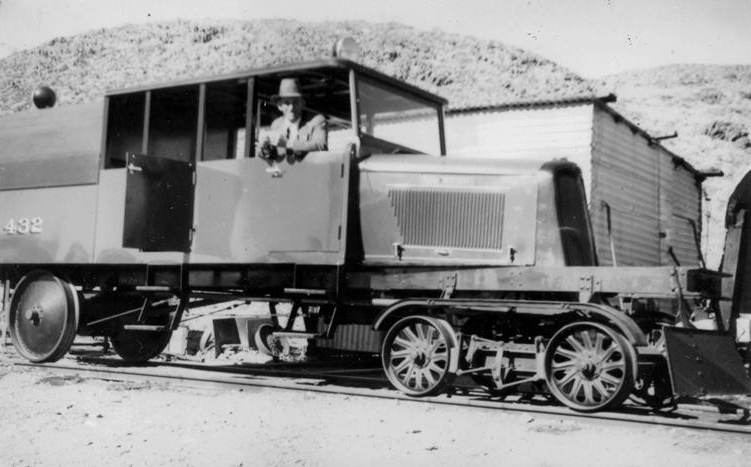
- AI 432 on the Marble Bar Railway
- Entered service: 1935
- Number built: 1
- Fleet numbers: 432
- Operator: WAGR
- Line served: Port Hedland–Marble Bar

Specifications
- Track gauge: 1,067 mm (3 ft 6 in)

The WAGR AI class was a petrol-driven railmotor or railcar operated between 1935 and 1949 by the Western Australian Government Railways (WAGR).

Officially designated as a petrol coach, it was built at the Midland Railway Workshops in 1935.

== Chassis and powertrain ==
The railcar was based on a Dodge K 32 truck chassis purchased from Winterbottom Motor Co in Perth, Western Australia. It had a four-wheeled bogie at the front end, and a drive axle at the rear. Powered by a 25 hp 6-cylinder in-line petrol engine, it was equipped with a four speed bidirectional gearbox, and could reach speeds of up to 50 mph (80 km/h) in each direction. Its fuel capacity was 15 imp gal (68 L; 18 US gal).

== Payload ==
The railcar's maximum payload was eight passengers and 1.5 long tons (1.5 t) of freight.

== Service history ==
The WAGR built the railcar specifically to provide a service on the very lightly trafficked Port Hedland–Marble Bar railway in the Pilbara. Upon completion, it was shipped to Port Hedland aboard the MV Koolinda. It was issued to traffic in October 1935, as WAGR fleet number 432.

In 1937, the WAGR placed its railcars into classes, and no. 432 was classified as the AI class. It remained in service through World War II, but was sold to the State Saw Mills in 1949. Its ultimate fate is not known
