= Marble Bar railway line =

Former railway line in Western Australia

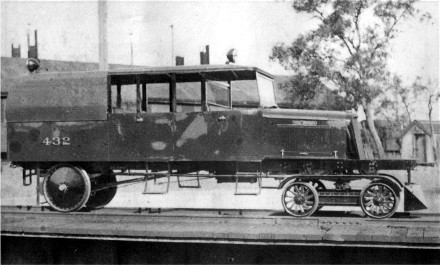
- WAGR AI class petrol rail motor used on Marble Bar Railway from 1934 to 1947

Overview
- Status: Closed
- Owner: WAGR
- Locale: Pilbara, Western Australia
- Termini: Port Hedland; Marble Bar
- Stations: 12

Service
- Type: Heavy rail
- System: Western Australian Government Railways
- Operator(s): WAGR

History
- Opened: July 1911
- Closed: 31 October 1951

Technical
- Line length: 184 km (114 mi)
- Track gauge: 3 ft 6 in (1,067 mm)
- Marble Bar Railway Main locations

The Marble Bar railway line was a railway in the Pilbara region of Western Australia, running into the hinterland from the north-west coast.

== History ==
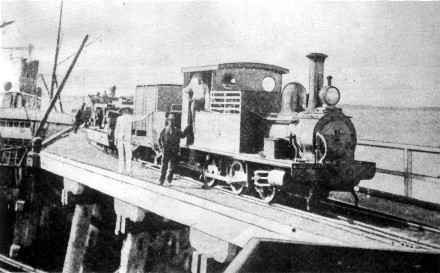
H22 on the jetty at Port Hedland, 1920

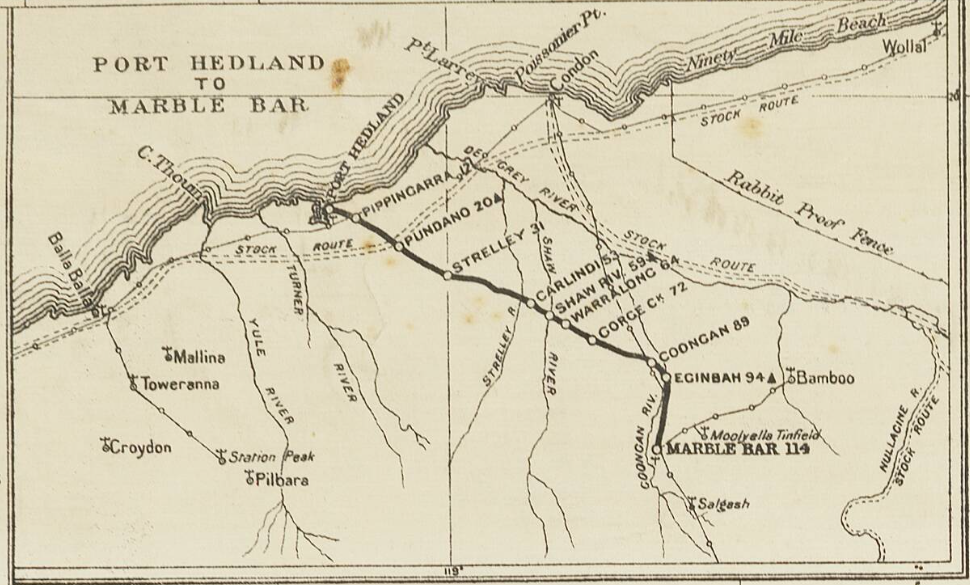
The railway line from Port Hedland to Marble Bar in 1928 (distances in miles)

The Port Hedland–Marble Bar Railway Act 1907, an act by the Parliament of Western Australia granted assent on 19 September 1907, authorised the construction of the railway line from Port Hedland to Marble Bar.

The line was a Western Australian Government Railways (WAGR) 3 ft 6 in (1,067 mm) gauge branch line which was isolated from the rest of the WAGR system. Construction was commenced in 1909, undertaken by the firm of Henry Teesdale Smith, and the line was opened in July 1911.

The line had been proposed for some years before the date of opening.

The closest railhead of the main WAGR rail system was over 1,000 kilometres (620 mi) to the south at Meekatharra, so most rolling stock and materials were shipped in and out Port Hedland.

Due to heavy losses on the line, the Western Australian government asked the 1922 Royal Commission of Inquiry into the Railway Department to make a specific inquiry into the running of the Port Hedland railway. The commissioner found that "the railway cannot be run effectively so long as it is administered by the Railways Department" and recommended, among other things, that the running of the line be handed over to the Commissioner of the North-West. That was not done.

The reputation of the line for its slow running speed lived on long after the railway had closed, with Patsy Adam Smith's 1969 book about early railways noting the use of the ironic name the Spinifex Flyer.

The Railway (Port Hedland-Marble Bar) Discontinuance Act 1950 was granted royal assent on 18 December 1950, and the last train to run out of Port Hedland operated on 25 October 1951. The railway closed on 31 October 1951.

Iron ore railways that have subsequently been constructed in the Pilbara region are standard gauge railways.

== See also ==
- Don Rhodes Mining and Transport Museum
- Goldsworthy railway
- Mount Newman railway
- Rail transport in Western Australia

== Bibliography ==
- Affleck, Fred (1978). On Track: The Making of Westrail, 1950–1976. Perth: Westrail. ISBN 0724475605. OCLC 6489347.
- Joyce, John; Tilley, Allan (1980). Railways in the Pilbara (2nd ed.). Wembley, WA: J & A Publications. pp. 21–32. ISBN 0959969926. OCLC 222691305.
- May, Andrew S; Gray, Bill (2006). A History of WAGR Passenger Carriages. Midland, WA: Bill Gray. ISBN 0646459023.
- Quinlan, Howard & Newland, John R.(2000) Australian Railway Routes 1854-2000 ISBN 0-909650-49-7
