= Mornington, Western Australia =

Coordinates: 33°09′S 115°56′E

Mornington
- Town
- Coordinates
- Country: Australia
- State: Western Australia
- LGA(s): Shire of Harvey
- Location: 154 km (96 mi) from Perth; 47 km (29 mi) from Bunbury; 14 km (8.7 mi) from Capel

Government
  - State electorate(s): Murry-Wellington
  - Federal division(s): Forrest

Area
  - Total: 238.5 km^{2} (92.1 sq mi)

Population
  - Total(s): 42 (SAL 2021)
- Time zone: UTC+8 (AWST)
- Postcode: 6221

Mornington, also known as Mornington Mills, is the site of former timber saw mills and a community on the Darling Range in Western Australia. It was part of the operations of Millars. At the 2021 census, the area had a population of 42.

The Millars timber railway system covered an extensive area east of Mornington. It is east of the South Western Highway and South Western Railway, south of Wokalup and north of Benger.

It was fully operational as a company town by 1899 and, at its peak, it contained a school, two churches, a hall, and a company store. On 6 November 1920, the Jubilee locomotive carrying workers and timber from Mornington Mills to Wokelup derailed, killing nine people and injuring two. The town closed on 11 August 1961, when its workers moved to Yarloop. The site of the mill was subsequently a Police Citizens Youth Club camp, Camp Mornington, which closed in 2020 due to financial pressures relating to the COVID-19 pandemic. The remains of the community, railway line and the former saw mills have been regularly researched and written about.

== See also ==
- Timber railway lines of Western Australia
