= East Perth Locomotive Depot =

Demolished locomotive depot in East Perth, Western Australia

Coordinates: 31°56′41″S 115°52′36″E

East Perth Locomotive Depot was a major steam locomotive depot for the Western Australian Government Railways from a year before the end of the First World War in 1917, until the end of the steam railway era on its railway system in 1970–1971. The previous locomotive depot had been located west of the Perth railway station.

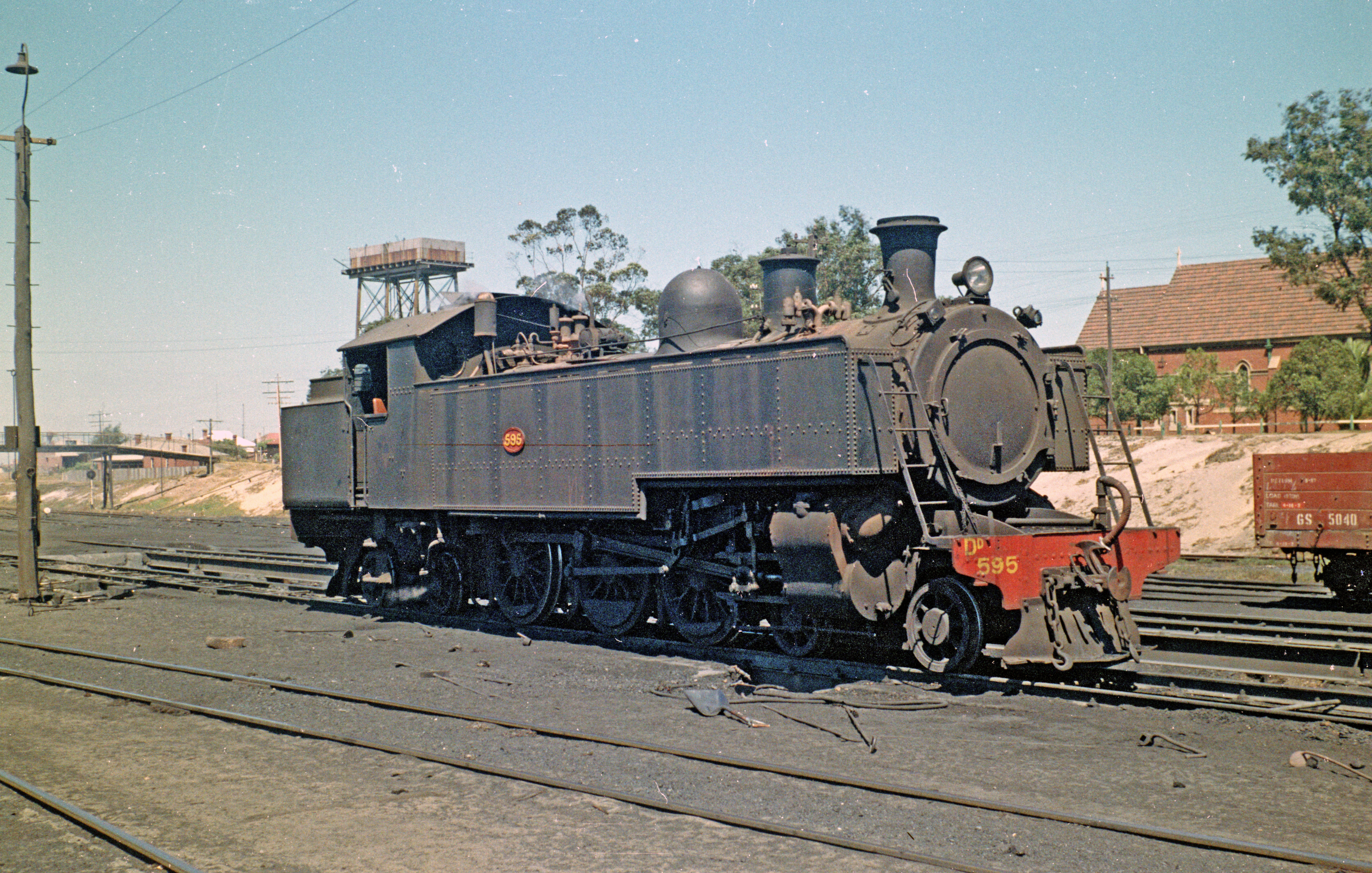
Locomotive at East Perth Locomotive Depot, with still extant Saint Francis Xavier church visible in background

Commonly known as East Perth loco sheds and East Perth Depot, the depot was operational from 1917. There was a turntable at the western end of the yard.

It was located just east of the main railway terminus for the system at what is now Perth station. The depot was removed in 1969 to make way for the new East Perth railway station and the Westrail Centre that centralised railway administration offices of the government railway system, that had previously been scattered around a large number of buildings near the Perth station.

A replica of the depot was made at Whitemans Park and is home to the Revolutions Transport Museum.

Jack Stanbridge devotes 41 photos on 10 pages of his first volume of his collection known as 70 years of rails & wire in Western Australia for reflections about the depot.

In the late twentieth century numbers of former employees who had worked at the depot, were interviewed for the oral history record.

Organised labour had reason to strike and raise issues of conditions during the existence of the depot. Some complaints had also been made collectively without union involvement.
