= Wokalup, Western Australia =

Wokalup
- Town
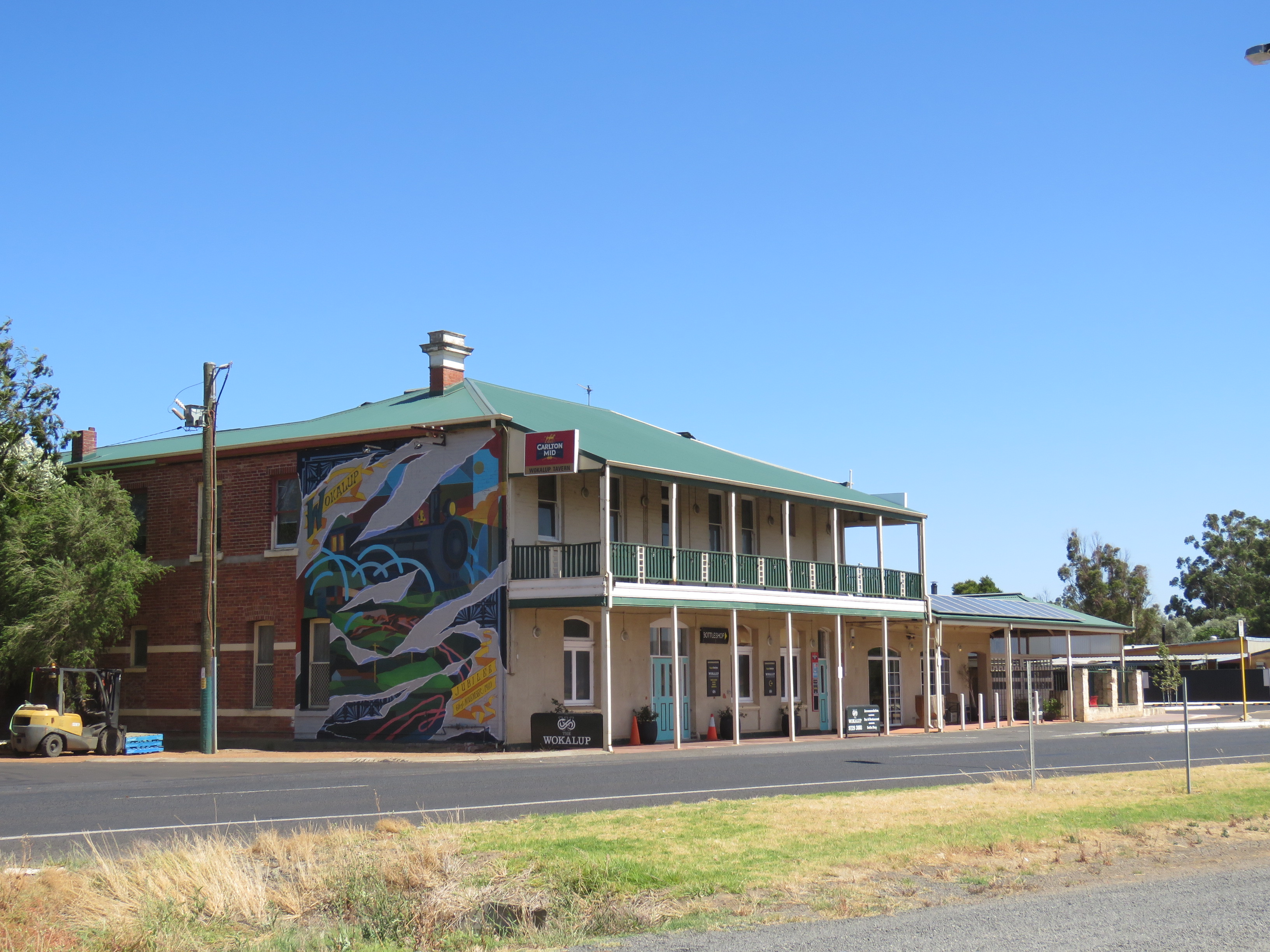
- The Wokalup Tavern in January 2023

- Interactive map of Wokalup
- Coordinates: 33.11°S 115.88°E
- Country: Australia
- State: Western Australia
- LGA: Shire of Harvey
- Location: 146 km (91 mi) from Perth; 6 km (3.7 mi) from Harvey

Government
  - State electorate: Murray-Wellington
  - Federal division: Forrest

Area
  - Total: 80.8 km^{2} (31.2 sq mi)

Population
  - Total: 255 (SAL 2021)
- Postcode: 6221

Wokalup is a town in the South West region of Western Australia along the South Western Highway, between Harvey and Brunswick Junction. At the 2006 census, Wokalup had a population of 449.

It lies just north west of Mornington Mills and was the junction for railway access to the Millars Mornington network of timber railways.

Wokalup's name derives from an Aboriginal name meaning "the place of the carpet snake" (wokul). Such snakes were often found in farm sheds in the area prior to the commencement of irrigation but tiger snakes became more common subsequently.

The location was originally granted in 1830, but the title lapsed as the owner made no improvements to the property. The Western Australian Company obtained it in the 1840s; the first resident was Thomas Hayward, who commenced farming at Bundidup south of Harvey in 1859. At this time, there were no made roads or bridges through the town, but during the 1860s the Harvey and Brunswick bridges were constructed and convicts built the road from Pinjarra to Brunswick. Hayward provided for the needs of both the convicts and the horse teams. When the railway came through in the 1890s a railway siding with the name Wokalup was opened, and a small private town developed. This was gazetted a townsite in 1963 at the request of the Shire of Harvey.

== Present day ==
Wokalup is a small agricultural town with services offered from nearby Harvey. A former deer park is being reconstructed as a cheese making and tourist facility, taking advantage of its location in the Harvey-Brunswick dairy district. A tavern and basic accommodation facilities are nearby.

== Climate ==
Climate data for Wokalup, Western Australia
| Month | Jan | Feb | Mar | Apr | May | Jun | Jul | Aug | Sep | Oct | Nov | Dec | Year |
|---|---|---|---|---|---|---|---|---|---|---|---|---|---|
| Average precipitation mm (inches) | 14.7 (0.58) | 15.5 (0.61) | 20.6 (0.81) | 51.4 (2.02) | 134.6 (5.30) | 181.2 (7.13) | 182.1 (7.17) | 134.0 (5.28) | 96.9 (3.81) | 57.7 (2.27) | 36.2 (1.43) | 15.1 (0.59) | 966.5 (38.05) |
| Average rainy days | 2.6 | 2.6 | 4.0 | 8.0 | 13.4 | 17.3 | 19.4 | 17.0 | 14.6 | 10.2 | 7.5 | 3.8 | 120.4 |
| Mean daily sunshine hours | 10.6 | 9.9 | 8.6 | 6.4 | 5.1 | 4.1 | 4.5 | 5.7 | 6.7 | 7.8 | 8.5 | 9.9 | 7.3 |
Source: www.bom.gov.au/climate/averages/tables/cw_009642_All.shtml
