= Public Transport Centre =

Public transport terminal in Perth, Western Australia

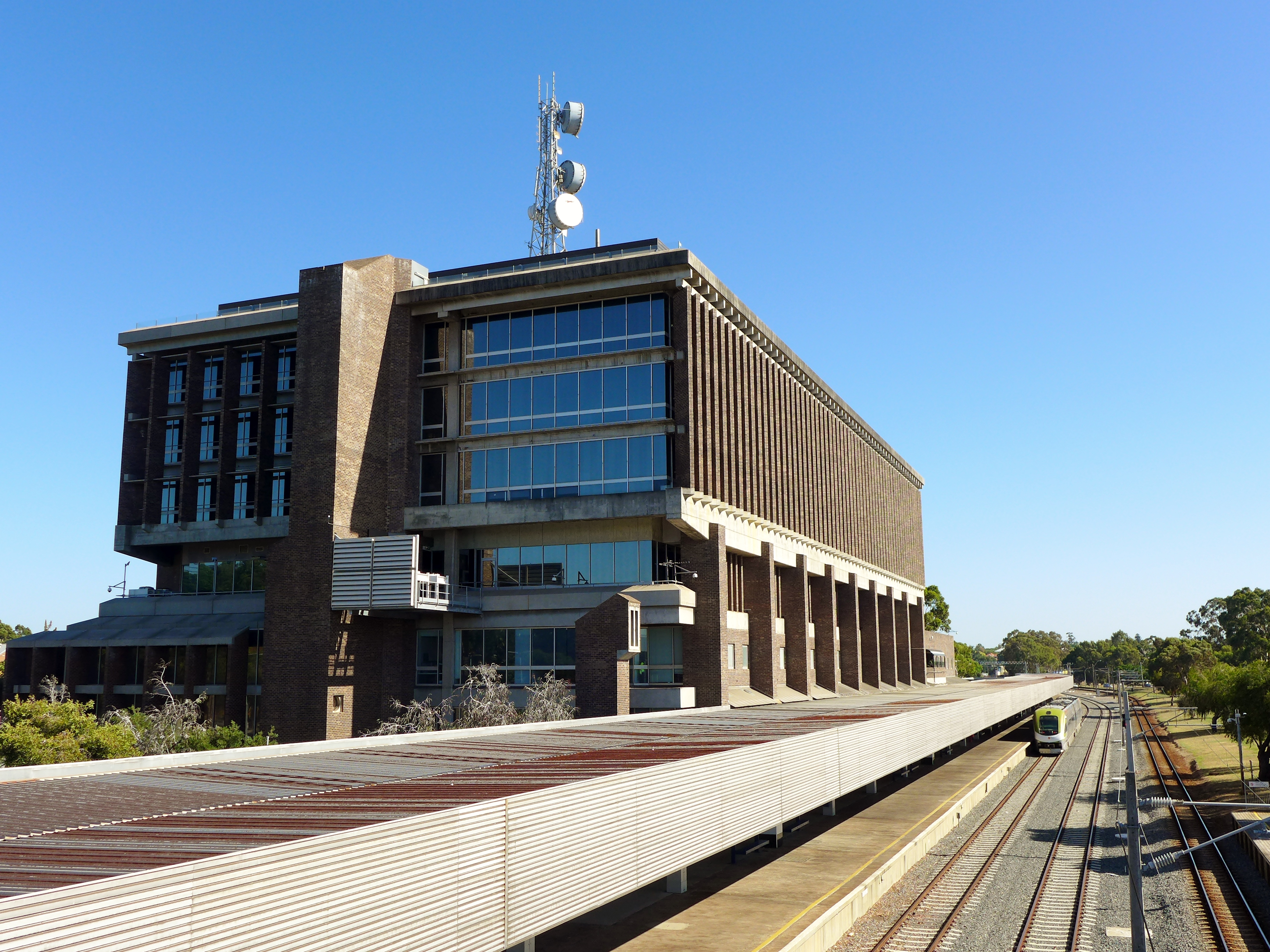
- The Public Transport Centre in 2015

- Location within Perth
- Former names: Westrail Centre

General information
- Type: Public transport terminal; Office building
- Architectural style: Brutalist
- Location: 116 West Parade, Perth, Australia
- Coordinates: 31°56′36″S 115°52′37″E
- Current tenants: Public Transport Authority
- Opened: 12 November 1976

Design and construction
- Architecture firm: Forbes & Fitzhardinge

Website
- www.pta.wa.gov.au

The Public Transport Centre (formerly known as the Westrail Centre) is a terminal and administration building for public transport in Perth, Western Australia. It is the centrepiece of East Perth Terminal (formerly known as Perth Terminal), a standard gauge railway station and coach terminal adjacent to East Perth station on the Transperth narrow gauge suburban rail network.

Since 2025, some transport operations have been based in the Public Transport Operations Control Centre, which was constructed adjacent to the existing Public Transport Centre.

== Overview ==
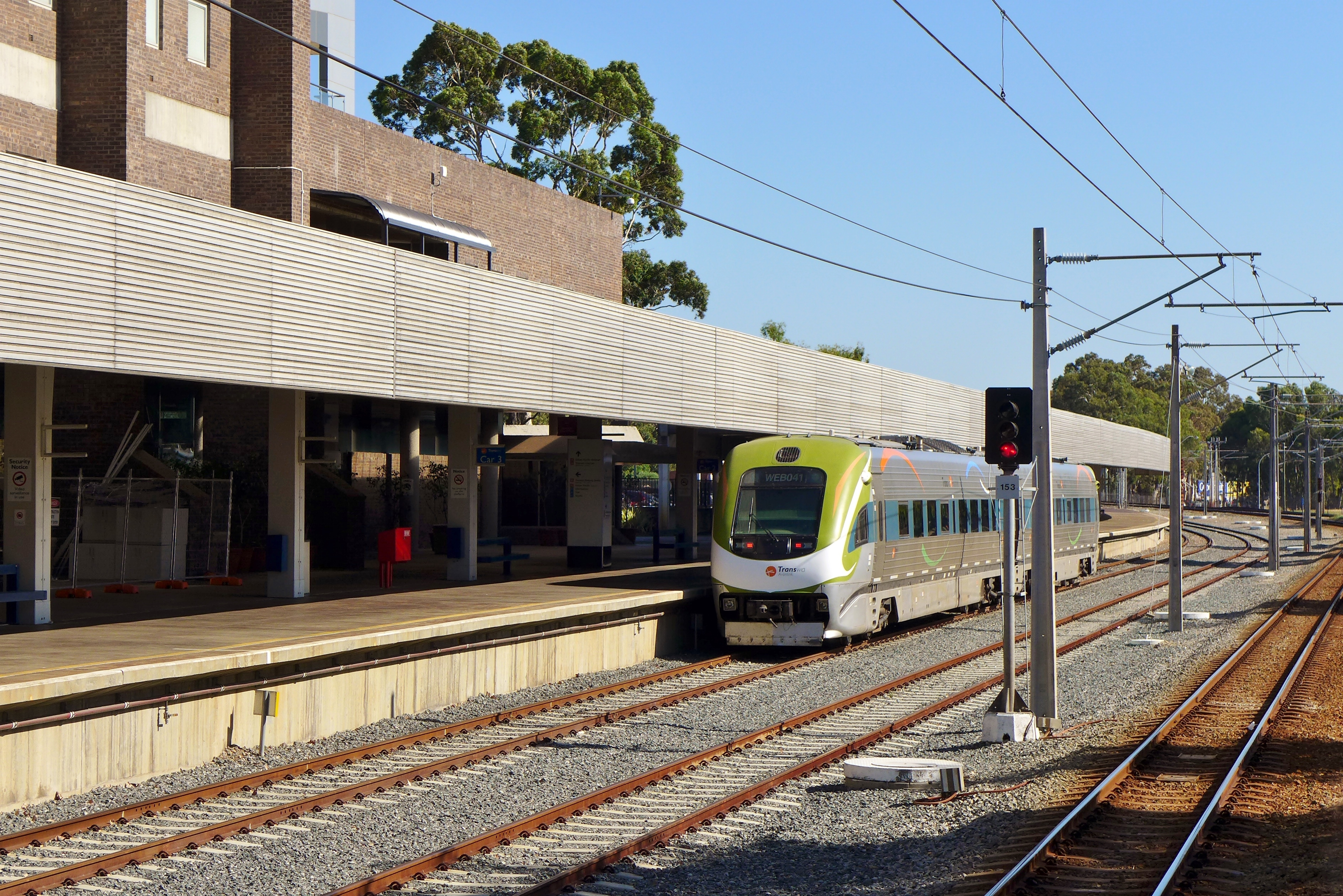
MerredinLink service at East Perth Terminal in January 2015

The site occupied by East Perth station, East Perth Terminal, and the Public Transport Centre was formerly the East Perth Locomotive Depot.

=== East Perth Railway Terminal ===
As part of the gauge conversion of the Eastern Goldfields Railway, a new standard gauge terminus was opened in 1969. The station has one side platform and a dock platform at its northern end.

Today the station is served by Journey Beyond's Indian Pacific, and Transwa's Prospector and MerredinLink services. Until it ceased in June 1991, the terminal was also served by the Trans-Australian.

=== Administration building ===
The construction of building above and adjacent to the Railway Terminal platform was commissioned by the Western Australian Government Railways (WAGR). By the time it was completed, WAGR had become Westrail.

It was opened by State Premier Charles Court on 12 November 1976 as the Westrail Centre. The public area includes a newsagent, café, help desks, vending machines, seats, televisions, information screens, an ATM and public toilets. In 2000, the upper floors were refurbished.

The building was formerly the headquarters for Westrail, and after the sale of Westrail's freight services was occupied by the Australian Railroad Group (ARG) from 2000 until 2002. In 2002, ARG relocated to Welshpool, and the building is now occupied by the Public Transport Authority and Department of Transport having been renamed the Public Transport Centre.

Transwa coach services to various state destinations also currently depart and arrive at the northern end of the terminal building.

=== Public Transport Operations Control Centre ===
In 2021, it was announced that some operations will expand into the Public Transport Operations Control Centre, a new A$25-million building to be constructed 100 metres (330 ft) north from the existing Public Transport Centre building. The building was completed in late-2023, with renovations and staff migration to continue over a three-year period. It was declared ready for operations in April 2025.

The Public Transport Operations Control Centre will also eventually house Metronet's High Capacity Signalling project.

Preceding station	Transwa	Following station
Terminus	Prospector	Midland towards Kalgoorlie
Terminus	MerredinLink	Midland towards Merredin
Preceding station	Journey Beyond	Following station
Terminus	Indian Pacific	Kalgoorlie towards Sydney
