= Thomas Hayward (Australian politician) =

Australian politician

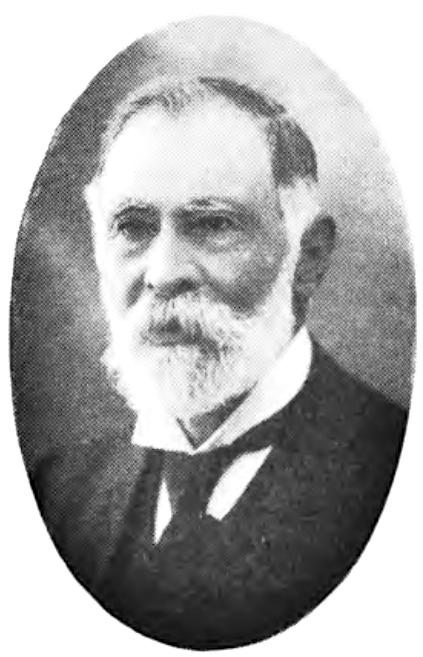

Member of the Legislative Assembly of Western Australia
- In office 24 April 1901 – 28 June 1904
- Preceded by: Sir John Forrest
- Succeeded by: Newton Moore
- Constituency: Bunbury
- In office 28 June 1904 – 3 October 1911
- Preceded by: Henry Smith
- Succeeded by: None (abolished)
- Constituency: Wellington

Personal details
- Born: 1 September 1832 Honington, Suffolk, England
- Died: 23 September 1915 (aged 83) Bunbury, Western Australia, Australia

Thomas Hayward (1 September 1832 – 23 September 1915) was an early settler of Western Australia. Arriving from England in 1853, he became prominent in Bunbury and the surrounding area, serving a term as the town's mayor. He was later a member of the Legislative Assembly of Western Australia from 1901 to 1911.

Hayward was born in Honington, Suffolk, England. He came to Western Australia in September 1853, and went into partnership with his cousin, Robert Henry Rose. Their ventures were largely unsuccessful and they eventually went their separate ways, with Hayward purchasing a property of 4,136 acres (16.74 km^{2}) south of Harvey (in what is now Wokalup). He later also opened a store in Bunbury, where he sold imported agricultural equipment. Hayward served on the Bunbury Municipal Council from 1875 to 1879, and was then Mayor of Bunbury from 1879 to 1880.

Having retired from his business in 1898, Hayward stood for parliament at the 1901 state election, winning the seat of Bunbury. The previous member was the former premier, Sir John Forrest, who had transferred to federal politics, while his chief opponent was Newton Moore, who was a future premier. At the 1904 election, Hayward transferred to the neighbouring seat of Wellington, which contained his farm. He was re-elected at the 1905 and 1908 elections, eventually retiring from parliament at the 1911 election (aged 79). A few years previously, he had set a new record as Western Australia's oldest sitting parliamentarian, surpassing William Spencer.

Hayward died in Bunbury in September 1915, aged 83. He had married Catherine Logue in 1861, with whom he seven children; she preceded him in death by 18 days. Hayward's brother-in-law, Major Logue, was also a member of parliament.

Parliament of Western Australia
Preceded by Sir John Forrest	Member for Bunbury; 1901–1904	Succeeded by Newton Moore
Preceded by Henry Smith	Member for Wellington; 1904–1911	Abolished
