= Electoral district of Wellington (Western Australia) =

Former electoral district of Western Australia

Wellington Western Australia—Legislative Assembly
- State: Western Australia
- Dates current: 1890–1911, 1962–1983, 1989–1996
- Namesake: Wellington Land District

Wellington was an electoral district of the Legislative Assembly in the Australian state of Western Australia.

The district had three incarnations and was based in the south-west of the state.

== Members ==
Wellington (1890–1911)
Member	Party	Term
Harry Venn	Ministerial	1890–1901
Henry Teesdale Smith	Ministerial	1901–1904
Thomas Hayward	Ministerial	1904–1911
Wellington (1962–1983)
Member	Party	Term
Iven Manning	LCL	1962–1968
Iven Manning	Liberal	1968–1974
June Craig	Liberal	1974–1983
Wellington (1989–1996)
Member	Party	Term
John Bradshaw	Liberal	1989–1996
