= Harry Venn =

Australian politician

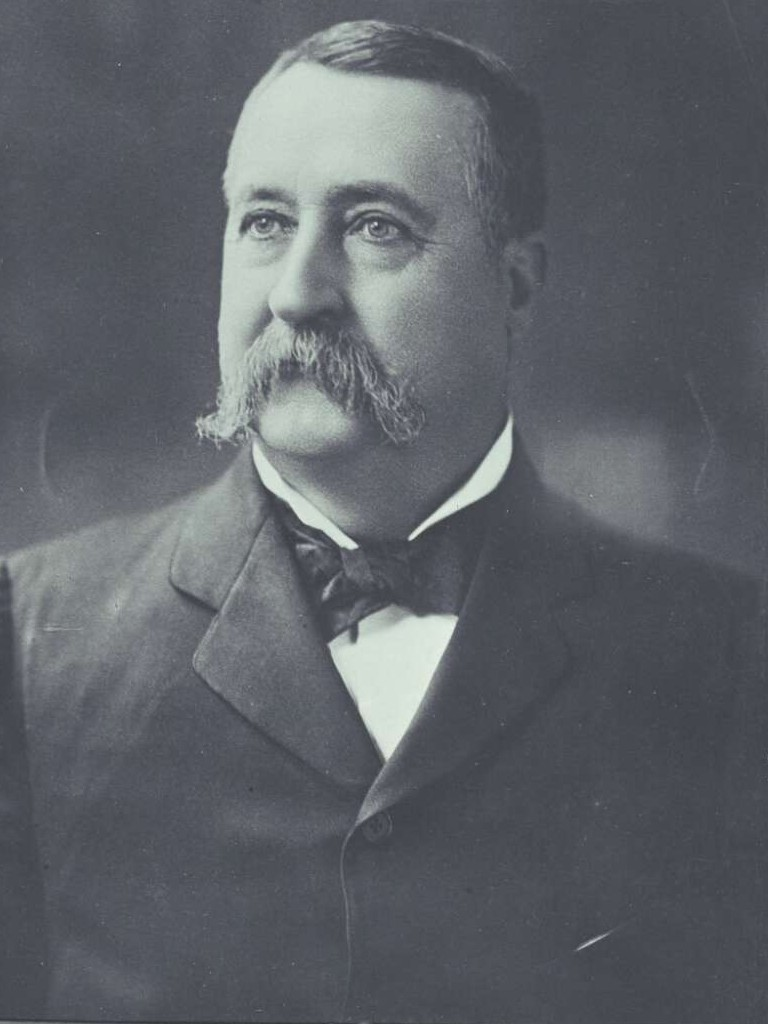
Harry Venn at the 1898 Australasian Federal Convention.

Harry Whittall Venn (27 October 1844 – 8 March 1908) was an Australian politician. He was the member for Wellington in the Western Australian Legislative Assembly from 1890 to 1901. He served as commissioner of railways and minister of works from 1890 to 1896 under premier John Forrest.
