= Canning Jarrah Timber Company =

Former timber company in Western Australia

Canning Jarrah Timber
- Industry: Timber and Railways
- Founded: 1898
- Defunct: 1903
- Fate: Acquired by Western Australian Government Railways
- Headquarters: Australia

The Canning Jarrah Timber Company was a timber and timber railway company operating in the Darling Range in Western Australia in the 1890s.

The company was registered in London in 1898.

It built the Upper Darling Range railway. The railway developed the communities of Canning Mills, Kalamunda, and nearby locations, enabling delivery of materials to Perth; this included timber and other produce.

The company's timber operations were sold to Millars in December 1901. The railway was taken over by the Western Australian Government Railways in July 1903.
