= Millars (company) =

Former timber company in Western Australia

Millars was a Western Australian focused timber and timber railway company.

== History ==
Millars' Karri and Jarrah Forests Limited was a public company incorporated in London in July 1897 with its shares listed on the London Stock Exchange.

In 1971 Millars was taken over by Inchcape. In 1983 it was taken over by Bunnings.

In 1902 an amalgamation of Western Australian timber companies saw Millars' Karri and Jarrah Company (1902) Limited formed from:

- Millars Karri and Jarrah Forests Limited (Mills at Denmark, Yarloop and Mornington)
- Jarrahdale Jarrah Forests and Railways Limited (Mill at Jarrahdale)
- M. C. Davies' Karri and Jarrah Company Limited (mills at Karridale, Boranup and Jarrahdene)
- Canning Jarrah Timber Company
- Gill McDowell Jarrah Company (mills at Waroona and Lion Mill)
- Jarrah Wood and Saw Mills Company
- Jarrah Timber and Wood Paving Corporation (mills at Worsley)
- Imperial Jarrah Wood Corporation (mills at Newlands and Quindalup)
- Sussex Timber company
- Swan Saw Mills
- Wilgarup Karri and Jarrah Company

== Archives ==
- Battye Library has a collection of materials.
