= Electoral results for the district of North Fremantle =

Western Australian district election results

This is a list of electoral results for the Electoral district of North Fremantle in Western Australian state elections.

== Members for North Fremantle ==
Member	Party	Term
William Silas Pearse	Non-aligned	1890–1895
Matthew Moss	Non-aligned	1895–1897
Denis Doherty	Ministerial	1897–1903
John Ferguson	Opposition	1903–1904
Harry Bolton	Labor	1904–1911

== Election results ==
=== Elections in the 1900s ===
1908 Western Australian state election: North Fremantle
Party	Candidate	Votes	%	±%
Labour	Harry Bolton	942	59.7	−2.8
Ministerialist	Patrick Hevron	635	40.3	+2.8
Total formal votes		1,577	99.6	0.0
Informal votes		7	0.4	0.0
Turnout		1,584	88.0	+21.3
Labour hold		Swing	−2.8	

1905 Western Australian state election: North Fremantle
Party	Candidate	Votes	%	±%
Labour	Harry Bolton	894	62.5	+3.6
Ministerialist	Patrick Hevron	537	37.5	–3.6
Total formal votes		1,431	99.6	+0.4
Informal votes		6	0.4	–0.4
Turnout		1,437	66.7	+11.5
Labour hold		Swing	+3.6	

1904 Western Australian state election: North Fremantle
Party	Candidate	Votes	%	±%
Labour	Harry Bolton	1,055	58.9	+18.1
Ministerialist	John Ferguson	735	41.0	–0.4
Total formal votes		1,790	99.2	+0.8
Informal votes		15	0.8	–0.8
Turnout		1,805	55.2	+1.6
Labour gain from Ministerialist		Swing	+18.1	

1903 North Fremantle state by-election
Party	Candidate	Votes	%	±%
Opposition	John Ferguson	412	41.4	+41.4
Labour	James Ives	406	40.8	+40.8
Ministerialist	Walter Raleigh	136	13.7	+13.7
Independent	Thomas Parker	41	4.1	+4.1
Total formal votes		995	98.4	−0.7
Informal votes		16	1.6	+0.7
Turnout		1,011	53.6	−2.2
Opposition gain from Ministerialist		Swing	N/A	

1901 Western Australian state election: North Fremantle
Party	Candidate	Votes	%	±%
Ministerialist	Denis Doherty	433	39.0	–12.4
Ministerialist	Thomas Cartwright	345	31.1	+31.1
Independent	Henry Passmore	332	29.9	+29.9
Total formal votes		1,110	99.1	+6.6
Informal votes		10	0.9	–6.6
Turnout		1,120	55.8	+22.2
Ministerialist hold		Swing	N/A	

=== Elections in the 1890s ===
1897 Western Australian colonial election: North Fremantle
Party	Candidate	Votes	%	±%
Ministerialist	Denis Doherty	160	51.4	
Opposition	James King	84	27.0	
Independent	Robert Dearle	47	15.1	
Independent	Rowland Rees	20	6.4	
Total formal votes		311	92.6	
Informal votes		25	7.4	
Turnout		336	33.6	
Ministerialist hold		Swing		

1895 North Fremantle colonial by-election
Party	Candidate	Votes	%	±%
None	Matthew Moss	297	54.6	+28.1
None	Denis Doherty	147	27.0	+27.0
None	George Baker	100	18.4	−9.5
Total formal votes		544	98.2	+1.4
Informal votes		10	1.8	−1.4
Turnout		554	61.0	−5.8

1894 Western Australian colonial election: North Fremantle
Party	Candidate	Votes	%	±%
None	William Pearse	236	45.6	–9.9
PPL	George Baker	144	27.9	+27.9
None	Matthew Moss	137	26.5	+26.5

1890 Western Australian colonial election: North Fremantle
Party	Candidate	Votes	%	±%
None	William Pearse	151	55.5	n/a
None	Adam Jameson	121	44.5	n/a
