= Electoral results for the district of East Fremantle =

Western Australian district election results

This is a list of electoral results for the Electoral district of East Fremantle in Western Australian state elections.

== Members for East Fremantle ==
Member	Party	Term
Joseph Holmes	Ministerial	1897–1904
William Angwin	Labour	1904–1905
Joseph Holmes	Ministerial	1905–1906
William Angwin	Labour	1906–1911

== Election results ==
=== Elections in the 1900s ===
1908 Western Australian state election: East Fremantle
Party	Candidate	Votes	%	±%
Labour	William Angwin	unopposed		
Labour hold		Swing		

1906 East Fremantle state by-election
Party	Candidate	Votes	%	±%
Labour	William Angwin	1,473	71.4	+21.9
Ministerialist	Thomas Smith	591	28.6	−21.9
Total formal votes		2,064	99.4	−0.3
Informal votes		12	0.6	+0.3
Turnout		2,076	73.9	+8.7
Labour gain from Ministerialist		Swing	+21.9	

1905 Western Australian state election: East Fremantle
Party	Candidate	Votes	%	±%
Ministerialist	Joseph Holmes	1,019	50.5	+3.5
Labour	William Angwin	999	49.5	–3.5
Total formal votes		2,018	99.7	+0.1
Informal votes		5	0.3	–0.1
Turnout		2,023	65.2	+9.5
Ministerialist gain from Labour		Swing	–3.5	

1904 Western Australian state election: East Fremantle
Party	Candidate	Votes	%	±%
Labour	William Angwin	1,245	53.0	+26.0
Ministerialist	Joseph Holmes	1,104	47.0	–26.0
Total formal votes		2,349	99.6	+0.6
Informal votes		10	0.4	–0.6
Turnout		2,359	55.7	+7.4
Labour gain from Ministerialist		Swing	+26.0	

1901 Western Australian state election: East Fremantle
Party	Candidate	Votes	%	±%
Opposition	Joseph Holmes	1,054	73.0	+22.2
Labour	William Angwin	389	27.0	+27.0
Total formal votes		1,443	99.0	+0.6
Informal votes		15	1.0	–0.6
Turnout		1,458	48.3	–19.7
Opposition hold		Swing	+22.2	

=== Elections in the 1890s ===
1897 Western Australian colonial election: East Fremantle
Party	Candidate	Votes	%	±%
Ministerialist	Joseph Holmes	182	50.8	
Opposition	Matthew Moss	176	49.2	
Total formal votes		358	98.3	
Informal votes		6	1.7	
Turnout		364	68.0	
Ministerialist gain from Opposition		Swing		
