= Leake ministry =

Leake ministry may refer to:

- First Leake ministry
- Second Leake ministry

== See also ==
- George Leake, former premier of Western Australia
