= List of mayors of East Fremantle =

The Town of East Fremantle in Perth, Western Australia was originally established on 2 April 1897 as a municipality with a mayor and councillors under the Municipal Institutions' Act 1876. With the passage of the Local Government Act 1960, all municipalities became towns effective 1 July 1961.

== Municipality of East Fremantle ==
Mayor	Term
Matthew Moss	1897–1900
Francis McDonald	1900–1903
William Angwin	1903–1906
Stuart Thomson	1906–1909
Joseph Francis Allen	1909–1914
Leonard Burlington Bolton	1914–1919
Harry Woodhouse	1919–1924
Herbert John Locke	1924–1931
Joseph Francis Allen^{[1]}	1931–1933
John Munro	1933–1934
Herbert John Locke	1934–1944
William Wauhop	1944–1961

== Town of East Fremantle ==
Mayor	Term
William Wauhop	1961–1964
Victor Ulrich	1964–1974
Ian Gilbert Handcock	1974–1991
Andrew Bruce Smith	1991–1994
Timothy Martin Smith	1994–1997
Andrew Bruce Smith	1997–2001
James O'Neill	2001–2007
Alan Ferris	2007–2013
James O'Neill	2013–present

== Notes ==
^{1} Joseph Francis Allen died in office on 23 May 1933. John Munro was elected at an extraordinary election on 14 June 1933.
