= Herbert John Locke =

Australian politician (1864–1944)

Mayor of East Fremantle
- In office 1924–1931
- Preceded by: Harry Woodhouse
- Succeeded by: Joseph Francis Allen

Chairman of the Melville Road Board
- In office 1928–1932
- Preceded by: V. G. C. Riseley
- Succeeded by: P. S. Jane

East Fremantle Councillor
- In office 1932–1933

Mayor of East Fremantle
- In office 1934–1944
- Preceded by: John Munro
- Succeeded by: William Wauhop

Personal details
- Born: 1864 London
- Died: August 23, 1944 (aged 79) Woodlawn, 208 Canning Highway, East Fremantle
- Spouse: Ann Rachel Locke (née White) (–1951)
- Children: Doris, Glad, and Bill

Herbert John Locke (1864–1944) was Mayor of East Fremantle, Western Australia from 1924–1931 and 1934–1944. He married Ann Rachel White in 1893.

A furniture factory, Locke's Ltd. in Ada Street, South Fremantle was founded by Herbert's brother Charles James Locke.

Herbert Locke owned land in White Gum Valley.

A park, Locke Park, on the corner of Moss and Fletcher streets in East Fremantle, is named in his honour.
