= Auvergne Doherty =

Australian businesswoman (1896–1961)

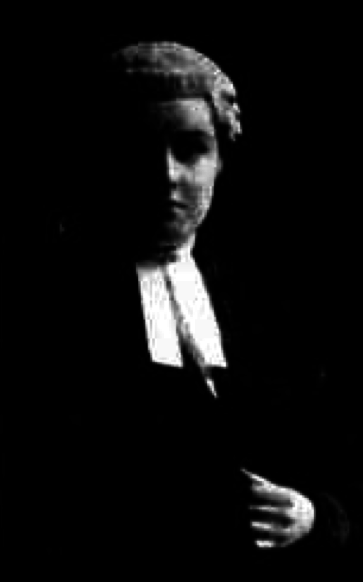
- Born: Auvergne Mary Doherty; 3 October 1896; Perth, Western Australia
- Died: 3 January 1961 (64 years); Royal Perth Hospital, Shenton Park, Western Australia
- Burial place: Karrakatta Cemetery
- Other name: Vergne
- Education: Convent of H.C.J., London; Oxford University (M.A., B.A.)
- Occupations: Company director of connor, doherty & durack
- Parents: Denis Doherty (father); Georgina Cable (mother)

Auvergne Mary Doherty (3 October 1896 – 3 January 1961) was an Australian businesswoman, working in her family's cattle business. She was one of the first nine women called to the bar in England; Doherty was the first Western Australian woman called to the English Bar; she did not go on to practise law in England or Western Australia. Instead, Doherty took over her father's business when he died in 1935.

== Life ==
Auvergne Doherty was born in Perth, Western Australia, the second daughter of Denis and Georgina Doherty. Auvergne was raised abroad, attending Convent schools in Belgium and England, one of which included the Convent of Holy Child Jesus in Cavendish Square, London. In 1916, Auvergne passed the Responsions exams for Oxford University; she graduated and matriculated on 30 October 1920. Auvergne was among the first of nine women called to the Bar in England in 1922, following the enactment of the Sex Disqualification (Removal) Act 1919; she was the first Commonwealth Citizen and Western Australian called to the English Bar. Despite gaining admission to Middle Temple, Auvergne did not go on to practise law most likely due to her family's declining financial circumstances.

Before returning to Western Australia in 1930, with her father Denis Doherty and sister, Dorothy, Auvergne held a secretarial role at the British Drama League. When her father died in 1935, Auvergne took over his cattle business with Mr Michael Durack, in the Northern Territory. Four years before the company was wound up in 1950, Auvergne resigned as the company director. Auvergne died on 3 January 1961. She is buried at Karrakatta Cemetery, Western Australia, in the Roman Catholic portion next to her father.

== Education ==
Auvergne Doherty was educated abroad at Convent schools in Belgium and London, attending the Convent of Holy Child Jesus, 11 Cavendish Square, London. After the Convent of H.C.J., Auvergne attended Oxford University (1916–1919). On 30 October 1920, Auvergne returned to Oxford to matriculate and graduate; from Michaelmas term 1920, women who had previously passed examinations, which would have qualified a man for a degree, were able to return to matriculate and graduate. The degree of MA was awarded on 28 June 1923.

== Call to the Bar ==
Auvergne Doherty applied for admission to Middle Temple on 5 January 1920. Just over two years later, she was 'screened' for Call on 24 October 1922 and formally called to the Bar on 17 November 1922.

Auvergne Doherty was among the first cohort of women called to the Bar, along with Theodora Llewellyn-Davis, Helena Normanton, Monica Geikie Cobb, Ethel Bright Ashford, Elsie Wheeler, Beatrice Davy, Sybil Campbell and Dr Ivy Williams. Ivy Williams was the first woman to be called to the Bar in 1922. Helena Normanton was the first woman law student and first woman barrister to practice in 1922. Carrie Morrison became the first women solicitor.

Auvergne Doherty was the first woman from Western Australia to be called to the English Bar. Doherty was not the first Australian woman to enter the legal profession; this title went to Flos Greig, who was admitted in August 1905. The next Western Australian woman called to the Bar was Alice Mary Cummins, in 1930. It was not until 1975 that the first woman, Valerie French, signed the Bar Roll and practised as a barrister in Western Australia. In Western Australia, when one signs on to only practice as a Barrister, you sign the Bar Roll. That means that women did practice before this date but not specifically as barristers.

Auvergne Doherty did not pursue a career in law. Instead, it is noted that she became a secretary for the British Drama League before returning to Perth in 1930 when she took over her father's business.

On Auvergne's gravestone BLL, 1922 is written. Her call and admission were widely reported in British and Australian newspapers at the time but she is not considered Perth's first woman lawyer. The omission of Doherty as one of the 'firsts' could be because she did not practise law either in England or Western Australia and her story is not well-known. Charlotte Coleman, PhD Candidate at St Mary's University, argues that Auvergne could not practise because of her family's declining financial circumstances and argues that Doherty’s biography is important because it evidences how vital it was to have the necessary financial means and networks to be able to forget a career at the Bar. It was precisely the lack of these factors that impeded Doherty to fulfil her career as a barrister.

== See also ==
- First women lawyers around the world
