= Leonard Bolton =

Australian politician

Leonard Burlington Bolton

Member of the Legislative Council of Western Australia for Metropolitan Province
- In office 6 February 1932 – 23 March 1948

Personal details
- Born: 1 August 1879
- Died: 23 March 1948
- Party: Liberal
- Other political affiliations: Nationalist (until 1945)
- Relatives: Harry Bolton (brother)

Leonard Burlington Bolton (1 August 1879 – 23 March 1948) was an Australian politician. He was a member of the Western Australian Legislative Council representing the Metropolitan Province from his election on 6 February 1932 until the end of his term in 1948. Bolton was a member of the Nationalist Party which later became the Liberal Party.

From November 1909 to November 1914, Bolton was a councillor for the Municipality of East Fremantle. From November 1914 to November 1919, he was the mayor of East Fremantle. From November 1919 to November 1925, he was a councillor again. From April 1924 to April 1931, he was on the Murray Road Board.
