= List of mayors of Melville =

The City of Melville in Perth, Western Australia was originally established on 14 December 1900 as the East Fremantle Road Board with a chairman and councillors under the Roads Boards Act 1871. It was renamed Melville six months later, and with the passage of the Local Government Act 1960, all road boards became Shires with a shire president and councillors effective 1 July 1961. The Shire of Melville was declared a town on 28 September 1962, at which point the president became a mayor. Melville attained city status on 3 May 1968.

== Chairmen ==
Chairman	Term
H. A. Corbet	1901–1904
J. McKimmie	1904–1905
M. N. Buzacott	1905–1905
L. Ellson	1905–1906
C. M. Purdie	1906–1907
William Murray	1907–1909
C. M. Purdie	1909–1909
William Murray	1909–1911
R. Gordon	1911–1913
M. H. Hillary	1913–1915
William Murray	1915–1919
R. Gordon	1919–1920
William Murray	1920–1925
J. T. Denney	1925–1926
V. G. C. Riseley	1926–1928
Herbert John Locke	1928–1932
P. S. Jane	1932–1932
Ethelbert Furney Edwardes	1932–1943
William Charles Reynolds	1943–1945
Alick Hammond Bracks	1945–1954
William Richard Brown	1954–1957
Alick Hammond Bracks	1957–1961
Ronald Francis Carroll	1961

== Shire presidents ==
Shire president	Term
Ronald Francis Carroll	1961–1962

== Mayors ==
Mayor	Term
Ronald Francis Carroll	1962–1971
Ken Hurst	1971–1973
Jack Howson	1973–1989
June Barton	1989–1995
Katherine Jackson^{[1]}	1995–2007
Russell Aubrey	2007–2019
George Gear	2019–2023
Katy Mair^{[2]}	2023–

^{1} Known under her maiden name Katy Mair until 2003.
^{2} Second tenure.
