= Robert Laurie (Australian politician) =

Scottish-born Australian stevedore, harbour administrator and politician

Captain Robert Laurie
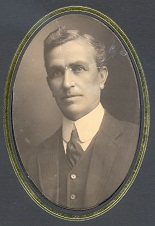

Member of the Western Australian Legislative Council
- In office 6 December 1901 – 21 May 1912
- Preceded by: Matthew Moss
- Succeeded by: Robert Lynn
- Constituency: West Province

Personal details
- Born: 1855 Glasgow, Scotland, United Kingdom
- Died: 11 November 1941 West Perth, Western Australia, Australia
- Occupation: Businessman, Harbour administrator, Politician

Captain Robert Laurie (1855 – 11 November 1941) was a Scottish-born Australian politician and harbour administrator. He served as a member of the Western Australian Legislative Council for West Province from 1901 to 1912. He was the first chairman of the Fremantle Harbour Trust from 1903 to 1905 and a key figure in the early development of the Port of Fremantle

== Early life ==
Laurie was born in 1855 in Glasgow, Scotland, the son of Robert Laurie and Jessie Frew. He went to sea at the age of 14 and joined the Adelaide Steamship Company. In 1880 the company posted him to Fremantle, Western Australia, where he initially worked as a stevedore.

== Early career ==
Around 1891 Laurie established his own stevedoring business in Fremantle. He became known as "Captain Laurie" through his maritime experience. He advocated for improved marine standards at the newly opened port to attract international shipping.

== Political career ==
Before being elevated to the Legislative Council, Laurie was a member of the Fremantle Municipal Council. Laurie was elected to the Western Australian Legislative Council for West Province at a ministerial by-election on 6 December 1901, defeating sitting member Matthew Moss who had resigned upon his appointment to Colonial Secretary in the Alf Morgans cabinet. Ministerial by-elections normally remained uncontested, however recently ousted Premier George Leake put forward candidates to disrupt his newly formed government. Laurie was described as "The Leake Candidate".. In his maiden speech he made the Port of Fremantle a priority, suggesting a Harbour Board to manage the port efficiently and reduce costs for merchants and ship-owners. While continuing to serve as an MLC, Laurie was appointed the inaugural chairman of the Fremantle Harbour Trust in January 1903. Playing a part in the commercial operation and development of the newly completed harbour facilities. He served as an MLC until 21 May 1912 where he did not recontest his seat and was succeeded by Robert Lynn.

== Personal life ==
Laurie married Margaret Jane Armstrong on 1882. They had three daughters; Jessie, Minnie and Ida. Margaret died in early 1900, Robert married Mary Jane Powell in July that same year and had three sons: Robert, Wallace and Douglas He was a committeeman and life member of the Western Australian Turf Club and patron of the Fremantle Rowing Club.

== Death ==
Laurie died on 11 November 1941 at West Perth, Western Australia, aged about 86. His second wife, Mary, had died the previous month. He was buried in Fremantle Cemetery.
