= Morgans ministry =

The Morgans Ministry was the fourth ministry of the Government of Western Australia, led by Alf Morgans of the Ministerialist faction. It succeeded the First Leake Ministry on 21 November 1901, and was followed by the Second Leake Ministry on 23 December 1901.

== Overview ==
The Ministry came about in part due to the circumstances of the 1901 election, whose result had been indecisive. The First Leake Ministry fell through a 24-22 vote of no confidence on 9 November. Leake advised the Governor to dissolve Parliament, but the request was declined and on 12 November, Leake advised the Legislative Assembly that as soon as the Supply Bill had passed a third reading, his government would resign.

At first, Leader of the Opposition Frederick Henry Piesse was asked to form a Ministry, but on 18 November he advised that he had been unable to form an acceptable Ministry, and Alf Morgans was sent for. Three days later, the Morgans Ministry was sworn in by the Governor.

As was the law at the time, having accepted offices of profit under the Crown, the Ministers were required to resign their seats and contest them at ministerial by-elections. According to Brian de Garis (Stannage, p. 348), Leake and his supporters set about "the best organised campaigning the state had ever witnessed" for the by-elections, and three of the ministers—Frank Wilson, Matthew Moss and Frederick Moorhead were defeated. Morgans, Quinlan and Nanson retained their seats.

This turn of events gave the Opposition a narrow majority with Independent or Labour support. As such, the Morgans Ministry resigned on 20 December 1901, and three days later, George Leake formed a new ministry which could maintain the confidence of the Assembly.

== Members ==
The members of the Morgans ministry were:

Office	Minister
Premier; Colonial Treasurer	Alf Morgans
Attorney-General	Frederick Moorhead
Minister for Works	Timothy Quinlan
Minister for Lands	John Nanson
Minister for Mines; Commissioner of Railways	Frank Wilson
Colonial Secretary	Matthew Moss

Preceded by First Leake Ministry	Morgans Ministry; 1901	Succeeded by Second Leake Ministry
