= Ethel Bright Ashford =

English barrister and politician (1883–1980)

Ethel Bright Ashford (1883–1980) was an English politician and one of the first women barristers. She was a local councillor for Marylebone, and was involved in social work.

== Early life and education ==
She was born in Beckenham, Kent on March 18, 1883, the fourth of five children of Henry Bright Ashford and his wife Lydia, née Bridges. She attended Croydon High School and gained a BA from the University of London in 1906, and then pursued postgraduate study in social work and history at Woodbrooke College, Birmingham, the London School of Economics, and Bryn Mawr, Pennsylvania from 1908 to 1912.

== Early career ==
In 1912, Ashford was appointed Assistant Inspector and Official Lecturer for the National Health Insurance Commission. This work was interrupted by World War I, when she became managing director of the family business, Ashford & Ashford hosiery manufacturers, between 1917 and 1919 while her brothers were at war. During this time she became involved in the Women's Municipal Party, which advocated for women in politics and recommended that women be admitted to the bar; and she co-wrote A Handbook to Local Government (1918) with Edith Place.

In 1919 she was elected to St Marylebone Borough Council as a councillor for Park Crescent Ward, a position she held until 1953.

== Legal career ==
When the Sex Disqualification (Removal) Act was passed at the end of 1919, Ashford joined Middle Temple as soon as it reopened after Christmas and began studying for the bar. She was called to the Bar along with Helena Normanton (who had been admitted to Middle Temple two weeks before her) on November 17, 1922.

Ashford had a tenancy in New Court Chambers and did criminal and common law work, with a particular emphasis on local government law. She found her legal work 'intensely interesting' but not sufficient to fill her time or her financial needs. As well as continuing her local government work, she travelled around the country speaking to women's groups.

She published Local Government: A Simple Treatise in 1929 and co-authored three books on Glen's law with Randolph and Alexander Glen between 1933 and 1936, among other works on law and local history.

== Later life ==
In 1939 she travelled to Nazi Germany with a pro-fascist group, The Link.

Her causes in later life centred around civic planning and the preservation of rural areas, including a campaign against air pollution with the Campaign to Protect Rural England in 1944.

Ashford died aged 97 in June 1980, at St Mary's nursing home in Broadstairs, Kent.
