= Second Leake ministry =

Fifth Ministry of the Government of Western Australia

The Second Leake Ministry was the fifth Ministry of the Government of Western Australia and was led by Premier George Leake, who had hitherto been the Leader of the Opposition. It succeeded the Morgans Ministry on 23 December 1901 after a series of ministerial by-elections to confirm that ministry resulted in half of the ministry being defeated by Opposition and Labour candidates. On 24 June 1902, Leake died unexpectedly at age 45, and a week later, Walter James was chosen to replace him and the James Ministry was sworn in on 1 July 1902.

The members of the Second Leake Ministry were:

Office	Minister
Premier; Attorney-General	George Leake, MLA^{[1]}
Colonial Treasurer; Colonial Secretary	Frederick Illingworth, MLA
Commissioner of Railways	Walter Kingsmill, MLA
Minister for Works	Hector Rason, MLA
Minister for Mines	Henry Gregory, MLA
Minister for Lands	Adam Jameson, MLC
Minister without portfolio	Joseph Holmes, MLA; Ephraim Clarke, MLC

^{1} Leake died in office on 24 June 1902.

Preceded by Morgans Ministry	Second Leake Ministry; 1901–1902	Succeeded by James Ministry
