= William Angwin =

Australian politician (1863–1944)

Deputy Premier of Western Australia
- In office 17 April 1924 – 24 March 1927
- Preceded by: John Ewing
- Succeeded by: John Willcock
- Constituency: East Fremantle, NE Fremantle

Personal details
- Born: 8 May 1863 St Just in Penwith, Cornwall, England
- Died: 9 June 1944 (aged 81) East Fremantle, Western Australia
- Party: Labor
- Spouse: Sarah Sumpton
- Profession: Carpenter

Caricature by David Low

William Charles Angwin (8 May 1863 – 9 June 1944) was an Australian politician who was Deputy Premier of Western Australia from 1924 until 1927, and Agent-General for Western Australia in London from 1927 until 1933. Born in Cornwall, England, he worked as a carpenter and builder before moving to Australia. He was a founding member of the East Fremantle Municipal Council and a member of the Western Australian Legislative Assembly for the Labor Party from 1904 until 1927, representing the seats of East Fremantle and North-East Fremantle.

== Early years ==
Angwin was born in St Just in Penwith, Cornwall, England, to Benjamin Angwin, a tin miner, and Mary Angwin (née Taylor). He was educated locally at a Methodist school before being apprenticed to a carpenter. He left Cornwall in 1882 to work as a builder in Whitehaven, Cumberland (now Cumbria), where he joined several reform movements and worked for temperance. On 3 July 1884, he married Sarah Ann Sumpton, with whom he was to have two sons and two daughters.

== Career ==
In 1886, he moved to Victoria, Australia, and in 1892 to Western Australia, where he worked as a carpenter for Sandover & Co. In 1897, he helped to form the East Fremantle Municipality, which he served as a councillor for 30 years. He was mayor from 1902 until 1904.

At the 1904 election, he won the East Fremantle seat in the Legislative Assembly from the conservative incumbent, Joseph Holmes, achieving a 26% swing. At the election the following year following the failure of the Daglish Ministry, Holmes won the seat back with a 20-vote majority. Angwin filed a petition against his return, and on 12 April 1906, the seat was declared vacant by the Chief Justice of the Supreme Court on the basis that 26 votes were incorrectly recorded. Holmes appealed, but was unsuccessful, and on 24 October 1906 a by-election was called, at which Angwin won 71.4% of the vote against another opponent. He won the six following elections until his retirement from politics in 1927 — two with big majorities and four unopposed.

When Labor came back to power under John Scaddan at the 1911 election, Angwin was made an honorary minister in the Scaddan Ministry. After the 1914 election, he became Minister for Works, in which he served until the ministry's defeat in a vote of confidence on 27 July 1916. He served on the Fremantle Municipal Tramway and Electric Lighting Board, the War Patriotic Fund for WA and the Fremantle Public Hospital Board during this time.

When Labor returned to power at the 1924 election, Angwin became Minister for Lands and Immigration. He retired from politics at the following election, and on 24 March 1927 was appointed Agent-General for Western Australia in London. He left England on 25 March 1933, and chaired two Royal Commissions on wheat in 1935 and 1938, and presided over the Rural Relief Trust in 1936.

== Death ==
Angwin died on 9 June 1944 in East Fremantle, and was buried in the Methodist section of Fremantle Cemetery. A street near the East Fremantle council chambers is named after him.

Political offices
| Preceded by Hal Colebatch | Agent-General for Western Australia; 1927–1933 | Succeeded by Hal Colebatch |
Parliament of Western Australia
| Preceded by Seat created | Member for Electoral district of North-East Fremantle; 1911–1927 | Succeeded by Francis Rowe |
| Preceded by John Ewing | Deputy Premier of Western Australia; 1924–1927 | Succeeded by John Willcock |
