= Denis Doherty =

Australian politician (1861–1935)

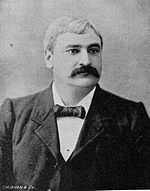
- Born: Denis Joseph Doherty; 1861; Newry, County Armagh, Ireland
- Died: 23 October 1935 (aged 74); Subiaco, Western Australia
- Resting place: Karrakatta Cemetery
- Occupations: Businessman; pastoralist
- Spouse: Georgina Cable
- Children: 4

Denis Joseph Doherty (1861 – 23 October 1935) was an Irish-Australian businessman, pastoralist and politician who served as a member of the Legislative Assembly of Western Australia from 1897 to 1903, representing the seat of North Fremantle.

Doherty was born in Newry, County Armagh, Ireland. He arrived in Australia in 1882, settling in Sydney. In 1886, he moved to Wyndham, a small town in Western Australia's Kimberley region, with a schoolmate from Ireland, Francis Connor. They went into partnership together, initially supplying goods to the Kimberley goldfields, and later went into the live cattle trade, acquiring two pastoral leases in the Northern Territory (Newry Station and Auvergne Station). In 1897, Connor and Doherty merged their business with that of Michael Durack, forming Connor, Doherty & Durack.

Doherty first stood for parliament at the 1895 North Fremantle by-election, but was defeated by Matthew Moss. He stood again at the 1897 general election, and defeated three other candidates. He did not live in the area, but had business interests there. Doherty was re-elected at the 1901 election, but resigned from parliament in August 1903 to travel to England on business. The resulting by-election was won by John Ferguson. Doherty returned to Australia in 1930, and died in Subiaco, Perth, in 1935, aged 74. He had married Georgina Cable in 1888, with whom he had five children but only four survived: George Roy Doherty, Kathleen Doherty, Auvergne Doherty and Dorothy Doherty.

== The Doherty children ==
George Roy Doherty (1893–1966), also known as Roy, enlisted in the army as a driver in 1914 at the age of 21. In 1917 he received a Military Medal for ‘coolness and particular devotion to duty when in charge of [a] Lorry’ during an enemy attack. After the First World War, he returned to Perth and went into farming. On 23 June 1924, he married Dorothea Haynes; the couple had a son, Gordon Doherty, who was possibly adopted. Dorothea Haynes was six years his senior, born on 12 February 1887; she was a government school teacher in Western Australia between 1907 and 1942; however, she did not teach between 1924 and 1934. George died on 1 October 1966 at the age of 73 of a heart attack. On his Death Certificate, his occupation is listed as 'retired grazier' and he is buried at Karrakatta Cemetery.

Kathleen Doherty (1894 – ?), also known as ‘Katch’, was educated abroad attending schools in England and Germany; she was said to have developed a ‘talent for drawing’. During the First World War (1914–1918), Kathleen was a ‘motordriver’; she drove an ambulance in France towards the end of the war. After the war, she became a masseuse or physiotherapist in London and Jersey, she left Jersey on 21 July 1940 following German Occupation, returning briefly to Perth in 1941. Kathleen spent the rest of the war possibly in Woking, Surrey. In 1944 she filed an application to return to Jersey but it is not clear if she returned to the country. In 1956 Kathleen returned to Perth after her sister, Dorothy, had a stroke in 1956. There is no record of Kathleen marrying or having children. When she filed the application to return to Jersey (1944) she was 50 and listed as ‘single’. Kathleen's death is not recorded in the Western Australian Archives, which perhaps indicates that she did not die in that country.

Auvergne Doherty, M.A., B.A. (3 October 1896 – 3 January 1964) was raised abroad, attending Convent schools in Berlin and England, one of which included the Convent of H.C.J. in Cavendish Square, London. In 1916, Auvergne passed the Responsions exams for Oxford University; she graduated and matriculated on 30 October 1920. Auvergne was among the first of nine women Called to the Bar in England in 1922, following the enactment of the Sex Disqualification (Removal) Act 1919. In 1930 Auvergne returned to Western Australia with her father and sister, Dorothy. When her father died in 1935, Auvergne took over his cattle business with Mr Michael Durack, in the Northern Territory. Auvergne died on 3 January 1961.

Dorothy Leam Doherty (1900–1963), also known as ‘Bylly’ or ‘Billee’, presumably followed the same educational path as her other siblings, being educated abroad, possibly in England, Belgium and/or Germany. To date, not much is known about Bylly's life before she returned to Perth in 1930. After her father's death in 1935 Bylly became an assistant for the company; she left the firm to marry Frank Downey in 1947. Bylly died on 25 December 1963, aged 63.

Parliament of Western Australia
Preceded by Matthew Moss	Member for North Fremantle; 1897–1903	Succeeded by John Ferguson
