= Electoral district of North Fremantle =

Former electoral district in Western Australia

North Fremantle Western Australia—Legislative Assembly
- State: Western Australia
- Dates current: 1890–1911
- Namesake: North Fremantle

North Fremantle was an electoral district of the Legislative Assembly in the Australian state of Western Australia from 1890 to 1911.

Based in urban North Fremantle, the district was one of the original 30 seats contested at the 1890 election.

The Labour league candidates were not always successful in early elections.

The district ceased to exist at the 1911 election when it was amalgamated with the neighbouring district of East Fremantle into the new district of North-East Fremantle. Its member at the time, Harry Bolton of the Labor Party, transferred to the seat of South Fremantle.

== Members ==
Member	Party	Term
William Silas Pearse	Non-aligned	1890–1895
Matthew Moss	Non-aligned	1895–1897
Denis Doherty	Ministerial	1897–1903
John Ferguson	Opposition	1903–1904
Harry Bolton	Labor	1904–1911
