= John Maxwell Ferguson =

Australian politician

John Ferguson
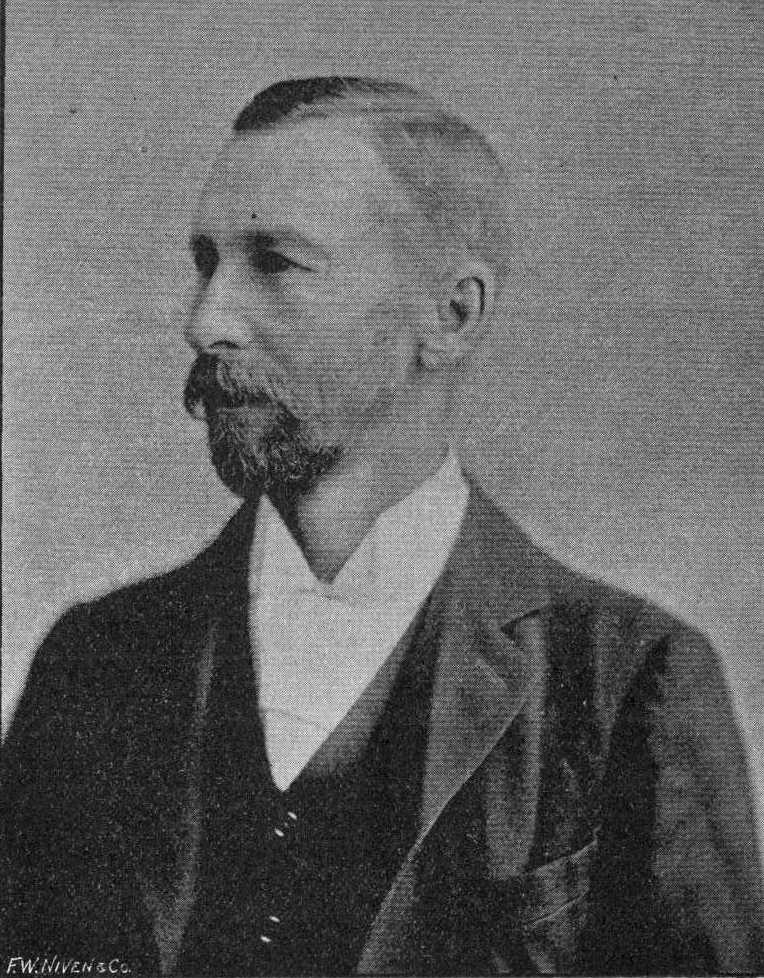

Member of the Legislative Assembly of Western Australia
- In office 11 December 1903 – 28 June 1904
- Preceded by: Denis Doherty
- Succeeded by: Harry Bolton
- Constituency: North Fremantle

Personal details
- Born: 28 April 1841 Dundee, Scotland
- Died: 2 August 1924 (aged 83) Mount Lawley, Western Australia

John Maxwell Ferguson (28 April 1841 – 2 August 1924) was an Australian businessman, politician, and philanthropist. He had business interests in several different industries in Western Australia, and was prominent in the state's Presbyterian community. Ferguson served in the Legislative Assembly of Western Australia from 1903 to 1904, representing the seat of North Fremantle.

== Early life ==
Ferguson was born in Dundee, Scotland, to Isabella (née Maxwell) and John Ferguson. His family moved to Western Australia when he was an infant, where his father, a physician, was appointed colonial surgeon (the colony's chief medical officer). Ferguson was initially educated at Bishop Hale's School, and then sent back to Scotland to attend the High School of Dundee. After leaving school, he joined the Merchant Navy, eventually becoming captain of his own ship. In 1867, Ferguson returned to Western Australia, settling in Fremantle. There, he acquired the schooner Airlie, which he used to trade with Singapore and China.

== Business career ==
In 1871, Ferguson acquired the lease of the Stanley Brewery. The following year, he went into partnership with William Mumme, a German expatriate with previous experience in the brewing trade. In 1874, the firm of Ferguson and Mumme acquired the Swan Brewery, which they relocated to the site of a freshwater spring at the foot of Mount Eliza. Ferguson sold his share in the brewery in 1886, and went into business as a general merchant in Fremantle, partnering with William Dalgety Moore. He established his own hardware business in 1889, and over the following years acquired interests in a number of saw mills in the South West.

== Politics and later life ==
Ferguson entered politics in 1903, winning that year's North Fremantle state by-election, which had been caused by the resignation of Denis Doherty, the member for North Fremantle. His time in parliament was short-lived, however, as he was defeated by the Labour candidate, Harry Bolton. Ferguson remained involved in public life for some time, and was prominent in Perth's Presbyterian community. He financed a relocation of Scotch College in 1904, and in 1915 was involved in the establishment of Presbyterian Ladies' College. He eventually retired to Mount Lawley, where he died in 1924, aged 83. Ferguson's nephew, Percy Douglas Ferguson, was also a member of parliament.

Parliament of Western Australia
Preceded by Denis Doherty	Member for North Fremantle; 1903–1904	Succeeded by Harry Bolton
