= Robert Lynn (Australian politician) =

Australian businessman and politician

The Honourable Robert Lynn
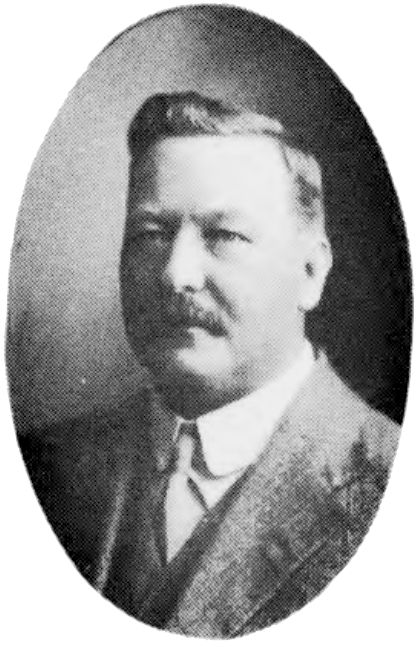

Member of the Legislative Council of Western Australia
- In office 22 May 1912 – 21 May 1924
- Preceded by: Robert Laurie
- Succeeded by: William Kitson
- Constituency: West Province

Personal details
- Born: 14 March 1873 Stockton, New South Wales, Australia
- Died: 12 September 1928 (aged 55) West Perth, Western Australia, Australia
- Party: Nationalist

Robert John Lynn (14 March 1873 – 12 September 1928) was an Australian businessman and politician who served as a member of the Legislative Council of Western Australia from 1912 to 1924. Prior to entering politics, he had been prominent in the coal industry, although he had business interests across multiple sectors.

== Early life and business career ==
Lynn was born in Stockton, New South Wales (on the Hunter River), to Mary (née McKindley) and Richard Lynn. His father was an American-born shipwright, while his mother was Scottish. Lynn left school at the age of 14, working as a clerk with a wholesale business in Newcastle. He arrived in Western Australia in 1895, during the gold rushes, and spent one year prospecting at Coolgardie before settling in Fremantle, where he worked as a clerk for a shipping firm.

After a series of joint ventures with other partners, Lynn eventually went into business himself. In 1919, his firm amalgamated with another company (becoming Johnson & Lynn Ltd.), and expanded into the coal trade. They supplied capital to run-down coal leases in the Collie district, and eventually consolidated their interests into Amalgamated Collieries Ltd., which from the early 1920s had a near monopoly on the coalfields. Outside of the coal industry, Lynn served as managing director of six other companies at various points, across a wide range of industries.

== Politics and later life ==
In 1904, Lynn was elected to the Fremantle Municipal Council, serving until 1909. He entered parliament for the Liberal Party at the 1912 Legislative Council election, replacing Robert Laurie as one of the three members in West Province. Lynn joined the newly formed Nationalist Party in 1917, and was re-elected for another six-year term the following year. He retired from parliament in 1924, at the end of his second term. While in parliament, Lynn served as patron of the East Fremantle Football Club from 1912 to 1918. The club's best and fairest award, the Lynn Medal, is named in his honour. Lynn died in Perth in September 1928, of nephritis. He had married Ada Turton in 1901, with whom he had three children. A great-granddaughter, June Craig, was also a member of parliament.

== See also ==
- Members of the Western Australian Legislative Council
