= First Leake ministry =

Third Ministry of the Government of Western Australia

The First Leake Ministry was the third Ministry of the Government of Western Australia and was led by Premier George Leake, who had hitherto been the Leader of the Opposition. It succeeded the Throssell Ministry on 27 May 1901 after George Throssell's resignation as premier following the inconclusive result of the April 1901 state election.

On Saturday 9 November 1901 at shortly before 5:00am, a vote of no confidence in the Ministry passed by 24 votes to 22. Leake advised the Governor to dissolve Parliament, but the request was declined and on 12 November, Leake advised the Legislative Assembly that as soon as the Supply Bill had passed a third reading, his government would resign.

On 21 November 1901, following a failed attempt by Frederick Henry Piesse to form a ministry, the First Leake Ministry officially resigned and was followed by the Morgans Ministry led by Alf Morgans.

The members of the First Leake Ministry were:

Office	Minister
Premier; Attorney-General	George Leake
Colonial Treasurer; Colonial Secretary	Frederick Illingworth
Minister for Works	Walter Kingsmill
Minister for Lands	Charles Sommers
Commissioner of Railways	Joseph Holmes
Minister for Mines	Henry Gregory
Minister without portfolio (from 28 June 1901)	Adam Jameson; Walter James

Preceded by Throssell Ministry	First Leake Ministry; 1901	Succeeded by Morgans Ministry
