= Joseph Allen (Australian politician) =

Australian politician

Joseph Francis Allen (6 August 1869 – 23 May 1933) was an Australian politician.

== Life ==
Born at Perranzabuloe in Cornwall to carpenter William Allen and Salome Williams, he came to Parramatta in 1879 and from 1884 worked as an articled clerk to a Sydney architect, subsequently becoming a civil engineer. After moving to Western Australia in 1894, he married Jean Symington Buntine on 25 September 1900. In 1903 Allen was elected to East Fremantle Municipality, on which he would continue to serve (with a one-year break) until his death. He was mayor from 1909 to 1914. In 1914 he was elected to the Western Australian Legislative Council as a Liberal member. He was Chairman of Committees from 1919 until his defeat in the 1920 election. He continued to be active in what became the Nationalist Party and advocated greater cooperation with the new Country Party; his strident support for electoral pacts led to his resignation as president of the Western Australian Nationalist Party in 1926. He was re-elected mayor of East Fremantle in 1931 but died suddenly in 1933; his body was found in the Swan River, but the coroner ruled no suspicious circumstances. Allen is buried at Fremantle Cemetery.
