= Electoral district of East Fremantle =

Former electoral district in Western Australia

East Fremantle Western Australia—Legislative Assembly
- State: Western Australia
- Dates current: 1897–1911
- Namesake: East Fremantle

East Fremantle was an electoral district of the Legislative Assembly in the Australian state of Western Australia from 1897 to 1911.

Based in urban East Fremantle, the district was first contested at the 1897 election. Its first member was Ministerialist Joseph Holmes who was defeated by William Angwin of the Labor Party at the 1904 election. Holmes turned the tables by defeating Angwin at the 1905 election, however this result was successfully challenged and Angwin won the subsequent by-election. The district ceased to exist at the 1911 election when it was amalgamated with the neighbouring district of North Fremantle into the new district of North-East Fremantle, which then became Angwin's new seat.

== Members ==
Member	Party	Term
Joseph Holmes	Ministerial	1897–1904
William Angwin	Labour	1904–1905
Joseph Holmes	Ministerial	1905–1906
William Angwin	Labour	1906–1911
