= Joseph John Holmes =

Australian politician

The Honourable Joseph Holmes
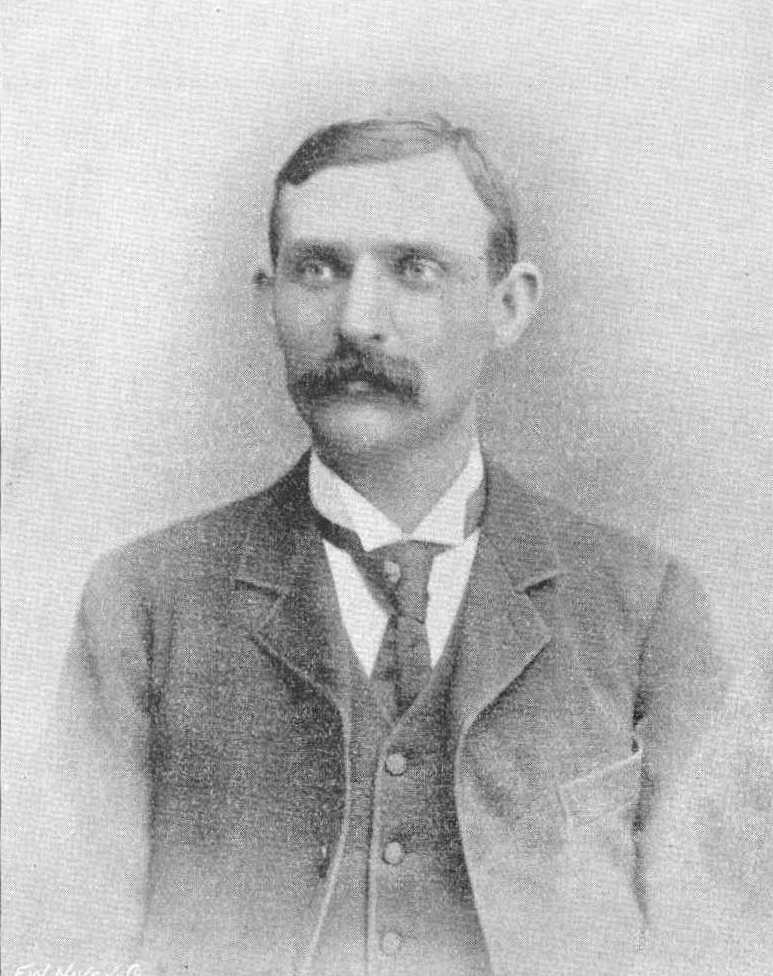

Member of the Legislative Assembly of Western Australia
- In office 5 May 1897 – 28 June 1904
- Preceded by: None (new seat)
- Succeeded by: William Angwin
- Constituency: East Fremantle
- In office 27 October 1905 – 24 April 1906
- Preceded by: William Angwin
- Succeeded by: William Angwin
- Constituency: East Fremantle

Member of the Legislative Council of Western Australia
- In office 21 March 1914 – 25 April 1942
- Preceded by: Richard Pennefather
- Succeeded by: Cyril Cornish
- Constituency: North Province

Personal details
- Born: 24 May 1866 Mandurah, Western Australia
- Died: 25 April 1942 (aged 75) Perth, Western Australia

Joseph John Holmes (24 May 1866 – 25 April 1942) was an Australian politician who served in both houses of the Parliament of Western Australia. A minister in both governments of George Leake, he was a member of the Legislative Assembly from 1897 to 1904 and again from 1905 to 1906, and later a member of the Legislative Council from 1914 until his death.

== Early life ==
Holmes was born in Mandurah, Western Australia, to Maria (née Wilson) and Robert Holmes. After leaving school, he worked in Mandurah for a time, and then went to Fremantle, where he founded a meat processing firm with his three brothers. The firm, Holmes Brothers, later expanded to Perth and to the Eastern Goldfields (during the gold rushes of the 1890s), generating large profits. Holmes was elected to the Fremantle Municipal Council in 1893, and served until 1898.

== Legislative Assembly ==
At the 1897 general election, Holmes won the newly created seat of East Fremantle, defeating Matthew Moss by just six votes. He was re-elected at the 1901 election, and subsequently appointed to the ministry formed by the new premier, George Leake, as Commissioner for Railways. The Leake government fell in November 1901, and Holmes was not retained as a minister under Alf Morgans. However, Leake returned as premier a month later, and made Holmes a minister without portfolio, a position which he held until Leake's death in June 1902.

At the 1904 state election, Holmes was defeated in East Fremantle by a Labor candidate, William Angwin. He reclaimed his seat at the 1905 election, winning by only 20 votes. However, that result was overturned by the Supreme Court of Western Australia in April 1906, due to issues of voter fraud. Holmes attempted to appeal this decision to the High Court of Australia, but was unsuccessful. Owing to the legal proceedings, the necessary by-election (which Holmes did not contest) was not held until November 1906.

== Legislative Council and later years ==
After leaving parliament, Holmes concentrated on his business interests for several years. He was elected unopposed as Mayor of Fremantle in November 1910, but resigned exactly one week after being sworn in, stating he had been misled about the state of the town finances. Holmes re-entered parliament in 1914, winning a Legislative Council by-election for North Province (caused by the death of Richard Pennefather). Standing as an independent, he was re-elected in 1914, 1920, 1926, 1932, and 1938, on each occasion unopposed. Holmes died in Perth in April 1942, aged 75, and was buried at Karrakatta Cemetery. He had married Marjorie Jane Tighe in 1897, with whom he had four children.

== See also ==
- List of mayors of Fremantle

Parliament of Western Australia
Preceded by New seat William Angwin	Member for East Fremantle; 1897–1904; 1905–1906	Succeeded by William Angwin; William Angwin
Political offices
Preceded by Barrington Wood	Commissioner for Railways; 1901	Succeeded by Frank Wilson
