= Town of East Fremantle =

Local government area in Perth, Western Australia

Coordinates: 32°02′17″S 115°46′05″E

- Local government area
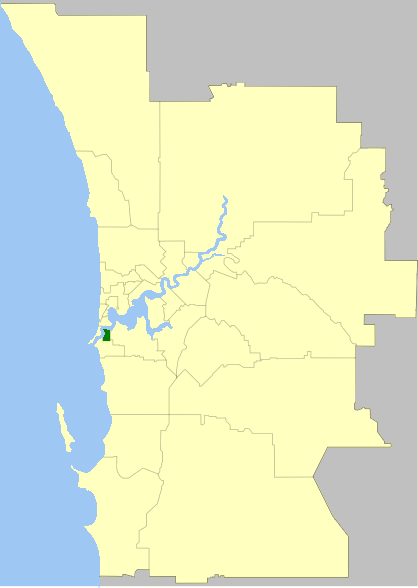
- The Town of East Fremantle within the Perth Metropolitan Area

- Interactive map of Town of East Fremantle
- Country: Australia
- State: Western Australia
- Region: South Metropolitan Perth
- Established: 1897
- Council seat: East Fremantle

Government
  - Mayor: Jim O'Neill
  - State electorate: Fremantle
  - Federal division: Fremantle

Area
  - Total: 3.1 km^{2} (1.2 sq mi)

Population
  - Total: 7,819 (LGA 2021)
- Website: Town of East Fremantle
LGAs around Town of East Fremantle
	Mosman Park
Fremantle	Town of East Fremantle	Melville
	Fremantle

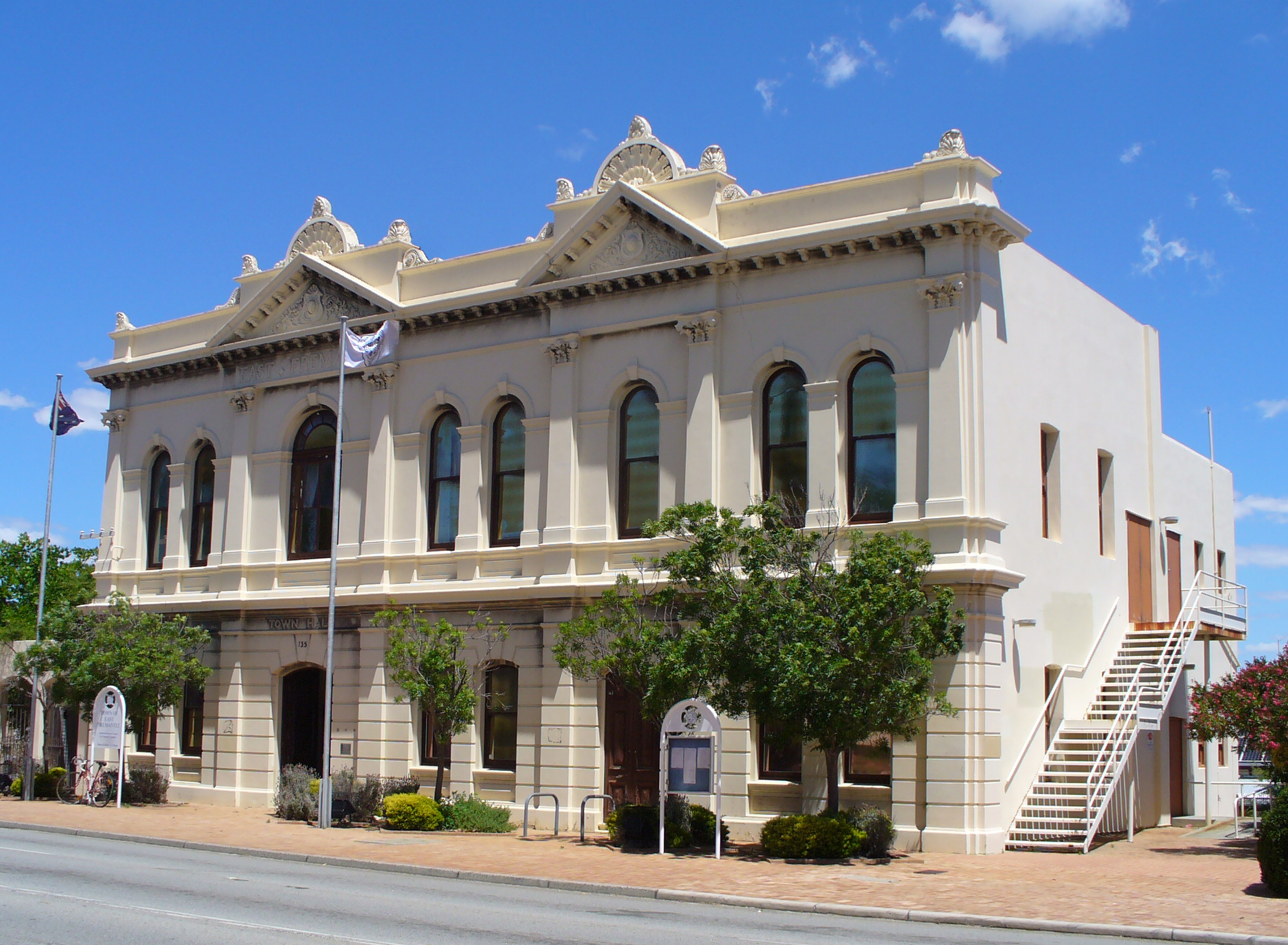
The East Fremantle Town Hall in November 2011

The Town of East Fremantle is a local government area in the southern suburbs of the Western Australian capital city of Perth. It is located immediately northeast of the port city of Fremantle and about 17 kilometres (11 mi) southwest of Perth's central business district. The Town covers an area of 3.1 square kilometres (1.2 sq mi), maintains 46 km of roads and had a population of over 7,000 as at the 2016 Census.

== History ==
The Municipality of East Fremantle was gazetted on 2 April 1897. On 1 July 1961, it became a town following the enactment of the Local Government Act 1960.

== Wards ==
The town is divided into four wards, each electing two councillors. Each councillor serves a four-year term, and half-elections are held every two years. The mayor is directly elected.

- Mayor: Jim O'Neill (elected 2017)
- Preston Point Ward: Michael McPhail (2017) and Tony Natale (2019)
- Richmond Ward: Andrew McPhail (2017) and Dean Nardi (2019)
- Plympton Ward: Jenny Harrington (2017) and Cliff Collinson (2019)
- Woodside Ward: Tony Watkins (2017) and Kerry Donovan (2019)

== Suburbs ==
- East Fremantle

== Population ==
Historical population

Year	Pop.	±% p.a.
1911	3,017	—
1921	4,423	+3.90%
1933	5,118	+1.22%
1947	6,197	+1.38%
1954	6,372	+0.40%
1961	6,542	+0.38%
1966	6,908	+1.09%
1971	7,325	+1.18%
1976	6,452	−2.51%

Year	Pop.	±% p.a.
1981	6,169	−0.89%
1986	5,678	−1.65%
1991	6,398	+2.42%
1996	6,188	−0.67%
2001	6,327	+0.45%
2006	6,697	+1.14%
2011	6,930	+0.69%
2016	7,376	+1.26%
2021	7,819	+1.17%

== Heritage listed places ==
As of 2024, 1,146 places are heritage-listed in the Town of East Fremantle, of which fifteen are on the State Register of Heritage Places.

== See also ==
- List of mayors of East Fremantle
