= Electoral results for the district of Claremont =

Australian state election results

This is a list of electoral results for the Electoral district of Claremont in Western Australian state elections.

== Members for Claremont ==
Member	Party	Term
William Sayer	Ministerial	1901–1902
John Foulkes	Ministerial	1902–1911
Evan Wisdom	Liberal	1911–1917
John Stewart	Nationalist	1917–1918
Thomas Duff	Nationalist	1918–1921
John Thomson	Nationalist	1921–1924
John Thomson	Ind. Nationalist	1924
Charles North	Nationalist	1924–1945
Charles North	Liberal	1945–1949
Charles North	LCL	1949–1956
Bill Crommelin	LCL	1956–1968

== Election results ==
=== Elections in the 1960s ===
1965 Western Australian state election: Claremont
Party	Candidate	Votes	%	±%
Liberal and Country	Harold Crommelin	7,171	77.0	+8.8
Labor	John Henshaw	2,141	23.0	+23.0
Total formal votes		9,312	97.2	−0.4
Informal votes		265	2.8	+0.4
Turnout		9,577	91.1	−0.1
Liberal and Country hold		Swing	+8.8	

1962 Western Australian state election: Claremont
Party	Candidate	Votes	%	±%
Liberal and Country	Harold Crommelin	6,243	68.2	
Independent Liberal	John Smith	2,908	31.8	
Total formal votes		9,151	97.6	
Informal votes		229	2.4	
Turnout		9,380	91.2	
Liberal and Country hold		Swing		

=== Elections in the 1950s ===
1959 Western Australian state election: Claremont
Party	Candidate	Votes	%	±%
Liberal and Country	Harold Crommelin	unopposed		
Liberal and Country hold		Swing		

1956 Western Australian state election: Claremont
Party	Candidate	Votes	%	±%
Liberal and Country	Harold Crommelin	3,239	41.5	
Liberal and Country	Laurence Snook	2,618	33.5	
Liberal and Country	Charles North	1,948	25.0	
Total formal votes		7,805	93.5	
Informal votes		541	6.5	
Turnout		8,346	91.2	
Two-candidate-preferred result
Liberal and Country	Harold Crommelin	4,295	55.0	
Liberal and Country	Laurence Snook	3,510	45.0	
Liberal and Country hold		Swing		

1953 Western Australian state election: Claremont
Party	Candidate	Votes	%	±%
Liberal and Country	Charles North	5,636	63.9	−36.1
Labor	Clifton Scott	3,185	36.1	+36.1
Total formal votes		8,821	98.9	
Informal votes		98	1.1	
Turnout		8,919	92.9	
Liberal and Country hold		Swing	N/A	

1950 Western Australian state election: Claremont
Party	Candidate	Votes	%	±%
Liberal and Country	Charles North	unopposed		
Liberal and Country hold		Swing		

=== Elections in the 1940s ===
1947 Western Australian state election: Claremont
Party	Candidate	Votes	%	±%
Liberal	Charles North	5,092	65.0	+31.6
Labor	William Carmody	2,736	35.0	+2.0
Total formal votes		7,828	98.6	+1.1
Informal votes		107	1.4	−1.1
Turnout		7,935	87.7	−4.1
Liberal hold		Swing	N/A	

1943 Western Australian state election: Claremont
Party	Candidate	Votes	%	±%
Nationalist	Eric Gillett	2,409	33.6	+33.6
Nationalist	Charles North	2,398	33.4	−66.6
Labor	John Vivian	2,372	33.0	+33.0
Total formal votes		7,179	97.5	
Informal votes		182	2.5	
Turnout		7,361	91.8	
Two-candidate-preferred result
Nationalist	Charles North	4,062	56.6	−43.4
Nationalist	Eric Gillett	3,117	43.4	+43.4
Nationalist hold		Swing	N/A	

=== Elections in the 1930s ===
1939 Western Australian state election: Claremont
Party	Candidate	Votes	%	±%
Nationalist	Charles North	unopposed		
Nationalist hold		Swing		

1936 Western Australian state election: Claremont
Party	Candidate	Votes	%	±%
Nationalist	Charles North	2,118	51.0	+8.5
Nationalist	Donald Cleland	2,039	49.0	+19.6
Total formal votes		4,157	98.6	+2.9
Informal votes		59	1.4	−2.9
Turnout		4,216	63.6	−28.0
Nationalist hold		Swing	N/A	

1933 Western Australian state election: Claremont
Party	Candidate	Votes	%	±%
Nationalist	Charles North	2,448	42.5	−17.4
Nationalist	Donald Cleland	1,697	29.4	+29.4
Nationalist	Clarence Briggs	1,619	28.1	+28.1
Total formal votes		5,764	95.7	−3.5
Informal votes		258	4.3	+3.5
Turnout		6,022	91.6	+31.4
Two-candidate-preferred result
Nationalist	Charles North	3,071	53.3	
Nationalist	Donald Cleland	2,693	46.7	
Nationalist hold		Swing	N/A	

1930 Western Australian state election: Claremont
Party	Candidate	Votes	%	±%
Nationalist	Charles North	2,309	59.9	
Independent	Ada Bromham	1,548	40.1	
Total formal votes		3,857	99.2	
Informal votes		31	0.8	
Turnout		3,888	60.2	
Nationalist hold		Swing		

=== Elections in the 1920s ===
1927 Western Australian state election: Claremont
Party	Candidate	Votes	%	±%
Nationalist	Charles North	4,029	57.0	+23.1
Labor	Theodore Morgan	3,036	43.0	+6.4
Total formal votes		7,065	99.3	+0.7
Informal votes		50	0.7	−0.7
Turnout		7,115	66.3	−1.7
Nationalist hold		Swing	−1.8	

1924 Western Australian state election: Claremont
Party	Candidate	Votes	%	±%
Labor	George Dennis	2,086	36.6	+15.0
Nationalist	Charles North	1,933	33.9	+3.8
Ind. Nationalist	John Thomson	1,686	29.5	+29.5
Total formal votes		5,705	98.6	+0.6
Informal votes		78	1.4	−0.6
Turnout		5,783	68.0	−10.4
Two-party-preferred result
Nationalist	Charles North	3,356	58.8	+2.4
Labor	George Dennis	2,349	41.2	−2.4
Nationalist hold		Swing	+2.4	

1921 Western Australian state election: Claremont
Party	Candidate	Votes	%	±%
Nationalist	John Thomson	1,662	30.1	−5.5
Independent	Ada Bromham	1,289	23.3	+23.3
Labor	George Dennis	1,191	21.6	+21.6
Nationalist	Karl Drake-Brockman	721	13.0	+13.0
Nationalist	William Montgomery	332	6.0	+6.0
Nationalist	William Rolfe	332	6.0	+6.0
Total formal votes		5,527	98.0	−0.2
Informal votes		111	2.0	+0.2
Turnout		5,638	78.4	+15.2
Two-candidate-preferred result
Nationalist	John Thomson	3,120	56.4	
Independent	Ada Bromham	2,407	43.6	
Nationalist hold		Swing	N/A	

=== Elections in the 1910s ===
1918 Claremont state by-election
Party	Candidate	Votes	%	±%
Nationalist	Thomas Duff	1,279	37.5	
Independent	Joseph Langsford	852	25.0	
Independent	George Stevens	796	23.3	
Independent	Percy Brunton	253	7.4	
Independent	Harold Tuckfield	230	6.7	
Total formal votes		3,410	96.8	−1.3
Informal votes		113	3.2	+1.3
Turnout		3,523	53.6	−9.6
Two-candidate-preferred result
Nationalist	Thomas Duff	1,852	54.3	
Independent	Joseph Langsford	1,558	45.7	
Nationalist hold		Swing	N/A	

1917 Western Australian state election: Claremont
Party	Candidate	Votes	%	±%
Nationalist	Samuel MacAulay	1,471	36.6	+36.6
Nationalist	John Stewart	1,431	35.6	+35.6
Nationalist	George Stevens	678	16.9	+16.9
Nationalist	Thomas Briggs	444	11.0	+11.0
Total formal votes		4,024	98.1	–1.5
Informal votes		74	1.8	+1.5
Turnout		4,098	63.2	+8.0
Two-candidate-preferred result
Nationalist	John Stewart	2,013	50.0	+50.0
Nationalist	Samuel MacAulay	2,011	50.0	+50.0
Nationalist hold		Swing	N/A	

1914 Western Australian state election: Claremont
Party	Candidate	Votes	%	±%
Liberal	Evan Wisdom	2,261	57.0	+28.4
Liberal	Joseph Langsford	1,705	43.0	+16.5
Total formal votes		3,966	99.6	+0.3
Informal votes		15	0.4	−0.3
Turnout		3,981	55.2	−28.3
Liberal hold		Swing	N/A	

1911 Western Australian state election: Claremont
Party	Candidate	Votes	%	±%
Labor	Reginald Burchell	1,648	44.9	
Ministerialist	Evan Wisdom	1,050	28.6	
Ministerialist	Joseph Langsford	975	26.5	
Total formal votes		3,673	99.3	
Informal votes		24	0.7	
Turnout		3,697	83.5	
Two-party-preferred result
Ministerialist	Evan Wisdom	1,867	50.8	
Labor	Reginald Burchell	1,806	49.2	
Ministerialist hold		Swing		

=== Elections in the 1900s ===
1908 Western Australian state election: Claremont
Party	Candidate	Votes	%	±%
Ministerialist	John Foulkes	1,427	49.4	−21.9
Ministerialist	Thomas Briggs	825	28.6	+28.6
Ministerialist	John Stuart	636	22.0	+22.0
Total formal votes		2,888	99.4	+0.1
Informal votes		17	0.6	−0.1
Turnout		2,905	74.2	+28.6
Ministerialist hold		Swing	N/A	

1905 Western Australian state election: Claremont
Party	Candidate	Votes	%	±%
Ministerialist	John Foulkes	1,064	71.3	–11.1
Ministerialist	James Weir	428	28.7	+28.7
Total formal votes		1,492	99.3	+2.0
Informal votes		10	0.7	–2.0
Turnout		1,502	45.6	–13.9
Ministerialist hold		Swing	N/A	

1904 Western Australian state election: Claremont
Party	Candidate	Votes	%	±%
Ministerialist	John Foulkes	1,553	82.4	+41.0
Labour	Walter Abbott	331	17.6	+17.6
Total formal votes		1,884	97.3	–1.4
Informal votes		53	2.7	+1.4
Turnout		1,937	59.5	+8.7
Ministerialist hold		Swing	N/A	

1902 Claremont state by-election
Party	Candidate	Votes	%	±%
Opposition	John Foulkes	634	41.4	+41.4
Ministerialist	Frank Wilson	318	20.8	+20.8
Opposition	Joseph Langsford	297	19.4	–15.0
Opposition	Richard Pennefather	182	11.9	+11.9
Ministerialist	George Temple-Poole	99	6.5	+6.5
Total formal votes		1,530	98.7	–0.5
Informal votes		20	1.3	+0.5
Turnout		1,550	50.8	–2.1
Opposition hold		Swing	N/A	

1901 Western Australian state election: Claremont
Party	Candidate	Votes	%	±%
Ministerialist	William Sayer	551	38.1	+38.1
Opposition	Joseph Langsford	497	34.4	+34.4
Opposition	Andrew Henning	397	27.5	+27.5
Total formal votes		1,445	99.2	n/a
Informal votes		11	0.8	n/a
Turnout		1,456	52.9	n/a
Ministerialist win		(new seat)		
