= Results of the 1921 Western Australian state election (Legislative Assembly) =

Western Australian state election, 12 March 1921 Legislative Assembly << 1917–1924 >>
Enrolled voters	146,948^{[1]}				
Votes cast	98,958		Turnout	67.34%	+5.19%
Informal votes	1,620		Informal	1.64%	–0.05%
Summary of votes by party
Party	Primary votes	%	Swing	Seats	Change
Labor	35,829	36.81%	+11.99%	17	+ 2
Nationalist	26,995	27.73%	+6.68%	10	+ 2
Country	17,311	17.78%	–1.28%	16	+ 4
National Labor	9,809	10.08%	–6.77%	4	– 2
Independent	7,394	7.60%	+1.86%	3	+ 2
Total	97,338			50	

This is a list of electoral district results of the 1921 Western Australian election.

== Results by electoral district ==
=== Albany ===
1921 Western Australian state election: Albany
Party	Candidate	Votes	%	±%
Country	John Scaddan	1,529	57.1	+57.1
Labor	Arthur Wansbrough	1,149	42.9	+4.6
Total formal votes		2,678	99.2	−0.1
Informal votes		21	0.8	+0.1
Turnout		2,699	66.2	−5.2
Country gain from Nationalist		Swing	N/A	

=== Avon ===
1921 Western Australian state election: Avon
Party	Candidate	Votes	%	±%
Country	Tom Harrison	1,028	49.5	+14.2
Labor	Steven Donovan	943	45.5	+7.8
Independent Country	Alma McCorry	104	5.0	+5.0
Total formal votes		2,075	98.1	+1.1
Informal votes		40	1.9	−1.1
Turnout		2,115	56.7	−1.4
Two-party-preferred result
Country	Tom Harrison	1,093	52.7	−2.3
Labor	Steven Donovan	982	47.3	+2.3
Country hold		Swing	−2.3	

=== Beverley ===
1921 Western Australian state election: Beverley
Party	Candidate	Votes	%	±%
Country	Frank Broun	unopposed		
Country hold		Swing		

=== Boulder ===
1921 Western Australian state election: Boulder
Party	Candidate	Votes	%	±%
Labor	Philip Collier	1,833	54.5	−3.9
National Labor	James Rogers	1,533	45.5	+3.9
Total formal votes		3,366	99.5	−0.1
Informal votes		16	0.5	+0.1
Turnout		3,382	84.4	+12.4
Labor hold		Swing	−3.9	

=== Brownhill-Ivanhoe ===
1921 Western Australian state election: Brownhill-Ivanhoe
Party	Candidate	Votes	%	±%
Labor	John Lutey	1,490	56.7	+4.1
National Labor	James Reed	1,140	43.3	−4.1
Total formal votes		2,630	99.3	−0.3
Informal votes		19	0.7	+0.3
Turnout		2,649	76.4	+1.7
Labor hold		Swing	+4.1	

=== Bunbury ===
1921 Western Australian state election: Bunbury
Party	Candidate	Votes	%	±%
Nationalist	Griffin Money	1,143	50.8	+17.4
Labor	Frederick Withers	1,108	49.2	+23.0
Total formal votes		2,251	99.5	+1.2
Informal votes		12	0.5	−1.2
Turnout		2,263	68.2	−8.1
Nationalist hold		Swing	N/A	

=== Canning ===
1921 Western Australian state election: Canning
Party	Candidate	Votes	%	±%
Labor	Alexander Clydesdale	3,213	47.9	+17.7
Nationalist	Robert Robinson	2,571	38.3	−31.5
Independent	Ada Butler	563	8.4	+8.4
Independent	Duncan Munro	364	5.4	+5.4
Total formal votes		6,711	98.0	−0.6
Informal votes		138	2.0	+0.6
Turnout		6,849	69.7	+17.1
Two-party-preferred result
Labor	Alexander Clydesdale	3,687	54.9	+24.7
Nationalist	Robert Robinson	3,024	45.1	−24.7
Labor gain from Nationalist		Swing	+24.7	

=== Claremont ===
1921 Western Australian state election: Claremont
Party	Candidate	Votes	%	±%
Nationalist	John Thomson	1,662	30.1	−5.5
Independent	Ada Bromham	1,289	23.3	+23.3
Labor	George Dennis	1,191	21.6	+21.6
Nationalist	Karl Drake-Brockman	721	13.0	+13.0
Nationalist	William Montgomery	332	6.0	+6.0
Nationalist	William Rolfe	332	6.0	+6.0
Total formal votes		5,527	98.0	−0.2
Informal votes		111	2.0	+0.2
Turnout		5,638	78.4	+15.2
Two-candidate-preferred result
Nationalist	John Thomson	3,120	56.4	
Independent	Ada Bromham	2,407	43.6	
Nationalist hold		Swing	N/A	

=== Collie ===
1921 Western Australian state election: Collie
Party	Candidate	Votes	%	±%
Labor	Arthur Wilson	unopposed		
Labor hold		Swing		

=== Coolgardie ===
1921 Western Australian state election: Coolgardie
Party	Candidate	Votes	%	±%
Labor	George Lambert	565	60.8	+6.9
National Labor	Peter Wedd	222	23.9	−9.0
Independent	William Faahan	143	15.4	+15.4
Total formal votes		930	97.5	−0.5
Informal votes		24	2.5	+0.5
Turnout		954	66.3	−5.6
Labor hold		Swing	N/A	

- Preferences were not distributed.

=== Cue ===
1921 Western Australian state election: Cue
Party	Candidate	Votes	%	±%
Labor	Thomas Chesson	359	68.3	−31.7
Country	George Ellemor	167	31.7	+31.7
Total formal votes		526	100	
Informal votes		0	0	
Turnout		526	69.4	
Labor hold		Swing	N/A	

=== East Perth ===
1921 Western Australian state election: East Perth
Party	Candidate	Votes	%	±%
Labor	Jack Simons	2,182	47.8	+6.8
Nationalist	Charles Heppingstone	866	19.0	+3.0
National Labor	Thomas Ferguson	740	16.2	+3.7
Nationalist	John Hardwick	666	14.6	−5.3
Nationalist	William Henderson	112	2.4	+2.4
Total formal votes		4,566	98.0	+1.7
Informal votes		93	2.0	−1.7
Turnout		4,659	70.5	+10.6
Two-party-preferred result
Labor	Jack Simons	2,363	51.8	+3.2
Nationalist	Charles Heppingstone	2,203	48.2	−3.2
Labor gain from Nationalist		Swing	+3.2	

=== Forrest ===
1921 Western Australian state election: Forrest
Party	Candidate	Votes	%	±%
Labor	Peter O'Loghlen	unopposed		
Labor hold		Swing		

=== Fremantle ===
1921 Western Australian state election: Fremantle
Party	Candidate	Votes	%	±%
Labor	Walter Jones	1,399	45.1	−13.1
Nationalist	Frank Gibson	1,119	36.0	+36.0
Nationalist	Joseph Allen	586	18.9	+18.9
Total formal votes		3,104	97.2	−2.5
Informal votes		88	2.8	+2.5
Turnout		3,192	76.6	+11.6
Two-party-preferred result
Nationalist	Frank Gibson	1,667	53.7	+53.7
Labor	Walter Jones	1,437	46.3	−11.9
Nationalist gain from Labor		Swing	N/A	

=== Gascoyne ===
1921 Western Australian state election: Gascoyne
Party	Candidate	Votes	%	±%
Country	Edward Angelo	412	60.7	+60.7
Labor	George Jones	180	26.5	+26.5
Independent	Edmund Holden	87	12.8	+12.8
Total formal votes		679	99.0	−1.0
Informal votes		7	1.0	+1.0
Turnout		686	60.9	+7.6
Country gain from Nationalist		Swing	N/A	

=== Geraldton ===
1921 Western Australian state election: Geraldton
Party	Candidate	Votes	%	±%
Labor	John Willcock	1,265	66.1	+18.5
Country	Ebenezer Bartlett	648	33.9	+33.9
Total formal votes		1,913	99.2	+1.3
Informal votes		15	0.8	−1.3
Turnout		1,928	80.0	+4.3
Labor hold		Swing	+15.3	

=== Greenough ===
1921 Western Australian state election: Greenough
Party	Candidate	Votes	%	±%
Country	Henry Maley	968	61.9	+38.4
Labor	Patrick Moy	595	38.1	+4.3
Total formal votes		1,563	99.4	+2.6
Informal votes		10	0.6	−2.6
Turnout		1,573	69.4	+8.3
Country hold		Swing	+4.1	

=== Guildford ===
1921 Western Australian state election: Guildford
Party	Candidate	Votes	%	±%
National Labor	Joseph Davies	2,621	49.2	+17.3
Labor	William Johnson	2,454	46.0	+2.9
National Labor	Henry Berry	256	4.8	+4.8
Total formal votes		5,331	98.2	+0.3
Informal votes		98	1.8	−0.3
Turnout		5,429	69.9	+4.1
Two-candidate-preferred result
National Labor	Joseph Davies	2,819	52.9	−2.5
Labor	William Johnson	2,512	47.1	+2.5
National Labor hold		Swing	−2.5	

=== Hannans ===
1921 Western Australian state election: Hannans
Party	Candidate	Votes	%	±%
Labor	Selby Munsie	792	67.0	+7.2
National Labor	Walter Openshaw	390	33.0	−3.3
Total formal votes		1,182	99.1	+1.4
Informal votes		11	0.9	−1.4
Turnout		1,193	73.2	+5.3
Labor hold		Swing	N/A	

=== Irwin ===
1921 Western Australian state election: Irwin
Party	Candidate	Votes	%	±%
Country	Charles Maley	304	28.3	−71.7
Country	William Mitchell	296	27.6	+27.6
Country	Henry Carson	143	13.3	+13.3
Country	Frederick Gill	116	10.8	+10.8
Independent	William Clarke	80	7.5	+7.5
Country	Edward Lang	74	6.9	+6.9
Country	Henry Carr	60	5.6	+5.6
Total formal votes		1,073	96.4	
Informal votes		40	3.6	
Turnout		1,113	47.7	
Two-candidate-preferred result
Country	Charles Maley	571	53.2	−46.8
Country	William Mitchell	502	46.8	+46.8
Country hold		Swing	N/A	

=== Kalgoorlie ===
1921 Western Australian state election: Kalgoorlie
Party	Candidate	Votes	%	±%
Labor	Albert Green	1,597	46.2	−4.3
Ind. Nationalist	John Boyland	1,268	36.7	+36.7
Nationalist	Charles Cutbush	423	12.2	+12.2
National Labor	Walter Close	169	4.9	+4.9
Total formal votes		3,457	99.3	+0.8
Informal votes		25	0.7	−0.8
Turnout		3,482	75.7	+9.1
Two-candidate-preferred result
Ind. Nationalist	John Boyland	1,831	53.0	
Labor	Albert Green	1,626	47.0	
Ind. Nationalist gain from Labor		Swing	N/A	

=== Kanowna ===
1921 Western Australian state election: Kanowna
Party	Candidate	Votes	%	±%
Labor	Thomas Walker	470	63.3	+5.2
Nationalist	Frederick Campbell	273	36.7	+30.1
Total formal votes		743	99.7	+2.6
Informal votes		2	0.3	−2.6
Turnout		745	60.0	+6.6
Labor hold		Swing	N/A	

=== Katanning ===
1921 Western Australian state election: Katanning
Party	Candidate	Votes	%	±%
Country	Alec Thomson	1,258	74.6	+8.3
Labor	Washington Mather	428	25.4	+25.4
Total formal votes		1,686	99.6	+1.9
Informal votes		6	0.6	−1.9
Turnout		1,692	55.0	−7.0
Country hold		Swing	N/A	

=== Kimberley ===
1921 Western Australian state election: Kimberley
Party	Candidate	Votes	%	±%
Country	Michael Durack	378	51.0	−21.5
Labor	Charles Cornish	247	33.3	+15.1
Independent	William Willesee	116	15.7	+15.7
Total formal votes		741	99.3	+2.1
Informal votes		5	0.7	−2.1
Turnout		746	65.2	+12.9
Country gain from Nationalist		Swing	N/A	

=== Leederville ===
1921 Western Australian state election: Leederville
Party	Candidate	Votes	%	±%
Labor	Harry Millington	1,995	36.7	+36.7
Nationalist	Lionel Carter	1,415	26.0	−29.2
Nationalist	Fred Gulley	1,165	21.4	+21.4
Nationalist	John Selby	470	8.6	+8.6
National Labor	John Slocombe	198	3.6	+3.6
Independent Labor	Herman Lehmann	193	3.6	+3.6
Total formal votes		5,436	97.2	−1.9
Informal votes		156	2.8	+1.9
Turnout		5,592	62.3	+12.4
Two-party-preferred result
Nationalist	Lionel Carter	3,092	56.9	+1.7
Labor	Harry Millington	2,344	43.1	+43.1
Nationalist hold		Swing	N/A	

=== Menzies ===
1921 Western Australian state election: Menzies
Party	Candidate	Votes	%	±%
National Labor	John Mullany	298	52.0	−10.4
Labor	Edward Gaynor	275	48.0	+10.4
Total formal votes		573	99.0	+0.1
Informal votes		6	1.0	−0.1
Turnout		579	79.4	+2.9
National Labor hold		Swing	−10.4	

=== Moore ===
1921 Western Australian state election: Moore
Party	Candidate	Votes	%	±%
Country	James Denton	561	46.9	+46.9
Country	Henry Lefroy	376	31.4	−68.6
Country	Victor Spencer	260	21.7	+21.7
Total formal votes		1,197	97.3	
Informal votes		33	2.7	
Turnout		1,230	45.9	
Two-candidate-preferred result
Country	James Denton	707	59.1	+59.1
Country	Henry Lefroy	490	40.9	−59.1
Country gain from Nationalist		Swing	N/A	

=== Mount Leonora ===
1921 Western Australian state election: Mount Leonora
Party	Candidate	Votes	%	±%
Labor	Thomas Heron	465	57.9	+19.4
National Labor	Sydney Fowler	338	42.1	−19.4
Total formal votes		803	99.4	−0.3
Informal votes		5	0.6	+0.3
Turnout		808	79.2	−4.7
Labor gain from National Labor		Swing	+19.4	

=== Mount Magnet ===
1921 Western Australian state election: Mount Magnet
Party	Candidate	Votes	%	±%
Labor	Michael Troy	710	80.1	−19.9
Nationalist	William Woodgate	114	12.8	+12.8
Country	Louis Dewar	63	7.1	+7.1
Total formal votes		887	98.7	
Informal votes		12	1.3	
Turnout		899	72.4	
Labor hold		Swing	N/A	

- Preferences were not distributed.

=== Mount Margaret ===
1921 Western Australian state election: Mount Margaret
Party	Candidate	Votes	%	±%
National Labor	George Taylor	unopposed		
National Labor hold		Swing		

=== Murchison ===
1921 Western Australian state election: Murchison
Party	Candidate	Votes	%	±%
Labor	William Marshall	455	55.2	−8.7
Nationalist	Joseph Bryant	198	24.0	+24.0
Country	James Chesson	171	20.7	+20.7
Total formal votes		824	97.7	−1.6
Informal votes		19	2.3	+1.6
Turnout		843	73.0	+14.7
Labor hold		Swing	N/A	

- Preferences were not distributed.

=== Murray-Wellington ===
1921 Western Australian state election: Murray-Wellington
Party	Candidate	Votes	%	±%
Nationalist	William George	881	56.3	−3.7
Country	James Paterson	380	24.3	−15.7
Independent	Caleb Joyce	303	19.4	+19.4
Total formal votes		1,564	98.4	−1.1
Informal votes		26	1.6	+1.1
Turnout		1,590	60.0	−5.3
Nationalist hold		Swing	N/A	

- Preferences were not distributed.

=== Nelson ===
1921 Western Australian state election: Nelson
Party	Candidate	Votes	%	±%
Country	Francis Willmott	823	40.7	−12.4
Independent Country	John Smith	709	35.1	−11.8
Labor	Thomas Ryan	488	24.2	+24.2
Total formal votes		2,020	97.8	−1.7
Informal votes		45	2.2	+1.7
Turnout		2,065	63.1	−1.6
Two-candidate-preferred result
Independent Country	John Smith	1,130	55.9	+9.0
Country	Francis Willmott	890	44.1	−9.0
Independent Country gain from Country		Swing	N/A	

=== North Perth ===
1921 Western Australian state election: North Perth
Party	Candidate	Votes	%	±%
Nationalist	James Smith	2,349	57.5	−3.7
Labor	Ted Needham	1,734	42.5	+42.5
Total formal votes		4,083	98.6	+0.7
Informal votes		56	1.4	−0.7
Turnout		4,139	64.0	+15.5
Nationalist hold		Swing	N/A	

=== North-East Fremantle ===
1921 Western Australian state election: North-East Fremantle
Party	Candidate	Votes	%	±%
Labor	William Angwin	unopposed		
Labor hold		Swing		

=== Northam ===
1921 Western Australian state election: Northam
Party	Candidate	Votes	%	±%
Nationalist	James Mitchell	1,051	58.1	−41.9
Labor	Louis Grieve	758	41.9	+41.9
Total formal votes		1,809	99.2	
Informal votes		14	0.8	
Turnout		1,823	73.2	
Nationalist hold		Swing	N/A	

=== Perth ===
1921 Western Australian state election: Perth
Party	Candidate	Votes	%	±%
Nationalist	Harry Mann	1,356	49.7	−6.9
Labor	Herbert Swan	805	29.5	−3.6
Independent	Percy Brunton	293	10.7	+10.7
Independent	Thomas Molloy	273	10.0	+10.0
Total formal votes		2,727	97.1	+0.5
Informal votes		82	2.9	−0.5
Turnout		2,809	62.9	+8.5
After distribution of preferences
Nationalist	Harry Mann	1,504	55.1	
Labor	Herbert Swan	872	32.0	
Independent	Percy Brunton	351	12.9	
Nationalist hold		Swing	N/A	

=== Pilbara ===
1921 Western Australian state election: Pilbara
Party	Candidate	Votes	%	±%
Independent	Henry Underwood	241	64.4	−35.6
Labor	Arthur Edwards	133	35.6	+35.6
Total formal votes		374	98.7	
Informal votes		5	98.7	
Turnout		379	58.1	
Independent gain from National Labor		Swing	N/A	

=== Pingelly ===
1921 Western Australian state election: Pingelly
Party	Candidate	Votes	%	±%
Country	Henry Hickmott	816	69.0	−35.7
Country	Harrie Seward	207	17.5	+17.5
Country	Harry Gayfer	159	13.4	+13.4
Total formal votes		1,182	98.2	+1.8
Informal votes		22	1.8	−1.8
Turnout		1,204	52.7	−9.1
Country hold		Swing	N/A	

- Preferences were not distributed.

=== Roebourne ===
1921 Western Australian state election: Roebourne
Party	Candidate	Votes	%	±%
Nationalist	Frederick Teesdale	246	74.8	−3.1
Labor	Thomas Daley	47	14.3	−7.8
Independent	Richard Hancock	36	10.9	+10.9
Total formal votes		329	98.5	−1.2
Informal votes		5	1.5	+1.2
Turnout		334	57.6	+8.9
Nationalist hold		Swing	N/A	

- Preferences were not distributed.

=== South Fremantle ===
1921 Western Australian state election: South Fremantle
Party	Candidate	Votes	%	±%
Labor	Alick McCallum	1,741	48.3	+48.3
Nationalist	William Watson	1,531	42.5	+42.5
Independent Labor	Samuel Rocke	332	9.2	–40.9
Total formal votes		3,604	97.9	–0.6
Informal votes		78	2.1	+0.6
Turnout		3,682	78.9	+13.6
Two-party-preferred result
Labor	Alick McCallum	1,849	51.3	+51.3
Nationalist	William Watson	1,755	48.7	+48.7
Labor gain from Independent Labor		Swing	N/A	

=== Subiaco ===
1921 Western Australian state election: Subiaco
Party	Candidate	Votes	%	±%
National Labor	Walter Richardson	2,020	41.0	+41.0
Labor	Arthur Ramsbottom	1,686	34.2	−65.8
Nationalist	Samuel Brown	1,218	24.7	+24.7
Total formal votes		4,924	98.5	
Informal votes		73	1.5	
Turnout		4,997	63.8	
Two-party-preferred result
National Labor	Walter Richardson	2,985	60.6	+60.6
Labor	Arthur Ramsbottom	1,939	39.4	−60.6
National Labor gain from Labor		Swing	N/A	

=== Sussex ===
1921 Western Australian state election: Sussex
Party	Candidate	Votes	%	±%
Country	William Pickering	572	39.9	−10.3
Nationalist	George William Barnard	350	24.4	−25.4
Country	Benjamin Prowse	222	15.5	+15.5
Country	Arthur Heppingstone	152	10.6	+10.6
Nationalist	Valentine Mitchell	113	7.9	+7.9
Independent	Walter Finlayson	26	1.8	+1.8
Total formal votes		1,435	98.1	−1.2
Informal votes		27	1.9	+1.2
Turnout		1,462	78.4	+9.3
Two-candidate-preferred result
Country	William Pickering	798	55.6	+5.4
Nationalist	George Barnard	637	44.4	−5.4
Country hold		Swing	+5.4	

=== Swan ===
1921 Western Australian state election: Swan
Party	Candidate	Votes	%	±%
Country	Richard Sampson	725	30.3	+30.3
Labor	John Holman	719	30.0	+30.0
Nationalist	Caryl Molyneux	301	12.6	−34.0
Country	George Wilson	268	11.2	+11.2
Independent	Miss. Nell Dungey	327	3.7	+3.7
Nationalist	Fred Serisier	53	2.2	+2.2
Total formal votes		2,393	97.7	−1.8
Informal votes		56	2.3	+1.8
Turnout		2,449	67.7	+9.7
Two-party-preferred result
Country	Richard Sampson	1,409	58.9	+58.9
Labor	John Holman	984	41.1	+41.1
Country gain from Nationalist		Swing	N/A	

=== Toodyay ===
1921 Western Australian state election: Toodyay
Party	Candidate	Votes	%	±%
Country	Alfred Piesse	959	59.7	+18.6
Independent Country	Henry Clarkson	647	40.3	+27.6
Total formal votes		1,606	97.7	0.0
Informal votes		37	2.3	0.0
Turnout		1,643	50.4	+5.2
Country hold		Swing	+0.9	

=== Wagin ===
1921 Western Australian state election: Wagin
Party	Candidate	Votes	%	±%
Country	Sydney Stubbs	990	67.6	+16.0
Country	John Gettingby	474	32.4	+32.4
Informal votes		1,464	99.5	+0.5
Informal votes		7	0.5	−0.5
Turnout		1,471	58.1	−11.8
Country hold		Swing	N/A	

=== West Perth ===
1921 Western Australian state election: West Perth
Party	Candidate	Votes	%	±%
Nationalist	Edith Cowan	1,164	38.3	+38.3
Nationalist	Thomas Draper	1,109	36.5	−16.8
Nationalist	Ebenezer Allen	767	25.2	+25.2
Total formal votes		3,040	98.5	+3.1
Informal votes		45	1.5	−3.1
Turnout		3,085	69.3	+8.0
Two-candidate-preferred result
Nationalist	Edith Cowan	1,543	50.8	
Nationalist	Thomas Draper	1,497	49.2	
Nationalist hold		Swing	N/A	

=== Williams-Narrogin ===
1921 Western Australian state election: Williams-Narrogin
Party	Candidate	Votes	%	±%
Country	Edward Johnston	unopposed		
Country hold		Swing		

=== Yilgarn ===
1921 Western Australian state election: Yilgarn
Party	Candidate	Votes	%	±%
Labor	Edwin Corboy	358	48.0	+9.6
National Labor	Charles Hudson	222	29.8	−4.5
Country	Maurice Solomon	166	22.2	+22.2
Total formal votes		746	97.1	−1.5
Informal votes		22	2.9	+1.5
Turnout		768	72.1	−1.4
Two-candidate-preferred result
Labor	Edwin Corboy	397	53.2	+9.5
National Labor	Charles Hudson	349	46.8	−9.5
Labor gain from National Labor		Swing	+9.5	

=== York ===
1921 Western Australian state election: York
Party	Candidate	Votes	%	±%
Country	Charles Latham	859	54.2	−1.8
Country	William Burges	727	45.8	+45.8
Total formal votes		1,586	99.5	+0.1
Informal votes		8	0.5	−0.1
Turnout		1,594	57.1	+3.4
Country hold		Swing	N/A	

== See also ==
- 1921 Western Australian state election
- Candidates of the 1921 Western Australian state election
- Members of the Western Australian Legislative Assembly, 1921–1924
