= Candidates of the 1921 Western Australian state election =

The 1921 Western Australian state election was held on 12 March 1921.

== Retiring Members ==
=== Nationalist ===
- Thomas Duff (MLA) Claremont
- John Veryard (MLA) Leederville
- Robert Pilkington (MLA) Perth
- William Nairn (MLA) Swan

=== Country ===
- James Gardiner (MLA) Irwin
- Harry Griffiths (MLA) York

== Legislative Assembly ==
Sitting members are shown in bold text. Successful candidates are highlighted in the relevant colour. Where there is possible confusion, an asterisk (*) is also used.

Electorate	Held by	Labor candidate	Nationalist candidate	Country candidate	National Labor candidate	Other candidates
Albany	Country	Arthur Wansbrough		**John Scaddan**		
Avon	Country	Steven Donovan		**Tom Harrison**		Alma McCorry (Ind. Country)
Beverley	Country			**Frank Broun**		
Boulder	Labor	**Philip Collier**			James Rogers	
Brown Hill-Ivanhoe	Labor	**John Lutey**			James Reed	
Bunbury	Nationalist	Frederick Withers	**Griffin Money**			
Canning	Nationalist	Alexander Clydesdale	**Robert Robinson**			Ada Butler (Independent); Duncan Munro (Independent)
Claremont	Nationalist	George Dennis	John Thomson*; Karl Drake-Brockman; William Montgomery; William Rolfe			Ada Bromham (Independent)
Collie	Labor	**Arthur Wilson**				
Coolgardie	Labor	**George Lambert**			Peter Wedd	William Faahan (Independent)
Cue	Labor	**Thomas Chesson**		George Ellemor		
East Perth	Nationalist	Jack Simons	Charles Heppingstone; **John Hardwick**; William Henderson		Thomas Ferguson	
Forrest	Labor	**Peter O'Loghlen**				
Fremantle	Labor	**Walter Jones**	Frank Gibson*; Joseph Allen			
Gascoyne	Country	George Jones		**Edward Angelo**		Edmund Holden (Independent)
Geraldton	Labor	**John Willcock**		Ebenezer Bartlett		
Greenough	Country	Patrick Moy		**Henry Maley**		
Guildford	National Labor	William Johnson			**Joseph Davies***; Henry Berry	
Hannans	Labor	**Selby Munsie**			Walter Openshaw	
Irwin	Country			Charles Maley*; William Mitchell; Henry Carson; Frederick Gill; Edward Lang; Henry Carr		William Clarke (Independent)
Kalgoorlie	Labor	**Albert Green**	Charles Cutbush		Walter Close	John Boyland (Ind. Nationalist)
Kanowna	Labor	**Thomas Walker**	Frederick Campbell			
Katanning	Country	Washington Mather		**Alec Thomson**		
Kimberley	Country	Charles Cornish		**Michael Durack**		William Willesee (Independent)
Leederville	Nationalist	Harry Millington	Lionel Carter*; Fred Gulley; John Selby		John Slocombe	Herman Lehmann (Ind. Labor)
Menzies	National Labor	Edward Gaynor			**John Mullany**	
Moore	Country			James Denton*; **Henry Lefroy**; Victor Spencer		
Mount Leonora	Labor	**Thomas Heron**			Sydney Fowler	
Mount Magnet	Labor	**Michael Troy**	William Woodgate	Louis Dewar		
Mount Margaret	National Labor				**George Taylor**	
Murchison	Labor	**William Marshall**	Joseph Bryant	James Chesson		
Murray-Wellington	Nationalist		**William George**	James Paterson		Caleb Joyce (Independent)
Nelson	Country	Thomas Ryan		**Francis Willmott**		John Smith (Ind. Country)
North Perth	Nationalist	Ted Needham	**James Smith**			
North-East Fremantle	Labor	**William Angwin**				
Northam	Nationalist	Louis Grieve	**James Mitchell**			
Perth	Nationalist	Herbert Swan	Harry Mann			Percy Brunton (Independent); Thomas Molloy (Independent)
Pilbara	Independent	Arthur Edwards				**Henry Underwood** (Independent)
Pingelly	Country			**Henry Hickmott***; Harrie Seward; Harry Gayfer		
Roebourne	Nationalist	Thomas Daley	**Frederick Teesdale**			Richard Hancock (Independent)
South Fremantle	Ind. Labor	Alick McCallum	William Watson			**Samuel Rocke** (Ind. Labor)
Subiaco	Nationalist	Arthur Ramsbottom	**Samuel Brown**		Walter Richardson	
Sussex	Country		George Barnard; Valentine Mitchell	**William Pickering***; Benjamin Prowse; Arthur Heppingstone		Walter Finlayson (Independent)
Swan	Nationalist	John Holman	Caryl Molyneux; Fred Serisier	Richard Sampson*; George Wilson		Nell Dungey (Independent)
Toodyay	Country			**Alfred Piesse**		Henry Clarkson (Ind. Country)
Wagin	Country			**Sydney Stubbs***; John Gettingby		
West Perth	Nationalist		Edith Cowan*; **Thomas Draper**; Eben Allen			
Williams-Narrogin	Country			**Bertie Johnston**		
Yilgarn	National Labor	Edwin Corboy		Maurice Solomon	**Charles Hudson**	
York	Country			Charles Latham*; William Burges		

== See also ==
- Members of the Western Australian Legislative Assembly, 1917–1921
- Members of the Western Australian Legislative Assembly, 1921–1924
- Results of the 1921 Western Australian state election (Legislative Assembly)
- 1921 Western Australian state election
