= Results of the 1917 Western Australian state election =

Western Australian state election, 29 September 1917 Legislative Assembly
Enrolled voters	138,115^{[1]}				
Votes cast	85,620		Turnout	61.99%	+4.67%
Informal votes	1,447		Informal	1.69%	+0.50%
Summary of votes by party
Party	Primary votes	%	Swing	Seats	Change
Labor	20,867	24.79%		15	+ 1
Nationalist	18,087	21.49%		8	+ 3
National Liberal	11,242	13.36%		8	– 3
Country	15,560	18.49%		12	+ 1
National Labor	13,186	15.67%		6	– 3
Independent Labor WA	2,490	2.96%		1	+ 1
Independent	2,709	3.22%		0	± 0
Total	84,173			50	

This is a list of the results of the 1917 state election in Western Australia, listed by electoral district.

== Results by electoral district ==
=== Albany ===
1917 Western Australian state election: Albany
Party	Candidate	Votes	%	±%
National Labor	John Scaddan	793	26.9	+26.9
Labor	Francis Knowles	760	25.8	–25.2
Nationalist	Herbert Robinson	722	24.5	+24.5
National Country	Ernest McKenzie	376	12.8	+12.8
National Country	Stephen Johnson	298	10.1	+10.1
Total formal votes		2,949	98.8	–0.5
Informal votes		35	1.2	+0.5
Turnout		2,984	73.7	+7.5
Two-party-preferred result
Nationalist	Herbert Robinson	1,645	55.8	+55.8
National Labor	John Scaddan	1,304	44.2	+44.2
Nationalist gain from Labor		Swing	+55.8	

=== Avon ===
1917 Western Australian state election: Avon
Party	Candidate	Votes	%	±%
Labor	Patrick Coffey	843	37.7	–8.0
National Country	Thomas Harrison	789	35.3	–19.0
Nationalist	Thomas Duff	314	14.1	+14.1
Country	William Carroll	288	12.9	+12.9
Total formal votes		2,234	97.0	–2.7
Informal votes		68	3.0	+2.7
Turnout		2,302	58.1	+0.3
Two-party-preferred result
National Country	Thomas Harrison	1,228	55.0	+0.7
Labor	Patrick Coffey	1,006	45.0	–0.7
National Country hold		Swing	+0.7	

- Harrison's designation at the 1914 election was simply "Country", rather than "National Country".

=== Beverley ===
1917 Western Australian state election: Beverley
Party	Candidate	Votes	%	±%
Nationalist	Frank Broun	548	56.7	+56.7
Country	Henry Stanistreet	418	43.3	–17.1
Total formal votes		966	99.7	+1.0
Informal votes		3	0.3	–1.0
Turnout		969	50.6	–6.3
Nationalist gain from Country		Swing	+56.7	

=== Boulder ===
1917 Western Australian state election: Boulder
Party	Candidate	Votes	%	±%
Labor	Philip Collier	2,013	58.4	–41.6
National Labor	James Reed	1,435	41.6	+41.6
Total formal votes		3,448	99.7	n/a
Informal votes		12	0.3	n/a
Turnout		3,460	72.0	n/a
Labor hold		Swing	–41.6	

- Collier won Boulder unopposed at the 1914 election.

=== Brownhill-Ivanhoe ===
1917 Western Australian state election: Brownhill-Ivanhoe
Party	Candidate	Votes	%	±%
Labor	John Lutey	1,788	52.6	–0.5
National Labor	John Boyland	1,613	47.4	+0.5
Total formal votes		3,401	99.6	–0.3
Informal votes		12	0.4	+0.3
Turnout		3,413	74.7	+2.7
Labor hold		Swing	–0.5	

=== Bunbury ===
1917 Western Australian state election: Bunbury
Party	Candidate	Votes	%	±%
National Labor	William Thomas	898	40.4	+40.4
Nationalist	Griffin Money	742	33.4	+33.4
Labor	Philip McKenna	583	26.2	–25.0
Total formal votes		2,223	98.3	–1.1
Informal votes		39	1.7	+1.1
Turnout		2,262	76.3	+8.3
Two-party-preferred result
Nationalist	Griffin Money	1,222	55.0	+55.0
National Labor	William Thomas	1,001	45.0	+45.0
Nationalist gain from National Labor		Swing	+0.7	

=== Canning ===
1917 Western Australian state election: Canning
Party	Candidate	Votes	%	±%
National Liberal	Robert Robinson	2,685	69.8	+16.0
Labor	Donald Cameron	1,161	30.2	–16.0
Total formal votes		3,846	98.6	–1.0
Informal votes		56	1.4	+1.0
Turnout		3,902	52.6	–26.9
National Liberal hold		Swing	+16.0	

=== Claremont ===
1917 Western Australian state election: Claremont
Party	Candidate	Votes	%	±%
Nationalist	Samuel MacAulay	1,471	36.6	+36.6
Nationalist	John Stewart	1,431	35.6	+35.6
Nationalist	George Stevens	678	16.9	+16.9
Nationalist	Thomas Briggs	444	11.0	+11.0
Total formal votes		4,024	98.1	–1.5
Informal votes		74	1.8	+1.5
Turnout		4,098	63.2	+8.0
Two-candidate-preferred result
Nationalist	John Stewart	2,013	50.0	+50.0
Nationalist	Samuel MacAulay	2,011	50.0	+50.0
Nationalist hold		Swing	N/A	

=== Collie ===
1917 Western Australian state election: Collie
Party	Candidate	Votes	%	±%
Labor	Arthur Wilson	unopposed		
Labor hold		Swing		

=== Coolgardie ===
1917 Western Australian state election: Coolgardie
Party	Candidate	Votes	%	±%
Labor	George Lambert	744	53.9	–46.1
National Labor	Albert Pascoe	455	33.0	+33.0
National Labor	Samuel Scotson	182	13.2	+13.2
Total formal votes		1,381	98.0	n/a
Informal votes		28	2.0	n/a
Turnout		1,409	71.9	n/a
Labor hold		Swing	–46.1	

- The previous Labor candidate, Charles McDowall, had been elected unopposed in 1914.

=== Cue ===
1917 Western Australian state election: Cue
Party	Candidate	Votes	%	±%
Labor	Thomas Chesson	unopposed		
Labor hold		Swing		

=== East Perth ===
1917 Western Australian state election: East Perth
Party	Candidate	Votes	%	±%
Labor	Jack Simons	1,435	41.0	–18.0
National Liberal	John Hardwick	696	19.9	+2.3
Nationalist	Alfred Sims	558	16.0	+16.0
National Labor	Thomas Dunne	438	12.5	+12.5
Democratic	John Powell	370	10.6	+10.6
Total formal votes		3,497	96.3	–1.8
Informal votes		135	3.7	+1.8
Turnout		3,632	59.9	+10.0
Two-party-preferred result
National Liberal	John Hardwick	1,796	51.4	–1.3
Labor	Jack Simons	1,701	48.6	+1.3
National Liberal hold		Swing	–1.3	

=== Forrest ===
1917 Western Australian state election: Forrest
Party	Candidate	Votes	%	±%
Labor	Peter O'Loghlen	unopposed		
Labor hold		Swing		

=== Fremantle ===
1917 Western Australian state election: Fremantle
Party	Candidate	Votes	%	±%
Labor	Walter Jones	1,654	58.2	+4.4
National Labor	William Carpenter	1,189	41.8	+41.8
Total formal votes		2,843	99.7	+2.4
Informal votes		9	0.3	–2.4
Turnout		2,852	65.0	+6.4
Labor gain from National Labor		Swing	N/A	

=== Gascoyne ===
1917 Western Australian state election: Gascoyne
Party	Candidate	Votes	%	±%
Nationalist	Edward Angelo	313	65.2	+65.2
National Liberal	Archibald Gilchrist	167	34.8	–24.9
Total formal votes		480	100.0	+0.4
Informal votes		0	0.0	–0.4
Turnout		480	53.3	–10.1
Nationalist gain from National Liberal		Swing	+65.2	

- Gilchrist's designation at the 1914 election was simply "Liberal", rather than "National Liberal".

=== Geraldton ===
1917 Western Australian state election: Geraldton
Party	Candidate	Votes	%	±%
Labor	John Willcock	904	47.6	–1.6
Nationalist	Samuel Elliott	596	31.4	–19.4
Nationalist	William Fallowfield	399	21.0	+21.0
Total formal votes		1,899	97.9	–1.1
Informal votes		40	2.1	+1.1
Turnout		1,939	75.7	n/a
Two-party-preferred result
Labor	John Willcock	965	50.8	+1.6
Nationalist	Samuel Elliott	934	49.2	–1.6
Labor gain from Nationalist		Swing	+1.6	

=== Greenough ===
1917 Western Australian state election: Greenough
Party	Candidate	Votes	%	±%
Labor	Patrick Moy	499	33.8	+33.8
National Country	John Cunningham	390	26.4	–50.6
National Country	Henry Maley	347	23.5	+23.5
Nationalist	Sydney Hosken	242	16.4	+16.4
Total formal votes		1,478	96.9	–1.9
Informal votes		48	3.1	+1.9
Turnout		1,526	61.1	+24.2
Two-party-preferred result
National Country	Henry Maley	854	57.8	+57.8
Labor	Patrick Moy	624	42.2	+42.2
National Country hold		Swing	N/A	

=== Guildford ===
1917 Western Australian state election: Guildford
Party	Candidate	Votes	%	±%
Labor	William Johnson	2,055	43.1	–26.4
National Labor	Joseph Davies	1,522	32.0	+32.0
Nationalist	George Hiscox	539	11.3	+11.3
Nationalist	William Crosbie	397	8.3	+8.3
Nationalist	Ernest Kerruish	251	5.3	+5.3
Total formal votes		4,764	97.9	–1.1
Informal votes		104	2.1	+1.1
Turnout		4,868	65.8	+11.0
Two-party-preferred result
National Labor	Joseph Davies	2,639	55.4	+55.4
Labor	William Johnson	2,125	44.6	–24.9
National Labor gain from Labor		Swing	+55.4	

=== Hannans ===
1917 Western Australian state election: Hannans
Party	Candidate	Votes	%	±%
Labor	Selby Munsie	856	59.8	–40.2
National Labor	Walter Close	520	36.3	+36.3
Nationalist	Richard Jordan	56	3.9	+3.9
Total formal votes		1,432	97.7	n/a
Informal votes		34	2.3	n/a
Turnout		1,466	67.9	n/a
Labor hold		Swing	–40.2	

=== Irwin ===
1917 Western Australian state election: Irwin
Party	Candidate	Votes	%	±%
National Country	James Gardiner	unopposed		
National Country hold		Swing		

=== Kalgoorlie ===
1917 Western Australian state election: Kalgoorlie
Party	Candidate	Votes	%	±%
Labor	Albert Green	1,902	50.5	–49.5
Nationalist	Charles Heppingstone	734	19.5	+19.5
National Labor	Harold Seddon	626	16.6	+16.6
Nationalist	Henry Davidson	501	13.3	+13.3
Total formal votes		3,763	98.5	n/a
Informal votes		59	1.5	n/a
Turnout		3,822	66.6	n/a
Labor hold		Swing	–49.5	

=== Kanowna ===
1917 Western Australian state election: Kanowna
Party	Candidate	Votes	%	±%
Labor	Thomas Walker	598	58.1	–41.9
National Labor	John Eastmon	363	35.3	+35.3
Nationalist	John Keegan	68	6.6	+6.6
Total formal votes		1,029	97.1	n/a
Informal votes		31	2.9	n/a
Turnout		1,060	53.4	n/a
Labor hold		Swing	–41.9	

=== Katanning ===
1917 Western Australian state election: Katanning
Party	Candidate	Votes	%	±%
National Country	Alec Thomson	1,383	66.3	+10.4
National Country	Alfred Fisher	518	24.8	+24.8
National Country	James Crawford	184	8.8	+8.8
Total formal votes		2,085	97.7	–2.2
Informal votes		49	2.3	+2.2
Turnout		2,134	62.0	+8.6
National Country hold		Swing	N/A	

=== Kimberley ===
1917 Western Australian state election: Kimberley
Party	Candidate	Votes	%	±%
Nationalist	Michael Durack	511	72.5	+72.5
Labor	James Maloney	128	18.2	+18.2
Independent Labor	John Cameron	35	5.0	+5.0
Nationalist	William Hollingsworth	31	4.4	+4.4
Total formal votes		705	97.2	n/a
Informal votes		20	2.8	n/a
Turnout		725	52.3	n/a
Nationalist hold		Swing	N/A	

=== Leederville ===
1917 Western Australian state election: Leederville
Party	Candidate	Votes	%	±%
National Liberal	John Veryard	2,129	55.2	+55.2
Nationalist	Sidney Gibson	1,726	44.8	+44.8
Total formal votes		3,855	99.1	+0.8
Informal votes		33	0.9	–0.8
Turnout		3,888	49.9	–7.1
National Liberal hold		Swing	N/A	

- Veryard's designation at the 1914 election was simply "Liberal", rather than "National Liberal".

=== Menzies ===
1917 Western Australian state election: Menzies
Party	Candidate	Votes	%	±%
National Labor	John Mullany	490	62.4	–6.8
Labor	Harold Saunders	295	37.6	+37.6
Total formal votes		785	98.9	–0.3
Informal votes		9	1.1	+0.3
Turnout		794	76.5	+11.6
National Labor hold		Swing	N/A	

- Mullany had run for Labor at the 1914 election.

=== Moore ===
1917 Western Australian state election: Moore
Party	Candidate	Votes	%	±%
National Liberal	Sir Henry Lefroy	unopposed		
National Liberal hold		Swing		

=== Mount Leonora ===
1917 Western Australian state election: Mount Leonora
Party	Candidate	Votes	%	±%
National Labor	George Foley	598	61.5	–38.5
Labor	Frederick Madden	375	38.5	+38.5
Total formal votes		973	99.7	n/a
Informal votes		3	0.3	n/a
Turnout		976	83.9	n/a
National Labor hold		Swing	N/A	

- Foley had run for Labor at the 1914 election, and was elected unopposed.

=== Mount Magnet ===
1917 Western Australian state election: Mount Magnet
Party	Candidate	Votes	%	±%
Labor	Frank Troy	unopposed		
Labor hold		Swing		

=== Mount Margaret ===
1917 Western Australian state election: Mount Margaret
Party	Candidate	Votes	%	±%
National Labor	George Taylor	513	63.3	–36.7
Labor	George McLeod	298	36.7	+36.7
Total formal votes		811	99.1	n/a
Informal votes		7	0.9	n/a
Turnout		818	75.2	n/a
National Labor hold		Swing	–36.7	

- Taylor had been elected unopposed at the 1914 election.

=== Murchison ===
1917 Western Australian state election: Murchison
Party	Candidate	Votes	%	±%
Labor	John Holman	562	63.9	–36.1
National Labor	William Spiers	318	36.1	+36.1
Total formal votes		880	99.3	n/a
Informal votes		6	0.7	n/a
Turnout		886	58.3	n/a
Labor hold		Swing	–36.1	

=== Murray-Wellington ===
1917 Western Australian state election: Murray-Wellington
Party	Candidate	Votes	%	±%
National Liberal	William George	931	60.0	–11.5
National Country	Kingsley Fairbridge	621	40.0	+40.0
Total formal votes		1,552	99.5	–0.1
Informal votes		7	0.5	+0.1
Turnout		1,559	65.3	+0.8
National Liberal hold		Swing	–11.5	

=== Nelson ===
1917 Western Australian state election: Nelson
Party	Candidate	Votes	%	±%
National Country	Francis Willmott	1,104	53.1	–1.1
Independent Labor	John Henry Smith	974	46.9	+46.9
Total formal votes		2,078	99.5	+0.1
Informal votes		10	0.5	–0.1
Turnout		2,088	64.7	–3.9
National Country hold		Swing	–1.1	

- Willmott's designation at the 1914 election was simply "Country", rather than "National Country".

=== Northam ===
1917 Western Australian state election: Northam
Party	Candidate	Votes	%	±%
National Liberal	James Mitchell	unopposed		
National Liberal hold		Swing		

=== North-East Fremantle ===
1917 Western Australian state election: North-East Fremantle
Party	Candidate	Votes	%	±%
Labor	William Angwin	unopposed		
Labor hold		Swing		

=== North Perth ===
1917 Western Australian state election: North Perth
Party	Candidate	Votes	%	±%
National Liberal	James MacCallum Smith	1,690	61.3	+22.3
Independent	Richard White	1,069	38.7	+38.7
Total formal votes		2,759	97.9	+2.0
Informal votes		58	2.1	–2.0
Turnout		2,817	48.5	–8.6
National Liberal hold		Swing	N/A	

- Smith's designation at the 1914 election was simply "Liberal", rather than "National Liberal".

=== Perth ===
1917 Western Australian state election: Perth
Party	Candidate	Votes	%	±%
Nationalist	Robert Pilkington	1,589	56.6	+7.8
Labor	Edmund Dunn	929	33.1	+33.1
Nationalist	Henry Mills	291	10.4	+10.4
Total formal votes		2,809	96.6	–0.9
Informal votes		99	3.4	+0.9
Turnout		2,908	54.4	+1.9
Nationalist hold		Swing	N/A	

=== Pilbara ===
1917 Western Australian state election: Pilbara
Party	Candidate	Votes	%	±%
National Labor	Henry Underwood	unopposed		
National Labor hold		Swing		

=== Pingelly ===
1917 Western Australian state election: Pingelly
Party	Candidate	Votes	%	±%
Nationalist	Richard Johnson	488	34.3	+34.3
National Country	Henry Hickmott	484	33.3	–24.2
National Country	Francis Wake	253	17.8	+17.8
National Country	William Martin	157	11.0	+11.0
National Country	Thomas James	52	3.7	+3.7
Total formal votes		1,424	96.4	–1.5
Informal votes		53	3.6	+1.5
Turnout		1,477	61.8	+4.6
Two-party-preferred result
National Country	Henry Hickmott	825	57.9	+0.4
Nationalist	Richard Johnson	599	42.1	+42.1
National Country hold		Swing	+0.4	

=== Roebourne ===
1917 Western Australian state election: Roebourne
Party	Candidate	Votes	%	±%
Nationalist	Frederick Teesdale	271	77.9	+77.9
Labor	John Haughey	77	22.1	–25.1
Total formal votes		348	99.7	+1.4
Informal votes		1	0.3	–1.4
Turnout		349	48.7	n/a
Nationalist hold		Swing	N/A	

=== South Fremantle ===
1917 Western Australian state election: South Fremantle
Party	Candidate	Votes	%	±%
Independent Labor	Samuel Rocke	1,481	50.1	+50.1
National Labor	Harry Bolton	1,475	49.9	–5.9
Total formal votes		2,956	98.5	–1.1
Informal votes		45	1.5	+1.1
Turnout		3,001	65.3	–0.3
Independent Labor gain from National Labor		Swing	+50.1	

=== Subiaco ===
1917 Western Australian state election: Subiaco
Party	Candidate	Votes	%	±%
Labor	Bartholomew Stubbs	unopposed		
Labor hold		Swing		

=== Sussex ===
1917 Western Australian state election: Sussex
Party	Candidate	Votes	%	±%
National Country	William Pickering	607	50.2	+34.0
National Liberal	Frank Wilson	603	49.8	+6.4
Total formal votes		1,210	99.3	+1.3
Informal votes		9	0.7	–1.3
Turnout		1,219	69.1	+2.5
National Country gain from National Liberal		Swing	N/A	

=== Swan ===
1917 Western Australian state election: Swan
Party	Candidate	Votes	%	±%
National Liberal	William Nairn	1,004	53.4	+12.3
Nationalist	Thomas Ilbery	876	46.6	+32.0
Total formal votes		1,880	99.5	+1.1
Informal votes		10	0.5	–1.1
Turnout		1,890	58.0	–9.5
National Liberal hold		Swing	–0.1	

- Nairn's designation at the 1914 election was simply "Liberal", rather than "National Liberal".

=== Toodyay ===
1917 Western Australian state election: Toodyay
Party	Candidate	Votes	%	±%
National Country	Alfred Piesse	747	41.1	–58.9
Country	Sinclair McGibbon	564	31.0	+31.0
Nationalist	Ivan Royal	277	15.2	+15.2
National Country	Henry Clarkson	231	12.7	+12.7
Total formal votes		1,819	97.7	n/a
Informal votes		43	2.3	n/a
Turnout		1,862	55.6	n/a
Two-party-preferred result
National Country	Alfred Piesse	1,070	58.8	–41.2
Country	Sinclair McGibbon	749	41.2	+41.2
National Country hold		Swing	–41.2	

- Piesse's designation at the 1914 election was simply "Country", rather than "National Country".

=== Wagin ===
1917 Western Australian state election: Wagin
Party	Candidate	Votes	%	±%
National Country	Sydney Stubbs	995	51.6	–1.5
National Country	Ernest Absolon	808	41.9	–5.1
National Country	Charles Keyser	125	6.5	+6.5
Total formal votes		1,928	99.0	–0.4
Informal votes		20	1.0	+0.4
Turnout		1,948	69.9	+3.3
National Country hold		Swing	N/A	

=== West Perth ===
1917 Western Australian state election: West Perth
Party	Candidate	Votes	%	±%
Nationalist	Thomas Draper	1,525	53.3	+53.3
National Liberal	Ebenezer Allen	1,159	40.5	–23.1
National Liberal	Joseph East	178	6.2	+6.2
Total formal votes		2,862	95.4	–4.3
Informal votes		139	4.6	+4.3
Turnout		3,001	61.3	+13.0
Nationalist hold		Swing	N/A	

=== Williams-Narrogin ===
1917 Western Australian state election: Williams-Narrogin
Party	Candidate	Votes	%	±%
National Country	Bertie Johnston	1,703	79.0	–21.0
National Country	William Rabbish	454	21.0	+21.0
Total formal votes		2,157	99.4	n/a
Informal votes		14	0.6	n/a
Turnout		2,171	61.1	n/a
National Country hold		Swing	–21.0	

=== Yilgarn ===
1917 Western Australian state election: Yilgarn
Party	Candidate	Votes	%	±%
Labor	Alick McCallum	430	38.4	+38.4
National Labor	Charles Hudson	384	34.3	–26.2
Nationalist	Archibald McIntyre	244	21.8	–17.6
Nationalist	John Dunstan	62	5.5	+5.5
Total formal votes		1,120	98.6	–0.4
Informal votes		16	1.4	+0.4
Turnout		1,136	73.5	+9.3
Two-party-preferred result
National Labor	Charles Hudson	631	56.3	–4.3
Labor	Alick McCallum	489	43.7	+43.7
National Labor hold		Swing	N/A	

=== York ===
1917 Western Australian state election: York
Party	Candidate	Votes	%	±%
National Country	Harry Griffiths	852	56.1	–1.5
National Country	Frederick Monger	668	43.9	+1.5
Total formal votes		1,520	99.4	–0.2
Informal votes		9	0.6	+0.2
Turnout		1,529	53.7	+3.4
National Country hold		Swing	–1.5	

== See also ==
- Members of the Western Australian Legislative Assembly, 1914–1917
- Members of the Western Australian Legislative Assembly, 1917–1921
