= Members of the Western Australian Legislative Assembly, 1917–1921 =

This is a list of members of the Western Australian Legislative Assembly between the 1917 election and the 1921 election, together known as the 10th Parliament.

Name	Party	District	Years in office
Edward Angelo	Nationalist/Country	Gascoyne	1917–1933
William Angwin	Labor	North-East Fremantle	1904–1905; 1906–1927
Frank Broun^{[6]}	Country	Beverley	1911–1914; 1917–1924
Samuel Brown^{[1]}	Nationalist	Subiaco	1917–1921
Thomas Chesson	Labor	Cue	1913–1930
Philip Collier	Labor	Boulder	1905–1948
Joseph Davies	National Labor	Guildford	1917–1924
Thomas Draper^{[5]}	Nationalist	West Perth	1907–1911; 1917–1921
Thomas Duff^{[2]}	Nationalist	Claremont	1918–1921
Michael Durack	Nationalist/Country	Kimberley	1917–1924
George Foley^{[7]}	National Labor	Mount Leonora	1911–1920
James Gardiner	Country	Irwin	1901–1904; 1914–1921
William James George	Nationalist	Murray-Wellington	1895–1902; 1909–1930
Albert Green	Labor	Kalgoorlie	1911–1913; 1914–1921
Harry Griffiths	Country	York	1914–1921; 1924–1935
John Hardwick	Nationalist	East Perth	1904–1911; 1914–1921
Tom Harrison	Country	Avon	1914–1924
Thomas Heron^{[7]}	Labor	Mount Leonora	1920–1928
Henry Hickmott	Country	Pingelly	1914–1924
John Holman	Labor	Murchison	1901–1921; 1923–1925
Charles Hudson	National Labor	Yilgarn	1905–1921
Edward Johnston	Country	Williams-Narrogin	1911–1928
Walter Jones	Labor	Fremantle	1917–1921
George Lambert	Labor	Coolgardie	1916–1930; 1933–1941
Hon Sir Henry Lefroy	Nationalist	Moore	1892–1901; 1911–1921
John Lutey	Labor	Brownhill-Ivanhoe	1916; 1917–1932
Henry Kennedy Maley	Country	Greenough	1917–1924; 1929–1930
Hon Sir James Mitchell^{[3]}	Nationalist	Northam	1905–1933
Griffin Money	Nationalist	Bunbury	1917–1924
John Mullany	National Labor	Menzies	1911–1924
Selby Munsie	Labor	Hannans	1911–1938
William Ralph Nairn	Nationalist	Swan	1914–1921
Peter O'Loghlen	Labor	Forrest	1908–1923
William Pickering	Country	Sussex	1917–1924
Alfred Piesse	Country	Toodyay	1911–1924
Robert Pilkington	Nationalist (Lib.)	Perth	1917–1921
Herbert Robinson^{[4]}	Nationalist	Albany	1917–1919
Robert Robinson	Nationalist	Canning	1914–1921
Samuel Rocke	Ind. Labor	South Fremantle	1917–1921
John Scaddan^{[4]}	National Labor/Country	Albany	1904–1917; 1919–1924; 1930–1933
James MacCallum Smith	Nationalist	North Perth	1914–1939
John Stewart^{[2]}	Nationalist	Claremont	1917–1918
Bartholomew James Stubbs^{[1]}	Labor	Subiaco	1911–1917
Sydney Stubbs	Country	Wagin	1911–1947
George Taylor	National Labor	Mount Margaret	1901–1930
Frederick Teesdale	Nationalist	Roebourne	1917–1931
Alec Thomson	Country	Katanning	1914–1930
Michael Troy	Labor	Mount Magnet	1904–1939
Henry Underwood	National Labor	Pilbara	1906–1924
John Veryard	Nationalist	Leederville	1905–1908; 1914–1921
Thomas Walker	Labor	Kanowna	1905–1932
John Willcock	Labor	Geraldton	1917–1947
Francis Willmott	Country	Nelson	1914–1921
Arthur Wilson	Labor	Collie	1908–1947

== Notes ==
^{1} The Labor member for Subiaco, Bartholomew James Stubbs, died in action in Belgium on 26 September 1917. At the resulting by-election on 10 November 1917, the Nationalist candidate, Samuel Brown, was successful.
^{2} The Nationalist member for Claremont, John Stewart, resigned on 30 August 1918. At the resulting by-election on 14 September 1918, the Nationalist candidate, Thomas Duff, was successful.
^{3} Sir James Mitchell, member for Northam, was appointed by Premier Hal Colebatch as Minister for Lands and Repatriation on 17 April 1919. Mitchell was therefore required to resign and contest a ministerial by-election, at which he was declared elected upon the close of nominations on 24 April 1919. He himself became premier three weeks later after the failure of the Colebatch Ministry.
^{4} The Nationalist member for Albany, Herbert Robinson, died on 2 May 1919. At the resulting by-election on 31 May 1919, the National Labor candidate, former Premier John Scaddan, was successful.
^{5} Thomas Draper, member for West Perth, was appointed by Premier James Mitchell as Attorney-General on 17 May 1919. Draper was therefore required to resign and contest a ministerial by-election, at which he was successful against an Independent candidate on 7 June 1919.
^{6} Frank Broun, member for Beverley, was appointed by Premier James Mitchell as Colonial Secretary on 25 June 1919. Broun was therefore required to resign and contest a ministerial by-election, at which he was returned unopposed at the close of nominations on 10 July 1919.
^{7} The National Labor member for Mount Leonora, George Foley, resigned on 18 November 1920, to run as the Nationalist candidate for the federal seat of Kalgoorlie at a by-election following the expulsion of Hugh Mahon from the Australian House of Representatives. At the resulting by-election on 20 December 1920, the Labor candidate, Thomas Heron, was successful.

== Sources ==
- Black, David; Prescott, Valerie (1997). Election statistics, Legislative Assembly of Western Australia, 1890-1996. Perth: Parliamentary History Project. ISBN 0-7309-8409-5.
- Hughes, Colin A.; Graham, B. D. (1976). Voting for the South Australian, Western Australian and Tasmanian Lower Houses, 1890-1964. Canberra: Australian National University. ISBN 0-7081-1334-6.
