= Electoral results for the district of Cue =

Western Australian district election results

This is a list of electoral results for the Electoral district of Cue in Western Australian state elections.

== Members for Cue ==
Member	Party	Term
Frederick Illingworth	Opposition	1901–1904
Edward Heitmann	Labor	1904–1913
Thomas Chesson	Labor	1913–1930

== Election results ==
=== Elections in the 1920s ===
1927 Western Australian state election: Cue
Party	Candidate	Votes	%	±%
Labor	Thomas Chesson	unopposed		
Labor hold		Swing		

1924 Western Australian state election: Cue
Party	Candidate	Votes	%	±%
Labor	Thomas Chesson	unopposed		
Labor hold		Swing		

1921 Western Australian state election: Cue
Party	Candidate	Votes	%	±%
Labor	Thomas Chesson	359	68.3	−31.7
Country	George Ellemor	167	31.7	+31.7
Total formal votes		526	100	
Informal votes		0	0	
Turnout		526	69.4	
Labor hold		Swing	N/A	

=== Elections in the 1910s ===
1917 Western Australian state election: Cue
Party	Candidate	Votes	%	±%
Labor	Thomas Chesson	unopposed		
Labor hold		Swing		

1914 Western Australian state election: Cue
Party	Candidate	Votes	%	±%
Labor	Thomas Chesson	unopposed		
Labor hold		Swing		

1913 Cue state by-election
Party	Candidate	Votes	%	±%
Labor	Thomas Chesson	unopposed		
Labor hold		Swing		

1911 Western Australian state election: Cue
Party	Candidate	Votes	%	±%
Labor	Edward Heitmann	unopposed		
Labor hold		Swing		

=== Elections in the 1900s ===
1908 Western Australian state election: Cue
Party	Candidate	Votes	%	±%
Labour	Edward Heitmann	1,415	68.8	+17.4
Ministerialist	James Chesson	642	31.2	−17.4
Total formal votes		2,057	99.0	+0.1
Informal votes		21	1.0	−0.1
Turnout		2,078	69.0	+17.4
Labour hold		Swing	+17.4	

1905 Western Australian state election: Cue
Party	Candidate	Votes	%	±%
Labour	Edward Heitmann	624	51.4	–5.0
Ministerialist	James Chesson	590	48.6	+5.0
Total formal votes		1,214	98.9	–0.5
Informal votes		13	1.1	+0.5
Turnout		1,218	51.6	–6.9
Labour hold		Swing	–5.0	

1904 Western Australian state election: Cue
Party	Candidate	Votes	%	±%
Labour	Edward Heitmann	854	56.4	+56.4
Ministerialist	Frederick Illingworth	661	43.6	–12.7
Total formal votes		1,515	99.4	+0.2
Informal votes		9	0.6	–0.2
Turnout		1,524	58.5	+15.1
Labour gain from Ministerialist		Swing	+56.4	

1901 Western Australian state election: Cue
Party	Candidate	Votes	%	±%
Opposition	Frederick Illingworth	407	56.3	+56.3
Opposition	William Patrick	316	43.7	+43.7
Total formal votes		723	99.2	n/a
Informal votes		6	0.8	n/a
Turnout		729	43.4	n/a
Opposition win		(new seat)		
