= Members of the Western Australian Legislative Assembly, 1921–1924 =

This is a list of members of the Western Australian Legislative Assembly between the 1921 election and the 1924 election, together known as the 11th Parliament. During the term, the Country Party split into rival factions, the Ministerial Country Party (MCP) which comprised the bulk of the parliamentary party—many of whom had switched allegiance from other parties since 1919—and the Executive Country Party (ECP), which was loyal to the Primary Producers' Association, which the Country Party was intended to represent in Parliament. After the 1924 election, which significantly strengthened the latter at the expense of the former, the Ministerial arm merged with the Nationalist Party.

Name	Party	District	Years in office
Edward Angelo	Country/MCP	Gascoyne	1917–1933
William Angwin	Labor	North-East Fremantle	1904–1905; 1906–1927
John Boyland^{[4]}	Ind. Nat.	Kalgoorlie	1921–1922
Frank Broun	Country/MCP	Beverley	1911–1914; 1917–1924
Lionel Carter	Nationalist	Leederville	1921–1924
Thomas Chesson	Labor	Cue	1913–1930
Alexander Clydesdale	Labor	Canning	1921–1930
Philip Collier	Labor	Boulder	1905–1948
Edwin Corboy	Labor	Yilgarn	1921–1933
Edith Cowan	Nationalist	West Perth	1921–1924
James Cunningham^{[4]}	Labor	Kalgoorlie	1923–1936
Joseph Davies	National Labor	Guildford	1917–1924
James Denton	Country/MCP	Moore	1921–1927
Michael Durack	Country/MCP	Kimberley	1917–1924
William James George	Nationalist	Murray-Wellington	1895–1902; 1909–1930
Frank Gibson	Nationalist	Fremantle	1921–1924
Tom Harrison	Country/MCP	Avon	1914–1924
Thomas Heron	Labor	Mount Leonora	1920–1928
Henry Hickmott	Country/MCP	Pingelly	1914–1924
John Holman^{[5]}	Labor	Forrest	1901–1921; 1923–1925
Thomas Hughes^{[3]}	Labor	East Perth	1922–1927; 1936–1943
Edward Johnston	Country/ECP	Williams-Narrogin	1911–1928
George Lambert	Labor	Coolgardie	1916–1930; 1933–1941
Charles Latham	Country/MCP	York	1921–1942
John Lutey	Labor	Brownhill-Ivanhoe	1916; 1917–1932
Alick McCallum	Labor	South Fremantle	1921–1935
Charles Maley	Country/MCP	Irwin	1921–1929
Henry Kennedy Maley^{[1]}	Country/MCP	Greenough	1917–1924; 1929–1930
Harry Mann	Nationalist	Perth	1921–1933
William Marshall	Labor	Murchison	1921–1952
Hon Sir James Mitchell	Nationalist	Northam	1905–1933
Griffin Money	Nationalist	Bunbury	1917–1924
John Mullany	National Labor	Menzies	1911–1924
Selby Munsie	Labor	Hannans	1911–1938
Peter O'Loghlen^{[5]}	Labor	Forrest	1908–1923
William Pickering	Country/ECP	Sussex	1917–1924
Alfred Piesse	Country/MCP	Toodyay	1911–1924
Walter Richardson	National Labor	Subiaco	1921–1933
Richard Sampson^{[2]}	Country/MCP	Swan	1921–1944
John Scaddan	Country/MCP	Albany	1904–1917; 1919–1924; 1930–1933
J. J. Simons^{[3]}	Labor/Ind./Nat.	East Perth	1921–1922
James MacCallum Smith	Nationalist	North Perth	1914–1939
John Henry Smith	Ind./Country/MCP	Nelson	1921–1936; 1939–1943
Sydney Stubbs	Country/MCP	Wagin	1911–1947
George Taylor	National Labor	Mount Margaret	1901–1930
Frederick Teesdale	Nationalist	Roebourne	1917–1931
Alec Thomson	Country/ECP	Katanning	1914–1930
John Thomson	Nationalist/Independent	Claremont	1921–1924
Michael Troy	Labor	Mount Magnet	1904–1939
Henry Underwood	National Labor	Pilbara	1906–1924
Thomas Walker	Labor	Kanowna	1905–1932
John Willcock	Labor	Geraldton	1917–1947
Arthur Wilson	Labor	Collie	1908–1947

== Notes ==
^{1} On 13 April 1921, Henry Kennedy Maley, member for Greenough, was appointed by Premier Sir James Mitchell as Minister for Agriculture. Maley was therefore required to resign and contest a ministerial by-election, at which he was returned unopposed on 14 May 1921.
^{2} On 22 August 1922, Richard Sampson, member for Swan, was appointed by Premier Sir James Mitchell as Colonial Secretary and Minister for Public Health. Sampson was therefore required to resign and contest a ministerial by-election, at which he was returned unopposed on 31 August 1922.
^{3} On 1 November 1922, the Nationalist (formerly Labor) member for East Perth, J. J. Simons, resigned. He subsequently nominated as a candidate for the resulting by-election on 18 November 1922, but was defeated by the Labor candidate, Thomas Hughes.
^{4} On 14 December 1922, the Independent member for Kalgoorlie, John Boyland, died. Labor candidate James Cunningham won the resulting by-election on 13 January 1923.
^{5} On 12 November 1923, the Labor member for Forrest, Peter O'Loghlen, died. The Labor candidate, long-serving former Murchison MLA John Holman, won the resulting by-election on 8 December 1923.

== Sources ==
- Black, David; Prescott, Valerie (1997). Election statistics, Legislative Assembly of Western Australia, 1890-1996. Perth: Parliamentary History Project. ISBN 0-7309-8409-5.
- Hughes, Colin A.; Graham, B. D. (1976). Voting for the South Australian, Western Australian and Tasmanian Lower Houses, 1890-1964. Canberra: Australian National University. ISBN 0-7081-1334-6.
