= List of mayors of Cottesloe =

The Town of Cottesloe in Perth, Western Australia was originally established on 4 October 1895 as a road board with a chairman and councillors under the District Roads Act 1871. On 20 September 1907, it was proclaimed a municipality, with a mayor and councillors, under the Municipal Corporations Act 1906. With the passage of the Local Government Act 1960, all municipalities became Towns effective 1 July 1961.

== Cottesloe Road District ==
Chairman	Term
John Foulkes	1895–1898
Octavius Lionel Haines	1898–1905
Thomas Ockerby	1905–1906
Frederic North	1906–1907

== Municipality of Cottesloe ==
Mayor	Term
John Stuart	1907–1908
Evan Wisdom	1908–1911
Frederic Dudley North	1911–1916
Thomas Ockerby	1916–1918
Thomas Henry Davey	1918–1921
Charles Melville Gibbons	1921–1923
Charles Frederic North	1923–1924
Aidan Hugh Bryan	1924–1928
Robert Wilkes	1928–1931
William Henry Ackland	1931–1932
John Black	1932–1945
Laurence Percival Gadsdon	1945–1961

== Town of Cottesloe ==
Mayor	Term
Cecil Leonard Harvey	1961–1974
James Anderson	1974–1987
Charles Murphy	1987–1994
Julian Donaldson	1994–1997
John Hammond	1997–2003
Robert Rowell	2003–2005
Kevin Morgan	2005–2013
Jo Dawkins	2013–2017
Philip Angers	2017–2021
Lorraine Young	2021–2025
Melissa Harkins	2025–present

== Sources ==
- James, Ruth Marchant (2007). Cottesloe : a town of distinction. Town of Cottesloe. pp. 381–382. ISBN 978-0-9804036-0-2.
- "A list of Elected Members of The Cottesloe Roads Boards & Cottesloe Councils" (PDF). Town of Cottesloe. January 2017.
