= 1902 Claremont state by-election =

A by-election for the seat of Claremont in the Legislative Assembly of Western Australia was held on 11 June 1902. It was triggered by the resignation of William Sayer (the sitting member) on 26 May. John Foulkes, a prominent local lawyer, won the election with 40.4 percent of the vote. Of the other four candidates, three entered (or re-entered) parliament themselves at later dates.

== Background ==
William Sayer had won Claremont at the 1901 state election, to continue serving as attorney-general in the government of George Throssell. He had been appointed to the position a month before entering parliament. However, Throssell's government was short-lived (and thus so was Sayer's time in the ministry), and he resigned from parliament on 26 May 1902 to take up the position of chief parliamentary draughtsman. The writ for the by-election was issued on 28 May, with the close of nominations on 5 June. Polling day was on 11 June, with the writ returned the following day.

== Candidates ==
- John Foulkes, an English-trained lawyer, stood as an Opposition candidate. He had previously served in the Legislative Council from 1894 to 1896.
- Joseph Langsford, an accountant originally from Adelaide, stood as an Opposition candidate. He had served as the Mayor of Claremont from 1899 to 1901, and also contested Claremont at the 1901 state election.
- Richard Pennefather, a Melbourne-trained lawyer, stood as an Opposition candidate. He had previously been a member of the Legislative Assembly from 1897 to 1901, representing Greenough, and served as attorney-general in the government of Sir John Forrest.
- George Temple-Poole, an English-trained architect and engineer, stood as a Ministerial candidate. He had been Western Australia's Principal Architect from 1891 to 1897, but had not previously held elective office.
- Frank Wilson, an English-born businessman, stood as an Ministerial candidate. He had previously been a member of the Legislative Assembly from 1897 to 1901, representing Canning and Perth, and also served on the Perth City Council.

== Results ==
Claremont state by-election, 1902
Party	Candidate	Votes	%	±%
Opposition	John Foulkes	634	41.4	+41.4
Ministerialist	Frank Wilson	318	20.8	+20.8
Opposition	Joseph Langsford	297	19.4	–15.0
Opposition	Richard Pennefather	182	11.9	+11.9
Ministerialist	George Temple-Poole	99	6.5	+6.5
Total formal votes		1,530	98.7	–0.5
Informal votes		20	1.3	+0.5
Turnout		1,550	50.8	–2.1
Opposition hold		Swing	N/A	

== Aftermath ==
Foulkes retained Claremont until his retirement at the 1911 state election, and eventually retired to England. Of his losing opponents, Langsford, Pennefather, and Wilson all either entered or re-entered parliament within the next decade. Langsford and Pennefather won election to the Legislative Council in 1904 and 1908, respectively, while Wilson won the seat of Sussex at the 1904 state election and went on to serve as Premier of Western Australia on two occasions (from 1910 to 1911 and from 1916 to 1917).

== See also ==
- List of Western Australian state by-elections
- Members of the Western Australian Legislative Assembly, 1901–1904
