= Frederick William Pennefather =

Lawyer (1852–1921)

- Born: 29 April 1852
- Died: 6 February 1921 (aged 68)
- Education: Trinity College, Cambridge
- Relatives: Edward Pennefather (grandfather)

Frederick William Pennefather (29 April 1852 – 6 February 1921) was an Australian lawyer.

== Early life ==
Frederick William Pennefather was born on 29 April 1852, the youngest son of Edward Pennefather QC.

He was educated at Trinity College, Cambridge, where he graduated B.A. 1874, LL.M. 1877, LL.D. 1891.

== Bar ==
He entered at Lincoln's Inn on 17 December 1874, and was called to the Bar on 17 November 1877. He went the south-eastern circuit, and was called to the Irish Bar in 1878.

He was private secretary to the Governor of South Australia from 1881 to 1883, and to the Governor of New Zealand from 1883 to 1886.

He was one of the Commissioners for New Zealand at the Colonial and Indian Exhibition in 1886; was appointed Lecturer on Laws in the University of Adelaide in 1887, and Professor of Laws in 1890, the same year he was admitted to the Bar in South Australia. In September 1896 he resigned from the professorship and the following year he agreed to assist in finding his successor.

Richard Pennefather (1851–1914), the ninth Attorney-General of Western Australia, was not related.

Pennefather died on 6 February 1921.
