= 1902 King's Birthday Honours (Australia) =

The 1902 King's Birthday Honours for Australia were announced on 10 November 1902.

== Knight Bachelor ==
- John Winthrop Hackett, MA, Member of the Legislative Council of the State of Western Australia.

== Order of Saint Michael and Saint George ==
=== Companion of the Order of St Michael and St George (CMG) ===
- Frederic Dudley North, Esq., Clerk of the Executive Council and Under Secretary in the Premier's Department of the State of Western Australia.
