= 1902 Coronation Honours (Australia) =

1902 appointments in honour of the new monarch

The 1902 Coronation Honours were awarded in honour of the coronation of Edward VII.

== Most Distinguished Order of St Michael and St George ==
=== Companion of the Order of St Michael and St George (CMG) ===
- Frederic Dudley North, Esq., Clerk of the Executive Council and Under Secretary in the Premier's Department of the State of Western Australia.
