= Thomas Duff (politician) =

Australian politician (1870–1949)

Member of the Legislative Assembly of Western Australia
- In office 14 September 1918 – 12 March 1921
- Preceded by: John Stewart
- Succeeded by: John Thomson
- Constituency: Claremont

Personal details
- Born: 7 April 1870 Carlton, Victoria, Australia
- Died: 6 June 1949 (aged 79) Subiaco, Western Australia, Australia
- Party: Nationalist

Thomas Duff (7 April 1870 – 6 June 1949) was an Australian businessman and politician who was a Nationalist Party member of the Legislative Assembly of Western Australia from 1918 to 1921.

Duff was born in Melbourne to Sophia (née Ross) and Robert Duff. He arrived in Western Australia in 1890, initially living in Perth and then moving to Kalgoorlie in 1893 during the gold rush. He floated a gold mine in 1895, and was later employed as a building inspector. Duff purchased a farming property in Merredin in 1904. He became the licensee of the Merredin Hotel in 1907, and from 1912 was a part-owner of the Merredin Mercury, a local newspaper. He also floated three more gold mines around that time, two in Marvel Loch and one in Westonia.

At the 1917 state election, Duff contested the seat of Avon, but was defeated by Tom Harrison of the Country Party. He moved to Cottesloe (a suburb of Perth) later in the year, and made a second run for parliament at the 1918 Claremont by-election, finishing with 54.3 percent of the two-party-preferred vote. Duff did not re contest Claremont at the 1921 state election, and subsequently returned to Merredin. He retired in 1936 and returned to Perth, where he died in June 1949, aged 79. He had married Esther Mary Markwell in 1895, with whom he had two children.

Parliament of Western Australia
Preceded by John Stewart	Member for Claremont; 1918–1921	Succeeded by John Thomson
