= Evan Wisdom =

Australian politician

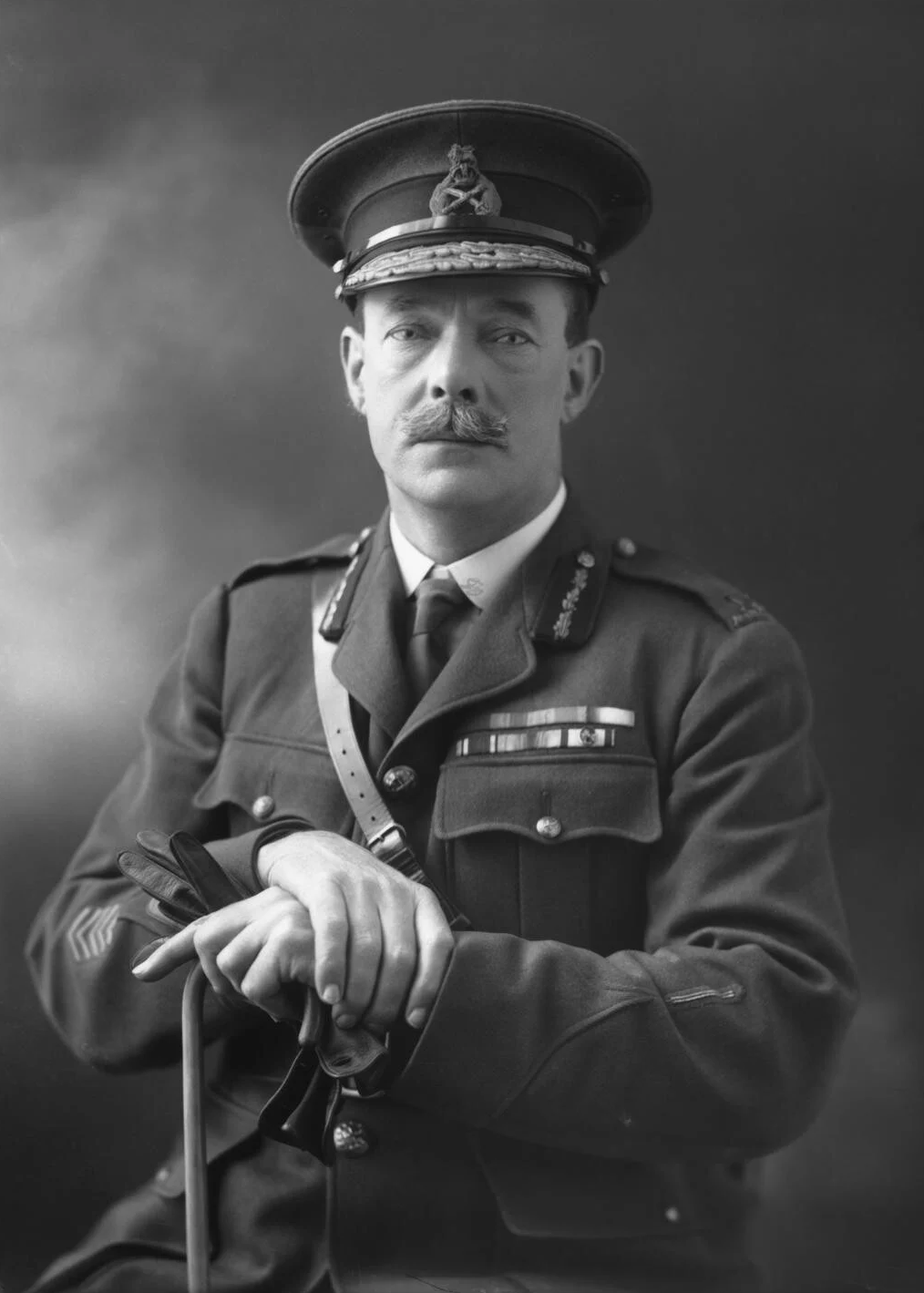
- Wisdom in 1919

Administrator of the Territory of New Guinea
- In office 21 March 1921 – 13 June 1933
- Preceded by: Thomas Griffiths
- Succeeded by: Thomas Griffiths

Member of the Western Australian Legislative Assembly for Claremont
- In office 7 October 1911 – 28 June 1917
- Preceded by: John Foulkes
- Succeeded by: John Stewart

Mayor of Cottesloe
- In office 1908–1911
- Preceded by: John Stuart
- Succeeded by: Frederic North

Personal details
- Born: 29 September 1869 Inverness, Scotland
- Died: 7 December 1945 (aged 76) Melbourne, Australia
- Party: Liberal

Military service
- Allegiance: Australia
- Branch/service: Australian Army
- Years of service: 1901–1921
- Rank: Brigadier General
- Commands: 7th Brigade (1916–19); 18th Battalion (1916)
- Battles/wars: First World War; Gallipoli Campaign; Western Front; Battle of Pozières; Battle of Arras; Battle of the Menin Road Ridge; Battle of Broodseinde; Battle of Passchendaele; Battle of Hamel; Battle of Amiens; Battle of Mont Saint-Quentin
- Awards: Companion of the Order of the Bath; Companion of the Order of St Michael and St George; Distinguished Service Order; Colonial Auxiliary Forces Officers' Decoration; Mentioned in Despatches (6); Order of Prince Danilo I (Montenegro)

Brigadier General Evan Alexander Wisdom, CB, CMG, DSO, VD (29 September 1869 – 7 December 1945) was an Australian army officer, politician and administrator. He was a general in the Australian Imperial Force (AIF) during World War I and later served as administrator of the Territory of New Guinea from 1921 to 1933.

Wisdom was born in Scotland and immigrated to Australia in 1891 during the Western Australian gold rushes, where he became a successful prospector and businessman on the Eastern Goldfields. He later moved to Perth where he was mayor of Cottesloe (1908–1911) and served in the Western Australian Legislative Assembly (1911–1917). Having been a reservist for many years, Wisdom joined the AIF in 1915 and served on the Gallipoli campaign, where he was awarded the Distinguished Service Order. He later commanded the 18th Battalion and the 7th Brigade on the Western Front.

== Early life ==
Born on 29 September 1869 at Inverness, Scotland, the son of Francis William Wisdom and Mary, née Cameron. He attended his education at Inverness and Edinburgh. After his education he served in a militia infantry battalion and was later transferred to the Midlothian Coast Artillery.

He emigrated to Australia in 1891 to seek his fortune and settled in Western Australia, where he began as a prospector to Southern Cross at Yilgarn. In 1892, with the discovery of gold at Coolgardie, he went prospecting and found success. With the money made from his prospecting, he opened a store at Coolgardie. He later joined the gold rush at Kalgoorlie and again had success. He acquired extensive mining interests and set up the Exchange Hotel, Kalgoorlie.

Travelling back to Scotland in 1894, he married Agnes Bell Jackson on 16 April 1895 at Edinburgh. Together they emigrated to Western Australia and bought a house at Claremont, Perth. Retaining his business interests in the goldfields, he became active in the Citizens Military Force upon creation and was appointed lieutenant in the Western Australian Mounted Infantry, with the command of the Cannington troop. Promoted to captain in 1903 and in 1904, he was posted to militia headquarters in Perth. He later became the brigade major of the Western Australian Infantry Brigade in 1908. Fostering a desire to enter politics, he became the mayor of Cottesloe between 1908 and 1913 and later went on to be the Liberal member for Claremont in the Legislative Assembly from 1911 to 1917.

== First World War ==
With the outbreak of war, he was appointed the commandant of the Karrakatta training camp in 1914. Commissioned into the First Australian Imperial Force in March 1915 as brigade major of the 5th Brigade, serving with the brigade for the majority of the Gallipoli campaign. He was awarded the Distinguished Service Order for his services at Gallipoli. Given command of the 18th Battalion in February 1916 and arriving in France in March. He led the battalion during the Battle of Pozières Heights and the Battles of the Somme. He was promoted to colonel and temporary brigadier general and appointed to command the 7th Brigade and led the brigade at the Battle of Lagnicourt in March 1917 and the Second Battle of Bullecourt in May. Wisdom was appointed the Companion of the Order of the Bath in June. He went on to command the brigade at battles which captured the Menin Road, Broodseinde and Passchendaele.

During the western front campaigns of 1918, Wisdom led the 7th Brigade at the Third Battle of Morlancourt in June, the Battle of Hamel in July, and took part in the Battle of Amiens, storming Mont St Quentin and then the Battle of Beaurevoir. Wisdom was appointed Companion of the Order of St Michael and St George for his leadership in January 1919. He had been mentioned in despatches six times for his outstanding services during the war.

After the war's end Wisdom remained in England and worked in the AIF's repatriation and demobilisation department. He subsequently returned to Australia and was appointed chairman of the Central War Gratuities Board in May 1920.

== New Guinea ==
In 1920, Wisdom successfully applied for the newly created position of administrator of the Territory of New Guinea – the former colony of German New Guinea which had been occupied by Australia during the war and later made a League of Nations mandate. He was the first civilian administrator, replacing the military administration, and was chosen by the Hughes government from over 30 applicants.

Wisdom formally took up the administratorship on 21 March 1921. His initial task was to convert the military administration into a permanent public service. He quickly came into conflict with Edmund Piesse, the head of the Pacific branch in the Prime Minister's Department, over land and labour policy, with Wisdom trying to make greater use of indigenous-held land and labourers to support his development initiatives

Wisdom left New Guinea in June 1932, taking a year of leave prior to his formal retirement on 13 June 1933. According to Susan Pedersen, Wisdom protected a system of indentured labor that allowed planters, traders and mining companies to extract the resources of New Guinea.

== Personal life ==
In 1895, while on a return visit to Scotland, Wisdom married Agnes Jackson; the couple had no children. He was widowed in 1931.

After leaving New Guinea, Wisdom maintained residences in Perth and Melbourne and was involved in various mining ventures in Western Australia. He died on 7 December 1945, aged 76, at St Andrews Hospital in East Melbourne and was cremated.
