= Charles North (politician) =

Australian lawyer and politician

The Honourable Charles North

14th Speaker of the Legislative Assembly of Western Australia
- In office 31 July 1947 – 5 August 1953
- Premier: Ross McLarty; Albert Hawke
- Preceded by: Joseph Sleeman
- Succeeded by: Aloysius Rodoreda

Member of the Legislative Assembly for Claremont
- In office 22 March 1924 – 7 April 1956
- Preceded by: John Thomson
- Succeeded by: Harold Cromellin

Personal details
- Born: 14 September 1887 Perth, Western Australia
- Died: 30 September 1979 Nedlands, Western Australia
- Party: Commonwealth Liberal (1914); Nationalist (to 1945); Liberal (from 1945)
- Education: Oriel College, Oxford

Charles Frederic John North (14 September 1887 – 30 September 1979) was an Australian lawyer and politician who was a member of the Legislative Assembly of Western Australia from 1924 to 1956, initially representing the Nationalist Party and later the Liberal Party. He was Speaker of the Legislative Assembly from 1947 to 1953.

== Early life ==
North was born in Perth to Flora Frances (née Hamersley) and Frederic Dudley North. His father, a prominent civil servant, was a grandson of the Scottish artist Sir Francis Grant and a descendant of the Barons North. His mother was the daughter of Edward Hamersley II, a member of the pioneering Hamersley family of Western Australia. North attended Hale School, Perth, before being sent to England to continue his education at Rugby School. He studied law at Oriel College, Oxford, graduating in 1909 with a Bachelor of Arts. He was also a member of the college eight for three years. North was called to the Bar as part of the Middle Temple in 1912. He was admitted to the Western Australian bar upon his return to Australia the following year, and, making his debut in politics, went on to contest the 1914 federal election for the Commonwealth Liberal Party, standing for the Senate. North served as a captain in the No. 16 Squadron RAF in World War I, as an observer-air gunner. He returned to Western Australia after the conclusion of the war, practising as a solicitor in Perth. He was elected to the Cottesloe Municipal Council in 1921, and served as Mayor of Cottesloe from 1923 to 1924.

== Politics ==
North was elected to the seat of Claremont at the 1924 state election, defeating a Labor candidate, George Dennis, and the sitting member, John Thomson, who had lost the endorsement of the Nationalists in favour of North. He was appointed government whip in 1930, and remained whip of the Nationalists (and, from 1945, the Liberals) until assuming the role of speaker in 1947. North held Claremont with large margins at every election during this time, with the exceptions of 1933 and 1936, when another Nationalist candidate, Donald Cleland, reduced the margin to less than 400 votes. During the 1930s, North became involved in the Social Credit movement, and served as state president of the Douglas Social Credit Movement. North also served as president of the Cottesloe sub-branch of the Returned and Services League (RSL), and as patron of the Claremont Football Club and North Cottesloe Surf Life-saving Club.

In July 1947, following the anti-Labor coalition's victory at the 1947 election, North was appointed Speaker of the Legislative Assembly, serving until the McLarty government's defeat at the 1953 election. Notably, as the first non-Labor speaker for fourteen years, he chose to wear the traditional dress associated with the position, including horsehair wig. Despite having held Claremont for 32 years, North was outpolled by two other Liberal candidates at the 1956 election, finishing with only 24.96% on first preferences as Harold Crommelin was elected in his place. North died at Sir Charles Gairdner Hospital in September 1979. He had received the Silver Jubilee Medal of King George V in 1935 and the Coronation Medal of King George VI in 1937. In 1916, he had married Bessie Saddington, with whom he had two daughters.

== See also ==
- Members of the Western Australian Legislative Assembly

Parliament of Western Australia
Preceded by Joseph Sleeman	Speaker of the Legislative Assembly; 1947–1953	Succeeded by Aloysius Rodoreda
Preceded by John Thomson	Member for Claremont; 1924–1956	Succeeded by Harold Crommelin
