= William Mann (Australian politician) =

Australian newspaperman and politician

The Honourable William Mann
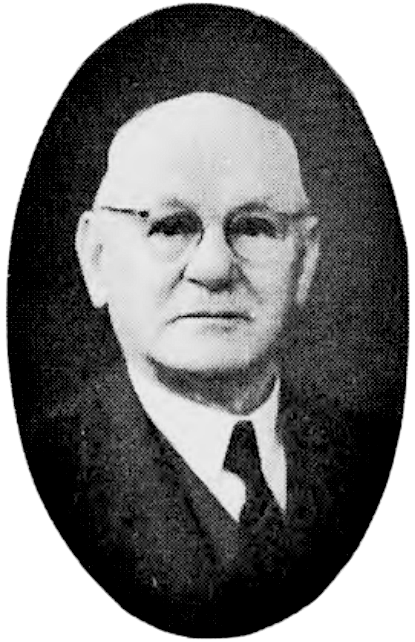

Member of the Legislative Council of Western Australia
- In office 22 May 1926 – 22 April 1951
- Preceded by: Francis Willmott
- Succeeded by: James Murray
- Constituency: South-West Province

Personal details
- Born: 17 October 1875 Ballarat, Victoria, Australia
- Died: 22 April 1951 (aged 75) Perth, Western Australia, Australia
- Party: Nationalist (to 1945); Liberal (from 1945)

William Joseph Mann (17 October 1875 – 22 April 1951) was an Australian newspaperman and politician who was a member of the Legislative Council of Western Australia from 1926 until his death, representing South-West Province.

Mann was born in Ballarat, Victoria, to Mary (née Callow) and William Quick Mann. Having learnt the printing trade in Victoria, he came to Western Australia in 1896, living for periods in Kalgoorlie, Perth, and Fremantle. Mann eventually moved to Busselton, where in 1903 he established what would become the town's main newspaper, the South-Western News. He would remain the proprietor and editor of the publication until 1935. He was also involved with various press organisations, serving as the president of the Australian Provincial Press Association (a forerunner of the Australian Press Council) from 1923 to 1925 and also as an Australian delegate to the Empire Press Union. Standing for the Nationalist Party, Mann was elected to parliament at the 1926 Legislative Council elections, defeating the sitting Country Party member, Francis Willmott. He was re-elected in 1932, 1938, and 1946, switching to the newly formed Liberal Party in 1945. Mann died in office in April 1951, aged 75.
