= Richard Pennefather (Australian politician) =

Australian politician

The Honourable Richard William Pennefather KC
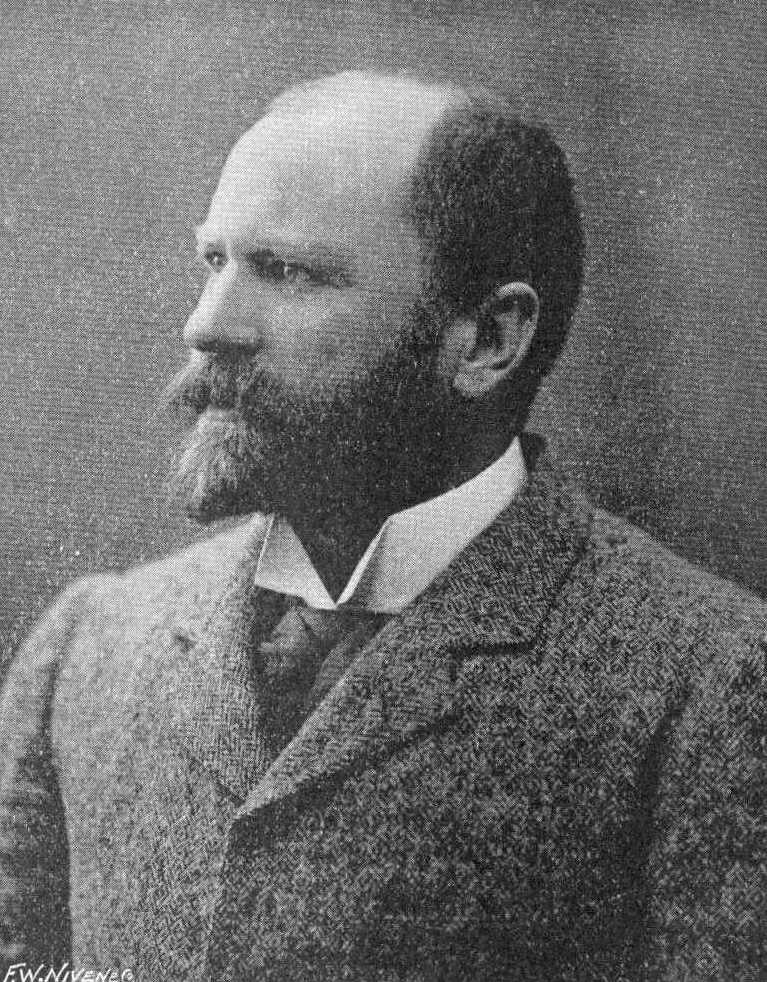
- Richard Pennefather c.1897

9th Attorney-General of Western Australia
- In office 27 October 1897 – 20 March 1901
- Preceded by: Septimus Burt
- Succeeded by: William Sayer
- Constituency: Greenough

Personal details
- Born: 16 July 1851 Tipperary, County Tipperary, Ireland
- Died: 16 January 1914 (aged 62) Swanbourne, Western Australia, Australia
- Party: Independent Ministerial
- Spouse: Florie Edith Fullagar (1872- )
- Children: Irene (Renee) Sylvia (1898-1985)
- Profession: Barrister

Richard William Pennefather (16 July 1851 – 16 January 1914) was the ninth Attorney-General of Western Australia, its third since responsible government. He served two terms as Member of the Legislative Assembly for Greenough; was Acting Justice of the WA Supreme Court (1901–1902); then was elected to the Legislative Council for North Province in 1908. He died in office on 16 January 1914.

== Early life ==
Pennefather was born 16 July 1851 in County Tipperary, Ireland, eldest son of Frederick Pennefather and Ann Parsons. The family moved to Melbourne, Victoria, where Pennefather received private tuition, then attended St Patrick's College, then afterwards Melbourne University where in 1878 he gained his BA and LLB degrees. He worked for five years in the Crown Solicitor's office, engaged in instructing the Crown Prosecutors on circuit, then in 1876 was admitted to the Victorian bar, where he practiced for 10 years. In 1880 he was admitted to the NSW bar, where he practiced for two years, before returning to Melbourne. In 1880 he was admitted to the Queensland bar but never practiced there. He was appointed QC in Sydney in 1883. In all he practiced for fifteen years at the Victorian bar.

In March 1896 Pennefather went to Western Australia. During the period required to establish WA residency for admission to the Western Australian bar he travelled over the colony particularly to the eastern mining areas, at that time in the rise of a major gold boom. He returned to Perth in November 1896 and was admitted to practice at the end of that year.

== Political career ==
Pennefather was acknowledged as a fluent and eloquent speaker. At the general elections for the Western Australian Legislative Assembly in 1897, Pennefather stood for the Greenough constituency as a supporter of the Forrest Government, winning the seat by a substantial majority. In October 1897 Premier Sir John Forrest appointed Pennefather Attorney-General in the Cabinet upon the retirement of Septimus Burt. He served two terms, from 27 October 1897 to 20 March 1901.

In 1901 Pennefather resigned his Legislative Assembly seat, was appointed KC and Acting-Justice of the WA Supreme Court, during the leave of absence of the Chief Justice. In 1902 he returned to practice for three years. He unsuccessfully contested the 1902 Claremont by-election, and eventually re-entered parliament at the 1908 Legislative Council elections, winning election to North Province. He died in office in 1914, aged 62.

== Personal life ==
Pennefather married Florie Edith Fullagar of Parramatta, on 7 October 1897 at Perth's Roman Catholic cathedral. A daughter, Irene Sylvia was born in 1898.

In 1898 he built a substantial residence, The Laurels, now the Cottesloe Civic Centre, on top of a sand dune at the then northern extent of Broome Street, Cottesloe. In 1911 he sold the house to Claude de Bernales, moving to "Oakham", 50 Shenton Road, Claremont, now Swanbourne. He died there on 16 Jan 1914 after a long illness, hastened by a Perth summer heat wave, survived by his wife and daughter. He was buried at Karrakatta Cemetery.

Pennefather Street in Canberra was named (in 1970) for Judge Pennefather, as was Pennefather Lane in Cottesloe.
