= William Sayer =

Australian politician

William Sayer KC
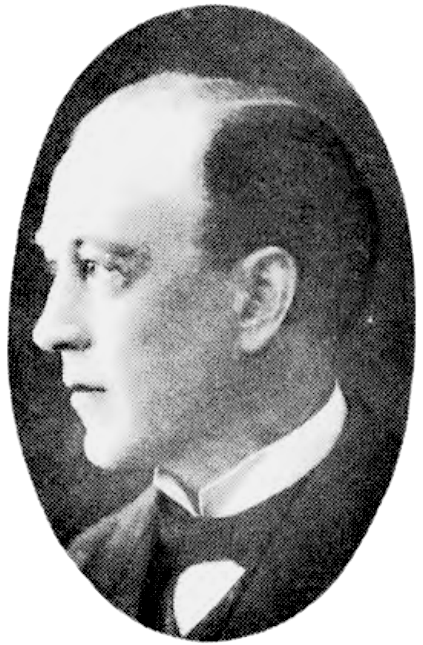

Attorney-General of Western Australia
- In office 25 March – 27 May 1901
- Premier: George Throssell
- Preceded by: Richard Pennefather
- Succeeded by: George Leake

Member of the Legislative Assembly of Western Australia
- In office 24 April 1901 – 26 May 1902
- Preceded by: None (new seat)
- Succeeded by: John Foulkes
- Constituency: Claremont

Personal details
- Born: 3 December 1857 London, England
- Died: 26 February 1943 (aged 85) Darlington, Western Australia, Australia

William Frederic Sayer KC (3 December 1857 – 26 February 1943) was an Australian lawyer and politician who was a member of the Legislative Assembly of Western Australia from 1901 to 1902. He was attorney-general in the short-lived government of George Throssell.

Sayer was born in London, and attended the University College School before going on to study law. He came to Western Australia in 1890 to work as a legal adviser to the Midland Railway Company. He later worked for the colonial government, serving as a secretary in the Law Department and then as Commissioner of Titles from 1898 to 1901 (a position in the Department of Lands and Surveys). In March 1901, despite not being a member of parliament, Sayer was appointed attorney-general in the ministry of George Throssell (succeeding Richard Pennefather).

At the 1901 state election, a month after being elevated to the ministry, Sayer won the newly created seat of Claremont. However, at the same election, Throssell's government lost its majority, eventually leading to its demise in May 1901. Sayer was replaced as attorney-general by the new premier, George Leake. He remained in parliament for only another year, resigning in May 1902 to accept the position of chief parliamentary draughtsman. In December 1902, Sayer was appointed crown solicitor (equivalent to Solicitor-General) in succession to Robert Bruce Burnside, a position which he held until his retirement in 1930. He died in February 1943, aged 85.

Parliament of Western Australia
New creation	Member for Claremont; 1901–1902	Succeeded by John Foulkes
Political offices
Preceded by Richard Pennefather	Attorney-General; 1901	Succeeded by George Leake
