= John Foulkes =

Australian politician

The Honourable John Foulkes

Member of the Legislative Council of Western Australia
- In office 16 July 1894 – 27 July 1896 Serving with Edward McLarty and John Winthrop Hackett
- Preceded by: None (new creation)
- Succeeded by: William Spencer
- Constituency: South-West Province

Member of the Legislative Assembly of Western Australia
- In office 11 June 1902 – 3 October 1911
- Preceded by: William Sayer
- Succeeded by: Evan Wisdom
- Constituency: Claremont

Personal details
- Born: 22 March 1861 Llanyblodwel, Shropshire, England
- Died: 4 December 1935 (aged 74) Chiswick, London, England
- Education: St John's College, Cambridge

John Charles Griffiths Foulkes (22 March 1861 – 4 December 1935) served in both houses of the Parliament of Western Australia, as a member of the Legislative Council from 1894 to 1896 and as a member of the Legislative Assembly from 1902 to 1911.

Foulkes was born in Llanyblodwel, Shropshire, England, a small village on the Welsh border. He attended Shrewsbury School before going on to St John's College, Cambridge, where he graduated in 1884. Foulkes afterward trained as a solicitor, serving his articles of clerkship in Wrexham, Wales. He came to Western Australia in 1890, and set up a law practice in Bunbury. In 1894, he stood for the Legislative Council's South-West Province, and was elected to a two-year term. In December 1895, Foulkes left on a health trip to Europe, intending to return in time to contest his seat at the 1896 Legislative Council elections. However, on the return voyage, his wife was taken ill with malaria, forcing them to remain in Italy while she recovered (and him to miss the election and thus lose his seat).

After eventually arriving back in Australia, Foulkes moved his law practice to Perth. He re-entered parliament at the 1902 Claremont by-election, which had been caused by the resignation of the sitting member, William Sayer, and retained it at the 1904 state election. When parliament sat for the first time after the 1904 election, Foulkes was nominated by the government of Walter James (recently reduced to a minority in the assembly) to serve as speaker. The opposing candidate, Mathieson Jacoby, was elected "by a large margin", a result which was said to have marked "the beginning of the end" for the James government. Foulkes remained in parliament until his retirement at the 1911 state election, and in 1913 returned to England. He died in London in December 1935, aged 74. His brother-in-law, Adam Jameson, was also a member of parliament.

Parliament of Western Australia
Preceded by William Sayer	Member for Claremont; 1902–1911	Succeeded by Evan Wisdom
