= John Stewart (Western Australian politician) =

Australian politician

Member of the Legislative Assembly of Western Australia
- In office 29 September 1917 – 20 August 1918
- Preceded by: Evan Wisdom
- Succeeded by: Thomas Duff
- Constituency: Claremont

Personal details
- Born: 23 May 1868 Glasgow, Scotland
- Died: 30 August 1927 (aged 59)
- Party: Liberal (to 1917); Nationalist (from 1917)

John Stewart (23 May 1868 – 30 August 1927) was an Australian businessman and politician who briefly represented the seat of Claremont in the Legislative Assembly of Western Australia, from 1917 to 1918.

Stewart was born in Glasgow, Scotland, to Jeannie (née Moore) and Bruce Stewart. He arrived in Western Australia in the 1890s, and by 1897 was working as an accountant in Fremantle. In 1900, he founded a produce firm, John Stewart & Co., and subsequently became prominent in Fremantle's mercantile sector, serving as a president of the Fremantle Chamber of Commerce. At the 1914 state election, Stewart unsuccessfully contested the seat of Fremantle as a Liberal candidate, opposing the Labor government of John Scaddan. He was defeated by Labor's William Carpenter, the sitting member, placing second (in front of another Liberal candidate) with 29.40 percent of the vote.

A strong supporter of the war effort against Germany, Stewart resigned from the Fremantle Chamber of Commerce in June 1916 to protest its apparent unwillingness to bar "persons of enemy birth" from membership. Prominent in local Presbyterian circles, he was a member of the boards of Scotch College and Presbyterian Ladies' College, each located in the seat of Claremont. Stewart stood for that electorate at the 1917 election, running as one of three Nationalist candidates. He placed second on first preferences, but on the two-candidate-preferred vote eventually won on a majority of just two votes, following a recount. Stewart's time in parliament, however, was short-lived, as he resigned due to ill-health less than a year after taking office. The resulting by-election was won by another Nationalist, Thomas Duff.

Stewart had married Lily Berry Tate in June 1897 in Fremantle, and the couple went on to have four sons and a daughter together. Later becoming residents of Cottesloe, the couple left for an extended tour of Europe in 1926. On the return voyage to Australia, on the SS Narkunda in late August 1927, they were at sea near Gibraltar when Stewart jumped from a porthole wearing only his pyjamas. Both he and an engineer who had dived after him were drowned, and an inquest returned a verdict of suicide, brought on by "acute insomnia and neurasthenia". Aged 59 at the time of his death, Stewart was eulogised in The West Australian as a "capable business man" and "generous donor", "possessing gifts above the average".
