= Ada Bromham =

Australian feminist and temperance worker

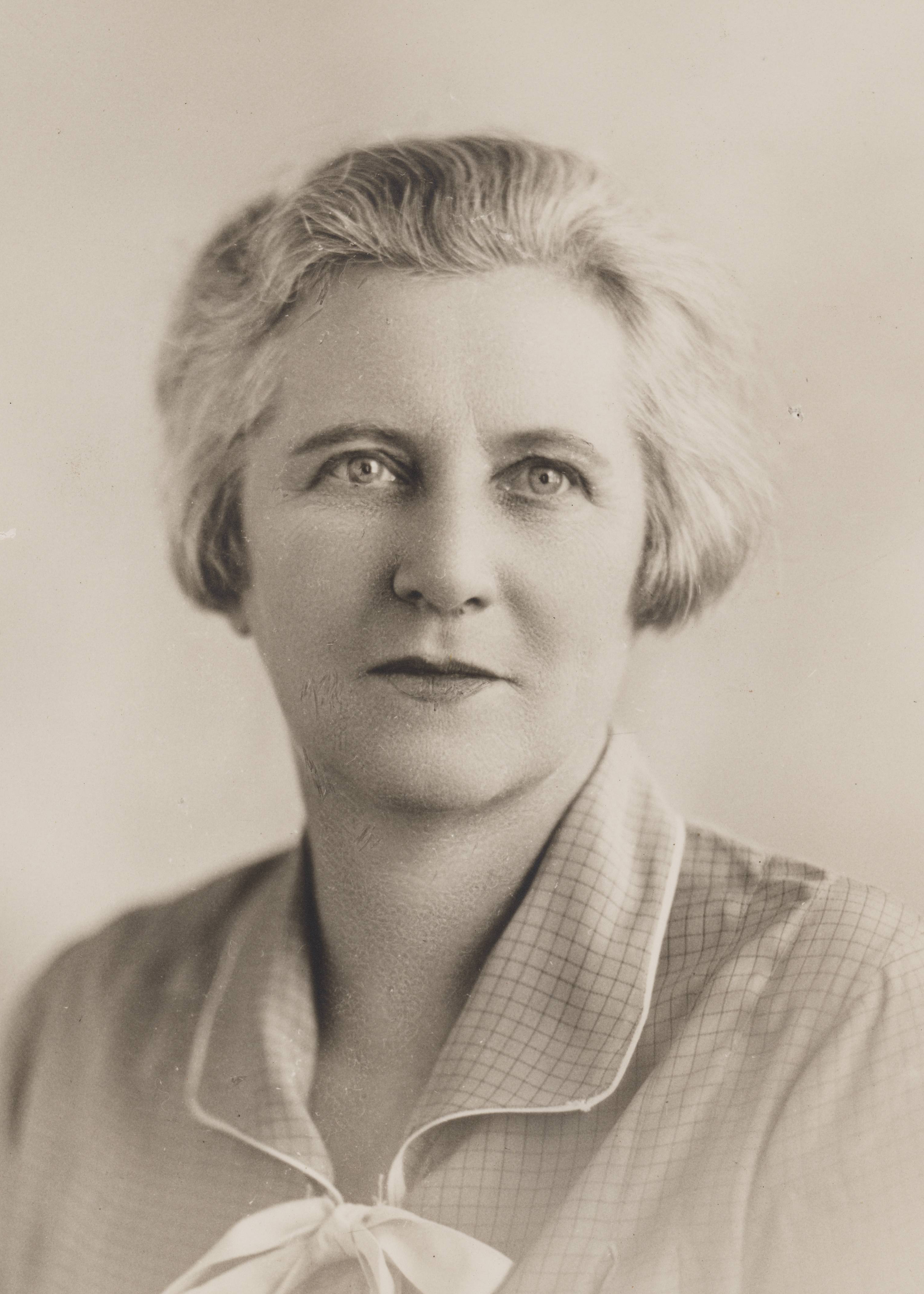
Ada Bromham, c. 1925

Ada Bromham (20 December 1880 – 15 March 1965) was an Australian feminist and temperance activist.

== Biography ==
Bromham was born in Gobur, Victoria to blacksmith Frederick Bromham and Charlotte, née Bradford. She was educated at Yarck before moving with her family to Western Australia in 1893. She attended school at Fremantle and then became a doctor's receptionist. Her mother died in 1908 and Bromham worked at a drapery shop in Claremont, lodging with the daughters of former Fremantle mayor and temperance campaigner Thomas Smith. By the early 1920s, with the business prospering, she began to engage in social issues, and unsuccessfully contested the 1921 state election. She was president of the West Australian Temperance Alliance and secretary of the Australian Women's Equal Citizenship Federation in 1925 before becoming secretary of the Australian Federation of Women's Societies in 1926.

In June 1926, Bromham led the Australian delegation to the International Suffrage Alliance Conference in Paris and then represented Australia at a conference of the British Empire League in London on emigration. She left Perth for Melbourne in January 1934 and further represented her union at conventions and conferences in Stockholm and London. She became general secretary of the Woman's Christian Temperance Union (WCTU) in 1937 and moved to Adelaide, contesting Unley at the 1941 state election. She retired briefly in 1946 before returning to Melbourne in 1947 as general secretary. She retired again at the end of 1949.

Following her retirement from the temperance movement, Bromham became involved in the Chinese-Australian Friendship Society, joining a peace delegation to Peking at a time when China was highly unpopular. She continued to support the WCTU but found her Christian Socialist beliefs increasingly at odds with the union's conservative agenda, and returned to Western Australia in 1959. She also campaigned for Aboriginal rights.

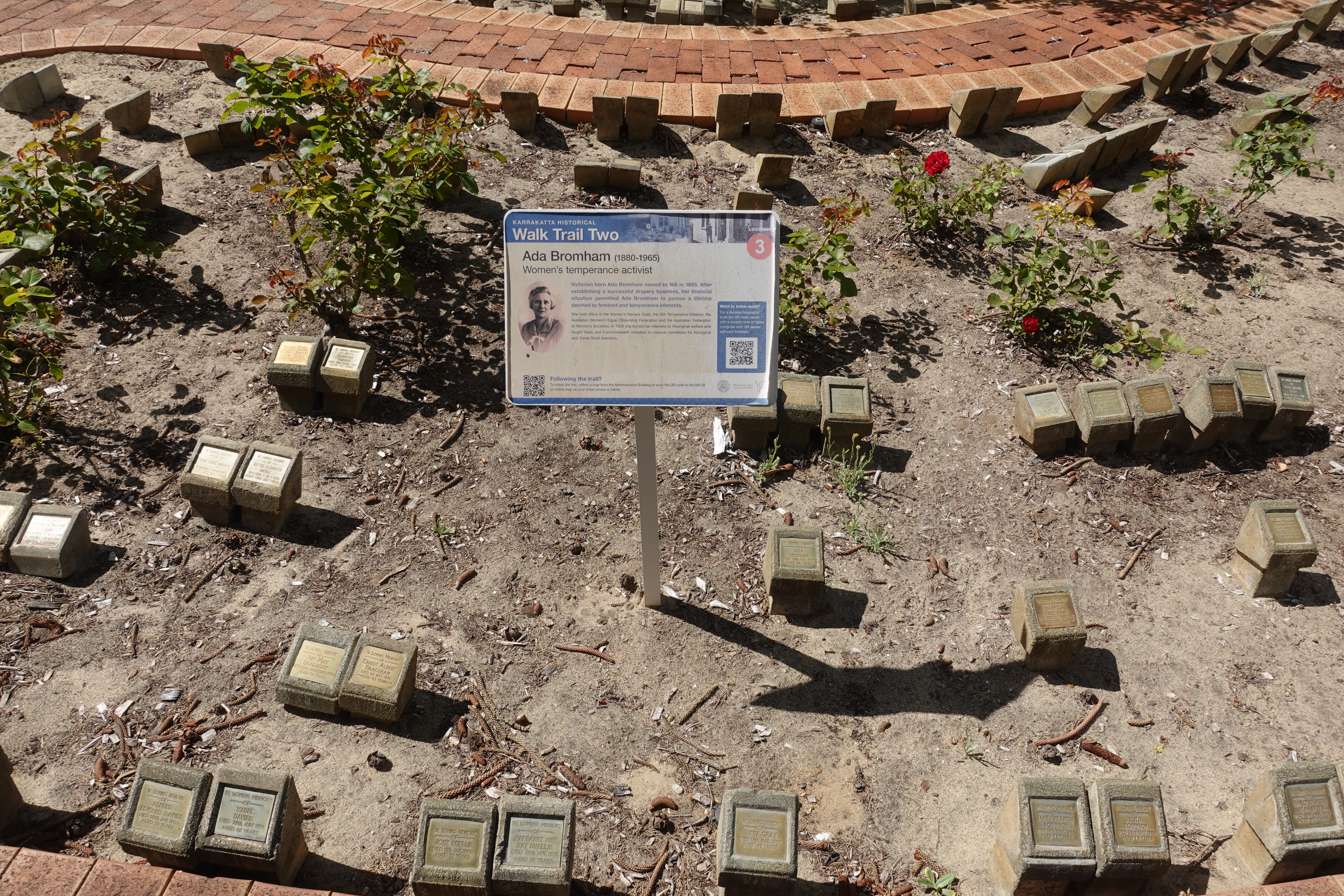
Memorial and information plaques at Karrakatta Cemetery

Bromham died at Brentwood Hospital of bronchopneumonia in 1965 and was cremated. A memorial plaque is located at Karrakatta Cemetery, where it features in one of the cemetery's historical walking trails.

== General references ==
- Bromham, Ada (1880 - 1965) at The Encyclopedia of Women and Leadership in Twentieth-Century Australia
