= Francis Willmott =

Australian politician

The Honourable Francis Willmott
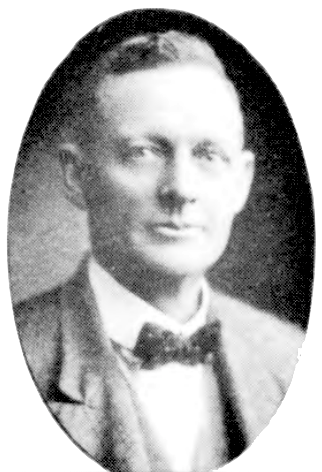

Leader of the Country Party in Western Australia
- In office 31 March 1915 – 30 July 1919
- Deputy: Alfred Piesse
- Preceded by: James Gardiner
- Succeeded by: Tom Harrison

Member of the Legislative Assembly of Western Australia
- In office 21 October 1914 – 12 March 1921
- Preceded by: Charles Layman
- Succeeded by: John Henry Smith
- Constituency: Nelson

Member of the Legislative Council of Western Australia
- In office 11 May 1921 – 21 May 1926 Serving with John Ewing and Edwin Rose
- Preceded by: Ephraim Clarke
- Succeeded by: William Mann
- Constituency: South-West Province

Personal details
- Born: 1870 Kirkley, Suffolk, England
- Died: 29 January 1941 (aged 70) Subiaco, Western Australia, Australia
- Party: Country

Francis Edward Sykes Willmott (1870 – 29 January 1941) was an Australian politician who was a member of both houses of the Parliament of Western Australia, serving in the Legislative Assembly from 1914 to 1921, and then in the Legislative Council from 1921 to 1926. He was the leader of the Country Party from 1915 to 1919.

== Early life ==
Willmott was born in Kirkley, Suffolk, England, where his father, Henry Willmott, was the rector. He was educated at St John's College, Hurstpierpoint, and was a prefect in his final year. Willmott came to Western Australia in 1886, and initially worked on Edward Brockman's property in the South West. He later married Brockman's daughter, Frances Edith, and his brother-in-law, Edmund Vernon Brockman, was also a member of parliament. In 1896, Willmott went to Coolgardie to work on the Goldfields Water Supply Scheme, supervising the tanks at Niagara and Mulline. He later supervised the construction of a road between Widgiemooltha and Esperance. Willmott eventually returned to the South West, and from 1902 to 1914 worked as a ranger for the Forests Department. He had a property near Bridgetown, where he had a dairy farm and fruit orchards.

== Politics ==
At the 1914 state election, Willmott stood for the newly formed Country Party, defeating the sitting member for the seat of Nelson, Charles Layman. After the election, he was elected deputy leader of the party, with James Gardiner chosen as leader. Gardiner resigned from the position in March 1915, with Willmott elected in his place (and Alfred Piesse as his deputy). In July 1916, the Country Party combined with the Liberal Party (led by Frank Wilson) to bring down the Labor government of John Scaddan. Wilson served as premier until June 1917, when he was replaced by Henry Lefroy (and the Liberal Party concurrently changed its name to the Nationalist Party). Willmott was appointed a minister without portfolio in the new ministry, and retained the position until his defeat at the 1921 state election, serving under two more Nationalist premiers (Hal Colebatch and James Mitchell). He had resigned as Country Party leader in July 1919, and was replaced by Tom Harrison.

Willmott's time out of parliament was short-lived, as within two months he won a Legislative Council by-election for South-West Province, necessitated by the death of Ephraim Clarke. Clarke had been elected to a six-year term in 1920, and Willmott consequently did not face re-election for another five years. At the 1926 election, he finished third behind Nationalist and Labor candidates with 29.2 percent of the vote, with the Nationalist Party's William Mann winning. After leaving parliament, Willmott returned to his Bridgetown farm, eventually retiring to Busselton in 1938. He died in Perth in 1941, aged 70, after a period of ill health. Willmott's son, Francis Drake Willmott, and nephew, William Willmott, were also members of parliament.

== See also ==
- Members of the Western Australian Legislative Assembly
- Members of the Western Australian Legislative Council
