= Frederic North =

English-born public servant and sportsman (1866–1921)

Frederic North CMG
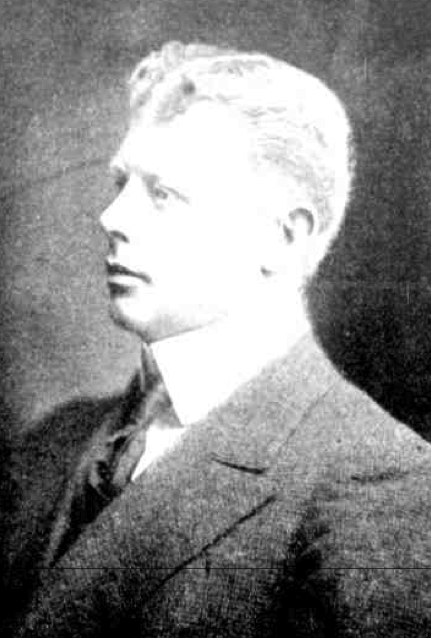
- A portrait of Frederic North published in The West Australian, 22 November 1902.

Personal information
- Full name: Frederic Dudley North
- Born: 9 November 1866; Earls Court, Kensington, London, England
- Died: 22 August 1921 (aged 54); Cottesloe, Western Australia
- Nickname: Piggy
- Batting: Right-handed
- Bowling: Right-arm slow
- Role: Batsman

Domestic team information
- Years: Team
- 1892/93: Western Australia

Career statistics
Competition	First-class
Matches	2
Runs scored	109
Batting average	27.25
100s/50s	0/1
Top score	77
Balls bowled	36
Wickets	2
Bowling average	7.00
5 wickets in innings	0
10 wickets in match	0
Best bowling	2/14
Catches/stumpings	1/–
- Source: CricketArchive, 29 August 2011

Frederic Dudley North CMG (9 November 1866 – 22 August 1921) was an English-born public servant and sportsman. A descendant of the Barons North, he attended Rugby School before emigrating to Western Australia in 1886. North played two first-class matches for Western Australia, and was also involved in cricket administration, serving as the first secretary of the Western Australian Cricket Association (WACA). Outside of cricket, North worked as a public servant, filling various roles in the Western Australian government, including secretary to Sir John Forrest, the first Premier of Western Australia, and head Colonial Secretary's Department. He was also Mayor of Cottesloe in 1906 and 1907 and again from 1911 to 1916. North died in Cottesloe from a heart attack in 1921, at the age of 54.

== Early life ==
North was born on 9 November 1866, in Kensington in London, to Charles Augustus North and Rachel Elizabeth Grant. On his father's side, he was a descendant of the Barons North. His mother was a daughter of the Scottish artist Sir Francis Grant. He was educated at Rugby School, playing two matches for the school's cricket team against Marlborough College, taking 10 wickets. North emigrated to Perth, Western Australia, in 1886, becoming a junior clerk in the Lands Department in January 1887. On 19 January 1887, he married Flora Frances Hamersley, the daughter of Edward Hamersley II, a member of the pioneering Hamersley family, and sister-in-law to John Forrest. He later had four children with her – two sons and two daughters, including Charles Frederic North, who later served as the Speaker of the Western Australian Legislative Assembly.

== Sporting career ==
North was a pioneer of cricket in Western Australia, organising the first tour of the eastern colonies by a state representative team, in 1893, and serving as the first secretary of the Western Australian Cricket Association (WACA). In 1943, the Western Mail described him as "one of the greatest batsmen who ever played in W.A." He also participated in Western Australia's first two first-class cricket matches; against South Australia and Victoria, in March and April 1893 respectively. North was the top scorer in the first innings of Western Australia's match against South Australia, scoring 25 batting at #4. In the second innings of Western Australia's match against Victoria, he scored 77 batting at #3, which was Western Australia's first half-century in first-class cricket. He also took 2/14 in Victoria's first innings, dismissing Australian Test batsman Samuel Morris. Playing for the Metropolitans Cricket Club in the Western Australian Grade Cricket competition, North led the First Grade batting aggregates in 1891–92 (243 runs) and 1892–93 (297 runs at an average of 27.00), and the First Grade bowling aggregates in 1887–88 (44 wickets at an average of 4.06). North also captained the Claremont-Cottesloe Cricket Club.

North also represented Western Australia at tennis, and founded the Sea View Golf Club in Cottesloe in 1909. His former residence on Forrest Street, named Catlidge and designed by architect George Temple-Poole, served as the first clubhouse.

== Public service career ==
In 1891, North was appointed clerk of the Executive Council of Western Australia. He served as secretary to the Premier of Western Australia, John Forrest, also serving as aide-de-camp to the Governor of Western Australia, William Robinson, from 1894 to 1895. North accompanied Forrest to the Diamond Jubilee of Queen Victoria, and represented Western Australia on the committee welcoming the Duke and Duchess of York to Australia for the opening of the first Federal Parliament in Melbourne. In 1902, North was appointed head of the Colonial Secretary's Department, and he was appointed a Companion of the Order of Saint Michael and Saint George (CMG) in the November 1902 Birthday Honours list.

He served as the president of the Civil Service Association of Western Australia from 1908 to 1911. North was appointed Comptroller-General of Prisons in 1912. North served as the chairman of the Cottesloe Road District from 1906 to 1907 and as mayor of the Municipality of Cottesloe from 1911 to 1916.

North retired from the Civil Service Association in September 1920 due to ill health. North died after he collapsed at the Sea View Golf Club, in August 1921.
