= Thomas Chesson =

Australian trade unionist

Member of the Legislative Assembly of Western Australia
- In office 12 November 1913 – 12 April 1930
- Preceded by: Edward Heitmann
- Succeeded by: None (abolished)
- Constituency: Cue

Personal details
- Born: c. 1867 Adelong, New South Wales, Australia
- Died: 6 May 1943 Perth, Western Australia, Australia
- Party: Labor

Thomas Chesson (c. 1867 – 6 May 1943) was an Australian trade unionist and politician who served as a Labor Party member of the Legislative Assembly of Western Australia from 1913 to 1930, representing the seat of Cue.

Chesson was born in Adelong, New South Wales, to Bridget (née McKay) and John Benjamin Chesson. Arriving in Western Australia in the 1890s, he settled in the inland mining town of Cue, where he worked on the mines. He became prominent in local labour circles, serving as a branch official for various general unions. Chesson entered parliament in November 1913, following the resignation of Edward Heitmann. He was the only candidate at the by-election, and was re-elected unopposed another four times at state elections, only once facing another candidate (at the 1921 election). The seat of Cue was abolished at the 1930 election, and Chesson left parliament. He eventually retired to Perth, dying there in May 1943. Chesson married Kate Martin in 1901, with whom he had six children.

Parliament of Western Australia
Preceded by Edward Heitmann	Member for Cue; 1913–1930	Abolished
