= Tom Harrison (Australian politician) =

Australian politician

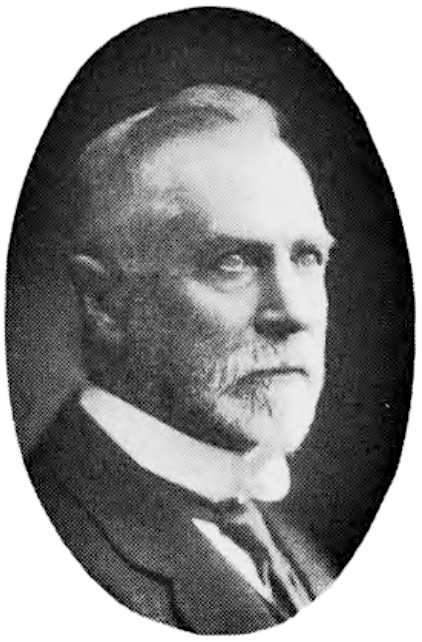

Leader of the Country Party in Western Australia
- In office 30 July 1919 – 30 August 1922
- Deputy: Alfred Piesse; Alec Thomson
- Preceded by: Francis Willmott
- Succeeded by: Henry Maley

Member of the Legislative Assembly of Western Australia
- In office 21 October 1914 – 22 March 1924
- Preceded by: Thomas Bath
- Succeeded by: Harry Griffiths
- Constituency: Avon

Personal details
- Born: 2 April 1864 Brailsford, Derbyshire, England
- Died: 20 June 1944 (aged 80) Kellerberrin, Western Australia, Australia
- Party: Country

Thomas Hamlet Harrison (2 April 1864 – 20 June 1944) was an Australian politician who was a Country Party member of the Legislative Assembly of Western Australia from 1914 to 1924. He was the leader of the Country Party from 1919 to 1922.

== Early life ==
Harrison was born in Brailsford, Derbyshire, England. He emigrated to Australia in 1884, initially settling in Queensland, then moving to Victoria, and finally arriving in Western Australia in the 1890s. Harrison lived in Coolgardie and York for a period, and later became a wheat farmer at Doodlakine. He was elected to the Kellerberrin Road Board in 1911, and served until 1915, including as chairman for a period of time.

== Politics and later life ==
At the 1914 state election, Harrison stood for the newly formed Country Party and was elected to the seat of Avon. He replaced the retiring Labor member, Thomas Bath. In July 1919, following the resignation of Francis Willmott, Harrison was elected leader of the Country Party, which was then in a governing coalition with the Nationalist Party (led by the premier James Mitchell). He continued in the position until August 1922, when he resigned to protest the elevation of a Country MP, Richard Sampson, to cabinet (as Colonial Secretary). Harrison felt that Mitchell had an obligation to consult with him in matters regarding his party's MPs, which he had not fulfilled, and that a more senior member of the party should have received the promotion (Sampson having only been in parliament since the 1921 election).

The Country Party split into two rival factions in 1923, with Harrison joining the Ministerial (or Government) faction, which comprised supporters of the coalition with the Nationalists. At the 1924 state election, he was opposed by Harry Griffiths, a member of the Executive (or Opposition) faction, as well as several other candidates. He was defeated by a large margin, receiving only 18.9 percent of the first-preference vote as Griffiths was elected in his place. After leaving parliament, Harrison returned to his Doodlakine farm. He died in Kellerberrin in June 1944, aged 80.

== See also ==
- Members of the Western Australian Legislative Assembly
