= 1921 Western Australian state election =

- 12 March 1921

All 50 seats in the Western Australian Legislative Assembly
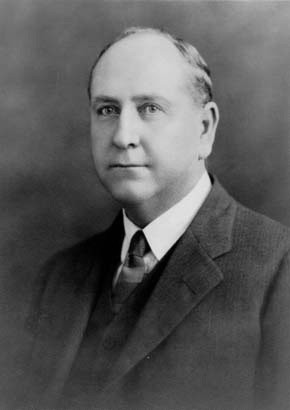

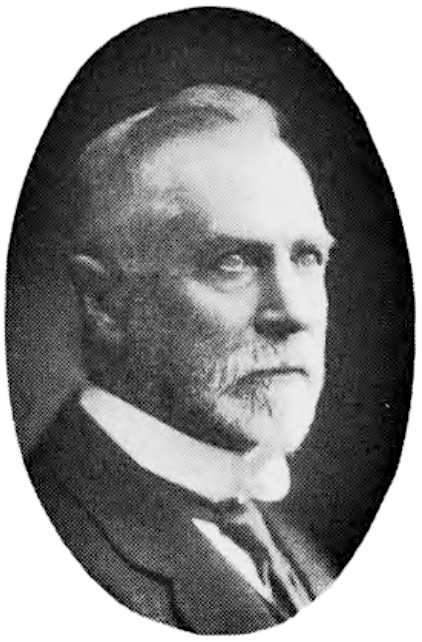

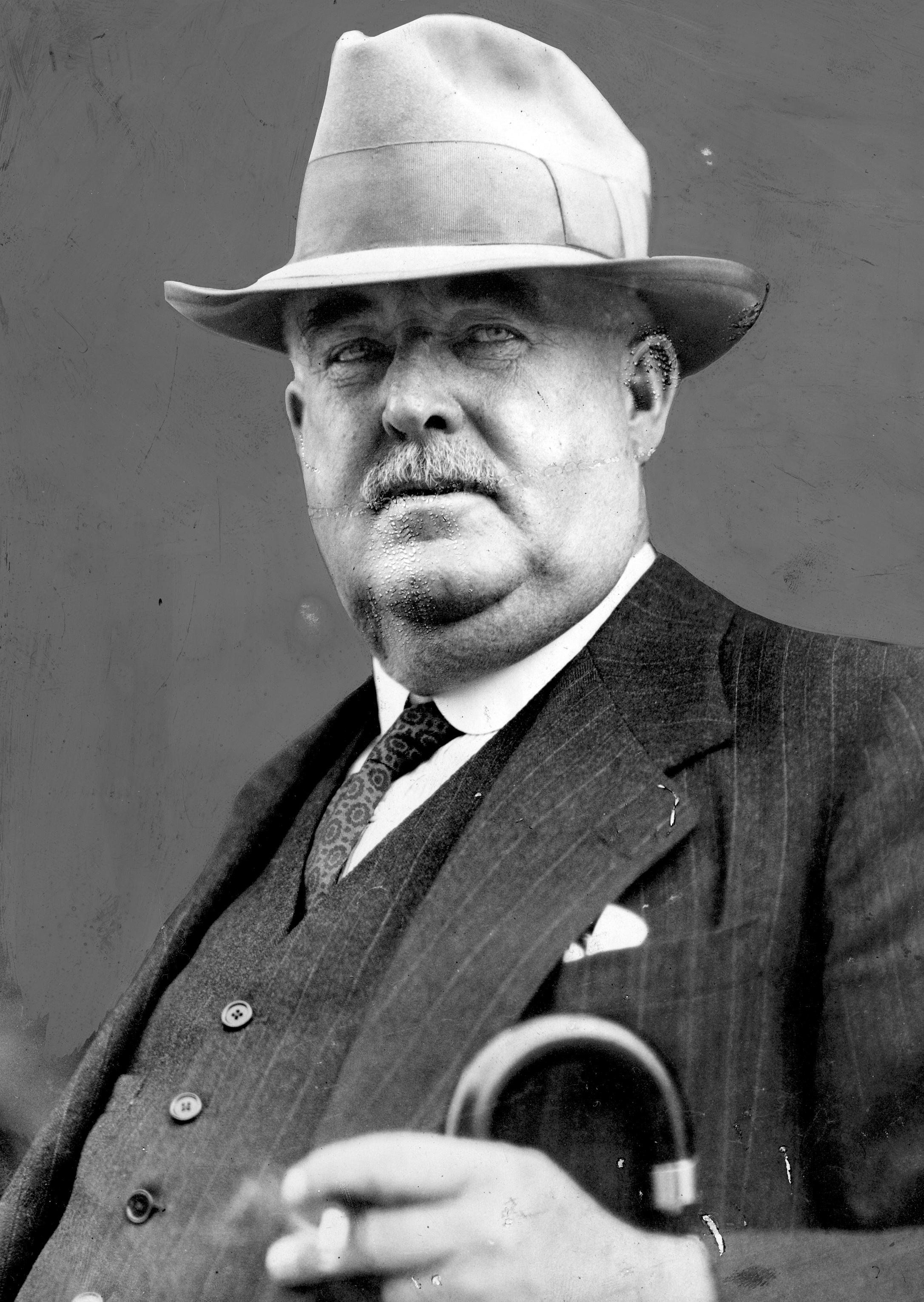
	First party	Second party	Third party
Leader	Philip Collier	Tom Harrison	James Mitchell
Party	Labor	Country	Nationalist
Leader since	16 April 1917	30 July 1919	17 May 1919
Leader's seat	Boulder	Avon	Northam
Last election	15 seats	12 seats	16 seats
Seats won	17 seats	16 seats	10 seats
Seat change	▲2	▲4	▼6
Percentage	36.81%	17.78%	27.73%
Swing	▲11.99	▼1.28	▼7.12
Premier before election
James Mitchell
Nationalist
Elected Premier
James Mitchell
Nationalist

Elections were held in the state of Western Australia on 12 March 1921 to elect all 50 members to the Legislative Assembly. The incumbent government, led by Premier James Mitchell of the Nationalist Party and supported by the Country Party and National Labor Party, won a second term in government against the Labor Party opposition, led by Opposition Leader Philip Collier.

At this election Edith Cowan became the first woman elected to any Australian parliament.

== Results ==
1921 Western Australian state election Legislative Assembly << 1917–1924 >>
Enrolled voters	146,948^{[1]}				
Votes cast	98,958		Turnout	67.34%	+5.19%
Informal votes	1,620		Informal	1.64%	–0.05%
Summary of votes by party
Party	Primary votes	%	Swing	Seats	Change
Labor	35,829	36.81%	+11.99%	17	+ 2
Nationalist	26,995	27.73%	+6.68%	10	+ 2
Country	17,311	17.78%	–1.28%	16	+ 4
National Labor	9,809	10.08%	–6.77%	4	– 2
Independent	7,394	7.60%	+1.86%	3	+ 2
Total	97,338			50	

^{1} 164,688 electors were enrolled to vote at the election, but 6 of the 50 seats were uncontested, with 17,740 electors enrolled in those seats. Of these, 3 were held by Labor, 2 by the Country Party and 1 was held by the National Labor Party.

== See also ==
- Candidates of the 1921 Western Australian state election
- Members of the Western Australian Legislative Assembly, 1917–1921
- Members of the Western Australian Legislative Assembly, 1921–1924
- First Mitchell Ministry
