= John Thomson (Western Australian politician) =

Australian politician

John Thomson (29 May 1865 – 27 February 1947) was an Australian politician. He was the Nationalist member for Claremont in the Western Australian Legislative Assembly from 1921 to 1924, becoming an Independent Nationalist in 1924.
