= Electoral district of Claremont =

Former state electoral district of Western Australia

Claremont Western Australia—Legislative Assembly
- State: Western Australia
- Dates current: 1901–1968
- Namesake: Claremont

Claremont was an electoral district of the Legislative Assembly in the Australian state of Western Australia from 1901 to 1968.

Located in the affluent western suburbs of Perth, it was a safe seat for the Liberal Party and its predecessor parties. Its abolition included Claremont, Mount Claremont, Swanbourne, and the western part of Dalkeith.

It was abolished at the 1968 state election, with its area mostly transferring to Nedlands, and smaller parts to the Electoral district of Cottesloe and the new district of Floreat.

Claremont's most notable member was Charles North, who served as Speaker from 1947 until 1953 during the McLarty–Watts Ministry.

== Members for Claremont ==
Member	Party	Term
William Sayer	Ministerial	1901–1902
John Foulkes	Ministerial	1902–1911
Evan Wisdom	Liberal	1911–1917
John Stewart	Nationalist	1917–1918
Thomas Duff	Nationalist	1918–1921
John Thomson	Nationalist	1921–1924
John Thomson	Ind. Nationalist	1924
Charles North	Nationalist	1924–1945
Charles North	Liberal	1945–1949
Charles North	LCL	1949–1956
Bill Crommelin	LCL	1956–1968
