= 1917 Western Australian state election =

- 29 September 1917

All 50 seats in the Western Australian Legislative Assembly
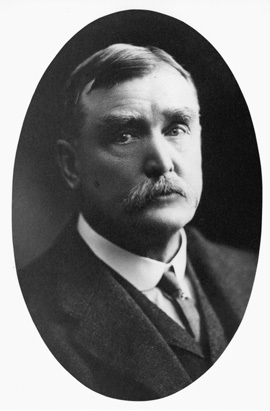

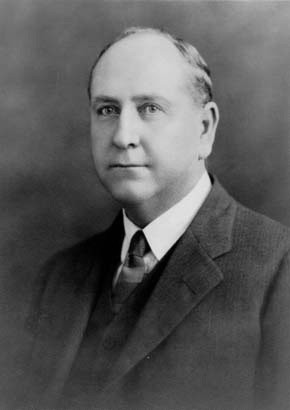
	First party	Second party
Leader	Henry Lefroy	Philip Collier
Party	Nationalist/Country coalition	Labor
Leader since	28 June 1917	16 April 1917
Leader's seat	Moore	Boulder
Seats won	34 seats	15 seats
Seat change	▼2	▲1
Percentage	69.01%	24.79%
Premier before election
Henry Lefroy
Nationalist/Country coalition
Elected Premier
Henry Lefroy
Nationalist/Country coalition

Elections were held in the state of Western Australia on 29 September 1917 to elect 50 members to the Western Australian Legislative Assembly. The Nationalist-Country-National Labor coalition, led by Premier Sir Henry Lefroy, retained government against the Labor Party led by Opposition Leader Philip Collier. The election followed a series of major changes in the Western Australian political landscape.

== Results ==
As the political changes were of a nature which make direct comparison meaningless, no vote swings have been included, and seat swings indicated are those caused by the election itself, rather than a comparison with the previous election. The National Liberal grouping was not a party in its own right, but a faction within the Nationalist Party, so the Nationalist Party as a whole held 16 seats—unchanged from before the election—and attracted 34.85% of the vote.

1917 Western Australian state election Legislative Assembly
Enrolled voters	138,115^{[1]}				
Votes cast	85,620		Turnout	61.99%	+4.67%
Informal votes	1,447		Informal	1.69%	+0.50%
Summary of votes by party
Party	Primary votes	%	Swing	Seats	Change
Labor	20,867	24.79%		15	+ 1
Nationalist	18,087	21.49%		8	+ 3
National Liberal	11,242	13.36%		8	– 3
Country	15,560	18.49%		12	+ 1
National Labor	13,186	15.67%		6	– 3
Independent Labor WA	2,490	2.96%		1	+ 1
Independent	2,709	3.22%		0	± 0
Total	84,173			50	

Notes:

^{1} A total of 167,311 people were enrolled to vote at the election, but 10 of the 50 seats, representing 29,196 voters, were not contested by more than one candidate. Six of these were Labor seats, two were Country Party, one was Nationalist and one was National Labor.

== See also ==
- Members of the Western Australian Legislative Assembly, 1914–1917
- Members of the Western Australian Legislative Assembly, 1917–1921
