= Results of the 1914 Western Australian state election =

Western Australian state election, 21 October 1914 Legislative Assembly << 1911–1917 >>
Enrolled voters	168,546^{[1]}				
Votes cast	96,605		Turnout	57.32	–17.56
Informal votes	1,127		Informal	1.17	–0.24
Summary of votes by party
Party	Primary votes	%	Swing	Seats	Change
Labor	40,205	42.12	–10.42	26^{[1]}	– 8
Liberal	41,929	43.91	–0.89	16	± 0
Country	13,344	13.98	+13.98	8	+ 8
Total	95,478			50	

This is a list of electoral district results of the 1914 Western Australian election.

== Results by electoral district ==
=== Albany ===
1914 Western Australian state election: Albany
Party	Candidate	Votes	%	±%
Labor	William Price	1,560	51.0	−4.1
Liberal	Ernest McKenzie	1,497	49.0	+25.6
Total formal votes		2,705	99.3	+0.7
Informal votes		21	0.7	−0.7
Turnout		3,078	66.2	−17.7
Labor hold		Swing	N/A	

=== Avon ===
1914 Western Australian state election: Avon
Party	Candidate	Votes	%	±%
Country	Tom Harrison	1,318	54.3	+54.3
Labor	Fred Membrey	1,110	45.7	−7.1
Total formal votes		2,428	99.7	+0.1
Informal votes		8	0.3	−0.1
Turnout		2,436	57.7	+12.1
Country gain from Labor		Swing	N/A	

=== Beverley ===
1914 Western Australian state election: Beverley
Party	Candidate	Votes	%	±%
Country	Charles Wansbrough	809	60.4	+60.4
Labor	Charles Kirkwood	289	21.6	+8.2
Liberal	Richard White	242	18.1	−35.5
Total formal votes		1,340	98.7	+0.1
Informal votes		17	1.3	−0.1
Turnout		1,357	56.9	−11.5
Country gain from Liberal		Swing	N/A	

=== Boulder ===
1914 Western Australian state election: Boulder
Party	Candidate	Votes	%	±%
Labor	Philip Collier	unopposed		
Labor hold		Swing		

=== Brownhill-Ivanhoe ===
1914 Western Australian state election: Brownhill-Ivanhoe
Party	Candidate	Votes	%	±%
Labor	John Scaddan	unopposed		
Labor hold		Swing		

=== Bunbury ===
1914 Western Australian state election: Bunbury
Party	Candidate	Votes	%	±%
Labor	William Thomas	1,397	51.6	−3.3
Liberal	Griffin Money	1,309	48.4	+3.3
Total formal votes		2,706	99.4	−0.3
Informal votes		16	0.6	+0.3
Turnout		2,722	68.0	−24.0
Labor hold		Swing	−3.3	

=== Canning ===
1914 Western Australian state election: Canning
Party	Candidate	Votes	%	±%
Labor	Charles Lewis	2,365	46.1	−6.1
Liberal	Robert Robinson	1,578	30.7	+12.5
Liberal	George Wilson	841	16.4	+1.1
Liberal	Arthur Gull	347	6.8	+6.8
Total formal votes		5,131	99.0	−0.1
Informal votes		54	1.0	+0.1
Turnout		5,185	66.7	−15.0
Two-party-preferred result
Liberal	Robert Robinson	2,624	51.1	
Labor	Charles Lewis	2,507	48.9	
Liberal gain from Labor		Swing	N/A	

=== Claremont ===
1914 Western Australian state election: Claremont
Party	Candidate	Votes	%	±%
Liberal	Evan Wisdom	2,261	57.0	+28.4
Liberal	Joseph Langsford	1,705	43.0	+16.5
Total formal votes		3,966	99.6	+0.3
Informal votes		15	0.4	−0.3
Turnout		3,981	55.2	−28.3
Liberal hold		Swing	N/A	

=== Collie ===
1914 Western Australian state election: Collie
Party	Candidate	Votes	%	±%
Labor	Arthur Wilson	1,632	70.4	−29.6
Liberal	Herbert Wells	685	29.6	+29.6
Total formal votes		2,317	99.1	
Informal votes		21	0.9	
Turnout		2,338	46.8	
Labor hold		Swing	N/A	

=== Coolgardie ===
1914 Western Australian state election: Coolgardie
Party	Candidate	Votes	%	±%
Labor	Charles McDowall	unopposed		
Labor hold		Swing		

=== Cue ===
1914 Western Australian state election: Cue
Party	Candidate	Votes	%	±%
Labor	Thomas Chesson	unopposed		
Labor hold		Swing		

=== East Perth ===
1914 Western Australian state election: East Perth
Party	Candidate	Votes	%	±%
Labor	Titus Lander	1,949	44.3	−18.1
Liberal	Lewis Butt	812	18.4	+18.4
Liberal	John Hardwick	773	17.6	+17.6
Liberal	Henry Mills	647	14.7	−22.9
Liberal	Albert Keeley	221	5.0	+5.0
Total formal votes		4,402	98.1	−0.6
Informal votes		87	1.9	+0.6
Turnout		4,489	49.9	−24.0
Two-party-preferred result
Liberal	John Hardwick	2,321	52.7	+15.1
Labor	Titus Lander	2,081	47.3	−15.1
Liberal gain from Labor		Swing	+15.1	

=== Forrest ===
1914 Western Australian state election: Forrest
Party	Candidate	Votes	%	±%
Labor	Peter O'Loghlen	unopposed		
Labor hold		Swing		

=== Fremantle ===
1914 Western Australian state election: Fremantle
Party	Candidate	Votes	%	±%
Labor	William Carpenter	1,716	53.8	−6.9
Liberal	John Stewart	938	29.4	−9.9
Liberal	Frederick McLaren	537	16.8	+16.8
Total formal votes		3,191	97.3	−1.3
Informal votes		90	2.7	+1.3
Turnout		3,281	58.6	−22.3
Labor hold		Swing	N/A	

- Preferences were not distributed.

=== Gascoyne ===
1914 Western Australian state election: Gascoyne
Party	Candidate	Votes	%	±%
Liberal	Archibald Gilchrist	435	59.7	+13.3
Labor	Edward Pearson	294	40.3	−13.3
Total formal votes		729	99.6	+0.2
Informal votes		3	0.4	−0.2
Turnout		732	63.4	+14.9
Liberal gain from Labor		Swing	+13.3	

=== Geraldton ===
1914 Western Australian state election: Geraldton
Party	Candidate	Votes	%	±%
Labor	Edward Heitmann	1,370	56.4	+11.2
Liberal	Samuel Elliott	1,060	43.6	+6.9
Total formal votes		2,430	99.0	+0.3
Informal votes		25	1.0	−0.3
Turnout		2,455	63.3	−16.3
Labor hold		Swing	+3.8	

=== Greenough ===
1914 Western Australian state election: Greenough
Party	Candidate	Votes	%	±%
Country	John Cunningham	986	77.0	+77.0
Liberal	Ernest Udy	294	23.0	−28.0
Total formal votes		1,280	98.8	−0.6
Informal votes		16	1.2	+0.6
Turnout		1,296	36.9	−33.6
Country gain from Liberal		Swing	N/A	

=== Guildford ===
1914 Western Australian state election: Guildford
Party	Candidate	Votes	%	±%
Labor	William Johnson	3,119	69.5	+2.8
Liberal	Harold Tuckfield	1,372	30.5	+13.8
Total formal votes		4,491	99.0	+0.3
Informal votes		46	1.0	−0.3
Turnout		4,537	54.8	−27.8
Labor hold		Swing	N/A	

=== Hannans ===
1914 Western Australian state election: Hannans
Party	Candidate	Votes	%	±%
Labor	Selby Munsie	unopposed		
Labor hold		Swing		

=== Irwin ===
1914 Western Australian state election: Irwin
Party	Candidate	Votes	%	±%
Country	James Gardiner	728	59.7	+59.7
Liberal	Samuel Moore	492	40.3	−2.7
Total formal votes		1,220	99.8	+1.0
Informal votes		2	0.2	−1.0
Turnout		1,222	44.2	−25.3
Country gain from Liberal		Swing	N/A	

=== Kalgoorlie ===
1914 Western Australian state election: Kalgoorlie
Party	Candidate	Votes	%	±%
Labor	Albert Green	unopposed		
Labor hold		Swing		

=== Kanowna ===
1914 Western Australian state election: Kanowna
Party	Candidate	Votes	%	±%
Labor	Thomas Walker	unopposed		
Labor hold		Swing		

=== Katanning ===
1914 Western Australian state election: Katanning
Party	Candidate	Votes	%	±%
Liberal	Alec Thomson	1,226	55.8	−21.6
Country	Norman Macrae	969	44.2	+44.2
Total formal votes		2,195	99.9	+0.6
Informal votes		3	0.1	−0.6
Turnout		2,198	53.4	−15.5
Liberal hold		Swing	N/A	

=== Kimberley ===
1914 Western Australian state election: Kimberley
Party	Candidate	Votes	%	±%
Liberal	Arthur Male	unopposed		
Liberal hold		Swing		

=== Leederville ===
1914 Western Australian state election: Leederville
Party	Candidate	Votes	%	±%
Labor	Frederick Gill	2,326	46.9	−11.0
Liberal	John Veryard	1,480	29.8	+2.9
Liberal	Osmond Fry	1,153	23.2	+23.2
Total formal votes		4,959	98.3	+1.4
Informal votes		86	1.7	−1.4
Turnout		5,045	57.0	−24.7
Two-party-preferred result
Liberal	John Veryard	2,520	50.8	
Labor	Frederick Gill	2,439	49.2	
Liberal gain from Labor		Swing	N/A	

=== Menzies ===
1914 Western Australian state election: Menzies
Party	Candidate	Votes	%	±%
Labor	John Mullany	600	69.2	+4.3
Liberal	William McMeikan	267	30.8	−4.3
Total formal votes		867	99.2	−0.4
Informal votes		7	0.8	+0.4
Turnout		874	64.9	−22.6
Labor hold		Swing	+4.3	

=== Moore ===
1914 Western Australian state election: Moore
Party	Candidate	Votes	%	±%
Liberal	Henry Lefroy	687	53.0	+19.1
Country	Duncan Munro	609	47.0	+47.0
Total formal votes		1,296	99.7	+1.6
Informal votes		4	0.3	−1.6
Turnout		1,300	37.9	−25.4
Liberal hold		Swing	N/A	

=== Mount Leonora ===
1914 Western Australian state election: Mount Leonora
Party	Candidate	Votes	%	±%
Labor	George Foley	unopposed		
Labor hold		Swing		

=== Mount Magnet ===
1914 Western Australian state election: Mount Magnet
Party	Candidate	Votes	%	±%
Labor	Michael Troy	unopposed		
Labor hold		Swing		

=== Mount Margaret ===
1914 Western Australian state election: Mount Margaret
Party	Candidate	Votes	%	±%
Labor	George Taylor	unopposed		
Labor hold		Swing		

=== Murchison ===
1914 Western Australian state election: Murchison
Party	Candidate	Votes	%	±%
Labor	John Holman	unopposed		
Labor hold		Swing		

=== Murray-Wellington ===
1914 Western Australian state election: Murray-Wellington
Party	Candidate	Votes	%	±%
Liberal	William George	1,381	71.5	+21.3
Labor	James Shanahan	550	28.5	−7.6
Total formal votes		1,931	99.4	+0.3
Informal votes		11	0.6	−0.3
Turnout		1,942	64.6	−12.3
Liberal hold		Swing	N/A	

=== Nelson ===
1914 Western Australian state election: Nelson
Party	Candidate	Votes	%	±%
Country	Francis Willmott	1,593	54.2	+54.2
Labor	Roger Ryan	1,347	45.8	−2.2
Total formal votes		2,940	99.4	+0.1
Informal votes		19	0.6	−0.1
Turnout		2,959	68.6	−7.6
Country gain from Liberal		Swing	N/A	

=== North Perth ===
1914 Western Australian state election: North Perth
Party	Candidate	Votes	%	±%
Liberal	James Smith	1,835	38.9	+12.9
Labor	Herbert Swan	993	21.1	−35.3
Labor	Sidney Gibson	643	13.7	+13.7
Liberal	James George	456	9.7	+9.7
Labor	Peter Wedd	366	7.8	+7.8
Liberal	Arthur Wasley	242	5.1	+5.1
Liberal	Charles Galwey	176	3.7	+3.7
Total formal votes		4,711	95.9	−3.0
Informal votes		203	4.1	+3.0
Turnout		4,914	57.1	−26.3
After distribution of preferences
Liberal	James Smith	2,595	55.1	
Labor	Herbert Swan	1,202	25.5	
Labor	Sidney Gibson	914	19.4	
Liberal gain from Labor		Swing	N/A	

- Preferences were not distributed to completion.

=== North-East Fremantle ===
1914 Western Australian state election: North-East Fremantle
Party	Candidate	Votes	%	±%
Labor	William Angwin	2,784	68.8	−5.9
Liberal	Samuel Thomson	1,260	31.2	+12.4
Total formal votes		4,044	99.3	+0.4
Informal votes		27	0.7	−0.4
Turnout		4,071	63.0	−23.9
Labor hold		Swing	N/A	

=== Northam ===
1914 Western Australian state election: Northam
Party	Candidate	Votes	%	±%
Liberal	James Mitchell	1,085	50.9	−0.1
Labor	James Kenneally	878	41.2	−7.8
Country	Oscar Bernard	167	7.8	+7.8
Total formal votes		2,130	98.4	−0.9
Informal votes		35	1.6	+0.9
Turnout		2,165	66.1	−5.9
Liberal hold		Swing	N/A	

- Preferences were not distributed.

=== Perth ===
1914 Western Australian state election: Perth
Party	Candidate	Votes	%	±%
Labor	Walter Dwyer	1,507	43.0	−10.3
Liberal	James Connolly	1,340	38.2	−8.5
Liberal	Arthur Berryman	661	18.8	+18.8
Total formal votes		3,508	97.9	−0.8
Informal votes		76	2.1	+0.8
Turnout		3,584	41.8	−36.9
Two-party-preferred result
Liberal	James Connolly	1,941	55.3	+8.6
Labor	Walter Dwyer	1,567	44.7	−8.6
Liberal gain from Labor		Swing	+8.6	

=== Pilbara ===
1914 Western Australian state election: Pilbara
Party	Candidate	Votes	%	±%
Labor	Henry Underwood	352	52.9	−1.1
Liberal	Michael Corbett	314	47.1	+1.1
Total formal votes		666	99.7	+0.9
Informal votes		2	0.3	−0.9
Turnout		668	66.5	−1.9
Labor hold		Swing	−1.1	

=== Pingelly ===
1914 Western Australian state election: Pingelly
Party	Candidate	Votes	%	±%
Country	Henry Hickmott	889	57.5	+57.5
Liberal	Nat Harper	657	42.5	−22.7
Total formal votes		1,546	97.9	−1.2
Informal votes		33	2.1	+1.2
Turnout		1,579	57.2	−15.8
Country gain from Liberal		Swing	N/A	

=== Roebourne ===
1914 Western Australian state election: Roebourne
Party	Candidate	Votes	%	±%
Labor	Joseph Gardiner	324	54.4	−11.9
Liberal	Frederick Teesdale	272	45.6	+28.6
Total formal votes		596	97.5	+1.7
Informal votes		15	2.5	−1.7
Turnout		611	54.1	−0.4
Labor hold		Swing	N/A	

=== South Fremantle ===
1914 Western Australian state election: South Fremantle
Party	Candidate	Votes	%	±%
Labor	Harry Bolton	2,018	55.8	−11.0
Liberal	William Watson	1,600	44.2	+14.8
Total formal votes		3,618	99.6	+0.8
Informal votes		16	0.4	−0.8
Turnout		3,634	65.6	−17.7
Labor hold		Swing	N/A	

=== Subiaco ===
1914 Western Australian state election: Subiaco
Party	Candidate	Votes	%	±%
Labor	Bartholomew Stubbs	2,763	50.4	−0.4
Liberal	Henry Daglish	2,717	49.6	+0.4
Total formal votes		5,480	99.5	+7.5
Informal votes		29	0.5	−7.5
Turnout		5,509	63.6	−14.8
Labor hold		Swing	−0.4	

=== Sussex ===
1914 Western Australian state election: Sussex
Party	Candidate	Votes	%	±%
Liberal	Frank Wilson	763	43.4	−16.2
Labor	John Blair	709	40.4	0.0
Country	William Pickering	285	16.2	+16.2
Total formal votes		1,757	98.0	−1.5
Informal votes		36	2.0	+1.5
Turnout		1,793	66.6	−3.8
Two-party-preferred result
Liberal	Frank Wilson	999	56.9	−2.7
Labor	John Blair	758	43.1	+2.7
Liberal hold		Swing	−2.7	

=== Swan ===
1914 Western Australian state election: Swan
Party	Candidate	Votes	%	±%
Labor	Philip Turvey	1,186	44.3	−6.9
Liberal	William Nairn	1,100	41.1	−7.7
Independent	Thomas Ilbery	392	14.6	+14.6
Total formal votes		2,678	98.4	−1.2
Informal votes		44	1.6	+1.2
Turnout		2,722	67.5	−10.3
Two-party-preferred result
Liberal	William Nairn	1,433	53.5	+4.7
Labor	Philip Turvey	1,245	46.5	−4.7
Liberal gain from Labor		Swing	+4.7	

=== Toodyay ===
1914 Western Australian state election: Toodyay
Party	Candidate	Votes	%	±%
Country	Alfred Piesse	unopposed		
Country gain from Liberal		Swing	N/A	

=== Wagin ===
1914 Western Australian state election: Wagin
Party	Candidate	Votes	%	±%
Liberal	Sydney Stubbs	1,071	53.0	−15.7
Country	Ernest Absolon	948	47.0	+47.0
Total formal votes		2,019	99.4	+1.0
Informal votes		12	0.6	−1.0
Turnout		2,031	66.6	−6.7
Liberal hold		Swing	N/A	

=== West Perth ===
1914 Western Australian state election: West Perth
Party	Candidate	Votes	%	±%
Liberal	Eben Allen	2,288	63.6	+30.2
Labor	James Doland	1,308	36.4	−7.6
Total formal votes		3,596	99.7	+1.1
Informal votes		9	0.3	−1.1
Turnout		3,605	48.3	−33.9
Liberal hold		Swing	+9.1	

=== Williams-Narrogin ===
1914 Western Australian state election: Williams-Narrogin
Party	Candidate	Votes	%	±%
Labor	Edward Johnston	1,947	65.2	+11.0
Country	Solomon Fisher	1,038	34.8	+34.8
Total formal votes		2,985	99.4	+0.9
Informal votes		19	0.6	−0.9
Turnout		3,004	62.1	−15.7
Labor hold		Swing	N/A	

=== Yilgarn ===
1914 Western Australian state election: Yilgarn
Party	Candidate	Votes	%	±%
Labor	Charles Hudson	803	60.6	−2.0
Liberal	Archibald McIntyre	523	39.4	+39.4
Total formal votes		1,326	99.0	−0.8
Informal votes		13	1.0	+0.8
Turnout		1,339	64.2	−2.8
Labor hold		Swing	N/A	

=== York ===
1914 Western Australian state election: York
Party	Candidate	Votes	%	±%
Country	Harry Griffiths	1,116	57.5	+57.5
Liberal	Frederick Monger	826	42.5	−4.0
Total formal votes		1,942	99.6	+1.4
Informal votes		7	0.4	−1.4
Turnout		1,949	50.4	−14.1
Country gain from Liberal		Swing	N/A	

== See also ==
- 1914 Western Australian state election
- Members of the Western Australian Legislative Assembly, 1914–1917
