= Results of the 1911 Western Australian state election =

Western Australian state election, 3 October 1911 Legislative Assembly << 1908–1914 >>
Enrolled voters	122,375^{[1]}				
Votes cast	91,630		Turnout	74.88	+8.48
Informal votes	1,287		Informal	1.40	+0.19
Summary of votes by party
Party	Primary votes	%	Swing	Seats	Change
Labor	47,558	52.64	+14.73	34^{[1]}	+ 12
Ministerialist	40,472	44.80	–16.82	16	– 12
Independent	2,313	2.56	+2.09	0	± 0
Total	90,343			50	

This is a list of electoral district results of the 1911 Western Australian election.

== Results by electoral district ==
=== Albany ===
1911 Western Australian state election: Albany
Party	Candidate	Votes	%	±%
Labor	William Price	1,490	55.1	
Ministerialist	Ernest McKenzie	633	23.4	
Ministerialist	William Mawson	376	13.9	
Ministerialist	Alec Thomson	119	4.4	
Independent	John Parks	87	3.2	
Total formal votes		2,705	98.6	
Informal votes		37	1.4	
Turnout		2,742	83.9	
Labor hold		Swing		

- Preferences were not distributed.

=== Avon ===
1911 Western Australian state election: Avon
Party	Candidate	Votes	%	±%
Labor	Thomas Bath	1,155	52.8	
Ministerialist	Hal Colebatch	1,032	47.2	
Total formal votes		2,187	99.6	
Informal votes		8	0.4	
Turnout		2,195	69.8	
Labor hold		Swing		

=== Beverley ===
1911 Western Australian state election: Beverley
Party	Candidate	Votes	%	±%
Ministerialist	Frank Broun	617	53.6	
Labor	Charles Kirkwood	343	29.8	
Ministerialist	William Brown	99	8.6	
Ministerialist	Edward Powell	92	8.0	
Total formal votes		1,151	98.6	
Informal votes		16	1.4	
Turnout		1,167	68.4	
Ministerialist hold		Swing		

- Preferences were not distributed.

=== Boulder ===
1911 Western Australian state election: Boulder
Party	Candidate	Votes	%	±%
Labor	Philip Collier	unopposed		
Labor hold		Swing		

=== Brownhill-Ivanhoe ===
1911 Western Australian state election: Brownhill-Ivanhoe
Party	Candidate	Votes	%	±%
Labor	John Scaddan	unopposed		
Labor hold		Swing		

=== Bunbury ===
1911 Western Australian state election: Bunbury
Party	Candidate	Votes	%	±%
Labor	William Thomas	1,420	54.9	
Ministerialist	John Ewing	1,169	45.1	
Total formal votes		2,589	99.7	
Informal votes		8	0.3	
Turnout		2,597	92.0	
Labor gain from Ministerialist		Swing	N/A	

=== Canning ===
1911 Western Australian state election: Canning
Party	Candidate	Votes	%	±%
Labor	Charles Lewis	1,711	52.2	
Ministerialist	Hugh Duncan	597	18.2	
Ministerialist	George Wilson	502	15.3	
Ministerialist	William Gordon	299	9.1	
Ministerialist	Robert McMasters	168	5.1	
Total formal votes		3,277	99.1	
Informal votes		29	0.9	
Turnout		3,306	81.7	
Labor gain from Ministerialist		Swing		

- Preferences were not distributed.

=== Claremont ===
1911 Western Australian state election: Claremont
Party	Candidate	Votes	%	±%
Labor	Reginald Burchell	1,648	44.9	
Ministerialist	Evan Wisdom	1,050	28.6	
Ministerialist	Joseph Langsford	975	26.5	
Total formal votes		3,673	99.3	
Informal votes		24	0.7	
Turnout		3,697	83.5	
Two-party-preferred result
Ministerialist	Evan Wisdom	1,867	50.8	
Labor	Reginald Burchell	1,806	49.2	
Ministerialist hold		Swing		

=== Collie ===
1911 Western Australian state election: Collie
Party	Candidate	Votes	%	±%
Labor	Arthur Wilson	unopposed		
Labor hold		Swing		

=== Coolgardie ===
1911 Western Australian state election: Coolgardie
Party	Candidate	Votes	%	±%
Labor	Charles McDowall	1,348	62.7	
Independent	Henry Ellis	802	37.3	
Total formal votes		2,150	99.6	
Informal votes		9	0.4	
Turnout		2,159	71.9	
Labor hold		Swing		

=== Cue ===
1911 Western Australian state election: Cue
Party	Candidate	Votes	%	±%
Labor	Edward Heitmann	unopposed		
Labor hold		Swing		

=== East Perth ===
1911 Western Australian state election: East Perth
Party	Candidate	Votes	%	±%
Labor	Titus Lander	2,282	62.4	
Ministerialist	Henry Mills	1,375	37.6	
Total formal votes		3,657	98.7	
Informal votes		47	1.3	
Turnout		3,704	73.9	
Labor gain from Ministerialist		Swing		

=== Forrest ===
1911 Western Australian state election: Forrest
Party	Candidate	Votes	%	±%
Labor	Peter O'Loghlen	unopposed		
Labor hold		Swing		

=== Fremantle ===
1911 Western Australian state election: Fremantle
Party	Candidate	Votes	%	±%
Labor	William Carpenter	1,716	60.7	
Ministerialist	William Murphy	1,110	39.3	
Total formal votes		2,826	98.6	
Informal votes		40	1.4	
Turnout		2,866	80.9	
Labor gain from Ministerialist		Swing		

=== Gascoyne ===
1911 Western Australian state election: Gascoyne
Party	Candidate	Votes	%	±%
Labor	John McDonald	468	53.6	
Ministerialist	William Butcher	405	46.4	
Total formal votes		873	99.4	
Informal votes		5	0.6	
Turnout		878	48.5	
Labor gain from Ministerialist		Swing		

=== Geraldton ===
1911 Western Australian state election: Geraldton
Party	Candidate	Votes	%	±%
Labor	Bronte Dooley	864	45.2	
Ministerialist	Henry Carson	702	36.7	
Ministerialist	Patrick Stone	252	13.2	
Labor	William Findlay	92	4.8	
Total formal votes		1,910	98.7	
Informal votes		25	1.3	
Turnout		1,935	79.6	
Two-party-preferred result
Labor	Bronte Dooley	1,005	52.6	
Ministerialist	Henry Carson	905	47.4	
Labor gain from Ministerialist		Swing		

=== Greenough ===
1911 Western Australian state election: Greenough
Party	Candidate	Votes	%	±%
Ministerialist	John Nanson	721	51.0	
Labor	Sydney Hosken	693	49.0	
Total formal votes		1,414	99.4	
Informal votes		9	0.6	
Turnout		1,423	70.5	
Ministerialist hold		Swing		

=== Guildford ===
1911 Western Australian state election: Guildford
Party	Candidate	Votes	%	±%
Labor	William Johnson	2,682	66.7	
Ministerialist	Frederick Percy	672	16.7	
Ministerialist	Percival Robinson	554	13.8	
Ministerialist	Peter Gugeri	114	2.8	
Total formal votes		4,022	98.7	
Informal votes		51	1.3	
Turnout		4,073	82.6	
Labor hold		Swing		

- Preferences were not distributed.

=== Hannans ===
1911 Western Australian state election: Hannans
Party	Candidate	Votes	%	±%
Labor	Selby Munsie	unopposed		
Labor hold		Swing		

=== Irwin ===
1911 Western Australian state election: Irwin
Party	Candidate	Votes	%	±%
Ministerialist	Samuel Moore	479	43.0	
Ministerialist	James Gardiner	370	33.2	
Labor	Archibald McDonald	265	23.8	
Total formal votes		1,114	98.8	
Informal votes		14	1.2	
Turnout		1,128	69.5	
Two-candidate-preferred result
Ministerialist	Samuel Moore	586	52.6	
Ministerialist	James Gardiner	528	47.4	
Ministerialist hold		Swing		

=== Kalgoorlie ===
1911 Western Australian state election: Kalgoorlie
Party	Candidate	Votes	%	±%
Labor	Albert Green	2,510	86.6	
Independent	Mathias Richardson	389	13.4	
Total formal votes		2,899	99.2	
Informal votes		22	0.8	
Turnout		2,921	60.2	
Labor gain from Ministerialist		Swing		

=== Kanowna ===
1911 Western Australian state election: Kanowna
Party	Candidate	Votes	%	±%
Labor	Thomas Walker	unopposed		
Labor hold		Swing		

=== Katanning ===
1911 Western Australian state election: Katanning
Party	Candidate	Votes	%	±%
Ministerialist	Arnold Piesse	1,310	77.4	
Independent	George Irving	382	22.6	
Total formal votes		1,692	99.3	
Informal votes		12	0.7	
Turnout		1,704	68.9	
Ministerialist hold		Swing		

=== Kimberley ===
1911 Western Australian state election: Kimberley
Party	Candidate	Votes	%	±%
Ministerialist	Arthur Male	418	59.3	
Labor	Thomas Brown	287	40.7	
Total formal votes		705	98.0	
Informal votes		14	2.0	
Turnout		719	41.7	
Ministerialist hold		Swing		

=== Leederville ===
1911 Western Australian state election: Leederville
Party	Candidate	Votes	%	±%
Labor	Frederick Gill	2,192	57.9	
Ministerialist	John Veryard	1,019	26.9	
Ministerialist	William Mitchell	531	14.0	
Ministerialist	Joseph Elliott	43	1.1	
Total formal votes		3,785	96.9	
Informal votes		119	3.1	
Turnout		3,904	81.7	
Labor hold		Swing		

- Preferences were not distributed.

=== Menzies ===
1911 Western Australian state election: Menzies
Party	Candidate	Votes	%	±%
Labor	John Mullany	941	64.9	
Ministerialist	Henry Gregory	509	35.1	
Total formal votes		1,450	99.6	
Informal votes		6	0.4	
Turnout		1,456	87.5	
Labor gain from Ministerialist		Swing		

=== Moore ===
1911 Western Australian state election: Moore
Party	Candidate	Votes	%	±%
Ministerialist	Henry Lefroy	511	33.9	
Labor	Thomas Clune	412	27.4	
Ministerialist	Duncan Munro	209	13.9	
Ministerialist	James Spiers	160	10.6	
Ministerialist	James Huggins	155	10.3	
Ministerialist	John O'Neil	59	3.9	
Total formal votes		1,506	98.1	
Informal votes		29	1.9	
Turnout		1,535	63.3	
Two-party-preferred result
Ministerialist	Henry Lefroy	992	65.9	
Labor	Thomas Clune	514	34.1	
Ministerialist hold		Swing		

=== Mount Leonora ===
1911 Western Australian state election: Mount Leonora
Party	Candidate	Votes	%	±%
Labor	George Foley	1,019	87.0	
Ministerialist	Arthur Court	153	13.0	
Total formal votes		1,172	99.3	
Informal votes		8	0.7	
Turnout		1,180	48.2	
Labor hold		Swing		

=== Mount Magnet ===
1911 Western Australian state election: Mount Magnet
Party	Candidate	Votes	%	±%
Labor	Michael Troy	unopposed		
Labor hold		Swing		

=== Mount Margaret ===
1911 Western Australian state election: Mount Margaret
Party	Candidate	Votes	%	±%
Labor	George Taylor	unopposed		
Labor hold		Swing		

=== Murchison ===
1911 Western Australian state election: Murchison
Party	Candidate	Votes	%	±%
Labor	John Holman	unopposed		
Labor hold		Swing		

=== Murray-Wellington ===
1911 Western Australian state election: Murray-Wellington
Party	Candidate	Votes	%	±%
Ministerialist	William George	843	50.2	
Labor	Victor Urquhart	606	36.1	
Ministerialist	Charles Heppingstone	231	13.7	
Total formal votes		1,680	99.1	
Informal votes		16	0.9	
Turnout		1,696	76.9	
Ministerialist hold		Swing		

=== Nelson ===
1911 Western Australian state election: Nelson
Party	Candidate	Votes	%	±%
Ministerialist	Charles Layman	1,113	49.8	
Labor	William Johnston	1,073	48.0	
Ministerialist	Robert Uphill	48	2.2	
Total formal votes		2,234	99.3	
Informal votes		16	0.7	
Turnout		2,250	76.2	
Two-party-preferred result
Ministerialist	Charles Layman	1,144	51.2	
Labor	William Johnston	1,090	48.8	
Ministerialist hold		Swing		

=== North Perth ===
1911 Western Australian state election: North Perth
Party	Candidate	Votes	%	±%
Labor	Herbert Swan	2,435	56.4	
Ministerialist	Walter Nairn	1,125	26.0	
Ministerialist	James Franklin	758	17.6	
Total formal votes		4,318	98.9	
Informal votes		49	1.1	
Turnout		4,367	83.4	
Labor hold		Swing		

- Preferences were not distributed.

=== North-East Fremantle ===
1911 Western Australian state election: North-East Fremantle
Party	Candidate	Votes	%	±%
Labor	William Angwin	2,593	74.7	
Ministerialist	Patrick Hevron	652	18.8	
Ministerialist	Dixon Hearder	227	6.5	
Total formal votes		3,472	98.9	
Informal votes		37	1.1	
Turnout		3,509	86.9	
Labor hold		Swing		

- Preferences were not distributed.

=== Northam ===
1911 Western Australian state election: Northam
Party	Candidate	Votes	%	±%
Ministerialist	James Mitchell	1,037	51.0	
Labor	Alfred Watts	995	49.0	
Total formal votes		2,032	99.3	
Informal votes		14	0.7	
Turnout		2,046	72.0	
Ministerialist hold		Swing		

=== Perth ===
1911 Western Australian state election: Perth
Party	Candidate	Votes	%	±%
Labor	Walter Dwyer	1,932	53.3	
Ministerialist	Harry Brown	1,692	46.7	
Total formal votes		3,624	98.3	
Informal votes		47	1.3	
Turnout		3,671	78.7	
Labor gain from Ministerialist		Swing		

=== Pilbara ===
1911 Western Australian state election: Pilbara
Party	Candidate	Votes	%	±%
Labor	Henry Underwood	413	54.0	
Ministerialist	George Miles	352	46.0	
Total formal votes		765	98.8	
Informal votes		9	1.2	
Turnout		774	68.4	
Labor hold		Swing		

=== Pingelly ===
1911 Western Australian state election: Pingelly
Party	Candidate	Votes	%	±%
Ministerialist	Nat Harper	1,034	65.2	
Labor	Matthew Bodey	552	34.8	
Total formal votes		1,586	99.1	
Informal votes		15	0.9	
Turnout		1,601	73.0	
Ministerialist hold		Swing		

=== Roebourne ===
1911 Western Australian state election: Roebourne
Party	Candidate	Votes	%	±%
Labor	Joseph Gardiner	379	66.3	
Ministerialist	Albert Wilson	97	17.0	
Ministerialist	Henry Osborn	96	16.8	
Total formal votes		572	95.8	
Informal votes		25	4.2	
Turnout		597	54.5	
Labor gain from Ministerialist		Swing		

- Preferences were not distributed.

=== South Fremantle ===
1911 Western Australian state election: South Fremantle
Party	Candidate	Votes	%	±%
Labor	Harry Bolton	2,113	66.8	
Ministerialist	John Cooke	929	29.4	
Ministerialist	John Brennan	121	3.8	
Total formal votes		3,163	98.8	
Informal votes		38	1.2	
Turnout		3,201	83.3	
Labor gain from Ministerialist		Swing		

- Preferences were not distributed.

=== Subiaco ===
1911 Western Australian state election: Subiaco
Party	Candidate	Votes	%	±%
Labor	Bartholomew Stubbs	1,846	50.8	
Ministerialist	Henry Daglish	1,786	49.2	
Total formal votes		3,632	92.0	
Informal votes		314	8.0	
Turnout		3,946	78.4	
Labor gain from Ministerialist		Swing		

=== Sussex ===
1911 Western Australian state election: Sussex
Party	Candidate	Votes	%	±%
Ministerialist	Frank Wilson	943	59.6	
Labor	John Parke	638	40.4	
Total formal votes		1,581	99.5	
Informal votes		8	0.5	
Turnout		1,589	70.4	
Ministerialist hold		Swing		

=== Swan ===
1911 Western Australian state election: Swan
Party	Candidate	Votes	%	±%
Labor	Philip Turvey	1,012	51.2	
Ministerialist	Mathieson Jacoby	963	48.8	
Total formal votes		1,975	99.6	
Informal votes		7	0.4	
Turnout		1,982	77.8	
Labor gain from Ministerialist		Swing		

=== Toodyay ===
1911 Western Australian state election: Toodyay
Party	Candidate	Votes	%	±%
Ministerialist	Timothy Quinlan	790	36.1	
Ministerialist	Alfred Piesse	727	33.3	
Labor	Ernest Mitchell	669	30.6	
Total formal votes		2,186	99.0	
Informal votes		22	1.0	
Turnout		2,208	63.2	
Two-candidate-preferred result
Ministerialist	Alfred Piesse	1,171	53.6	
Ministerialist	Timothy Quinlan	1,015	46.4	
Ministerialist hold		Swing		

=== Wagin ===
1911 Western Australian state election: Wagin
Party	Candidate	Votes	%	±%
Ministerialist	Sydney Stubbs	1,042	68.7	
Labor	Julius Nenke	474	31.3	
Total formal votes		1,516	98.4	
Informal votes		25	1.6	
Turnout		1,541	73.3	
Ministerialist hold		Swing		

=== West Perth ===
1911 Western Australian state election: West Perth
Party	Candidate	Votes	%	±%
Labor	Walter Simpson	1,608	44.0	
Ministerialist	Eben Allen	1,219	33.4	
Ministerialist	Richard Vincent	825	22.6	
Total formal votes		3,652	98.6	
Informal votes		52	1.4	
Turnout		3,704	82.2	
Two-party-preferred result
Ministerialist	Eben Allen	1,991	54.5	
Labor	Walter Simpson	1,661	45.5	
Ministerialist hold		Swing		

=== Williams-Narrogin ===
1911 Western Australian state election: Williams-Narrogin
Party	Candidate	Votes	%	±%
Labor	Edward Johnston	1,229	54.2	
Ministerialist	Frank Cowcher	1,018	44.9	
Independent	James Sale	20	0.9	
Total formal votes		2,267	98.5	
Informal votes		34	1.5	
Turnout		2,301	77.8	
Labor gain from Ministerialist		Swing		

- Preferences were not distributed.

=== Yilgarn ===
1911 Western Australian state election: Yilgarn
Party	Candidate	Votes	%	±%
Labor	Charles Hudson	1,058	62.6	
Independent	Austin Horan	633	37.4	
Total formal votes		1,691	99.8	
Informal votes		3	0.2	
Turnout		1,694	67.0	
Labor hold		Swing		

=== York ===
1911 Western Australian state election: York
Party	Candidate	Votes	%	±%
Ministerialist	Frederick Monger	763	46.5	
Labor	Henry Dhu	395	24.1	
Ministerialist	Charles Baxter	341	20.8	
Ministerialist	Edward Neville	141	8.6	
Total formal votes		1,640	98.2	
Informal votes		30	1.8	
Turnout		1,670	64.5	
Two-party-preferred result
Ministerialist	Frederick Monger	1,104	67.3	
Labor	Henry Dhu	536	32.7	
Ministerialist hold		Swing		

== See also ==
- 1911 Western Australian state election
- Members of the Western Australian Legislative Assembly, 1911–1914
