= Electoral results for the district of Leederville =

Electoral results for Leederville district in Western Australian state elections

This is a list of electoral results for the Electoral district of Leederville in Western Australian state elections.

== Members for Leederville ==
Member	Party	Term
Frederick Gill	Labor	1911–1914
John Veryard	Liberal	1914–1917
John Veryard	Nationalist	1917–1921
Lionel Carter	Nationalist	1921–1924
Harry Millington	Labor	1924–1930
Alexander Panton	Labor	1930–1951
Ted Johnson	Labor	1952–1959
Guy Henn	LCL	1959–1962

== Election results ==
=== Elections in the 1950s ===
1959 Western Australian state election: Leederville
Party	Candidate	Votes	%	±%
Liberal and Country	Guy Henn	3,991	46.5	−2.7
Labor	Ted Johnson	3,497	40.8	−10.0
Democratic Labor	John Antill	1,089	12.7	+12.7
Total formal votes		8,577	98.2	−0.1
Informal votes		158	1.8	+0.1
Turnout		8,735	94.3	+0.5
Two-party-preferred result
Liberal and Country	Guy Henn	4,951	57.7	+8.5
Labor	Ted Johnson	3,626	42.3	−8.5
Liberal and Country gain from Labor		Swing	+8.5	

1956 Western Australian state election: Leederville
Party	Candidate	Votes	%	±%
Labor	Ted Johnson	4,353	50.8	
Liberal and Country	Les Nimmo	4,217	49.2	
Total formal votes		8,570	98.3	
Informal votes		144	1.7	
Turnout		8,714	93.8	
Labor hold		Swing		

1953 Western Australian state election: Leederville
Party	Candidate	Votes	%	±%
Labor	Ted Johnson	4,067	56.0	+3.9
Liberal and Country	Jessie Robertson	3,193	44.0	−3.9
Total formal votes		7,260	98.2	+0.1
Informal votes		130	1.8	−0.1
Turnout		7,390	94.8	+3.4
Labor hold		Swing	+3.9	

1952 Leederville state by-election
Party	Candidate	Votes	%	±%
Labor	Ted Johnson	3,902	54.6	+2.5
Liberal and Country	George Melville	3,247	45.4	−2.5
Total formal votes		7,149	98.7	+0.6
Informal votes		91	1.3	−0.6
Turnout		7,240	88.1	−3.3
Labor hold		Swing	+2.5	

1950 Western Australian state election: Leederville
Party	Candidate	Votes	%	±%
Labor	Alexander Panton	3,997	52.1	
Liberal and Country	George Melville	3,675	47.9	
Total formal votes		7,672	98.1	
Informal votes		147	1.9	
Turnout		7,819	91.4	
Labor hold		Swing		

=== Elections in the 1940s ===
1947 Western Australian state election: Leederville
Party	Candidate	Votes	%	±%
Labor	Alexander Panton	unopposed		
Labor hold		Swing		

1943 Western Australian state election: Leederville
Party	Candidate	Votes	%	±%
Labor	Alexander Panton	5,349	63.9	+12.0
Nationalist	Charles Hammond	3,024	36.1	−1.1
Total formal votes		8,373	97.4	−0.9
Informal votes		222	2.6	+0.9
Turnout		8,595	86.7	−8.9
Labor hold		Swing	N/A	

=== Elections in the 1930s ===
1939 Western Australian state election: Leederville
Party	Candidate	Votes	%	±%
Labor	Alexander Panton	4,694	51.9	−16.1
Nationalist	Walter Goodlet	3,362	37.2	+37.2
Independent	James Kelly	991	10.9	+10.9
Total formal votes		9,047	98.3	+0.1
Informal votes		153	1.7	−0.1
Turnout		9,200	95.6	+13.6
Labor hold		Swing	N/A	

1936 Western Australian state election: Leederville
Party	Candidate	Votes	%	±%
Labor	Alexander Panton	3,688	58.3	−0.1
Nationalist	Charles Veryard	2,638	41.7	+20.1
Total formal votes		6,326	98.9	+1.2
Informal votes		67	1.1	−1.2
Turnout		6,393	69.4	−24.3
Labor hold		Swing	N/A	

1933 Western Australian state election: Leederville
Party	Candidate	Votes	%	±%
Labor	Alexander Panton	4,846	58.4	+10.0
Nationalist	Henry Simper	1,791	21.6	+5.8
Nationalist	Ernest Caddy	1,660	20.0	+20.0
Total formal votes		8,297	97.7	−1.0
Informal votes		196	2.3	+1.0
Turnout		8,493	93.7	+21.9
Labor hold		Swing	N/A	

- Preferences were not distributed.

1930 Western Australian state election: Leederville
Party	Candidate	Votes	%	±%
Labor	Alexander Panton	3,242	48.4	
Nationalist	George Taylor	1,734	25.9	
Nationalist	Henry Simper	1,056	15.8	
Nationalist	Charles Hammond	665	9.9	
Total formal votes		6,697	98.7	
Informal votes		86	1.3	
Turnout		6,783	71.8	
After distribution of preferences
Labor	Alexander Panton	3,379	50.4	
Nationalist	George Taylor	2,015	30.1	
Nationalist	Henry Simper	1,304	19.5	
Labor hold		Swing		

=== Elections in the 1920s ===
1927 Western Australian state election: Leederville
Party	Candidate	Votes	%	±%
Labor	Harry Millington	5,000	55.4	+2.2
Nationalist	John Scaddan	3,320	36.8	−10.0
Ind. Nationalist	Christina Blake	711	7.9	+7.9
Total formal votes		9,031	97.4	−1.9
Informal votes		243	2.6	+1.9
Turnout		9,274	77.9	+20.2
Labor hold		Swing	N/A	

- Preferences were not distributed.

1924 Western Australian state election: Leederville
Party	Candidate	Votes	%	±%
Labor	Harry Millington	3,177	53.2	+16.5
Nationalist	Lionel Carter	2,793	46.8	+20.8
Total formal votes		5,970	99.3	+2.1
Informal votes		42	0.7	−2.1
Turnout		6,012	57.7	−4.6
Labor gain from Nationalist		Swing	+10.1	

1921 Western Australian state election: Leederville
Party	Candidate	Votes	%	±%
Labor	Harry Millington	1,995	36.7	+36.7
Nationalist	Lionel Carter	1,415	26.0	−29.2
Nationalist	Fred Gulley	1,165	21.4	+21.4
Nationalist	John Selby	470	8.6	+8.6
National Labor	John Slocombe	198	3.6	+3.6
Independent Labor	Herman Lehmann	193	3.6	+3.6
Total formal votes		5,436	97.2	−1.9
Informal votes		156	2.8	+1.9
Turnout		5,592	62.3	+12.4
Two-party-preferred result
Nationalist	Lionel Carter	3,092	56.9	+1.7
Labor	Harry Millington	2,344	43.1	+43.1
Nationalist hold		Swing	N/A	

=== Elections in the 1910s ===
1917 Western Australian state election: Leederville
Party	Candidate	Votes	%	±%
National Liberal	John Veryard	2,129	55.2	+55.2
Nationalist	Sidney Gibson	1,726	44.8	+44.8
Total formal votes		3,855	99.1	+0.8
Informal votes		33	0.9	–0.8
Turnout		3,888	49.9	–7.1
National Liberal hold		Swing	N/A	

- Veryard's designation at the 1914 election was simply "Liberal", rather than "National Liberal".

1914 Western Australian state election: Leederville
Party	Candidate	Votes	%	±%
Labor	Frederick Gill	2,326	46.9	−11.0
Liberal	John Veryard	1,480	29.8	+2.9
Liberal	Osmond Fry	1,153	23.2	+23.2
Total formal votes		4,959	98.3	+1.4
Informal votes		86	1.7	−1.4
Turnout		5,045	57.0	−24.7
Two-party-preferred result
Liberal	John Veryard	2,520	50.8	
Labor	Frederick Gill	2,439	49.2	
Liberal gain from Labor		Swing	N/A	

1911 Western Australian state election: Leederville
Party	Candidate	Votes	%	±%
Labor	Frederick Gill	2,192	57.9	
Ministerialist	John Veryard	1,019	26.9	
Ministerialist	William Mitchell	531	14.0	
Ministerialist	Joseph Elliott	43	1.1	
Total formal votes		3,785	96.9	
Informal votes		119	3.1	
Turnout		3,904	81.7	
Labor hold		Swing		

- Preferences were not distributed.
