= Members of the Western Australian Legislative Assembly, 1914–1917 =

This is a list of members of the Western Australian Legislative Assembly between the 1914 election and the 1917 election, together known as the Ninth Parliament. The re-election of Premier John Scaddan's Labor Government with a 26-24 majority in 1914 was tempered when, a year later, Labor member Joseph Gardiner's seat was declared vacant on account of his non-attendance and a Liberal was elected in his stead, and Labor became a minority government when on 18 December 1915, Edward Johnston resigned from the Labor Party and became an independent. On 27 July 1916, the Scaddan Ministry was defeated and the Liberals' Frank Wilson became the new premier.

In March 1917, the Labor Party split ahead of the 1917 federal election. The federal party had split a year earlier over military conscription, and in Western Australia, where conscription was widely supported, all of the Labor Senators up for election had joined Billy Hughes's Nationalist Party. A number of state Labor members, including former Premier John Scaddan, either resigned from the Party or were expelled for supporting them. By May 1917, they had formed a new National Labor Party with a base in the Goldfields region, historically the heart of the Labor vote in Western Australia. In June 1917, they formed a coalition with the new Nationalist Party (which replaced the former Liberal Party) and the Country Party to form a governing coalition. With these arrangements, another Ministry was formed under new Premier Henry Lefroy.

Name	Party	District	Years in office
Eben Allen	Liberal	West Perth	1911–1917
William Angwin^{[1]}	Labor	North-East Fremantle	1904–1905; 1906–1927
Harry Bolton	Labor/Nat. Lab.	South Fremantle	1904–1917
William Butcher^{[2]}	Liberal	Roebourne	1901–1911; 1915–1917
William Carpenter	Labor/Nat. Lab.	Fremantle	1911–1917
Thomas Chesson	Labor	Cue	1913–1930
Philip Collier	Labor	Boulder	1905–1948
Sir James Connolly^{[9]}	Liberal	Perth	1914–1917
John Cunningham	Country	Greenough	1914–1917
Samuel Elliott^{[7]}	Liberal	Geraldton	1913–1914; 1917
George Foley	Labor/Nat. Lab.	Mount Leonora	1911–1920
James Gardiner^{[8]}	Country	Irwin	1901–1904; 1914–1921
Joseph Gardiner^{[2]}	Labor	Roebourne	1911–1915
William James George^{[4]}	Liberal	Murray-Wellington	1895–1902; 1909–1930
Archibald Gilchrist	Liberal	Gascoyne	1914–1917
Albert Green	Labor	Kalgoorlie	1911–1913; 1914–1921
Harry Griffiths	Country	York	1914–1921; 1924–1935
John Hardwick	Liberal	East Perth	1904–1911; 1914–1921
Tom Harrison	Country	Avon	1914–1924
Edward Heitmann^{[7]}	Labor/Nat. Lab.	Geraldton	1904–1913; 1914–1917
Henry Hickmott	Country	Pingelly	1914–1924
John Holman	Labor	Murchison	1901–1921; 1923–1925
Charles Hudson^{[10]}	Labor/Nat. Lab.	Yilgarn	1905–1921
William Johnson	Labor	Guildford	1901–1905; 1906–1917; 1924–1948
Edward Johnston^{[3]}	Labor/Independent/ Country	Williams-Narrogin	1911–1928
George Lambert^{[6]}	Labor	Coolgardie	1916–1930; 1933–1941
Hon Sir Henry Lefroy^{[4]}	Liberal	Moore	1892–1901; 1911–1921
John Lutey^{[5]}^{[8]}	Labor	Brownhill-Ivanhoe	1916; 1917–1932
Arthur Male	Liberal	Kimberley	1905–1917
Charles McDowall^{[6]}	Labor	Coolgardie	1908–1916
James Mitchell^{[4]}	Liberal	Northam	1905–1933
John Mullany	Labor/Nat. Lib.	Menzies	1911–1924
Selby Munsie	Labor	Hannans	1911–1938
William Ralph Nairn	Liberal	Swan	1914–1921
Peter O'Loghlen	Labor	Forrest	1908–1923
Alfred Piesse	Country	Toodyay	1911–1924
Robert Pilkington^{[9]}	Nat. Lib.	Perth	1917–1921
William Price	Labor/Nat. Lab.	Albany	1909–1917
Robert Robinson^{[4]}	Liberal	Canning	1914–1921
John Scaddan^{[5]}^{[8]}	Labor/Nat. Lab.	Brownhill-Ivanhoe	1904–1917; 1919–1924; 1930–1933
James MacCallum Smith	Liberal	North Perth	1914–1939
Bartholomew James Stubbs	Labor	Subiaco	1911–1917
Sydney Stubbs	Liberal/Country	Wagin	1911–1947
George Taylor	Labor/Nat. Lab.	Mount Margaret	1901–1930
William Lemen Thomas	Labor/Nat. Lab.	Bunbury	1911–1917
Alec Thomson	Liberal/Country	Katanning	1914–1930
Michael Troy	Labor	Mount Magnet	1904–1939
Henry Underwood	Labor/Nat. Lib.	Pilbara	1906–1924
John Veryard	Liberal	Leederville	1905–1908; 1914–1921
Thomas Walker	Labor	Kanowna	1905–1932
Charles Wansbrough	Country	Beverley	1914–1917; 1924–1930
Francis Willmott	Country	Nelson	1914–1921
Arthur Wilson	Labor	Collie	1908–1947
Frank Wilson^{[4]}	Liberal	Sussex	1897–1901; 1904–1917
Evan Wisdom	Liberal	Claremont	1911–1917

== Notes ==
^{1} William Angwin, member for North-East Fremantle, was appointed to the Scaddan Ministry as Minister for Works on 23 November 1914. Angwin was therefore required to resign and contest a ministerial by-election on 2 December 1914, at which he was returned unopposed.
^{2} On 30 September 1915, the seat of Roebourne was declared vacant due to Labor member Joseph Gardiner's extended absence from Parliament without explanation or leave. A by-election was held on 17 November 1915, and the Liberal candidate William Butcher, who had held the seat of Gascoyne in the previous Parliament, was elected. As a result, the Labor party lost its two-seat majority.
^{3} On 18 December 1915, the Labor member for Williams-Narrogin, Edward Johnston, resigned from the Labor Party and from Parliament. He was returned unopposed as an Independent at the close of nominations for the resulting by-election on 9 January 1916. In mid-1917, he joined the Country Party.
^{4} The Scaddan Ministry, following a successful want of confidence motion, was defeated and replaced on 27 July 1916 by a new six-member Ministry comprising Liberal and Country Party members led by Frank Wilson. These members were therefore required to resign and contest ministerial by-elections. Henry Lefroy (Moore), William James George (Murray-Wellington) and Frank Wilson (Sussex) were returned unopposed on 10 August 1916, while James Mitchell (Northam) and Robert Robinson (Canning) were elected on 19 August 1916, the latter being opposed unsuccessfully by the previous Labor premier John Scaddan.
^{5} The Labor member for Brownhill-Ivanhoe and former premier, John Scaddan, resigned from his seat on 8 August 1916 in order to contest the Canning ministerial by-election. On 19 August 1916, Labor candidate John Lutey was elected unopposed to fill the vacancy. However, upon Scaddan's narrow loss in Canning, Lutey resigned from the seat on 15 September 1916 before being sworn in to allow Scaddan to regain his seat, which he did at the resulting by-election on 7 October 1916 against two minor-party candidates.
^{6} The Labor member for Coolgardie, Charles McDowall, died on 13 July 1916. The Labor candidate, George Lambert, was elected to fill the vacancy at the resulting by-election held on 15 August 1916.
^{7} The National Labor (formerly Labor) member for Geraldton, Edward Heitmann, resigned his seat on 20 March 1917 in order to stand at the upcoming federal election on 5 May for the seat of Kalgoorlie. The Liberal candidate, Samuel Elliott, was elected on 14 April 1917 at the by-election to fill the vacancy.
^{8} On 28 June 1917, a new Ministry led by Nationalist Premier Sir Henry Lefroy was appointed. James Gardiner (Irwin), appointed Colonial Treasurer, and John Scaddan (Brownhill-Ivanhoe), appointed Minister for Railways, were required to resign and contest ministerial by-elections. While Gardiner was returned unopposed on 11 July 1917, Scaddan lost the by-election held on 21 July 1917 to Labour candidate John Lutey, who had held the seat for 27 days in 1916. This was only the second occasion in Western Australia's parliamentary history—the first having been the defeat of half of the Morgans Ministry in December 1901—that a Minister had failed to retain his seat at a ministerial by-election resulting from his appointment.
^{9} The Liberal member for Perth, Sir James Connolly, resigned in June 1917. The Nationalist (Liberal) candidate, Robert Pilkington, won the seat at the resulting by-election on 21 July 1917.
^{10} National Labor (formerly Labor) member Charles Hudson was appointed in Scaddan's stead as Minister for Railways on 27 July 1917, and resigned his seat in preparation for a ministerial by-election, but due to the state election being held two months later, one was never held and he retained the seat at the general election.

== Sources ==
- Black, David; Prescott, Valerie (1997). Election statistics, Legislative Assembly of Western Australia, 1890-1996. Perth: Parliamentary History Project. ISBN 0-7309-8409-5.
- Hughes, Colin A.; Graham, B. D. (1976). Voting for the South Australian, Western Australian and Tasmanian Lower Houses, 1890-1964. Canberra: Australian National University. ISBN 0-7081-1334-6.
