= Members of the Western Australian Legislative Assembly, 1911–1914 =

This is a list of members of the Western Australian Legislative Assembly between the 1911 election and the 1914 election, together known as the Eighth Parliament. All members who sat as Liberals, apart from those returned at by-elections, were elected under the "Ministerial" designation at the 1911 election.

Name	Party	District	Years in office
Eben Allen	Liberal	West Perth	1911–1917
William Angwin	Labor	North-East Fremantle	1904–1905; 1906–1927
Thomas Bath^{[1]}	Labor	Avon	1902–1914
Harry Bolton	Labor	South Fremantle	1904–1917
Frank Broun	Liberal	Beverley	1911–1914; 1917–1924
William Carpenter	Labor	Fremantle	1911–1917
Thomas Chesson^{[3]}	Labor	Cue	1913–1930
Philip Collier^{[1]}	Labor	Boulder	1905–1948
Bronte Dooley^{[4]}	Labor	Geraldton	1911–1913
Walter Dwyer	Labor	Perth	1911–1914
Samuel Elliott^{[4]}	Liberal	Geraldton	1913–1914; 1917
George Foley	Labor	Mount Leonora	1911–1920
Joseph Gardiner	Labor	Roebourne	1911–1915
William James George	Liberal	Murray-Wellington	1895–1902; 1909–1930
Frederick Gill	Labor	Leederville	1904–1905; 1908–1914
William Gordon	Liberal	Canning	1901–1911
Albert Green^{[5]}	Labor	Kalgoorlie	1911–1913; 1914–1921
Nat Harper	Liberal	Pingelly	1910–1914
Edward Heitmann^{[3]}^{[4]}	Labor	Cue	1904–1913; 1914–1917
John Holman	Labor	Murchison	1901–1921; 1923–1925
Charles Hudson	Labor	Yilgarn	1905–1921
William Johnson^{[1]}	Labor	Guildford	1901–1905; 1906–1917; 1924–1948
Edward Johnston	Labor	Williams-Narrogin	1911–1928
Titus Lander	Labor	East Perth	1911–1914
Charles Layman	Liberal^{[6]}	Nelson	1904–1914
Henry Lefroy	Liberal	Moore	1892–1901; 1911–1921
Charles Lewis	Labor	Canning	1911–1914
Arthur Male	Liberal	Kimberley	1905–1917
John James McDonald	Labor	Gascoyne	1911–1914
Charles McDowall	Labor	Coolgardie	1908–1916
George McLeod^{[5]}	Labor	Kalgoorlie	1914
James Mitchell	Liberal	Northam	1905–1933
Frederick Monger	Liberal	York	1892–1903; 1905–1914
Samuel Moore	Liberal	Irwin	1904–1914
Thomas Moore^{[2]}	Labor	Forrest	1913
John Mullany	Labor	Menzies	1911–1924
Selby Munsie	Labor	Hannans	1911–1938
John Nanson	Liberal	Greenough	1901–1905; 1908–1914
Peter O'Loghlen^{[2]}	Labor	Forrest	1908–1923
Alfred Piesse	Liberal^{[6]}	Toodyay	1911–1924
Arnold Piesse	Liberal	Katanning	1909–1914; 1930–1935
William Price	Labor	Albany	1909–1917
John Scaddan^{[1]}	Labor	Brownhill-Ivanhoe	1904–1917; 1919–1924; 1930–1933
Bartholomew James Stubbs	Labor	Subiaco	1911–1917
Sydney Stubbs	Liberal	Wagin	1911–1947
Herbert Swan	Labor	North Perth	1908–1914
George Taylor	Labor	Mount Margaret	1901–1930
William Lemen Thomas^{[2]}	Labor	Bunbury	1911–1917
Michael Troy	Labor	Mount Magnet	1904–1939
Philip Turvey	Labor	Swan	1911–1914
Henry Underwood	Labor	Pilbara	1906–1924
Thomas Walker^{[1]}	Labor	Kanowna	1905–1932
Arthur Wilson	Labor	Collie	1908–1947
Frank Wilson	Liberal	Sussex	1897–1901; 1904–1917
Evan Wisdom	Liberal	Claremont	1911–1917

== Notes ==
^{1} Following the 1911 state election a new Ministry consisting of six members, including one Member of the Legislative Council, was appointed. These members were therefore required to resign and contest ministerial by-elections on 17 October 1911, at which all were returned unopposed.
^{2} Peter O'Loghlen, the Labor member for Forrest, resigned his seat on 17 April 1913 to contest the seat of Swan at the 1913 federal election on 31 May. Thomas Moore, the Labor candidate, was elected unopposed on 6 May 1913, but resigned on 17 June before being sworn in. O'Loghlen contested a second by-election for Forrest on 3 July 1913, at which he was successful.
^{3} Edward Heitmann, the Labor member for Cue, resigned on 4 November 1913 in order to contest the Geraldton by-election. Thomas Chesson, the Labor candidate, was elected unopposed on 12 November 1913 to fill the vacancy.
^{4} Bronte Dooley, the Labor member for Geraldton, died on 19 October 1913. A by-election was called for 15 November 1913 in the seat, at which Edward Heitmann, who had resigned his seat of Cue to contest the by-election, was defeated on a 12-vote margin by Samuel Elliott of the Liberal Party.
^{5} Albert Green, the Labor member for Kalgoorlie, resigned on 8 December 1913. The Labor candidate, George McLeod, won the by-election held to fill the vacancy on 4 February 1914. McLeod retired at the general election held on 21 October 1914 to enable Green to regain the seat.
^{6} With the formation of the Country Party in August 1913, two Members of the Legislative Assembly, Charles Layman (Nelson) and Alfred Piesse (Toodyay), switched their allegiance from the Liberals to the new party prior to the 1914 election, at which they retained their seats as Country Party members.

== Sources ==
- Black, David; Prescott, Valerie (1997). Election statistics, Legislative Assembly of Western Australia, 1890-1996. Perth: Parliamentary History Project. ISBN 0-7309-8409-5.
- Hughes, Colin A.; Graham, B. D. (1976). Voting for the South Australian, Western Australian and Tasmanian Lower Houses, 1890-1964. Canberra: Australian National University. ISBN 0-7081-1334-6.
- Parliament of Western Australia (1914). Western Australian Parliamentary Debates (Eighth Parliament—Third Session). Vol. 58. Frederick William Simpson. pp. v–vi.
- Western Australian Government Gazettes for 1911–1914; Indexed under "Electoral". Note esp. "Extraordinary Government Gazette". Western Australia Government Gazette. 9 October 1911. p. 1911:3861.
