= Electoral results for the district of Mount Magnet =

Western Australian district election results

This is a list of electoral results for the Electoral district of Mount Magnet in Western Australian state elections.

== Members for Mount Magnet ==
| Members | Party | Term |
|---|---|---|
| Frank Wallace | Opposition | 1901–1904 |
| Frank Troy | Labor | 1904–1939 |
| Lucien Triat | Labor | 1939–1950 |

== Election results ==
=== Elections in the 1940s ===
1947 Western Australian state election: Mount Magnet
| Party | Candidate | Votes | % | ±% |
|---|---|---|---|---|
| Labor | Lucien Triat | unopposed | | |
| Labor hold | | Swing | | |

1943 Western Australian state election: Mount Magnet
| Party | Candidate | Votes | % | ±% |
|---|---|---|---|---|
| Labor | Lucien Triat | 1,075 | 68.7 | +13.7 |
| Independent Labor | Arthur Cooper | 489 | 31.3 | +31.3 |
| Total formal votes | | 1,564 | 97.4 | +0.1 |
| Informal votes | | 41 | 2.6 | −0.1 |
| Turnout | | 1,605 | 72.1 | −9.6 |
| Labor hold | | Swing | N/A | |

=== Elections in the 1930s ===
1939 Western Australian state election: Mount Magnet
| Party | Candidate | Votes | % | ±% |
|---|---|---|---|---|
| Labor | Lucien Triat | 1,548 | 55.0 | −45.0 |
| Country | Peter Cassey | 839 | 29.8 | +29.8 |
| Independent | Arthur Cooper | 429 | 15.2 | +15.2 |
| Total formal votes | | 2,816 | 97.3 | |
| Informal votes | | 79 | 2.7 | |
| Turnout | | 2,895 | 81.7 | |
| Labor hold | | Swing | N/A | |

1936 Western Australian state election: Mount Magnet
| Party | Candidate | Votes | % | ±% |
|---|---|---|---|---|
| Labor | Michael Troy | unopposed | | |
| Labor hold | | Swing | | |

1933 Western Australian state election: Mount Magnet
| Party | Candidate | Votes | % | ±% |
|---|---|---|---|---|
| Labor | Michael Troy | unopposed | | |
| Labor hold | | Swing | | |

1930 Western Australian state election: Mount Magnet
| Party | Candidate | Votes | % | ±% |
|---|---|---|---|---|
| Labor | Michael Troy | 929 | 58.9 | |
| Labor | Peter Cowan | 648 | 41.1 | |
| Total formal votes | | 1,577 | 99.2 | |
| Informal votes | | 12 | 0.8 | |
| Turnout | | 1,589 | 79.1 | |
| Labor hold | | Swing | | |

=== Elections in the 1920s ===
1927 Western Australian state election: Mount Magnet
| Party | Candidate | Votes | % | ±% |
|---|---|---|---|---|
| Labor | Michael Troy | unopposed | | |
| Labor hold | | Swing | | |

1924 Western Australian state election: Mount Magnet
| Party | Candidate | Votes | % | ±% |
|---|---|---|---|---|
| Labor | Michael Troy | unopposed | | |
| Labor hold | | Swing | | |

1921 Western Australian state election: Mount Magnet
| Party | Candidate | Votes | % | ±% |
|---|---|---|---|---|
| Labor | Michael Troy | 710 | 80.1 | −19.9 |
| Nationalist | William Woodgate | 114 | 12.8 | +12.8 |
| Country | Louis Dewar | 63 | 7.1 | +7.1 |
| Total formal votes | | 887 | 98.7 | |
| Informal votes | | 12 | 1.3 | |
| Turnout | | 899 | 72.4 | |
| Labor hold | | Swing | N/A | |

- Preferences were not distributed.

=== Elections in the 1910s ===
1917 Western Australian state election: Mount Magnet
| Party | Candidate | Votes | % | ±% |
|---|---|---|---|---|
| Labor | Frank Troy | unopposed | | |
| Labor hold | | Swing | | |

1914 Western Australian state election: Mount Magnet
| Party | Candidate | Votes | % | ±% |
|---|---|---|---|---|
| Labor | Michael Troy | unopposed | | |
| Labor hold | | Swing | | |

1911 Western Australian state election: Mount Magnet
| Party | Candidate | Votes | % | ±% |
|---|---|---|---|---|
| Labor | Michael Troy | unopposed | | |
| Labor hold | | Swing | | |

=== Elections in the 1900s ===
1908 Western Australian state election: Mount Magnet
| Party | Candidate | Votes | % | ±% |
|---|---|---|---|---|
| Labour | Michael Troy | unopposed | | |
| Labour hold | | Swing | | |

1905 Western Australian state election: Mount Magnet
| Party | Candidate | Votes | % | ±% |
|---|---|---|---|---|
| Labour | Frank Troy | 557 | 66.2 | +4.9 |
| Ministerialist | George Baxter | 285 | 33.8 | –4.9 |
| Total formal votes | | 842 | 98.6 | –2.8 |
| Informal votes | | 12 | 1.4 | +2.8 |
| Turnout | | 854 | 45.4 | –3.2 |
| Labour hold | | Swing | +4.9 | |

1904 Western Australian state election: Mount Magnet
| Party | Candidate | Votes | % | ±% |
|---|---|---|---|---|
| Labour | Frank Troy | 721 | 61.3 | +28.5 |
| Ministerialist | Joseph Bryant | 456 | 38.7 | +38.7 |
| Total formal votes | | 1,177 | 95.8 | –3.9 |
| Informal votes | | 52 | 4.2 | +3.9 |
| Turnout | | 1,227 | 48.6 | +0.4 |
| Labour gain from Opposition | | Swing | +28.5 | |

1901 Western Australian state election: Mount Magnet
| Party | Candidate | Votes | % | ±% |
|---|---|---|---|---|
| Opposition | Frank Wallace | 265 | 41.1 | +41.1 |
| Labour | John Holman | 211 | 32.8 | +32.8 |
| Ministerialist | Alec Clydesdale | 168 | 26.1 | +26.1 |
| Total formal votes | | 644 | 99.7 | n/a |
| Informal votes | | 2 | 0.3 | n/a |
| Turnout | | 646 | 48.2 | n/a |
| Opposition win | | (new seat) | | |
