= Electoral results for the district of East Kimberley =

Western Australian district election results

This is a list of electoral results for the Electoral district of East Kimberley in Western Australian state elections.

== Members for East Kimberley ==
Member	Party	Term
William Leonard Baker		1890–1893
Francis Connor	Independent	1893–1904

== Election results ==
=== Elections in the 1900s ===
1901 Western Australian state election: East Kimberley
Party	Candidate	Votes	%	±%
Ministerialist	Francis Connor	33	50.8	–49.2
Opposition	William Stretch	32	49.2	+49.2
Total formal votes		65	98.5	n/a
Informal votes		1	1.5	n/a
Turnout		66	61.1	n/a
Ministerialist hold		Swing	–49.2	

- Connor had held the seat unopposed in 1897.

=== Elections in the 1890s ===
1897 Western Australian colonial election: East Kimberley
Party	Candidate	Votes	%	±%
Ministerialist	Francis Connor	unopposed		
Ministerialist hold		Swing		

1894 Western Australian colonial election: East Kimberley
Party	Candidate	Votes	%	±%
None	Francis Connor	unopposed		

1893 East Kimberley colonial by-election
Party	Candidate	Votes	%	±%
None	Francis Connor	unopposed		

1890 Western Australian colonial election: East Kimberley
Party	Candidate	Votes	%	±%
None	William Baker	unopposed		
