= Electoral results for the district of Yalgoo =

Western Australian district election results

This is a list of electoral results for the Electoral district of Yalgoo in Western Australian state elections.

== Members for Yalgoo ==
Member	Party	Term
Frank Wallace	Independent	1897–1901

== Election results ==
=== Elections in the 1890s ===
1897 Western Australian colonial election: Yalgoo
Party	Candidate	Votes	%	±%
Independent	Frank Wallace	39	50.7	
Opposition	Henry Mills	35	45.4	
Independent	Solomon Lowns	3	3.9	
Total formal votes		77	100.0	
Informal votes		0	0.0	
Turnout		77	56.6	
Independent hold		Swing		
