= Yalgoo =

Yalgoo may refer to:

- Yalgoo, Western Australia, a locality in Western Australia
- Yalgoo bioregion, an ecological region of Western Australia
- Shire of Yalgoo, a local government area
- Electoral district of Yalgoo, a former electorate of the Western Australian Legislative Assembly
- Acacia longiphyllodinea, a wattle native to Western Australia
