= Frank Cross =

Frank Cross may refer to:

- Frank Moore Cross (1921–2012), professor of Hebrew at Harvard University
- Frank Cross (baseball) (1873–1932), American Major League baseball player
- Frank Cross (businessman), (1910–2011), Western Australian businessman
- F. L. Cross (Frank Leslie Cross, 1900–1968), professor of divinity at the University of Oxford
