= Frank Cross (businessman) =

Businessman from Western Australia

Frank Cross (13 November 1910 – September 2011) was a Western Australian businessman who united business groups in 1975 into the Confederation of WA Industry, a predecessor to the Chamber of Commerce and Industry of Western Australia.

Cross's career began when he was 15 years old, as a cadet industrial officer at the Western Australian Employers' Federation. He became skilled in negotiations, while also learning economics, industrial relations, accountancy, and law. Cross spent more than twenty years assisting employers negotiating agreements with trade unions, including as a court advocate in both state and federal arbitration courts, and became a senior industrial advocate figure and mentor.

Cross worked with the Western Australian government in the 1950s and 1960s to attract international investment to and development of the state's resources industry, including securing BP opening the Kwinana Oil Refinery in Perth's southern suburbs rather than in Brisbane, Queensland.

Cross died at age 100. He had three children, nine grandchildren and 13 great-grandchildren. Cross was recognised as one of the most influential Western Australian businesspeople in The West Australian's 2013 list of the 100 most influential.
