= Alexander Panton =

Australian politician

11th Speaker of the Western Australian Legislative Assembly
- In office 18 July 1933 – 24 March 1938
- Preceded by: Sydney Stubbs
- Succeeded by: William Johnson

Member of the Western Australian Legislative Assembly for Leederville
- In office 13 April 1930 – 25 December 1951
- Preceded by: Harry Millington
- Succeeded by: Ted Johnson

Member of the Western Australian Legislative Assembly for Menzies
- In office 22 March 1924 – 12 April 1930
- Preceded by: John Mullany
- Succeeded by: Constituency abolished

Member of the Western Australian Legislative Council for West Province
- In office 5 July 1919 – 21 May 1922
- Preceded by: Sir Henry Briggs
- Succeeded by: George Potter

Personal details
- Born: 20 March 1877 Alma, Victoria
- Died: 25 December 1951 (aged 74) North Perth, Western Australia
- Resting place: Karrakatta Cemetery
- Party: Labor
- Spouse: Married
- Children: 3

Military service
- Allegiance: Australia
- Battles/wars: Second Boer War; First World War

Alexander Hugh Panton (20 March 1877 – 25 December 1951) was an Australian politician. He was a Labor member of the Western Australian Legislative Council from 1919 to 1922, before entering the Western Australian Legislative Assembly in 1924, representing Menzies. He transferred to Leederville in 1930 and served until 1951. From 1933 to 1938 he was Speaker of the Assembly. He served as minister for Health, and later Mines under the Willcock ministry.

Western Australian Legislative Assembly
| Preceded by Sydney Stubbs | Speaker of the Legislative Assembly; 1933 – 1938 | Succeeded by William Johnson |
| Preceded by Harry Millington | Member for Leederville; 1930 – 1951 | Succeeded by Ted Johnson |
| Preceded by John Mullany | Member for Menzies; 1924 – 1930 | Succeeded by Constituency abolished |
Western Australian Legislative Council
| Preceded by Henry Briggs | Member for West Province; 1919-1922 | Succeeded by George Potter |
