= George Potter (politician) =

Australian politician

The Honourable George Potter

Member of the Legislative Council of Western Australia
- In office 22 May 1922 – 21 May 1928
- Preceded by: Alexander Panton
- Succeeded by: Gilbert Fraser
- Constituency: West Province

Personal details
- Born: 28 November 1883 Craigend, Dalmeny, Scotland
- Died: 10 December 1945 (aged 62) Perth, Western Australia, Australia
- Party: Nationalist

George Potter (28 November 1883 – 10 December 1945) was an Australian politician who was a Nationalist Party member of the Legislative Council of Western Australia from 1922 to 1928, representing West Province.

Potter was born in Craigend in Dalmeny, a village near Edinburgh, to Ellen (née Thomson) and John Potter. He attended James Gillespie's High School and Heriot-Watt College, and then joined the British Army, serving in the Boer War. Potter emigrated to Western Australia in 1909, to farm wheat at Bruce Rock. He re-entered the military on the outbreak of the First World War, joining the Australian Imperial Force. In August 1915, while fighting in the Gallipoli Campaign, Potter was wounded in action. He was subsequently repatriated to Australia, and worked at a military hospital in Fremantle until his discharge in February 1917. After the war's end, Potter worked as a hospital secretary. He was elected to parliament in 1922, defeating a sitting Labor member, Alexander Panton, in West Province. He held his seat for a single six-year term before being defeated by Labor's Gilbert Fraser at the 1928 election. After leaving parliament, Potter worked as a business agent until his sudden death in 1945, aged 62. He collapsed in a lift at the Perth GPO, and was rushed to hospital, where he was pronounced dead on arrival.
