= John Veryard =

Australian businessman and politician

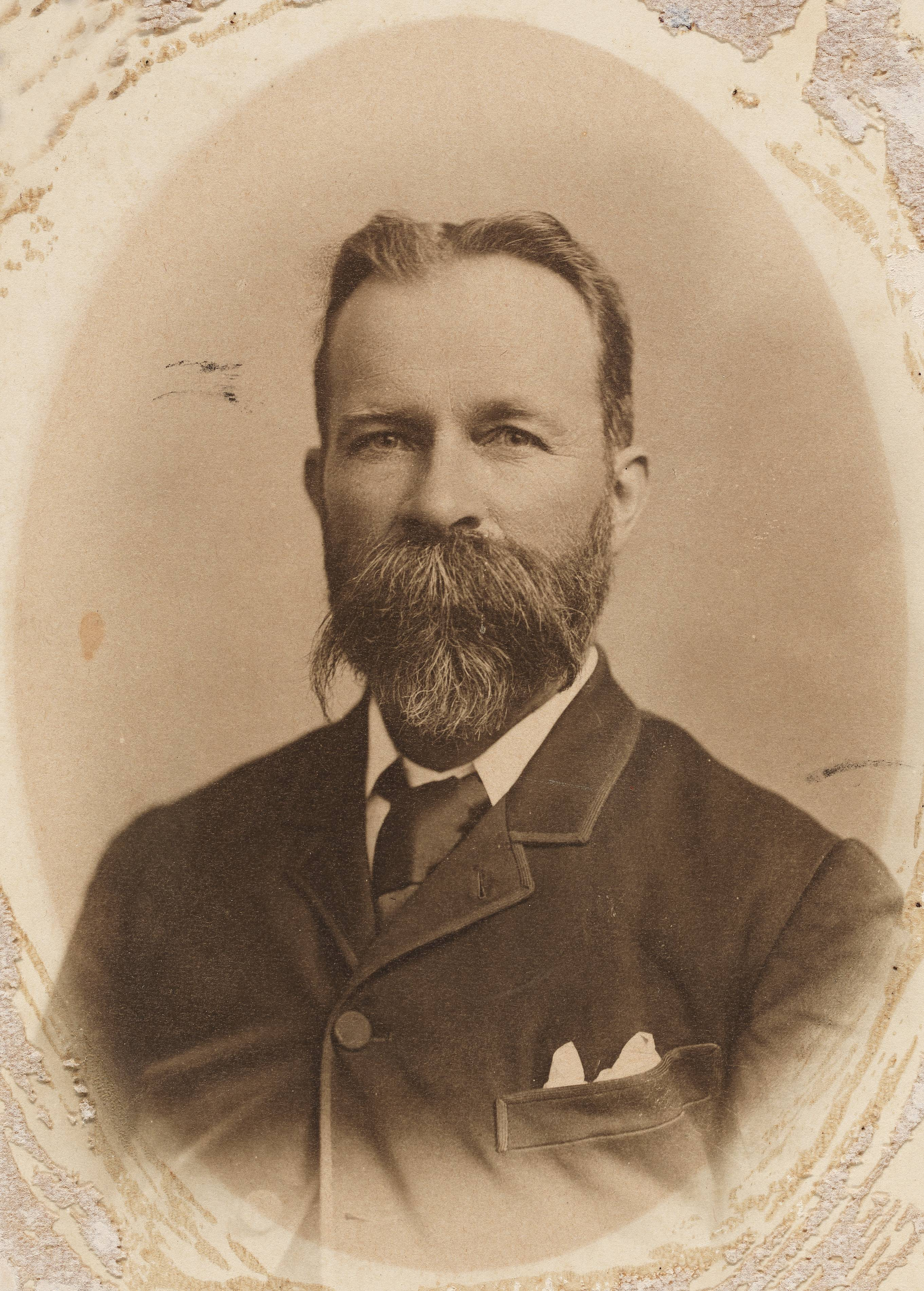

Member of the Legislative Assembly of Western Australia
- In office 27 October 1905 – 11 September 1908
- Preceded by: Frederick Gill
- Succeeded by: Frederick Gill
- Constituency: Balcatta
- In office 21 October 1914 – 12 March 1921
- Preceded by: Frederick Gill
- Succeeded by: Lionel Carter
- Constituency: Geraldton

Personal details
- Born: 14 November 1851 Westminster, London, England
- Died: 5 January 1924 (aged 72) West Perth, Western Australia, Australia
- Party: Liberal (1911–1917); Nationalist (from 1917)

John Veryard (14 November 1851 – 5 January 1924) was an Australian businessman and politician who served as a member of the Legislative Assembly of Western Australia from 1905 to 1908 and from 1914 to 1921.

Veryard was born in London, England, to Jane (née Callcott) and John Besley Charles Veryard. His parents immigrated to Western Australia when he was an infant. After leaving school, Veryard initially worked in the offices of The Inquirer & Commercial News. He later worked for periods as a cabinetmaker, bootmaker, produce merchant, and builder, before taking over his father's bakery business in 1886. Veryard served on the Perth City Council from 1895 to 1900, and was also on the Leederville Municipal Council from 1896 to 1900 and from 1902 to 1905, including as mayor in 1904 and 1905.

At the 1905 state election, Veryard defeated Frederick Gill of the Labor Party in the seat of Balcatta. Gill reclaimed the seat at the 1908 election, and when it was abolished prior the 1911 election beat Veryard in the new seat of Leederville. However, Veryard won Leederville in 1914, and remained in parliament until his retirement at the 1921 state election. Outside of politics, he was prominent in the Orange Order, serving as the organisation's first grand master in Western Australia. Veryard died at his home in West Perth in January 1924, aged 72. He had married Selena Arnold in 1875, with whom he had one son. A grandson, Charles Veryard, became Lord Mayor of Perth.

Parliament of Western Australia
Preceded by Frederick Gill	Member for Balcatta; 1905–1908	Succeeded by Frederick Gill
Preceded by Frederick Gill	Member for Leederville; 1914–1921	Succeeded by Lionel Carter
