= List of mayors of Claremont =

The Town of Claremont is a local government area in Perth, Western Australia. Claremont was originally established on 17 June 1898 as the Municipality of Claremont with a mayor and councillors under the Municipal Institutions' Act 1876. With the passage of the Local Government Act 1960, it became the Town of Claremont effective 1 July 1961.

== Municipality of Claremont ==
Mayor	Term
James King	1898-1899
Joseph Langsford	1899–1901
Sydney Stubbs	1901–1903
H. M. Saunders	1903–1907
T. J. Briggs	1907–1909
Horace Elgar Mofflin	1909–1911
Walter St Clair Brockway	1911–1912
James L. B. Weir	1912–1915
George Philip Stevens	1915–1919
John Thomson	1919–1922
William James Rolfe	1922
Sidney Charles Marriott	1923–1924
John Hobbs	1924–1927
Gustav Ernst Mengler	1927–1939
Edward James Judge	1939–1940
Eric William Gillett	1940–1953
Albert William Crooks	1953–1961

== Town of Claremont ==
Mayor	Term
Albert William Crooks	1961–1966
E. W. Harry Milner	1966–1972
R. E. Packington	1972–1978
B. H. Houston	1978–1985
Peter H. Weygers	1985–1997
Peter J. Olson	1997–2009
Jock Barker	2009–2025
Peter Telford	2025–present
