= Francis Connor =

Australian politician

The Honourable Francis Connor
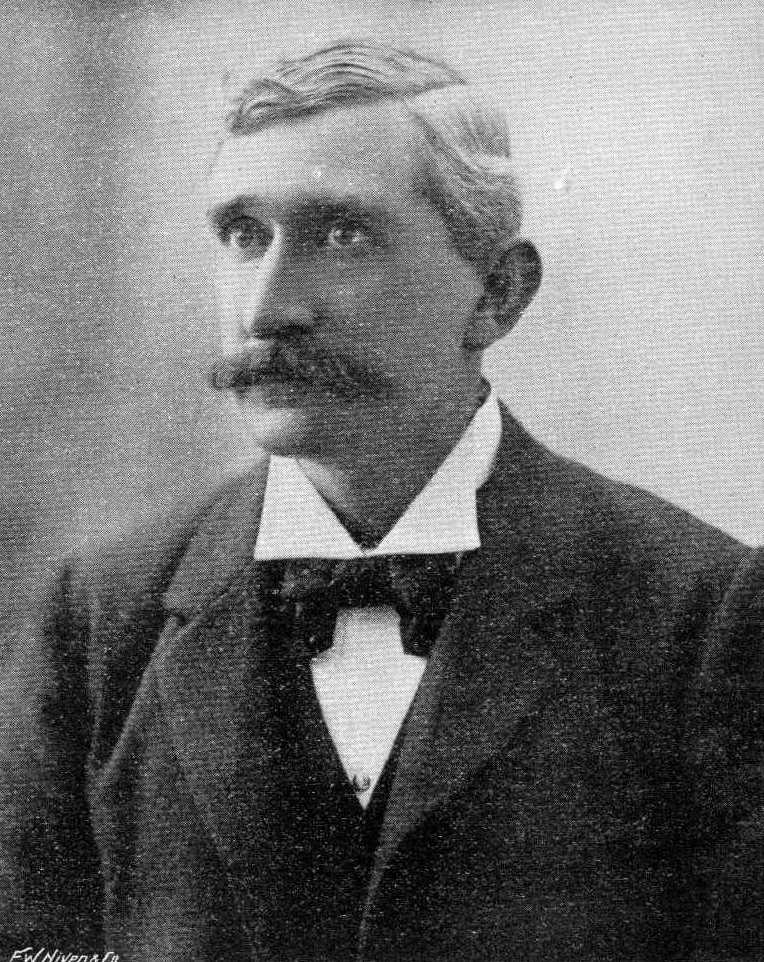

Member of the Legislative Assembly of Western Australia
- In office 20 April 1893 – 28 June 1904
- Preceded by: William Leonard Baker
- Succeeded by: None (abolished)
- Constituency: East Kimberley
- In office 28 June 1904 – 13 November 1905
- Preceded by: None (new creation)
- Succeeded by: Arthur Male
- Constituency: Kimberley

Member of the Legislative Council of Western Australia
- In office 4 June 1906 – 24 August 1916
- Preceded by: Frank Stone
- Succeeded by: George Miles
- Constituency: North Province

Personal details
- Born: 1857 Newry, County Armagh, Ireland
- Died: 24 August 1916 (aged 59) Benger, Western Australia, Australia
- Party: Independent

Francis Connor (1857 – 24 August 1916) was an Australian businessman, pastoralist, and politician who served in both houses of the Parliament of Western Australia, as a member of the Legislative Assembly from 1893 to 1905 and as a member of the Legislative Council from 1906 until his death.

== Early life ==
Connor was born in Newry, County Armagh, Ireland. He arrived in Sydney, Australia, in 1885, and from there went to Wyndham, a small town in Western Australia's Kimberley region. In Wyndham, Connor went into partnership with a schoolmate from Ireland, Denis Doherty, who eventually also entered parliament. Their firm initially supplied goods to the Kimberley goldfields. They later went into the live cattle trade, acquiring two pastoral leases in the Northern Territory (Newry Station and Auvergne Station). In 1897, Connor and Doherty merged their business with that of Michael Durack, forming Connor, Doherty & Durack.

== Politics ==
In 1893, Connor was elected to parliament in a by-election for the seat of East Kimberley, caused by the death of the sitting member, William Baker. He held East Kimberley until it was abolished at the 1904 state election, and thereafter transferred to the seat of Kimberley. Later in 1904, Connor was one of four independents to announce their support for the Labor Party, allowing Henry Daglish to form a minority government (and become the first Premier of Western Australia from the Labor Party). The Labor government fell after just over a year, and Connor was defeated in his seat at the 1905 state election by Arthur Male. He re-entered parliament in June 1906, winning election to the Legislative Council's North Province, and was re-elected to a second six-year term in 1912.

== Death ==
Connor died in office in August 1916 (aged 59). The circumstances of his death were highly unusual, and prompted a coronial inquest. While at his property in Benger, Connor organised to go on a kangaroo hunt with his wife and a friend (a Catholic priest). While loading a gun in his office, the weapon went off, shattering Connor's skull and killing him instantaneously. It was thought that his wife (the only witness) had startled him by opening the office door, and the death was found to be purely accidental. His wife was the sole beneficiary of his will.

== See also ==
- Independent politicians in Australia
