= Electoral district of East Kimberley =

Former electoral district in Western Australia

East Kimberley Western Australia—Legislative Assembly
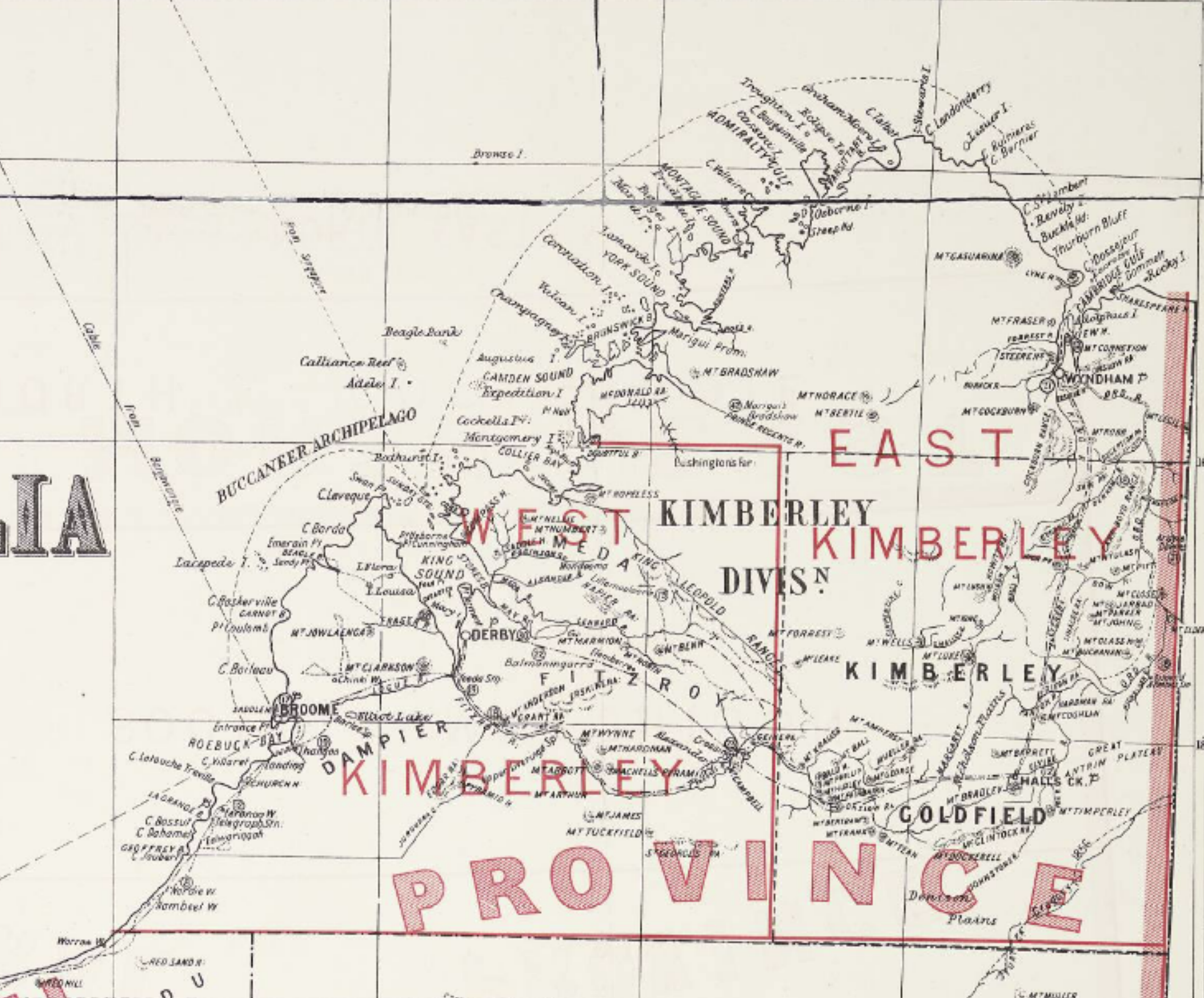
- East and West Kimberley in 1898
- State: Western Australia
- Dates current: 1890–1904
- Namesake: Kimberley

East Kimberley was an electoral district of the Legislative Assembly in the Australian state of Western Australia from 1890 to 1904.

Based in the eastern part of the Kimberley region, the district was one of the original 30 seats contested at the 1890 election. In 1898, its major settlements were Wyndham and Halls Creek; it included the Kimberley Goldfield which had seen a gold rush a few years earlier. It ceased to exist at the 1904 election, at which point it was amalgamated with the district of West Kimberley to form the new district of Kimberley.

== Members ==
Member	Party	Term
William Leonard Baker		1890–1893
Francis Connor	Independent	1893–1904
