= Acacia longiphyllodinea =

Yalgoo

Scientific classification
- Kingdom: Plantae
- Clade: Tracheophytes
- Clade: Angiosperms
- Clade: Eudicots
- Clade: Rosids
- Order: Fabales
- Family: Fabaceae
- Subfamily: Caesalpinioideae
- Clade: Mimosoid clade
- Genus: Acacia
- Species: A. longiphyllodinea

Binomial name
- Acacia longiphyllodinea Maiden
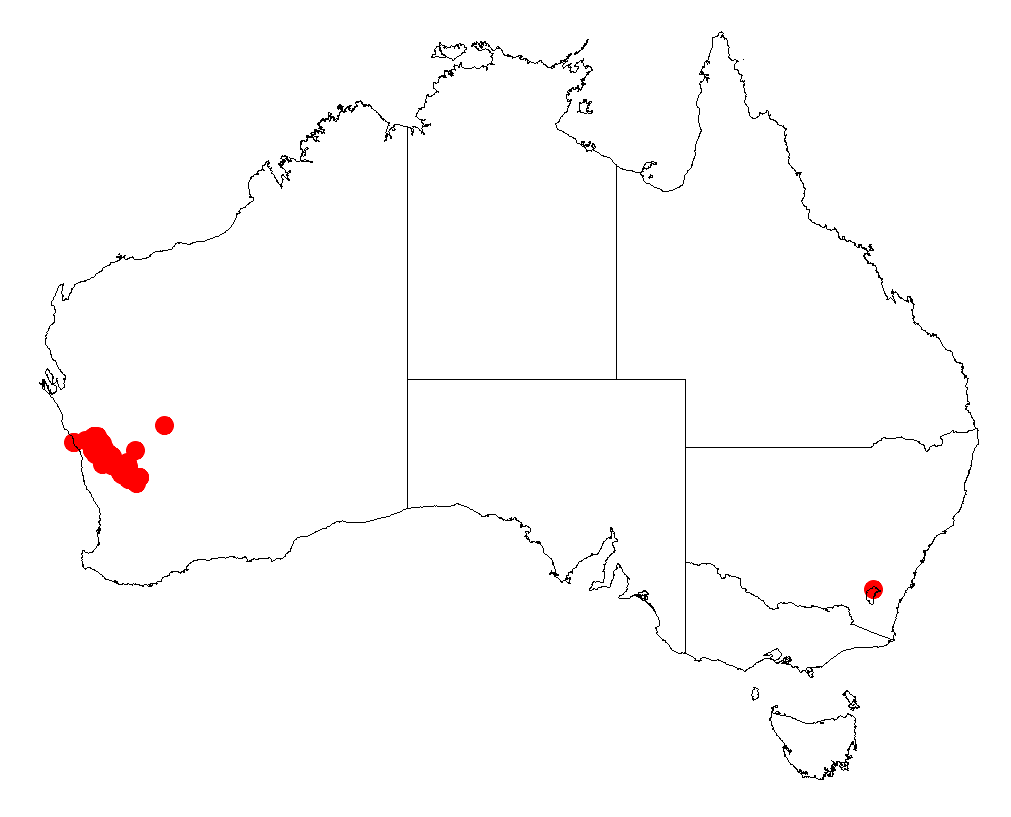
- Occurrence data from AVH

Synonyms
- Racosperma longiphyllodineum (Maiden) Pedley

Species of legume

Acacia longiphyllodinea, commonly known as yalgoo or long-leaved wattle, is a species of flowering plant in the family Fabaceae and is endemic to the southwest of Western Australia. It is an open, wiry shrub, with many striated stems covered with a white powdery bloom, linear, terete phyllodes continuous with rigidly erect branchlets, very dense spikes of golden yellow flowers, and linear, flat, light brown pods.

== Description ==
Acacia longiphyllodinea is an open, wiry, glabrous shrub that typically grows to a height of 1.8–4 m (5 ft 11 in – 13 ft 1 in) and has many striated stems covered with a powdery bloom. Older specimens have dark grey bark that is fissured at the base. The branchlets are slightly flattened towards the ends, brown and often covered with a white, powdery bloom. The phyllodes are rigidly erect, linear, terete, 150–450 mm (5.9–17.7 in) long, 1–1.5 mm (0.039–0.059 in) wide with many striations, leathery, and many veins close together. The flowers are golden yellow and borne in one or two very dense spikes 30–40 mm (1.2–1.6 in) long and 6–10 mm (0.24–0.39 in) wide on stout peduncles 5–20 mm (0.20–0.79 in) long. Flowering occurs from July to September, and the pods are linear, flat, straight or slightly curved, 50–150 mm (2.0–5.9 in) long, 3.5–5 mm (0.14–0.20 in) wide and light brown. The seeds are oblong, about 4 mm (0.16 in) long and dark brown.

== Taxonomy ==
Acacia longiphyllodinea was first formally described in 1917 by Joseph Maiden in the Journal and Proceedings of the Royal Society of New South Wales from specimens collected by Max Koch at Jibberding and Lake Monger in 1905. The specific epithet (longiphyllodinea) means 'long phyllode', the ending "-eus" indicating 'belonging' (to Acacia).

== Distribution and habitat ==
Yalgoo grows on sandplains in low eucalypt woodland from near Geraldton and inland to Yalgoo and south to Bencubbin in the Avon Wheatbelt, Geraldton Sandplains and Yalgoo bioregions of south-western Western Australia.

== See also ==
- List of Acacia species
