= William Leonard Baker =

Australian politician

William Baker

Member of the Legislative Assembly of Western Australia
- In office 20 December 1890 – 7 January 1893
- Succeeded by: Francis Connor
- Constituency: East Kimberley

Personal details
- Born: 16 May 1831 Newport, Monmouthshire, Wales (Note: At the time of Baker's birth, there was ambiguity as to whether the county of Monmouthshire was a part of England or a part of Wales. However, Newport is currently considered to be in Wales.)
- Died: 7 January 1893 (aged 61) Fremantle, Western Australia, Australia

William Leonard Baker (16 May 1831 – 7 January 1893) was an Australian politician who was a member of the Legislative Assembly of Western Australia from 1890 until his death, representing the seat of East Kimberley.

Baker was born in Newport, Wales. He emigrated to Australia in the early 1850s, during the Victorian gold rush, and later went to Queensland, where he was involved in mining ventures in Charters Towers and near the Cape River. Baker came to Western Australia in 1885, during a gold rush in the Kimberley, and opened a store in Wyndham. He was elected to parliament at the 1890 general election, which was the first to be held for the Legislative Assembly. Baker died in Fremantle in January 1893, having suffered from pleurisy and bronchitis for some time. He was the first member of the Legislative Assembly to die in office.

== Notes ==
Parliament of Western Australia
New creation	Member for East Kimberley; 1890–1893	Succeeded by Francis Connor
