= Benger, Western Australia =

Benger
- Town
- Interactive map of Benger
- Coordinates: 33.178°S 115.862°E
- Country: Australia
- State: Western Australia
- LGA: Shire of Harvey
- Location: 153 km (95 mi) from Perth; 13 km (8.1 mi) from Harvey
- Established: 1885

Government
  - State electorate: Murray-Wellington
  - Federal division: Forrest

Area
  - Total: 70.8 km^{2} (27.3 sq mi)

Population
  - Total: 159 (SAL 2021)
- Postcode: 6223

Benger is a locality just north of Brunswick Junction in the South West region of Western Australia.

The South Western Highway runs through the region. It is also a crossing loop on the south-west railway between Armadale and Bunbury.

== History ==
Before European settlement, the region was inhabited by the Pindjarup people, in whose language "Benger" may have meant "swamp" according to some sources (the word Pijar was also used). The explorers Thomas Peel and Stephen Henty travelled through the district in 1835. The area was known as the "flats of Mornington", and some years later, Mornington Siding was established with a hall, school and shop/post office. Sandalwood from the area was used in the Swan River Colony. In 1887, John Partridge founded a dairy in the area, which is still open today as the White Rocks Museum and Dairy. The town was renamed from Mornington to Benger in 1902, although many geographic names in the area (including the creek near the school) bear the original name.

A bushfire broke out in the Benger swamp near the town in January 2013, burning out 300 hectares (741 acres) of farmland.
