= Western Australian Employers' Federation =

Employers organization in Western Australia

The Western Australian Employers' Federation was an employers' organisation in Western Australia between 1913 and 1975.

It was a member of the Employers' Federation of Australia. As an employers advocacy group, the organisation was involved in industrial arbitration on behalf of employers. Office bearers over time also were members of parliament in their careers, including William Hedges, Fergus Darling, and Lionel Carter.

The Federation regularly collaborated with other Western Australian organisations in promoting industrial developments.

The Chamber of Manufacturers of WA, also founded in 1913, merged with the Federation in 1975 to create the Confederation of WA Industry.
