= Lucien Triat =

Australian politician

Member of the Legislative Assembly of Western Australia
- In office 18 March 1939 – 25 March 1950
- Preceded by: Frank Troy
- Succeeded by: None (seat abolished)
- Constituency: Mount Magnet

Personal details
- Born: 31 December 1888 Georgetown, Queensland, Australia
- Died: 3 May 1961 (aged 72) Wembley, Western Australia, Australia
- Party: Labor

Lucien John Triat (31 December 1888 – 3 May 1961) was an Australian trade unionist and politician who was a Labor Party member of the Legislative Assembly of Western Australia from 1939 to 1950, representing the seat of Mount Magnet.

== Early life ==
Triat was born in Georgetown, Queensland, to Ellen (née Shea) and Lucien Caesar Triat. His father, a mining engineer worked at the New Zealand Reef in Queensland, moved the family to Western Australia when he was young. During his childhood, Triat lived for periods in Nullagine, Lawlers, and Marble Bar. After leaving school, he worked in a variety of fields, including as a farmer (at Isseka), a miner (at Baddera and Meekatharra), and an engine driver (at Westonia). Triat became involved in the union movement at a young age, and in 1933 was elected state secretary of the mining division of the Australian Workers' Union, based out of Boulder. He also served on the Boulder Municipal Council from 1933 to 1939.

== Politics ==
Triat served on the ALP district councils for the Murchison (as secretary) and the Eastern Goldfields (as president). He was elected to parliament at the 1939 state election, replacing the retiring Frank Troy in Mount Magnet, a Labor safe seat. Triat increased his majority at the 1943 state election, and in 1947 was elected unopposed. However, his seat was abolished prior to the 1950 election, due to a dwindling enrollment. Instead, Triat contested Labor preselection for the seat of West Perth, a metropolitan electorate. He was successful, but lost to Joseph Totterdell of the Liberal Party at the general election. In January 1955, Triat became chairman of the Lotteries Commission of Western Australia, holding that position until his death in May 1961. He had married Irene Margaret Fisher in 1915, with whom he had three children.

== See also ==
- Members of the Western Australian Legislative Assembly

Parliament of Western Australia
Preceded by Frank Troy	Member for Mount Magnet; 1939–1950	Abolished
