= Frank Troy =

Australian politician

The Honourable Frank Troy

5th Speaker of the Legislative Assembly of Western Australia
- In office 1 November 1911 – 13 February 1917
- Preceded by: Timothy Quinlan
- Succeeded by: Bertie Johnston

Member of the Legislative Assembly of Western Australia
- In office 24 June 1904 – 18 March 1939
- Preceded by: Frank Wallace
- Succeeded by: Lucien Triat
- Constituency: Mount Magnet

Personal details
- Born: 13 October 1877 Pimlico, New South Wales, Australia
- Died: 7 January 1953 (aged 75) Mount Lawley, Western Australia
- Party: Labor

Michael Francis "Frank" Troy (13 October 1877 – 7 January 1953) was an Australian politician who served in the Legislative Assembly of Western Australia from 1904 to 1939. A member of the Labor Party, he was the Speaker of the Legislative Assembly from 1911 to 1917, the first from that party to hold the position. Later in his career, Troy spent long periods as a frontbencher, serving as a minister in the first and second Collier governments, and then in the Willcock government (where he was deputy premier). After leaving parliament, he served as Agent-General for Western Australia from 1939 to 1947.

== Early life and business career ==
Troy's parents were Ellen (née Maloney) and Patrick Troy, both Irish Catholic immigrants from County Tipperary. He was born at Pimlico, New South Wales, the locality on the Richmond River (near Ballina) where his father's farm was located. Troy's father died when he was very young, and his mother subsequently moved her ten children to the nearby town of Wardell, where she ran a store. Initially training as a schoolteacher, Troy left the profession after only two years, and instead worked various jobs in the country. He arrived in Western Australia in 1897 with the intention of prospecting for gold in the colony's Murchison region. There, he became involved in the local trade union movement, serving in leadership roles with both the Australian Workers' Union (AWU) and the Amalgamated Workers' Association (AWA) at various stages. Troy quickly rose to become secretary of the Murchison district AWA branch, succeeding John Holman (who had entered parliament).

== Parliamentary career ==
=== Early years and speakership ===
At the 1904 state election, Troy contested the seat of Mount Magnet for the Labor Party. A resident of Cue at the time of his nomination, his only opponent was a mine manager from the Mount Magnet townsite, who was a Ministerialist (a supporter of the government of Walter James). Aged only 26 at the election, Troy won with 61.26 percent of the vote, replacing Frank Wallace (who did not re-contest) in parliament. When parliament first met after the election, in August, he was appointed assistant secretary to Frederick Gill for the Labor Party, a position which broadly entailed the duties of a whip. Later in the year, in November, Troy was also elected to a one-year term as state general secretary of the AWA.

Troy again faced only a single opponent at the early 1905 election, which had been pre-empted by the defeat of Henry Daglish's minority Labor government. Running against a supporter of Cornthwaite Rason's new government, he increased his majority from the previous year, finishing with 66.15% (although on a much lower turnout). Following the election, Troy was made the Labor Party's chief whip, under the new Leader of the Opposition, Thomas Bath. He (and several other Labor MPs in Goldfields constituencies) went on to be re-elected unopposed at both the 1908 and 1911 elections. Labor, now under the leadership of John Scaddan, won majority government for the first time in 1911, and put forward Troy as their candidate for speaker, who was elected unanimously. The first speaker from the Labor Party, (Note: The position had been filled by an independent, Mathieson Jacoby, during the only preceding Labor government, that of Henry Daglish.) Troy was only 34 when he assumed the speakership, making him, according to a later source, "the youngest member of any Australian parliament to hold that office".

Like almost all future Labor speakers, Troy shunned some of the regalia normally associated with the speakership, first not wearing the traditional wig, and then also dispensing with the gown. On at least one occasion, he also ceased use of the ceremonial mace, which was not received favourably. Nonetheless, Troy was re-elected speaker unanimously after the 1914 election, with his conduct praised by the leaders of all three major parties – Labor's Scaddan, the Liberal Party's Frank Wilson, and the Country Party's James Gardiner. At the election, he had been returned unopposed to his seat for a third consecutive time. After the defeat of the Labor government in July 1916, with Frank Wilson becoming premier for a second time, Troy initially continued on as speaker. However, he stepped down from the post in February 1917, in what he described as "purely a voluntary step", and was replaced by the Country Party's Edward Johnston.

== Later life and death ==
Troy died in Mount Lawley, the Perth suburb in which he had long been resident, in January 1953, after a long illness. He had married Flora Brown Mackinnon in April 1913, when he was 35. It was the first marriage for both of them (she being several years older than him), and the couple never had children, with Flora Troy dying just over a year before her husband.

== Notes ==
Parliament of Western Australia
Preceded by Frank Wallace	Member for Mount Magnet; 1904–1939	Succeeded by Lucien Triat
Preceded by Timothy Quinlan	Speaker of the Legislative Assembly; 1911–1917	Succeeded by Bertie Johnston
Political offices
Preceded by John Scaddan	Minister for Mines; 1924–1927	Succeeded by Selby Munsie
Preceded by Henry Maley	Minister for Agriculture; 1924–1927	Succeeded by Harold Millington
Preceded by William Angwin; Charles Latham	Minister for Lands; 1927–1930; 1933–1939	Succeeded by Charles Latham; Frank Wise
Preceded by William Angwin; Charles Latham	Minister for Immigration; 1927–1930; 1933–1939	Succeeded by Charles Latham; None (abolished)
