= Frank Wallace (politician) =

Australian politician

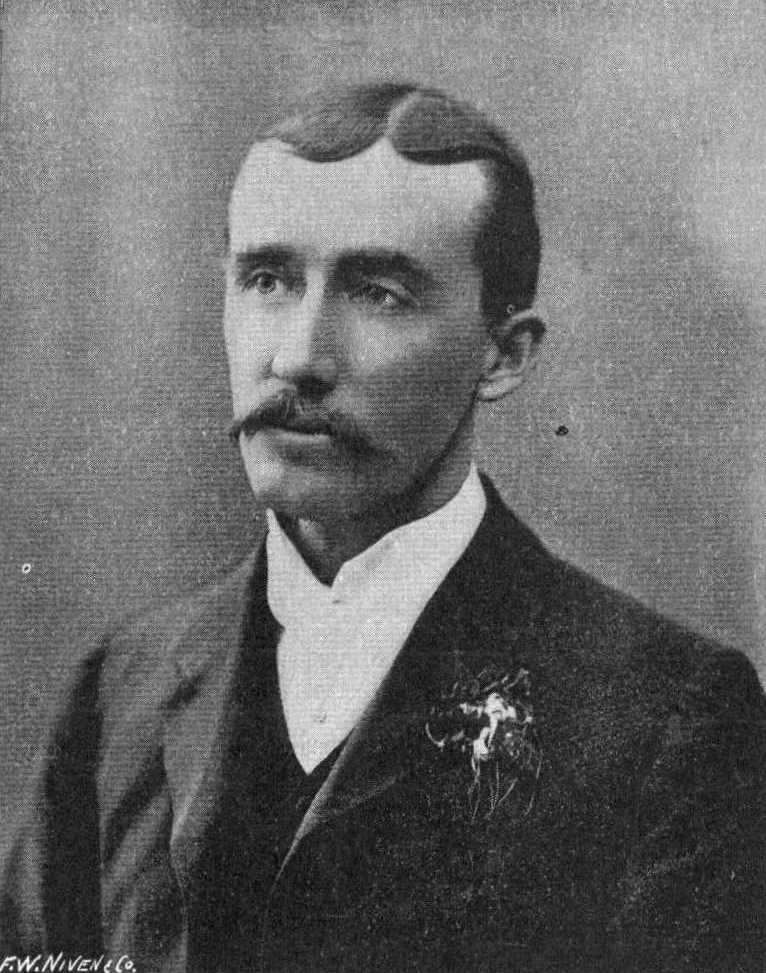

Member of the Legislative Assembly of Western Australia
- In office 7 May 1897 – 24 April 1901
- Preceded by: None (new seat)
- Succeeded by: None (abolished)
- Constituency: Yalgoo
- In office 24 April 1901 – 24 June 1904
- Preceded by: None (new seat)
- Succeeded by: Frank Troy
- Constituency: Mount Magnet

Personal details
- Born: 20 December 1861 near Dalby, Queensland, Australia
- Died: 1 July 1925 (aged 63) Dalkeith, Western Australia, Australia

Francis Patrick Wallace (20 December 1861 – 1 July 1925) was an Australian politician who was a member of the Legislative Assembly of Western Australia from 1897 to 1904.

Wallace was born at Campbells Camp, a locality near Dalby, Queensland. He came to Western Australia in 1886, initially living in the Kimberley. Wallace later went to the Eastern Goldfields, establishing a store in Yalgoo in 1896 (the year it was founded). When the Yalgoo Roads Board was gazetted later in 1896, he was elected as its first chairman.

Retiring as chairman of the roads board, Wallace was elected to parliament at the 1897 general election, winning the newly created seat of Yalgoo. In December 1899, he and another MP, John Conolly, volunteered to serve in the Boer War, enlisting in the West Australian Mounted Infantry. However, Wallace never made it to South Africa, withdrawing shortly before his contingent was about to leave. His business manager had been taken ill, necessitating a return to Yalgoo.

At the 1901 general election, Wallace's seat was abolished, and he successfully transferred to the new seat of Mount Magnet. He did not recontest Mount Magnet at the 1904 election, but later in that year unsuccessfully stood for the Legislative Council, losing to William Patrick in Central Province. In 1906, Wallace left Yalgoo and went to farm in Wagin (in the Great Southern). He later lived in Geraldton, and eventually retired to Perth, dying there in July 1925 (aged 63). He was unmarried.

Parliament of Western Australia
New seat	Member for Yalgoo; 1897–1901	Abolished
New seat	Member for Mount Magnet; 1901–1904	Succeeded by Frank Troy
