= Electoral district of Yalgoo =

Former electoral district in Western Australia

Yalgoo Western Australia—Legislative Assembly
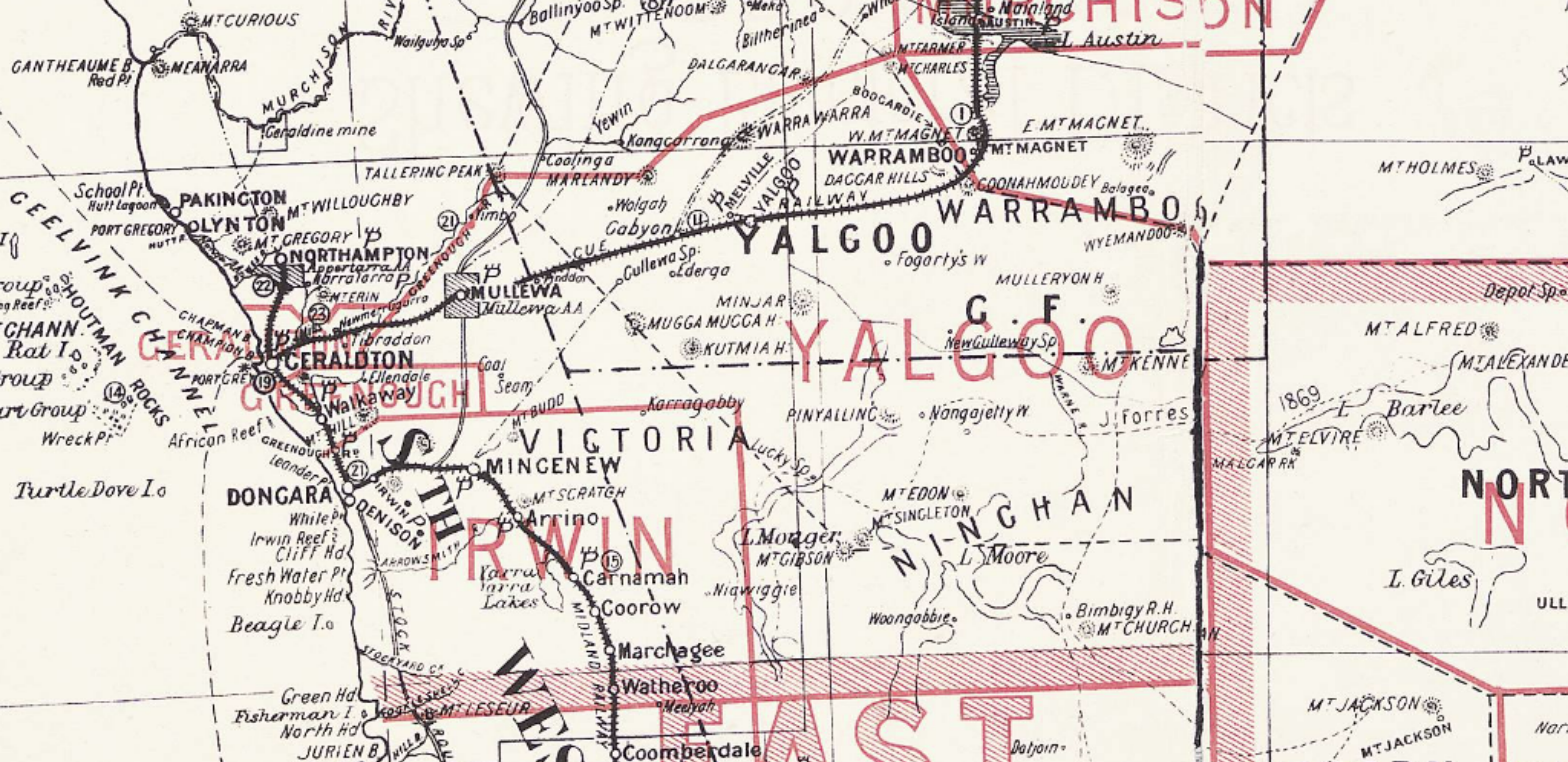
- Yalgoo and surrounds in 1898
- State: Western Australia
- Dates current: 1897–1901
- Namesake: Yalgoo

Yalgoo was an electoral district of the Legislative Assembly in the Australian state of Western Australia from 1897 to 1901.

The district was located in the Western Australian outback. It existed for one term of parliament, and was represented in that time by independent member Frank Wallace.

In 1898, the district was based around the Mullewa–Meekatharra railway, including the towns of Mullewa, Pindar, and Yalgoo, as well as outlying farms and pastoral leases like Gabyon Station.

== Members for Yalgoo ==
Member	Party	Term
Frank Wallace	Independent	1897–1901
