= Electoral district of Leederville =

Former electoral district of Western Australia

Leederville Western Australia—Legislative Assembly
- State: Western Australia
- Dates current: 1911–1962
- Namesake: Leederville

The Electoral district of Leederville was a Legislative Assembly electorate in the state of Western Australia. The district was named for the inner northern Perth suburb of Leederville, which fell within its borders. Starting off as a vast seat covering most of Perth's northwestern hinterland, it shrank in size at various redistributions until, by the time of its abolishment, it was an inner suburban seat able to be absorbed into Wembley and Mount Hawthorn.

Leederville was largely created out of the abolished Balcatta by the Redistribution of Seats Act 1911, and its first member, elected at the 1911 state election, was the former member for Balcatta, Labor's Frederick Gill. He was defeated in the 1914 election by 81 votes by another former Balcatta member, the Liberal candidate John Veryard. The seat was won back for Labor by Harry Millington on his second attempt. Millington went on to serve in the Collier Ministry.

The Redistribution of Seats Act 1929, which took effect at the 1930 election, abolished many Goldfields seats whilst creating a number of new metropolitan seats. Millington ran for and won the new seat of Mount Hawthorn, whilst the Labor member for Menzies, Alexander Panton, and the Nationalist (formerly National Labor) member for Mount Margaret, George Taylor, were in the unusual position of battling for the metropolitan seat of Leederville. Panton won, and in 1938 was elevated to the Ministry under Premier John Willcock.

A redistribution ahead of the 1950 election turned Leederville into an inner metropolitan seat, with the growing outer reaches of the seat becoming the new seat of Wembley Beaches. Following Panton's death on Christmas Day 1951, Labor candidate Ted Johnson won the seat. However, at the 1959 election, he lost to the Liberal Country League's Guy Henn, who held the seat until its abolishment prior to the 1962 election, and then transferred to the new seat of Wembley which contained most of the former seat's residents, the rest of whom had been transferred into the relatively safe Labor seat of Mount Hawthorn.

== Members for Leederville ==
Member	Party	Term
Frederick Gill	Labor	1911–1914
John Veryard	Liberal	1914–1917
John Veryard	Nationalist	1917–1921
Lionel Carter	Nationalist	1921–1924
Harry Millington	Labor	1924–1930
Alexander Panton	Labor	1930–1951
Ted Johnson	Labor	1952–1959
Guy Henn	LCL	1959–1962

== See also ==
- Leederville, Western Australia
