= Lionel Carter =

Australian politician (1890–1968)

Lionel Lewin Carter MC (6 October 1890 – 30 March 1968) was an Australian politician.

Born in Williamstown, Victoria, to Irish-born grocer Thomas Frederick Carter and Emily Jane Knight, he moved to Perth with his family in 1896 and was educated locally and at Perth Technical College. He tried many careers, working as a clerk, blacksmith, steam-hammer driver, optician and trainee chemist before studying theology. He enlisted in the Australian Imperial Force on 7 August 1915; on 21 November of that year he married Amy Edith Norman at Albany. He served on the Western Front with the 48th Battalion, earning his promotion to captain in April 1917 and winning the Military Cross after being the last man to withdraw after an enemy attack near Zonnebeke in Belgium on 12 October. He lost his right eye near Dernancourt in April 1918 and was sent home to Australia. In 1921 he was elected to the Western Australian Legislative Assembly as the Nationalist member for Leederville, but he was defeated in 1924. In 1929 he was appointed executive secretary of the Western Australian Employers Federation, a position he held until 1949. After almost ten years running a motor company at Bunbury he was hired to direct the Western Australian Trade Bureau. He died at Claremont in 1968.
