= Sydney Stubbs =

Australian politician (1861–1953)

The Honourable Sydney Stubbs CMG
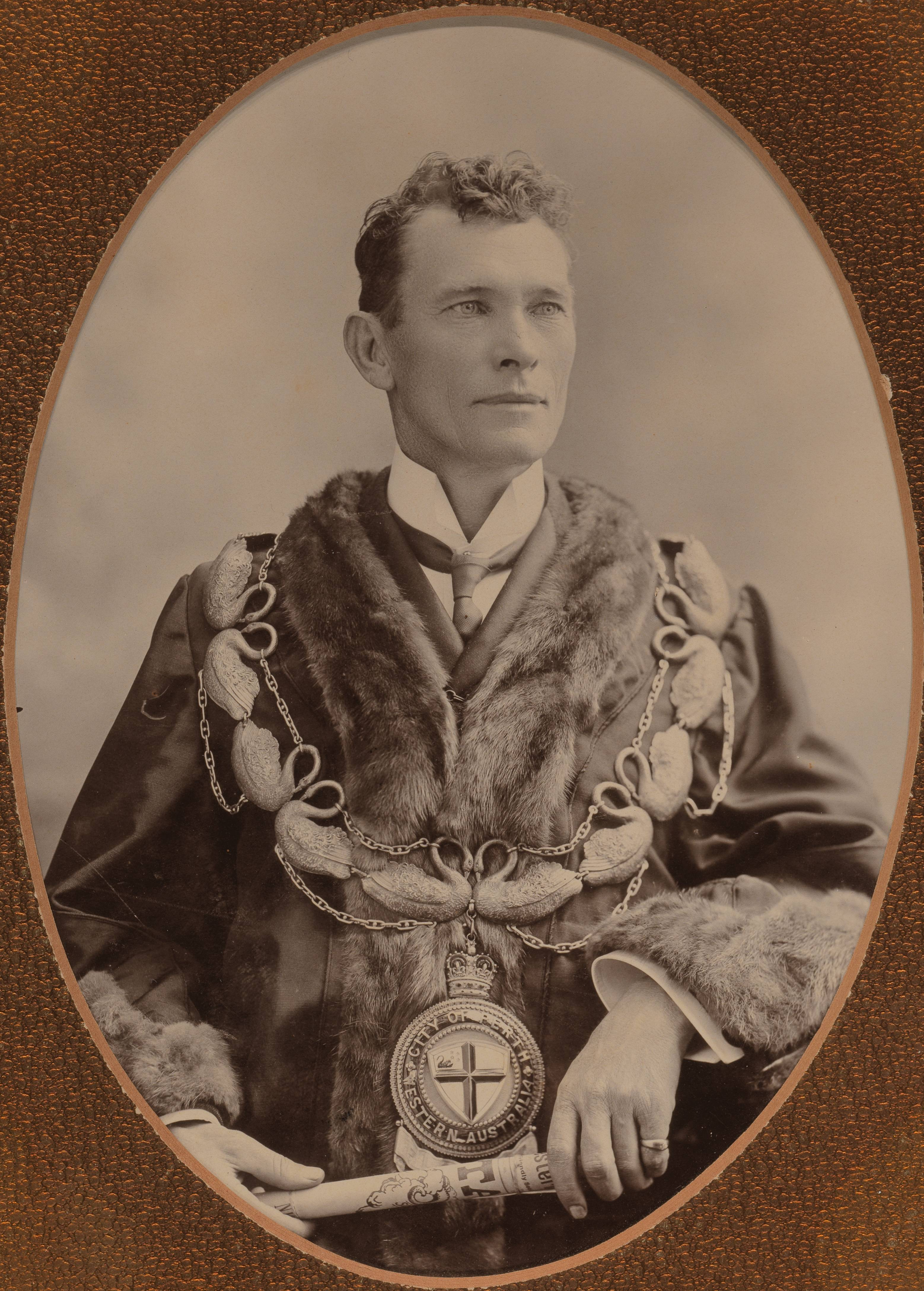
- Stubbs in 1907 as mayor of Perth

10th Speaker of the Legislative Assembly of Western Australia
- In office 30 July 1930 – 17 July 1933
- Preceded by: Thomas Walker
- Succeeded by: Alexander Panton

Member of the Legislative Council of Western Australia
- In office 22 May 1908 – 20 September 1911 Serving with Walter Kingsmill (1908–1910); Joseph Langsford (1908–1911); Douglas Gawler (1910–1911)
- Preceded by: Zebina Lane
- Succeeded by: Frederick Davis
- Constituency: Metropolitan-Suburban Province

Member of the Legislative Assembly of Western Australia
- In office 3 October 1911 – 15 March 1947
- Preceded by: New constituency
- Succeeded by: Crawford Nalder
- Constituency: Wagin

Personal details
- Born: 19 July 1861 Warrnambool, Victoria, Australia
- Died: 30 July 1953 (aged 92) Subiaco, Western Australia, Australia
- Party: Liberal (1911–1917); Country (1917–1924); Nationalist (1924–1927); Country (from 1927)

Sydney Stubbs CMG (19 July 1861 – 30 July 1953) was an Australian politician who served twice in the Parliament of Western Australia: in the Legislative Council from 1908 to 1911, and then in the Legislative Assembly from 1911 to 1947. He was Speaker of the Legislative Assembly from 1930 to 1933, and had been Mayor of Claremont and then Mayor of Perth prior to entering parliament.

== Early life and mayorships ==
Stubbs was born in Warrnambool, Victoria, to Agnes (née Aitken) and William Alexander Stubbs. He worked as a schoolteacher for a time in the late 1870s before securing a position with John Danks & Son, a hardware company with which he was employed from 1879 to 1894, working variously as a clerk, travelling salesman, and engineer. Stubbs arrived in Western Australia in 1895, and with a partner established a hardware firm in Perth, Drake & Stubbs. The firm was eventually bought out by another hardware merchant, Alfred Sandover, in 1907. In 1901, Stubbs (a resident of the suburb of Claremont) was elected mayor of the Claremont Municipality unopposed, replacing Joseph Langsford. In 1903, it was initially reported that would contest the vacancy in the Legislative Council left by the death of Barrington Clarke Wood, but he did not go on to nominate for the election.

Opting not to contest the 1903 Claremont mayoral election, two years later Stubbs ran for Mayor of Perth against Thomas Molloy. On a then-record turnout of almost 8,000 voters, he polled 54.01 percent of the vote, replacing Harry Brown (who did not re-contest) as mayor. The following year, Stubbs was re-elected unopposed, the first mayor since Alexander Forrest in 1899 to be returned in that fashion. He left office in December 1907 without re-contesting, and was replaced by his previous opponent, Molloy. However, Stubbs re-entered the public arena the following year, when he was elected unopposed to the Legislative Council's Metropolitan-Suburban Province, replacing the retiring Zebina Lane.

== Parliament and later life ==
Although he represented a Perth constituency, Stubbs had bought a property near Wagin in 1907 (named Boyalling Estate), and in 1911 he resigned his Legislative Council seat in order to contest the new seat of Wagin in the Legislative Assembly at the 1911 state election. Standing as a "Ministerialist" (a supporter of the government of Frank Wilson), his platform included support for a railway from Wagin to Darkan, an expansion of the Legislative Council franchise, and the abolition of state land tax. Stubbs went on to defeat the Labor candidate, Julius Nenke, with 68.73% of the vote. Wilson's government was defeated, and the Ministerialists that had not been defeated (including Stubbs) subsequently formed a new Liberal Party at the state level, not yet affiliated with the Commonwealth Liberal Party.

Prior to the 1917 state election, Stubbs switched to the Country Party, one of several Liberals in regional seats to do so after the Country Party's foundation in 1913. In 1923, when the Country Party split into two rival factions – the Majority (or Ministerial) Country Party (MCP), supporting the government of James Mitchell, and the Executive (or Opposition) Country Party, opposing it, and backed by the Primary Producers' Association (PPA). Stubbs, who the PPA had refused to endorse, joined the MCP, and was comfortably re-elected under that banner at the 1924 state election. The MCP was merged into the Nationalists following the election (which saw the defeat of Mitchell's government), and the combined group contested the March 1927 election as the "United Party", with Stubbs again comfortably defeating two Country Party candidates. However, his time in that party was short-lived, as he returned to the Country Party fold in December 1927 (alongside Charles Latham).

At the 1930 state election, James Mitchell, leading a Nationalist–Country coalition, was elected to a second term as premier. Stubbs was nominated as the coalition's candidate for Speaker of the Legislative Assembly, and was duly elected to the post by parliament. Known for his habit of returning a full bow to members exiting the chamber, Stubbs was praised by the opposition leader, Philip Collier, for his "impartial manner" in the position. One of his duties as speaker was to entertain visitors to Parliament House, and in that capacity he hosted the English cricket team, captained by Douglas Jardine, that toured Australia during the 1932–33 season – the Bodyline series. Stubbs was elected unopposed at the 1933 election, but Mitchell's government was defeated, and he was consequently replaced as speaker by Labor's Alexander Panton. There would not be another from the coalition side of the house until Charles North was elected in 1947, and it was not until Grant Woodhams was elected in 2008 that the Country Party (now the National Party) provided another speaker.

Stubbs was re-elected unopposed for a second time at the 1936 state election, but at the 1939 election was challenged by three independent candidates. He secured 82.59% on first preferences, with his nearest rival gaining only 13.85%. Stubbs finally announced his retirement in April 1946, but remained in parliament until the 1947 election, by which time he was 85 years old. He consequently set a new record as Western Australia's oldest parliamentarian, which lasted only until September 1949, when it was broken by Sir Norbert Keenan. Stubbs was made a CMG in 1947, for his services to parliament. He died at St John of God Hospital, Subiaco, in July 1953, aged 92. He had married Martha Harriet Jeffery in June 1891, with whom he had four daughters and a son. The couple had celebrated their diamond wedding anniversary in 1951, and his wife died only eight days after him.

== See also ==
- Members of the Western Australian Legislative Assembly
- Members of the Western Australian Legislative Council
