= Arthur Male =

Australian politician

Member of the Legislative Assembly of Western Australia
- In office 13 November 1905 – 9 November 1917
- Preceded by: Francis Connor
- Succeeded by: Michael Durack
- Constituency: Kimberley

Personal details
- Born: 2 March 1870 Bridport, Dorset, England
- Died: 20 January 1946 (aged 75) West Perth, Western Australia, Australia
- Party: Liberal

Arthur Male (2 March 1870 – 20 January 1946) was an Australian businessman and politician who was a member of the Legislative Assembly of Western Australia from 1905 to 1917, representing the seat of Kimberley. He was a minister in the first government of Frank Wilson.

== Early life ==
Male was born in Bridport, Dorset, England, to Martha (née Guppy) and Thomas Male. He emigrated to Australia in 1889, initially working on a farm in Guildford (near Perth). In 1894, Male moved to Broome (a town in the Kimberley), where he managed a pearling business. He later went into partnership with George Streeter, and their firm, Streeter and Male, had diverse commercial interests in the Kimberley, including in the pearling, fishing, and cattle trades. Male was elected to the Broome Road Board in 1901, and later served as mayor of the Broome Municipality from 1908 to 1909.

== Politics ==
At the 1905 state election, Male ran against Francis Connor in the seat of Kimberley, and was successful. He was re-elected at the 1908 election. When Frank Wilson replaced Newton Moore as premier in September 1910, he included Male in his new ministry, as a minister without portfolio. However, Wilson's government was defeated at the 1911 state election, with Labor's John Scaddan succeeding him as premier. Male remained in parliament until the 1917 election, which he did not contest. He ran for re-election as an "independent Nationalist" ten years later, at the 1927 election, but was defeated by the sitting member, Aubrey Coverley.

== Later life ==
Male retired to Perth in 1930, and died there in January 1946, aged 76. He had married Constance Cox in 1900, with whom he had five children.

Parliament of Western Australia
Preceded by Francis Connor	Member for Kimberley; 1905–1917	Succeeded by Michael Durack
