= Frederick Gill =

Australian politician

Member of the Legislative Assembly of Western Australia
- In office 28 June 1904 – 27 October 1905
- Preceded by: None (new seat)
- Succeeded by: John Veryard
- Constituency: Balcatta
- In office 11 September 1908 – 3 October 1911
- Preceded by: John Veryard
- Succeeded by: None (abolished)
- Constituency: Balcatta
- In office 3 October 1911 – 21 October 1914
- Preceded by: None (new seat)
- Succeeded by: John Veryard
- Constituency: Leederville

Personal details
- Born: 15 March 1862 Burra, South Australia, Australia
- Died: 17 April 1936 (aged 74) Morawa, Western Australia, Australia
- Party: Labor (to 1914); Country (1921)

Frederick Gill (15 March 1862 – 17 April 1936) was an Australian politician who was a Labor Party member of the Legislative Assembly of Western Australia from 1904 to 1905 and again from 1908 to 1914.

Gill was born in Burra, South Australia, to Eliza Jane (née Binney) and Joseph Gill. He left school at an early age to work in the Moonta copper mines, and later worked as an apprentice blacksmith (in Port Augusta) and railway porter (in Hawker). Gill moved to Western Australia in 1894, and found work with Western Australian Government Railways. He first stood for parliament at the 1902 West Perth by-election (caused by the death of the premier, George Leake), and placed second to Charles Moran, ahead of four other candidates. At the 1904 state election, Gill won the newly created seat of Balcatta. He was defeated by John Veryard at the 1905 election, but reclaimed the seat in 1908, having worked as a milkman between elections.

Balcatta was abolished prior to the 1911 state election, and Gill transferred to the new seat of Leederville. He was narrowly defeated at the 1914 election, with the winning candidate being John Veryard. He and Veryard were running against each other for the fourth consecutive time. After leaving parliament, Gill bought a property in Morawa (a small town in the Mid West), where he farmed wheat. He contested the seat of Irwin at the 1921 election, running for the Country Party, but placed only fourth out of seven candidates. Gill died in Morawa in April 1936, aged 74. He had married Elizabeth Prisk in 1892, with whom he had two sons.

Parliament of Western Australia
Preceded by None (new seat); John Veryard	Member for Balcatta; 1904–1905; 1908–1911	Succeeded by John Veryard; None (abolished)
New seat	Member for Leederville; 1911–1914	Succeeded by John Veryard
