= John Mullany =

Australian politician

John Francis Mullany (31 March 1873 – 4 November 1926) was an Australian politician. Born in Victoria, he moved to Western Australia in 1896. He was the member for Menzies in the Western Australian Legislative Assembly from 1911 to 1924, representing the Labor Party until 1917 and the National Labor Party thereafter.
