= Electoral district of Mount Magnet =

Former electoral district in Western Australia

Mount Magnet Western Australia—Legislative Assembly
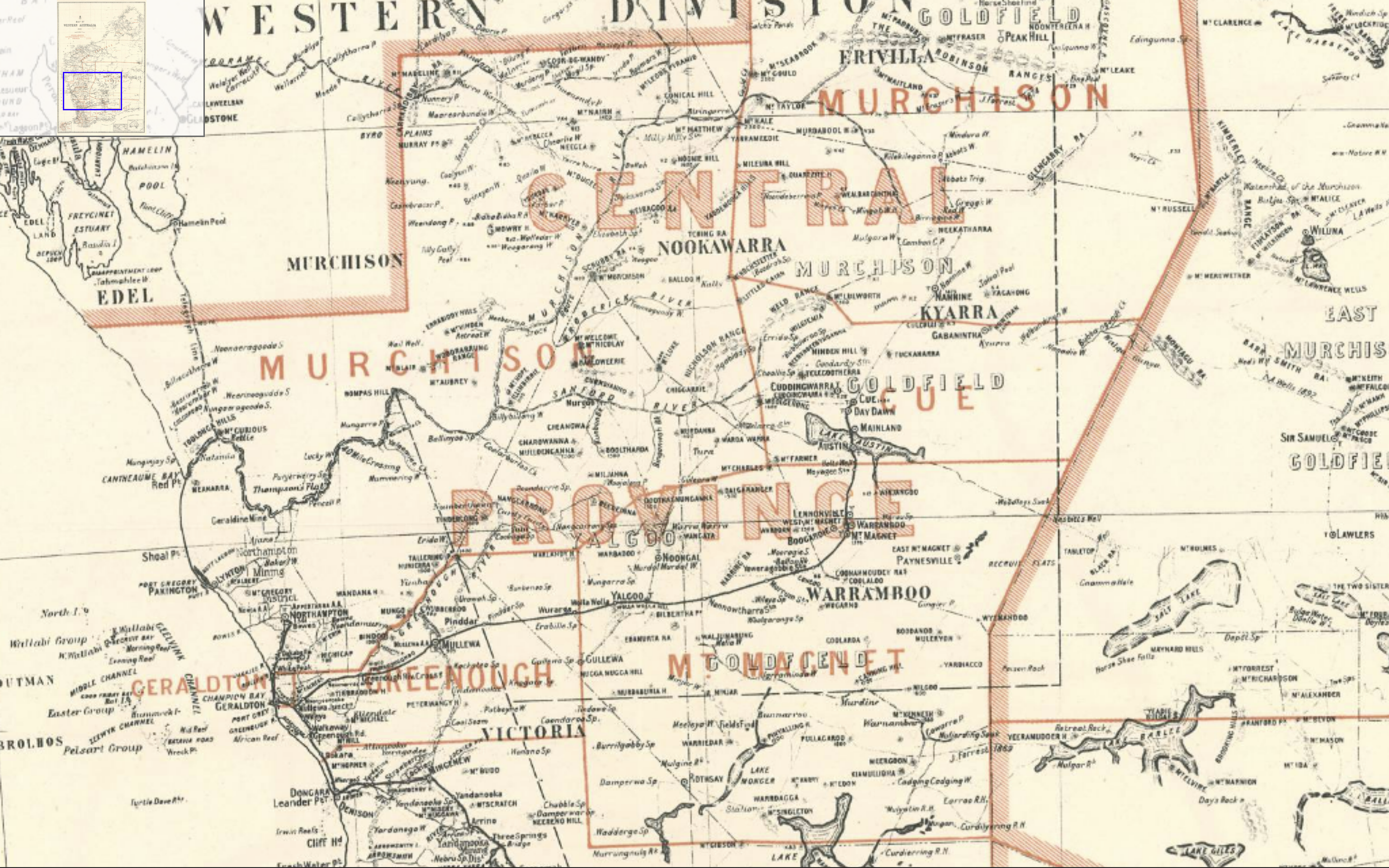
- Mount Magnet and surrounds in 1900
- State: Western Australia
- Dates current: 1901–1950
- Namesake: Mount Magnet

Mount Magnet was an electoral district of the Legislative Assembly in the Australian state of Western Australia from 1901 to 1950. It replaced the former pre-federation seat of Yalgoo (1897-1901)

The district was based on the outback town of Mount Magnet. Upon its creation in 1900 it included a number of other settlements on the Mullewa–Meekatharra railway, such as Yalgoo, Yoweragabbie, Lennonville, and Boogardie, as well as the remote settlements of Rothsay and Paynesville and various pastoral leases. Following the general shift to labor in 1904, the seat was held at all times by the Labor Party.

== Members ==
Members	Party	Term
Frank Wallace	Opposition	1901–1904
Frank Troy	Labor	1904–1939
Lucien Triat	Labor	1939–1950
