= 1914 Western Australian state election =

State election in Western Australia in 1914

- 21 October 1914

All 50 seats in the Western Australian Legislative Assembly
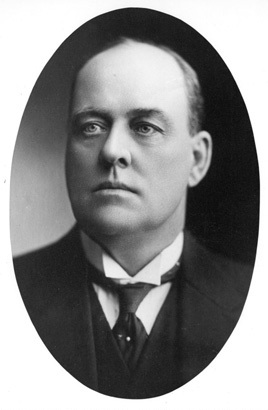

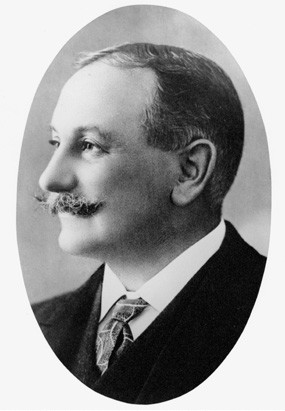

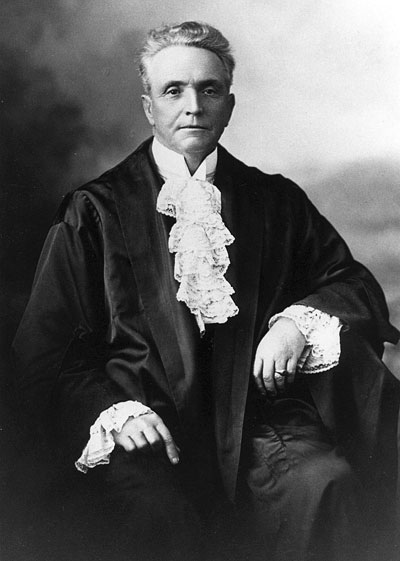
	First party	Second party	Third party
Leader	John Scaddan	Frank Wilson	James Gardiner
Party	Labor	Liberal	Country
Leader since	3 August 1910	16 September 1910	21 October 1914
Leader's seat	Brown Hill-Ivanhoe	Sussex	Irwin
Last election	34 seats	16 seats	0 seats
Seats won	26 seats	16 seats	8 seats
Seat change	▼8	0	▲8
Percentage	42.12%	43.91%	13.98%
Swing	▼10.42	▼0.89	▲13.98
Premier before election
John Scaddan
Labor
Elected Premier
John Scaddan
Labor

Elections were held in the state of Western Australia on 21 October 1914 to elect 50 members to the Western Australian Legislative Assembly. The Labor party, led by Premier John Scaddan, retained government against the opposition conservative Liberal Party led by Opposition Leader Frank Wilson, though with only the barest of majorities. The election also saw the emergence of the Western Australian Country Party, which had been formed at a conference of the Farmers and Settlers Association the previous year to fight for rural interests, and won eight seats at the election.

The fragility of the Labor Party's majority was demonstrated when, a year later, Labor member Joseph Gardiner's seat was declared vacant on account of his non-attendance and a Liberal was elected in his stead, and Labor became a minority government when on 18 December 1915, Bertie Johnston resigned from the Labor Party and became an independent. On 27 July 1916, the Scaddan Ministry was defeated and Wilson became the new Premier.

== Key dates ==
Date	Event
29 September 1914	The Parliament was dissolved.
30 September 1914	Writs were issued by the Governor to proceed with an election.
21 October 1914	Polling day, between the hours of 8am and 6pm.
4 November 1914	Polling day in the seats of Pilbara and Gascoyne.
11 November 1914	Polling day in the seats of Roebourne and Kimberley.
23 November 1914	The Scaddan Ministry was reconstituted.
3 December 1914	The new session of Parliament was convened.

== Results ==
Western Australian state election, 21 October 1914 Legislative Assembly << 1911–1917 >>
Enrolled voters	168,546^{[1]}				
Votes cast	96,605		Turnout	57.32	–17.56
Informal votes	1,127		Informal	1.17	–0.24
Summary of votes by party
Party	Primary votes	%	Swing	Seats	Change
Labor	40,205	42.12	–10.42	26^{[1]}	– 8
Liberal	41,929	43.91	–0.89	16	± 0
Country	13,344	13.98	+13.98	8	+ 8
Total	95,478			50	

Notes:

^{1} The Labor Party's total of 26 seats includes 12 which were uncontested, representing 39,731 of the 214,741 enrolled voters. The Liberal and Country parties won one seat each uncontested—the Liberal member (Arthur Male, Kimberley) representing 1,663 enrolled voters, and the Country member (Alfred Piesse, Electoral district of Toodyay) representing 4,801 enrolled voters.

== See also ==
- Members of the Western Australian Legislative Assembly, 1911–1914
- Members of the Western Australian Legislative Assembly, 1914–1917
