= 1911 Western Australian state election =

State election in Western Australia in 1911

- 3 October 1911

All 50 seats in the Western Australian Legislative Assembly
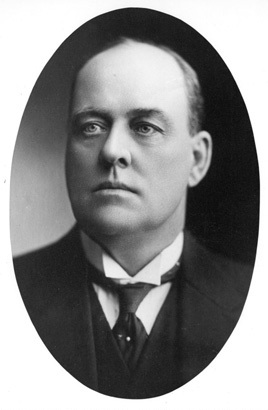

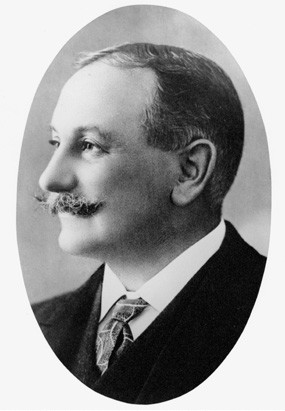
	First party	Second party
Leader	John Scaddan	Frank Wilson
Party	Labor	Ministerialist
Leader since	3 August 1910	16 September 1910
Leader's seat	Brown Hill-Ivanhoe	Sussex
Last election	22 seats	28 seats
Seats won	34 seats	16 seats
Seat change	▲12	▼12
Percentage	52.64%	44.80%
Swing	▲14.73	▼16.82
Premier before election
Frank Wilson
Ministerialist
Elected Premier
John Scaddan
Labor

Elections were held in the state of Western Australia on 3 October 1911 to elect 50 members to the Western Australian Legislative Assembly. The Labor Party, led by Opposition Leader John Scaddan, defeated the conservative Ministerialist government led by Premier Frank Wilson. In doing so, Scaddan achieved Labor's first absolute majority on the floor of the Assembly and, with 68% of the seats (34 of 50), set a record for Labor's biggest majority in Western Australia. The record would stand for nearly 106 years until Labor won 69% of seats (41 of 59) at the 2017 election. At the time, it was also the worst defeat of a sitting government in Western Australia's history, also since outdone by the 2017 election.

The result came as something of a surprise to many commentators and particularly to the Ministerialists, as they went to an election for the first time as a single grouping backed by John Forrest's Western Australian Liberal League, under a new system of compulsory preferential voting and new electoral boundaries both of which had been passed by Parliament earlier in the year despite ardent Labor opposition.

The 1911 election is considered by political historians such as Brian de Garis and David Black to mark the end of the first phase of the development of party politics in Western Australia, which had begun with the granting of responsible government to the then British colony in 1890. Labor held onto government with a one-seat majority in the following 1914 election but lost power in 1916 after losing a by-election and after another member left the Labor Party to sit as an Independent.

The Scaddan government was characterised by its involvement in a number of State-owned manufacturing and service businesses on the back of a relatively sluggish economy. The Government Trading Concerns Act 1912 saw it establishing and running the State Brickworks, the State Saw Mills, the State Implement Works, the State Shipping Service, the State Hotels, the State Quarry at Boya as well as meatworks, ferries and tramways.

== Results ==
Western Australian state election, 3 October 1911 Legislative Assembly << 1908–1914 >>
Enrolled voters	122,375^{[1]}				
Votes cast	91,630		Turnout	74.88	+8.48
Informal votes	1,287		Informal	1.40	+0.19
Summary of votes by party
Party	Primary votes	%	Swing	Seats	Change
Labor	47,558	52.64	+14.73	34^{[1]}	+ 12
Ministerialist^{[2]}	40,472	44.80	–16.82	16	– 12
Independent	2,313	2.56	+2.09	0	± 0
Total	90,343			50	

Notes:

^{1} The Labor Party's total of 34 seats includes 10 which were uncontested, representing 30,270 of the 152,645 enrolled voters.
^{2} The Ministerialist group (whose elected members formed the Liberal Party soon after the election) stood 65 candidates for a total of 38 seats - notably five in the Moore district and four in Canning.

== See also ==
- Members of the Western Australian Legislative Assembly, 1908–1911
- Members of the Western Australian Legislative Assembly, 1911–1914
