= Western Australian Liberal Party (1911–1917) =

- Leader: Frank Wilson
- Deputy Leader: Henry Lefroy
- Founded: 1911
- Dissolved: 1917
- Preceded by: Ministerialist Party
- Succeeded by: Nationalist Party
- Ideology: Liberalism; Conservatism
- Political position: Centre-right

The Western Australian Liberal Party was a political party which existed from 1911 until 1917 in the Australian state of Western Australia.

== Background ==
The Party, which had its roots in various earlier political movements, came together in the period immediately prior to the 1911 state election under the guidance of Sir John Forrest, the Federal member for Swan and former premier of Western Australia, and other leading political figures in the State. It was assembled in response to the solid organisation of the Labor Party and had the aim of assisting Ministerial members in winning seats and retaining power in the Western Australian Legislative Assembly. The Party did not involve itself in Federal politics, although many of its members were also associated with the Commonwealth Liberal Party and assisted Liberal candidates and members from Western Australia in that capacity. The massive defeat of the Ministerial faction by Labor in that election resulted in what remained of the faction formally joining the Liberal Party, which became the first organised non-Labor movement in the State and was a precursor to the Nationalist Party and, later, the modern Liberal Party of Australia (Western Australian Division).

== Leadership ==
The party was led for its entire duration in Parliament by Frank Wilson, who served as Opposition Leader until 27 July 1916, and premier thereafter. By June 1917, the party had been disbanded and fully subsumed into the Nationalist Party.
