= Results of the 1927 Western Australian state election (Legislative Assembly) =

Western Australian state election, 26 March 1927 Legislative Assembly << 1924–1930 >>
Enrolled voters	194,087^{[1]}				
Votes cast	142,506		Turnout	73.42%	+11.05%
Informal votes	2,000		Informal	1.40%	+0.24%
Summary of votes by party
Party	Primary votes	%	Swing	Seats	Change
Labor	63,687	45.33%	+4.94%	27	± 0
United Party	51,774	36.85%	–1.71%	16	± 0
Country	22,439	15.97%	+3.89%	7	+ 1
Independent	1,803	1.28%	–3.23%	0	± 0
Other	803	0.57%	*	0	± 0
Total	140,506			50	

This is a list of electoral district results of the 1927 Western Australian election.

== Results by electoral district ==
=== Albany ===
1927 Western Australian state election: Albany
Party	Candidate	Votes	%	±%
Labor	Arthur Wansbrough	2,321	56.9	+34.8
Country	Archibald Booth	1,758	43.1	+43.1
Total formal votes		4,079	99.0	+1.1
Informal votes		40	1.0	−1.1
Turnout		4,119	77.0	+12.4
Labor hold		Swing	N/A	

=== Avon ===
1927 Western Australian state election: Avon
Party	Candidate	Votes	%	±%
Country	Harry Griffiths	2,143	59.7	+35.1
Labor	Patrick Coffey	1,449	40.3	−4.6
Total formal votes		3,565	99.2	+0.9
Informal votes		27	0.8	−0.9
Turnout		3,619	69.1	+8.1
Country hold		Swing	+9.2	

=== Beverley ===
1927 Western Australian state election: Beverley
Party	Candidate	Votes	%	±%
Country	Charles Wansbrough	968	52.8	+11.8
Nationalist	James Mann	866	47.2	+3.0
Total formal votes		1,834	99.2	+0.5
Informal votes		15	0.8	−0.5
Turnout		1,849	72.7	+15.4
Country hold		Swing	+2.1	

=== Boulder ===
1927 Western Australian state election: Boulder
Party	Candidate	Votes	%	±%
Labor	Philip Collier	unopposed		
Labor hold		Swing		

=== Brownhill-Ivanhoe ===
1927 Western Australian state election: Brownhill-Ivanhoe
Party	Candidate	Votes	%	±%
Labor	John Lutey	unopposed		
Labor hold		Swing		

=== Bunbury ===
1927 Western Australian state election: Bunbury
Party	Candidate	Votes	%	±%
Labor	Frederick Withers	1,916	59.8	+13.0
Nationalist	Les Craig	674	21.0	−17.2
Nationalist	George Clarke	616	19.2	+19.2
Total formal votes		3,206	99.1	+0.7
Informal votes		30	0.9	−0.7
Turnout		3,236	87.6	+13.4
Labor hold		Swing	N/A	

- Preferences were not distributed.

=== Canning ===
1927 Western Australian state election: Canning
Party	Candidate	Votes	%	±%
Labor	Alexander Clydesdale	6,815	60.0	−9.8
Nationalist	Herbert Wells	4,549	40.0	+9.8
Total formal votes		11,364	98.8	−0.5
Informal votes		138	1.2	+0.5
Turnout		11,502	66.3	+16.6
Labor hold		Swing	−9.8	

=== Claremont ===
1927 Western Australian state election: Claremont
Party	Candidate	Votes	%	±%
Nationalist	Charles North	4,029	57.0	+23.1
Labor	Theodore Morgan	3,036	43.0	+6.4
Total formal votes		7,065	99.3	+0.7
Informal votes		50	0.7	−0.7
Turnout		7,115	66.3	−1.7
Nationalist hold		Swing	−1.8	

=== Collie ===
1927 Western Australian state election: Collie
Party	Candidate	Votes	%	±%
Labor	Arthur Wilson	unopposed		
Labor hold		Swing		

=== Coolgardie ===
1927 Western Australian state election: Coolgardie
Party	Candidate	Votes	%	±%
Labor	George Lambert	477	69.9	−30.1
Nationalist	William Vale	205	30.1	+30.1
Total formal votes		682	99.3	
Informal votes		5	0.7	
Turnout		687	72.4	
Labor hold		Swing	N/A	

=== Cue ===
1927 Western Australian state election: Cue
Party	Candidate	Votes	%	±%
Labor	Thomas Chesson	unopposed		
Labor hold		Swing		

=== East Perth ===
1927 Western Australian state election: East Perth
Party	Candidate	Votes	%	±%
Labor	James Kenneally	3,197	53.5	−1.4
Nationalist	Charles Bull	1,104	18.5	−10.5
Nationalist	Thomas Ferguson	1,081	18.1	+1.9
Nationalist	Gerald Hartrey	597	10.0	+10.0
Total formal votes		5,979	98.0	−0.8
Informal votes		124	2.0	+0.8
Turnout		6,103	75.8	+14.5
Labor hold		Swing	N/A	

- Preferences were not distributed.

=== Forrest ===
1927 Western Australian state election: Forrest
Party	Candidate	Votes	%	±%
Labor	May Holman	unopposed		
Labor hold		Swing		

=== Fremantle ===
1927 Western Australian state election: Fremantle
Party	Candidate	Votes	%	±%
Labor	Joseph Sleeman	1,867	64.3	+6.4
Nationalist	Richard Rennie	608	20.9	−21.2
Nationalist	Donald Sinclair	431	14.8	+14.8
Total formal votes		2,906	96.9	−1.5
Informal votes		94	3.1	+1.5
Turnout		3,000	79.1	+15.3
Labor hold		Swing	N/A	

- Preferences were not distributed.

=== Gascoyne ===
1927 Western Australian state election: Gascoyne
Party	Candidate	Votes	%	±%
Nationalist	Edward Angelo	613	58.8	+3.2
Labor	William Willesee	430	41.2	−3.2
Total formal votes		1,043	98.7	−0.6
Informal votes		14	1.3	+0.6
Turnout		1,057	76.2	+8.0
Nationalist hold		Swing	+3.2	

=== Geraldton ===
1927 Western Australian state election: Geraldton
Party	Candidate	Votes	%	±%
Labor	John Willcock	1,513	69.2	−30.8
Country	Charles Counsel	675	30.8	+30.8
Total formal votes		2,188	98.6	
Informal votes		31	1.4	
Turnout		2,219	77.4	
Labor hold		Swing	N/A	

=== Greenough ===
1927 Western Australian state election: Greenough
Party	Candidate	Votes	%	±%
Labor	Maurice Kennedy	1,191	47.7	+3.6
Country	Charles Smith	661	26.5	+6.7
Nationalist	Henry Maley	646	25.9	−10.2
Total formal votes		2,498	98.4	−0.7
Informal votes		40	1.6	+0.7
Turnout		2,538	80.9	+13.8
Two-party-preferred result
Labor	Maurice Kennedy	1,290	51.6	+1.0
Country	Charles Smith	1,208	48.4	−1.0
Labor hold		Swing	+1.0	

=== Guildford ===
1927 Western Australian state election: Guildford
Party	Candidate	Votes	%	±%
Labor	William Johnson	4,951	64.1	+8.3
Nationalist	Hubert Parker	2,768	35.9	−8.3
Total formal votes		7,719	99.3	−0.2
Informal votes		55	0.7	+0.2
Turnout		7,774	71.9	+0.7
Labor hold		Swing	+8.3	

=== Hannans ===
1927 Western Australian state election: Hannans
Party	Candidate	Votes	%	±%
Labor	Selby Munsie	422	74.7	−25.3
Ind. Nationalist	Branwell Saunders	143	25.3	+25.3
Total formal votes		565	99.1	
Informal votes		5	0.9	
Turnout		570	86.5	
Labor hold		Swing	N/A	

=== Irwin ===
1927 Western Australian state election: Irwin
Party	Candidate	Votes	%	±%
Nationalist	Charles Maley	1,327	55.4	+9.8
Country	John Stratton	1,070	44.6	−9.8
Total formal votes		2,397	99.4	+1.2
Informal votes		15	0.6	−1.2
Turnout		2,412	64.2	+4.2
Nationalist hold		Swing	−5.9	

=== Kalgoorlie ===
1927 Western Australian state election: Kalgoorlie
Party	Candidate	Votes	%	±%
Labor	James Cunningham	1,509	52.5	−10.2
Nationalist	George Rainsford	898	31.3	+31.3
Independent	James Cummins	466	16.2	+16.2
Total formal votes		2,873	98.7	−0.9
Informal votes		37	1.3	+0.9
Turnout		2,910	86.3	+21.5
Labor hold		Swing	N/A	

- Preferences were not distributed.

=== Kanowna ===
1927 Western Australian state election: Kanowna
Party	Candidate	Votes	%	±%
Labor	Thomas Walker	unopposed		
Labor hold		Swing		

=== Katanning ===
1927 Western Australian state election: Katanning
Party	Candidate	Votes	%	±%
Country	Alec Thomson	2,246	70.7	+5.5
Labor	David Parker	931	29.3	−5.5
Total formal votes		3,177	99.1	−0.3
Informal votes		28	0.9	+0.3
Turnout		3,205	70.7	+6.6
Country hold		Swing	+5.5	

=== Kimberley ===
1927 Western Australian state election: Kimberley
Party	Candidate	Votes	%	±%
Labor	Aubrey Coverley	431	63.7	+30.2
Ind. Nationalist	Arthur Male	144	21.3	+21.3
Ind. Nationalist	Patrick Percy	102	15.1	+15.1
Total formal votes		677	98.1	−0.2
Informal votes		13	1.9	+0.2
Turnout		690	64.0	−3.5
Labor hold		Swing	N/A	

- Preferences were not distributed.

=== Leederville ===
1927 Western Australian state election: Leederville
Party	Candidate	Votes	%	±%
Labor	Harry Millington	5,000	55.4	+2.2
Nationalist	John Scaddan	3,320	36.8	−10.0
Ind. Nationalist	Christina Blake	711	7.9	+7.9
Total formal votes		9,031	97.4	−1.9
Informal votes		243	2.6	+1.9
Turnout		9,274	77.9	+20.2
Labor hold		Swing	N/A	

- Preferences were not distributed.

=== Menzies ===
1927 Western Australian state election: Menzies
Party	Candidate	Votes	%	±%
Labor	Alexander Panton	134	59.8	−0.5
Nationalist	Dick Ardagh	57	25.5	+25.5
Nationalist	Albert Faul	33	14.7	+14.7
Total formal votes		224	98.2	−1.6
Informal votes		4	1.8	+1.6
Turnout		228	86.0	−1.4
Labor hold		Swing	N/A	

- Preferences were not distributed.

=== Moore ===
1927 Western Australian state election: Moore
Party	Candidate	Votes	%	±%
Country	Percy Ferguson	1,439	60.6	+21.9
Nationalist	James Denton	935	39.4	−13.7
Total formal votes		2,344	98.7	+1.0
Informal votes		30	1.3	−1.0
Turnout		2,404	64.8	+10.8
Country gain from Nationalist		Swing	N/A	

=== Mount Leonora ===
1927 Western Australian state election: Mount Leonora
Party	Candidate	Votes	%	±%
Labor	Thomas Heron	unopposed		
Labor hold		Swing		

=== Mount Magnet ===
1927 Western Australian state election: Mount Magnet
Party	Candidate	Votes	%	±%
Labor	Michael Troy	unopposed		
Labor hold		Swing		

=== Mount Margaret ===
1927 Western Australian state election: Mount Margaret
Party	Candidate	Votes	%	±%
Nationalist	George Taylor	212	55.1	+0.2
Labor	Martin Hartigan	173	44.9	−0.2
Total formal votes		385	98.5	−1.2
Informal votes		6	1.5	+1.2
Turnout		391	80.1	+5.1
Nationalist hold		Swing	+0.2	

=== Murchison ===
1927 Western Australian state election: Murchison
Party	Candidate	Votes	%	±%
Labor	William Marshall	unopposed		
Labor hold		Swing		

=== Murray-Wellington ===
1927 Western Australian state election: Murray-Wellington
Party	Candidate	Votes	%	±%
Labor	Thomas Butler	1,540	42.2	−2.1
Nationalist	William George	1,250	34.3	−11.5
Country	Francis Becher	856	23.5	+13.7
Total formal votes		3,646	98.2	+0.2
Informal votes		68	1.8	−0.2
Turnout		3,714	72.5	+8.8
Two-party-preferred result
Nationalist	William George	1,899	52.1	+1.1
Labor	Thomas Butler	1,747	47.9	−1.1
Nationalist hold		Swing	+1.1	

=== Nelson ===
1927 Western Australian state election: Nelson
Party	Candidate	Votes	%	±%
Nationalist	John Smith	2,055	50.2	−1.4
Labor	Dennis Jones	1,211	29.6	−8.9
Country	William Huggett	829	20.2	+20.2
Total formal votes		4,095	98.2	−0.4
Informal votes		75	1.8	+0.4
Turnout		4,170	74.0	+14.5
Nationalist hold		Swing	N/A	

- Preferences were not distributed.

=== North Perth ===
1927 Western Australian state election: North Perth
Party	Candidate	Votes	%	±%
Nationalist	James Smith	3,321	52.7	+5.7
Labor	Frank Darcey	2,985	47.3	+6.9
Total formal votes		6,306	98.9	+0.1
Informal votes		69	1.1	−0.1
Turnout		6,375	76.9	+20.4
Nationalist hold		Swing	−0.9	

=== North-East Fremantle ===
1927 Western Australian state election: North-East Fremantle
Party	Candidate	Votes	%	±%
Labor	Francis Rowe	4,009	72.5	−27.5
Nationalist	Oliver Strang	1,518	27.5	+27.5
Total formal votes		5,527	98.3	
Informal votes		93	1.7	
Turnout		5,620	75.0	
Labor hold		Swing	N/A	

=== Northam ===
1927 Western Australian state election: Northam
Party	Candidate	Votes	%	±%
Nationalist	James Mitchell	1,546	53.6	+0.6
Labor	Bill Hegney	1,337	46.4	−0.6
Total formal votes		2,883	99.2	0.0
Informal votes		23	0.8	0.0
Turnout		2,906	84.5	+9.0
Nationalist hold		Swing	+0.6	

=== Perth ===
1927 Western Australian state election: Perth
Party	Candidate	Votes	%	±%
Nationalist	Harry Mann	1,656	50.0	−2.0
Labor	Cyril Longmore	1,368	41.3	−6.7
Nationalist	William Murray	285	8.6	+8.6
Total formal votes		3,309	96.6	−2.4
Informal votes		115	3.4	+2.4
Turnout		3,424	71.9	+23.7
Nationalist hold		Swing	N/A	

- Preferences were not distributed.

=== Pilbara ===
1927 Western Australian state election: Pilbara
Party	Candidate	Votes	%	±%
Labor	Alfred Lamond	223	55.2	+9.5
Nationalist	Henry Underwood	149	36.9	−1.7
Independent Labor	Edward Snell	32	7.9	+7.9
Total formal votes		404	98.3	+3.2
Informal votes		7	1.7	−3.2
Turnout		411	78.6	+22.3
Labor hold		Swing	N/A	

- Preferences were not distributed.

=== Pingelly ===
1927 Western Australian state election: Pingelly
Party	Candidate	Votes	%	±%
Country	Henry Brown	1,084	61.4	+44.9
Country	Joseph Watson	402	22.8	+6.5
Nationalist	Joseph Keays	279	15.8	−13.2
Total formal votes		1,765	98.3	+0.6
Informal votes		31	1.7	−0.6
Turnout		1,796	64.4	+7.6
Country hold		Swing	N/A	

- Preferences were not distributed.

=== Roebourne ===
1927 Western Australian state election: Roebourne
Party	Candidate	Votes	%	±%
Nationalist	Frederick Teesdale	252	57.8	−42.2
Labor	Thomas McCarthy	184	42.2	+42.2
Total formal votes		436	99.8	
Informal votes		1	0.2	
Turnout		437	66.2	
Nationalist hold		Swing	N/A	

=== South Fremantle ===
1927 Western Australian state election: South Fremantle
Party	Candidate	Votes	%	±%
Labor	Alick McCallum	3,028	78.9	−21.1
Nationalist	Philip Jane	812	21.1	+21.1
Total formal votes		3,840	98.9	
Informal votes		42	1.1	
Turnout		3,882	76.9	
Labor hold		Swing	N/A	

=== Subiaco ===
1927 Western Australian state election: Subiaco
Party	Candidate	Votes	%	±%
Nationalist	Walter Richardson	4,489	55.1	+11.6
Labor	John Leonard	3,653	44.9	+11.9
Total formal votes		8,142	99.0	+0.3
Informal votes		83	1.0	−0.3
Turnout		8,225	77.5	+13.7
Nationalist hold		Swing	−8.3	

=== Sussex ===
1927 Western Australian state election: Sussex
Party	Candidate	Votes	%	±%
Nationalist	George Barnard	1,469	42.2	+0.5
Labor	John Tonkin	1,226	35.3	+5.6
Country	William Pickering	782	22.5	−6.1
Total formal votes		3,477	98.3	−0.3
Informal votes		59	1.7	+0.3
Turnout		3,536	77.3	+7.6
Two-party-preferred result
Nationalist	George Barnard	2,052	59.0	+1.1
Labor	John Tonkin	1,425	41.0	−1.1
Nationalist hold		Swing	+1.1	

=== Swan ===
1927 Western Australian state election: Swan
Party	Candidate	Votes	%	±%
Nationalist	Richard Sampson	2,395	61.6	+3.7
Labor	Charles Huntley	1,495	38.4	−3.7
Total formal votes		3,890	99.1	−0.1
Informal votes		35	0.9	+0.1
Turnout		3,925	71.7	+2.2
Nationalist hold		Swing	+3.7	

=== Toodyay ===
1927 Western Australian state election: Toodyay
Party	Candidate	Votes	%	±%
Country	John Lindsay	1,762	61.1	+35.7
Country	Ignatius Boyle	1,122	38.9	+21.2
Total formal votes		2,884	99.3	+1.5
Informal votes		20	0.7	−1.5
Turnout		2,904	60.7	+4.3
Country hold		Swing	N/A	

=== Wagin ===
1927 Western Australian state election: Wagin
Party	Candidate	Votes	%	±%
Nationalist	Sydney Stubbs	1,432	59.2	−4.9
Country	Adam Elder	689	28.5	−7.4
Country	Phillip Toll	296	12.3	+12.3
Total formal votes		2,417	98.7	−0.5
Informal votes		31	1.3	+0.5
Turnout		2,448	75.8	+14.5
Nationalist hold		Swing	N/A	

=== West Perth ===
1927 Western Australian state election: West Perth
Party	Candidate	Votes	%	±%
Nationalist	Thomas Davy	1,766	44.4	+9.6
Labor	Alexander McDougall	1,405	35.4	+1.1
Women's Electoral League	Edith Cowan	803	20.2	+20.2
Total formal votes		3,974	97.5	−1.7
Informal votes		101	2.5	+1.7
Turnout		4,075	76.2	+11.4
Two-party-preferred result
Nationalist	Thomas Davy	2,400	60.4	−0.4
Labor	Alexander McDougall	1,574	39.6	+0.4
Nationalist hold		Swing	−0.4	

=== Williams-Narrogin ===
1927 Western Australian state election: Williams-Narrogin
Party	Candidate	Votes	%	±%
Country	Edward Johnston	2,565	75.6	+3.2
Labor	John Clunas	826	24.4	−3.2
Total formal votes		3,368	99.3	−0.3
Informal votes		23	0.7	+0.3
Turnout		3,414	70.9	+7.9
Country hold		Swing	+3.2	

=== Yilgarn ===
1927 Western Australian state election: Yilgarn
Party	Candidate	Votes	%	±%
Labor	Edwin Corboy	607	54.5	−3.9
Country	John Blake	394	35.4	+19.3
Country	Arthur Brown	112	10.1	+10.1
Total formal votes		1,113	98.4	−1.2
Informal votes		18	1.6	+1.2
Turnout		1,131	81.4	+5.1
Labor hold		Swing	N/A	

- Preferences were not distributed.

=== York ===
1927 Western Australian state election: York
Party	Candidate	Votes	%	±%
Nationalist	Charles Latham	1,736	55.1	−5.6
Labor	Walter Butler	827	26.3	+26.3
Country	Peter Ledsham	586	18.6	−20.7
Total formal votes		3,149	98.1	−1.3
Informal votes		62	1.9	+1.3
Turnout		3,211	72.7	+8.6
Nationalist hold		Swing	N/A	

- Preferences were not distributed.

== See also ==
- 1927 Western Australian state election
- Candidates of the 1927 Western Australian state election
- Members of the Western Australian Legislative Assembly, 1927–1930
