= Candidates of the 1927 Western Australian state election =

The 1927 Western Australian state election was held on 26 March 1927.

== Retiring Members ==
=== Labor ===
- William Angwin (MLA) North-East Fremantle

=== Independent ===
- Thomas Hughes (MLA) East Perth

== Legislative Assembly ==
Sitting members are shown in bold text. Successful candidates are highlighted in the relevant colour. Where there is possible confusion, an asterisk (*) is also used.

Electorate	Held by	Labor candidate	Nationalist candidate	Country candidate	Other candidates
Albany	Labor	**Arthur Wansbrough**		Archibald Booth	
Avon	Country	Patrick Coffey		**Harry Griffiths**	
Beverley	Country		James Mann	**Charles Wansbrough**	
Boulder	Labor	**Philip Collier**			
Brown Hill-Ivanhoe	Labor	**John Lutey**			
Bunbury	Labor	**Frederick Withers**	Les Craig; George Clarke		
Canning	Labor	**Alec Clydesdale**	Herbert Wells		
Claremont	Nationalist	Theodore Morgan	**Charles North**		
Collie	Labor	**Arthur Wilson**			
Coolgardie	Labor	**George Lambert**	William Vale		
Cue	Labor	**Thomas Chesson**			
East Perth	Independent	James Kenneally	Charles Bull; Thomas Ferguson; Gerald Hartrey		
Forrest	Labor	**May Holman**			
Fremantle	Labor	**Joseph Sleeman**	Richard Rennie; Donald Sinclair		
Gascoyne	Nationalist	William Willesee	**Edward Angelo**		
Geraldton	Labor	**John Willcock**		Charles Counsel	
Greenough	Labor	**Maurice Kennedy**	Henry Maley	Charles Smith	
Guildford	Labor	**William Johnson**	Hubert Parker		
Hannans	Labor	**Selby Munsie**			Branwell Saunders (Ind. Nationalist)
Irwin	Nationalist		**Charles Maley**	John Stratton	
Kalgoorlie	Labor	**James Cunningham**	George Rainsford		James Cummins (Independent)
Kanowna	Labor	**Thomas Walker**			
Katanning	Country	David Parker		**Alec Thomson**	
Kimberley	Labor	**Aubrey Coverley**			Arthur Male (Ind. Nationalist); Patrick Percy (Ind. Nationalist)
Leederville	Labor	**Harry Millington**	John Scaddan		Christina Blake (Ind. Nationalist)
Menzies	Labor	**Alexander Panton**	Dick Ardagh; Albert Faul		
Moore	Nationalist		**James Denton**	Percy Ferguson	
Mount Leonora	Labor	**Thomas Heron**			
Mount Magnet	Labor	**Michael Troy**			
Mount Margaret	Nationalist	Martin Hartigan	**George Taylor**		
Murchison	Labor	**William Marshall**			
Murray-Wellington	Nationalist	Thomas Butler	**William George**	Francis Becher	
Nelson	Nationalist	Dennis Jones	**John Smith**	William Huggett	
North Perth	Nationalist	Frank Darcey	**James Smith**		
North-East Fremantle	Labor	Francis Rowe	Oliver Strang		
Northam	Nationalist	Bill Hegney	**James Mitchell**		
Perth	Nationalist	Cyril Longmore	**Harry Mann***; William Murray		
Pilbara	Labor	**Alfred Lamond**	Henry Underwood		Edward Snell (Ind. Labor)
Pingelly	Country		Joseph Keays	**Henry Brown***; Joseph Watson	
Roebourne	Nationalist	Thomas McCarthy	**Frederick Teesdale**		
South Fremantle	Labor	**Alick McCallum**	Philip Jane		
Subiaco	Nationalist	John Leonard	**Walter Richardson**		
Sussex	Nationalist	John Tonkin	**George Barnard**	William Pickering	
Swan	Nationalist	Charles Huntley	**Richard Sampson**		
Toodyay	Country			**John Lindsay***; Ignatius Boyle	
Wagin	Nationalist		**Sydney Stubbs**	Adam Elder; Phillip Toll	
West Perth	Nationalist	Alexander McDougall	**Thomas Davy**		Edith Cowan (Women's Electoral League)
Williams-Narrogin	Country	John Clunas		**Edward Johnston**	
Yilgarn	Labor	**Edwin Corboy**		John Blake; Arthur Brown	
York	Nationalist	Walter Butler	**Charles Latham**	Peter Ledsham	

== See also ==
- Members of the Western Australian Legislative Assembly, 1924–1927
- Members of the Western Australian Legislative Assembly, 1927–1930
- 1927 Western Australian state election
