= Members of the Western Australian Legislative Assembly, 1927–1930 =

This is a list of members of the Western Australian Legislative Assembly between the 1927 election and the 1930 election, together known as the 13th Parliament.

Name	Party	District	Years in office
Edward Angelo	Nationalist	Gascoyne	1917–1933
George Barnard	Nationalist	Sussex	1924–1933
Henry Brown	Country	Pingelly	1924–1933
Thomas Chesson	Labor	Cue	1913–1930
Alexander Clydesdale	Labor	Canning	1921–1930
Philip Collier	Labor	Boulder	1905–1948
Edwin Corboy	Labor	Yilgarn	1921–1933
Aubrey Coverley	Labor	Kimberley	1924–1953
Peter Ernest Cowan^{[4]}	Labor	Mount Leonora	1928–1930
James Cunningham	Labor	Kalgoorlie	1923–1936
Thomas Davy	Nationalist	West Perth	1924–1933
Victor Doney^{[3]}	Country	Williams-Narrogin	1928–1956
Percy Ferguson	Country	Moore	1927–1939
William James George	Nationalist	Murray-Wellington	1895–1902; 1909–1930
Harry Griffiths	Country	Avon	1914–1921; 1924–1935
Thomas Heron^{[4]}	Labor	Mount Leonora	1920–1928
May Holman	Labor	Forrest	1925–1939
William Johnson	Labor	Guildford	1901–1905; 1906–1917; 1924–1948
Edward Johnston^{[3]}	Country	Williams-Narrogin	1911–1928
James Kenneally	Labor	East Perth	1927–1936
Maurice Kennedy	Labor	Greenough	1924–1930
George Lambert	Labor	Coolgardie	1916–1930; 1933–1941
Alfred Lamond	Labor	Pilbara	1924–1933
Charles Latham	Nationalist/Country	York	1921–1942
John Lindsay	Country	Toodyay	1924–1933
John Lutey	Labor	Brownhill-Ivanhoe	1916; 1917–1932
Alick McCallum	Labor	South Fremantle	1921–1935
Charles Maley^{[5]}	Nationalist/Country	Irwin	1921–1929
Henry Maley^{[5]}	Country	Irwin	1917–1924; 1929–1930
Harry Mann	Nationalist	Perth	1921–1933
William Marshall	Labor	Murchison	1921–1952
Harry Millington	Labor	Leederville	1924–1947
Hon Sir James Mitchell	Nationalist	Northam	1905–1933
Selby Munsie	Labor	Hannans	1911–1938
Charles North	Nationalist	Claremont	1924–1956
Alexander Panton	Labor	Menzies	1924–1951
Walter Richardson	Nationalist	Subiaco	1921–1933
Francis Rowe	Labor	North-East Fremantle	1927–1930
Richard Sampson	Nationalist	Swan	1921–1944
Joseph Sleeman	Labor	Fremantle	1924–1959
James MacCallum Smith	Nationalist	North Perth	1914–1939
John Henry Smith	Nationalist	Nelson	1921–1936; 1939–1943
Sydney Stubbs	Nationalist/Country	Wagin	1911–1947
George Taylor	Nationalist	Mount Margaret	1901–1930
Frederick Teesdale	Nationalist	Roebourne	1917–1931
Alec Thomson	Country	Katanning	1914–1930
Michael Troy	Labor	Mount Magnet	1904–1939
Thomas Walker	Labor	Kanowna	1905–1932
Arthur Wansbrough	Labor	Albany	1924–1936
Charles Wansbrough	Country	Beverley	1914–1917; 1924–1930
John Willcock	Labor	Geraldton	1917–1947
Arthur Wilson	Labor	Collie	1908–1947
Frederick Withers	Labor	Bunbury	1924–1947

== Notes ==
^{1} Selby Munsie was appointed Minister for Mines and Health on 30 April 1927, and was therefore required to resign and contest a ministerial by-election on 9 May 1927, at which he was returned unopposed.
^{2} Harry Millington and James Cunningham were appointed Minister for Agriculture and Minister for Goldfields Water Supplies respectively on 15 December 1927, and were therefore required to resign and contest ministerial by-elections on 23 December 1927, at which both were returned unopposed.
^{3} On 3 October 1928, the Country member for Williams-Narrogin, Edward Johnston, resigned to contest a Senate seat at the upcoming federal election. Country candidate Victor Doney won the resulting by-election on 3 November 1928.
^{4} On 13 October 1928, the Labor member for Mount Leonora, Thomas Heron, died. Labor candidate Peter Ernest Cowan was elected unopposed on 7 November 1928.
^{5} On 15 October 1929, the Country member for Irwin, Charles Maley, died. His brother, Country candidate Henry Maley, won the resulting by-election on 19 November 1929.

== Sources ==
- Black, David; Prescott, Valerie (1997). Election statistics, Legislative Assembly of Western Australia, 1890-1996. Perth: Parliamentary History Project. ISBN 0-7309-8409-5.
- Hughes, Colin A.; Graham, B. D. (1976). Voting for the South Australian, Western Australian and Tasmanian Lower Houses, 1890-1964. Canberra: Australian National University. ISBN 0-7081-1334-6.
