= Electoral results for the district of Mount Leonora =

Western Australian district election results

This is a list of electoral results for the Electoral district of Mount Leonora in Western Australian state elections.

== Members for Mount Leonora ==
Members	Party	Term
Patrick Lynch	Labor	1904–1906
Julian Stuart	Labor	1906–1908
Hugh Gourley	Labor	1908–1911
George Foley	Labor	1911–1917
George Foley	National Labor	1917–1920
Thomas Heron	Labor	1920–1928
Ernest Cowan	Labor	1928–1930

== Election results ==
=== Elections in the 1920s ===
1928 Mount Leonora state by-election
Party	Candidate	Votes	%	±%
Labor	Ernest Cowan	unopposed		
Labor hold		Swing		

1927 Western Australian state election: Mount Leonora
Party	Candidate	Votes	%	±%
Labor	Thomas Heron	unopposed		
Labor hold		Swing		

1924 Western Australian state election: Mount Leonora
Party	Candidate	Votes	%	±%
Labor	Thomas Heron	408	73.3	+15.4
Independent	George Wilson	149	26.7	+26.7
Total formal votes		557	97.7	−1.7
Informal votes		13	2.3	+1.7
Turnout		570	73.0	−6.2
Labor hold		Swing	N/A	

1921 Western Australian state election: Mount Leonora
Party	Candidate	Votes	%	±%
Labor	Thomas Heron	465	57.9	+19.4
National Labor	Sydney Fowler	338	42.1	−19.4
Total formal votes		803	99.4	−0.3
Informal votes		5	0.6	+0.3
Turnout		808	79.2	−4.7
Labor gain from National Labor		Swing	+19.4	

1920 Mount Leonora state by-election
Party	Candidate	Votes	%	±%
Labor	Thomas Heron	399	56.6	+18.1
National Labor	Sydney Fowler	306	43.4	−18.1
Total formal votes		705	N/A	N/A
Informal votes		N/A	N/A	N/A
Turnout		N/A	N/A	N/A
Labor gain from National Labor		Swing	+18.1	

=== Elections in the 1910s ===
1917 Western Australian state election: Mount Leonora
Party	Candidate	Votes	%	±%
National Labor	George Foley	598	61.5	–38.5
Labor	Frederick Madden	375	38.5	+38.5
Total formal votes		973	99.7	n/a
Informal votes		3	0.3	n/a
Turnout		976	83.9	n/a
National Labor hold		Swing	N/A	

- Foley had run for Labor at the 1914 election, and was elected unopposed.

1914 Western Australian state election: Mount Leonora
Party	Candidate	Votes	%	±%
Labor	George Foley	unopposed		
Labor hold		Swing		

1911 Western Australian state election: Mount Leonora
Party	Candidate	Votes	%	±%
Labor	George Foley	1,019	87.0	
Ministerialist	Arthur Court	153	13.0	
Total formal votes		1,172	99.3	
Informal votes		8	0.7	
Turnout		1,180	48.2	
Labor hold		Swing		

=== Elections in the 1900s ===
1908 Western Australian state election: Mount Leonora
Party	Candidate	Votes	%	±%
Labour	Hugh Gourley	767	42.0	−25.5
Ministerialist	Joseph Semken	639	35.0	+2.5
Labour	John Carr	422	23.1	+23.1
Total formal votes		1,828	98.9	+0.4
Informal votes		21	1.1	−0.4
Turnout		1,849	53.0	+25.1
Two-party-preferred result
Labour	Hugh Gourley	1,079	62.0	−5.5
Ministerialist	Joseph Semken	662	38.0	+5.5
Labour hold		Swing	−5.5	

1906 Mount Leonora state by-election
Party	Candidate	Votes	%	±%
Labour	Hugh Gourley	unopposed		
Labour hold		Swing		

1905 Western Australian state election: Mount Leonora
Party	Candidate	Votes	%	±%
Labour	Patrick Lynch	786	67.5	+0.9
Ministerialist	Joseph Semken	378	32.5	–0.9
Total formal votes		1,204	98.5	n/a
Informal votes		18	1.5	n/a
Turnout		1,222	67.1	n/a
Labour hold		Swing	+0.9	

1904 Western Australian state election: Mount Leonora
Party	Candidate	Votes	%	±%
Labour	Patrick Lynch	unopposed		
Labour win		(new seat)		
