= Electoral results for the district of Brown Hill-Ivanhoe =

Western Australian district election results

This is a list of electoral results for the Electoral district of Brown Hill-Ivanhoe in Western Australian state elections.

== Members for Brown Hill-Ivanhoe ==
Member	Party	Start	End
John Scaddan	Labor	3 October 1911	8 August 1916
John Lutey	Labor	19 August 1916	15 September 1916
John Scaddan	Labor	7 October 1916	7 April 1917
John Scaddan	National Labor	7 April 1917	28 June 1917
John Lutey	Labor	21 July 1917	22 June 1932
Frederick Smith	Labor	14 July 1932	25 March 1950

== Election results ==
=== Elections in the 1940s ===
1947 Western Australian state election: Brown Hill-Ivanhoe
Party	Candidate	Votes	%	±%
Labor	Frederick Smith	unopposed		
Labor hold		Swing		

1943 Western Australian state election: Brown Hill-Ivanhoe
Party	Candidate	Votes	%	±%
Labor	Frederick Smith	unopposed		
Labor hold		Swing		

=== Elections in the 1930s ===
1939 Western Australian state election: Brown Hill-Ivanhoe
Party	Candidate	Votes	%	±%
Labor	Frederick Smith	2,156	71.3	−28.7
Nationalist	Wesley Moore	868	28.7	+28.7
Total formal votes		3,024	98.7	
Informal votes		41	1.3	
Turnout		3,065	92.4	
Labor hold		Swing	N/A	

1936 Western Australian state election: Brown Hill-Ivanhoe
Party	Candidate	Votes	%	±%
Labor	Frederick Smith	unopposed		
Labor hold		Swing		

1933 Western Australian state election: Brown Hill-Ivanhoe
Party	Candidate	Votes	%	±%
Labor	Frederick Smith	unopposed		
Labor hold		Swing		

1932 Brownhill-Ivanhoe state by-election
Party	Candidate	Votes	%	±%
Labor	Frederick Smith	unopposed		
Labor hold		Swing		

1930 Western Australian state election: Brownhill-Ivanhoe
Party	Candidate	Votes	%	±%
Labor	John Lutey	unopposed		
Labor hold		Swing		

=== Elections in the 1920s ===
1927 Western Australian state election: Brownhill-Ivanhoe
Party	Candidate	Votes	%	±%
Labor	John Lutey	unopposed		
Labor hold		Swing		

1924 Western Australian state election: Brownhill-Ivanhoe
Party	Candidate	Votes	%	±%
Labor	John Lutey	1,318	74.6	+17.9
National Labor	George Holmes	259	14.7	−28.6
Ind. Nationalist	Elliot Brown	190	10.8	+10.8
Total formal votes		1,767	98.4	−0.9
Informal votes		29	1.6	+0.9
Turnout		1,796	66.8	−9.6
Labor hold		Swing	N/A	

1921 Western Australian state election: Brownhill-Ivanhoe
Party	Candidate	Votes	%	±%
Labor	John Lutey	1,490	56.7	+4.1
National Labor	James Reed	1,140	43.3	−4.1
Total formal votes		2,630	99.3	−0.3
Informal votes		19	0.7	+0.3
Turnout		2,649	76.4	+1.7
Labor hold		Swing	+4.1	

=== Elections in the 1910s ===
1917 Western Australian state election: Brownhill-Ivanhoe
Party	Candidate	Votes	%	±%
Labor	John Lutey	1,788	52.6	–0.5
National Labor	John Boyland	1,613	47.4	+0.5
Total formal votes		3,401	99.6	–0.3
Informal votes		12	0.4	+0.3
Turnout		3,413	74.7	+2.7
Labor hold		Swing	–0.5	

1917 Brownhill-Ivanhoe state by-election
Party	Candidate	Votes	%	±%
Labor	John Lutey	1,524	53.1	N/A
National Labor	John Scaddan	1,347	46.9	+46.9
Total formal votes		2,871	99.9	
Informal votes		4	0.1	
Turnout		2,875	72.0	
Labor hold		Swing	N/A	

October 1916 Brownhill-Ivanhoe state by-election
Party	Candidate	Votes	%	±%
Labor	John Scaddan	1,572	72.7	N/A
Anti-Conscription	Edward Dunn	489	22.6	+22.6
All British Association	George Toll	102	4.7	+4.7
Total formal votes		2,163	96.9	
Informal votes		68	3.1	
Turnout		2,231	55.8	
Labor hold		Swing	N/A	

August 1916 Brownhill-Ivanhoe state by-election
Party	Candidate	Votes	%	±%
Labor	John Lutey	unopposed		
Labor hold		Swing		

1914 Western Australian state election: Brownhill-Ivanhoe
Party	Candidate	Votes	%	±%
Labor	John Scaddan	unopposed		
Labor hold		Swing		

1911 Western Australian state election: Brownhill-Ivanhoe
Party	Candidate	Votes	%	±%
Labor	John Scaddan	unopposed		
Labor hold		Swing		
