= Electoral results for the district of Williams (Western Australia) =

Western Australian district election results

This is a list of electoral results for the Electoral district of Williams in Western Australian state elections.

== Members for Williams ==
Williams (1890–1911)
Member	Party	Term
Frederick Henry Piesse	Ministerial	1890–1904
Frank Cowcher	Ministerial	1904–1911
Williams-Narrogin (1911–1950)
Member	Party	Term
Bertie Johnston	Labor	1911–1915
Bertie Johnston	Independent	1916–1917
Bertie Johnston	Country	1917–1923
Bertie Johnston	Country (ECP)	1923–1924
Bertie Johnston	Country	1924–1928
Victor Doney	Country	1928–1950

== Election results ==
=== Elections in the 1940s ===
1947 Western Australian state election: Williams-Narrogin
Party	Candidate	Votes	%	±%
Country	Victor Doney	1,939	70.5	+3.9
Labor	Moses Mowday	813	29.5	−3.9
Total formal votes		2,752	99.2	+0.6
Informal votes		21	0.8	−0.6
Turnout		2,773	84.5	−0.3
Country hold		Swing	+3.9	

1943 Western Australian state election: Williams-Narrogin
Party	Candidate	Votes	%	±%
Country	Victor Doney	1,749	66.6	−3.6
Labor	Edward Dolan	877	33.4	+3.6
Total formal votes		2,626	98.6	−0.5
Informal votes		37	1.4	+0.5
Turnout		2,663	84.8	−4.7
Country hold		Swing	−3.6	

=== Elections in the 1930s ===
1939 Western Australian state election: Williams-Narrogin
Party	Candidate	Votes	%	±%
Country	Victor Doney	2,009	70.2	−29.8
Labor	Harry Hyde	854	29.8	+29.8
Total formal votes		2,863	99.1	
Informal votes		25	0.9	
Turnout		2,888	89.5	
Country hold		Swing	N/A	

1936 Western Australian state election: Williams-Narrogin
Party	Candidate	Votes	%	±%
Country	Victor Doney	unopposed		
Country hold		Swing		

1933 Western Australian state election: Williams-Narrogin
Party	Candidate	Votes	%	±%
Country	Victor Doney	1,968	67.7	−2.7
Independent	Arthur McCormick	941	32.3	+2.3
Total formal votes		2,909	98.5	−1.0
Informal votes		45	1.5	+1.0
Turnout		2,954	89.0	+7.8
Country hold		Swing	N/A	

1930 Western Australian state election: Williams-Narrogin
Party	Candidate	Votes	%	±%
Country	Victor Doney	1,966	70.4	
Labor	John McKenna	825	29.6	
Total formal votes		2,791	99.5	
Informal votes		14	0.5	
Turnout		2,805	81.2	
Country hold		Swing		

=== Elections in the 1920s ===
1928 Williams-Narrogin state by-election
Party	Candidate	Votes	%	±%
Country	Victor Doney	1,284	42.5	−33.1
Country	Andrew Watson	882	29.2	+29.2
Independent	Edward Illingworth	488	16.1	+16.1
Country	Thomas Kiely	370	12.2	+12.2
Total formal votes		3,024	98.3	−1.0
Informal votes		52	1.7	+1.0
Turnout		3,076	65.4	−5.5
Two-candidate-preferred result
Country	Victor Doney	1,774	58.7	−16.9
Country	Andrew Watson	1,250	41.3	+41.3
Country hold		Swing	N/A	

1927 Western Australian state election: Williams-Narrogin
Party	Candidate	Votes	%	±%
Country	Edward Johnston	2,565	75.6	+3.2
Labor	John Clunas	826	24.4	−3.2
Total formal votes		3,368	99.3	−0.3
Informal votes		23	0.7	+0.3
Turnout		3,414	70.9	+7.9
Country hold		Swing	+3.2	

1924 Western Australian state election: Williams-Narrogin
Party	Candidate	Votes	%	±%
Executive Country	Edward Johnston	1,881	72.4	
Labor	Cyril Longmore	717	27.6	
Total formal votes		2,598	99.6	
Informal votes		9	0.4	
Turnout		2,607	63.0	
Executive Country gain from Country		Swing	N/A	

1921 Western Australian state election: Williams-Narrogin
Party	Candidate	Votes	%	±%
Country	Edward Johnston	unopposed		
Country hold		Swing		

=== Elections in the 1910s ===
1917 Western Australian state election: Williams-Narrogin
Party	Candidate	Votes	%	±%
National Country	Bertie Johnston	1,703	79.0	–21.0
National Country	William Rabbish	454	21.0	+21.0
Total formal votes		2,157	99.4	n/a
Informal votes		14	0.6	n/a
Turnout		2,171	61.1	n/a
National Country hold		Swing	–21.0	

1916 Williams-Narrogin state by-election
Party	Candidate	Votes	%	±%
Independent	Bertie Johnston	unopposed		
Member changed to Independent from Labor				

1914 Western Australian state election: Williams-Narrogin
Party	Candidate	Votes	%	±%
Labor	Bertie Johnston	1,947	65.2	+11.0
Country	Solomon Fisher	1,038	34.8	+34.8
Total formal votes		2,985	99.4	+0.9
Informal votes		19	0.6	−0.9
Turnout		3,004	62.1	−15.7
Labor hold		Swing	N/A	

1911 Western Australian state election: Williams-Narrogin
Party	Candidate	Votes	%	±%
Labor	Bertie Johnston	1,229	54.2	
Ministerialist	Frank Cowcher	1,018	44.9	
Independent	James Sale	20	0.9	
Total formal votes		2,267	98.5	
Informal votes		34	1.5	
Turnout		2,301	77.8	
Labor gain from Ministerialist		Swing		

- Preferences were not distributed.

=== Elections in the 1900s ===
1908 Western Australian state election: Williams
Party	Candidate	Votes	%	±%
Ministerialist	Frank Cowcher	1,323	61.8	−19.4
Labour	Edward Hamersley	337	15.7	+15.7
Ministerialist	William Moss	299	14.0	+14.0
Ministerialist	William Rabbish	182	8.5	+8.5
Total formal votes		2,141	98.5	−0.1
Informal votes		32	1.5	+0.1
Turnout		2,173	51.1	+8.5
Ministerialist hold		Swing	N/A	

1905 Western Australian state election: Williams
Party	Candidate	Votes	%	±%
Ministerialist	Frank Cowcher	703	81.2	+36.2
Labour	Peter Wedd	163	18.8	–5.4
Total formal votes		866	98.6	+0.1
Informal votes		12	1.4	–0.1
Turnout		878	42.6	–12.0
Ministerialist hold		Swing	+36.2	

1904 Western Australian state election: Williams
Party	Candidate	Votes	%	±%
Independent	Frank Cowcher	531	45.0	+45.0
Labour	Peter Wedd	274	23.2	+23.2
Independent	Richard Gell	198	16.8	+16.8
Ministerialist	Julius Nenke	176	14.9	+14.9
Total formal votes		1,179	98.5	n/a
Informal votes		18	1.5	n/a
Turnout		1,197	54.6	n/a
Independent gain from Ministerialist		Swing	+45.0	

1901 Western Australian state election: Williams
Party	Candidate	Votes	%	±%
Ministerialist	Frederick Henry Piesse	unopposed		
Ministerialist hold		Swing		

=== Elections in the 1890s ===
1897 Western Australian colonial election: Williams
Party	Candidate	Votes	%	±%
Ministerialist	Frederick Piesse	unopposed		
Ministerialist hold		Swing		

1894 Western Australian colonial election: Williams
Party	Candidate	Votes	%	±%
None	Frederick Piesse	196	82.0	–18.0
None	Wesley Maley	43	18.0	+18.0

1890 Western Australian colonial election: Williams
Party	Candidate	Votes	%	±%
None	Frederick Piesse	unopposed		
