= Electoral results for the district of Ivanhoe (Western Australia) =

Western Australian district election results

This is a list of electoral results for the Electoral district of Ivanhoe in Western Australian state elections.

== Members for Ivanhoe ==
Member	Party	Term
John Scaddan	Labor	1904–1911

== Election results ==
=== Elections in the 1900s ===
1908 Western Australian state election: Ivanhoe
Party	Candidate	Votes	%	±%
Labour	John Scaddan	unopposed		
Labour hold		Swing		

1905 Western Australian state election: Ivanhoe
Party	Candidate	Votes	%	±%
Labour	John Scaddan	unopposed		
Labour hold		Swing		

1904 Western Australian state election: Ivanhoe
Party	Candidate	Votes	%	±%
Labour	John Scaddan	1,335	60.0	+60.0
Independent Labour	James Cummins	888	40.0	+40.0
Total formal votes		2,223	99.7	n/a
Informal votes		7	0.3	n/a
Turnout		2,230	58.2	n/a
Labour win		(new seat)		
