= George Rainsford =

George Rainsford may refer to:

- George Rainsford (politician), Australian politician
- George Rainsford (actor) (born 1982), British actor
