= Hugh Gourley (Australian politician) =

Australian politician

Member of the Legislative Assembly of Western Australia
- In office 11 September 1908 – 3 October 1911
- Preceded by: Julian Stuart
- Succeeded by: George Foley
- Constituency: Mount Leonora

Personal details
- Born: 30 July 1875 Victoria, Australia
- Died: unknown
- Party: Labor

Hugh Alexander Gourley (30 July 1875 – ?) was an Australian trade unionist and politician who was a Labor Party member of the Legislative Assembly of Western Australia from 1908 to 1911, representing the seat of Mount Leonora.

Gourley was born in Victoria, the son of Annie Jane (née Coote) and Gilbert Gourley. He came to Western Australia in 1898, during the gold rush, and settled in Menzies, where he worked for periods as a gold miner, greengrocer, and fuel merchant. Gourley was a secretary of the Menzies Miners' Union and served two terms on the Menzies Municipal Council, as well as sitting on the North Coolgardie Road Board. He entered parliament at the 1908 state election, winning Labor preselection only after the sitting member, Julian Stuart, failed to lodge his deposit in time. Prior to the 1911 election, Gourley was defeated for preselection by George Foley. He placed only sixth on the preselection ballot. After leaving parliament, Gourley worked as a land agent in Perth for a few years. Nothing definite is known of his life after 1913, although someone with the same name stood for office in Townsville in 1927, indicating he may have moved to Queensland.

Parliament of Western Australia
Preceded by Julian Stuart	Member for Mount Leonora; 1908–1911	Succeeded by George Foley
