= Lyndall Hadow =

Western Australian short story writer and journalist

Lyndall Hadow (1903–1976) was a Western Australian short story writer and journalist. The Lyndall Hadow Annual Award for Short Stories was created by the Fellowship of Australian Writers Western Australia (FAWWA) in 1977 to honour her.

== Life ==
Hadow was born in 1903 on the goldfields of Kalgoorlie, Western Australia. Her parents were strongly socialist. Her mother Florence Collings organised the first Women's Labor League on the goldfields. Her father Julian Stuart was active in trade unions and the editor of the Westralian Worker. Her younger brother was the novelist Donald Stuart.

She attended the Perth Modern School but left before she completed.

Hadow lived and travelled in outback Australia, including working as a travelling salesman and as the matron of a government native settlement.

Hadow and her husband were living in Darwin at the time of the bombing in 1942. She had refused to leave when the women were evacuated. She documented the event in photos and a documentary, The final evacuation of women from Darwin. She was well known for her early reporting of the bombing.

== Writing career ==
Many of Hadow's early stories were published in Labor Digest in the 1940s. Her stories appeared in the Bulletin, Coast to Coast, Westerly and several collections of Australian short stories. A collection of Hadow's stories, Full Cycle and Other Stories, was published in 1969.

Her stories deal with migrant assimilation, Aboriginal issues and the dependence of women on men. Political activist and writer, Mena Calthorpe, said of her, "What is astonishing is Lyndall Hadow's insight into women at so many different social levels. And not only women. To write about women, one must also write about man-woman relationship, and the writer handles these with rare skill." She had difficulty getting some of her work published partially due to content that was ahead of her time including Aboriginal issues and lesbianism. A second collection of short stories which she was working on just prior to her death was never published.

For many years Hadow was the West Australian editor of the magazine Our Women, the journal of the Union of Australian Women. She supported other writers and was a founding member of the FAWWA and a member of the WA Committee from 1955 to 1959. She was given a life membership to the FAW in 1976.

The Lyndall Hadow Annual Award for short stories, created by the FAWWA in 1977, later became the Stuart/Hadow Short Story Competition in honour of Hadow and her brother Donald Stuart. The FAWWA also published a tribute to Hadow, "She too is part of the glory".

Hadow Place, in the Canberra suburb of Gilmore, is named in her honour.

== Works ==
=== Collected stories ===
- Full Cycle and Other Stories (1969)

=== Other stories ===
- "A World to Gain" in The Tracks We Travel: Australian Short Stories 1953; (p. 15–20)
- "Period Piece in a Teacup" in The Bulletin, 20 August 1966 vol. 88 no. 4511; (p. 54–57)
- "Wait a Bit" in The Australian Journal, 1 April 1945 vol. 80 no. 949; (p. 260, 263–264)
- "Moody's Pub" in Pertinent, January 1947 vol. 4 no. 10; (p. 38–39)
- "Period Piece on the Fields" in Texas Quarterly, Summer 1962 vol. 5 no. 2; (p. 28–32)
