= Frederick Smith (Australian politician) =

Australian politician

Member of the Legislative Assembly of Western Australia
- In office 14 July 1932 – 25 March 1950
- Preceded by: John Lutey
- Succeeded by: None (abolished)
- Constituency: Brown Hill-Ivanhoe

Personal details
- Born: 11 November 1883 Reefton, New Zealand
- Died: 25 August 1960 (aged 76) Subiaco, Western Australia, Australia
- Party: Labor

Frederick Charles Lee Smith (11 November 1883 – 25 August 1960) was an Australian trade unionist, journalist, and politician who was a Labor Party member of the Legislative Assembly of Western Australia from 1932 to 1950, representing the seat of Brown Hill-Ivanhoe. He served as a minister in the government of John Willcock.

== Early life ==
Smith was born in Reefton, a small town on the west coast of New Zealand's South Island. He was taken to Australia as a small child, and spent his early years in Melbourne, Victoria. Smith arrived in Western Australia in 1904, and settled in Kalgoorlie, working for Kalgoorlie Electric Tramways in various capacities. He eventually became president of the Kalgoorlie Tramway Employees' Union. In 1922, Smith became manager of the Kalgoorlie office of the Westralian Worker, a newspaper associated with the Labor Party.

== Politics and later life ==
Smith first stood for parliament at the 1928 Legislative Council elections, but was defeated by the sitting Nationalist member, Harold Seddon, in North-East Province. He stood in North-East Province on another two occasions, but was unsuccessful both times, losing to Frederick Allsop (a fellow New Zealander) in 1930 and to Edgar Harris in 1932. In July 1932, Smith entered parliament as the member for Brown Hill-Ivanhoe, a Labor safe seat, winning unopposed the by-election caused by the death of John Lutey. He was re-elected unopposed at the 1933 and 1936 state elections.

When Philip Collier resigned as premier in August 1936, Smith was made Minister for Justice (the equivalent of attorney-general) and Minister for Railways in the new ministry formed by John Willcock. He was replaced in the ministry by Emil Nulsen after the 1939 election, and thereafter sat on the backbench until his retirement from parliament at the 1950 election. Smith died in Perth in 1960, aged 76. He had married Hester Mallett in 1912, with whom he had four daughters.

== See also ==
- Willcock Ministry

Parliament of Western Australia
Preceded by John Lutey	Member for Brown Hill-Ivanhoe; 1932–1950	Abolished
Political offices
Preceded by John Willcock	Minister for Justice; 1936–1939	Succeeded by Emil Nulsen
Preceded by John Willcock	Minister for Railways; 1936–1939	Succeeded by Emil Nulsen
