= Donald Stuart (Australian author) =

Australian Novelist (1913–1983)

Donald Robert Stuart (13 September 1913 – 25 August 1983) was an Australian novelist whose works include stories with Aboriginal backgrounds, and a series recounting his experience as a prisoner of war in Burma in World War II.

== Early career ==
Donald Stuart was born in Cottesloe, Western Australia and apart from his time spent overseas during World War II, he lived all his life in that state. His father was Julian Stuart, a poet and activist, and he was the brother of Lyndall Hadow, also a writer. Stuart left home at age 14 and began a career as a swagman (an itinerant who wandered the roads seeking casual work). He travelled through much of northern Western Australia finding work on cattle stations and it was during these years that he came into close contact with Aborigines.

== The war years ==
Stuart volunteered at the start of World War II for the 2nd Australian Imperial Force. He saw service in the Middle East as a 2/3rd Machine Gunner and then in Java, Indonesia, where he was captured by the Japanese. He then spent three and a half years as a POW. Along with Weary Dunlop, he was sent to work on the Burma Railway, a purgatory from which many did not return. In Stuart's own words:

"We built a railway from near Bangkok to near Rangoon—thousands of us POWs starved, scourged, racked with malaria, dysentery, beri-beri, pellagra and stinking tropical ulcers that ate a leg to the bone."

== Writing career ==
Stuart's first novel, Yandy, was published to critical acclaim in 1959. It became a modest best seller and was studied at the high school level in some Australian school systems. The events take place against the background of the 1946 Pilbara strike. The book was to set the tone for others that followed, causing literary critic Adam Shoemaker to write:

"Donald Stuart probably comes the closest of any White Australian writer during this period to a sensitive depiction of the Aboriginal people as Aboriginal human beings."

Yandy was followed by a series of novels featuring Aboriginal Australians as main characters. In Ilbarana and Malloonkai, Stuart attempts to view the world from the Aboriginal point of view, making him one of the few Australian writers, along with anthropologists such as T. G. H. Strehlow, Charles Pearcy Mountford, Ronald Berndt and Catherine Berndt, to even attempt to come close to a personal knowledge of Aboriginal people.

In 1974, Stuart published the first book in what would become the series known as The Conjuror's Years. Prince of My Country recounts the story of an Aboriginal station owner who makes a success of running his business, against all odds. This was set at a time when Aboriginal people were not allowed to vote, and they were little known for their skill as entrepreneurs. The next book is also pre-war, with the last four books mainly dealing with the war years, and especially the time spent on the Burma–Thailand railway.

== Death ==
Donald Stuart died in Broome in 1983.

== Bibliography ==
- Stuart, Donald (1959). Yandy. Melbourne: Georgian House.
- Stuart, Donald (1961). The Driven. London: Michael Joseph.
- Stuart, Donald (1962). Yaralie. London: Michael Joseph.
- Stuart, Donald R. (March 1965). "The blue horse". Meanjin Quarterly. 24 (1): 55–61.
- Stuart, Donald (1971). Ilbarana. Melbourne: Georgian House.
- Stuart, Donald (1973). Morning Star, Evening Star: Tales of Outback Australia. Melbourne: Georgian House.
- Stuart, Donald (1974). Prince of My Country. Melbourne: Georgian House.
- Stuart, Donald (1975). Walk, Trot, Canter and Die. Melbourne: Georgian House.
- Stuart, Donald (1976). Malloonkai. Melbourne: Georgian House.
- Stuart, Donald (1977). Drought Foal. Melbourne: Georgian House.
- Stuart, Donald (1978). Wedgetail View. Melbourne: Georgian House.
- Stuart, Donald (1979). Crank Back on Roller. Melbourne: Georgian House.
- Stuart, Donald (1981). I Think I'll Live. Melbourne: Georgian House.
- Stuart, Donald (1983). Broome Landscapes and People, photography by Roger Garwood. Fremantle Arts Centre Press.

== See also ==
- Australian outback literature of the 20th century
