= Nevanas affair =

Political scandal in Western Australia

The Nevanas affair was a political scandal in Western Australia that was partly responsible for the downfall of John Scaddan's Labor government.

Early in 1914, Scaddan and one of his ministers signed a contract with the London financier S. V. Nevanas, for the erection of a meat works in Wyndham at an estimated cost of £A 155,000, equivalent to A$20.6 million in 2022. They did so without consulting the rest of the cabinet, and against the advice of officers of the Public Works Department, who felt that the price was unrealistically low. Shortly afterwards, the government cancelled the contract on the grounds that the company had not complied with the conditions of the contract. However Nevanas received substantial financial compensation for the cancellation.

Many members of the Labor party were angered at the failure to call for public tenders, and the opposition were unsatisfied with the government's explanation for the cancellation. Eventually, a Select committee was set up to inquire into the matter. The committee's report revealed, amongst other findings, that Scaddan had written to Nevanas offering him management of the works. The report triggered an extensive and acrimonious debate in the Legislative Assembly in November 1915, during which the government was strongly opposed by three of its backbench members, Edward Heitmann, Bertie Johnston and George Taylor. The government survived a no-confidence vote by a single vote, and only by promising its backbench critics a leadership spill.

Despite this promise, caucus subsequently voted to confirm the existing ministry. In response, Bertie Johnston resigned from the party and parliament. He then contested the subsequent by-election as an independent, and won. This left the government with only 24 seats in a house of 50, and shortly afterwards the Scaddan government was defeated and forced to resign.

== General references ==
- Black, David (1 December 1981). "Party Politics in Turmoil". In C. T. Stannage (ed.). A New History of Western Australia. Nedlands: UWA Publishing. ISBN 0-85564-181-9. LCCN 82101009. OCLC 963830667. OL 3517729M. Wikidata Q125995168.
- Oliver, Bobbie (1995). War and Peace in Western Australia: The Social and Political Impact of the Great War. Nedlands, Western Australia: University of Western Australia Press. ISBN 1-875560-57-2.
