= 1920 Kalgoorlie by-election =

Australian federal by-election

- 18 December 1920
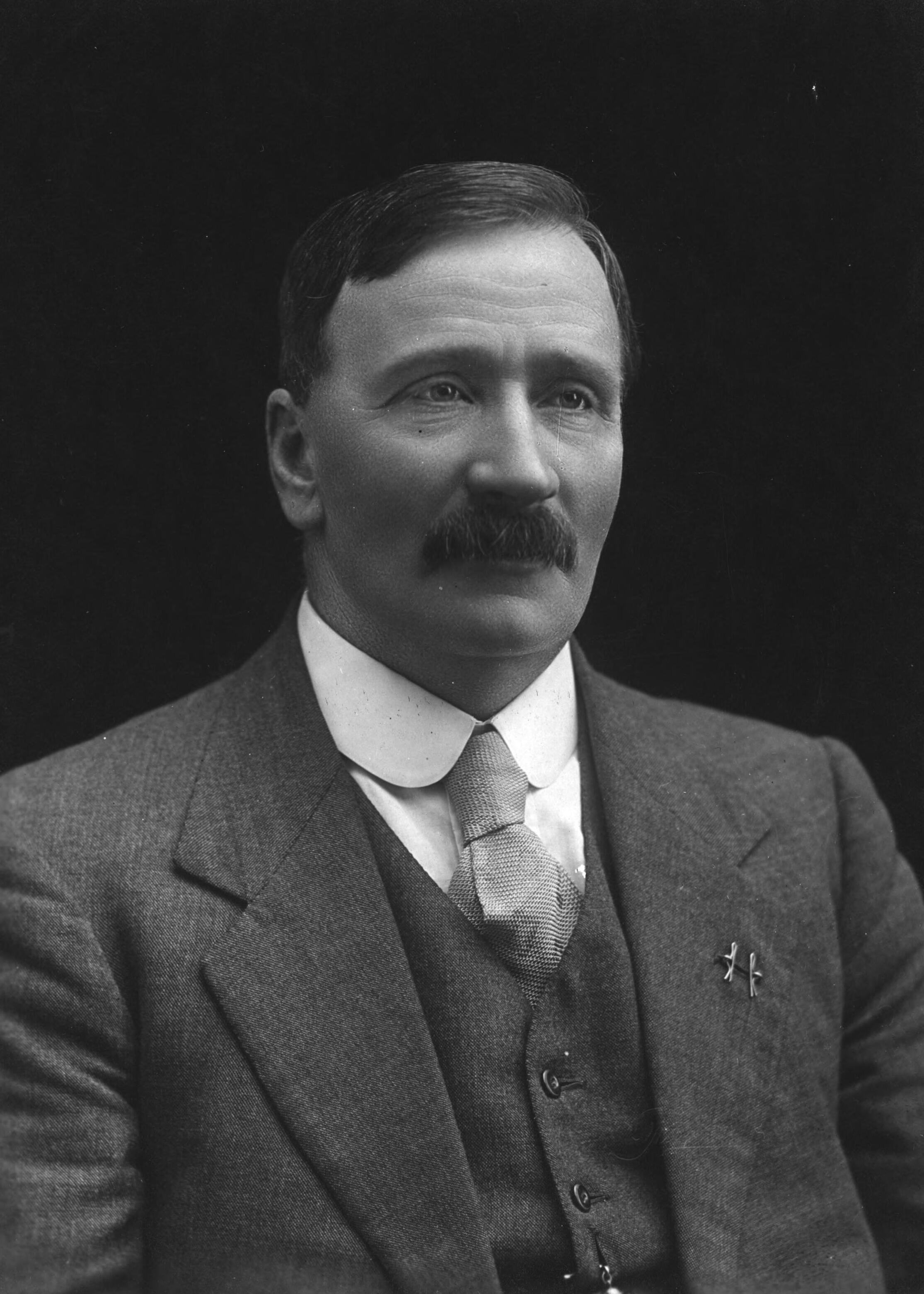

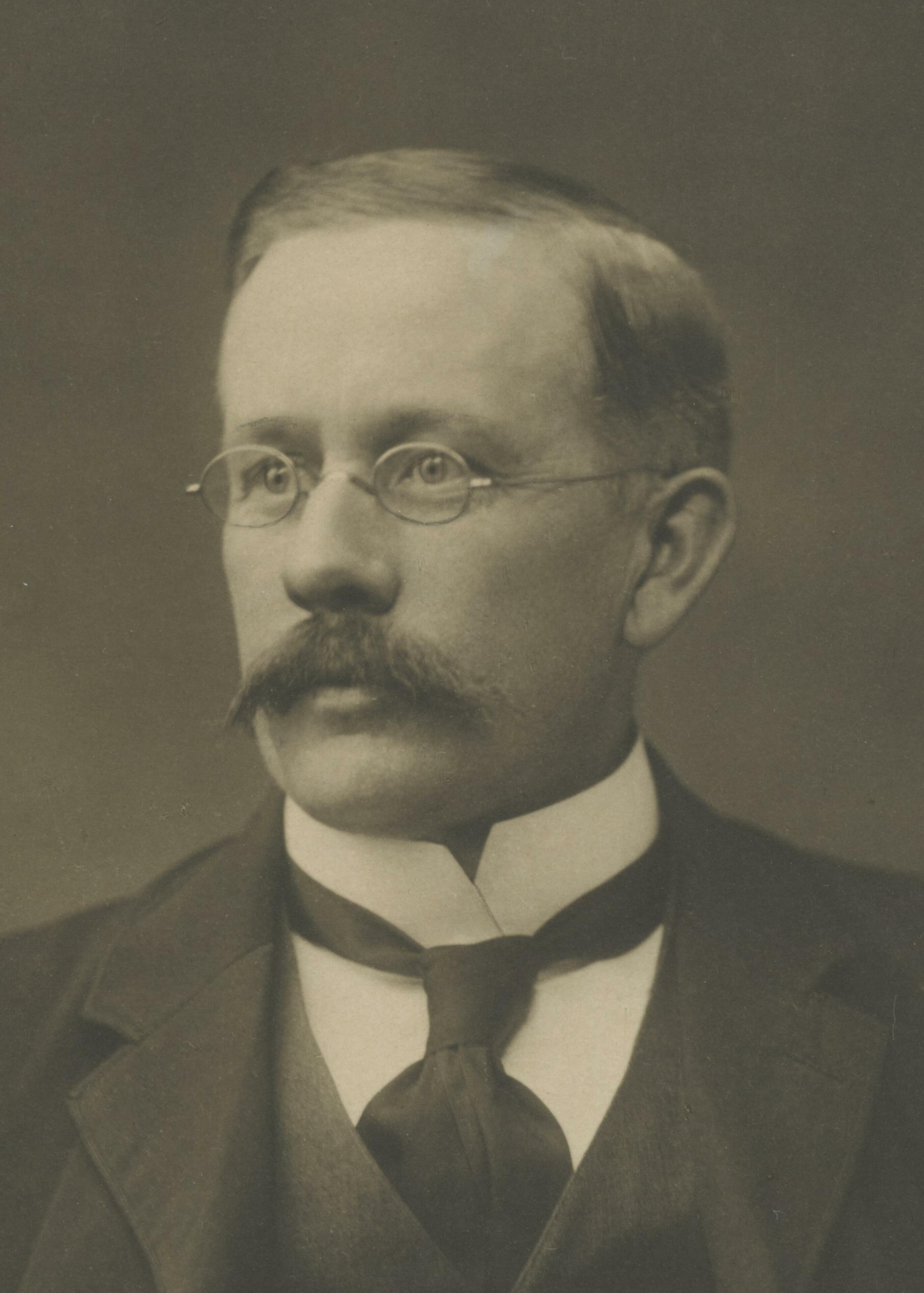
	First party	Second party
Candidate	George Foley	Hugh Mahon
Party	Nationalist	Labor
Popular vote	8,382	7,939
Percentage	51.4%	48.6%
Swing	▲3.5pp	▼3.5pp
MP before election
Hugh Mahon
Labor
Elected MP
George Foley
Nationalist

A by-election was held for the Australian House of Representatives seat of Kalgoorlie on 18 December 1920. It was triggered by the expulsion from the House of Labor Party MP Hugh Mahon.

The subsequent by-election was won by Nationalist Party candidate George Foley. It was the only federal by-election at which the government had won a seat from the opposition until the 2023 Aston by-election over 102 years later. Voting was not compulsory in 1920.

== Background ==
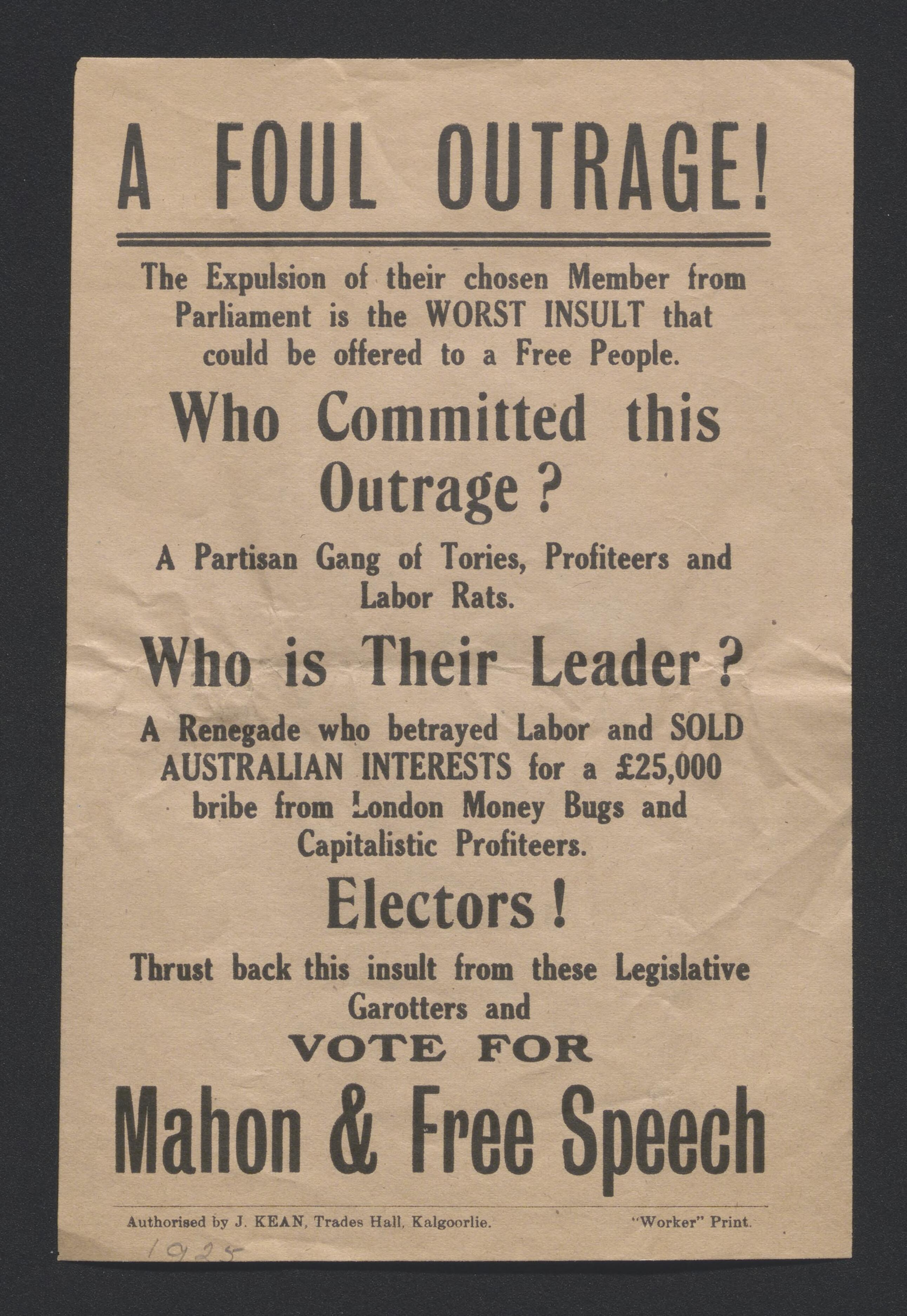
Campaign material used by the ALP

After the death of the Irish nationalist Terence McSwiney, as the result of a hunger strike in October 1920, Mahon attacked British policy in Ireland, and the British Empire as a whole, at an open-air meeting in Melbourne on 7 November, referring to it as "this bloody and accursed despotism". Subsequently, Prime Minister Billy Hughes moved to expel him from the House of Representatives. On 12 November, the House passed a resolution stating that Mahon had made "seditious and disloyal utterances at a public meeting" and was "guilty of conduct unfitting him to remain a member of this House and inconsistent with the oath of allegiance which he has taken as a member of this House". Mahon thereby became the only MP to be expelled from the Federal Parliament.

Under Section 8 of the Parliamentary Privileges Act 1987, neither house of the Australian Parliament now has the power to expel someone from membership of the Parliament.

== Results ==
Kalgoorlie by-election, 1920
Party	Candidate	Votes	%	±%
Nationalist	George Foley	8,382	51.4	+3.5
Labor	Hugh Mahon	7,939	48.6	−3.5
Total formal votes		16,321	99.3	+0.6
Informal votes		113	0.7	−0.6
Turnout		16,434	79.1	−0.2
Nationalist gain from Labor		Swing	+3.5	

== See also ==
- List of Australian federal by-elections
