= Frank Cowcher =

Australian politician

Member of the Legislative Assembly of Western Australia
- In office 28 June 1904 – 3 October 1911
- Preceded by: Frederick Piesse
- Succeeded by: None (abolished)
- Constituency: Williams

Personal details
- Born: 30 December 1854 Barragup, Western Australia, Australia
- Died: 4 August 1925 (aged 70) Williams, Western Australia, Australia

George Stanyford Francis "Frank" Cowcher (30 December 1854 – 4 August 1925) was an Australian farmer and politician who was a member of the Legislative Assembly of Western Australia from 1904 to 1911, representing the seat of Williams.

Cowcher was born in Barragup, a rural locality that is now a suburb of Mandurah. From a farming background, he became prominent in agricultural circles himself, helping to found the Williams Agricultural Society for the improvement of agriculture in the Williams district. Cowcher served on both the Wandering and Williams Road Boards at various stages, including as chairman of the latter. He entered parliament at the 1904 state election, winning 45.0 percent of the vote as an independent. He was subsequently re-elected with large majorities at the 1905 and 1908 elections, running as a Ministerialist. Prior to the 1911 election, Cowcher's seat was abolished and replaced with the seat of Williams-Narrogin. He attempted to move seats, but was defeated by Bertie Johnston of the Labor Party. He made one final run for parliament at the 1920 Legislative Council elections, but lost to James Greig in South-East Province. Cowcher died in Williams in August 1925, aged 70. He had married Emma Sophie Farmer in 1882, with whom he had four sons and four daughters.

Parliament of Western Australia
Preceded by Frederick Piesse	Member for Williams; 1904–1911	Abolished
