= Electoral district of Ivanhoe (Western Australia) =

Former state electoral district of Western Australia

Ivanhoe Western Australia—Legislative Assembly
- State: Western Australia
- Dates current: 1904–1911
- Demographic: Goldfields (Urban)

The Electoral district of Ivanhoe was a Legislative Assembly electorate in the state of Western Australia. It was named for a local settlement, and covered part of the Goldfields city of Boulder, near Kalgoorlie. It was created at the 1904 redistribution and was merged in 1911 with the neighbouring seat of Brown Hill to form the Electoral district of Brown Hill-Ivanhoe. The only Member for Ivanhoe was John Scaddan of the Labor Party.

== Members for Ivanhoe ==
Member	Party	Term
John Scaddan	Labor	1904–1911
