= Francis Rowe (politician) =

Australian politician

Member of the Legislative Assembly of Western Australia
- In office 26 March 1927 – 12 April 1930
- Preceded by: William Angwin
- Succeeded by: Hubert Parker
- Constituency: North-East Fremantle

Personal details
- Born: 22 September 1860 Richmond, Victoria, Australia
- Died: 23 October 1939 (aged 79) Fremantle, Western Australia, Australia
- Party: Labor

Francis James Rowe (22 September 1860 – 23 October 1939) was an Australian trade unionist and politician who was a Labor Party member of the Legislative Assembly of Western Australia from 1927 to 1930, representing the seat of North-East Fremantle.

Rowe was born in Melbourne to Susan Ann (née Stephens) and Francis Rowe. A trained stonemason, he arrived in Western Australia in 1900 and began working on the Fremantle Wharf. Rowe was elected secretary of the Fremantle Lumpers Union in 1902, and would serve in the position until entering parliament (including during the 1919 wharf riot). He also served on the board of Fremantle Hospital for 19 years, and was a member of the East Fremantle Municipal Council.

Prior to the 1924 state election, Rowe contested the Labor preselection ballot for the seat of Fremantle. He was narrowly defeated by Joseph Sleeman, a future Speaker of the Legislative Assembly. Rowe entered parliament at the 1927 election, replacing the retiring William Angwin in North-East Fremantle. His time in politics, however, as in 1930 he was defeated by Hubert Parker of the Nationalist Party. Rowe died in Fremantle in 1939, aged 79. He had married Rose Kaveney in 1887, but had no children.

Parliament of Western Australia
Preceded by William Angwin	Member for North-East Fremantle; 1927–1930	Succeeded by Hubert Parker
