= Victor Doney =

Australian politician

The Honourable Victor Doney

Member of the Legislative Assembly of Western Australia
- In office 7 November 1928 – 3 March 1950
- Preceded by: Bertie Johnston
- Succeeded by: None (abolished)
- Constituency: Williams-Narrogin
- In office 3 March 1950 – 7 April 1956
- Preceded by: None (new seat)
- Succeeded by: William Manning
- Constituency: Narrogin

Minister for Local Government
- In office 6 April 1950 – 23 February 1953
- Premier: Ross McLarty
- Preceded by: David Brand
- Succeeded by: Gilbert Fraser

Minister for Native Affairs
- In office 6 April 1950 – 23 February 1953
- Premier: Ross McLarty
- Preceded by: Hubert Parker
- Succeeded by: Bill Hegney

Minister for Works
- In office 1 April 1947 – 6 April 1950
- Premier: Ross McLarty
- Preceded by: Albert Hawke
- Succeeded by: David Brand

Minister for Water Supply
- In office 1 April 1947 – 6 April 1950
- Premier: Ross McLarty
- Preceded by: Albert Hawke
- Succeeded by: David Brand

Personal details
- Born: 25 December 1881 Lerryn, Cornwall, England
- Died: 12 October 1961 (aged 79) Mount Lawley, Western Australia, Australia
- Party: Country
- Spouse: Dorothy Mary Beech (m. 1920)
- Children: 3

Victor Doney (25 December 1881 – 12 October 1961) was an Australian politician who was a Country Party member of the Legislative Assembly of Western Australia from 1928 to 1956. He served as a minister in the government of Sir Ross McLarty.

Doney was born in Lerryn, Cornwall, England, to Rebecca (née Yeo) and Frank Doney. He came to Western Australia in 1912, and settled on a farm at Mullewa. Doney was elected to the Mullewa Road Board in 1914, and served as chairman for a period, but the following year enlisted in the Australian Imperial Force. He served in France with the 28th Battalion, and in July 1916 was wounded in action. Doney returned to Australia after being discharged in June 1919, and worked as a property inspector for the Agricultural Bank of Western Australia in Mullewa and Narrogin. He entered parliament at a by-election in November 1928, winning the seat of Williams-Narrogin unopposed after the resignation of Bertie Johnston.

After the 1947 state election, where a Liberal–Country coalition government, Doney was made Minister for Works and Minister for Water Supply in the new ministry formed by Ross McLarty. His seat was abolished at the 1950 election, and he transferred to the new seat of Narrogin. After that election, a ministerial reshuffle occurred, with Doney becoming Chief Secretary, Minister for Local Government, and Minister for Native Affairs. He remained in the ministry until the government's defeat at the 1953 election, and left parliament at the 1956 election. Doney died in Perth in October 1961, aged 79. He had married Dorothy Mary Beech in 1920, with whom he had three children.

Parliament of Western Australia
Preceded by Bertie Johnston	Member for Williams-Narrogin; 1928–1950	Abolished
New seat	Member for Narrogin; 1950–1956	Succeeded by William Manning
Political offices
Preceded by Albert Hawke	Minister for Works; 1947–1950	Succeeded by David Brand
Preceded by Albert Hawke	Minister for Water Supply; 1947–1950	Succeeded by David Brand
Preceded by Hubert Parker	Chief Secretary; 1950–1953	Succeeded by Gilbert Fraser
Preceded by David Brand	Minister for Local Government; 1950–1953	Succeeded by Gilbert Fraser
Preceded by Hubert Parker	Minister for Native Affairs; 1950–1953	Succeeded by Bill Hegney
