= Julian Stuart =

Australian writer, trade unionist and politician (1866–1929)

John Alexander Salmon "Julian" Stuart (18 December 1866 – 3 July 1929) was an Australian trade unionist, journalist, poet and politician.

== Early career ==
John Alexander Salmon Stuart was born in Raymond Terrace, New South Wales, and grew up on the Clarence River. After a short-lived career as a school teacher and then as a clerk in Sydney, Stuart began to live the life of an itinerant worker, moving about rural New South Wales and Queensland. As he became more aware of the poor working conditions of shearers and other farm workers, he became more and more involved with the budding trade union movement. As one of the leaders of the 1891 Australian shearers' strike, Stuart was jailed and sentenced to three years' imprisonment with hard labour. Upon release from jail, Stuart worked for the Labour Electoral League, the forerunner of the New South Wales Labor Party.

== Western Australia ==
In 1895, Stuart and his new wife moved to Coolgardie with the idea of working the goldfields. Life on the goldfields was tough and in 1901, Stuart finally gave up on the idea of prospecting and moved to Kalgoorlie, where he undertook a variety of jobs, and became an active member of the Australian Workers' Association. In 1902, he was elected to the Board of the Westralian Worker, the state's first labor newspaper, and then as editor in 1903. By this time, he was also a regular contributor to The Bulletin. In 1906, he was elected to the Western Australian Legislative Assembly, representing the seat of Mount Leonora.

== Works ==
- Stuart, Julian (1967). Part of the Glory. Australasian Book Society, Sydney.

== Later years ==
In 1919, Julian Stuart was injured in an accident at a timber mill and became an invalid. Nevertheless, he continued to write for various publications, including The Bulletin, the Brisbane Worker and the Western Mail. He died in Perth in 1929. He was survived by his wife and five children, including the writers Lyndall Hadow and Donald Stuart.
