= George Foley (politician) =

Australian politician

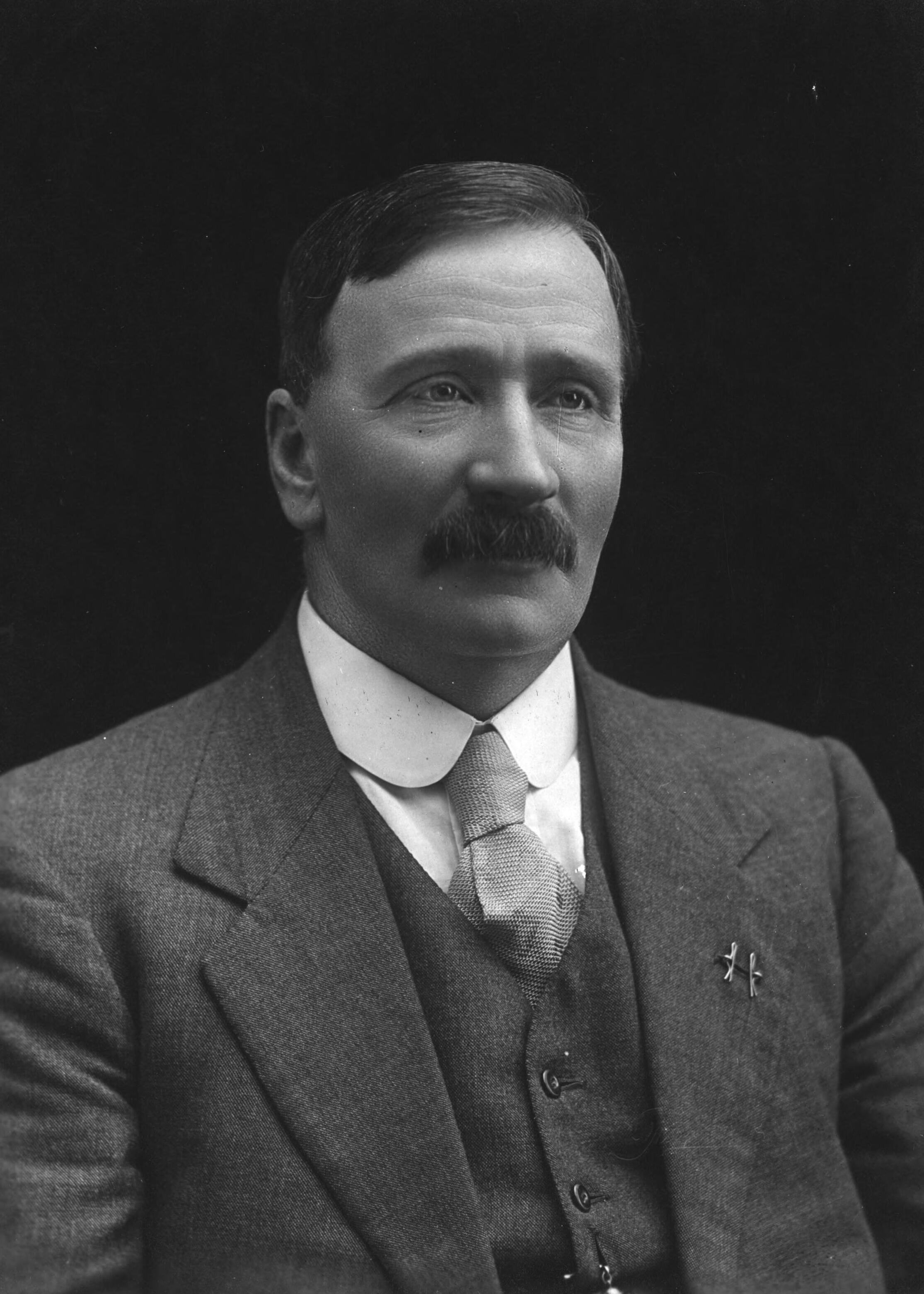

Member of the Australian Parliament for Kalgoorlie
- In office 18 December 1920 – 16 December 1922
- Preceded by: Hugh Mahon
- Succeeded by: Albert Green

Personal details
- Born: 28 November 1872 Walhalla, Victoria
- Died: 27 October 1945 (aged 72) Mount Hawthorn, Western Australia
- Party: Labor (1911–17); National Labor (1917–20); Nationalist (1920–22)
- Spouse: Fannie Gill
- Occupation: Miner and auctioneer

George James Foley (28 November 1872 – 27 October 1945) was an Australian politician from Western Australia. He was the member for the Western Australian seat of Mount Leonora from 1911 until 1920, initially for the Labor Party until 1917 when he joined the National Labor Party. He then entered the Federal House of Representatives as the Nationalist member for the seat of Kalgoorlie, which he held until 1922.

== Early life ==
Foley was born in Walhalla on the Victorian goldfields to Thomas Foley, a miner and railway employee, and Elizabeth Foley (née Stamp). He was educated at local schools before entering a state training college in Melbourne and gaining employment with a newspaper in Richmond. He moved to Western Australia in 1895 and took up gold mining, becoming part-owner of the Grace Darling mine at Broad Arrow. On 27 January 1902, he married Fannie Gill at the Wesley Church in Kalgoorlie. He joined the Federated Miners Union and served as its Gwalia branch president, and later became president of the North Goldfields Council of the Labor Federation.

== State politics ==
Prior to the October 1911 state election, he was selected by Labor to contest the seat of Mount Leonora; he obtained 1,019 of the 1,172 valid votes cast and entered the Legislative Assembly. He won the seat without opposition at the 1914 election.

In March 1917, the Labor Party split in Western Australia ahead of the 1917 federal election, and a number of Labor members, including Foley, either resigned from the Party or were expelled for supporting Nationalist Senate candidates. Former premier John Scaddan and several others formed the National Labor Party with a base in the Goldfields region. Foley won the state election later that year easily against a Labor opponent. In 1918, he was also elected to the Perth City Council for a one-year term.

== Federal politics ==
On 18 November 1920, Foley resigned from the Legislative Assembly to contest the Kalgoorlie federal by-election, which had been called due to the expulsion of Labor member Hugh Mahon from the House of Representatives. Foley contested the by-election as a Nationalist Party member, and won against Mahon. He was defeated at the 1922 election, and failed to win the state seat of Kimberley at the 1924 election. He worked as an auctioneer in Perth before retiring to Kalgoorlie.

== Personal life ==
George Foley died on 27 October 1945 in the Perth suburb of Mount Hawthorn and was buried in the Congregationalist section of Karrakatta Cemetery. He had no children.

Parliament of Australia
Preceded by Hugh Mahon	Member for Kalgoorlie; 1920–1922	Succeeded by Albert Green
