= Thomas Heron =

Australian politician

Thomas John Heron

Member of the Legislative Assembly of Western Australia
- In office 14 December 1920 – 3 October 1928
- Preceded by: George Foley
- Succeeded by: Ernest Cowan
- Constituency: Mount Leonora

Personal details
- Born: 14 August 1879 Eldorado, Victoria, Australia
- Died: 3 October 1928 (aged 49) West Perth, Western Australia, Australia
- Party: Labor

Thomas John Heron (14 August 1879 – 3 October 1928) was an Australian trade unionist and politician. He served as a member of the Legislative Assembly of Western Australia for the Labor Party, representing the seat of Mount Leonora from 1920 until his death in 1928.

Born in Eldorado, Victoria, to Isabella Ann (née Gilbertson) and Thomas Heron, he migrated to Western Australia in 1901. Initially working as a miner in the Eastern Goldfields, Heron lived in Menzies and Kookynie before becoming president of the Gwalia branch of the Miners' Union. His political career began with the 1920 Mount Leonora by-election, following the resignation of George Foley. He was subsequently re-elected three times. Heron tragically collapsed and died in the reading room at Parliament House in October 1928, at the age of 49. He was married to Wilhelmina Ahrens since 1902, and they had three children.

Parliament of Western Australia
Preceded by George Foley	Member for Mount Leonora; 1920–1928	Succeeded by Ernest Cowan
