= Electoral district of Mount Leonora =

Former state electoral district of Western Australia

Mount Leonora Western Australia—Legislative Assembly
- State: Western Australia
- Dates current: 1904–1930
- Namesake: Mount Leonora

Mount Leonora was an electoral district of the Legislative Assembly in the Australian state of Western Australia from 1904 to 1930.

The district was located in the Goldfields region, and was based in the town of Leonora. It was generally a Labor seat, although sitting member George Foley sided with the conscriptionists in the Labor split during World War I. Foley was re-elected was a National Labor Party candidate at the 1917 state election before resigning his seat to stand as the Nationalist candidate at the 1920 by-election for the federal seat of Kalgoorlie; a contest he won.

== Members ==
| Members | Party | Term |
|---|---|---|
| Patrick Lynch | Labor | 1904–1906 |
| Julian Stuart | Labor | 1906–1908 |
| Hugh Gourley | Labor | 1908–1911 |
| George Foley | Labor | 1911–1917 |
| George Foley | National Labor | 1917–1920 |
| Thomas Heron | Labor | 1920–1928 |
| Ernest Cowan | Labor | 1928–1930 |
