= George Rainsford (politician) =

Australian politician

George Henry Rainsford (25 January 1873 – 16 April 1940) was an Australian politician. He was elected to the Western Australian Legislative Council for South Province as a Nationalist in a by-election following Jabez Dodd's death in 1928, but he was never sworn in and he did not take his seat due to the approaching election, in which he was defeated.
