= Ernest Cowan =

Australian politician

Peter Ernest Cowan (3 January 1882 – 7 May 1955) was a Member of the Western Australian Legislative Assembly from 1928 to 1930.

Born in Wallaroo, South Australia on 3 January 1882, he was the son of farmer Robert Cowan and Christina née McMartin. Nothing is known of his early life until 1894, when he arrived in Esperance, Western Australia. On 31 October 1914 he married Lilly Mary Prisk, with whom he had five sons and four daughters.

Cowan spent most of his life prospecting for gold on the north-eastern goldfields of Western Australia. In 1918 he was working as a labourer on the Gwalia woodline, and the following year settled at Leonora, where he worked as a timber-cutter and labour. In 1828 he was working as a barman when he successfully contested a Legislative Assembly by-election for the seat of Mount Leonora on a Labor ticket. He held the seat until its abolition at the election of 12 April 1930. In that election he contested the seat of Mount Magnet, but was defeated by the Labor incumbent Michael Troy.

From 1934 to 1937, Cowan worked as a labourer at Lake Darlot. In 1939 he worked as a cyanide solutionist at the Victory battery at Leonora. In the general election of 29 April 1944 he contested a Western Australian Legislative Council North East Province seat as an Independent Labor candidate, but was unsuccessful. In 1946 he was working as a shop assistant.

Cowan suffered from silicosis in later life. He died at the Wooroloo Sanatorium on 7 May 1955, and was buried in Karrakatta Cemetery.
