= Electoral district of Williams-Narrogin =

Former electoral district in Western Australia

Williams-Narrogin Western Australia—Legislative Assembly
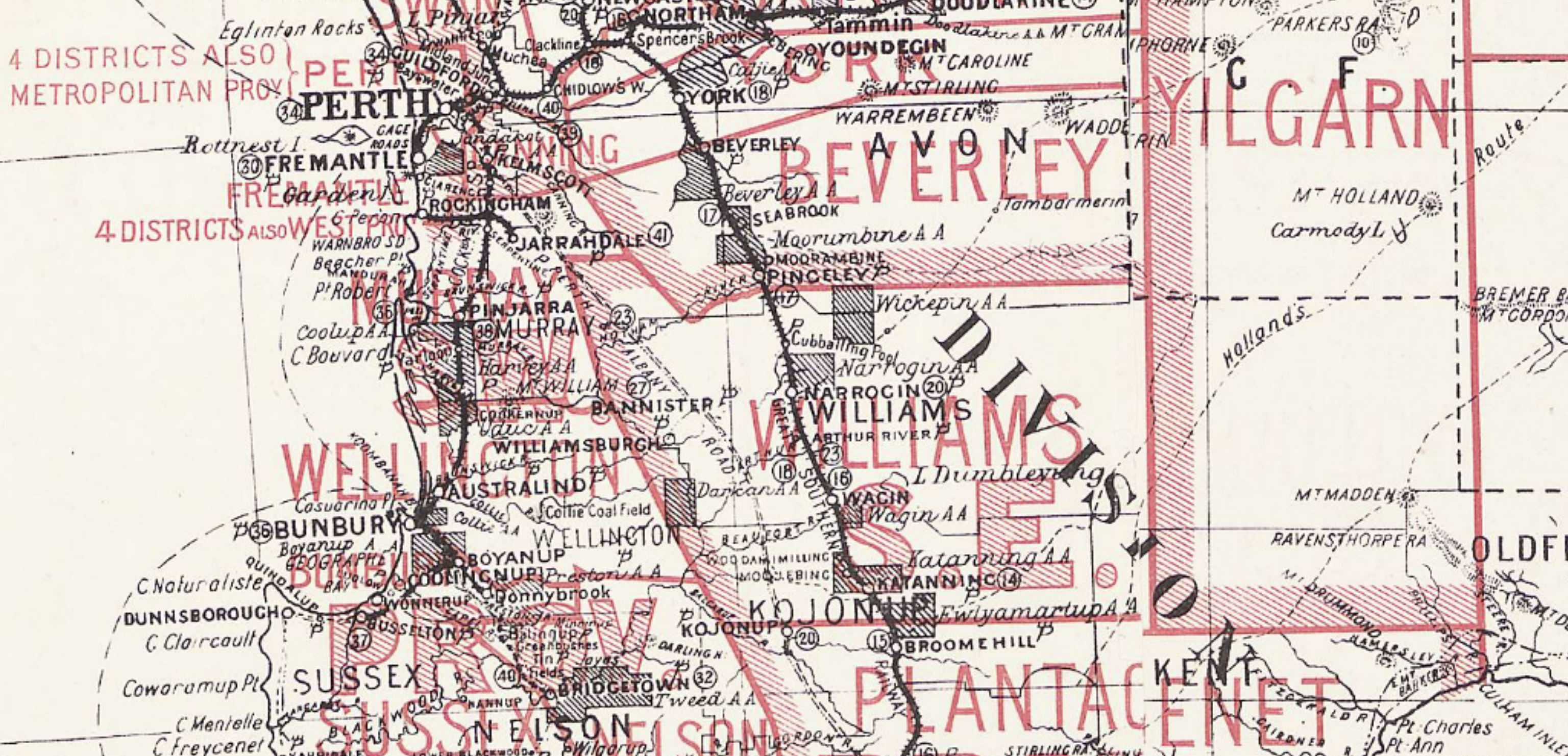
- Williams and surrounds in 1898
- State: Western Australia
- Dates current: 1890–1950^{1}
- Namesake: Williams

Footnotes
- ^{1} known as Williams-Narrogin 1911–1950

Williams was an electoral district of the Legislative Assembly in the Australian state of Western Australia from 1890 to 1950.

A rural district named for the town of Williams in Western Australia's Wheatbelt region, it was one of the original 30 districts contested at the 1890 election. In 1898, it included the towns of Bannister, Narrogin, Darkan, Arthur River, Wagin, Katanning, Woodanilling, and Moojebing.

The name of the district was changed to Williams-Narrogin at the 1911 election, the same election which saw Bertie Johnston of the Labor Party elected as its representative. Johnston resigned from the Labor Party in December 1915 over issues with the Scaddan government, and resigned his seat in Parliament. He recontested (unopposed, as it turned out) the resulting by-election and was thus re-elected as an independent. His actions brought about the downfall of the Labor government of John Scaddan in August 1916 when it next met. Johnston briefly served as Speaker in February 1917, however, his former Labor colleagues opposed his appointment and refused to respect his authority, forcing him to resign after just a few days in favour of James Gardiner. Later in 1917, he joined the Country Party.

Williams-Narrogin was abolished ahead of the 1950 election, and was replaced by the seat of Narrogin. Sitting member Victor Doney of the Country Party transferred to the new Narrogin seat.

== Members ==
Williams (1890–1911)
Member	Party	Term
Frederick Henry Piesse	Ministerial	1890–1904
Frank Cowcher	Ministerial	1904–1911
Williams-Narrogin (1911–1950)
Member	Party	Term
Bertie Johnston	Labor	1911–1915
Bertie Johnston	Independent	1916–1917
Bertie Johnston	Country	1917–1923
Bertie Johnston	Country (ECP)	1923–1924
Bertie Johnston	Country	1924–1928
Victor Doney	Country	1928–1950
