= Electoral district of North-East Fremantle =

Former electoral district of Western Australia

North-East Fremantle Western Australia—Legislative Assembly
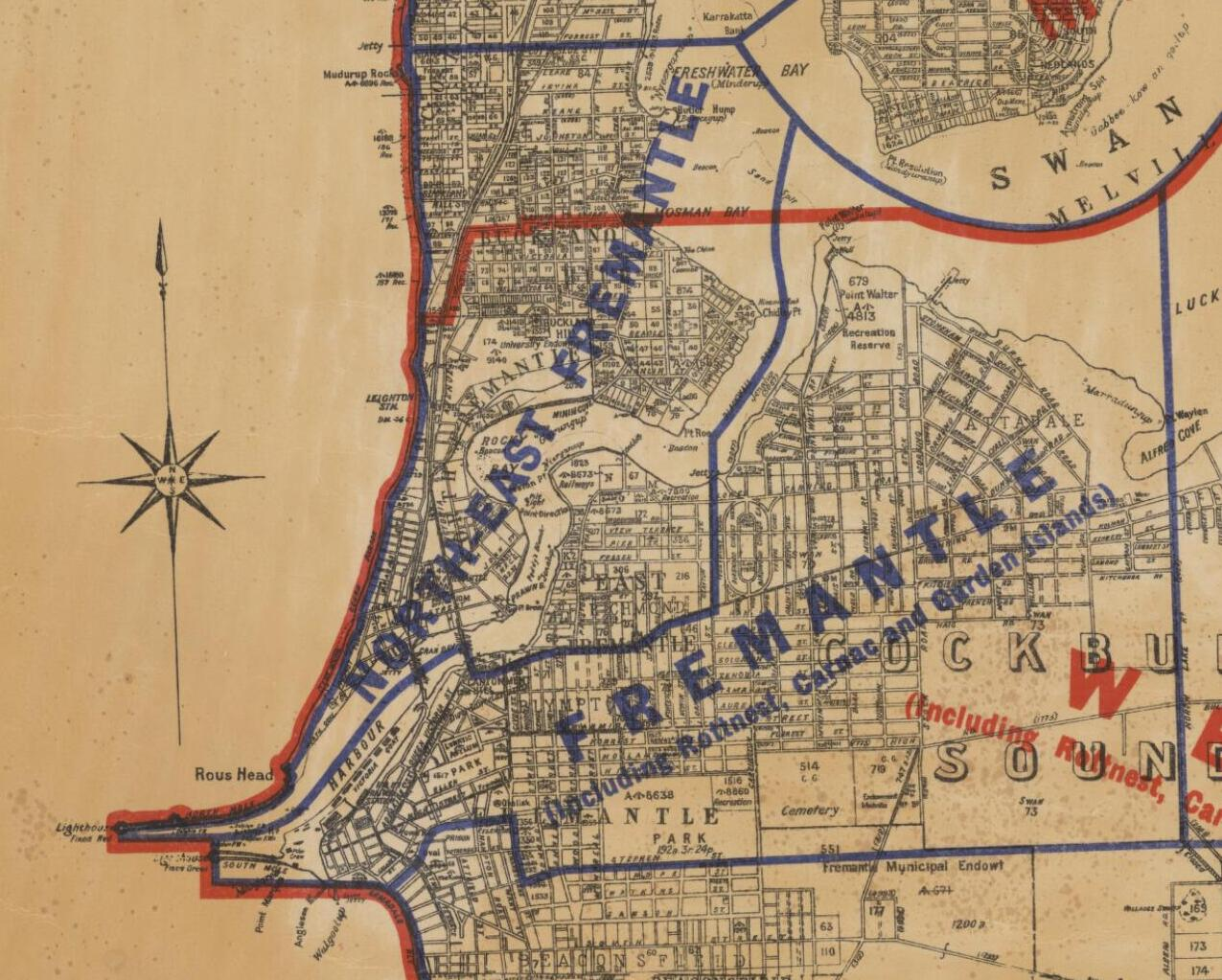
- Boundaries in 1943
- State: Western Australia
- Dates current: 1911–1950
- Namesake: North Fremantle; East Fremantle

North-East Fremantle was an electoral district of the Legislative Assembly in the Australian state of Western Australia from 1911 to 1950.

Based in urban Fremantle, the district was first contested at the 1911 state election, being an amalgam of the former districts of North Fremantle and East Fremantle. Its first member was William Angwin of the Labor Party, formerly the member for East Fremantle. The district ceased to exist at the 1950 state election, when Labor member John Tonkin transferred to the new district of Melville. Tonkin later became Premier of Western Australia from 1971 to 1974.

== Members ==
Member	Party	Term
William Angwin	Labor	1911–1927
Francis Rowe	Labor	1927–1930
Hubert Parker	Nationalist	1930–1933
John Tonkin	Labor	1933–1950
