= Bertie Johnston =

Australian politician (1880–1942)

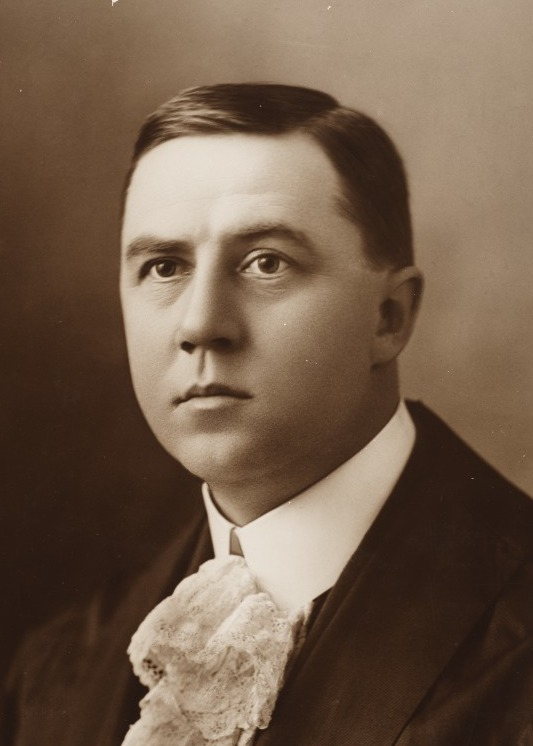
- Johnston in 1917

Senator for Western Australia
- In office 1 July 1929 – 6 September 1942
- Succeeded by: Charles Latham

6th Speaker of the Western Australian Legislative Assembly
- In office 13 February 1917 – 1 March 1917
- Preceded by: Frank Troy
- Succeeded by: James Gardiner

Member of the Western Australian Legislative Assembly for Williams-Narrogin
- In office 30 October 1911 – 7 November 1928
- Preceded by: Frank Cowcher
- Succeeded by: Victor Doney

Personal details
- Born: 11 January 1880 Geraldton, Western Australia
- Died: 6 September 1942 (aged 62) Black Rock, Victoria
- Party: Labor (1911–15); Independent (1915–17); Country (1917–42)
- Spouse: Hildelith Olymphe King-Lethbridge
- Children: 3
- Occupation: Farmer

Edward Bertram Johnston (11 January 1880 – 6 September 1942), known as Bertie Johnston, was the Western Australian Legislative Assembly member for Williams-Narrogin from 1911 to 1928, and a Senator from 1929 until 1942. His resignation from the Australian Labor Party in 1915 made possible the defeat of John Scaddan's Labor government in Western Australia.

== Early life ==
Johnston was born in Geraldton, Western Australia on 11 January 1880, the son of Harry Johnston, Surveyor-General of Western Australia. He was educated at High School (now Hale School) in Perth, and from 1895 to 1909 was employed as a clerk in the Lands and Surveys Department. He later became a wheat and sheep farmer near Narrogin, and a substantial investor in hotels and real estate.

== State politics ==
Johnston joined the Australian Labor Party, and on 3 October 1911 was elected to the Western Australian Legislative Assembly seat of Williams-Narrogin. In his first term he largely supported John Scaddan's Labor government, but after being re-elected in 1914 he became an outspoken backbench critic of the government, and voted against it on a number of occasions. Johnston was the only Labor member for a farming seat after 1914, and he was greatly angered by Scaddan's failure to honour a promise to lower the price of crown land.

Late in 1914, the Scaddan government faced a no-confidence vote over its handling of the Nevanas affair. Johnston and the government's other main backbench critics, Edward Heitmann and George Taylor, were convinced not to bring down the government by the promise of a leadership spill. They voted with the government, and the government won by a single vote. However, the caucus subsequently voted to confirm the existing ministry. In protest, Johnston resigned from the Labor party and from parliament on 18 December 1915. He then contested the resulting by-election as an independent, and won. This left the government with just 24 seats in a house of 50. Scaddan's minority government was permitted to continue for six months, but in July 1916 it was defeated.

Despite the defeat of the Labor party, a Labor member, Michael Troy, remained Speaker, thus giving Frank Wilson's government an extra vote. In February 1917, Labor moved a motion of censure against the government, and Johnston indicated his intention to move an amendment. Under the assumption that Johnston would support the censure as amended, Troy resigned as Speaker in order to give the Labor party sufficient numbers to defeat the government. However at the last minute Wilson and the leader of the Country Party Francis Willmott persuaded their followers to accept Johnston's nomination as Speaker. Johnston became Speaker on 13 February 1917, and the government were then able to defeat the censure motion by a single vote. Greatly angered by what they saw as a betrayal, the Labor members refused to accept Johnston's authority. When during a heated argument Johnston commanded Labor member John Holman to leave the chamber, Holman refused and a policeman was called to eject him. A number of Labor members then physically prevented Holman's removal. Johnston was forced to suspend the sitting, and the following day he resigned as Speaker, to be replaced by former leader of the Country party James Gardiner.

Johnston won his seat as a Country Party candidate in the election of September 1917, and would hold it for the Country Party until 1928. From 1923 until 1928, he was Deputy Leader of the Country Party.

== Federal politics ==
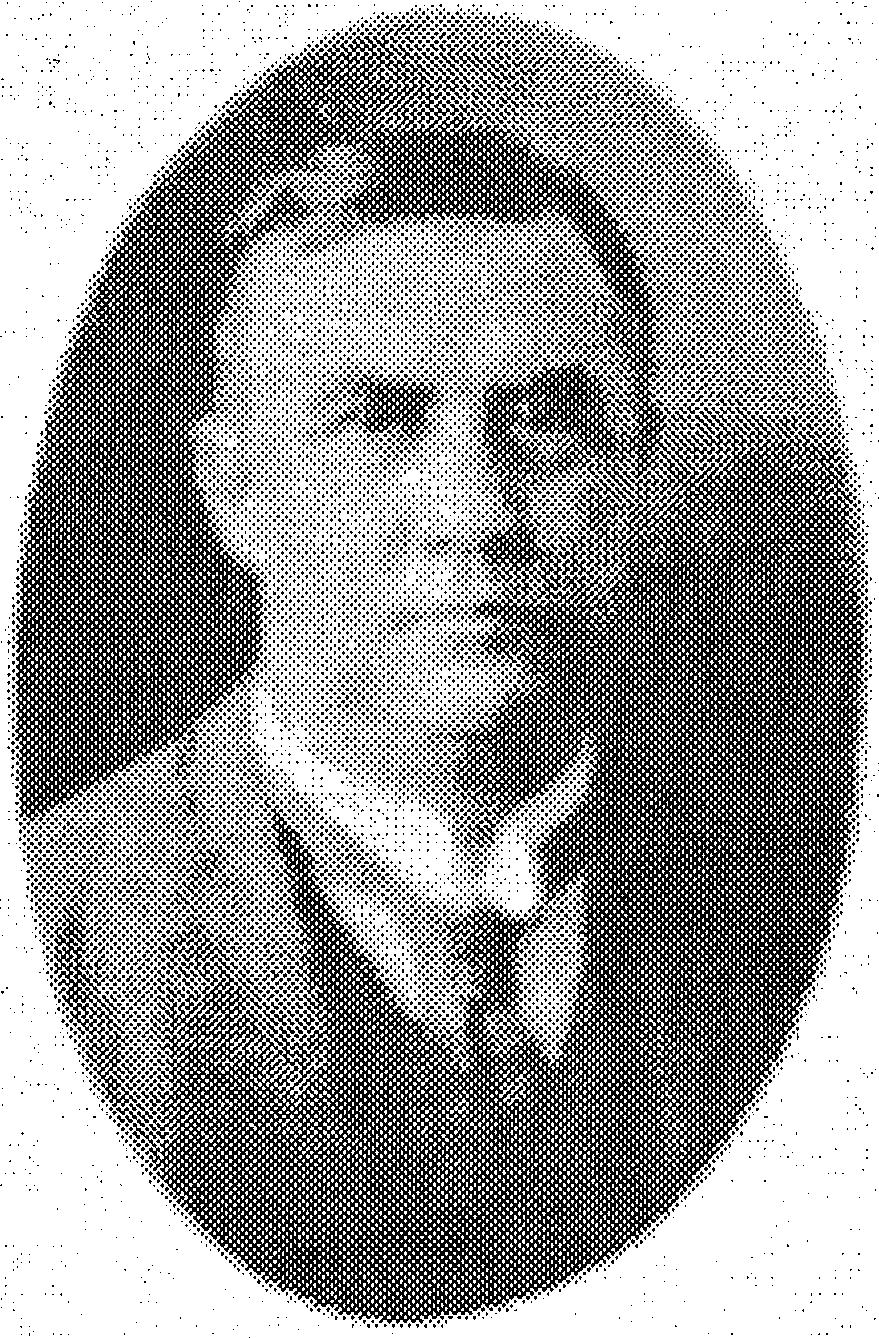
Undated photo

Johnston resigned his Legislative Assembly seat on 3 October 1928, and on 17 November was elected to the Australian Senate for the federal Country Party. He took up his seat in the Senate on 1 July 1929, and remained a senator until his death in 1942.

== Personal life ==
On 18 February 1931, Johnston married Hildelith Olymphe King-Lethbridge. He fathered three daughters, one of whom married David Wordsworth, a future member of the Western Australian Legislative Council. Johnston owned a number of hotels in the Perth metropolitan area (including the Captain Stirling Hotel), as well as significant investments in rural Western Australia.

On 6 September 1942, he drowned at Black Rock, Melbourne, Victoria.

== General references ==
- Black, David (1 December 1981). "Party Politics in Turmoil". In C. T. Stannage (ed.). A New History of Western Australia. Nedlands: UWA Publishing. ISBN 0-85564-181-9. LCCN 82101009. OCLC 963830667. OL 3517729M. Wikidata Q125995168.
- Black, David; Bolton, Geoffrey (2001a). Biographical Register of Members of the Parliament of Western Australia. Vol. One: 1870–1930 (Revised ed.). Parliament House: Parliament of Western Australia. ISBN 0730738140.

Western Australian Legislative Assembly
Preceded by Frank Cowcher	Member for Williams-Narrogin; 1911–1928	Succeeded by Victor Doney
Preceded by Frank Troy	Speaker of the Western Australian Legislative Assembly; 1917	Succeeded by James Gardiner
