= Electoral district of Brown Hill-Ivanhoe =

Former state electoral district of Western Australia

Brown Hill-Ivanhoe Western Australia—Legislative Assembly
- State: Western Australia
- Dates current: 1911–1950
- Demographic: Goldfields (Urban)

The Electoral district of Brown Hill-Ivanhoe (sometimes styled Brownhill-Ivanhoe) was a Legislative Assembly electorate in the state of Western Australia. It covered part of the Goldfields city of Boulder, near Kalgoorlie, and neighbouring mining areas. It was created at the 1911 redistribution out of the former seats of Brown Hill and Ivanhoe, and was first contested at the 1911 election. It was abolished in the 1948 redistribution, with its area split between the neighbouring electorates of Boulder and Hannans, taking effect from the 1950 election. The seat was a very safe one for the Labor Party.

== History ==
Its first member, who had previously been the member for Ivanhoe since 1904, was Opposition Leader John Scaddan. The election at which the seat was created, held on 3 October 1911, swept Labor to power in Western Australia, and Scaddan was shortly thereafter sworn in as Premier. The Labor government completed its first term in office successfully, but struggled in its second and by the end of 1915 had lost its majority in the Assembly. On 27 July 1916, following a successful want of confidence motion on the floor of the Assembly, Scaddan resigned as Premier and became Opposition Leader once again. His replacement as Premier, the Liberal Party's Frank Wilson, appointed a six-member ministry who, having accepted an office of profit under the crown, were obliged to resign their seats and stand for ministerial by-elections. Scaddan opted to resign his seat on 8 August to contest one of the incoming ministers, Robert Robinson in Canning. On 19 August 1916, Labor candidate John Lutey was elected unopposed to fill the vacancy. However, upon Scaddan's narrow loss in Canning, Lutey resigned from the seat on 15 September 1916 before being sworn in to allow Scaddan to regain his seat, which he did at the resulting by-election on 7 October 1916 against two minor-party candidates.

Scaddan became caught up in the conscription crisis which split the Labor Party nationally. A considerable number of Western Australian Labor members supported conscription, although the party's platform was opposed to it. A plebiscite held on the question at the initiative of Prime Minister Billy Hughes showed Western Australia as a whole to be strongly supportive of conscription, with almost 70% voting yes as against 48% nationally. The Western Australian party led by its secretary Alick McCallum initially adopted an approach which allowed both sides to disagree amicably and remain in the movement, but ultimately, this proved impossible as the 1917 federal election loomed and Labor members were forced to choose between the Official Labor and National Labor Senate teams. Scaddan's own position was unclear until, on 6 April 1917, he wrote a letter to McCallum stating that he was "compelled to give first consideration to the dictates of his national conscience as against his party conscience", and as such would stand by Hughes. By June, a Nationalist grouping had developed which was led by Henry Lefroy and incorporated National Labor and the Country Party as coalition partners with the former Liberal Party. Scaddan was appointed as a minister in the new government on 28 June 1917 and had to resign and contest a by-election. A very hostile campaign followed, led by the Westralian Worker newspaper and by McCallum himself, and on 21 July 1917, Scaddan was defeated by John Lutey, who claimed the victory as a triumph of principles over men. This was only the second occasion in Western Australia's parliamentary history—the first having been the defeat of half of the Morgans Ministry in December 1901—that a Minister had failed to retain his seat at a ministerial by-election resulting from his appointment.

Lutey served as Chairman of Committees from 1924 until 1930 under Philip Collier's administration, and remained the member for the seat until his death in 1932. At the resulting by-election, Frederick Smith was returned unopposed on 14 July 1932. He served as Minister for Justice and Minister for Railways in the Willcock Ministry from 1936 until 1939. He held the seat until its abolishment at the 1950 election, at which he retired from politics.

== Members for Brown Hill-Ivanhoe ==
Image	Member	Party	Term	Notes
	John Scaddan	Labor	3 October 1911 – 8 August 1916	Premier of Western Australia from 1911 until 1916. Resigned to unsuccessfully contest Canning by-election
	John Lutey	Labor	19 August 1916 – 15 September 1916	Won by-election. Resigned seat before being sworn in to allow John Scaddan to re-contest
	John Scaddan	Labor	7 October 1916 – 7 April 1917	Won by-election. Resigned from Labor Party. Lost by-election
	John Scaddan	National Labor	7 April 1917 – 28 June 1917	Won by-election. Resigned from Labor Party. Lost by-election
	John Lutey	Labor	21 July 1917 – 22 June 1932	Won by-election. Died in office
	Frederick Smith	Labor	14 July 1932 – 25 March 1950	Won by-election

== Bibliography ==
- Black, David and John Mandy (eds) (2002). The Western Australian Parliamentary Handbook (Twentieth edition) (revised). Parliament of Western Australia, Parliament House, Perth, Western Australia.
- Black, David (1 December 1981). "Party Politics in Turmoil". In C. T. Stannage (ed.). A New History of Western Australia. Nedlands: UWA Publishing. ISBN 0-85564-181-9. LCCN 82101009. OCLC 963830667. OL 3517729M. Wikidata Q125995168.
- Robertson, John R. (1958). The Scaddan government and the conscription crisis, 1911-17 : aspects of Western Australia's political history (thesis). University of Western Australia. Accessed in Special Collections, Reid Library, UWA.
