= John Lutey =

Australian politician

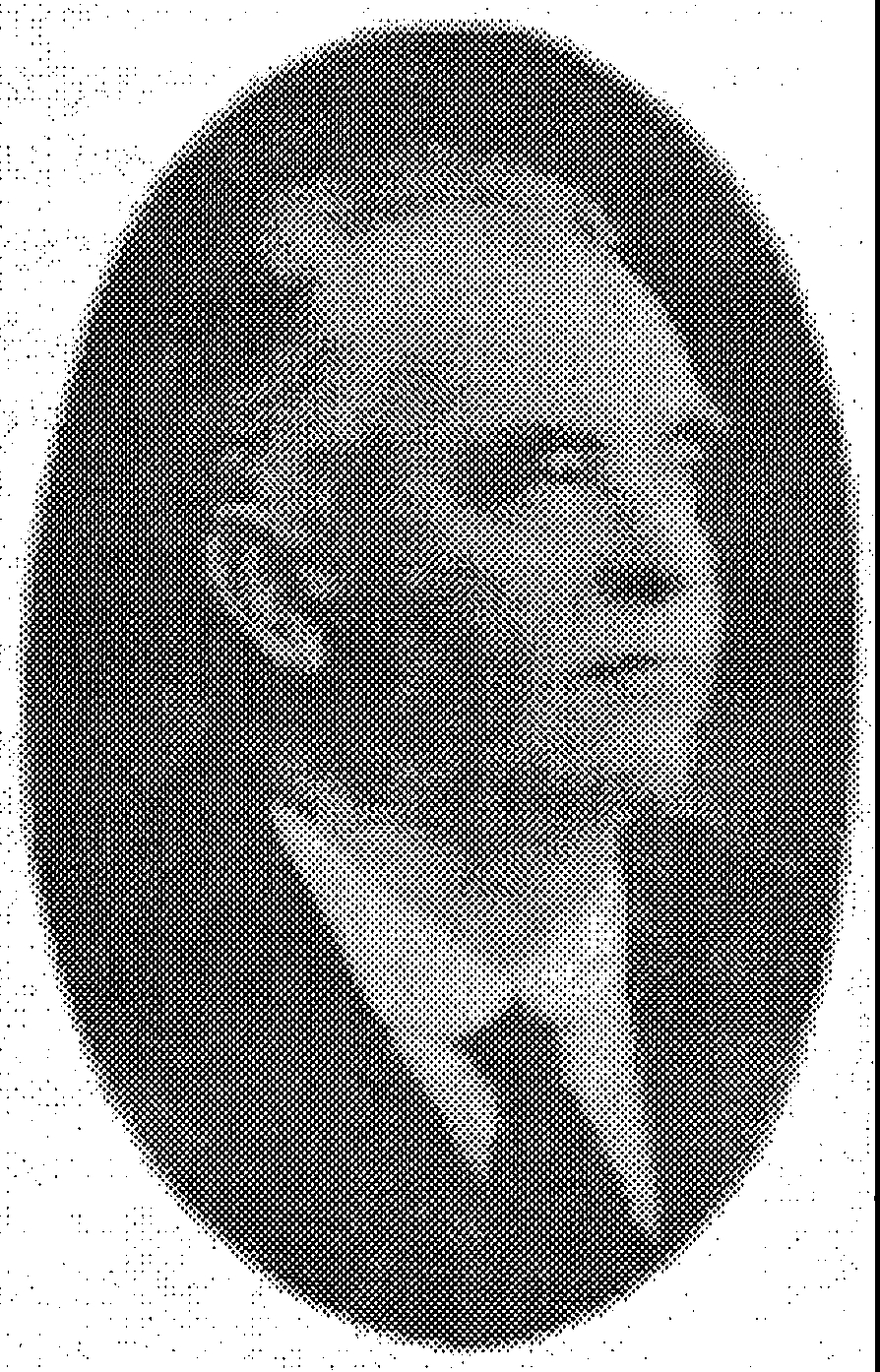
John Lutey

John Thomas Lutey (18 December 1876 – 22 June 1932) was the Labor Party member for the Western Australian Legislative Assemblyrepresenting the seat of Brownhill-Ivanhoe from 1917 to 1932.

John Lutey was born on 18 December 1876 at Eaglehawk near Bendigo in Victoria. In 1895 he migrated to Western Australia with his brother and sister, working as a gold miner at Kalgoorlie until at least 1904. In 1899, he returned to Victoria for a time, and while there he married Millie Hebbard. In 1907 Lutey was working as a filter pressman, and in 1915 he was a mill hand.

Lutey became active in the trade union movement, and joined the Australian Labor Party. On 19 August 1916, he contested the Legislative Assembly seat of Brownhill-Ivanhoe in a by-election, after the incumbent John Scaddan resigned the seat to contest the seat of Canning in a ministerial by-election. Lutey won Brownhill-Ivanhoe, but Scaddan did not win Canning. Lutey subsequently resigned Brownhill-Ivanhoe on 15 September, not having been sworn in, to allow Scaddan to reclaim the seat.

In May 1917, Lutey unsuccessfully contested for a Western Australian seat in the Australian Senate. Two months later he contested Brownhill-Ivanhoe in a ministerial by-election, this time in opposition to Scaddan, who had joined the National Labor Party. Lutey won the seat, and would hold it until his death on 22 June 1932. From July 1924 until January 1930, he was Chairman of Committees in Philip Collier's government. He's buried in Fremantle Cemetery.
