= 1927 Western Australian state election =

Australian state election

- 26 March 1927

All 50 seats in the Western Australian Legislative Assembly
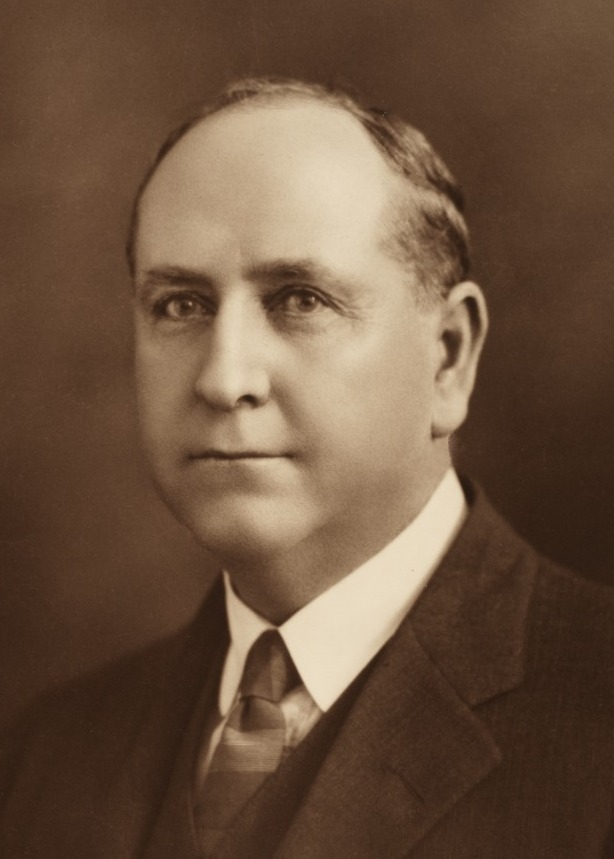

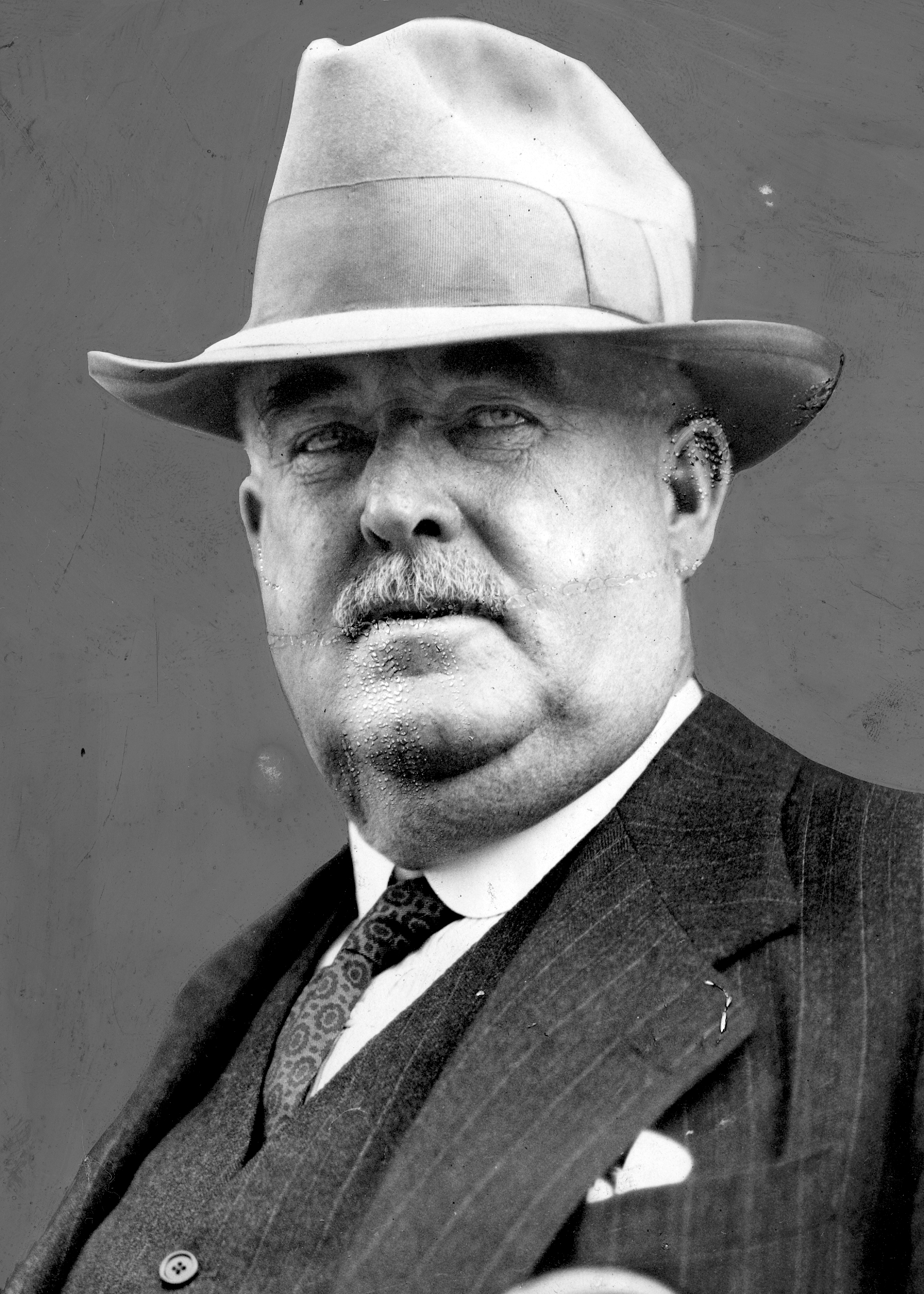
	First party	Second party	Third party
Leader	Philip Collier	James Mitchell	Alec Thomson
Party	Labor	United	Country
Leader since	16 April 1917	17 May 1919	15 December 1923
Leader's seat	Boulder	Northam	Katanning
Last election	27 seats	16 seats	6 seats
Seats won	27 seats	16 seats	7 seats
Seat change	0	0	▲1
Percentage	45.33%	36.85%	15.97%
Swing	▲4.94	▼1.71	▲3.89
Premier before election
Philip Collier
Labor
Elected Premier
Philip Collier
Labor

Elections were held in the state of Western Australia on 26 March 1927 to elect all 50 members to the Legislative Assembly. The incumbent Labor Party government, led by Premier Philip Collier, won a second term in government against the United-Country opposition, led by Opposition Leader James Mitchell.

== Results ==
Western Australian state election, 26 March 1927 Legislative Assembly << 1924–1930 >>
Enrolled voters	194,087^{[1]}				
Votes cast	142,506		Turnout	73.42%	+11.05%
Informal votes	2,000		Informal	1.40%	+0.24%
Summary of votes by party
Party	Primary votes	%	Swing	Seats	Change
Labor	63,687	45.33%	+4.94%	27	± 0
United Party	51,774	36.85%	–1.71%	16	± 0
Country	22,439	15.97%	+3.89%	7	+ 1
Independent	1,803	1.28%	–3.23%	0	± 0
Other	803	0.57%	*	0	± 0
Total	140,506			50	

^{1} 210,949 electors were enrolled to vote at the election, but 9 of the 50 seats were uncontested, with 16,862 electors enrolled in those seats. All 9 of these seats were held by Labor.

- The United Party operated as a combination of the Nationalist Party and the Majority Country Party from the previous election. In 1923, the Country Party had split into Majority and Executive factions.

== See also ==
- Candidates of the 1927 Western Australian state election
- Members of the Western Australian Legislative Assembly, 1924–1927
- Members of the Western Australian Legislative Assembly, 1927–1930
- First Collier Ministry
