= John Scaddan =

Australian politician (1876–1934)

John Scaddan CMG
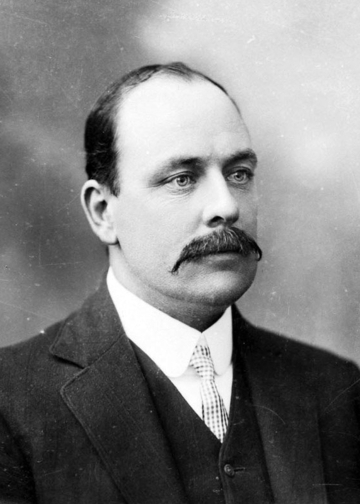

10th Premier of Western Australia
- In office 7 October 1911 – 27 July 1916
- Monarch: George V
- Governor: Sir Gerald Strickland; Sir Harry Barron
- Preceded by: Frank Wilson
- Succeeded by: Frank Wilson

Personal details
- Born: 4 August 1876 Moonta, South Australia, Australia
- Died: 21 November 1934 (aged 58) Perth, Western Australia, Australia
- Party: Labor (1904–1917); National Labor (1917); Nationalist (c. 1917–1920, 1930–1934); Country (1920–1924)
- Spouse(s): Elizabeth Fawkner; Henrietta Edwards
- Profession: Engine driver

John Scaddan, CMG (4 August 1876 – 21 November 1934), popularly known as "Happy Jack", was Premier of Western Australia from 7 October 1911 until 27 July 1916.

== Early life ==
John Scaddan was born in Moonta, South Australia, into a Cornish Australian family. He was educated at the state schools in Woodside and Eaglehawk, Victoria, Australia. From the age of thirteen he worked in the mines at Eaglehawk, while continuing his schooling part-time at the Bendigo School of Mines and Industries. He worked in the area until 1896, when he came to Western Australia, probably as part of the gold rush to the Kalgoorlie goldfields. Scaddan initially worked underground as a miner, but after gaining his engine-driver's certificate, he operated a stationary engine at the pit head. In 1900, Scaddan married Elizabeth Fauckner (or Fawkner) in Boulder, who died from Bright's disease on 21 September 1902, and in 1904 he married Henrietta Edwards.

== Labor politics ==
Scaddan became a keen unionist, and on 28 June 1904 he contested the Western Australian Legislative Assembly seat of Ivanhoe, partly because he was having difficulty securing continuous employment, and partly also because of an interest in economic affairs. He easily won the seat for the Labor Party, but was not invited to be a minister in Henry Daglish's 1904-05 government. This would later be to his advantage, as a number of his rivals within the Labor party suffered from their association with the unsuccessful Daglish ministry.

Scaddan was re-elected unopposed in the election of October 1905, and for the next four years served as party secretary. On the retirement of party leader Thomas Bath in August 1910, Scaddan became leader of the Labor Party, and thus also Leader of the Opposition. In the election of October 1911, Labor campaigned on a wide-ranging and radical platform. Scaddan easily won his seat, which had been renamed Brown Hill-Ivanhoe after a redistribution. The Labor party won an overwhelming majority, and on 7 October 1911 Scaddan became Premier of Western Australia. At just 35 years of age, he remains the youngest ever premier of Western Australia.

=== Premier ===
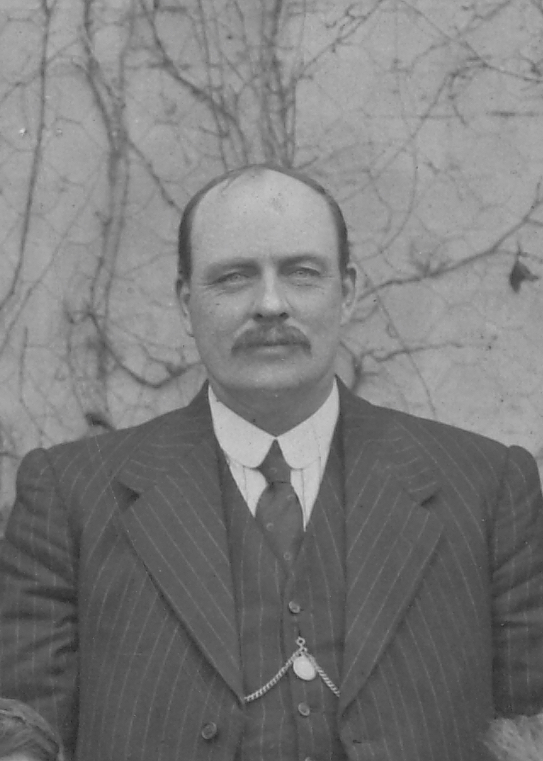
Scaddan at the 1916 Premiers' Conference in Adelaide

Scaddan led a vigorous, radical, reforming government. In 1911, it passed the Workers' Homes Act, which made it easier for lowly paid workers to own their homes. In 1912, the jurisdiction of the Arbitration Court was expanded; Thomas Walker was Minister for Justice and Education, and Attorney General. Workers' compensation provisions were greatly extended. The government also spent heavily on development of the Wheatbelt, especially in the construction of railways. Railway construction was increased, while farmers settling in the eastern wheat belt were provided with assistance in the form of liberalized lending arrangements, technical expertise, and new railways to transport the greatly increased production that took place as a result. Workers were also helped by extensions to the arbitration system. In addition, land taxation was increased, a graduated income tax was introduced, and considerable reforms were carried out in the fields of divorce, criminal law, irrigation, and education.

Scaddan's government is perhaps most remembered for its policy of setting up state owned enterprises, termed state socialism by Scaddan, although it was not really state socialism. Scaddan's government became involved in numerous industries: it established a state shipping service; started a dairy farm at Claremont and a sawmill at Manjimup; reopened a quarry at Boya; set up a brickworks and an agricultural implement works; took over the South Perth ferries and Perth's trams; started up abattoirs; and even purchased hotels.

To help finance its policies, Scaddan's government introduced an income tax in 1912, and this was greatly increased after World War I broke out. It also borrowed heavily, and state debt increased as much in Scaddan's five years as it had in the previous 13 years.

Scaddan's many reforms were achieved despite constant obstruction from the Legislative Council. The government won only a third of all divisions in the Legislative Council, and this is in stark contrast to treatment of the Wilson governments before and after Scaddan's government, who never lost a single bill in the upper house.

Scaddan's government was returned in the election of 1914, but with a majority of only two. This small majority, along with the outbreak of war in 1914 and the onset of one of the worst droughts ever to hit Western Australia, severely restricted Scaddan's policy in his second term. The government's position was made even more unstable when, in January 1915, the Labor MLA for Roebourne, Joseph Gardiner, walked out of Parliament House, and did not return. He subsequently left the state altogether, and in September 1915 his seat was declared vacant for non-attendance. Labor lost the resulting by-election in November, leaving it with exactly half of the seats in parliament. Meanwhile, Bertie Johnston, Labor's only member for a farming seat, had voted with the opposition several times in reaction to Scaddan's failure to fulfill a promise to reduce the price of crown land. Eventually, Johnston resigned from the party and from parliament over the Nevanas affair, and was subsequently re-elected as an independent in January 1916. This left the Labor government with a minority of seats, and in July 1916 the Liberal and Country parties cooperated to defeat the government. Scaddan then asked the Governor Sir Harry Barron for a dissolution of parliament, but was refused. Scaddan resigned as premier on 27 July 1916, and Liberal leader Frank Wilson took office.

Scaddan remained Labor leader after his defeat. On 8 August 1916, he resigned his seat of Brown Hill-Ivanhoe to contest the seat of Canning at a ministerial by-election. He failed to win the seat, but the Labor member who had won Brown Hill-Ivanhoe, John Lutey, resigned it before being sworn in, and Scaddan was re-elected to Brown Hill-Ivanhoe on 7 October 1916.

== Non-Labor politics ==
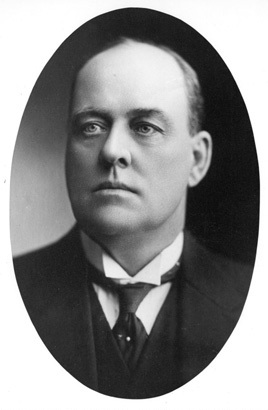
Undated photo

On regaining his seat, Scaddan resumed as Leader of the Opposition. However, the federal Labor Party split in 1916 over the issue of conscription, and it was inevitable that this would eventually affect the Western Australian branch. The federal Labor Party had expelled all supporters of conscription from the party, including Prime Minister Billy Hughes, and Hughes had responded by forming a Nationalist government. As a conscriptionist, Scaddan had supported Hughes. With the May 1917 elections approaching, Scaddan found himself in the untenable position of supporting the non-Labor Prime Minister Hughes instead of the Labor Party leader Frank Tudor. On about 10 April 1917, Scaddan resigned from the Australian Labor Party.

In the meantime, Wilson's government had been having difficulty maintaining parliamentary support. Hughes' Nationalist government had won a landslide victory at the federal level, and Wilson found himself under pressure to form a Nationalist government at the state level. A Nationalist Party was eventually formed, but Wilson was overlooked in favour of Henry Lefroy. Scaddan was appointed Minister for Mines and Railways in Lefroy's Nationalist government on 28 June 1917, but Lutey defeated him in the ministerial by-election. In September 1917, Scaddan contested Albany as the National Labor candidate, but was again defeated.

On 17 May 1919, Scaddan was appointed Colonial Secretary and Minister for Railways in James Mitchell's government, despite not being a member of either house of parliament. Two weeks later he won the Legislative Assembly seat of Albany as a Nationalist. On 25 June 1919, Mitchell reshuffled his government's portfolios, and Scaddan was appointed Minister for Mines, Industries, Forests and Police; and Minister for Railways. He held these portfolios until the general election of March 1924, which he did not contest. He was made a Companion of the Order of St Michael and St George (CMG) in 1923.

Scaddan unsuccessfully contested the seat of Leederville in the general elections of March 1927. He won the seat of Maylands in the election of May 1930, upon which he was appointed Minister for Railways, Mines, Police, Forests and Industry in the Mitchell government. In the April 1933 general elections, Scaddan lost his seat and the Mitchell government was defeated.

== Later life ==
From 1927 on, Scaddan worked as a stock, farm and estate agent. He was a member of the Perth Roads Board from 1926, and its chairman from 1931 to 1934. He died suddenly on 21 November 1934, and was buried at Karrakatta Cemetery.

== Locality names ==
The town of Scaddan located along the Esperance branch railway in the Goldfields–Esperance region of Western Australia is named after John Scaddan.

Political offices
Preceded by Frank Wilson	Premier of Western Australia; 1911–1916	Succeeded by Frank Wilson
Western Australian Legislative Assembly
District created	Member for Ivanhoe; 1904–1911	District abolished
District created	Member for Brown Hill-Ivanhoe; 1911–1916	Succeeded by John Lutey
Preceded by John Lutey	Member for Brown Hill-Ivanhoe; 1916–1917	Succeeded by John Lutey
Preceded by Herbert Robinson	Member for Albany; 1919–1924	Succeeded by Arthur Wansbrough
District created	Member for Maylands; 1930–1933	Succeeded by Robert Clothier
