= Electoral results for the district of Beverley =

Western Australian district election results

This is a list of electoral results for the Electoral district of Beverley in Western Australian state elections.

== Members for Beverley ==
Member	Party	Term
Charles Harper	Ministerial	1890–1901
Charles Harper	Opposition	1901–1904
Charles Harper	Independent	1904–1905
Edmund Smith	Ministerial	1905–1908
John Hopkins	Ministerial	1908–1910
Nat Harper	Ministerial	1910–1911
Frank Broun	Liberal	1911–1914
Charles Wansbrough	Country	1914–1917
Frank Broun	Country	1917–1923
Frank Broun	Country (MCP)	1923–1924
Charles Wansbrough	Country (ECP)	1924–1930
James Mann	Country	1930–1949
James Mann	Independent	1949
James Mann	LCL	1949–1950

== Election results ==
=== Elections in the 1940s ===
1947 Western Australian state election: Beverley
Party	Candidate	Votes	%	±%
Country	James Mann	2,260	76.0	+16.4
Independent	John Wilkinson	713	24.0	+15.8
Total formal votes		2,973	98.3	−0.2
Informal votes		52	1.7	+0.2
Turnout		3,025	84.0	−2.1
Country hold		Swing	N/A	

1943 Western Australian state election: Beverley
Party	Candidate	Votes	%	±%
Country	James Mann	1,816	59.6	−40.4
Independent Labor	Frank Durack	979	32.2	+32.2
Independent Labor	John Wilkinson	250	8.2	+8.2
Total formal votes		3,045	98.5	
Informal votes		47	1.5	
Turnout		3,092	86.1	
Country hold		Swing	N/A	

- Preferences were not distributed.

=== Elections in the 1930s ===
1939 Western Australian state election: Beverley
Party	Candidate	Votes	%	±%
Country	James Mann	unopposed		
Country hold		Swing		

1936 Western Australian state election: Beverley
Party	Candidate	Votes	%	±%
Country	James Mann	1,514	54.6	−8.7
Country	Thomas Retalic	596	21.5	+21.5
Country	George Weaver	384	13.8	+13.8
Independent Country	John O'Dea	281	10.1	+10.1
Total formal votes		2,775	98.9	+0.4
Informal votes		31	1.1	−0.4
Turnout		2,806	72.1	−12.5
Country hold		Swing	N/A	

1933 Western Australian state election: Beverley
Party	Candidate	Votes	%	±%
Country	James Mann	2,164	63.3	+16.6
Country	Charles Wansbrough	1,257	36.7	−0.2
Total formal votes		3,421	98.5	+0.1
Informal votes		52	1.5	−0.1
Turnout		3,473	84.6	+19.0
Country hold		Swing	N/A	

1930 Western Australian state election: Beverley
Party	Candidate	Votes	%	±%
Country	James Mann	1,276	46.7	
Country	Charles Wansbrough	1,008	36.9	
Country	John O'Dea	448	16.4	
Total formal votes		2,732	98.4	
Informal votes		45	1.6	
Turnout		2,777	65.6	
Two-candidate-preferred result
Country	James Mann	1,514	55.4	
Country	Charles Wansbrough	1,218	44.6	
Country hold		Swing		

=== Elections in the 1920s ===
1927 Western Australian state election: Beverley
Party	Candidate	Votes	%	±%
Country	Charles Wansbrough	968	52.8	+11.8
Nationalist	James Mann	866	47.2	+3.0
Total formal votes		1,834	99.2	+0.5
Informal votes		15	0.8	−0.5
Turnout		1,849	72.7	+15.4
Country hold		Swing	+2.1	

1924 Western Australian state election: Beverley
Party	Candidate	Votes	%	±%
Country	James Mann	506	44.2	−55.8
Executive Country	Charles Wansbrough	469	41.0	+41.0
Executive Country	Henry Clemens	170	14.8	+14.8
Total formal votes		1,145	98.7	
Informal votes		15	1.3	
Turnout		1,160	57.3	
Two-party-preferred result
Executive Country	Charles Wansbrough	580	50.7	+50.7
Country	James Mann	565	49.3	−50.7
Executive Country gain from Country		Swing	N/A	

1921 Western Australian state election: Beverley
Party	Candidate	Votes	%	±%
Country	Frank Broun	unopposed		
Country hold		Swing		

=== Elections in the 1910s ===
1917 Western Australian state election: Beverley
Party	Candidate	Votes	%	±%
Nationalist	Frank Broun	548	56.7	+56.7
Country	Henry Stanistreet	418	43.3	–17.1
Total formal votes		966	99.7	+1.0
Informal votes		3	0.3	–1.0
Turnout		969	50.6	–6.3
Nationalist gain from Country		Swing	+56.7	

1914 Western Australian state election: Beverley
Party	Candidate	Votes	%	±%
Country	Charles Wansbrough	809	60.4	+60.4
Labor	Charles Kirkwood	289	21.6	+8.2
Liberal	Richard White	242	18.1	−35.5
Total formal votes		1,340	98.7	+0.1
Informal votes		17	1.3	−0.1
Turnout		1,357	56.9	−11.5
Country gain from Liberal		Swing	N/A	

1911 Western Australian state election: Beverley
Party	Candidate	Votes	%	±%
Ministerialist	Frank Broun	617	53.6	
Labor	Charles Kirkwood	343	29.8	
Ministerialist	Frank Broun	99	8.6	
Ministerialist	Edward Powell	92	8.0	
Total formal votes		1,151	98.6	
Informal votes		16	1.4	
Turnout		1,167	68.4	
Ministerialist hold		Swing		

- Preferences were not distributed.

1910 Beverley state by-election
Party	Candidate	Votes	%	±%
Ministerialist	Nat Harper	574	44.8	
Ministerialist	Walter James	492	38.4	
Ministerialist	Charles Naylor	216	16.8	
Total formal votes		1,282	98.5	+1.1
Informal votes		20	1.5	−1.1
Turnout		1,302	48.6	−9.3
Two-candidate-preferred result
Ministerialist	Nat Harper	663	53.7	
Ministerialist	Walter James	571	46.3	
Ministerialist hold		Swing		

=== Elections in the 1900s ===
1908 Western Australian state election: Beverley
Party	Candidate	Votes	%	±%
Ministerialist	John Hopkins	501	32.3	+32.3
Ministerialist	Edmund Smith	431	27.7	−16.6
Ministerialist	George Ricks	297	19.1	−5.9
Labour	Patrick Whiteley	166	10.7	+10.7
Ministerialist	Edmund Lennard	132	8.5	+8.5
Ministerialist	James Martin	14	0.9	+0.9
Ministerialist	Richard Smith	12	0.8	+0.8
Total formal votes		1,553	97.4	−1.9
Informal votes		42	2.6	+1.9
Turnout		1,595	57.9	+6.4
Two-candidate-preferred result
Ministerialist	John Hopkins	677	50.7	
Ministerialist	Edmund Smith	659	49.3	
Ministerialist hold		Swing	N/A	

1905 Western Australian state election: Beverley
Party	Candidate	Votes	%	±%
Ministerialist	Edmund Smith	325	44.3	+44.3
Ministerialist	George Ricks	183	25.0	+25.0
Ministerialist	Francis McDonald	179	24.4	+24.4
Ministerialist	Hugh Edmiston	46	6.3	–40.3
Total formal votes		733	99.3	–0.1
Informal votes		5	0.7	+0.1
Turnout		738	51.5	+4.4
Ministerialist gain from Independent		Swing	N/A	

1904 Western Australian state election: Beverley
Party	Candidate	Votes	%	±%
Independent	Charles Harper	376	53.4	+0.4
Ministerialist	Hugh Edmiston	328	46.6	–0.4
Total formal votes		704	99.4	+1.5
Informal votes		4	0.6	–1.5
Turnout		708	47.1	–10.5
Independent hold		Swing	–0.4	

1901 Western Australian state election: Beverley
Party	Candidate	Votes	%	±%
Ministerialist	Charles Harper	151	53.0	–10.4
Ministerialist	Hugh Edmiston	134	47.0	+47.0
Total formal votes		285	97.9	+1.3
Informal votes		6	2.1	–1.3
Turnout		291	57.6	+3.0
Ministerialist hold		Swing	N/A	

=== Elections in the 1890s ===
1897 Western Australian colonial election: Beverley
Party	Candidate	Votes	%	±%
Ministerialist	Charles Harper	90	63.4	
Opposition	James Dempster	52	36.6	
Total formal votes		142	96.6	
Informal votes		5	3.4	
Turnout		147	54.7	
Ministerialist hold		Swing		

1894 Western Australian colonial election: Beverley
Party	Candidate	Votes	%	±%
None	Charles Harper	85	50.6	–49.4
None	James Dempster	83	49.4	+49.4

1890 Western Australian colonial election: Beverley
Party	Candidate	Votes	%	±%
None	Charles Harper	unopposed		
