= Results of the 1924 Western Australian state election (Legislative Assembly) =

Western Australian state election, 22 March 1924 Legislative Assembly << 1921–1927 >>
Enrolled voters	159,356^{[1]}				
Votes cast	99,391		Turnout	62.37%	–4.97%
Informal votes	1,151		Informal	1.16%	–0.48%
Summary of votes by party
Party	Primary votes	%	Swing	Seats	Change
Labor	39,679	40.39%	+3.58%	27	+ 10
Nationalist	25,282	25.73%	–2.00%	9	– 1
Majority Country	12,600	12.83%	–4.95%	7	– 9
Executive Country	11,872	12.08%	*	6	+ 6
National Labor	3,846	3.91%	–6.16%	1	– 3
Independent	4,426	4.51%	–3.09%	0	– 3
Other	535	0.54%	*	0	± 0
Total	98,240			50	

This is a list of electoral district results of the 1924 Western Australian election.

== Results by electoral district ==
=== Albany ===
1924 Western Australian state election: Albany
Party	Candidate	Votes	%	±%
Nationalist	Robert Robinson	1,035	35.4	+35.4
Labor	Washington Mather	648	22.2	−20.8
Labor	Arthur Wansbrough	644	22.1	+22.1
Independent	William Redman	211	7.2	+7.2
Country	Percy Lambert	201	6.9	−50.2
Country	Cuthbert McKenzie	182	6.2	+6.2
Total formal votes		2,921	97.9	−1.2
Informal votes		63	2.1	+1.2
Turnout		2,984	64.6	−1.6
Two-party-preferred result
Labor	Arthur Wansbrough	1,501	51.4	+8.5
Nationalist	Robert Robinson	1,420	48.6	+48.6
Labor gain from Country		Swing	+8.5	

=== Avon ===
1924 Western Australian state election: Avon
Party	Candidate	Votes	%	±%
Labor	Patrick Coffey	1,199	44.9	−0.6
Executive Country	Harry Griffiths	657	24.6	+24.6
Country	Tom Harrison	504	18.9	−30.6
Executive Country	Tom Bolton	311	11.6	+11.6
Total formal votes		2,671	98.3	+0.2
Informal votes		46	1.7	−0.2
Turnout		2,717	61.0	+4.3
Two-party-preferred result
Executive Country	Harry Griffiths	1,350	50.5	+50.5
Labor	Patrick Coffey	1,321	49.5	+2.2
Executive Country gain from Country		Swing	N/A	

=== Beverley ===
1924 Western Australian state election: Beverley
Party	Candidate	Votes	%	±%
Country	James Mann	506	44.2	−55.8
Executive Country	Charles Wansbrough	469	41.0	+41.0
Executive Country	Henry Clemens	170	14.8	+14.8
Total formal votes		1,145	98.7	
Informal votes		15	1.3	
Turnout		1,160	57.3	
Two-party-preferred result
Executive Country	Charles Wansbrough	580	50.7	+50.7
Country	James Mann	565	49.3	−50.7
Executive Country gain from Country		Swing	N/A	

=== Boulder ===
1924 Western Australian state election: Boulder
Party	Candidate	Votes	%	±%
Labor	Philip Collier	unopposed		
Labor hold		Swing		

=== Brownhill-Ivanhoe ===
1924 Western Australian state election: Brownhill-Ivanhoe
Party	Candidate	Votes	%	±%
Labor	John Lutey	1,318	74.6	+17.9
National Labor	George Holmes	259	14.7	−28.6
Ind. Nationalist	Elliot Brown	190	10.8	+10.8
Total formal votes		1,767	98.4	−0.9
Informal votes		29	1.6	+0.9
Turnout		1,796	66.8	−9.6
Labor hold		Swing	N/A	

=== Bunbury ===
1924 Western Australian state election: Bunbury
Party	Candidate	Votes	%	±%
Labor	Frederick Withers	1,251	46.8	−2.4
Nationalist	Griffin Money	1,021	38.2	−12.6
Ind. Nationalist	Hannah Thomas	399	14.9	+14.9
Total formal votes		2,671	98.4	−1.1
Informal votes		44	1.6	+1.1
Turnout		2,715	74.2	+6.0
Two-party-preferred result
Labor	Frederick Withers	1,346	50.4	+1.2
Nationalist	Griffin Money	1,325	49.6	−1.2
Labor gain from Nationalist		Swing	+1.2	

=== Canning ===
1924 Western Australian state election: Canning
Party	Candidate	Votes	%	±%
Labor	Alec Clydesdale	3,976	69.8	+21.9
Nationalist	Peter Wedd	1,719	30.2	−8.1
Total formal votes		5,695	99.3	+1.3
Informal votes		41	0.7	−1.3
Turnout		5,736	49.7	−20.0
Labor hold		Swing	+14.9	

=== Claremont ===
1924 Western Australian state election: Claremont
Party	Candidate	Votes	%	±%
Labor	George Dennis	2,086	36.6	+15.0
Nationalist	Charles North	1,933	33.9	+3.8
Ind. Nationalist	John Thomson	1,686	29.5	+29.5
Total formal votes		5,705	98.6	+0.6
Informal votes		78	1.4	−0.6
Turnout		5,783	68.0	−10.4
Two-party-preferred result
Nationalist	Charles North	3,356	58.8	+2.4
Labor	George Dennis	2,349	41.2	−2.4
Nationalist hold		Swing	+2.4	

=== Collie ===
1924 Western Australian state election: Collie
Party	Candidate	Votes	%	±%
Labor	Arthur Wilson	unopposed		
Labor hold		Swing		

=== Coolgardie ===
1924 Western Australian state election: Coolgardie
Party	Candidate	Votes	%	±%
Labor	George Lambert	unopposed		
Labor hold		Swing		

=== Cue ===
1924 Western Australian state election: Cue
Party	Candidate	Votes	%	±%
Labor	Thomas Chesson	unopposed		
Labor hold		Swing		

=== East Perth ===
1924 Western Australian state election: East Perth
Party	Candidate	Votes	%	±%
Labor	Thomas Hughes	2,528	54.9	+7.1
Nationalist	Jack Simons	1,335	29.0	+10.0
Nationalist	Thomas Ferguson	746	16.2	0.0
Total formal votes		4,609	98.8	+0.8
Informal votes		54	1.2	−0.8
Turnout		4,663	61.3	−9.2
Labor hold		Swing	N/A	

=== Forrest ===
1924 Western Australian state election: Forrest
Party	Candidate	Votes	%	±%
Labor	John Holman	unopposed		
Labor hold		Swing		

=== Fremantle ===
1924 Western Australian state election: Fremantle
Party	Candidate	Votes	%	±%
Labor	Joseph Sleeman	1,601	57.9	+12.8
Nationalist	Frank Gibson	1,164	42.1	+6.1
Total formal votes		2,765	98.4	+1.2
Informal votes		44	1.6	−1.2
Turnout		2,809	63.8	−12.8
Labor gain from Nationalist		Swing	+11.6	

=== Gascoyne ===
1924 Western Australian state election: Gascoyne
Party	Candidate	Votes	%	±%
Country	Edward Angelo	490	55.6	−5.1
Labor	William Willesee	391	44.4	+17.9
Total formal votes		881	99.3	+0.3
Informal votes		6	0.7	−0.3
Turnout		887	68.2	+7.3
Country hold		Swing	N/A	

=== Geraldton ===
1924 Western Australian state election: Geraldton
Party	Candidate	Votes	%	±%
Labor	John Willcock	unopposed		
Labor hold		Swing		

=== Greenough ===
1924 Western Australian state election: Greenough
Party	Candidate	Votes	%	±%
Labor	Maurice Kennedy	861	44.1	+6.0
Country	Henry Maley	705	36.1	−25.8
Executive Country	William Patrick	387	19.8	+19.8
Total formal votes		1,953	99.1	−0.3
Informal votes		17	0.9	+0.3
Turnout		1,970	67.1	−2.3
Two-party-preferred result
Labor	Maurice Kennedy	989	50.6	+12.5
Country	Henry Maley	964	49.4	−12.5
Labor gain from Country		Swing	+12.5	

=== Guildford ===
1924 Western Australian state election: Guildford
Party	Candidate	Votes	%	±%
Labor	William Johnson	3,552	55.8	+9.8
National Labor	Joseph Davies	2,814	44.2	−5.0
Total formal votes		6,366	99.5	+1.3
Informal votes		32	0.5	−1.3
Turnout		6,398	71.2	+1.3
Labor gain from National Labor		Swing	+8.7	

=== Hannans ===
1924 Western Australian state election: Hannans
Party	Candidate	Votes	%	±%
Labor	Selby Munsie	unopposed		
Labor hold		Swing		

=== Irwin ===
1924 Western Australian state election: Irwin
Party	Candidate	Votes	%	±%
Country	Charles Maley	796	45.6	+17.3
Executive Country	John Stratton	534	30.6	+30.6
Country	William Mitchell	355	20.3	−7.3
Executive Country	George Matthews	62	3.5	+3.5
Total formal votes		1,747	98.2	+1.8
Informal votes		32	1.8	−1.8
Turnout		1,779	60.0	+12.3
Two-candidate-preferred result
Country	Charles Maley	1,071	61.3	+8.2
Executive Country	John Stratton	676	38.7	+38.7
Country hold		Swing	N/A	

=== Kalgoorlie ===
1924 Western Australian state election: Kalgoorlie
Party	Candidate	Votes	%	±%
Labor	James Cunningham	1,805	62.7	+16.5
Ind. Nationalist	Henry Raven	839	29.2	+29.2
National Labor	Charles Elliott	234	8.1	+3.2
Total formal votes		2,878	99.6	+0.3
Informal votes		11	0.4	−0.3
Turnout		2,889	64.8	−10.9
Labor hold		Swing	N/A	

=== Kanowna ===
1924 Western Australian state election: Kanowna
Party	Candidate	Votes	%	±%
Labor	Thomas Walker	700	72.3	+9.0
Executive Country	Neville Heenan	174	18.0	+18.0
Nationalist	Charles Dempster	94	9.7	−27.0
Total formal votes		700	98.6	−1.1
Informal votes		14	1.4	+1.1
Turnout		982	69.3	+9.3
Labor hold		Swing	N/A	

=== Katanning ===
1924 Western Australian state election: Katanning
Party	Candidate	Votes	%	±%
Executive Country	Alexander Thomson	1,634	65.2	+65.2
Country	George McLeod	873	34.8	−39.8
Total formal votes		2,507	99.4	−0.2
Informal votes		16	0.6	+0.2
Turnout		2,523	64.1	+9.1
Executive Country gain from Country		Swing	N/A	

=== Kimberley ===
1924 Western Australian state election: Kimberley
Party	Candidate	Votes	%	±%
Labor	Aubrey Coverley	234	33.5	+0.2
Nationalist	George Foley	174	24.9	+24.9
Ind. Nationalist	Ancell Gregory	155	22.2	+22.2
Ind. Nationalist	William Chalmers	104	14.9	+14.9
Independent	Walter Brown	32	4.6	+4.6
Total formal votes		699	98.3	−1.0
Informal votes		12	1.7	+1.0
Turnout		711	67.5	+2.3
Two-party-preferred result
Labor	Aubrey Coverley	404	57.8	
Nationalist	George Foley	295	42.2	
Labor gain from Country		Swing	N/A	

=== Leederville ===
1924 Western Australian state election: Leederville
Party	Candidate	Votes	%	±%
Labor	Harry Millington	3,177	53.2	+16.5
Nationalist	Lionel Carter	2,793	46.8	+20.8
Total formal votes		5,970	99.3	+2.1
Informal votes		42	0.7	−2.1
Turnout		6,012	57.7	−4.6
Labor gain from Nationalist		Swing	+10.1	

=== Menzies ===
1924 Western Australian state election: Menzies
Party	Candidate	Votes	%	±%
Labor	Alexander Panton	254	60.3	+12.3
National Labor	John Mullany	167	39.7	−12.3
Total formal votes		421	99.8	+0.8
Informal votes		1	0.2	−0.8
Turnout		422	87.4	+8.0
Labor gain from National Labor		Swing	+12.3	

=== Moore ===
1924 Western Australian state election: Moore
Party	Candidate	Votes	%	±%
Country	James Denton	911	53.1	+6.2
Executive Country	Victor Spencer	388	22.6	+0.9
Executive Country	Alexander Stone	172	10.0	+10.0
Independent	George Welch	139	8.1	+8.1
Executive Country	James Jones	105	6.1	+6.1
Total formal votes		1,715	97.7	+0.4
Informal votes		41	2.3	−0.4
Turnout		1,756	54.0	+8.1
Country hold		Swing	N/A	

=== Mount Leonora ===
1924 Western Australian state election: Mount Leonora
Party	Candidate	Votes	%	±%
Labor	Thomas Heron	408	73.3	+15.4
Independent	George Wilson	149	26.7	+26.7
Total formal votes		557	97.7	−1.7
Informal votes		13	2.3	+1.7
Turnout		570	73.0	−6.2
Labor hold		Swing	N/A	

=== Mount Magnet ===
1924 Western Australian state election: Mount Magnet
Party	Candidate	Votes	%	±%
Labor	Michael Troy	unopposed		
Labor hold		Swing		

=== Mount Margaret ===
1924 Western Australian state election: Mount Margaret
Party	Candidate	Votes	%	±%
National Labor	George Taylor	207	54.9	−45.1
Labor	Patrick Maher	170	45.1	+45.1
Total formal votes		377	99.7	
Informal votes		1	0.3	
Turnout		378	75.0	
National Labor hold		Swing	N/A	

=== Murchison ===
1924 Western Australian state election: Murchison
Party	Candidate	Votes	%	±%
Labor	William Marshall	unopposed		
Labor hold		Swing		

=== Murray-Wellington ===
1924 Western Australian state election: Murray-Wellington
Party	Candidate	Votes	%	±%
Nationalist	William George	1,138	45.8	−10.5
Labor	Thomas Butler	1,100	44.3	+44.3
Executive Country	Hugh MacDonald	244	9.8	+9.8
Total formal votes		2,482	98.0	−0.4
Informal votes		50	2.0	+0.4
Turnout		2,532	63.7	+3.7
Two-party-preferred result
Nationalist	William George	1,266	51.0	
Labor	Thomas Butler	1,216	49.0	
Nationalist hold		Swing	N/A	

=== Nelson ===
1924 Western Australian state election: Nelson
Party	Candidate	Votes	%	±%
Country	John Smith	1,322	51.6	+16.5
Labor	Thomas Anthony	986	38.5	+14.3
Ind. Nationalist	Edwin Ellis	144	5.6	+5.6
Independent	Thomas Ladhams	112	4.4	+4.4
Total formal votes		2,564	98.6	+0.8
Informal votes		35	1.4	−0.8
Turnout		2,599	59.5	−3.6
Country gain from Independent Country		Swing	N/A	

=== North Perth ===
1924 Western Australian state election: North Perth
Party	Candidate	Votes	%	±%
Nationalist	James Smith	1,986	47.0	−10.5
Labor	Frank Darcey	1,707	40.4	−2.1
Independent	Richard White	535	12.6	+12.6
Total formal votes		4,228	98.8	+0.2
Informal votes		53	1.2	−0.2
Turnout		4,281	56.5	−7.5
Two-party-preferred result
Nationalist	James Smith	2,265	53.6	−3.9
Labor	Frank Darcey	1,963	46.4	+3.9
Nationalist hold		Swing	−3.9	

=== North-East Fremantle ===
1924 Western Australian state election: North-East Fremantle
Party	Candidate	Votes	%	±%
Labor	William Angwin	unopposed		
Labor hold		Swing		

=== Northam ===
1924 Western Australian state election: Northam
Party	Candidate	Votes	%	±%
Nationalist	James Mitchell	1,296	53.0	−5.1
Labor	Louis Grieve	1,149	47.0	+5.1
Total formal votes		2,445	99.2	0.0
Informal votes		20	0.8	0.0
Turnout		2,465	75.5	+2.3
Nationalist hold		Swing	−5.1	

=== Perth ===
1924 Western Australian state election: Perth
Party	Candidate	Votes	%	±%
Nationalist	Harry Mann	1,395	52.0	+2.3
Labor	Richard Lane	1,288	48.0	+18.5
Total formal votes		2,683	99.0	+1.9
Informal votes		26	1.0	−1.9
Turnout		2,709	48.2	−14.7
Nationalist hold		Swing	N/A	

=== Pilbara ===
1924 Western Australian state election: Pilbara
Party	Candidate	Votes	%	±%
Labor	Alfred Lamond	195	45.7	+10.1
National Labor	Henry Underwood	165	38.6	+38.6
Executive Country	Arthur Brown	67	15.7	+15.7
Total formal votes		427	95.1	−3.6
Informal votes		22	4.9	+3.6
Turnout		449	56.3	−1.8
Two-party-preferred result
Labor	Alfred Lamond	225	52.7	+17.1
National Labor	Henry Underwood	202	47.3	+47.3
Labor gain from Independent		Swing	N/A	

=== Pingelly ===
1924 Western Australian state election: Pingelly
Party	Candidate	Votes	%	±%
Country	Henry Hickmott	425	29.0	−40.0
Executive Country	Henry Brown	242	16.5	+16.5
Executive Country	Joseph Watson	239	16.3	+16.3
Executive Country	Francis Wake	194	13.2	+13.2
Executive Country	Edwin Corby	157	10.7	+10.7
Executive Country	William Vinicombe	134	9.1	+9.1
Executive Country	Johnson Kennard	76	5.2	+5.2
Total formal votes		1,467	97.7	−0.5
Informal votes		34	2.3	+0.5
Turnout		1,501	56.8	+4.1
Two-candidate-preferred result
Executive Country	Henry Brown	846	57.7	
Country	Henry Hickmott	621	42.3	
Executive Country gain from Country		Swing	N/A	

=== Roebourne ===
1924 Western Australian state election: Roebourne
Party	Candidate	Votes	%	±%
Nationalist	Frederick Teesdale	unopposed		
Nationalist hold		Swing		

=== South Fremantle ===
1924 Western Australian state election: South Fremantle
Party	Candidate	Votes	%	±%
Labor	Alick McCallum	unopposed		
Labor hold		Swing		

=== Subiaco ===
1924 Western Australian state election: Subiaco
Party	Candidate	Votes	%	±%
Nationalist	Walter Richardson	2,584	43.5	+18.8
Labor	Ephraim Freedman	1,963	33.0	−1.2
Nationalist	Clifford Sadlier	1,395	23.5	+23.5
Total formal votes		5,942	98.7	+0.2
Informal votes		77	1.3	−0.2
Turnout		6,019	63.8	0.0
Two-party-preferred result
Nationalist	Walter Richardson	3,768	63.4	+63.4
Labor	Ephraim Freedman	2,174	36.6	−2.8
Nationalist gain from National Labor		Swing	N/A	

- Walter Richardson was the sitting member for Subiaco, who changed from the National Labor party to the Nationalists prior to the election.

=== Sussex ===
1924 Western Australian state election: Sussex
Party	Candidate	Votes	%	±%
Nationalist	George Barnard	1,076	41.7	+17.3
Labor	Thomas Lowry	767	29.7	+29.7
Executive Country	William Pickering	739	28.6	+28.6
Total formal votes		2,582	98.6	+0.5
Informal votes		36	1.4	−0.5
Turnout		2,618	69.7	−8.7
Two-party-preferred result
Nationalist	George Barnard	1,496	57.9	+13.5
Labor	Thomas Lowry	1,086	42.1	+42.1
Nationalist gain from Country		Swing	N/A	

=== Swan ===
1924 Western Australian state election: Swan
Party	Candidate	Votes	%	±%
Country	Richard Sampson	1,875	57.9	+27.6
Labor	William Logie	1,362	42.1	+12.1
Total formal votes		3,237	99.2	+1.5
Informal votes		25	0.8	−1.5
Turnout		3,262	69.5	+1.8
Country hold		Swing	−1.0	

=== Toodyay ===
1924 Western Australian state election: Toodyay
Party	Candidate	Votes	%	±%
Country	Alfred Piesse	645	28.6	−31.1
Executive Country	John Lindsay	574	25.4	+25.4
Executive Country	Ignatius Boyle	399	17.7	+17.7
Executive Country	Charles Fraser	346	15.3	+15.3
Nationalist	Robert Gamble	293	13.0	+13.0
Total formal votes		2,257	97.8	+0.1
Informal votes		51	2.2	−0.1
Turnout		2,308	56.4	+6.0
Two-candidate-preferred result
Executive Country	John Lindsay	1,187	52.6	+52.6
Country	Alfred Piesse	1,070	47.4	−12.3
Executive Country gain from Country		Swing	N/A	

=== Wagin ===
1924 Western Australian state election: Wagin
Party	Candidate	Votes	%	±%
Country	Sydney Stubbs	1,110	64.1	−3.5
Executive Country	Norman Harvey	621	35.9	+35.9
Total formal votes		1,731	99.2	+0.3
Informal votes		13	0.8	−0.3
Turnout		1,744	61.3	+3.2
Country hold		Swing	N/A	

=== West Perth ===
1924 Western Australian state election: West Perth
Party	Candidate	Votes	%	±%
Nationalist	Thomas Davy	1,250	34.8	+34.8
Labor	Alexander McDougall	1,233	34.3	+34.3
Nationalist	Edith Cowan	1,108	30.8	−7.5
Total formal votes		3,561	99.2	+0.7
Informal votes		30	0.8	−0.7
Turnout		3,621	64.8	−4.5
Two-party-preferred result
Nationalist	Thomas Davy	2,182	60.8	
Labor	Alexander McDougall	1,409	39.2	
Nationalist hold		Swing	N/A	

=== Williams-Narrogin ===
1924 Western Australian state election: Williams-Narrogin
Party	Candidate	Votes	%	±%
Executive Country	Edward Johnston	1,881	72.4	
Labor	Cyril Longmore	717	27.6	
Total formal votes		2,598	99.6	
Informal votes		9	0.4	
Turnout		2,607	63.0	
Executive Country gain from Country		Swing	N/A	

=== Yilgarn ===
1924 Western Australian state election: Yilgarn
Party	Candidate	Votes	%	±%
Labor	Edwin Corboy	409	58.4	+10.4
Nationalist	Austin Allom	134	19.1	+19.1
Executive Country	Thomas Hamerston	113	16.1	+16.1
Executive Country	Christian Andre	45	6.4	+6.4
Total formal votes		701	99.6	+2.5
Informal votes		3	0.4	−2.5
Turnout		704	76.3	
Labor hold		Swing	N/A	

=== York ===
1924 Western Australian state election: York
Party	Candidate	Votes	%	±%
Country	Charles Latham	1,407	60.7	+6.5
Executive Country	William Burges	910	39.3	−6.5
Total formal votes		2,317	99.4	−0.1
Informal votes		15	0.6	+0.1
Turnout		2,332	64.1	+7.0
Country hold		Swing	+6.5	

== See also ==
- Candidates of the 1924 Western Australian state election
- 1924 Western Australian state election
- Members of the Western Australian Legislative Assembly, 1924–1927
