= Candidates of the 1924 Western Australian state election =

The 1924 Western Australian state election was held on 22 March 1924.

== Retiring Members ==
=== Majority Country ===
- John Scaddan (MLA) Albany
- Frank Broun (MLA) Beverley
- Michael Durack (MLA) Kimberley

== Legislative Assembly ==
Sitting members are shown in bold text. Successful candidates are highlighted in the relevant colour. Where there is possible confusion, an asterisk (*) is also used.

Electorate	Held by	Labor candidate	Nationalist candidate	Country candidate	Executive Country candidate	Other candidates
Albany	Country	Arthur Wansbrough*; Washington Mather	Robert Robinson	Percy Lambert; Cuthbert McKenzie		William Redman (Independent)
Avon	Country	Patrick Coffey		**Tom Harrison**	Harry Griffiths*; Tom Bolton	
Beverley	Country			James Mann	Charles Wansbrough*; Henry Clemens	
Boulder	Labor	**Philip Collier**				
Brown Hill-Ivanhoe	Labor	**John Lutey**				George Holmes (National Labor); Elliot Brown (Ind. Nationalist)
Bunbury	Nationalist	Frederick Withers	**Griffin Money**			Hannah Clarke (Ind. Nationalist)
Canning	Labor	**Alec Clydesdale**	Peter Wedd			
Claremont	Ind. Nationalist	George Dennis	Charles North			**John Thomson** (Ind. Nationalist)
Collie	Labor	**Arthur Wilson**				
Coolgardie	Labor	**George Lambert**				
Cue	Labor	**Thomas Chesson**				
East Perth	Labor	**Thomas Hughes**	Jack Simons; Thomas Ferguson			
Forrest	Labor	**John Holman**				
Fremantle	Nationalist	Joseph Sleeman	**Frank Gibson**			
Gascoyne	Country	William Willesee		**Edward Angelo**		
Geraldton	Labor	**John Willcock**				
Greenough	Country	Maurice Kennedy		**Henry Maley**	William Patrick	
Guildford	National Labor	William Johnson				**Joseph Davies** (National Labor)
Hannans	Labor	**Selby Munsie**				
Irwin	Country			**Charles Maley***; William Mitchell	John Stratton; George Matthews	
Kalgoorlie	Labor	**James Cunningham**				Henry Raven (Ind. Nationalist); Charles Elliott (National Labor)
Kanowna	Labor	**Thomas Walker**	Charles Dempster		Neville Heenan	
Katanning	Executive Country			George McLeod	**Alec Thomson**	
Kimberley	Country	Aubrey Coverley	George Foley			Ancell Gregory (Ind. Nationalist); William Chalmers (Ind. Nationalist); Walter Brown (Independent)
Leederville	Nationalist	Harry Millington	**Lionel Carter**			
Menzies	National Labor	Alexander Panton				**John Mullany** (National Labor)
Moore	Country			**James Denton**	Victor Spencer; Alexander Stone; James Jones	George Welch (Independent)
Mount Leonora	Labor	**Thomas Heron**				George Wilson (Independent)
Mount Magnet	Labor	**Michael Troy**				
Mount Margaret	National Labor	Patrick Maher				**George Taylor** (National Labor)
Murchison	Labor	**William Marshall**				
Murray-Wellington	Nationalist	Thomas Butler	**William George**		Hugh MacDonald	
Nelson	Country	Thomas Anthony		**John Smith**		Edwin Ellis (Ind. Nationalist); Thomas Ladhams (Independent)
North Perth	Nationalist	Frank Darcey	**James Smith**			Richard White (Independent)
North-East Fremantle	Labor	**William Angwin**				
Northam	Nationalist	Louis Grieve	**James Mitchell**			
Perth	Nationalist	Richard Lane	**Harry Mann**			
Pilbara	National Labor	Alfred Lamond			Arthur Brown	**Henry Underwood** (National Labor)
Pingelly	Country			**Henry Hickmott**	Henry Brown*; Joseph Watson; Francis Wake; Edwin Corby; William Vinicombe; Johnson Kennard	
Roebourne	Nationalist		**Frederick Teesdale**			
South Fremantle	Labor	**Alick McCallum**				
Subiaco	Nationalist	Ephraim Freedman	**Walter Richardson***; Clifford Sadlier			
Sussex	Executive Country	Thomas Lowry	George Barnard		**William Pickering**	
Swan	Country	William Logie		**Richard Sampson**		
Toodyay	Country		Robert Gamble	**Alfred Piesse**	John Lindsay*; Ignatius Boyle; Charles Fraser	
Wagin	Country			**Sydney Stubbs**	Norman Harvey	
West Perth	Nationalist	Alexander McDougall	Thomas Davy*; **Edith Cowan**			
Williams-Narrogin	Executive Country	Cyril Longmore			**Edward Johnston**	
Yilgarn	Labor	**Edwin Corboy**	Austin Allom		Thomas Hamerston; Christian Andre	
York	Country			**Charles Latham**	William Burges	

== See also ==
- Members of the Western Australian Legislative Assembly, 1921–1924
- Members of the Western Australian Legislative Assembly, 1924–1927
- Results of the 1924 Western Australian state election (Legislative Assembly)
- 1924 Western Australian state election
