= Results of the 1930 Western Australian state election (Legislative Assembly) =

Western Australian state election, 12 April 1930 Legislative Assembly << 1927–1933 >>
Enrolled voters	186,732^{[1]}				
Votes cast	139,013		Turnout	74.45%	+1.03%
Informal votes	1,579		Informal	1.14%	–0.26%
Summary of votes by party
Party	Primary votes	%	Swing	Seats	Change
Labor	52,824	38.44%	–6.89%	23	– 4
Nationalist	49,726	36.18%	–0.67%	16	± 0
Country	25,792	18.77%	+2.80%	10	+ 3
Independent Country	3,455	2.51%	*	1	+ 1
Independent	5,637	4.11%	+2.83%	0	± 0
Total	137,434			50	

This is a list of electoral district results of the 1930 Western Australian election.

This election occurred after the first redistribution since the 1911 election, so the boundaries were greatly changed.

== Results by electoral district ==
=== Albany ===
1930 Western Australian state election: Albany
Party	Candidate	Votes	%	±%
Labor	Arthur Wansbrough	1,394	46.7	
Country	Leonard Hill	742	24.9	
Independent Country	Alfred Burvill	615	20.6	
Labor	Charles Watkins	235	7.9	
Total formal votes		2,986	98.2	
Informal votes		56	1.8	
Turnout		3,042	75.0	
Two-party-preferred result
Labor	Arthur Wansbrough	1,539	51.5	
Country	Leonard Hill	1,447	48.5	
Labor hold		Swing		

=== Avon ===
1930 Western Australian state election: Avon
Party	Candidate	Votes	%	±%
Country	Harry Griffiths	1,981	63.2	
Labor	James Bermingham	1,153	36.8	
Total formal votes		3,134	99.2	
Informal votes		25	0.8	
Turnout		3,159	74.5	
Country hold		Swing		

=== Beverley ===
1930 Western Australian state election: Beverley
Party	Candidate	Votes	%	±%
Country	James Mann	1,276	46.7	
Country	Charles Wansbrough	1,008	36.9	
Country	John O'Dea	448	16.4	
Total formal votes		2,732	98.4	
Informal votes		45	1.6	
Turnout		2,777	65.6	
Two-candidate-preferred result
Country	James Mann	1,514	55.4	
Country	Charles Wansbrough	1,218	44.6	
Country hold		Swing		

=== Boulder ===
1930 Western Australian state election: Boulder
Party	Candidate	Votes	%	±%
Labor	Philip Collier	unopposed		
Labor hold		Swing		

=== Brownhill-Ivanhoe ===
1930 Western Australian state election: Brownhill-Ivanhoe
Party	Candidate	Votes	%	±%
Labor	John Lutey	unopposed		
Labor hold		Swing		

=== Bunbury ===
1930 Western Australian state election: Bunbury
Party	Candidate	Votes	%	±%
Labor	Frederick Withers	1,950	55.2	
Nationalist	John Hands	1,581	44.8	
Total formal votes		3,531	99.2	
Informal votes		28	0.8	
Turnout		3,559	87.3	
Labor hold		Swing		

=== Canning ===
1930 Western Australian state election: Canning
Party	Candidate	Votes	%	±%
Nationalist	Herbert Wells	2,967	50.8	
Labor	Alexander Clydesdale	2,875	49.2	
Total formal votes		5,842	99.3	
Informal votes		40	0.7	
Turnout		5,882	73.0	
Nationalist gain from Labor		Swing		

=== Claremont ===
1930 Western Australian state election: Claremont
Party	Candidate	Votes	%	±%
Nationalist	Charles North	2,309	59.9	
Independent	Ada Bromham	1,548	40.1	
Total formal votes		3,857	99.2	
Informal votes		31	0.8	
Turnout		3,888	60.2	
Nationalist hold		Swing		

=== Collie ===
1930 Western Australian state election: Collie
Party	Candidate	Votes	%	±%
Labor	Arthur Wilson	unopposed		
Labor hold		Swing		

=== East Perth ===
1930 Western Australian state election: East Perth
Party	Candidate	Votes	%	±%
Labor	James Kenneally	2,580	60.1	
Independent Labor	Thomas Hughes	1,714	39.9	
Total formal votes		4,294	98.6	
Informal votes		60	1.4	
Turnout		4,354	62.0	
Labor hold		Swing		

=== Forrest ===
1930 Western Australian state election: Forrest
Party	Candidate	Votes	%	±%
Labor	May Holman	2,216	65.8	
Country	James Egan	634	18.8	
Nationalist	Frank George	517	15.4	
Total formal votes		3,367	99.3	
Informal votes		23	0.7	
Turnout		3,390	76.0	
Labor hold		Swing		

=== Fremantle ===
1930 Western Australian state election: Fremantle
Party	Candidate	Votes	%	±%
Labor	Joseph Sleeman	unopposed		
Labor hold		Swing		

=== Gascoyne ===
1930 Western Australian state election: Gascoyne
Party	Candidate	Votes	%	±%
Nationalist	Edward Angelo	639	55.3	
Labor	James Hickey	517	44.7	
Total formal votes		1,156	99.2	
Informal votes		9	0.8	
Turnout		1,165	82.5	
Nationalist hold		Swing		

=== Geraldton ===
1930 Western Australian state election: Geraldton
Party	Candidate	Votes	%	±%
Labor	John Willcock	2,072	66.8	
Country	George Houston	1,029	33.2	
Total formal votes		3,101	99.2	
Informal votes		26	0.8	
Turnout		3,127	77.9	
Labor hold		Swing		

=== Greenough ===
1930 Western Australian state election: Greenough
Party	Candidate	Votes	%	±%
Labor	Maurice Kennedy	1,498	38.1	
Country	William Patrick	1,361	34.6	
Independent	Henry Maley	1,076	27.3	
Total formal votes		3,935	99.0	
Informal votes		40	1.0	
Turnout		3,975	68.3	
Two-party-preferred result
Country	William Patrick	2,164	55.0	
Labor	Maurice Kennedy	1,771	45.0	
Country gain from Labor		Swing		

=== Guildford-Midland ===
1930 Western Australian state election: Guildford-Midland
Party	Candidate	Votes	%	±%
Labor	William Johnson	unopposed		
Labor hold		Swing		

=== Hannans ===
1930 Western Australian state election: Hannans
Party	Candidate	Votes	%	±%
Labor	Selby Munsie	unopposed		
Labor hold		Swing		

=== Irwin-Moore ===
1930 Western Australian state election: Irwin-Moore
Party	Candidate	Votes	%	±%
Country	Percy Ferguson	1,483	66.2	
Nationalist	James Denton	759	33.8	
Total formal votes		2,242	98.7	
Informal votes		30	1.3	
Turnout		2,272	64.0	
Country hold		Swing		

=== Kalgoorlie ===
1930 Western Australian state election: Kalgoorlie
Party	Candidate	Votes	%	±%
Labor	James Cunningham	unopposed		
Labor hold		Swing		

=== Kanowna ===
1930 Western Australian state election: Kanowna
Party	Candidate	Votes	%	±%
Labor	Thomas Walker	782	72.9	
Country	Sydney Hayes	291	27.1	
Total formal votes		1,073	99.1	
Informal votes		10	0.9	
Turnout		1,083	59.5	
Labor hold		Swing		

=== Katanning ===
1930 Western Australian state election: Katanning
Party	Candidate	Votes	%	±%
Independent Country	Arnold Piesse	2,536	62.1	
Country	Alec Thomson	1,546	37.9	
Total formal votes		4,082	98.8	
Informal votes		49	1.2	
Turnout		4,131	80.6	
Independent Country gain from Country		Swing		

=== Kimberley ===
1930 Western Australian state election: Kimberley
Party	Candidate	Votes	%	±%
Labor	Aubrey Coverley	439	73.5	
Nationalist	Harold Forbes	158	26.5	
Total formal votes		588	98.7	
Informal votes		8	1.3	
Turnout		604	60.6	
Labor hold		Swing		

=== Leederville ===
1930 Western Australian state election: Leederville
Party	Candidate	Votes	%	±%
Labor	Alexander Panton	3,242	48.4	
Nationalist	George Taylor	1,734	25.9	
Nationalist	Henry Simper	1,056	15.8	
Nationalist	Charles Hammond	665	9.9	
Total formal votes		6,697	98.7	
Informal votes		86	1.3	
Turnout		6,783	71.8	
After distribution of preferences
Labor	Alexander Panton	3,379	50.4	
Nationalist	George Taylor	2,015	30.1	
Nationalist	Henry Simper	1,304	19.5	
Labor hold		Swing		

=== Maylands ===
1930 Western Australian state election: Maylands
Party	Candidate	Votes	%	±%
Labor	Ernest Barker	2,211	41.7	
Nationalist	John Scaddan	1,681	31.7	
Nationalist	Arthur Daley	1,269	23.9	
Nationalist	Peter Wedd	144	2.7	
Total formal votes		5,305	98.9	
Informal votes		60	1.1	
Turnout		5,365	79.3	
Two-party-preferred result
Nationalist	John Scaddan	2,879	54.3	
Labor	Ernest Barker	2,426	45.7	
Nationalist hold		Swing		

=== Middle Swan ===
1930 Western Australian state election: Middle Swan
Party	Candidate	Votes	%	±%
Labor	James Hegney	2,263	47.5	
Nationalist	Dick Ardagh	1,076	22.6	
Nationalist	Albert McGilvray	791	16.6	
Country	Alfred Yeates	638	13.4	
Total formal votes		4,683	98.2	
Informal votes		85	1.8	
Turnout		4,853	70.4	
Two-party-preferred result
Labor	James Hegney	2,532	53.1	
Nationalist	Dick Ardagh	2,236	46.9	
Labor hold		Swing		

=== Mount Hawthorn ===
1930 Western Australian state election: Mount Hawthorn
Party	Candidate	Votes	%	±%
Labor	Harry Millington	2,002	53.5	
Nationalist	Peter Menzies	1,739	46.5	
Total formal votes		3,741	98.7	
Informal votes		48	1.3	
Turnout		3,789	77.3	
Labor hold		Swing		

=== Mount Magnet ===
1930 Western Australian state election: Mount Magnet
Party	Candidate	Votes	%	±%
Labor	Michael Troy	929	58.9	
Labor	Peter Cowan	648	41.1	
Total formal votes		1,577	99.2	
Informal votes		12	0.8	
Turnout		1,589	79.1	
Labor hold		Swing		

=== Mount Marshall ===
1930 Western Australian state election: Mount Marshall
Party	Candidate	Votes	%	±%
Country	John Lindsay	2,356	72.0	
Labor	John Mulqueeny	915	28.0	
Total formal votes		3,271	99.3	
Informal votes		24	0.7	
Turnout		3,295	67.3	
Country hold		Swing		

=== Murchison ===
1930 Western Australian state election: Murchison
Party	Candidate	Votes	%	±%
Labor	William Marshall	unopposed		
Labor hold		Swing		

=== Murray-Wellington ===
1930 Western Australian state election: Murray-Wellington
Party	Candidate	Votes	%	±%
Labor	John Tonkin	1,039	32.4	
Nationalist	Ross McLarty	929	29.0	
Nationalist	Hobart Tuckey	599	18.7	
Country	Francis Becher	407	12.7	
Nationalist	Charles Heppingstone	229	7.2	
Total formal votes		3,203	98.0	
Informal votes		65	2.0	
Turnout		3,268	84.3	
Two-party-preferred result
Nationalist	Ross McLarty	2,003	62.5	
Labor	John Tonkin	1,200	37.5	
Nationalist hold		Swing		

=== Nedlands ===
1930 Western Australian state election: Nedlands
Party	Candidate	Votes	%	±%
Labor	John Leonard	2,198	36.3	
Nationalist	Norbert Keenan	1,392	23.0	
Nationalist	Clifford Sadlier	1,150	19.0	
Nationalist	Isaac Foristal	741	12.2	
Nationalist	Thomas Molloy	245	4.1	
Nationalist	Adolphus Terelinck	232	3.8	
Independent	John Attey	99	1.6	
Total formal votes		6,057	98.1	
Informal votes		117	1.9	
Turnout		6,174	82.4	
Two-party-preferred result
Nationalist	Norbert Keenan	3,387	55.9	
Labor	John Leonard	2,670	44.1	
Nationalist hold		Swing		

=== Nelson ===
1930 Western Australian state election: Nelson
Party	Candidate	Votes	%	±%
Nationalist	John Smith	2,716	66.7	
Labor	Walter Toyer	1,358	33.3	
Total formal votes		4,037	99.1	
Informal votes		37	0.9	
Turnout		4,111	81.7	
Nationalist hold		Swing		

=== North Perth ===
1930 Western Australian state election: North Perth
Party	Candidate	Votes	%	±%
Nationalist	James Smith	2,594	63.0	
Nationalist	Thomas Langley	1,521	37.0	
Total formal votes		4,115	98.8	
Informal votes		49	1.2	
Turnout		4,164	68.4	
Nationalist hold		Swing		

=== North-East Fremantle ===
1930 Western Australian state election: North-East Fremantle
Party	Candidate	Votes	%	±%
Nationalist	Hubert Parker	2,554	50.1	
Labor	Francis Rowe	2,541	49.9	
Total formal votes		5,095	99.2	
Informal votes		39	0.8	
Turnout		5,134	68.9	
Nationalist gain from Labor		Swing		

=== Northam ===
1930 Western Australian state election: Northam
Party	Candidate	Votes	%	±%
Nationalist	James Mitchell	1,982	53.4	
Labor	Patrick Coffey	1,726	46.6	
Total formal votes		3,708	99.2	
Informal votes		31	0.8	
Turnout		3,739	81.0	
Nationalist hold		Swing		

=== Perth ===
1930 Western Australian state election: Perth
Party	Candidate	Votes	%	±%
Nationalist	Harry Mann	2,991	53.1	
Labor	Ted Needham	2,591	46.1	
Independent	John McCoo	45	0.8	
Total formal votes		5,627	98.5	
Informal votes		86	1.5	
Turnout		5,713	72.5	
Nationalist hold		Swing		

=== Pilbara ===
1930 Western Australian state election: Pilbara
Party	Candidate	Votes	%	±%
Labor	Alfred Lamond	229	54.3	
Nationalist	Edward Greene	166	39.3	
Independent	William Maher	27	6.4	
Total formal votes		422	99.3	
Informal votes		3	0.7	
Turnout		425	84.2	
Labor hold		Swing		

=== Pingelly ===
1930 Western Australian state election: Pingelly
Party	Candidate	Votes	%	±%
Country	Henry Brown	1,142	38.7	
Country	Harrie Seward	1,136	38.5	
Labor	William Carmody	671	22.8	
Total formal votes		2,949	97.7	
Informal votes		69	2.3	
Turnout		3,018	73.8	
Two-candidate-preferred result
Country	Henry Brown	1,526	51.7	
Country	Harrie Seward	1,423	48.3	
Country hold		Swing		

=== Roebourne ===
1930 Western Australian state election: Roebourne
Party	Candidate	Votes	%	±%
Nationalist	Frederick Teesdale	317	70.1	
Labor	Arthur Orr	135	29.9	
Total formal votes		452	99.6	
Informal votes		2	0.4	
Turnout		454	74.2	
Nationalist hold		Swing		

=== South Fremantle ===
1930 Western Australian state election: South Fremantle
Party	Candidate	Votes	%	±%
Labor	Alick McCallum	unopposed		
Labor hold		Swing		

=== Subiaco ===
1930 Western Australian state election: Subiaco
Party	Candidate	Votes	%	±%
Nationalist	Walter Richardson	3,233	58.5	
Labor	Richard Nash	2,290	41.5	
Total formal votes		5,469	99.0	
Informal votes		54	1.0	
Turnout		5,577	78.5	
Nationalist hold		Swing		

=== Sussex ===
1930 Western Australian state election: Sussex
Party	Candidate	Votes	%	±%
Nationalist	George Barnard	1,362	41.3	
Labor	John Close	1,150	34.9	
Nationalist	Benjamin Prowse	784	23.8	
Total formal votes		3,296	99.1	
Informal votes		31	0.9	
Turnout		3,327	89.7	
Two-party-preferred result
Nationalist	George Barnard	2,029	61.6	
Labor	John Close	1,267	38.4	
Nationalist hold		Swing		

=== Swan ===
1930 Western Australian state election: Swan
Party	Candidate	Votes	%	±%
Nationalist	Richard Sampson	unopposed		
Nationalist hold		Swing		

=== Toodyay ===
1930 Western Australian state election: Toodyay
Party	Candidate	Votes	%	±%
Country	Lindsay Thorn	1,026	42.2	
Country	Ignatius Boyle	888	36.5	
Independent Country	James Pollitt	294	12.1	
Nationalist	Richard Fitzgerald	224	9.2	
Total formal votes		2,432	98.7	
Informal votes		32	1.3	
Turnout		2,464	71.7	
Two-candidate-preferred result
Country	Lindsay Thorn	1,313	54.0	
Country	Ignatius Boyle	1,119	46.0	
Country hold		Swing		

=== Victoria Park ===
1930 Western Australian state election: Victoria Park
Party	Candidate	Votes	%	±%
Labor	Howard Raphael	2,757	48.4	
Nationalist	Charles Harper	1,796	31.6	
Independent Labor	Frederick White	1,138	20.0	
Total formal votes		5,691	98.9	
Informal votes		65	1.1	
Turnout		5,756	81.9	
Two-party-preferred result
Labor	Howard Raphael	3,220	56.6	
Nationalist	Charles Harper	2,471	43.4	
Labor hold		Swing		

=== Wagin ===
1930 Western Australian state election: Wagin
Party	Candidate	Votes	%	±%
Country	Sydney Stubbs	2,070	61.8	
Country	Adam Elder	1,281	38.2	
Total formal votes		3,351	99.4	
Informal votes		21	0.6	
Turnout		3,372	72.8	
Country hold		Swing		

=== West Perth ===
1930 Western Australian state election: West Perth
Party	Candidate	Votes	%	±%
Nationalist	Thomas Davy	2,884	55.9	
Labor	Frank Darcey	2,277	44.1	
Total formal votes		5,114	99.1	
Informal votes		47	0.9	
Turnout		5,208	78.1	
Nationalist hold		Swing		

=== Williams-Narrogin ===
1930 Western Australian state election: Williams-Narrogin
Party	Candidate	Votes	%	±%
Country	Victor Doney	1,966	70.4	
Labor	John McKenna	825	29.6	
Total formal votes		2,791	99.5	
Informal votes		14	0.5	
Turnout		2,805	81.2	
Country hold		Swing		

=== Yilgarn-Coolgardie ===
1930 Western Australian state election: Yilgarn-Coolgardie
Party	Candidate	Votes	%	±%
Country	William Price	848	38.5	
Labor	Edwin Corboy	678	30.8	
Labor	George Lambert	674	30.6	
Total formal votes		2,200	99.0	
Informal votes		22	1.0	
Turnout		2,222	79.4	
Two-party-preferred result
Labor	Edwin Corboy	1,262	57.4	
Country	William Price	938	42.6	
Labor hold		Swing		

=== York ===
1930 Western Australian state election: York
Party	Candidate	Votes	%	±%
Country	Charles Latham	unopposed		
Country hold		Swing		

== See also ==
- Candidates of the 1930 Western Australian state election
- 1930 Western Australian state election
- Members of the Western Australian Legislative Assembly, 1930–1933
