= Electoral results for the district of Pingelly =

Western Australian district election results

This is a list of electoral results for the Electoral district of Pingelly in Western Australian state elections.

== Members for Pingelly ==
Member	Party	Term
Nat Harper	Liberal	1911–1914
Henry Hickmott	Country	1914–1923
Henry Hickmott	Country (ECP)	1923–1924
Henry Brown	Country	1924–1933
Harrie Seward	Country	1933–1950

== Election results ==
=== Elections in the 1940s ===
1947 Western Australian state election: Pingelly
Party	Candidate	Votes	%	±%
Country	Harrie Seward	2,108	70.2	+2.4
Independent	Percy Munday	896	29.8	−2.4
Total formal votes		3,004	98.9	+0.2
Informal votes		34	1.1	−0.2
Turnout		3,038	77.6	−2.6
Country hold		Swing	+2.4	

1943 Western Australian state election: Pingelly
Party	Candidate	Votes	%	±%
Country	Harrie Seward	1,970	67.8	−32.2
Independent	Percy Munday	935	32.2	+32.2
Total formal votes		2,905	98.7	
Informal votes		39	1.3	
Turnout		2,944	80.2	
Country hold		Swing	N/A	

=== Elections in the 1930s ===
1939 Western Australian state election: Pingelly
Party	Candidate	Votes	%	±%
Country	Harrie Seward	unopposed		
Country hold		Swing		

1936 Western Australian state election: Pingelly
Party	Candidate	Votes	%	±%
Country	Harrie Seward	1,743	65.7	+20.9
Country	Cecil Elsegood	909	34.3	+34.3
Total formal votes		2,652	99.4	+1.0
Informal votes		15	0.6	−1.0
Turnout		2,667	70.7	−14.7
Country hold		Swing	N/A	

1933 Western Australian state election: Pingelly
Party	Candidate	Votes	%	±%
Country	Harrie Seward	1,510	44.8	+6.3
Independent	Cecil Elsegood	1,115	33.1	+33.1
Labor	Keith Growden	745	22.1	−0.7
Total formal votes		3,370	98.4	+0.7
Informal votes		54	1.6	−0.7
Turnout		3,424	85.4	+11.6
Two-candidate-preferred result
Country	Harrie Seward	1,738	51.6	+3.3
Independent	Cecil Elsegood	1,632	48.4	+48.4
Country hold		Swing	N/A	

1930 Western Australian state election: Pingelly
Party	Candidate	Votes	%	±%
Country	Henry Brown	1,142	38.7	
Country	Harrie Seward	1,136	38.5	
Labor	William Carmody	671	22.8	
Total formal votes		2,949	97.7	
Informal votes		69	2.3	
Turnout		3,018	73.8	
Two-candidate-preferred result
Country	Henry Brown	1,526	51.7	
Country	Harrie Seward	1,423	48.3	
Country hold		Swing		

=== Elections in the 1920s ===
1927 Western Australian state election: Pingelly
Party	Candidate	Votes	%	±%
Country	Henry Brown	1,084	61.4	+44.9
Country	Joseph Watson	402	22.8	+6.5
Nationalist	Joseph Keays	279	15.8	−13.2
Total formal votes		1,765	98.3	+0.6
Informal votes		31	1.7	−0.6
Turnout		1,796	64.4	+7.6
Country hold		Swing	N/A	

- Preferences were not distributed.

1924 Western Australian state election: Pingelly
Party	Candidate	Votes	%	±%
Country	Henry Hickmott	425	29.0	−40.0
Executive Country	Henry Brown	242	16.5	+16.5
Executive Country	Joseph Watson	239	16.3	+16.3
Executive Country	Francis Wake	194	13.2	+13.2
Executive Country	Edwin Corby	157	10.7	+10.7
Executive Country	William Vinicombe	134	9.1	+9.1
Executive Country	Johnson Kennard	76	5.2	+5.2
Total formal votes		1,467	97.7	−0.5
Informal votes		34	2.3	+0.5
Turnout		1,501	56.8	+4.1
Two-candidate-preferred result
Executive Country	Henry Brown	846	57.7	
Country	Henry Hickmott	621	42.3	
Executive Country gain from Country		Swing	N/A	

1921 Western Australian state election: Pingelly
Party	Candidate	Votes	%	±%
Country	Henry Hickmott	816	69.0	−35.7
Country	Harrie Seward	207	17.5	+17.5
Country	Harry Gayfer	159	13.4	+13.4
Total formal votes		1,182	98.2	+1.8
Informal votes		22	1.8	−1.8
Turnout		1,204	52.7	−9.1
Country hold		Swing	N/A	

- Preferences were not distributed.

=== Elections in the 1910s ===
1917 Western Australian state election: Pingelly
Party	Candidate	Votes	%	±%
Nationalist	Richard Johnson	488	34.3	+34.3
National Country	Henry Hickmott	484	33.3	–24.2
National Country	Francis Wake	253	17.8	+17.8
National Country	William Martin	157	11.0	+11.0
National Country	Thomas James	52	3.7	+3.7
Total formal votes		1,424	96.4	–1.5
Informal votes		53	3.6	+1.5
Turnout		1,477	61.8	+4.6
Two-party-preferred result
National Country	Henry Hickmott	825	57.9	+0.4
Nationalist	Richard Johnson	599	42.1	+42.1
National Country hold		Swing	+0.4	

1914 Western Australian state election: Pingelly
Party	Candidate	Votes	%	±%
Country	Henry Hickmott	889	57.5	+57.5
Liberal	Nat Harper	657	42.5	−22.7
Total formal votes		1,546	97.9	−1.2
Informal votes		33	2.1	+1.2
Turnout		1,579	57.2	−15.8
Country gain from Liberal		Swing	N/A	

1911 Western Australian state election: Pingelly
Party	Candidate	Votes	%	±%
Ministerialist	Nat Harper	1,034	65.2	
Labor	Matthew Bodey	552	34.8	
Total formal votes		1,586	99.1	
Informal votes		15	0.9	
Turnout		1,601	73.0	
Ministerialist hold		Swing		
