= Candidates of the 1930 Western Australian state election =

The 1930 Western Australian state election was held on 12 April 1930.

== Retiring Members ==
=== Labor ===
- Thomas Chesson (MLA) (Cue)

=== Nationalist ===
- William George (MLA) (Murray-Wellington)

== Legislative Assembly ==
Sitting members are shown in bold text. Successful candidates are highlighted in the relevant colour. Where there is possible confusion, an asterisk (*) is also used.

Electorate	Held by	Labor candidate	Nationalist candidate	Country candidate	Other candidates
Albany	Labor	**Arthur Wansbrough***; Charles Watkins		Leonard Hill	Alfred Burvill (Ind. Country)
Avon	Country	James Bermingham		**Harry Griffiths**	
Beverley	Country			James Mann*; **Charles Wansbrough**; John O'Dea	
Boulder	Labor	**Philip Collier**			
Brown Hill-Ivanhoe	Labor	**John Lutey**			
Bunbury	Labor	**Frederick Withers**	John Hands		
Canning	Labor	**Alec Clydesdale**	Herbert Wells		
Claremont	Nationalist		**Charles North**		Ada Bromham (Independent)
Collie	Labor	**Arthur Wilson**			
East Perth	Labor	**James Kenneally**			Thomas Hughes (Ind. Labor)
Forrest	Labor	**May Holman**	Frank George	James Egan	
Fremantle	Labor	**Joseph Sleeman**			
Gascoyne	Nationalist	James Hickey	**Edward Angelo**		
Geraldton	Labor	**John Willcock**		George Houston	
Greenough	Labor	**Maurice Kennedy**		William Patrick	Henry Maley (Independent)
Guildford-Midland	Labor	**William Johnson**			
Hannans	Labor	**Selby Munsie**			
Irwin-Moore	Country		James Denton	**Percy Ferguson**	
Kalgoorlie	Labor	**James Cunningham**			
Kanowna	Labor	**Tommy Walker**		Sydney Hayes	
Katanning	Country			**Alec Thomson**	Arnold Piesse (Ind. Country)
Kimberley	Labor	**Aubrey Coverley**	Harold Forbes		
Leederville	Labor	**Alexander Panton**	George Taylor; Henry Simper; Charles Hammond		
Maylands	Nationalist	Ernest Barker	**John Scaddan***; Arthur Daley; Peter Wedd		
Middle Swan	Labor	James Hegney	Dick Ardagh; Albert McGilvray	Alfred Yeates	
Mount Hawthorn	Labor	**Harry Millington**	Peter Menzies		
Mount Magnet	Labor	**Michael Troy***; **Ernest Cowan**			
Mount Marshall	Country	John Mulqueeny		**John Lindsay**	
Murchison	Labor	**William Marshall**			
Murray-Wellington	Nationalist	John Tonkin	Ross McLarty*; Hobart Tuckey; Charles Heppingstone	Francis Becher	
Nedlands	Nationalist	John Leonard	Norbert Keenan*; Clifford Sadlier; Isaac Foristal; Thomas Molloy; Adolphus Terelinck		John Attey (Independent)
Nelson	Nationalist	Walter Toyer	**John Smith**		
North Perth	Nationalist		**James Smith***; Thomas Langley		
North-East Fremantle	Labor	**Francis Rowe**	Hubert Parker		
Northam	Nationalist	Patrick Coffey	**James Mitchell**		
Perth	Nationalist	Ted Needham	**Harry Mann**		John McCoo (Independent)
Pilbara	Labor	**Alfred Lamond**	Edward Greene		William Maher (Independent)
Pingelly	Country	William Carmody		**Henry Brown***; Harrie Seward	
Roebourne	Nationalist	Arthur Orr	**Frederick Teesdale**		
South Fremantle	Labor	**Alick McCallum**			
Subiaco	Nationalist	Richard Nash	**Walter Richardson**		
Sussex	Nationalist	John Close	**George Barnard***; Benjamin Prowse		
Swan	Nationalist		**Richard Sampson**		
Toodyay	Country		Richard Fitzgerald	**John Lindsay***; Ignatius Boyle	James Pollitt (Ind. Country)
Victoria Park	Labor	Howard Raphael	Charles Harper		Frederick White (Ind. Labor)
Wagin	Country			**Sydney Stubbs***; Adam Elder	
West Perth	Nationalist	Frank Darcey	**Thomas Davy**		
Williams-Narrogin	Country	John McKenna		**Victor Doney**	
Yilgarn-Coolgardie	Labor	**Edwin Corboy***; **George Lambert**		William Price	
York	Country			**Charles Latham**	

== See also ==
- Members of the Western Australian Legislative Assembly, 1927–1930
- Members of the Western Australian Legislative Assembly, 1930–1933
- 1930 Western Australian state election
