= Members of the Western Australian Legislative Assembly, 1924–1927 =

This is a list of members of the Western Australian Legislative Assembly between the 1924 election and the 1927 election, together known as the 12th Parliament. During the previous term, the Country Party had split into rival factions, the Ministerial Country Party (MCP) which comprised the bulk of the parliamentary party—many of whom had switched allegiance from other parties since 1919—and the Executive Country Party (ECP), which was loyal to the Primary Producers' Association, which the Country Party was intended to represent in Parliament. After the 1924 election, which significantly strengthened the latter at the expense of the former, the Ministerial arm merged with the Nationalist Party, as did the National Labor Party, which lost most of its representation in the election.

Name	Party	District	Years in office
Edward Angelo	MCP/Nationalist	Gascoyne	1917–1933
William Angwin^{[1]}	Labor	North-East Fremantle	1904–1905; 1906–1927
George Barnard	Nationalist	Sussex	1924–1933
Henry Brown	ECP/Country	Pingelly	1924–1933
Thomas Chesson	Labor	Cue	1913–1930
Alexander Clydesdale	Labor	Canning	1921–1930
Philip Collier^{[1]}	Labor	Boulder	1905–1948
Edwin Corboy	Labor	Yilgarn	1921–1933
Aubrey Coverley	Labor	Kimberley	1924–1953
James Cunningham	Labor	Kalgoorlie	1923–1936
Thomas Davy	Nationalist	West Perth	1924–1933
James Denton	MCP/Nationalist	Moore	1921–1927
William James George	Nationalist	Murray-Wellington	1895–1902; 1909–1930
Harry Griffiths	ECP/Country	Avon	1914–1921; 1924–1935
Thomas Heron	Labor	Mount Leonora	1920–1928
John Holman^{[2]}	Labor	Forrest	1901–1921; 1923–1925
May Holman^{[2]}	Labor	Forrest	1925–1939
Thomas Hughes	Labor/Ind. Lab.	East Perth	1922–1927; 1936–1943
William Johnson	Labor	Guildford	1901–1905; 1906–1917; 1924–1948
Edward Johnston	ECP/Country	Williams-Narrogin	1911–1928
Maurice Kennedy	Labor	Greenough	1924–1930
George Lambert	Labor	Coolgardie	1916–1930; 1933–1941
Alfred Lamond	Labor	Pilbara	1924–1933
Charles Latham	MCP/Nationalist	York	1921–1942
John Lindsay	ECP/Country	Toodyay	1924–1933
John Lutey	Labor	Brownhill-Ivanhoe	1916; 1917–1932
Alick McCallum^{[1]}	Labor	South Fremantle	1921–1935
Charles Maley	MCP/Nationalist	Irwin	1921–1929
Harry Mann	Nationalist	Perth	1921–1933
William Marshall	Labor	Murchison	1921–1952
Harry Millington	Labor	Leederville	1924–1947
Hon Sir James Mitchell	Nationalist	Northam	1905–1933
Selby Munsie	Labor	Hannans	1911–1938
Charles North	Nationalist	Claremont	1924–1956
Alexander Panton	Labor	Menzies	1924–1951
Walter Richardson	Nationalist	Subiaco	1921–1933
Richard Sampson	MCP/Nationalist	Swan	1921–1944
Joseph Sleeman	Labor	Fremantle	1924–1959
James MacCallum Smith	Nationalist	North Perth	1914–1939
John Henry Smith	MCP/Nationalist	Nelson	1921–1936; 1939–1943
Sydney Stubbs	MCP/Nationalist	Wagin	1911–1947
George Taylor	Nat. Lab./Nationalist	Mount Margaret	1901–1930
Frederick Teesdale	Nationalist	Roebourne	1917–1931
Alec Thomson	ECP/Country	Katanning	1914–1930
Michael Troy^{[1]}	Labor	Mount Magnet	1904–1939
Thomas Walker	Labor	Kanowna	1905–1932
Arthur Wansbrough	Labor	Albany	1924–1936
Charles Wansbrough	ECP/Country	Beverley	1914–1917; 1924–1930
John Willcock^{[1]}	Labor	Geraldton	1917–1947
Arthur Wilson	Labor	Collie	1908–1947
Frederick Withers	Labor	Bunbury	1924–1947

== Notes ==
^{1} Following the 1924 state election a new Ministry consisting of six members, including one Member of the Legislative Council, was appointed. These members were therefore required to resign and contest ministerial by-elections on 1 May 1924, at which all were returned unopposed.
^{2} On 23 February 1925, the Labor member for Forrest, John Holman, died. The Labor candidate and daughter of the deceased, May Holman, was elected unopposed on 3 April 1925.

== Sources ==
- Black, David; Prescott, Valerie (1997). Election statistics, Legislative Assembly of Western Australia, 1890-1996. Perth: Parliamentary History Project. ISBN 0-7309-8409-5.
- Hughes, Colin A.; Graham, B. D. (1976). Voting for the South Australian, Western Australian and Tasmanian Lower Houses, 1890-1964. Canberra: Australian National University. ISBN 0-7081-1334-6.
