= Talbot West =

Locality in the Shire of Beverley, Western Australia

- Suburb
- Interactive map of Talbot West
- Coordinates: 32°07′48″S 116°41′56″E
- Country: Australia
- State: Western Australia
- LGA: Shire of Beverley

Government
  - State electorate: Central Wheatbelt
  - Federal division: Bullwinkel

Area
  - Total: 55.9 km^{2} (21.6 sq mi)

Population
  - Total: 26 (2021)
  - Density: 0.465/km^{2} (1.205/sq mi)
- Postcode: 6302

Talbot West is a rural locality of the Shire of Beverley in the Wheatbelt region of Western Australia. It has an area of 55.9 square kilometres (21.6 sq mi).

== Demographics ==
At the 2021 Australian census, Talbot West had a population of 26 people, with a median age of 51. There were 18 private dwellings in the locality.
