= Municipality of Beverley =

Former local government area in Western Australia

The Municipality of Beverley was a local government area in Western Australia centred on the town of Beverley, in the Wheatbelt region of Western Australia

It was established on 31 March 1892, separating the township of Beverley from the surrounding Beverley Road District. The first election was held at the Beverley Court House on 6 July 1893.

The council met at the Mechanics' Institute until it built a permanent council chambers in 1898, after which it operated out of the building for the remainder of its existence. The council chambers were deemed surplus to road board requirements after the municipality's abolition, and became the town's fire station before later becoming a doctor's surgery and then commercial offices.

The council was responsible for the first street lighting in Beverley, with acetylene gas lighting generated through a small unit located at the back of the council chambers. It opened municipal saleyards in 1908.

Proposals for the amalgamation of the municipality back into the Beverley Road District began c. 1912. As a result of some public opposition to the proposal, a referendum was held on 12 March 1913, which overwhelmingly supported amalgamation. The municipality formally petitioned for its dissolution on 18 March 1913, and ceased to exist with its amalgamation into the road district on 4 April 1913. The municipal area became the new Central Ward of the reconstituted road district, represented by two councillors.
