= John Marquis Hopkins =

Australian politician (1870–1912)

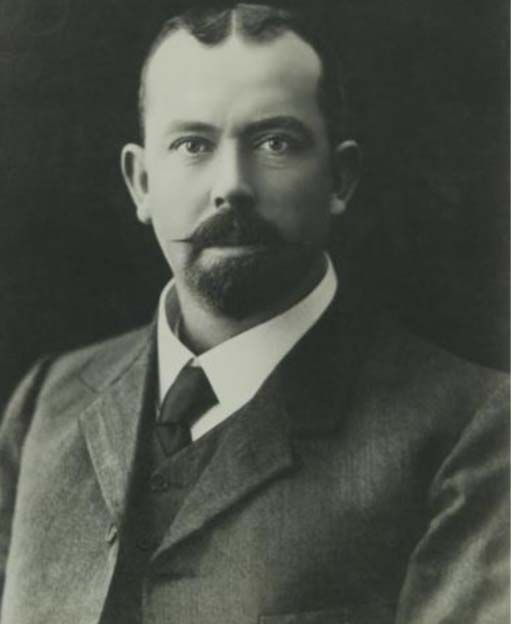
- Portrait of Hopkins

Minister for Lands
- In office 23 January 1903 – 10 August 1904
- Preceded by: Adam Jameson
- Succeeded by: John Drew

Member of the Legislative Assembly of Western Australia for Beverley
- In office 11 September 1908 – 28 July 1910
- Preceded by: Edmund Smith
- Succeeded by: Nat Harper

Member of the Legislative Assembly of Western Australia for Boulder
- In office 24 April 1901 – 27 October 1905
- Preceded by: Electoral district created
- Succeeded by: Philip Collier

Personal details
- Born: 27 August 1870 Ballarat, Victoria, Australia
- Died: 3 July 1912 (aged 41) Melbourne, Victoria, Australia
- Resting place: Springvale Cemetery
- Spouse: Thomasina Henrietta Alice Benzley (m. 1896)
- Children: 5

John Marquis Hopkins (27 August 1870 – 3 July 1912) was an Australian politician. He was a member of the Legislative Assembly of Western Australia, representing the electoral districts of Boulder and Beverley. He had previously been mayor of Boulder, and in 1910, he was jailed for five years for uttering, but was released in October 1911.

== Early life ==
John Marquis Hopkins was born on 17 August 1870 in Ballarat, Victoria to John and Alexandrina MacKay.

He was left orphaned at the age of thirteen and subsequently educated at a state school.

Hopkins worked for the Victoria Railway Service as a porter for two years before going into business with his brother. By 1896 he was working as an auctioneer and sharebroker in Boulder, Western Australia.

== Political career ==
Hopkins was the first Mayor of Boulder, being first elected on 11 October 1897. He served in the position for three terms.

In March 1901 Hopkins stood in the federal election, contesting the Kalgoorlie seat in the House of Representatives. He secured 3015 votes, losing to John Kirwan's 5374 votes.

The following month, Hopkins successfully contested the Boulder seat in the state Legislative Assembly. He was elected as an oppositionalist. At the 1904 election he was re-elected with a majority of 497. His next attempt at election in 1905 resulted in a narrow loss, by 19 votes, to Phillip Collier.

== Conviction and imprisonment ==
Hopkins was accused of having forged a promissory note and subsequently uttering it. Amongst the witnesses for the trial were Samuel Joseph Fortescue Moore, a fellow Member of the Legislative Assembly, and Edward McLarty, a Member of the Legislative Council who accused Hopkins of having also uttered their promissory notes.

Following a trial at the Criminal Court in Perth before Justice McMillan and a jury of twelve men, Hopkins was found not guilty of forgery and guilty of uttering on 13 April 1910. He was sentenced to imprisonment for a period of five years. An appeal was lodged with the Full Court, but Hopkins' full sentence was confirmed on 18 April 1910. He was imprisoned at Fremantle Gaol.

As a result of his conviction, Hopkins was removed from office as Member of the Legislative Assembly for Beverley.

In October 1911, he was released having served only 18 months of his five year sentence. Hopkins had been granted clemency by the Governor of the state owing to his declining health.

== Death ==
Hopkins died in Melbourne, Victoria on 3 July 1912 at the age of 42.

He was interred at Springvale Cemetery in Melbourne.

Parliament of Western Australia
| Preceded by Adam Jameson | Minister for Lands; 1903—1904 | Succeeded by John Drew |
Western Australian Legislative Assembly
| Preceded by Edmund Smith | Member for Beverley; 1908—1910 | Succeeded by Nat Harper |
| New district | Member for Boulder; 1901—1905 | Succeeded by Philip Collier |
