= Shire of Beverley =

Coordinates: 32°06′32″S 116°55′34″E

- Local government area
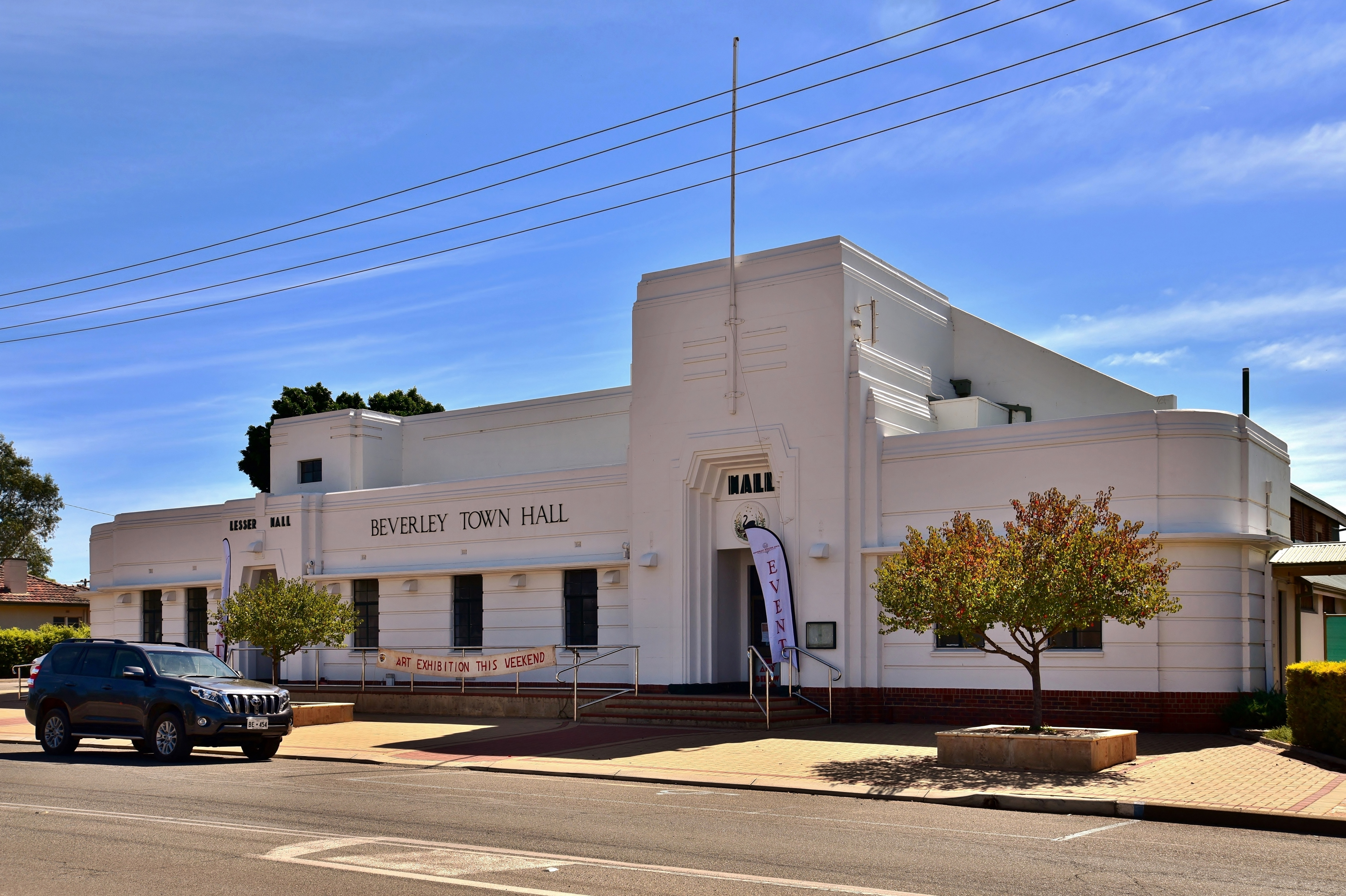
- Beverley Town Hall, 2018

- Interactive map of Shire of Beverley
- Country: Australia
- State: Western Australia
- Region: Wheatbelt
- Established: 1871
- Council seat: Beverley

Government
  - Shire President: David White
  - State electorate: Central Wheatbelt
  - Federal division: Bullwinkel

Area
  - Total: 2,372.2 km^{2} (915.9 sq mi)

Population
  - Total: 1,694 (LGA 2021)
- Website: Shire of Beverley
LGAs around Shire of Beverley
| Kalamunda | York | Quairading |
| Armadale | Shire of Beverley | Quairading |
| Wandering | Brookton | Brookton |

The Shire of Beverley is a local government area in the Wheatbelt region of Western Australia about 130 kilometres (80 mi) southeast of Perth, the state capital. The Shire covers an area of 2,372 square kilometres (916 sq mi), starting 20 kilometres (12 mi) outside Armadale in the Darling Scarp and extending eastwards beyond the scarp into agricultural lands which support broad acre activities such as livestock and cropping. Its seat of government is the town of Beverley, which accommodates just over half of the Shire's population.

== History ==
The Beverley Road District was proclaimed on 24 January 1871. It was initially far larger on its eastern and southern sides than the present shire, extending east to the colonial border.

The township of Beverley itself was separated as the Municipality of Beverley on 31 March 1892 and the East Beverley Road District separated on 18 October 1895.

The Brookton Road District was separated from Beverley on 26 April 1906. However, on 27 April 1906, the East Beverley district was abolished, partially re-absorbed into Beverley and partially into the new Brookton board.

The Municipality of Beverley was re-absorbed into the road district on 4 April 1913.

It was declared a shire and named the Shire of Beverley with effect from 1 July 1961 following the passage of the Local Government Act 1960, which reformed all remaining road districts into shires.

== Wards ==
The Shire is divided into three wards, which became effective on 2 May 1987.

- North Ward (three councillors)
- West Ward (three councillors)
- South Ward (three councillors)

Prior to 1986, the Shire was represented by eight councillors across four wards which had existed in some form since the amalgamation of the Municipal District in 1913:

- Kokeby Ward
- North East Ward
- Central Ward
- Dale Ward

=== 2023 election results ===
2023 Western Australian local elections: Beverley
| Party | Candidate | Votes | % | ±% |
|---|---|---|---|---|
| Independent | Dee Ridgway (elected) | 484 | 72.89 | |
| Independent | Darryl Brown (elected) | 79 | 11.90 | |
| Independent | Chris Lawlor (elected) | 68 | 10.24 | |
| Independent | Barry Shardlow | 33 | 4.97 | |
| Total formal votes | | 664 | 99.25 | |
| Informal votes | | 5 | 0.75 | |
| Turnout | | 669 | 47.28 | |

== Towns and localities ==
The towns and localities of the Shire of Beverley with population and size figures based on the most recent Australian census:

| Locality | Population | Area | Map |
|---|---|---|---|
| Bally Bally | 54 (SAL 2021) | 184.5 km^{2} (71.2 sq mi) | |
| Beverley | 1,109 (SAL 2021) | 384.1 km^{2} (148.3 sq mi) | |
| Dale | 190 (SAL 2021) | 399.9 km^{2} (154.4 sq mi) | |
| East Beverley | 96 (SAL 2016) | 254.3 km^{2} (98.2 sq mi) | |
| Flint | 0 (SAL 2016) | 568.7 km^{2} (219.6 sq mi) | |
| Kokeby | 90 (SAL 2021) | 199.9 km^{2} (77.2 sq mi) | |
| Morbinning | 36 (SAL 2021) | 147.2 km^{2} (56.8 sq mi) | |
| Talbot West | 26 (SAL 2021) | 55.9 km^{2} (21.6 sq mi) | |
| Westdale | 93 (SAL 2021) | 174.2 km^{2} (67.3 sq mi) | |

== Population ==
Historical population

| Year | Pop. | ±% p.a. |
|---|---|---|
| 1921 | 1,882 | — |
| 1933 | 1,992 | +0.47% |
| 1947 | 1,629 | −1.43% |
| 1954 | 1,968 | +2.74% |
| 1961 | 1,899 | −0.51% |
| 1966 | 1,773 | −1.36% |
| 1971 | 1,628 | −1.69% |
| 1976 | 1,577 | −0.63% |
| 1981 | 1,554 | −0.29% |

| Year | Pop. | ±% p.a. |
|---|---|---|
| 1986 | 1,502 | −0.68% |
| 1991 | 1,433 | −0.94% |
| 1996 | 1,399 | −0.48% |
| 2001 | 1,461 | +0.87% |
| 2006 | 1,562 | +1.35% |
| 2011 | 1,567 | +0.06% |
| 2016 | 1,745 | +2.18% |
| 2021 | 1,694 | −0.59% |

== Notable councillors ==
- Henry Lukin, Beverley Road Board member 1876; later a state MP
- Edmund Smith, Beverley Road Board member 1894–1896, chairman 1896; later a state MP
- Frank Broun, Beverley Road Board member 1902–1904, 1906–1914, 1917–1919, chairman 1908–1909, 1911–1914, 1917–1919; also a state MP

== Heritage-listed places ==
As of 2023, 95 places are heritage-listed in the Shire of Beverley, of which 18 are on the State Register of Heritage Places.
