= Edmund Horace Smith =

Australian politician

Edmund Smith

Member of the Legislative Assembly of Western Australia for Beverley
- In office 27 October 1905 – 11 September 1908
- Preceded by: Charles Harper
- Succeeded by: John Hopkins

Personal details
- Born: 8 April 1855 Beverley, Western Australia, Australia
- Died: 6 July 1931 (aged 76) Beverley, Western Australia, Australia

Edmund Horace Smith (8 April 1855 – 6 July 1931) was an Australian politician who was a member of the Legislative Assembly of Western Australia from 1905 to 1908, representing the seat of Beverley.

== Early life and career ==
Smith was born in Beverley, a small town in Western Australia's Wheatbelt region, to Anne (née Chapman) and Charles Smith. He lived in the North West for a period in the 1880s, and then returned to Beverley, where he worked as a storekeeper. Smith was elected to the Beverley Road Board in 1894, and served until 1896, including as chairman for a period. He was elected to parliament at the 1905 state election, running as a Ministerialist (a supporter of the government of Hector Rason). Smith held his seat until the 1908 election, where he was defeated by John Hopkins.

== Death and personal life ==
Smith died in Beverley in July 1931, aged 76. He had married Julia Edwards in 1885, with whom he had ten children. One of his daughters married James Mann, who was also a member of parliament.

Parliament of Western Australia
Preceded by Charles Harper	Member for Beverley; 1905–1908	Succeeded by John Hopkins
