= Frank Broun =

Australian politician

The Honourable Frank Broun

Minister for Public Health
- In office 12 March 1921 – 22 August 1922
- Preceded by: Hal Colebatch
- Succeeded by: Richard Sampson

Colonial Secretary
- In office 25 June 1919 – 22 August 1922
- Preceded by: John Scaddan
- Succeeded by: Richard Sampson

Member of the Legislative Assembly of Western Australia for Beverley
- In office 29 September 1917 – 22 March 1924
- Preceded by: Charles Wansbrough
- Succeeded by: Charles Wansbrough
- In office 3 October 1911 – 21 November 1914
- Preceded by: Nat Harper
- Succeeded by: Charles Wansbrough

Personal details
- Born: 31 May 1876 Beverley, Western Australia, Australia
- Died: 1 April 1930 (aged 53) Beverley, Western Australia, Australia
- Party: Country
- Other political affiliations: Liberal (until 1917)

Frank Tyndall Broun (31 May 1876 – 1 April 1930) was an Australian politician who was a member of the Legislative Assembly of Western Australia from 1911 to 1914 and again from 1917 to 1924. He was a minister in the first government of Sir James Mitchell.

Broun was born in Beverley, Western Australia, to Emily Jane (née Lukin) and James William Broun. His grandfather, Peter Broun, was the first Colonial Secretary of Western Australia. After a period working for his father, Broun acquired an estate of 5,000 acres (20 km^{2}) near Beverley, on which he farmed both sheep and wheat. He was elected to the Beverley Road Board in 1902, and remained a member for most of the following 20 years, including as chairman on three occasions (1908–1909, 1911–1914, and 1917–1919). Broun was first elected to parliament at the 1911 state election, replacing Nat Harper in the seat of Beverley. A member of the Liberal Party, he left parliament at the 1914 election, and was replaced by a Country Party candidate, Charles Wansbrough.

At the 1917 state election, Wansbrough did not re-contest Beverley. Broun, who had switched to the Country Party himself, reclaimed his former seat. In June 1919, he was selected to replace John Scaddan (another Country Party member) as Colonial Secretary in the government of James Mitchell, who had become premier only the previous month. After the 1921 state election, Broun was also made Minister for Public Health, replacing Hal Colebatch. He left the ministry in August 1922, with Richard Sampson taking over both of his portfolios. The Country Party split into two rival factions the following year, with Broun joining the Ministerial faction (which supported the Mitchell government). However, he did not recontest his seat at the 1924 state election. Broun died at his home in Beverley in April 1930, aged 53. He killed himself by taking cyanide. Broun had married May Constance Sewell in 1903, with whom he had three sons and three daughters.

Parliament of Western Australia
Preceded by Hal Colebatch	Minister for Public Health; 1921-1922	Succeeded by Richard Sampson
Preceded by John Scaddan	Colonial Secretary; 1919-1922	Succeeded by Richard Sampson
Western Australian Legislative Assembly
Preceded by Charles Wansbrough	Member for Beverley; 1917-1924	Succeeded by Charles Wansbrough
Preceded by Nat Harper	Member for Beverley; 1911-1914	Succeeded by Charles Wansbrough
