= Nat Harper =

Australian politician and businessman (1865–1954)

Member of the Western Australian Legislative Assembly
- In office 16 August 1910 – 21 October 1914
- Preceded by: John Marquis Hopkins
- Succeeded by: Henry Hickmott
- Constituency: Beverley (1910–1911); Pingelly (1911–1914)

Personal details
- Born: Nathaniel White Harper; 18 March 1865 Ballymena, County Antrim, Northern Ireland
- Died: 3 January 1954 (aged 88) West Perth, Western Australia, Australia
- Resting place: Karrakatta Cemetery
- Party: Liberal
- Spouse(s): Margaret Jane Thomas (m. 1891; died 1921) Olive Estelle Story (m. 1924)
- Children: 5
- Relatives: Bill Grayden (grandson); David Grayden (grandson)
- Profession: Mine manager, investor

Nathaniel White Harper (18 March 1865 – 3 January 1954) was an Australian politician and businessman. He was a member of the Western Australian Legislative Assembly from 1910 until 1914, representing the seats of Beverley and Pingelly. He was the grandfather of politicians David Grayden and Bill Grayden.

== Early life ==
Nathaniel White Harper was born on 18 March 1865 in Ballymena, County Antrim, Northern Ireland, United Kingdom to John Harper, a farmer, and Margaret Harper (née White).

== Mining career ==
Harper emigrated to New Zealand in 1883 where he worked in a gold mine in Otago. In 1887 he moved to Australia, working mines in Broken Hill, New South Wales and earning the position of mine foreman. From there, he went on to manage a mine in Zeehan, Tasmania. Harper arrived in Western Australia in 1892, managing mines first at Fraser's mine in Southern Cross and later at the White Feather Main Reef in Kanowna.

== Political career ==
Harper was mayor of Kanowna three times between 1897 and 1901.

In 1897, he stood for election in the seat of North-East Coolgardie, losing to Frederick Vosper by 53 votes.

His next foray into politics was more successful, with Harper winning the seat of Beverley in the Legislative Assembly in a 1910 by-election. He defeated opponent Walter James by 92 votes. The by-election was called following the imprisonment of the incumbent, John Hopkins, which rendered the seat vacant.

Harper was again elected to the Legislative Assembly at the 1911 election, this time for the Pingelly seat. He served a full term and stood again at the 1914 election this time being defeated by Henry Hickmott of the Country Party, 889 votes to 657.

== Personal life ==
Harper married Margaret Jane Thomas on 19 September 1891 at her family home in Naseby. The couple has two sons and a daughter. Margaret died on 15 September 1921.

On 5 September 1924 Harper married his second wife, Olive Estelle Story at Scots Church in Melbourne, Victoria.

Western Australian Legislative Assembly
Preceded by Electoral district created	Member for Pingelly; 1911–1914	Succeeded by Henry Hickmott
Preceded by John Hopkins	Member for Beverley; 1910–1911	Succeeded by Frank Broun
