= Harrie Seward =

Australian politician

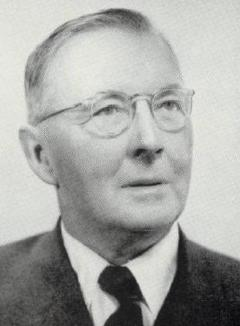

Senator for Western Australia
- In office 28 April 1951 – 23 July 1958

Member of the Legislative Assembly of Western Australia for Pingelly
- In office 11 February 1933 – 25 March 1950
- Preceded by: Henry Brown
- Succeeded by: Electoral district abolished

Personal details
- Born: 26 February 1884 Rochester, Victoria, Australia
- Died: 23 July 1958 (aged 74) Subiaco, Western Australia, Australia
- Party: Country
- Occupation: Farmer

Harrie Stephen Seward (26 February 1884 – 23 July 1958) was an Australian politician. He was a Senator for Western Australia from 1951 until his death in 1958, representing the Country Party. He previously served in the Western Australian Legislative Assembly from 1933 to 1950 and was briefly a state government minister.

== Early life ==
Seward was born on 26 February 1884 in Rochester, Victoria. The oldest of four brothers, including footballer Leo Seward, he was the son of Mary Ellen (née Kelleher) and Stephen Seward. His father was a farmer and long-serving secretary of the Shire of Echuca.

Seward was educated at St Patrick's College, Ballarat. In 1900 he joined the Commercial Banking Company's Ballarat branch. He transferred to the Bank of Australasia in 1903 and worked in New Zealand until 1908, when he returned to Victoria and managed a rural bank.

In 1913, Seward moved to Pingelly, Western Australia, joining his brothers on a wheat farming property. He was prominent in the local agricultural society and in the Primary Producers' Association.

== Military service ==
In August 1915, Seward enlisted in the Australian Imperial Force (AIF). He saw service with the 3rd, 49th and 58th Battalions on the Western Front and was evacuated to English hospitals on two occasions, first with a broken ankle and later with gunshot wounds to the head and leg sustained at the Battle of Polygon Wood.

Seward was commissioned as a lieutenant in July 1917 but was invalided to Australia in January 1918 as a quartermaster's adjutant on HMAS Euripides. He re-enlisted in July 1918 and returned to his battalion in France in November 1918, shortly before the end of the war. He was discharged from the AIF in June 1919 and returned to Pingelly.

== State politics ==
Seward first stood for parliament at the 1921 state election, unsuccessfully contesting the seat of Pingelly with the endorsement of both the Country Party and the National Labor Party. He again contested Pingelly in 1930 as a Country Party candidate before succeeding on his third attempt at the 1933 election.

Following the 1947 election, Seward was appointed minister for railways and transport in the government of Ross McLarty. His seat of Pingelly was abolished prior to the 1950 election and he unsuccessfully contested the new seat of Roe, but was defeated by fellow Country Party member Charles Perkins, the sitting member for the also abolished seat of York.

== Federal politics ==
Seaward was elected to a three-year Senate term at the 1951 federal election, which followed a double dissolution. He was re-elected to a six-year term at the 1953 election, and died in office having announced his intention to retire at the 1958 election.

In the Senate, Seward spoke predominantly on matters affecting rural communities, including the need for better roads and telephones, government promotion of superphosphate and other fertilisers, and standardisation of the railway gauge in Western Australia. In 1953, he moved a resolution proposing a constitutional convention to review federal–state relations, also suggesting that a portion of the Senate should be nominated by state parliaments "from various groups in the community, such as commerce, local government, and primary and secondary industry".

In 1952, Seward publicly criticised Prime Minister Robert Menzies' agricultural policy on the grounds that it did not do enough to support farmers. He crossed the floor on several occasions to vote against the Menzies government, including a 1953 bill allowing for commercial television and a 1958 bill increasing wages for stevedores. On the 1953 bill, he stated "I am certainly no socialist, and do not believe in control by the Government, but it so happens that television is one of the few things that may be controlled by governments".

== Personal life ==
In 1935, Seward married Eveline Brown; the couple had no children. He died on 23 July 1958 at St John of God Hospital, Subiaco, aged 74, "after an illness lasting several months".

Parliament of Western Australia
Preceded by Henry Brown	Member for Pingelly; 1933–1950	Succeeded by Electoral district abolished
