= Arthur Wansbrough =

Australian politician

Member of the Legislative Assembly of Western Australia
- In office 22 March 1924 – 15 February 1936
- Preceded by: John Scaddan
- Succeeded by: Leonard Hill
- Constituency: Albany

Personal details
- Born: 20 August 1877 York, Western Australia, Australia
- Died: 3 September 1949 (aged 72) Albany, Western Australia, Australia
- Party: Labor

Arthur William Wansbrough (20 August 1877 – 3 September 1949) was an Australian trade unionist and politician who was a Labor Party member of the Legislative Assembly of Western Australia from 1924 to 1936, representing the seat of Albany.

Wansbrough was born in York, Western Australia, to Matilda (née Massingham) and Joseph Wansbrough. He was raised in Beverley, where his parents were among the first settlers, and after leaving school worked in a post office for a period. In 1896, Wansbrough joined Western Australian Government Railways (WAGR), eventually becoming the senior guard on the Great Southern Railway (based out of Albany). He and his brothers purchased a farming property at Bally Bally (near Beverley) in 1898, but he relinquished his share in 1904. Wansbrough first stood for parliament at the 1921 state election, but lost to the sitting Country Party member for Albany, John Scaddan (who was a former Labor premier). The following year, at the 1922 Legislative Council elections, he contested South-East Province, but was defeated by the Country Party's Alfred Burvill.

At the 1924 state election, which saw the election of a Labor government, Wansbrough successfully re-contested the seat of Albany. He remained in parliament until the 1936 election, when he was defeated by a Country candidate, Leonard Hill. After leaving parliament, Wansbrough returned to the railways. He attempted to reclaim his seat at the 1939 election but was unsuccessful. Wansbrough died in Albany in September 1949, aged 72. He had married Ada Louise Cooper in 1903, with whom he had four children. Wansbrough's older brother, Charles Wansbrough, was also a member of parliament, representing the Country Party in the seat of Beverley. They served together from 1924 to 1930, and are the only brothers in the history of the Parliament of Western Australia to have represented different parties while sitting together.

Parliament of Western Australia
Preceded by John Scaddan	Member for Albany; 1924–1936	Succeeded by Leonard Hill
