= Henry Hickmott =

Australian politician

Member of the Legislative Assembly of Western Australia for Pingelly
- In office 14 October 1914 – 22 March 1924
- Preceded by: Nat Harper
- Succeeded by: Henry Brown

Personal details
- Born: Henry Edward Hickmott; 17 May 1853 Mount Barker, South Australia
- Died: 18 January 1931 (aged 77) Pingelly, Western Australia
- Spouses: Elizabeth Ann Owen (m. 1877; died 1923) Sarah Ellen Clarke (m. 1925)
- Occupation: Farmer

Henry Edward Hickmott (17 May 1853 – 18 January 1931) was an Australian farmer. He served as the Member of Western Australian Legislative Assembly for Pingelly from 1914 to 1924.

== Life and times in South Australia and Victoria ==
Henry Edward Hickmott was born at Mount Barker in South Australia on 17 May 1853, the only son of Henry Hickmott (1825–1914) and Sophia Goldsmith (1828–1853). His parents and two older sisters, Emma and Eliza Hickmott, had sailed from London to Port Adelaide on the Emily in 1849 and then travelled to Mount Barker where Henry Edward's father worked at the local brick works. Another daughter Rebecca was born 1851. Henry Edward's paternal grandfather, Samuel Hickmott (1799 – c.1872) had earlier been transported to Van Diemen's Land in 1840 for sheep-stealing. There is some evidence that Samuel may have travelled to South Australia to join his youngest son and his family there.

Henry Edward's mother, Sophia, died not long after his birth and his father quickly remarried, to Harriet Waters in Adelaide in 1853 under the name of Henry Richards. They lived for a time with Harriet's family in the rural settlement of Meadows. In 1854 Henry and Harriet and their family travelled to Melbourne in Victoria and thence to the gold-rush town of Clunes where they lived for the next twenty years. While at Clunes Henry Edward, like his father, worked as a miner, labourer and brick-maker. It seems that although he had no formal education he was well-learned. In her memoir I Loved Teaching Frances Elliott notes that Henry Edward, who had been invited to adjudicate a classroom debate

"… had never attended school, and yet he could write a very good letter. Having a stepmother, he had to go out and earn his living at an early age. He told us that the different people he worked for were always very willing to help him in his willingness to learn. He made a very satisfactory adjudicator".

She concluded by adding that he "later became a Member of Parliament in Western Australia".

In 1872, Henry Edward moved with his parents and step-siblings to the Wimmera township of Charlton where his father had purchased a farm, and would also establish a brickyard overlooking the river on Olive Street. On 27 October 1877, he married Elizabeth Ann Owen, the sister of a close friend and fellow local cricketer John Richard Owen, at Kingower near Bendigo. Elizabeth was born at Emerald Hill in 1855. Her parents, Edward Owen and Elizabeth Evens, were both from Wales. They met and were married at Liverpool in England in 1850 and sailed from there to Victoria in 1852. Lured by the news of fresh discoveries of gold in the Kingower/Inglewood region, Edward, or Taffy as he was known, and his family moved from Melbourne to Bet Bet near Dunolly around 1857 and then on to Kingower. The old couple remained there through the town's boom and bust periods - the population of Kingower peaked at around 8,000 in the 1860s, before declining to just 100 by the time of Edward's death in 1908. His wife Elizabeth died in Kingower in 1893. They are both buried in unmarked graves in Kingower's fast disappearing cemetery.

In the same year he was married, Henry Edward's stepmother, Harriet Hickmott née Waters, was killed when she was struck by lightning at her home in East Charlton. The incident was recorded in the St Arnaud Mercury on 17 February as follows:

'About 5pm on Wednesday a severe thunderstorm burst over East Charlton, and an hour later Mrs Hickmott and her son Samuel (a youth of 18 or 20) had just returned to their home in that township after a visit to a selection belonging to the family at Watson's Lakes, when a flash of lightning struck them both dead in the doorway of their house ... Mrs Hickmott was thrown several yards out of the building, the apparel around her chest and shoulders being set ablaze, and her face much disfigured by the electric current, which appears to have struck her on the head and traveled down her right side. Her son Samuel was smitten on the right shoulder the current passing diagonally across his body until it came to his heart, his clothing being burnt even to the undershirt. Another son, named James, who was indoors at the time, was struck on the left forearm and hip, and for a time was paralysed, but has since recovered.'.

While at Charlton, Henry Edward worked mainly as a brick maker and building and roads contractor, with evident success. In 1881, he purchased a farm at West Charlton and in 1885 had built, on Camp Street in the eastern part of the town, a four-roomed brick house. This and a similar dwelling built for his stepbrother, John James Hickmott, were, the leader writer of the East Charlton Tribune informed his readers, 'additional evidence of the increasing development of the rapidly rising town of Charlton which, at the present rate of progression, promises to become a large and populous provincial centre of activity'. An elder of the local Wesleyan Church, Henry Edward was said to have given a 'short but stirring speech' there in March 1886 to mark the retirement of its minister, the Reverend E. Taylor. In October the following year he used the local newspaper to announce that he had for sale 'colonial salt' that was extracted from Lake Kunat Kunat by his brother-in-law Joseph Smith of L'Albert (Joseph Colmer Smith married Henry's older sister Rebecca Hickmott at Clunes on 25 August 1869. A Cornishman, he was born at St Austell in 1832, the son of Thomas Colmer Smith, a storekeeper, and Jane Rowett).

Henry Edward's passion beyond his family, work and religion, was cricket. In this capacity, he was described by the East Charlton Tribune as a 'trundler' who sometimes 'disturbed the peace' of his opponents' 'timberyard' and, very occasionally, scored a few runs. Perhaps his most notable achievement was against St Arnaud on 20 October 1879, where he took 2/19 and participated in a last wicket stand which resulted in a historic win over East Charlton's arch rivals. The joy of winning was to be short lived, however, as East Charlton, and Henry Edward's bowling, were thrashed in a return match held at St Arnaud a couple of weeks later.

In 1890, Henry Edward sold up his Charlton holdings and moved with his growing family northwards to Lalbert where they stayed for the next eighteen years. The family lived initially on Joseph Smith's 186-acre (0.75 km^{2}) block of land (allotment 47B), which was located on the eastern side of the town. The children from the Hickmott and Smith families made up the bulk of the early classes of Lalbert School No 2990 which was built by the local community and opened on 18 March 1889. By this stage, Henry and his family were living on their own farm some three miles (5 km) to the east of Lalbert. As at Charlton Henry Edward worked as a farmer and building and roads contractor, conducting road works in and around the township, and overseeing on behalf of the council engineer the clearing of mallee scrub from different properties. He served for a time as a Trustee of the Lalbert cemetery and the Chairman of the local Vermin Board. And, of course, he continued to play cricket.

== To Western Australia ==
The returns from farming at Lalbert were not as first expected due in part to drought conditions and the continuing rabbit menace. In 1909, Henry and Elizabeth sold their land at Lalbert and sailed to Western Australia where they had purchased a farm, that they named 'Dingley Dell', at Pingelly just outside Brookton. At Brookton Henry again became actively involved in the local community, serving as a founding member of the Brookton Farmers and Settlers Association and its President for two years and a patron of the Brookton Swimming Club. On 21 October 1914, he was elected as the member for Pingelly in the Western Australian Parliament where he sat for three terms before being defeated at the 1924 election. During the First World War, Henry also served on the Brookton Repatriation Committee which raised funds and other support for the soldiers and their dependents, and helped returned men find employment.

On 16 April 1923, Henry Edward's wife, Elizabeth, died while visiting her son William Henry Hickmott and his family at their farm near Ouyen in the Mallee district of Victoria. Two years later Henry married Sarah Ellen Clarke in Perth. It is not known whether they had any children. On Sunday 18 January 1931, Henry Edward was killed in a farming accident. He was laying rabbit poison on his property when his cart hit a stone and he was thrown to the ground, breaking his neck. His funeral took place the following day and he was buried in the Methodist section of the Brookton Cemetery. His second wife, Sarah Ellen Hickmott, died at East Perth on 4 October 1957, aged 87 years.

== Family and descendants ==
Henry Edward and Elizabeth Ann Hickmott (née Owen) had twelve children:

1. Sophia Elizabeth Hickmott who married George William Lewis at Charlton in 1898 and had two children.
2. John Edward Hickmott (1880–1971) who married Ada Elizabeth Free at Charlton in 1903 and had nine children.
3. Edward James Hickmott.
4. Florence Mary Hickmott (1882–1977). Florence seems to have gone to Western Australia before her parents moved there in 1909. She married Richard Austin at Cottesloe in 1904 and had four children, all born in Perth. She seems to have remarried later in life, and died in Victoria as Florence Mary Wilmshurst.
5. Alice Ann Hickmott (1884–1948) who married Johan Otto Weise at Eaglehawk in Victoria in 1910 and had one child. She and Otto are buried at Mount Lawley in Western Australia.
6. Edith Olive Hickmott (1885–1912) who married Herbert Digby Lewis, the brother of George William Lewis, at Charlton in 1903 and had four children.
7. William Henry Hickmott (1887–1976). William married Frances Alice Free at Lalbert in 1910 and farmed near Ouyen in Victoria. He and Frances had sixteen children.
8. George Alfred Hickmott. Born at Charlton in 1880, George went with his parents to the west where he had earlier worked as a miner. He married Mena ('Minnie') Spice there in 1920 and had two sons.
9. Ruby Minnie Hickmott (1893–1941). Minnie accompanied her parents to Western Australia. She married Enoch Holdsworth there in 1916 and had at least three children.
10. Ella Adeline (1895–1975) who married Robert Bowron in Western Australia in 1911 and had at least one child.
11. Rebecca Elsie Hickmott.
12. James Author Hickmott (1903–1922). Author was killed in a shooting accident on his parents' property near Brookton.

Western Australian Legislative Assembly
Preceded by Nat Harper	Member for Pingelly; 1914–1924	Succeeded by Henry Brown
