= Alfred Burvill =

Australian politician

The Honourable Alfred Burvill MLC

Member of the Western Australian Legislative Council for North-East Province
- In office 22 May 1922 – 1928

Alfred Burvill (2 August 1861 – 7 April 1938) was an Australian politician. He was a member of the Western Australian Legislative Council representing the North-East Province from his election on 22 May 1922 until his retirement in 1928. Burvill was a member of the Country Party.
