= Executive Country Party =

Former Western Australian political party

The Executive Country Party was a splinter group from the Western Australian branch of the Country Party of Australia that was active in the mid-1920s. It was led by the state deputy leader of the Country Party, Alec Thomson. The members of the Executive faction wanted better representation of the Primary Producers' Association by the party, while the remainder (known as the Majority Country Party) chose to primarily support the Nationalist coalition led by then Premier James Mitchell. In 1923, three members of the 16-member Country Party split to form the ECP.

The Executive Country Party contested the 1924 Western Australian elections, winning six seats in total. The Majority Country Party meanwhile was reduced from 13 to seven seats, and the Nationalist Coalition was defeated by the Labor opposition, led by Philip Collier.

Following that defeat, the Majority Country Party amalgamated with the Nationalists to form the United Party of Western Australia, and the ECP renamed itself the Country Party of Western Australia. They returned to government at the 1930 election, supporting James Mitchell's second government in a renewed coalition.
