= James Isaac Mann =

Australian politician

James Mann

Member of the Legislative Assembly of Western Australia for Avon Valley
- In office 25 March 1950 – 31 March 1962
- Preceded by: Electoral district created
- Succeeded by: Electoral district abolished

Member of the Legislative Assembly of Western Australia for Beverley
- In office 12 April 1930 – 25 March 1950
- Preceded by: Charles Wansbrough
- Succeeded by: Electoral district abolished

Personal details
- Born: 22 June 1892 Toodyay, Western Australia, Australia
- Died: 20 June 1965 (aged 72) Beverley, Western Australia, Australia
- Party: Liberal
- Other political affiliations: Country (1924; 1930–1949); Nationalist (1927); Independent (1949)

James Isaac Mann (22 June 1892 – 20 June 1965) was an Australian politician who was a member of the Legislative Assembly of Western Australia from 1930 to 1962. He represented two Wheatbelt electorates, holding the seat of Beverley from 1930 to 1950 and the seat of Avon Valley from 1950 to 1962, and at various times sat for the Country Party, the Nationalist Party, the Liberal Party, and as an independent.

== Early life ==
Mann was born in Toodyay, Western Australia, to Caroline Jane (née Edwards) and John Gibson Mann. He was raised in Beverley, where his father was an early settler and served as the town's mayor for a period. Mann enlisted in the Australian Imperial Force in December 1914, and during the war served with the 10th Light Horse Regiment. After returning to Australia, he took up land at Beverley as part of a soldier settlement scheme.

== Politics ==
Mann first ran for parliament at the 1924 state election, but was narrowly defeated by Charles Wansbrough in the seat of Beverley, losing by just 15 votes on the two-candidate-preferred count. Both Mann and Wansbrough stood for the Country Party, but owing to a split in party stood for different factions, with Mann representing the Ministerial faction (supporting the government of James Mitchell) and Wansbrough representing the Executive faction (opposing Mitchell's government).

At the 1927 state election, Mann recontested Beverley for the Nationalist Party, but was again defeated by Wansbrough. He had switched back to the Country Party by the 1930 election, and on his third attempt defeated Wansbrough with 55.4 percent of the two-candidate-preferred vote. From 1943 to 1947, Mann was deputy chairman of committees in the Legislative Assembly. He resigned from the Country Party in March 1949, and initially sat as an independent before joining the Liberal and Country League in May 1949. He was a supporter of a merger between the two parties (in order to provide a more consistent opposition to the Labor Party), and the Liberal Party later merged into Liberal and Country League.

The seat of Beverley was abolished at the 1950 state election, and Mann transferred to the new seat of Avon Valley. He held that seat until his retirement at the 1962 election, consistently winning large majorities (and running unopposed on one occasion, in 1953). Mann and Ross McLarty (who also retired in 1962) were the last remaining MPs elected in 1930.

== Later life and family ==
Mann died in Beverley in June 1965, aged 72. He had married Clara Constance Smith in April 1919, with whom he had two sons and two daughters. His father-in-law, Edmund Horace Smith, was also a member of parliament.

Western Australian Legislative Assembly
Preceded by Electoral district created	Member for Avon Valley; 1950-1962	Succeeded by Electoral district abolished
Preceded by Charles Wansbrough	Member for Beverley; 1930-1950	Succeeded by Electoral district abolished
