= Charles Wansbrough =

Australian politician

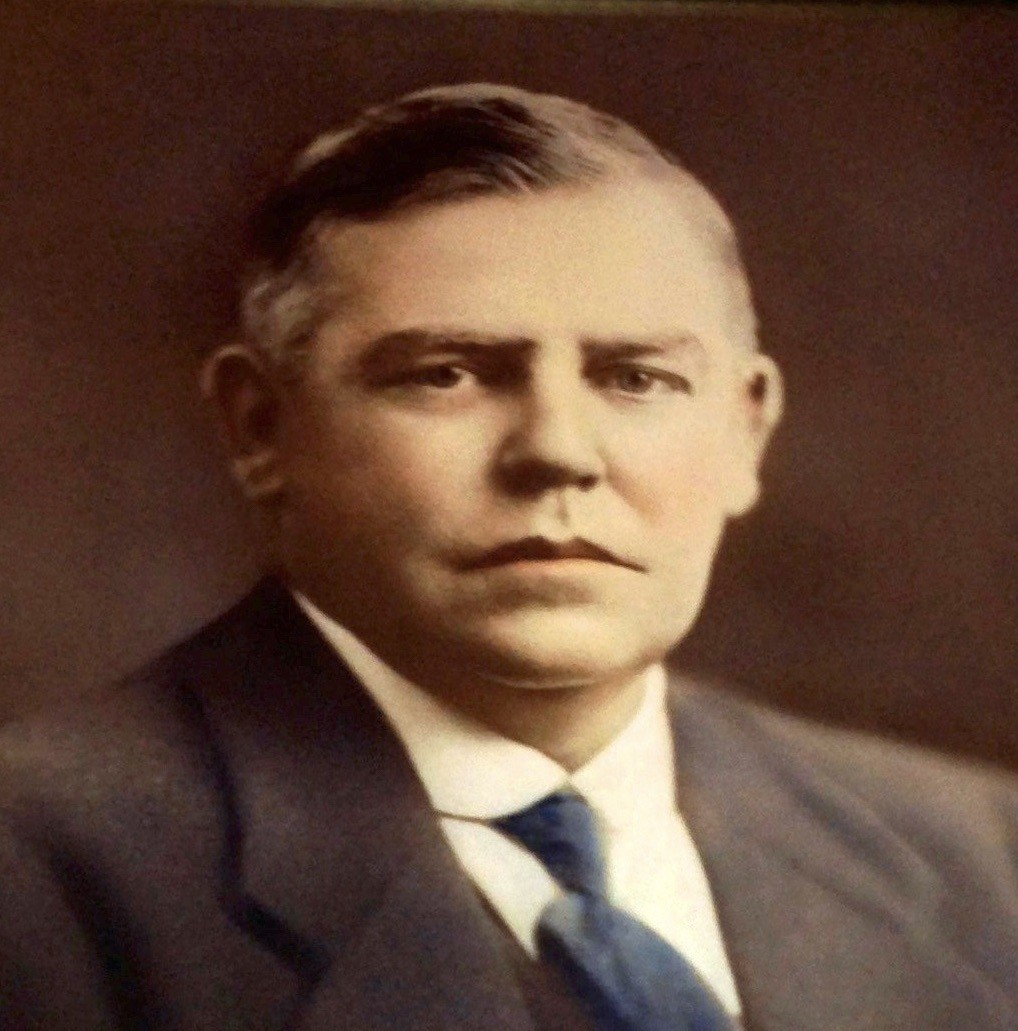

Member of the Legislative Assembly of Western Australia for Beverley
- In office 22 March 1924 – 12 April 1930
- Preceded by: Frank Broun
- Succeeded by: James Mann
- In office 21 October 1914 – 29 September 1917
- Preceded by: Frank Broun
- Succeeded by: Frank Broun

Personal details
- Born: Charles Prangle Wansbrough; 6 October 1875 Perth, Western Australia, Australia
- Died: 12 May 1939 (aged 63) Beverley, Western Australia, Australia
- Party: Country

Charles Prangle Wansbrough (6 October 1875 – 12 May 1939) was an Australian farmer and politician who was a Country Party member of the Legislative Assembly of Western Australia from 1914 to 1917 and from 1924 to 1930, representing the seat of Beverley.

== Early life ==
Wansbrough was born in Perth to Matilda (née Massingham) and Joseph Wansbrough. He was raised in Beverley, where his parents were among the first settlers, and after leaving school farmed with his uncle at Kellerberrin for a period. Wansbrough later went to the Eastern Goldfields, and was involved with the discovery of gold at Mount Ida. In 1898, he and his brothers purchased a farming property at Bally Bally (near Beverley), of which he eventually became sole owner. Wansbrough was elected to the Beverley Road Board in 1906, and served for a number of years, including as chairman for a brief period. He was also prominent in agricultural circles, serving as a director of Westralian Farmers Ltd. (a co-operative).

== Politics ==
At the 1914 state election, Wansbrough was elected to parliament as the member for Beverley, replacing Frank Broun of the Liberal Party (who did not contest his seat). He left parliament after only a single term, with Broun (who had transferred to the Country Party) replacing him at the 1917 election. Broun left parliament again at the 1924 election, and Wansbrough replaced him. The Country Party had split into two rival factions the previous year, with Wansbrough representing the Executive faction (which opposed the government of Sir James Mitchell). He was re-elected at the 1927 election, but defeated by another Country candidate, James Mann, at the 1930 election. He attempted to re-claim his seat at the 1933 election, but was unsuccessful, again losing to Mann.

== Later life and family ==
Wansbrough died at his home in Beverley in May 1939, aged 63, after a long illness. He had married Ada Longhurst in 1904, with whom he had two sons and two daughters. Wansbrough's younger brother, Arthur Wansbrough, was also a member of parliament, representing the Labor Party in the seat of Albany. They served together from 1924 to 1930, and are the only brothers in the history of the Parliament of Western Australia to have represented different parties while sitting together.

Western Australian Legislative Assembly
Preceded by Frank Broun	Member for Beverley; 1924-1930	Succeeded by James Mann
Preceded by Frank Broun	Member for Beverley; 1914-1917	Succeeded by Frank Broun
