= Henry Brown (Australian politician) =

Australian politician

Member of the Legislative Assembly of Western Australia for Pingelly
- In office 22 March 1924 – 11 February 1933
- Preceded by: Henry Hickmott
- Succeeded by: Harrie Seward

Personal details
- Born: 25 December 1865 Victoria, Australia
- Died: 11 February 1933 (aged 67) Pingelly, Western Australia, Australia
- Party: Country

Henry James Brown (25 December 1865 – 11 February 1933) was an Australian farmer and politician who was a Country Party member of the Legislative Assembly of Western Australia from 1924 to 1933, representing the seat of Pingelly.

Brown was born in Swan Hill, Victoria, to Margaret (née Fanning) and Henry Brown. He came to Western Australia in 1893, buying a farm in Pingelly. Brown became president of the local agricultural society, and was also an inspector and land valuer for the Agricultural Bank of Western Australia. He served on the Pingelly Road Board from 1904 to 1916, including as chairman for a period. At the 1924 state election, Brown was one of seven Country Party candidates to stand for the seat of Pingelly, including the sitting member, Henry Hickmott. He polled only 16.5 percent of the first-preference vote, but finished with 57.7 percent of the two-party-preferred count, winning the seat. Brown was re-elected at the 1927 and 1930 elections, but died in office in February 1933, of a cerebral haemorrhage. No by-election was held due to the proximity of the 1933 state election. Brown had married Sarah Elizabeth Snow in 1897, with whom he had one son and eight daughters.

Parliament of Western Australia
Preceded by Henry Hickmott	Member for Pingelly; 1924–1933	Succeeded by Harrie Seward
