= Electoral district of Pingelly =

Former electoral district of Western Australia

Pingelly Western Australia—Legislative Assembly
- State: Western Australia
- Dates current: 1911–1950
- Namesake: Pingelly

Pingelly was an electoral district of the Legislative Assembly in the Australian state of Western Australia from 1911 to 1950.

The district was located in the Western Australia's Wheatbelt region, based on the town of Pingelly. Though won by the Liberal member for Beverley at its first contest at the 1911 state election, it became a reliable Country Party seat.

== Members for Pingelly ==
Member	Party	Term
Nat Harper	Liberal	1911–1914
Henry Hickmott	Country	1914–1923
Henry Hickmott	Country (ECP)	1923–1924
Henry Brown	Country	1924–1933
Harrie Seward	Country	1933–1950
