= 1930 Western Australian state election =

- 12 April 1930

All 50 seats in the Western Australian Legislative Assembly
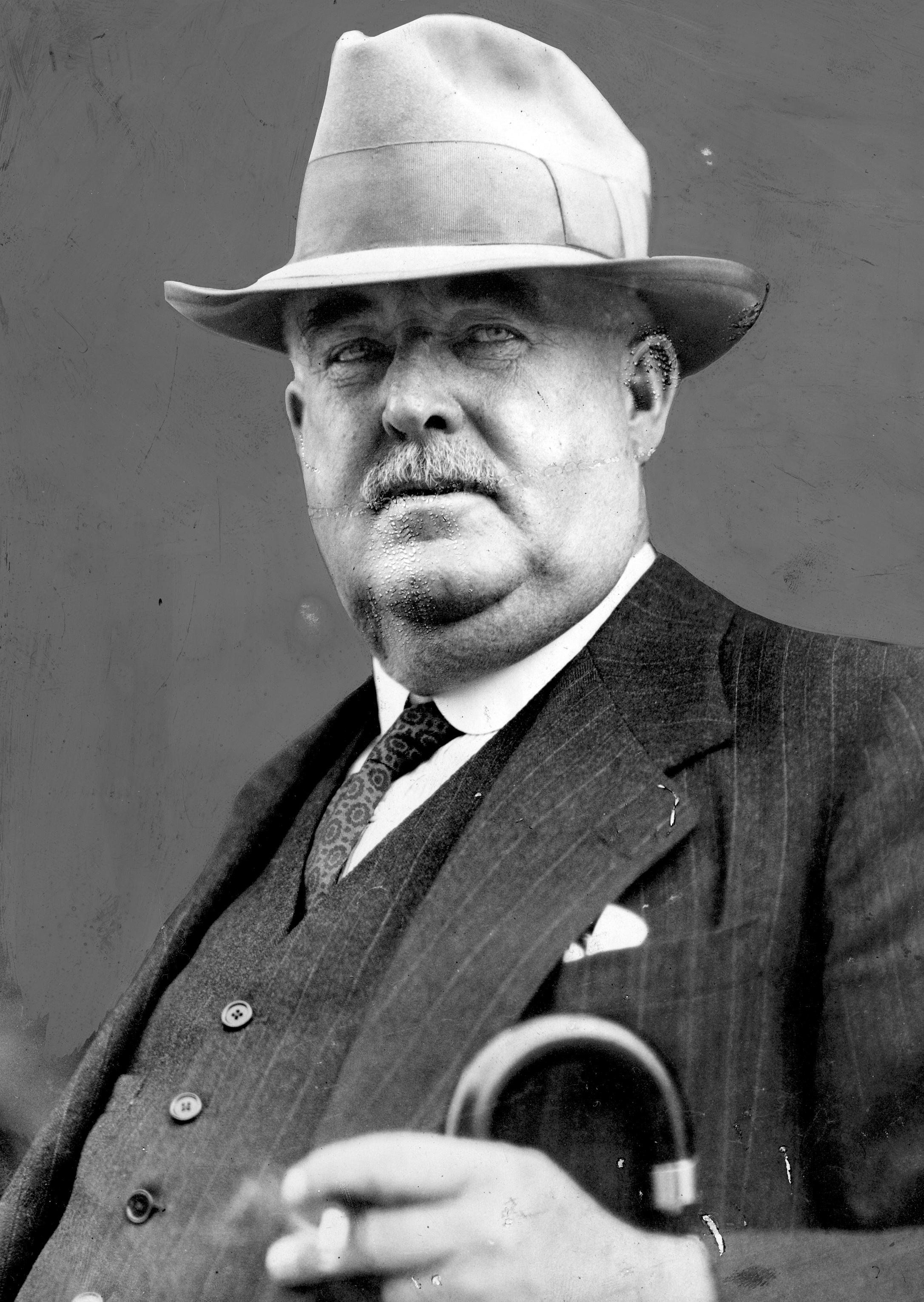

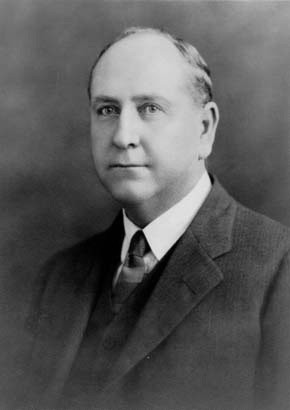
	First party	Second party
Leader	James Mitchell	Philip Collier
Party	Nationalist/Country coalition	Labor
Leader since	17 May 1919	16 April 1917
Leader's seat	Northam	Boulder
Last election	23 seats	27 seats
Seats won	26 seats	23 seats
Seat change	▲3	▼4
Percentage	54.95%	38.44%
Swing	▲2.13	▼6.89
Premier before election
Philip Collier
Labor
Elected Premier
James Mitchell
Nationalist/Country coalition

Elections were held in the state of Western Australia on 12 April 1930 to elect all 50 members to the Legislative Assembly. The incumbent Labor Party government, led by Premier Philip Collier, was defeated by the Nationalist-Country opposition, led by Opposition Leader James Mitchell.

== Results ==
Western Australian state election, 12 April 1930 Legislative Assembly << 1927–1933 >>
Enrolled voters	186,732^{[1]}				
Votes cast	139,013		Turnout	74.45%	+1.03%
Informal votes	1,579		Informal	1.14%	–0.26%
Summary of votes by party
Party	Primary votes	%	Swing	Seats	Change
Labor	52,824	38.44%	–6.89%	23	– 4
Nationalist	49,726	36.18%	–0.67%	16	± 0
Country	25,792	18.77%	+2.80%	10	+ 3
Independent Country	3,455	2.51%	*	1	+ 1
Independent	5,637	4.11%	+2.83%	0	± 0
Total	137,434			50	

^{1} 230,076 electors were enrolled to vote at the election, but 11 of the 50 seats were uncontested, with 43,344 electors enrolled in those seats.

== See also ==
- Candidates of the 1930 Western Australian state election
- Members of the Western Australian Legislative Assembly, 1927–1930
- Members of the Western Australian Legislative Assembly, 1930–1933
- First Collier Ministry
- Second Mitchell Ministry
