= 1924 Western Australian state election =

- 22 March 1924

All 50 seats in the Western Australian Legislative Assembly
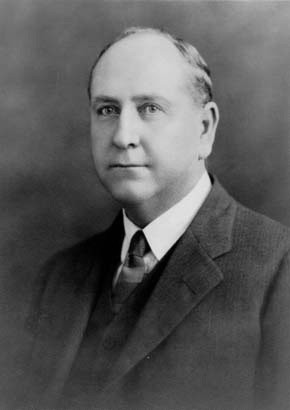

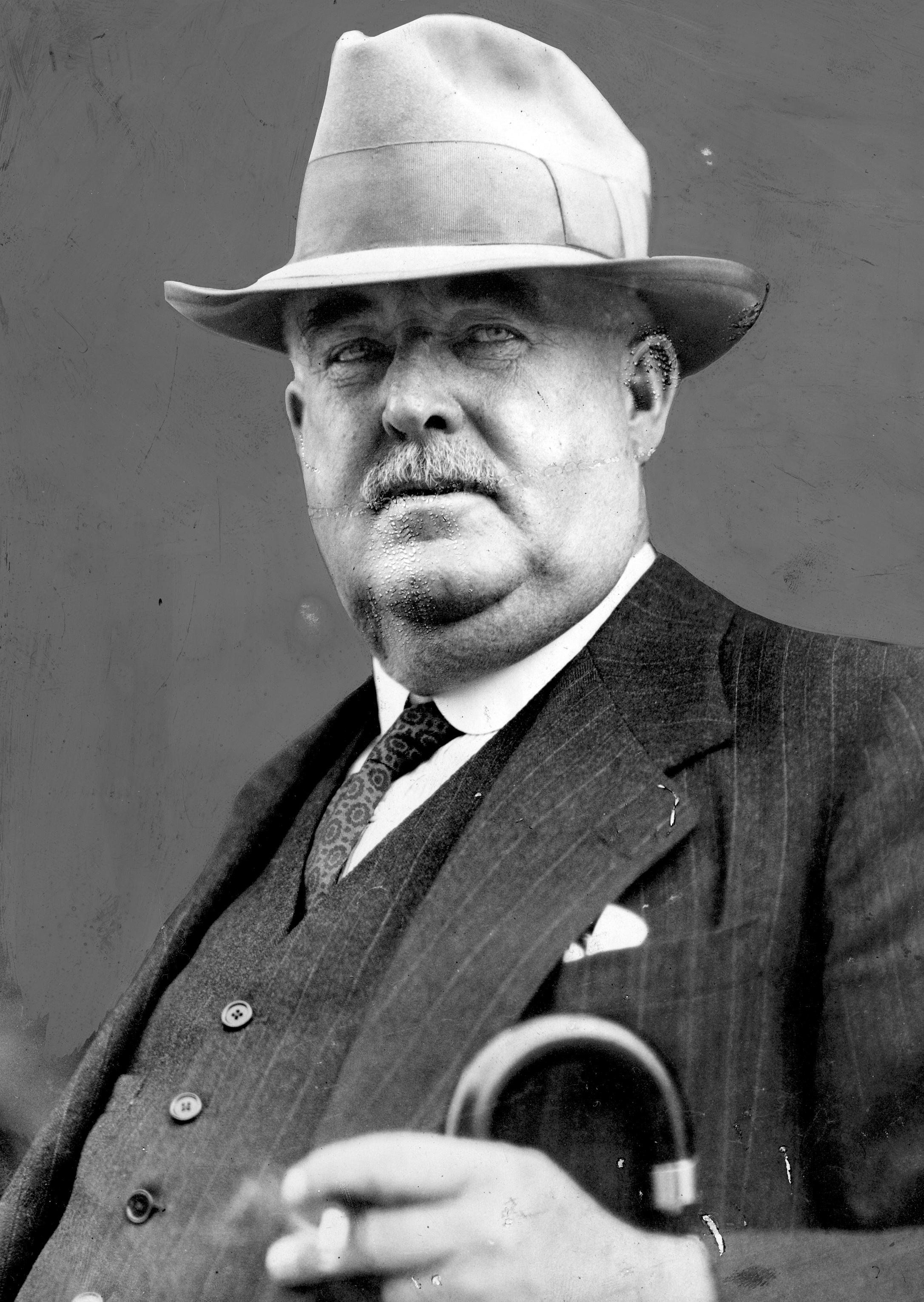
	First party	Second party	Third party
Leader	Philip Collier	James Mitchell	Alec Thomson
Party	Labor	Nationalist/Country coalition	Country
Leader since	16 April 1917	17 May 1919	1923
Leader's seat	Boulder	Northam	Katanning
Last election	17 seats	30 seats	-
Seats won	27 seats	17 seats	6 seats
Seat change	▲10	▼13	▲6
Percentage	40.39%	42.47%	12.08%
Swing	▲3.58	▼13.12	▲12.08
Premier before election
James Mitchell
Nationalist/Country coalition
Elected Premier
Philip Collier
Labor

Elections were held in the state of Western Australia on 22 March 1924 to elect all 50 members to the Legislative Assembly. The incumbent Nationalist-Majority Country government, led by Premier James Mitchell, was defeated by the Labor Party opposition, led by Opposition Leader Philip Collier.

== Results ==
Western Australian state election, 22 March 1924 Legislative Assembly << 1921–1927 >>
Enrolled voters	159,356^{[1]}				
Votes cast	99,391		Turnout	62.37%	–4.97%
Informal votes	1,151		Informal	1.16%	–0.48%
Summary of votes by party
Party	Primary votes	%	Swing	Seats	Change
Labor	39,679	40.39%	+3.58%	27	+ 10
Nationalist	25,282	25.73%	–2.00%	9	– 1
Majority Country	12,600	12.83%	–4.95%	7	– 9
Executive Country	11,872	12.08%	*	6	+ 6
National Labor	3,846	3.91%	–6.16%	1	– 3
Independent	4,426	4.51%	–3.09%	0	– 3
Other	535	0.54%	*	0	± 0
Total	98,240			50	

^{1} 189,869 electors were enrolled to vote at the election, but 12 of the 50 seats were uncontested, with 30,513 electors enrolled in those seats. Of these, 11 were held by Labor and 1 was held by the Nationalists.

- The Country Party had split in 1923 into Majority and Executive factions. The Majority faction supported the Nationalist party government, while the Executive faction sought a more independent way for the party.

== See also ==
- Candidates of the 1924 Western Australian state election
- Members of the Western Australian Legislative Assembly, 1921–1924
- Members of the Western Australian Legislative Assembly, 1924–1927
- First Collier Ministry
