= Electoral district of Beverley =

Former state electoral district of Western Australia

Beverley Western Australia—Legislative Assembly
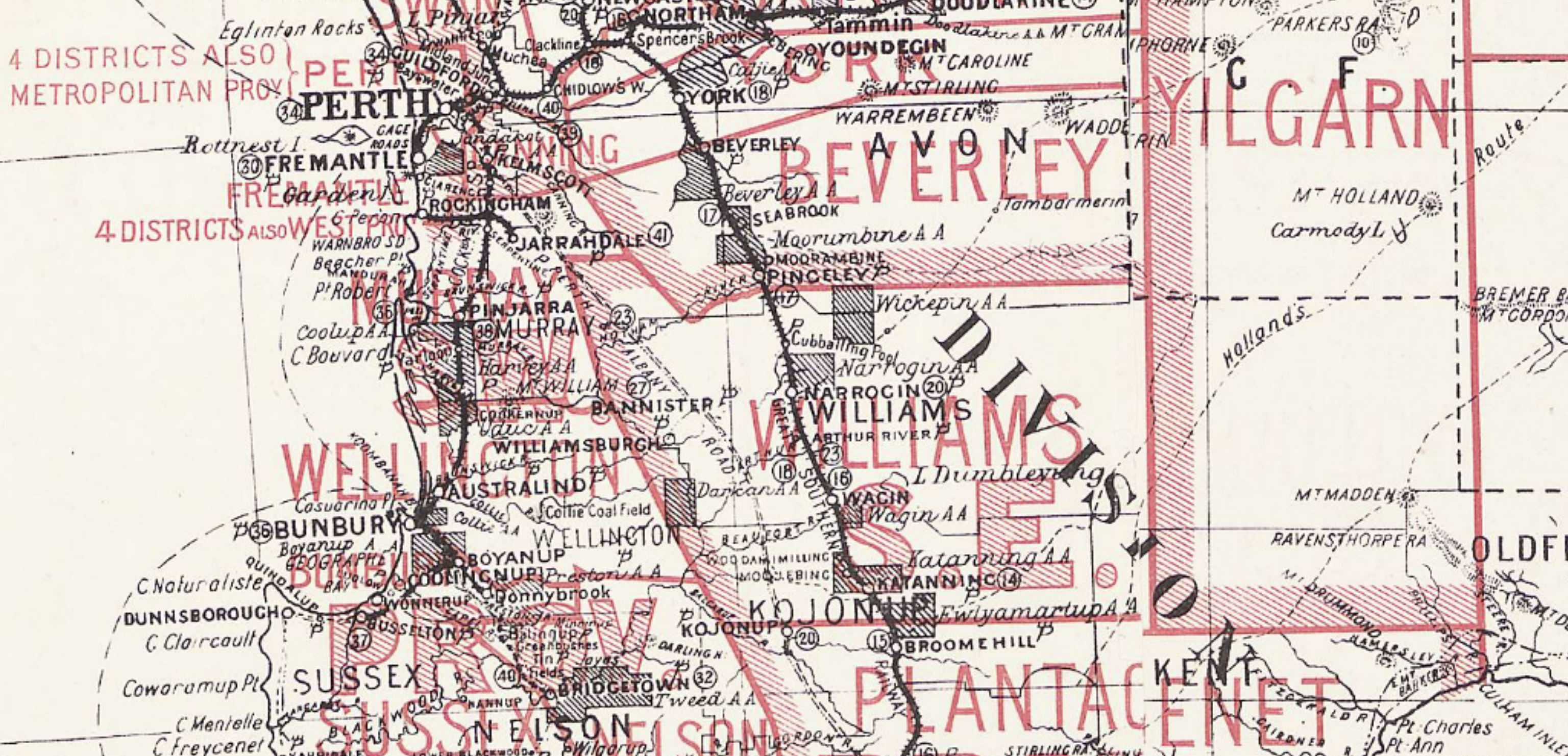
- Beverley and surrounding districts in 1898
- State: Western Australia
- Dates current: 1890–1950
- Namesake: Beverley

Beverley was an electoral district of the Legislative Assembly in the Australian state of Western Australia from 1890 to 1950.

The district was based on the rural town of Beverley lying to the east of Perth. It was one of the original 30 seats contested at the 1890 election. In 1898, it included Beverley and several other settlements along the Great Southern Railway, including Seabrook, Moorumbine, and Pingelly, as well as Narembeen farther west.

Beverley was abolished at the 1950 election; its final member, James Mann, was transferred to the seat of Avon Valley.

== Members ==
Member	Party	Term
Charles Harper	Ministerial	1890–1901
Charles Harper	Opposition	1901–1904
Charles Harper	Independent	1904–1905
Edmund Smith	Ministerial	1905–1908
John Hopkins	Ministerial	1908–1910
Nat Harper	Ministerial	1910–1911
Frank Broun	Liberal	1911–1914
Charles Wansbrough	Country	1914–1917
Frank Broun	Country	1917–1923
Frank Broun	Country (MCP)	1923–1924
Charles Wansbrough	Country (ECP)	1924–1930
James Mann	Country	1930–1949
James Mann	Independent	1949
James Mann	LCL	1949–1950
