= Results of the 1950 Western Australian state election (Legislative Assembly) =

Western Australian state election, 25 March 1950 Legislative Assembly << 1947–1953 >>
Enrolled voters	247,589				
Votes cast	229,298		Turnout	92.61%	+6.70%
Informal votes	4,534		Informal	1.98%	–0.07%
Summary of votes by party
Party	Primary votes	%	Swing	Seats	Change
Labor	94,055	41.85%		23	± 0
Liberal and Country	90,089	40.08%		15	+ 2
Country	20,922	9.31%		9	– 3
Ind. Lib.	5,059	2.25%		2	+ 1
Communist	815	0.36%		0	± 0
Independent	13,824	6.15%		1	± 0
Total	224,764			50	

This is a list of electoral district results of the 1950 Western Australian election.

== Results by electoral district ==
=== Albany ===
1950 Western Australian state election: Albany
Party	Candidate	Votes	%	±%
Country	Leonard Hill	2,112	44.0	
Labor	William Martin	1,962	40.8	
Liberal and Country	Alistair MacDonald	687	14.3	
Independent	James Bolitho	45	0.9	
Total formal votes		4,806	98.9	
Informal votes		52	1.1	
Turnout		4,858	94.3	
Two-party-preferred result
Country	Leonard Hill	2,742	57.0	
Labor	William Martin	2,064	43.0	
Country hold		Swing		

=== Avon Valley ===
1950 Western Australian state election: Avon Valley
Party	Candidate	Votes	%	±%
Liberal and Country	James Mann	2,135	56.5	
Country	Keith Halbert	994	26.3	
Country	Milford Smith	648	17.2	
Total formal votes		3,777	97.9	
Informal votes		79	2.1	
Turnout		3,856	93.8	
Liberal and Country hold		Swing		

- Preferences were not distributed.

=== Blackwood ===
1950 Western Australian state election: Blackwood
Party	Candidate	Votes	%	±%
Liberal and Country	John Hearman	1,503	34.5	
Independent	John Smith	1,149	26.3	
Labor	William Eastcott	981	22.5	
Country	Alwyn Wagner	727	16.7	
Total formal votes		4,360	98.4	
Informal votes		69	1.6	
Turnout		4,429	92.6	
Two-candidate-preferred result
Liberal and Country	John Hearman	2,284	52.4	
Independent	John Smith	2,076	47.6	
Liberal and Country hold		Swing		

=== Boulder ===
1950 Western Australian state election: Boulder
Party	Candidate	Votes	%	±%
Labor	Charlie Oliver	unopposed		
Labor hold		Swing		

=== Bunbury ===
1950 Western Australian state election: Bunbury
Party	Candidate	Votes	%	±%
Labor	Frank Guthrie	2,186	49.0	
Liberal and Country	James Murray	1,632	36.6	
Country	Percy Payne	645	14.4	
Total formal votes		4,463	99.1	
Informal votes		41	0.9	
Turnout		4,504	94.6	
Two-party-preferred result
Labor	Frank Guthrie	2,340	52.4	
Liberal and Country	James Murray	2,123	47.6	
Labor gain from Liberal and Country		Swing		

=== Canning ===
1950 Western Australian state election: Canning
Party	Candidate	Votes	%	±%
Liberal and Country	Arthur Griffith	3,793	46.8	
Labor	Alfred Reynolds	3,669	45.3	
Independent Country	Carlyle Ferguson	639	7.9	
Total formal votes		8,101	97.6	
Informal votes		197	2.4	
Turnout		8,298	90.9	
Two-party-preferred result
Liberal and Country	Arthur Griffith	4,274	52.8	
Labor	Alfred Reynolds	3,827	47.2	
Liberal and Country hold		Swing		

=== Claremont ===
1950 Western Australian state election: Claremont
Party	Candidate	Votes	%	±%
Liberal and Country	Charles North	unopposed		
Liberal and Country hold		Swing		

=== Collie ===
1950 Western Australian state election: Collie
Party	Candidate	Votes	%	±%
Labor	Harry May	unopposed		
Labor hold		Swing		

=== Cottesloe ===
1950 Western Australian state election: Cottesloe
Party	Candidate	Votes	%	±%
Liberal and Country	Ross Hutchinson	4,619	59.8	
Labor	John Vivian	3,103	41.2	
Total formal votes		7,722	99.0	
Informal votes		76	1.0	
Turnout		7,798	90.7	
Liberal and Country hold		Swing		

=== Dale ===
1950 Western Australian state election: Dale
Party	Candidate	Votes	%	±%
Liberal and Country	Gerald Wild	2,869	58.4	
Labor	Ronald Knowler	1,379	28.1	
Country	John Ellis	661	13.5	
Total formal votes		4,909	98.2	
Informal votes		89	1.8	
Turnout		4,998	90.9	
Two-party-preferred result
Liberal and Country	Gerald Wild		70.6	
Labor	Ronald Knowler		29.4	
Liberal and Country hold		Swing		

- Two party preferred vote was estimated.

=== Darling Range ===
1950 Western Australian state election: Darling Range
Party	Candidate	Votes	%	±%
Liberal and Country	Colin Cameron	1,696	35.8	
Country	Ray Owen	1,284	27.1	
Labor	John Rolinson	1,246	26.3	
Country	Frederick Schoch	509	10.7	
Total formal votes		4,735	97.9	
Informal votes		101	2.1	
Turnout		4,836	91.8	
Two-candidate-preferred result
Country	Ray Owen	2,524	53.3	
Liberal and Country	Colin Cameron	2,211	46.7	
Country hold		Swing		

=== East Perth ===
1950 Western Australian state election: East Perth
Party	Candidate	Votes	%	±%
Labor	Herb Graham	5,592	63.9	
Liberal and Country	Fred Book	3,160	36.1	
Total formal votes		8,752	98.4	
Informal votes		140	1.6	
Turnout		8,892	89.1	
Labor hold		Swing		

=== Eyre ===
1950 Western Australian state election: Eyre
Party	Candidate	Votes	%	±%
Labor	Emil Nulsen	2,110	71.1	
Liberal and Country	Roy Cunningham	858	28.9	
Total formal votes		2,968	97.6	
Informal votes		73	2.4	
Turnout		3,041	83.5	
Labor hold		Swing		

=== Fremantle ===
1950 Western Australian state election: Fremantle
Party	Candidate	Votes	%	±%
Labor	Joseph Sleeman	4,647	57.8	
Liberal and Country	Lennox Dickson	2,667	33.2	
Independent Labor	Kathleen Duff	539	6.7	
Communist	Kevin Healy	182	2.3	
Total formal votes		8,035	97.9	
Informal votes		176	2.1	
Turnout		8,211	89.9	
Two-party-preferred result
Labor	Joseph Sleeman		64.5	
Liberal and Country	Lennox Dickson		35.5	
Labor hold		Swing		

- Two party preferred vote was estimated.

=== Gascoyne ===
1950 Western Australian state election: Gascoyne
Party	Candidate	Votes	%	±%
Labor	Frank Wise	946	76.5	
Liberal and Country	Noel Butcher	290	23.5	
Total formal votes		1,236	97.2	
Informal votes		35	2.8	
Turnout		1,271	85.8	
Labor hold		Swing		

=== Geraldton ===
1950 Western Australian state election: Geraldton
Party	Candidate	Votes	%	±%
Labor	Bill Sewell	2,287	50.7	
Country	Edmund Hall	2,227	49.3	
Total formal votes		4,514	98.9	
Informal votes		50	1.1	
Turnout		4,564	90.4	
Labor gain from Country		Swing		

=== Greenough ===
1950 Western Australian state election: Greenough
Party	Candidate	Votes	%	±%
Liberal and Country	David Brand	unopposed		
Liberal and Country hold		Swing		

=== Guildford-Midland ===
1950 Western Australian state election: Guildford-Midland
Party	Candidate	Votes	%	±%
Labor	John Brady	4,931	58.5	
Liberal and Country	Irene Seaton	2,869	34.0	
Communist	Alexander Jolly	633	7.5	
Total formal votes		8,433	98.2	
Informal votes		152	1.8	
Turnout		8,585	92.9	
Two-party-preferred result
Labor	John Brady		65.2	
Liberal and Country	Irene Seaton		34.8	
Labor hold		Swing		

- Two party preferred vote was estimated.

=== Hannans ===
1950 Western Australian state election: Hannans
Party	Candidate	Votes	%	±%
Labor	Herbert McCulloch	2,487	61.5	
Liberal and Country	Frederick Hicks	1,560	38.5	
Total formal votes		4,047	97.9	
Informal votes		87	2.1	
Turnout		4,134	91.0	
Labor hold		Swing		

=== Harvey ===
1950 Western Australian state election: Harvey
Party	Candidate	Votes	%	±%
Liberal and Country	Iven Manning	2,048	48.9	
Labor	Robert McCallum	1,269	30.3	
Country	Walter Eckersley	868	20.7	
Total formal votes		4,185	98.7	
Informal votes		56	1.3	
Turnout		4,241	92.6	
Two-party-preferred result
Liberal and Country	Iven Manning	2,802	66.9	
Labor	Robert McCallum	1,383	33.1	
Liberal and Country hold		Swing		

=== Kalgoorlie ===
1950 Western Australian state election: Kalgoorlie
Party	Candidate	Votes	%	±%
Labor	Herbert Styants	2,513	67.0	
Liberal and Country	Albert Rogers	1,239	33.0	
Total formal votes		3,752	98.1	
Informal votes		72	1.9	
Turnout		3,824	86.5	
Labor hold		Swing		

=== Katanning ===
1950 Western Australian state election: Katanning
Party	Candidate	Votes	%	±%
Country	Crawford Nalder	2,957	73.9	
Country	Wilhelm Beeck	1,042	26.1	
Total formal votes		3,999	97.7	
Informal votes		93	2.3	
Turnout		4,092	91.7	
Country hold		Swing		

=== Kimberley ===
1950 Western Australian state election: Kimberley
Party	Candidate	Votes	%	±%
Labor	Aubrey Coverley	unopposed		
Labor hold		Swing		

=== Leederville ===
1950 Western Australian state election: Leederville
Party	Candidate	Votes	%	±%
Labor	Alexander Panton	3,997	52.1	
Liberal and Country	George Melville	3,675	47.9	
Total formal votes		7,672	98.1	
Informal votes		147	1.9	
Turnout		7,819	91.4	
Labor hold		Swing		

=== Maylands ===
1950 Western Australian state election: Maylands
Party	Candidate	Votes	%	±%
Independent	Harry Shearn	5,060	61.1	
Labor	John Gaffney	3,225	38.9	
Total formal votes		8,285	98.4	
Informal votes		134	1.6	
Turnout		8,419	92.3	
Independent hold		Swing		

=== Melville ===
1950 Western Australian state election: Melville
Party	Candidate	Votes	%	±%
Labor	John Tonkin	5,392	62.2	
Liberal and Country	Helen Brinkley	3,275	37.8	
Total formal votes		8,667	98.2	
Informal votes		158	1.8	
Turnout		8,825	93.3	
Labor hold		Swing		

=== Merredin-Yilgarn ===
1950 New South Wales state election: Merredin-Yilgarn
Party	Candidate	Votes	%	±%
Labor	Lionel Kelly	2,053	60.1	
Liberal and Country	Charles Davies	1,361	39.9	
Total formal votes		3,414	98.6	
Informal votes		48	1.4	
Turnout		3,462	90.4	
Labor hold		Swing		

=== Middle Swan ===
1950 Western Australian state election: Middle Swan
Party	Candidate	Votes	%	±%
Labor	James Hegney	4,480	53.1	
Liberal and Country	Henry Hawkins	3,955	46.9	
Total formal votes		8,435	97.9	
Informal votes		177	2.1	
Turnout		8,612	91.7	
Labor gain from Liberal and Country		Swing		

=== Moore ===
1950 Western Australian state election: Moore
Party	Candidate	Votes	%	±%
Country	John Ackland	unopposed		
Country hold		Swing		

=== Mount Hawthorn ===
1950 Western Australian state election: Mount Hawthorn
Party	Candidate	Votes	%	±%
Labor	Bill Hegney	4,680	54.1	
Liberal and Country	John Mann	3,725	43.1	
Independent Labor	John Plummer-Leitch	247	2.9	
Total formal votes		8,652	96.6	
Informal votes		301	3.4	
Turnout		8,953	92.7	
Two-party-preferred result
Labor	Bill Hegney		56.1	
Liberal and Country	John Mann		43.9	
Labor hold		Swing		

- Two party preferred vote was estimated.

=== Mount Lawley ===
1950 Western Australian state election: Mount Lawley
Party	Candidate	Votes	%	±%
Liberal and Country	Arthur Abbott	4,963	69.1	
Independent	James Collins	2,223	30.9	
Total formal votes		7,186	94.3	
Informal votes		430	5.7	
Turnout		7,616	89.9	
Liberal and Country hold		Swing		

=== Mount Marshall ===
1950 Western Australian state election: Mount Marshall
Party	Candidate	Votes	%	±%
Country	George Cornell	unopposed		
Country hold		Swing		

=== Murchison ===
1950 Western Australian state election: Murchison
Party	Candidate	Votes	%	±%
Labor	William Marshall	unopposed		
Labor hold		Swing		

=== Murray ===
1950 Western Australian state election: Murray
Party	Candidate	Votes	%	±%
Liberal and Country	Ross McLarty	2,719	62.1	
Labor	Charles Cross	1,662	37.9	
Total formal votes		4,381	98.7	
Informal votes		59	1.3	
Turnout		4,440	90.8	
Liberal and Country hold		Swing		

=== Narrogin ===
1950 Western Australian state election: Narrogin
Party	Candidate	Votes	%	±%
Country	Victor Doney	unopposed		
Country hold		Swing		

=== Nedlands ===
1950 Western Australian state election: Nedlands
Party	Candidate	Votes	%	±%
Liberal and Country	Cyril Bird	3,375	40.0	
Independent Liberal	David Grayden	2,856	33.9	
Liberal and Country	Norbert Keenan	1,962	23.3	
Independent Liberal	John Symonds	241	2.9	
Total formal votes		8,434	97.5	
Informal votes		216	2.5	
Turnout		8,650	89.5	
Two-candidate-preferred result
Independent Liberal	David Grayden	4,500	53.4	
Liberal and Country	Cyril Bird	3,934	46.6	
Independent Liberal gain from Liberal and Country		Swing		

=== North Perth ===
1950 Western Australian state election: North Perth
Party	Candidate	Votes	%	±%
Labor	Ted Needham	4,486	57.5	
Liberal and Country	Alfred Spencer	3,321	42.5	
Total formal votes		7,807	97.9	
Informal votes		165	2.1	
Turnout		7,972	90.4	
Labor gain from Liberal and Country		Swing		

=== Northam ===
1950 Western Australian state election: Northam
Party	Candidate	Votes	%	±%
Labor	Albert Hawke	3,123	65.6	
Country	Thomas Letch	1,635	34.4	
Total formal votes		4,758	98.7	
Informal votes		63	1.3	
Turnout		4,821	92.4	
Labor hold		Swing		

=== Pilbara ===
1950 Western Australian state election: Pilbara
Party	Candidate	Votes	%	±%
Labor	Alec Rodoreda	538	57.3	
Liberal and Country	Leonard Taplin	401	42.7	
Total formal votes		939	98.2	
Informal votes		17	1.8	
Turnout		956	77.2	
Labor hold		Swing		

=== Roe ===
1950 Western Australian state election: Roe
Party	Candidate	Votes	%	±%
Country	Harrie Seward	1,849	38.7	
Country	Charles Perkins	1,745	36.5	
Labor	Percy Munday	1,187	24.8	
Total formal votes		4,781	98.5	
Informal votes		72	1.5	
Turnout		4,853	90.7	
Two-candidate-preferred result
Country	Charles Perkins	2,538	53.1	
Country	Harrie Seward	2,243	46.9	
Country hold		Swing		

=== South Fremantle ===
1950 Western Australian state election: South Fremantle
Party	Candidate	Votes	%	±%
Labor	Thomas Fox	unopposed		
Labor hold		Swing		

=== South Perth ===
1950 Western Australian state election: South Perth
Party	Candidate	Votes	%	±%
Liberal and Country	George Yates	4,442	58.1	
Labor	Samuel Lynn	3,204	41.9	
Total formal votes		7,646	98.1	
Informal votes		147	1.9	
Turnout		7,793	91.7	
Liberal and Country hold		Swing		

=== Stirling ===
1950 Western Australian state election: Stirling
Party	Candidate	Votes	%	±%
Country	Arthur Watts	unopposed		
Country hold		Swing		

=== Subiaco ===
1950 Western Australian state election: Subiaco
Party	Candidate	Votes	%	±%
Liberal and Country	Florence Cardell-Oliver	5,072	62.2	
Labor	Thomas Henley	3,081	37.8	
Total formal votes		8,153	98.7	
Informal votes		107	1.3	
Turnout		8,260	91.6	
Liberal and Country hold		Swing		

=== Toodyay ===
1950 Western Australian state election: Toodyay
Party	Candidate	Votes	%	±%
Country	Lindsay Thorn	2,754	63.5	
Labor	Archibald McNess	1,580	36.5	
Total formal votes		4,334	98.0	
Informal votes		89	2.0	
Turnout		4,423	86.2	
Country hold		Swing		

=== Vasse ===
1950 Western Australian state election: Vasse
Party	Candidate	Votes	%	±%
Liberal and Country	William Bovell	2,996	64.8	
Country	Robert Leiper	1,625	35.2	
Total formal votes		4,621	98.0	
Informal votes		94	2.0	
Turnout		4,715	94.0	
Liberal and Country hold		Swing		

=== Victoria Park ===
1950 Western Australian state election: Victoria Park
Party	Candidate	Votes	%	±%
Independent	William Read	4,113	52.4	
Labor	Hugh Andrew	3,735	47.6	
Total formal votes		7,848	98.3	
Informal votes		134	1.7	
Turnout		7,982	91.5	
Independent hold		Swing		

=== Warren ===
1950 Western Australian state election: Warren
Party	Candidate	Votes	%	±%
Labor	Ernest Hoar	unopposed		
Labor hold		Swing		

=== Wembley Beaches ===
1950 Western Australian state election: Wembley Beaches
Party	Candidate	Votes	%	±%
Liberal and Country	Les Nimmo	4,830	62.5	
Labor	Richard Knox	2,899	37.5	
Total formal votes		7,729	98.4	
Informal votes		122	1.6	
Turnout		7,851	91.9	
Liberal and Country hold		Swing		

=== West Perth ===
1950 Western Australian state election: West Perth
Party	Candidate	Votes	%	±%
Liberal and Country	Joseph Totterdell	4,355	52.9	
Labor	Lucien Triat	3,425	41.6	
Independent	Frederick Swaine	448	5.4	
Total formal votes		8,228	97.4	
Informal votes		216	2.6	
Turnout		8,444	88.4	
Two-party-preferred result
Liberal and Country	Joseph Totterdell		55.7	
Labor	Lucien Triat		44.3	
Liberal and Country hold		Swing		

- Two party preferred vote was estimated.

== See also ==
- 1950 Western Australian state election
- Candidates of the 1950 Western Australian state election
- Members of the Western Australian Legislative Assembly, 1950–1953
