= Electoral results for the district of Maylands =

Western Australian district election results

This is a list of electoral results for the electoral district of Maylands in Western Australian state elections from the district's creation in 1948 until the present.

== Members for Maylands ==
Member	Party	Term
John Scaddan	Nationalist	1930–1933
Robert Clothier	Labor	1933–1936
Harry Shearn	Ind. Nationalist	1936–1951
Edward Oldfield	Liberal	1951–1956
Merv Toms	Labor	1956–1962
Edward Oldfield	Labor	1962–1965
Bob Marshall	Liberal	1965–1968
John Harman	Labor	1968–1986
Peter Dowding	Labor	1986–1990
Judy Edwards	Labor	1990–2008
Lisa Baker	Labor	2008–2025
Dan Bull	Labor	2025–present

== Election results ==
=== Elections in the 2020s ===
2025 Western Australian state election: Maylands
Party	Candidate	Votes	%	±%
Labor	Dan Bull	13,471	50.8	−11.3
Greens	Caroline Marisa Perks	6,056	22.8	+6.7
Liberal	Paula Tan	5,743	21.7	+6.1
Christians	Gaye Burnett	720	2.7	+0.9
Libertarian	Peter Cornish	534	2.0	+2.0
Total formal votes		26,524	96.3	−0.2
Informal votes		1,033	3.7	+0.2
Turnout		27,557	86.5	+3.5
Two-party-preferred result
Labor	Dan Bull	19,214	72.5	−6.9
Liberal	Paula Tan	7,305	27.5	+6.9
Labor hold		Swing	−6.9	

Results are not final. Last updated on 31 March 2025 at 6:30 PM AWST

2021 Western Australian state election: Maylands
Party	Candidate	Votes	%	±%
Labor	Lisa Baker	15,303	62.0	+12.2
Greens	Emma Pringle	3,985	16.1	−1.0
Liberal	Justin Iemma	3,848	15.6	−11.8
No Mandatory Vaccination	Carmel Addink	528	2.1	+2.1
Christians	Gaye Burnett	449	1.8	−0.2
One Nation	Maria Andreeva	339	1.4	+1.4
WAxit	Peter Baker	226	0.9	−0.5
Total formal votes		24,678	96.4	+1.3
Informal votes		918	3.6	−1.3
Turnout		25,596	86.1	+0.2
Two-party-preferred result
Labor	Lisa Baker	19,566	79.3	+11.5
Liberal	Justin Iemma	5,103	20.7	−11.5
Labor hold		Swing	+11.5	

=== Elections in the 2010s ===
2017 Western Australian state election: Maylands
Party	Candidate	Votes	%	±%
Labor	Lisa Baker	11,378	49.8	+7.8
Liberal	Amanda Madden	6,255	27.4	−15.8
Greens	Caroline Perks	3,920	17.1	+4.8
Matheson for WA	Greg Smith	539	2.4	+2.4
Christians	Matt Kleyn	453	2.0	−0.6
Micro Business	Benny Fensome	316	1.4	+1.4
Total formal votes		22,861	95.1	+1.6
Informal votes		1,171	4.9	−1.6
Turnout		24,032	86.8	+0.6
Two-party-preferred result
Labor	Lisa Baker	15,509	67.9	+15.2
Liberal	Amanda Madden	7,345	32.1	−15.2
Labor hold		Swing	+15.2	

2013 Western Australian state election: Maylands
Party	Candidate	Votes	%	±%
Liberal	Sylvan Albert	8,893	42.8	+8.7
Labor	Lisa Baker	8,796	42.3	–1.2
Greens	Dee O'Neill	2,554	12.3	–6.6
Christians	Paul Madden	533	2.6	–0.9
Total formal votes		20,776	93.5	−0.2
Informal votes		1,445	6.5	+0.2
Turnout		22,221	88.8	
Two-party-preferred result
Labor	Lisa Baker	11,020	53.1	–5.7
Liberal	Sylvan Albert	9,751	46.9	+5.7
Labor hold		Swing	–5.7	

=== Elections in the 2000s ===
2008 Western Australian state election: Maylands
Party	Candidate	Votes	%	±%
Labor	Lisa Baker	8,065	43.7	−10.8
Liberal	Ainslie Gatt	6,270	33.9	+7.4
Greens	Hsien Harper	3,524	19.1	+7.2
Christian Democrats	Dunstan Hartley	614	3.3	−0.4
Total formal votes		18,473	93.7	−0.6
Informal votes		1,241	6.3	+0.6
Turnout		19,714	84.7	
Two-party-preferred result
Labor	Lisa Baker	10,899	59.0	−8.4
Liberal	Ainslie Gatt	7,572	41.0	+8.4
Labor hold		Swing	−8.4	

2005 Western Australian state election: Maylands
Party	Candidate	Votes	%	±%
Labor	Judy Edwards	12,668	53.88	+3.27
Liberal	Roslyn Webb	6,464	27.49	–0.42
Greens	James Rayner	2,646	11.25	+2.83
Christian Democrats	Dunstan Hartley	921	3.92	+3.92
Family First	Judy Joyce	812	3.45	+3.45
Total formal votes		23,511	94.02	–0.23
Informal votes		1,496	5.98	+0.23
Turnout		25,007	89.60	+0.20
Two-party-preferred result
Labor	Judy Edwards	15,626	66.52	+2.04
Liberal	Roslyn Webb	7,863	33.48	–2.04
Labor hold		Swing	+2.04	

2001 Western Australian state election: Maylands
Party	Candidate	Votes	%	±%
Labor	Judy Edwards	10,549	50.6	+3.6
Liberal	Bev Brennan	5,818	27.9	−9.4
Greens	Corinne Glenn	1,755	8.4	−0.6
One Nation	Bill Goulthorp	1,209	5.8	+5.8
Democrats	Michael Phillips-Ryder	813	3.9	−2.8
Independent	Troy Ellis	441	2.1	+2.1
	Neil Gray	259	1.2	+1.2
Total formal votes		20,844	94.3	−0.3
Informal votes		1,271	5.7	+0.3
Turnout		22,115	89.4	
Two-party-preferred result
Labor	Judy Edwards	13,391	64.5	+7.4
Liberal	Bev Brennan	7,378	35.5	−7.4
Labor hold		Swing	+7.4	

=== Elections in the 1990s ===
1996 Western Australian state election: Maylands
Party	Candidate	Votes	%	±%
Labor	Judy Edwards	9,516	47.0	+0.6
Liberal	Bev Brennan	7,564	37.3	−3.1
Greens	Colin Speed	1,822	9.0	+3.2
Democrats	Pat Lim	1,361	6.7	+3.9
Total formal votes		20,263	94.6	−0.9
Informal votes		1,162	5.4	+0.9
Turnout		21,425	89.2	
Two-party-preferred result
Labor	Judy Edwards	11,549	57.1	+3.1
Liberal	Bev Brennan	8,678	42.9	−3.1
Labor hold		Swing	+3.1	

1993 Western Australian state election: Maylands
Party	Candidate	Votes	%	±%
Labor	Judy Edwards	9,605	50.0	−6.1
Liberal	Gary Lilleyman	7,097	36.9	+3.7
Greens	Robert Paton	1,230	6.4	+6.4
Democrats	Rosslyn Tilbury	708	3.7	+3.7
Independent	Noel Sharp	575	3.0	+2.0
Total formal votes		19,215	95.3	+4.5
Informal votes		957	4.7	−4.5
Turnout		20,172	93.1	+2.5
Two-party-preferred result
Labor	Judy Edwards	11,061	57.6	−2.5
Liberal	Gary Lilleyman	8,154	42.4	+2.5
Labor hold		Swing	−2.5	

1990 Maylands state by-election
Party	Candidate	Votes	%	±%
Labor	Judy Edwards	8,083	44.8	−11.8
Liberal	Deanne Koppman	6,586	36.5	+3.3
Greens	Bevan Carter	1,763	9.8	+9.8
Democrats	Robert Whitehead	584	3.2	+3.2
Grey Power	Josh Sacino	366	2.0	−2.4
Independent	Avon Lovell	292	1.6	+1.6
Independent	Roger Broinowski	109	0.6	+0.6
Independent	Barry Lloyd	87	0.5	+0.5
Independent	Jurgen Marter	61	0.3	+0.3
Independent	Paul Augustson	46	0.3	+0.3
Independent	Noel Sharp	36	0.2	+0.2
Independent	Arthur Galletly	12	0.1	+0.1
Total formal votes		18,025	96.0	+5.2
Informal votes		759	4.0	−5.2
Turnout		18,784	80.8	−9.8
Two-party-preferred result
Labor	Judy Edwards	10,017	55.6	−4.5
Liberal	Deanne Koppman	8,008	44.4	+4.5
Labor hold		Swing	−4.5	

=== Elections in the 1980s ===
1989 Western Australian state election: Maylands
Party	Candidate	Votes	%	±%
Labor	Peter Dowding	10,575	56.1	−6.2
Liberal	Peter Blaxell	6,255	33.2	+1.2
Grey Power	John Redmond	825	4.4	+4.4
Independent	Norman Heslington	593	3.2	+3.2
Family Movement	Brian Peachey	404	2.1	+2.1
Independent	Noel Sharp	195	1.0	+1.0
Total formal votes		18,847	90.8	
Informal votes		1,901	9.2	
Turnout		20,748	90.6	
Two-party-preferred result
Labor	Peter Dowding	11,335	60.1	−5.1
Liberal	Peter Blaxell	7,512	39.9	+5.1
Labor hold		Swing	−5.1	

1986 Western Australian state election: Maylands
Party	Candidate	Votes	%	±%
Labor	Peter Dowding	9,393	59.8	−5.1
Liberal	Michael MacAulay	4,728	30.1	−5.0
Independent	David MacLiver	855	5.4	+5.4
Democrats	Peter Hayes	474	3.0	+3.0
Independent	Clive Turner	141	0.9	+0.9
Independent	Michael Pal	127	0.8	+0.8
Total formal votes		15,718	96.1	−1.0
Informal votes		634	3.9	+1.0
Turnout		16,352	91.4	+4.6
Two-party-preferred result
Labor	Peter Dowding	10,547	67.1	+2.2
Liberal	Michael MacAulay	5,171	32.9	−2.2
Labor hold		Swing	+2.2	

1983 Western Australian state election: Maylands
Party	Candidate	Votes	%	±%
Labor	John Harman	9,169	64.9	
Liberal	Wouterina Klein	4,952	35.1	
Total formal votes		14,121	97.1	
Informal votes		420	2.9	
Turnout		14,541	86.8	
Labor hold		Swing		

1980 Western Australian state election: Maylands
Party	Candidate	Votes	%	±%
Labor	John Harman	8,454	60.2	+5.6
Liberal	John Urquhart	5,583	39.8	−5.6
Total formal votes		14,037	95.6	−0.7
Informal votes		650	4.4	+0.7
Turnout		14,687	86.5	−3.7
Labor hold		Swing	+5.6	

=== Elections in the 1970s ===
1977 Western Australian state election: Maylands
Party	Candidate	Votes	%	±%
Labor	John Harman	8,150	54.6	
Liberal	Brian Dillon	6,777	45.4	
Total formal votes		14,927	96.3	
Informal votes		569	3.7	
Turnout		15,496	90.2	
Labor hold		Swing		

1974 Western Australian state election: Maylands
Party	Candidate	Votes	%	±%
Labor	John Harman	8,530	61.1	
Liberal	Pauline Iles	4,494	32.2	
National Alliance	Edward Barlow	949	6.8	
Total formal votes		13,973	95.0	
Informal votes		730	5.0	
Turnout		14,703	89.0	
Two-party-preferred result
Labor	John Harman	8,672	62.1	
Liberal	Pauline Iles	5,301	37.9	
Labor hold		Swing		

1971 Western Australian state election: Maylands
Party	Candidate	Votes	%	±%
Labor	John Harman	6,687	58.4	+7.4
Liberal	Ross Trobe	3,952	34.5	−7.5
Democratic Labor	Francis Pownall	819	7.1	+2.7
Total formal votes		11,458	96.6	−1.0
Informal votes		404	3.4	+1.0
Turnout		11,862	90.4	−1.1
Two-party-preferred result
Labor	John Harman	6,810	59.4	+6.4
Liberal	Ross Trobe	4,648	40.6	−6.4
Labor hold		Swing	+6.4	

=== Elections in the 1960s ===
1968 Western Australian state election: Maylands
Party	Candidate	Votes	%	±%
Labor	John Harman	5,459	51.0	
Liberal and Country	Bob Marshall	4,491	42.0	
Democratic Labor	Francis Pownall	472	4.4	
Independent	Cornelis de Bruin	276	2.6	
Total formal votes		10,698	97.6	
Informal votes		264	2.4	
Turnout		10,962	91.5	
Two-party-preferred result
Labor	John Harman	5,668	53.0	
Liberal and Country	Bob Marshall	5,030	47.0	
Labor gain from Liberal and Country		Swing		

1965 Western Australian state election: Maylands
Party	Candidate	Votes	%	±%
Liberal and Country	Bob Marshall	4,849	48.6	+4.9
Labor	Edward Oldfield	4,631	46.4	−4.1
Democratic Labor	Francis Pownall	498	5.0	−0.9
Total formal votes		9,978	97.5	−1.0
Informal votes		254	2.5	+1.0
Turnout		10,232	93.3	−0.3
Two-party-preferred result
Liberal and Country	Bob Marshall	5,246	52.6	+4.0
Labor	Edward Oldfield	4,732	47.4	−4.0
Liberal and Country gain from Labor		Swing	+4.0	

1962 Western Australian state election: Maylands
Party	Candidate	Votes	%	±%
Labor	Edward Oldfield	5,109	50.5	
Liberal and Country	John Watts	4,419	43.7	
Democratic Labor	Gerard Lyons	594	5.9	
Total formal votes		10,122	98.5	
Informal votes		150	1.5	
Turnout		10,272	93.6	
Two-party-preferred result
Labor	Edward Oldfield		51.4	
Liberal and Country	John Watts		48.6	
Labor hold		Swing		

=== Elections in the 1950s ===
1959 Western Australian state election: Maylands
Party	Candidate	Votes	%	±%
Labor	Merv Toms	5,299	58.2	+1.8
Liberal and Country	Walter Bonnett	3,802	41.8	+18.6
Total formal votes		9,296	97.9	+0.2
Informal votes		195	2.1	−0.2
Turnout		9,296	93.5	+0.1
Labor hold		Swing	−0.3	

1956 Western Australian state election: Maylands
Party	Candidate	Votes	%	±%
Labor	Merv Toms	4,989	56.4	
Liberal and Country	Ellen Lulham	2,050	23.2	
Independent Liberal	Herbert R. Robinson	1,803	20.4	
Total formal votes		8,842	97.7	
Informal votes		206	2.3	
Turnout		9,048	93.4	
Two-party-preferred result
Labor	Merv Toms		58.5	
Liberal and Country	Ellen Lulham		41.5	
Labor gain from Liberal and Country		Swing		

- Two party preferred vote was estimated.

1953 Western Australian state election: Maylands
Party	Candidate	Votes	%	±%
Labor	Owen Hanlon	3,920	46.3	+4.6
Liberal and Country	Edward Oldfield	3,586	42.4	+3.0
Independent	Samuel Spence	959	11.3	−6.4
Total formal votes		8,465	97.9	+0.4
Informal votes		181	2.1	−0.4
Turnout		8,646	94.5	+3.9
Two-party-preferred result
Liberal and Country	Edward Oldfield	4,292	50.7	−2.3
Labor	Owen Hanlon	4,173	49.3	+2.3
Liberal and Country hold		Swing	−2.3	

1951 Maylands state by-election
Party	Candidate	Votes	%	±%
Labor	Robert Hartley	3,316	41.7	+2.8
Liberal and Country	Edward Oldfield	3,180	39.4	+39.4
Independent	Samuel Spence	1,427	17.7	+17.7
Independent Socialist	Kevin Healy	96	1.2	+1.2
Total formal votes		8,064	97.5	−0.9
Informal votes		205	2.5	+0.9
Turnout		8,269	90.6	−1.7
Two-party-preferred result
Liberal and Country	Edward Oldfield	4,278	53.0	+53.0
Labor	Robert Hartley	3,786	47.0	+8.1
Liberal and Country gain from Independent		Swing	N/A	

1950 Western Australian state election: Maylands
Party	Candidate	Votes	%	±%
Independent	Harry Shearn	5,060	61.1	
Labor	John Gaffney	3,225	38.9	
Total formal votes		8,285	98.4	
Informal votes		134	1.6	
Turnout		8,419	92.3	
Independent hold		Swing		

=== Elections in the 1940s ===
1947 Western Australian state election: Maylands
Party	Candidate	Votes	%	±%
Independent Liberal	Harry Shearn	unopposed		
Independent Liberal hold		Swing		

1943 Western Australian state election: Maylands
Party	Candidate	Votes	%	±%
Ind. Nationalist	Harry Shearn	4,342	55.0	−9.2
Labor	Roderick Hough	2,178	27.6	−8.2
Communist	Clarence Boyd	713	9.0	+9.0
Independent	John Walton	346	4.4	+4.4
Independent	Jessie Reid	314	4.0	+4.0
Total formal votes		7,893	97.0	−1.6
Informal votes		245	3.0	+1.6
Turnout		8,138	88.8	−2.9
Ind. Nationalist hold		Swing	N/A	

- Preferences were not distributed.

=== Elections in the 1930s ===
1939 Western Australian state election: Maylands
Party	Candidate	Votes	%	±%
Ind. Nationalist	Harry Shearn	4,966	64.2	+35.2
Labor	Robert Hartley	2,764	35.8	−3.6
Total formal votes		7,730	98.6	−0.5
Informal votes		112	1.4	+0.5
Turnout		7,842	91.7	+17.6
Ind. Nationalist hold		Swing	+8.1	

1936 Western Australian state election: Maylands
Party	Candidate	Votes	%	±%
Labor	Robert Clothier	2,214	39.4	−3.4
Ind. Nationalist	Harry Shearn	1,630	29.0	+29.0
Nationalist	Tom Hartrey	921	16.4	+16.4
Nationalist	Arthur Daley	861	15.3	+15.3
Total formal votes		5,626	99.1	+1.0
Informal votes		52	0.9	−1.0
Turnout		5,678	74.1	−17.1
Two-candidate-preferred result
Ind. Nationalist	Harry Shearn	3,158	56.1	+56.1
Labor	Robert Clothier	2,468	43.9	−11.2
Ind. Nationalist gain from Labor		Swing	N/A	

1933 Western Australian state election: Maylands
Party	Candidate	Votes	%	±%
Labor	Robert Clothier	2,721	42.8	+1.1
Nationalist	John Scaddan	1,652	26.0	−5.7
Nationalist	Arthur Daley	1,203	18.9	−5.0
Nationalist	Charles Plunkett	675	10.6	+10.6
Independent	Frederick Swaine	106	1.7	+1.7
Total formal votes		6,357	98.1	−0.8
Informal votes		123	1.9	+0.8
Turnout		6,480	91.2	+11.9
Two-party-preferred result
Labor	Robert Clothier	3,505	55.1	+9.4
Nationalist	John Scaddan	2,852	44.9	−9.4
Labor gain from Nationalist		Swing	+9.4	

1930 Western Australian state election: Maylands
Party	Candidate	Votes	%	±%
Labor	Ernest Barker	2,211	41.7	
Nationalist	John Scaddan	1,681	31.7	
Nationalist	Arthur Daley	1,269	23.9	
Nationalist	Peter Wedd	144	2.7	
Total formal votes		5,305	98.9	
Informal votes		60	1.1	
Turnout		5,365	79.3	
Two-party-preferred result
Nationalist	John Scaddan	2,879	54.3	
Labor	Ernest Barker	2,426	45.7	
Nationalist hold		Swing		
