= Results of the 1947 Western Australian state election (Legislative Assembly) =

== Overall results ==
Western Australian state election, 15 March 1947 Legislative Assembly << 1943–1950 >>
Enrolled voters	194,270^{[1]}				
Votes cast	166,905		Turnout	85.91%	–0.63%
Informal votes	3,415		Informal	2.05%	–0.43%
Summary of votes by party
Party	Primary votes	%	Swing	Seats	Change
Labor	61,059	37.35%	–5.93%	23	– 7
Liberal	57,621	35.24%	+10.96%	13	+ 6
Country and Democratic League	26,416	16.16%	+3.74%	12	+ 2
West Australia Party	556	0.34%	*	0	0
Independent Labor	3,318	2.03%	–0.64%	0	0
Independent Liberal	2,321	1.42%	+0.54%	0	0
Communist	1,641	1.00%	+0.60%	0	0
Progressive	89	0.05%	+0.05%	0	± 0
Independent	10,469	6.4%	–2.61%	1	± 0
Independent Nationalists	0	0.00%	-2.96%	1	0
Total	163,490			50	

== Results by electoral district ==
This is a list of electoral district results of the 1947 Western Australian election.

=== Albany ===
1947 Western Australian state election: Albany
Party	Candidate	Votes	%	±%
Country	Leonard Hill	2,141	49.6	−5.0
Labor	William Martin	2,090	48.4	+3.0
Progressive (WA)	Egbert Shenton	89	2.1	+2.1
Total formal votes		4,320	99.2	+1.0
Informal votes		33	0.8	−1.0
Turnout		4,353	91.3	+7.7
Two-party-preferred result
Country	Leonard Hill	2,195	50.8	−3.8
Labor	William Martin	2,125	49.2	+3.8
Country hold		Swing	−3.8	

=== Avon ===
1947 Western Australian state election: Avon
Party	Candidate	Votes	%	±%
Country	George Cornell	1,529	50.7	+1.0
Labor	William Telfer	1,487	49.3	−1.0
Total formal votes		3,016	98.8	+1.0
Informal votes		38	1.2	−1.0
Turnout		3,054	85.7	−1.9
Country gain from Labor		Swing	+1.0	

=== Beverley ===
1947 Western Australian state election: Beverley
Party	Candidate	Votes	%	±%
Country	James Mann	2,260	76.0	+16.4
Independent	John Wilkinson	713	24.0	+15.8
Total formal votes		2,973	98.3	−0.2
Informal votes		52	1.7	+0.2
Turnout		3,025	84.0	−2.1
Country hold		Swing	N/A	

=== Boulder ===
1947 Western Australian state election: Boulder
Party	Candidate	Votes	%	±%
Labor	Philip Collier	unopposed		
Labor hold		Swing		

=== Brown Hill-Ivanhoe ===
1947 Western Australian state election: Brown Hill-Ivanhoe
Party	Candidate	Votes	%	±%
Labor	Frederick Smith	unopposed		
Labor hold		Swing		

=== Bunbury ===
1947 Western Australian state election: Bunbury
Party	Candidate	Votes	%	±%
Labor	John Kirke	2,370	45.4	−10.1
Liberal	James Murray	1,517	29.0	+29.0
Country	Albert Scott	1,338	25.6	−18.9
Total formal votes		5,225	98.7	+0.5
Informal votes		69	1.3	−0.5
Turnout		5,294	90.9	+5.1
Two-party-preferred result
Liberal	James Murray	2,658	50.9	+6.4
Labor	John Kirke	2,567	49.1	−6.4
Liberal gain from Labor		Swing	+6.4	

=== Canning ===
1947 Western Australian state election: Canning
Party	Candidate	Votes	%	±%
Liberal	George Yates	7,278	56.0	+25.6
Labor	Charles Cross	5,714	44.0	−6.1
Total formal votes		12,992	96.9	+0.2
Informal votes		388	3.1	−0.2
Turnout		13,380	87.1	−1.4
Liberal gain from Labor		Swing	N/A	

=== Claremont ===
1947 Western Australian state election: Claremont
Party	Candidate	Votes	%	±%
Liberal	Charles North	5,092	65.0	+31.6
Labor	William Carmody	2,736	35.0	+2.0
Total formal votes		7,828	98.6	+1.1
Informal votes		107	1.4	−1.1
Turnout		7,935	87.7	−4.1
Liberal hold		Swing	N/A	

=== Collie ===
1947 Western Australian state election: Collie
Party	Candidate	Votes	%	±%
Labor	Harry May	unopposed		
Labor hold		Swing		

=== East Perth ===
1947 Western Australian state election: East Perth
Party	Candidate	Votes	%	±%
Labor	Herb Graham	3,731	57.8	−42.2
Independent Liberal	James Collins	2,321	36.0	+36.0
Communist	Henry Mountjoy	398	6.2	+6.2
Total formal votes		6,450	96.9	
Informal votes		209	3.1	
Turnout		6,659	86.9	
Labor hold		Swing	N/A	

- Preferences were not distributed.

=== Forrest ===
1947 Western Australian state election: Forrest
Party	Candidate	Votes	%	±%
Labor	Alfred Reynolds	1,572	48.9	−51.1
Liberal	David Johnstone	1,209	37.6	+37.6
Country	Keith Porteous	437	13.6	+13.6
Total formal votes		3,218	98.0	
Informal votes		65	2.0	
Turnout		3,283	81.8	
Two-party-preferred result
Labor	Alfred Reynolds	1,644	51.1	−48.9
Liberal	David Johnstone	1,574	48.9	+48.9
Labor hold		Swing	N/A	

=== Fremantle ===
1947 Western Australian state election: Fremantle
Party	Candidate	Votes	%	±%
Labor	Joseph Sleeman	unopposed		
Labor hold		Swing		

=== Gascoyne ===
1947 Western Australian state election: Gascoyne
Party	Candidate	Votes	%	±%
Labor	Frank Wise	unopposed		
Labor hold		Swing		

=== Geraldton ===
1947 Western Australian state election: Geraldton
Party	Candidate	Votes	%	±%
Labor	Bill Sewell	1,874	47.7	−22.7
Country	Edmund Hall	1,154	29.4	+29.4
Liberal	Harold Daffen	903	23.0	+23.0
Total formal votes		3,931	99.2	+1.2
Informal votes		32	0.8	−1.2
Turnout		3,963	87.7	+0.9
Two-party-preferred result
Country	Edmund Hall	1,971	50.1	+50.1
Labor	Bill Sewell	1,960	49.9	−20.5
Country gain from Labor		Swing	N/A	

=== Greenough ===
1947 Western Australian state election: Greenough
Party	Candidate	Votes	%	±%
Liberal	David Brand	2,601	66.9	+66.9
Labor	Thomas Shanahan	1,286	33.1	−19.7
Total formal votes		3,887	99.1	+0.5
Informal votes		34	0.9	−0.5
Turnout		3,921	82.6	+1.7
Liberal gain from Labor		Swing	+19.7	

- The Liberal candidate David Brand had won the seat from Labor at the 1945 Greenough state by-election.

=== Guildford-Midland ===
1947 Western Australian state election: Guildford-Midland
Party	Candidate	Votes	%	±%
Labor	William Johnson	3,058	46.5	−7.1
Liberal	Arthur Thompson	2,272	34.6	+34.6
Communist	Alexander Jolly	1,243	18.9	+18.9
Total formal votes		6,573	97.8	+0.1
Informal votes		150	2.2	−0.1
Turnout		6,723	86.8	−3.4
Two-party-preferred result
Labor	William Johnson	3,826	58.2	
Liberal	Arthur Thompson	2,747	41.8	
Labor hold		Swing	N/A	

=== Hannans ===
1947 Western Australian state election: Hannans
Party	Candidate	Votes	%	±%
Labor	David Leahy	unopposed		
Labor hold		Swing		

=== Irwin-Moore ===
1947 Western Australian state election: Irwin-Moore
Party	Candidate	Votes	%	±%
Country	John Ackland	1,443	52.3	+38.6
Labor	Luke Travers	660	23.9	+2.6
Independent	Horace Berry	658	23.8	−31.9
Total formal votes		2,761	99.2	+0.8
Informal votes		23	0.8	−0.8
Turnout		2,784	80.3	−1.4
Country gain from Independent		Swing	N/A	

- Preferences were not distributed.

=== Kalgoorlie ===
1947 Western Australian state election: Kalgoorlie
Party	Candidate	Votes	%	±%
Labor	Herbert Styants	unopposed		
Labor hold		Swing		

=== Kanowna ===
1947 Western Australian state election: Kanowna
Party	Candidate	Votes	%	±%
Labor	Emil Nulsen	unopposed		
Labor hold		Swing		

=== Katanning ===
1947 Western Australian state election: Katanning
Party	Candidate	Votes	%	±%
Country	Arthur Watts	3,682	78.3	+6.2
Labor	John Powell	1,018	21.7	+21.7
Total formal votes		4,700	98.7	+0.3
Informal votes		62	1.3	−0.3
Turnout		4,762	89.8	+4.9
Country hold		Swing	N/A	

=== Kimberley ===
1947 Western Australian state election: Kimberley
Party	Candidate	Votes	%	±%
Labor	Aubrey Coverley	389	65.3	−12.0
Independent	Kimberley Durack	207	34.7	+34.7
Total formal votes		596	98.5	+0.8
Informal votes		9	1.5	−0.8
Turnout		605	70.2	−4.7
Labor hold		Swing	N/A	

=== Leederville ===
1947 Western Australian state election: Leederville
Party	Candidate	Votes	%	±%
Labor	Alexander Panton	unopposed		
Labor hold		Swing		

=== Maylands ===
1947 Western Australian state election: Maylands
Party	Candidate	Votes	%	±%
Independent Liberal	Harry Shearn	unopposed		
Independent Liberal hold		Swing		

=== Middle Swan ===
1947 Western Australian state election: Middle Swan
Party	Candidate	Votes	%	±%
Labor	James Hegney	4,933	47.1	−2.0
Liberal	Bill Grayden	4,180	39.9	+12.6
Country	Mary Hamersley	1,370	13.1	+13.1
Total formal votes		10,483	97.9	+0.6
Informal votes		220	2.1	−0.6
Turnout		10,703	85.1	+0.6
Two-party-preferred result
Liberal	Bill Grayden	5,267	50.2	+8.3
Labor	James Hegney	5,216	49.8	−8.3
Liberal gain from Labor		Swing	+8.3	

=== Mount Hawthorn ===
1947 Western Australian state election: Mount Hawthorn
Party	Candidate	Votes	%	±%
Liberal	Les Nimmo	5,594	45.3	+12.0
Labor	William Beadle	5,400	43.8	−22.9
Independent	Archibald Cruikshank	920	7.5	+7.5
Country	Norman Hard	281	2.3	+2.3
	Arthur West	145	1.2	+1.2
Total formal votes		12,340	96.3	−0.7
Informal votes		479	3.7	+0.7
Turnout		12,819	85.6	−3.1
Two-party-preferred result
Liberal	Les Nimmo	6,313	51.2	+17.9
Labor	William Beadle	6,027	48.8	−17.9
Liberal gain from Labor		Swing	+17.9	

=== Mount Magnet ===
1947 Western Australian state election: Mount Magnet
Party	Candidate	Votes	%	±%
Labor	Lucien Triat	unopposed		
Labor hold		Swing		

=== Mount Marshall ===
1947 Western Australian state election: Mount Marshall
Party	Candidate	Votes	%	±%
Country	Hugh Leslie	unopposed		
Country hold		Swing		

=== Murchison ===
1947 Western Australian state election: Murchison
Party	Candidate	Votes	%	±%
Labor	William Marshall	unopposed		
Labor hold		Swing		

=== Murray-Wellington ===
1947 Western Australian state election: Murray-Wellington
Party	Candidate	Votes	%	±%
Liberal	Ross McLarty	unopposed		
Liberal hold		Swing		

=== Nedlands ===
1947 Western Australian state election: Nedlands
Party	Candidate	Votes	%	±%
Liberal	Norbert Keenan	9,210	73.5	+1.4
Independent Labor	William Williams	3,318	26.5	+26.5
Total formal votes		12,528	97.9	+0.5
Informal votes		264	2.1	−0.5
Turnout		12,792	82.6	−1.9
Liberal hold		Swing	N/A	

=== Nelson ===
1947 Western Australian state election: Nelson
Party	Candidate	Votes	%	±%
Labor	Ernest Hoar	3,173	59.0	+8.8
Liberal	Edward Cummins	2,204	41.0	−8.8
Total formal votes		5,377	98.9	+0.7
Informal votes		62	1.1	−0.7
Turnout		5,439	85.9	+2.3
Labor hold		Swing	+8.8	

=== Northam ===
1947 Western Australian state election: Northam
Party	Candidate	Votes	%	±%
Labor	Albert Hawke	2,245	56.2	−13.7
Country	Norm Baxter	1,753	43.8	+13.7
Total formal votes		3,998	98.7	+0.3
Informal votes		53	1.3	−0.3
Turnout		4,051	80.0	−5.4
Labor hold		Swing	+13.7	

=== North Perth ===
1947 Western Australian state election: North Perth
Party	Candidate	Votes	%	±%
Liberal	Arthur Abbott	3,308	60.0	+19.6
Labor	William Deal	2,203	40.0	−2.5
Total formal votes		5,511	97.7	+0.8
Informal votes		127	2.3	−0.8
Turnout		5,638	87.3	−7.9
Liberal hold		Swing	+6.1	

=== North-East Fremantle ===
1947 Western Australian state election: North-East Fremantle
Party	Candidate	Votes	%	±%
Labor	John Tonkin	unopposed		
Labor hold		Swing		

=== Perth ===
1947 Western Australian state election: Perth
Party	Candidate	Votes	%	±%
Labor	Ted Needham	3,418	52.7	−6.7
Liberal	Stanley Perry	2,507	38.7	+17.1
Independent	Carlyle Ferguson	556	8.6	+8.6
Total formal votes		6,481	96.8	+0.4
Informal votes		214	3.2	−0.4
Turnout		6,695	86.1	−0.6
Labor hold		Swing	N/A	

- Preferences were not distributed.

=== Pilbara ===
1947 Western Australian state election: Pilbara
Party	Candidate	Votes	%	±%
Labor	Bill Hegney	235*	50.1	−14.6
Independent	Leonard Taplin	234	49.9	+49.9
Total formal votes		468	97.5	+0.8
Informal votes		12	2.5	−0.8
Turnout		480	73.6	−5.3
Labor hold		Swing	N/A	

- Includes the casting vote of the returning officer. The result was challenged and resulted in the 1947 Pilbara state by-election.

=== Pingelly ===
1947 Western Australian state election: Pingelly
Party	Candidate	Votes	%	±%
Country	Harrie Seward	2,108	70.2	+2.4
Independent	Percy Munday	896	29.8	−2.4
Total formal votes		3,004	98.9	+0.2
Informal votes		34	1.1	−0.2
Turnout		3,038	77.6	−2.6
Country hold		Swing	+2.4	

=== Roebourne ===
1947 Western Australian state election: Roebourne
Party	Candidate	Votes	%	±%
Labor	Alec Rodoreda	unopposed		
Labor hold		Swing		

=== South Fremantle ===
1947 Western Australian state election: South Fremantle
Party	Candidate	Votes	%	±%
Labor	Thomas Fox	unopposed		
Labor hold		Swing		

=== Subiaco ===
1947 Western Australian state election: Subiaco
Party	Candidate	Votes	%	±%
Liberal	Florence Cardell-Oliver	4,450	62.7	+4.0
Labor	Percival Potter	2,651	37.3	−4.0
Total formal votes		7,101	98.2	+0.7
Informal votes		129	1.8	−0.7
Turnout		7,230	90.6	−3.2
Liberal hold		Swing	+4.0	

=== Sussex ===
1947 Western Australian state election: Sussex
Party	Candidate	Votes	%	±%
Liberal	William Willmott	2,531	64.3	+2.0
Labor	Robert Hearne	1,407	35.7	−2.0
Total formal votes		3,938	98.9	+1.0
Informal votes		44	1.1	−1.0
Turnout		3,982	87.2	−0.1
Liberal hold		Swing	+2.0	

=== Swan ===
1947 Western Australian state election: Swan
Party	Candidate	Votes	%	±%
Liberal	Gerald Wild	2,765	44.8	+44.8
Independent	Ray Owen	2,653	43.0	+43.0
Country	Edward Parker	751	12.2	−50.5
Total formal votes		6,169	97.0	+0.6
Informal votes		193	3.0	−0.6
Turnout		6,362	85.4	−7.6
Two-candidate-preferred result
Liberal	Gerald Wild	3,135	50.8	+50.8
Independent	Ray Owen	3,034	49.2	+49.2
Liberal gain from Country		Swing	N/A	

- Swan was won in a by-election by Independent candidate Ray Owen upon the death of sitting Country member Richard Sampson.

=== Toodyay ===
1947 Western Australian state election: Toodyay
Party	Candidate	Votes	%	±%
Country	Lindsay Thorn	unopposed		
Country hold		Swing		

=== Victoria Park ===
1947 Western Australian state election: Victoria Park
Party	Candidate	Votes	%	±%
Independent	William Read	4,939	55.1	+55.1
Labor	Charles Johnson	4,024	44.9	−21.3
Total formal votes		8,963	98.1	+0.7
Informal votes		171	1.9	−0.7
Turnout		9,134	88.9	−2.4
Independent gain from Labor		Swing	N/A	

- Victoria Park was won by the Independent member William Read at the 1945 by-election upon the death of the sitting Labor member Howard Stirling.

=== Wagin ===
1947 Western Australian state election: Wagin
Party	Candidate	Votes	%	±%
Country	Crawford Nalder	928	26.6	+26.6
Labor	Eric Kealley	882	25.3	+0.8
Country	Archibald Irving	851	24.4	+24.4
Country	Gerald Piesse	830	23.8	+1.5
Total formal votes		3,491	97.3	−0.7
Informal votes		96	2.7	+0.7
Turnout		3,587	86.0	−0.9
Two-candidate-preferred result
Country	Crawford Nalder	1,953	55.9	+55.9
Country	Archibald Irving	1,538	44.1	+44.1
Country hold		Swing	N/A	

=== West Perth ===
1947 Western Australian state election: West Perth
Party	Candidate	Votes	%	±%
Liberal	Robert McDonald	unopposed		
Liberal hold		Swing		

=== Williams-Narrogin ===
1947 Western Australian state election: Williams-Narrogin
Party	Candidate	Votes	%	±%
Country	Victor Doney	1,939	70.5	+3.9
Labor	Moses Mowday	813	29.5	−3.9
Total formal votes		2,752	99.2	+0.6
Informal votes		21	0.8	−0.6
Turnout		2,773	84.5	−0.3
Country hold		Swing	+3.9	

=== Yilgarn-Coolgardie ===
1947 Western Australian state election: Yilgarn-Coolgardie
Party	Candidate	Votes	%	±%
Labor	Lionel Kelly	unopposed		
Labor hold		Swing		

=== York ===
1947 Western Australian state election: York
Party	Candidate	Votes	%	±%
Country	Charles Perkins	1,621	67.1	+32.5
Labor	Colin Thorn	794	32.9	+5.5
Total formal votes		2,415	99.0	+0.2
Informal votes		25	1.0	−0.2
Turnout		2,440	85.0	−6.2
Country hold		Swing	+8.9	

== See also ==
- Candidates of the 1947 Western Australian state election
- 1947 Western Australian state election
- Members of the Western Australian Legislative Assembly, 1947–1950
