= Candidates of the 1950 Western Australian state election =

The 1950 Western Australian state election was held on 25 March 1950.

== Retiring Members ==
=== Labor ===
- Frederick Smith (MLA) (Brown Hill-Ivanhoe)

=== LCL ===
- Ross McDonald (MLA) (West Perth)

== Legislative Assembly ==
Sitting members are shown in bold text. Successful candidates are highlighted in the relevant colour. Where there is possible confusion, an asterisk (*) is also used.

Electorate	Held by	Labor candidate	LCL candidate	Country candidate	Other candidates
Albany	Country	William Martin	Alistair MacDonald	**Leonard Hill**	James Bolitho (Ind.)
Avon Valley	LCL		**James Mann**	Keith Halbert; Milford Smith	
Blackwood	LCL	William Eastcott	John Hearman	Alwyn Wagner	John Smith (Ind.)
Boulder	Labor	**Charlie Oliver**			
Bunbury	LCL	Frank Guthrie	**James Murray**	Percy Payne	
Canning	LCL	**Alfred Reynolds**	Arthur Griffith		Carlyle Ferguson (Ind. Country)
Claremont	LCL		**Charles North**		
Collie	Labor	**Harry May**			
Cottesloe	LCL	John Vivian	Ross Hutchinson		
Dale	LCL	Ronald Knowler	**Gerald Wild**	John Ellis	
Darling Range	Country	John Rolinson	Colin Cameron	Ray Owen*; Frederick Schoch	
East Perth	Labor	**Herb Graham**	Fred Book		
Eyre	Labor	**Emil Nulsen**	Roy Cunningham		
Fremantle	Labor	**Joseph Sleeman**	Lennox Dickson		Kathleen Duff (Ind. Labor); Kevin Healy (Comm.)
Gascoyne	Labor	**Frank Wise**	Noel Butcher		
Geraldton	Country	Bill Sewell		**Edmund Hall**	
Greenough	LCL		**David Brand**		
Guildford-Midland	Labor	**John Brady**	Irene Seaton		Alexander Jolly (Comm.)
Hannans	Labor	**Herbert McCulloch**	Roy Cunningham		
Harvey	LCL	Robert McCallum	Iven Manning	Walter Eckersley	
Kalgoorlie	Labor	**Herbert Styants**	Albert Rogers		
Katanning	Country			Crawford Nalder*; Wilhelm Beeck	
Kimberley	Labor	**Aubrey Coverley**			
Leederville	Labor	**Alexander Panton**	George Melville		
Maylands	Independent	John Gaffney			**Harry Shearn** (Ind.)
Melville	Labor	**John Tonkin**	Helen Brinkley		
Merredin-Yilgarn	Labor	**Lionel Kelly**	Charles Davies		
Middle Swan	LCL	James Hegney	Henry Hawkins		
Moore	Country			**John Ackland**	
Mount Hawthorn	Labor	**Bill Hegney**	John Mann		John Plummer-Leitch (Ind. Labor)
Mount Lawley	LCL		**Arthur Abbott**		James Collins (Ind.)
Mount Marshall	Country			**George Cornell**	
Murchison	Labor	**William Marshall**			
Murray	LCL	Charles Cross	**Ross McLarty**		
Narrogin	Country			**Victor Doney**	
Nedlands	LCL		**Norbert Keenan**; Cyril Bird		David Grayden* (Ind. Liberal); John Symonds (Ind. Liberal)
North Perth	LCL	Ted Needham	Alfred Spencer		
Northam	Labor	**Albert Hawke**		Thomas Letch	
Pilbara	Labor	**Alec Rodoreda**	Leonard Taplin		
Roe	Country	Percy Munday		**Charles Perkins***; **Harrie Seward**	
South Fremantle	Labor	**Thomas Fox**			
South Perth	LCL	Samuel Lynn	**George Yates**		
Stirling	Country			**Arthur Watts**	
Subiaco	LCL	Thomas Henley	**Florence Cardell-Oliver**		
Toodyay	Country	Archibald McNess		**Lindsay Thorn**	
Vasse	LCL		**William Bovell**	Robert Leiper	
Victoria Park	Independent	Hugh Andrew			**William Read** (Ind.)
Warren	Labor	**Ernest Hoar**			
Wembley Beaches	LCL	Richard Knox	**Les Nimmo**		
West Perth	LCL	**Lucien Triat**	Joseph Totterdell		

== See also ==
- Members of the Western Australian Legislative Assembly, 1947–1950
- Members of the Western Australian Legislative Assembly, 1950–1953
- 1950 Western Australian state election
