= Candidates of the 1947 Western Australian state election =

The 1947 Western Australian state election was held on 15 March 1947.

== Retiring Members ==
=== Labor ===
- Arthur Wilson (MLA) (Collie)
- John Willcock (MLA) (Geraldton)
- Harry Millington (MLA) (Mount Hawthorn)
- Frederick Withers (MLA) (Bunbury)
- Edward Holman (MLA) (Forrest)

=== Country ===
- Sydney Stubbs (MLA) (Wagin)

== Legislative Assembly ==
Sitting members are shown in bold text. Successful candidates are highlighted in the relevant colour. Where there is possible confusion, an asterisk (*) is also used.

Electorate	Held by	Labor candidate	Liberal candidate	Country candidate	Other candidates
Albany	Country	William Martin		**Leonard Hill**	Egbert Shenton (Progressive)
Avon	Labor	**William Telfer**		George Cornell	
Beverley	Country			**James Mann**	John Wilkinson (Ind.)
Boulder	Labor	**Philip Collier**			
Brown Hill-Ivanhoe	Labor	**Frederick Smith**			
Bunbury	Labor	John Kirke	James Murray	Albert Scott	
Canning	Labor	**Charles Cross**	George Yates		
Claremont	Liberal	William Carmody	**Charles North**		
Collie	Labor	Harry May			
East Perth	Labor	**Herb Graham**			James Collins (Ind. Liberal); Henry Mountjoy (Communist)
Forrest	Labor	Alfred Reynolds	David Johnstone	Keith Porteous	
Fremantle	Labor	**Joseph Sleeman**			
Gascoyne	Labor	**Frank Wise**			
Geraldton	Labor	Bill Sewell	Harold Daffen	Edmund Hall	
Greenough	Liberal	Thomas Shanahan	**David Brand**		
Guildford-Midland	Labor	**William Johnson**	Arthur Thompson		Alexander Jolly (Communist)
Hannans	Labor	**David Leahy**			
Irwin-Moore	Independent	Luke Travers		John Ackland	**Horace Berry** (Ind.)
Kalgoorlie	Labor	**Herbert Styants**			
Kanowna	Labor	**Emil Nulsen**			
Katanning	Country	John Powell		**Arthur Watts**	
Kimberley	Labor	**Aubrey Coverley**			Kimberley Durack (Ind.)
Leederville	Labor	**Alexander Panton**			
Maylands	Liberal		**Harry Shearn**		
Middle Swan	Labor	**James Hegney**	Bill Grayden	Mary Hamersley	
Mount Hawthorn	Labor	William Beadle	Les Nimmo	Norman Hard	Archibald Cruikshank (Ind.); Arthur West
Mount Magnet	Labor	**Lucien Triat**			
Mount Marshall	Country			**Hugh Leslie**	
Murchison	Labor	**William Marshall**			
Murray-Wellington	Liberal		**Ross McLarty**		
Nedlands	Liberal	William Williams	**Norbert Keenan**		
Nelson	Labor	**Ernest Hoar**	Edward Cummins		
Northam	Labor	**Albert Hawke**		Norm Baxter	
North Perth	Liberal	William Deal	**Arthur Abbott**		
North-East Fremantle	Labor	**John Tonkin**			
Perth	Labor	**Ted Needham**	Stanley Perry		Carlyle Ferguson (Ind.)
Pilbara	Labor	**Bill Hegney**			Leonard Taplin (Ind.)
Pingelly	Country			**Harrie Seward**	Percy Munday (Ind.)
Roebourne	Labor	**Alec Rodoreda**			
South Fremantle	Labor	**Thomas Fox**			
Subiaco	Liberal	Percival Potter	**Florence Cardell-Oliver**		
Sussex	Liberal	Robert Hearne	**William Willmott**		
Swan	Independent		Gerald Wild	Edward Parker	**Ray Owen** (Ind.)
Toodyay	Country			**Lindsay Thorn**	
Victoria Park	Independent	Charles Johnson			**William Read** (Ind.)
Wagin	Country	Eric Kealley		Crawford Nalder*; Archibald Irving; Gerald Piesse	
West Perth	Liberal		**Robert McDonald**		
Williams-Narrogin	Country	Moses Mowday		**Victor Doney**	
Yilgarn-Coolgardie	Labor	**Lionel Kelly**			
York	Country	Colin Thorn		**Charles Perkins**	

== See also ==
- Members of the Western Australian Legislative Assembly, 1943–1947
- Members of the Western Australian Legislative Assembly, 1947–1950
- 1947 Western Australian state election
