= Electoral results for the district of Boulder =

Western Australian district election results

This is a list of electoral results for the Electoral district of Boulder in Western Australian state elections.

== Members for Boulder ==
Boulder (1901–1962)
Member	Party	Term
John Hopkins	Ministerial	1901–1905
Philip Collier	Labor	1905–1948
Charlie Oliver	Labor	1948–1951
Arthur Moir	Labor	1951–1962
Boulder-Eyre (1962–1968)
Arthur Moir	Labor	1962–1968
Boulder-Dundas (1968–1977)
Arthur Moir	Labor	1968–1971
Tom Hartrey	Labor	1971–1977

== Election results ==
=== Elections in the 1970s ===
1974 Western Australian state election: Boulder-Dundas
Party	Candidate	Votes	%	±%
Labor	Tom Hartrey	3,770	61.8	
Liberal	Eric Bingley	1,751	28.7	
National Alliance	John Madden	584	9.6	
Total formal votes		6,105	92.2	
Informal votes		519	7.8	
Turnout		6,624	86.4	
Two-party-preferred result
Labor	Tom Hartrey	3,858	63.2	
Liberal	Eric Bingley	2,247	36.8	
Labor hold		Swing		

1971 Western Australian state election: Boulder-Dundas
Party	Candidate	Votes	%	±%
Labor	Tom Hartrey	4,202	75.8	−24.2
Independent	Kevin Merriman	749	13.5	+13.5
Democratic Labor	John Madden	595	10.7	+10.7
Total formal votes		5,546	96.3	
Informal votes		214	3.7	
Turnout		5,760	87.7	
Two-candidate-preferred result
Labor	Tom Hartrey	4,351	78.5	−21.5
Independent	Kevin Merriman	1,195	21.5	+21.5
Labor hold		Swing	N/A	

=== Elections in the 1960s ===
1968 Western Australian state election: Boulder-Dundas
Party	Candidate	Votes	%	±%
Labor	Arthur Moir	unopposed		
Labor hold		Swing		

1965 Western Australian state election: Boulder-Eyre
Party	Candidate	Votes	%	±%
Labor	Arthur Moir	unopposed		
Labor hold		Swing		

1962 Western Australian state election: Boulder-Eyre
Party	Candidate	Votes	%	±%
Labor	Arthur Moir	3,170	62.1	
Liberal and Country	Philip Charsley	1,161	22.7	
Independent	Orlando Stuart	389	7.6	
Country	William Kirwan	385	7.5	
Total formal votes		5,105	98.4	
Informal votes		81	1.6	
Turnout		5,186	92.0	
Two-party-preferred result
Labor	Arthur Moir		66.7	
Liberal and Country	Philip Charsley		33.3	
Labor hold		Swing		

- Two party preferred vote is estimated.

=== Elections in the 1950s ===
1959 Western Australian state election: Boulder
Party	Candidate	Votes	%	±%
Labor	Arthur Moir	unopposed		
Labor hold		Swing		

1956 Western Australian state election: Boulder
Party	Candidate	Votes	%	±%
Labor	Arthur Moir	unopposed		
Labor hold		Swing		

1953 Western Australian state election: Boulder
Party	Candidate	Votes	%	±%
Labor	Arthur Moir	unopposed		
Labor hold		Swing		

1951 Boulder state by-election
Party	Candidate	Votes	%	±%
Labor	Arthur Moir	unopposed		
Labor hold		Swing		

1950 Western Australian state election: Boulder
Party	Candidate	Votes	%	±%
Labor	Charlie Oliver	unopposed		
Labor hold		Swing		

=== Elections in the 1940s ===
1948 Boulder state by-election
Party	Candidate	Votes	%	±%
Labor	Charlie Oliver	2,399	78.9	–21.1
Liberal	Billy Snedden	553	18.2	+18.2
Justice and Liberty Liberal	James Collins	87	2.9	+2.9
Total formal votes		3,039	98.3	n/a
Informal votes		53	1.7	n/a
Turnout		3,092	87.4	n/a
Labor hold		Swing	n/a	

- A two-party-preferred calculation was not made.

1947 Western Australian state election: Boulder
Party	Candidate	Votes	%	±%
Labor	Philip Collier	unopposed		
Labor hold		Swing		

1943 Western Australian state election: Boulder
Party	Candidate	Votes	%	±%
Labor	Philip Collier	unopposed		
Labor hold		Swing		

=== Elections in the 1930s ===
1939 Western Australian state election: Boulder
Party	Candidate	Votes	%	±%
Labor	Philip Collier	2,039	61.6	−38.4
Independent	Walter Coath	961	29.1	+29.1
Communist	Wilfred Mountjoy	308	9.3	+9.3
Total formal votes		3,308	98.2	
Informal votes		62	1.8	
Turnout		3,370	95.1	
Labor hold		Swing	N/A	

- Preferences were not distributed.

1936 Western Australian state election: Boulder
Party	Candidate	Votes	%	±%
Labor	Philip Collier	unopposed		
Labor hold		Swing		

1933 Western Australian state election: Boulder
Party	Candidate	Votes	%	±%
Labor	Philip Collier	2,337	89.5	−10.5
Communist	Wilfred Mountjoy	274	10.5	+10.5
Total formal votes		2,611	96.7	
Informal votes		89	3.3	
Turnout		2,700	92.1	
Labor hold		Swing	N/A	

1930 Western Australian state election: Boulder
Party	Candidate	Votes	%	±%
Labor	Philip Collier	unopposed		
Labor hold		Swing		

=== Elections in the 1920s ===
1927 Western Australian state election: Boulder
Party	Candidate	Votes	%	±%
Labor	Philip Collier	unopposed		
Labor hold		Swing		

1924 Western Australian state election: Boulder
Party	Candidate	Votes	%	±%
Labor	Philip Collier	unopposed		
Labor hold		Swing		

1921 Western Australian state election: Boulder
Party	Candidate	Votes	%	±%
Labor	Philip Collier	1,833	54.5	−3.9
National Labor	James Rogers	1,533	45.5	+3.9
Total formal votes		3,366	99.5	−0.1
Informal votes		16	0.5	+0.1
Turnout		3,382	84.4	+12.4
Labor hold		Swing	−3.9	

=== Elections in the 1910s ===
1917 Western Australian state election: Boulder
Party	Candidate	Votes	%	±%
Labor	Philip Collier	2,013	58.4	–41.6
National Labor	James Reed	1,435	41.6	+41.6
Total formal votes		3,448	99.7	n/a
Informal votes		12	0.3	n/a
Turnout		3,460	72.0	n/a
Labor hold		Swing	–41.6	

- Collier won Boulder unopposed at the 1914 election.

1914 Western Australian state election: Boulder
Party	Candidate	Votes	%	±%
Labor	Philip Collier	unopposed		
Labor hold		Swing		

1911 Western Australian state election: Boulder
Party	Candidate	Votes	%	±%
Labor	Philip Collier	unopposed		
Labor hold		Swing		

=== Elections in the 1900s ===
1908 Western Australian state election: Boulder
Party	Candidate	Votes	%	±%
Labour	Philip Collier	1,798	73.1	+26.3
Ministerialist	James Johnston	661	26.9	−18.8
Total formal votes		2,459	97.2	−2.4
Informal votes		71	2.8	+2.4
Turnout		2,530	75.8	+6.7
Labour hold		Swing	N/A	

1905 Western Australian state election: Boulder
Party	Candidate	Votes	%	±%
Labour	Philip Collier	872	46.8	+8.3
Ministerialist	John Hopkins	853	45.7	–15.8
Independent	William Rabbish	140	7.5	+7.5
Total formal votes		1,865	99.6	–0.1
Informal votes		8	0.4	+0.1
Turnout		1,880	69.1	+9.0
Labour gain from Ministerialist		Swing	+8.3	

1904 Western Australian state election: Boulder
Party	Candidate	Votes	%	±%
Ministerialist	John Hopkins	1,327	61.5	+5.3
Labour	Michael McCarthy	830	38.5	+1.5
Total formal votes		2,157	99.7	+0.7
Informal votes		6	0.3	–0.7
Turnout		2,157	60.1	+4.2
Ministerialist hold		Swing	+5.3	

1901 Western Australian state election: Boulder
Party	Candidate	Votes	%	±%
Opposition	John Hopkins	628	56.2	+56.2
Labour	George Wiles	414	37.0	+37.0
Opposition	John Keegan	76	6.8	+6.8
Total formal votes		1,118	99.0	n/a
Informal votes		11	1.0	n/a
Turnout		1,129	55.9	n/a
Opposition win		(new seat)		
