= Members of the Western Australian Legislative Assembly, 1950–1953 =

This is a list of members of the Western Australian Legislative Assembly between the 1950 election and the 1953 election, together known as the 20th Parliament.

Name	Party	District	Years in office
Arthur Abbott	Liberal	Mount Lawley	1939–1956
John Ackland	Country	Moore	1947–1958
Stewart Bovell	Liberal	Vasse	1947–1971
John Brady	Labor	Guildford-Midland	1948–1974
David Brand	Liberal	Greenough	1945–1975
Noel Butcher^{[3]}	Ind. Lib.	Gascoyne	1951–1953
(Dame) Florence Cardell-Oliver	Liberal	Subiaco	1936–1956
George Cornell	Country	Mount Marshall	1947–1967
Aubrey Coverley	Labor	Kimberley	1924–1953
Victor Doney	Country	Narrogin	1928–1956
Thomas Fox^{[2]}	Labor	South Fremantle	1935–1951
Herb Graham	Labor	East Perth	1943–1973
David Grayden	Ind. Lib.	Nedlands	1950–1953
Arthur Griffith	Liberal	Canning	1950–1953
Frank Guthrie	Labor	Bunbury	1950–1955
Albert Hawke	Labor	Northam	1933–1968
John Hearman	Liberal	Blackwood	1950–1968
Bill Hegney	Labor	Mount Hawthorn	1939–1968
James Hegney	Labor	Middle Swan	1930–1947; 1950–1968
Leonard Hill	Country	Albany	1936–1956
Ernest Hoar	Labor	Warren	1943–1957
Ross Hutchinson	Liberal	Cottesloe	1950–1977
Ted Johnson^{[5]}	Labor	Leederville	1952–1959
Lionel Kelly	Labor	Merredin-Yilgarn	1941–1968
Dick Lawrence^{[2]}	Labor	South Fremantle	1951–1960
James Mann	Liberal	Avon Valley	1930–1962
Iven Manning	Liberal	Harvey	1950–1974
William Marshall^{[6]}	Labor	Murchison	1921–1952
Harry May	Labor	Collie	1947–1968
Herbert McCulloch	Labor	Hannans	1949–1956
Sir Ross McLarty	Liberal	Murray	1930–1962
Arthur Moir^{[4]}	Labor	Boulder	1951–1971
Crawford Nalder	Country	Katanning	1947–1974
Ted Needham	Labor	North Perth	1904–1905; 1933–1953
Les Nimmo	Liberal	Wembley Beaches	1947–1956; 1959–1968
Charles North	Liberal	Claremont	1924–1956
Emil Nulsen	Labor	Eyre	1932–1962
Everard O'Brien^{[6]}	Labor	Murchison	1952–1959
Edward Oldfield^{[1]}	Liberal	Maylands	1951–1965
Charlie Oliver ^{[4]}	Labor	Boulder	1948–1951
Ray Owen	Country	Darling Range	1944–1947; 1950–1962
Alexander Panton^{[5]}	Labor	Leederville	1924–1951
Charles Perkins	Country	Roe	1942–1962
William Read	Independent	Victoria Park	1945–1953
Alec Rodoreda	Labor	Pilbara	1933–1958
Bill Sewell	Labor	Geraldton	1950–1974
Harry Shearn^{[1]}	Independent	Maylands	1936–1951
Joseph Sleeman	Labor	Fremantle	1924–1959
Herbert Styants	Labor	Kalgoorlie	1936–1956
Lindsay Thorn	Country	Toodyay	1930–1959
John Tonkin	Labor	Melville	1933–1977
Joseph Totterdell	Liberal	West Perth	1950–1953
Arthur Watts	Country	Stirling	1935–1962
Gerald Wild	Liberal	Dale	1947–1965
Frank Wise^{[3]}	Labor	Gascoyne	1933–1951
George Yates	Liberal	South Perth	1947–1956

== Notes ==
^{1} On 25 January 1951, the Independent member for Maylands, Harry Shearn, died. Liberal candidate Edward Oldfield won the resulting by-election on 17 February 1951.
^{2} On 20 April 1951, the Labor member for South Fremantle, Thomas Fox, died. Labor candidate Dick Lawrence won the resulting by-election on 14 July 1951.
^{3} On 9 July 1951, the Labor member for Gascoyne and former premier Frank Wise resigned to take up an appointment as Administrator of the Northern Territory. Independent Liberal candidate Noel Butcher won the resulting by-election on 13 October 1951.
^{4} On 16 August 1951, the Labor member for Boulder, Charlie Oliver, resigned. Labor candidate Arthur Moir was elected unopposed on 14 September 1951.
^{5} On 25 December 1951, the Labor member for Leederville, Alexander Panton, died. Labor candidate Stephen Johnson won the resulting by-election on 9 February 1952.
^{6} On 19 August 1952, the Labor member for Murchison, William Marshall, died. Labor candidate Everard O'Brien won the resulting by-election on 8 November 1952.

== Sources ==
- "Former Members" (PDF). Parliament of Western Australia. 2011. Archived from the original (PDF) on 7 August 2011.
