= Members of the Western Australian Legislative Assembly, 1943–1947 =

Australian Legislative Assembly

This is a list of members of the Western Australian Legislative Assembly between the 1943 election and the 1947 election, together known as the 18th Parliament. In January 1945, the Nationalists, officially known as the National Party of Western Australia, reformed as the Liberal Party (Western Australian Division) under the leadership of Robert McDonald, and all Nationalist MLAs' allegiances changed accordingly.

Name	Party	District	Years in office
Arthur Abbott	Nat. / Lib.	North Perth	1939–1956
Horace Berry	Independent	Irwin-Moore	1939–1947
David Brand^{[5]}	Liberal	Greenough	1945–1975
Florence Cardell-Oliver	Nat. / Lib.	Subiaco	1936–1956
Philip Collier	Labor	Boulder	1905–1948
Aubrey Coverley	Labor	Kimberley	1924–1953
Charles Cross	Labor	Canning	1933–1947
Victor Doney	Country	Williams-Narrogin	1928–1956
Thomas Fox	Labor	South Fremantle	1935–1951
Herb Graham	Labor	East Perth	1943–1973
Albert Hawke	Labor	Northam	1933–1968
Bill Hegney	Labor	Pilbara	1939–1968
James Hegney	Labor	Middle Swan	1930–1947; 1950–1968
Leonard Hill	Country	Albany	1936–1956
Ernest Hoar	Labor	Nelson	1943–1957
Edward Holman	Labor	Forrest	1939–1947
William Johnson	Labor	Guildford-Midland	1901–1905; 1906–1917; 1924–1948
Norbert Keenan	Nat. / Lib.	Nedlands	1904–1911; 1930–1950
Lionel Kelly	Ind. / Labor	Yilgarn-Coolgardie	1941–1968
David Leahy	Labor	Hannans	1938–1948
Hugh Leslie	Country	Mount Marshall	1943–1949
James Mann	Country	Beverley	1930–1962
William Marshall^{[6]}	Labor	Murchison	1921–1952
Robert McDonald	Nat. / Lib.	West Perth	1933–1950
Ross McLarty	Nat. / Lib.	Murray-Wellington	1930–1962
Harry Millington	Labor	Mount Hawthorn	1924–1947
Ted Needham	Labor	Perth	1904–1905; 1933–1953
John Newton^{[5]}	Labor	Greenough	1943–1945
Charles North	Nat. / Lib.	Claremont	1924–1956
Emil Nulsen	Labor	Kanowna	1932–1962
Ray Owen^{[2]}	Ind. Country	Swan	1944–1947; 1950–1962
Alexander Panton	Labor	Leederville	1924–1951
Charles Perkins	Country	York	1942–1962
Howard Raphael^{[4]}	Labor	Victoria Park	1930–1944
William Read^{[4]}	Independent	Victoria Park	1945–1953
Alec Rodoreda	Labor	Roebourne	1933–1958
Richard Sampson^{[2]}	Country	Swan	1921–1944
Harrie Seward	Country	Pingelly	1933–1950
Harry Shearn	Ind. Nat.	Maylands	1936–1951
Joseph Sleeman	Labor	Fremantle	1924–1959
Frederick Smith	Labor	Brown Hill-Ivanhoe	1932–1950
Sydney Stubbs	Country	Wagin	1911–1947
Herbert Styants	Labor	Kalgoorlie	1936–1956
William Telfer^{[3]}	Labor	Avon	1943–1947
Lindsay Thorn	Country	Toodyay	1930–1959
John Tonkin^{[1]}	Labor	North-East Fremantle	1933–1977
Lucien Triat	Labor	Mount Magnet	1939–1950
Arthur Watts	Country	Katanning	1935–1962
Arthur Wilson	Labor	Collie	1908–1947
John Willcock	Labor	Geraldton	1917–1947
William Willmott	Nat. / Lib.	Sussex	1938–1947
Frank Wise	Labor	Gascoyne	1933–1951
Frederick Withers	Labor	Bunbury	1924–1947

== Notes ==
^{1} On 9 December 1943, John Tonkin, the member for North-East Fremantle, was appointed as Minister for Education and Social Services in the Willcock Ministry. He was therefore required to resign and contest a ministerial by-election on 17 December 1943, in which he was returned unopposed.
^{2} On 16 February 1944, the Country member for Swan, Richard Sampson, died. Independent Country candidate Ray Owen won the resulting by-election on 29 April 1944.
^{3} At the 1943 state election, Labor candidate William Telfer defeated the sitting Country member Ignatius Boyle by 15 votes. The Court of Disputed Returns ordered a fresh election for 1 July 1944, at which Telfer won a 298-vote majority against Boyle.
^{4} On 9 December 1944, the Labor member for Victoria Park, Howard Raphael, died. Independent candidate William Read won the resulting by-election on 10 February 1945.
^{5} At the 1943 election, the Labor candidate for Greenough, John Newton, a farmer from Mingenew who had enlisted in the RAAF as a Flight Lieutenant in 1941 and left for the United Kingdom in 1942, unexpectedly defeated the sitting Country member, William Patrick. On 14 January 1944, he was reported missing after a raid on Germany. On 31 July 1945, a panel of members was appointed to enquire whether a vacancy existed, and on 27 September 1945, the seat was declared vacant. Liberal candidate David Brand won the resulting by-election on 27 October 1945, becoming the first person to win an Australian election under the new Liberal banner.
^{6} On 3 August 1945, William Marshall, the member for Murchison, was appointed as a Minister in the Wise Ministry. He was therefore required to resign and contest a ministerial by-election on 17 August 1945, in which he was returned unopposed.

== Sources ==
- "Former Members" (PDF). Parliament of Western Australia. 2011. Archived from the original (PDF) on 7 August 2011.
