= Members of the Western Australian Legislative Assembly, 1947–1950 =

This is a list of members of the Western Australian Legislative Assembly between the 1947 election and the 1950 election, together known as the 19th Parliament.

| Name | Party | District | Years in office |
|---|---|---|---|
| Arthur Abbott^{[1]} | Liberal | North Perth | 1939–1956 |
| John Ackland | Country | Irwin-Moore | 1947–1958 |
| Stewart Bovell^{[3]} | Liberal | Sussex | 1947–1971 |
| John Brady^{[4]} | Labor | Guildford-Midland | 1948–1974 |
| David Brand | Liberal | Greenough | 1945–1975 |
| Florence Cardell-Oliver | Liberal | Subiaco | 1936–1956 |
| Philip Collier^{[5]} | Labor | Boulder | 1905–1948 |
| George Cornell | Country | Avon | 1947–1967 |
| Aubrey Coverley | Labor | Kimberley | 1924–1953 |
| Victor Doney^{[1]} | Country | Williams-Narrogin | 1928–1956 |
| Thomas Fox | Labor | South Fremantle | 1935–1951 |
| Herb Graham | Labor | East Perth | 1943–1973 |
| Bill Grayden^{[8]} | Liberal | Middle Swan | 1947–1949; 1956–1993 |
| Edmund Hall | Country | Geraldton | 1947–1950 |
| Albert Hawke | Labor | Northam | 1933–1968 |
| Bill Hegney^{[2]} | Labor | Pilbara | 1939–1968 |
| Leonard Hill | Country | Albany | 1936–1956 |
| Ernest Hoar | Labor | Nelson | 1943–1957 |
| William Johnson^{[4]} | Labor | Guildford-Midland | 1901–1905; 1906–1917; 1924–1948 |
| Sir Norbert Keenan | Liberal | Nedlands | 1904–1911; 1930–1950 |
| Lionel Kelly | Labor | Yilgarn-Coolgardie | 1941–1968 |
| David Leahy^{[6]} | Labor | Hannans | 1938–1948 |
| Hugh Leslie^{[9]} | Country | Mount Marshall | 1943–1949 |
| James Mann | Country/Ind./ Liberal^{[7]} | Beverley | 1930–1962 |
| William Marshall | Labor | Murchison | 1921–1952 |
| Harry May | Labor | Collie | 1947–1968 |
| Herbert McCulloch^{[6]} | Labor | Hannans | 1949–1956 |
| Sir Robert McDonald^{[1]} | Liberal | West Perth | 1933–1950 |
| Ross McLarty^{[1]} | Liberal | Murray-Wellington | 1930–1962 |
| James Murray | Liberal | Bunbury | 1947–1950 |
| Crawford Nalder | Country | Wagin | 1947–1974 |
| Ted Needham | Labor | Perth | 1904–1905; 1933–1953 |
| Les Nimmo | Liberal | Mount Hawthorn | 1947–1956; 1959–1968 |
| Charles North | Liberal | Claremont | 1924–1956 |
| Emil Nulsen | Labor | Kanowna | 1932–1962 |
| Charlie Oliver ^{[5]} | Labor | Boulder | 1948–1951 |
| Alexander Panton | Labor | Leederville | 1924–1951 |
| Charles Perkins | Country | York | 1942–1962 |
| William Read | Independent | Victoria Park | 1945–1953 |
| Alfred Reynolds | Labor | Forrest | 1947–1950 |
| Alec Rodoreda | Labor | Roebourne | 1933–1958 |
| Harrie Seward^{[1]} | Country | Pingelly | 1933–1950 |
| Harry Shearn | Independent | Maylands | 1936–1951 |
| Joseph Sleeman | Labor | Fremantle | 1924–1959 |
| Frederick Smith | Labor | Brown Hill-Ivanhoe | 1932–1950 |
| Herbert Styants | Labor | Kalgoorlie | 1936–1956 |
| Lindsay Thorn^{[1]} | Country | Toodyay | 1930–1959 |
| John Tonkin | Labor | North-East Fremantle | 1933–1977 |
| Lucien Triat | Labor | Mount Magnet | 1939–1950 |
| Arthur Watts^{[1]} | Country | Katanning | 1935–1962 |
| Gerald Wild | Liberal | Swan | 1947–1965 |
| William Willmott^{[3]} | Liberal | Sussex | 1938–1947 |
| Frank Wise | Labor | Gascoyne | 1933–1951 |
| George Yates | Liberal | Canning | 1947–1956 |

== Notes ==
^{1} Following the 1947 state election a new Cabinet consisting of eight members, including one Member of the Legislative Council, was appointed to the McLarty Ministry. These members were therefore required to resign and contest ministerial by-elections on 17 April 1947, at which all were returned unopposed. Due to changes in the law during the term of Parliament, these were the last ministerial by-elections to be held in Western Australia.
^{2} At the 1947 election, the Labor member for Electoral district of Pilbara, Bill Hegney, and his Independent rival, Leonard Taplin, each secured 234 votes, and Hegney was pronounced the winner on the casting vote of the returning officer. A petition was lodged against Hegney's return, and a fresh election was called for 2 August 1947, which Hegney won against the same opponent with a 31-vote majority.
^{3} On 2 May 1947, the Liberal member for Sussex, William Willmott, died. Liberal candidate Stewart Bovell won the resulting by-election on 7 June 1947.
^{4} On 26 January 1948, the Labor member for Guildford-Midland, William Johnson, died. Labor candidate John Brady won the resulting by-election on 13 March 1948.
^{5} On 18 October 1948, the Labor member for Boulder, former Premier (1924–1930; 1933–1936) Philip Collier, died. Labor candidate Charlie Oliver won the resulting by-election on 4 December 1948.
^{6} On 19 December 1948, the Labor member for Hannans, David Leahy, died. Labor candidate Herbert McCulloch won the resulting by-election on 26 February 1949.
^{7} In March 1949, James Mann, the member for Beverley, led a breakaway faction out of the Country Party, and initially sat as an Independent. His faction merged with the Liberal Party in May 1949, and the party became known as the Liberal and Country League.
^{8} On 27 October 1949, Bill Grayden, the Liberal member for Middle Swan, resigned in order to stand for the Division of Swan at the 1949 federal election. A by-election was not called due to the proximity of the 1950 state election.
^{9} On 30 October 1949, Hugh Leslie, the Country member for Mount Marshall, resigned in order to stand for the Division of Moore at the 1949 federal election. A by-election was not called due to the proximity of the 1950 state election.

== Sources ==
- "Former Members" (PDF). Parliament of Western Australia. 2011. Archived from the original (PDF) on 7 August 2011.
