= Cecil Quinlan =

Australian rules footballer

Personal information
- Full name: Cecil Joseph Quinlan
- Born: 4 May 1893; Perth, Western Australia
- Died: 23 December 1926 (aged 33); Perth, Western Australia
- Original team: Xavier College

Playing career^{1}
Years	Club	Games (Goals)
1910	Melbourne	2 (1)
- ^{1} Playing statistics correct to the end of 1910.

Cecil Joseph Quinlan (4 May 1893 – 23 December 1926) was an Australian rules footballer who played with Melbourne in the Victorian Football League (VFL).

A medical doctor, he died suddenly at age 33 in 1926 in Perth, Western Australia. His funeral was attended by over 300 people, including the Premier of Western Australia, Philip Collier.
