= 1948 Boulder state by-election =

A by-election for the seat of Boulder in the Legislative Assembly of Western Australia was held on 4 December 1948. It was triggered by the death of Philip Collier, a former premier, on 18 October 1948. The Labor Party retained the seat at the election, with Charlie Oliver winning 78.9 percent of the first-preference vote.

== Background ==
Philip Collier had held Boulder for the Labor Party since the 1905 state election, winning re-election at thirteen further elections (and being returned unopposed five times). He was leader of the Labor Party from 1917 to 1936, and premier on two occasions, from 1924 to 1930 and from 1933 to 1936. Collier died at his home in Mount Lawley on 18 October 1948. After his death, the writ for the by-election was issued on 27 October, with the close of nominations on 19 November. Polling day was on 4 December, with the writ returned on 14 December.

== Results ==
Boulder state by-election, 1948
Party	Candidate	Votes	%	±%
Labor	Charlie Oliver	2,399	78.9	–21.1
Liberal	Billy Snedden	553	18.2	+18.2
Justice and Liberty Liberal	James Collins	87	2.9	+2.9
Total formal votes		3,039	98.3	n/a
Informal votes		53	1.7	n/a
Turnout		3,092	87.4	n/a
Labor hold		Swing	n/a	

- A two-party-preferred calculation was not made.

== Aftermath ==
Oliver was re-elected unopposed at the 1950 state election, but resigned his seat the following year to take up a position in the New South Wales union movement. One of his opponents for Labor preselection was John Teahan, who later won election to the Legislative Council in 1954. Billy Snedden, the unsuccessful Liberal candidate, eventually moved to Victoria and was elected to the House of Representatives. He was the Liberal Party's federal leader (and leader of the opposition) from 1972 to 1975.

== See also ==
- List of Western Australian state by-elections
