= Peter Blaxell =

Australian justice

Peter Donald Blaxell is a retired justice of the Supreme Court of Western Australia. He was appointed to the Supreme Court bench on 2 February 2005 and retired on 25 February 2011. Before his appointment as a Supreme Court justice, Blaxell was a judge of the District Court of Western Australia for 14 years, having joined that court in February 1991. From December 2012 to January 2016, he was the chair of the Perth Theatre Trust. He is the brother of Tom Blaxell.

At the 1989 Western Australian state election, Blaxell was the Liberal Party's candidate for the electoral district of Maylands. He was also the Liberal Party's candidate for the 1988 Ascot state by-election.
