= John Harman (Australian politician) =

Australian politician (1932–1998)

The Honourable John Harman AM

23rd Speaker of the Legislative Assembly of Western Australia
- In office 22 March 1983 – 8 February 1986
- Preceded by: Ian Thompson
- Succeeded by: Mike Barnett

Member of the Legislative Assembly of Western Australia
- In office 23 March 1968 – 8 February 1986
- Preceded by: Bob Marshall
- Succeeded by: Peter Dowding
- Constituency: Maylands

Personal details
- Born: 22 March 1932 Bassendean, Western Australia, Australia
- Died: 27 February 1998 (aged 65) Sydney, New South Wales, Australia
- Party: Labor

John Joseph Harman AM (22 March 1932 – 27 February 1998) was an Australian politician who was a Labor Party member of the Legislative Assembly of Western Australia from 1968 to 1986, representing the seat of Maylands. He served as Speaker of the Legislative Assembly from 1983 to 1986.

Harman was born in Perth, and educated at various Catholic schools. After leaving school, he worked for a period as a clerk with the state government's Department of Lands Surveys, and then as a field officer with the Department of Native Welfare. A member of the Civil Service Association executive and a member of the Labor Party from 1960, Harman entered politics at the 1968 state election, defeating the sitting Liberal member Bob Marshall. After the 1971 election, which saw the election of a Labor government led by John Tonkin, he was appointed chief government whip. Following a cabinet reshuffle in May 1973, Harman was made Minister for Labour, Minister for Immigration, Minister for Price Control, and Minister for Consumer Protection, although he served only until Labor's defeat at the 1974 election. Harman remained a member of the Labor shadow ministry until 1981, serving under three leaders of the opposition (John Tonkin, Colin Jamieson, and Ron Davies). He was elected to the speakership after Labor's victory at the 1983 election, serving until his retirement from politics at the 1986 election. Harman subsequently served as state chairman of the Australian Bicentennial Authority, and in 1989 was made a Member of the Order of Australia (AM) for his work.

== See also ==
- Tonkin Ministry
- Tonkin Shadow Ministry

Parliament of Western Australia
Preceded by Bob Marshall	Member for Maylands; 1968–1986	Succeeded by Peter Dowding
Preceded by Ian Thompson	Speaker of the Legislative Assembly; 1983–1986	Succeeded by Mike Barnett
Political offices
Preceded by Don Taylor	Minister for Labour; 1973–1974	Succeeded by Bill Grayden
Preceded by Don Taylor	Minister for Immigration; 1973–1974	Succeeded by Bill Grayden
Preceded by Don Taylor	Minister for Price Control; 1973–1974	Abolished
Preceded by Don Taylor	Minister for Consumer Protection; 1973–1974	Succeeded by Bill Grayden
