= 1990 Maylands state by-election =

Western Australian by-election to fill a seat after the resignation of Peter Dowding

The 1990 Maylands state by-election was a by-election for the seat of Maylands in the Legislative Assembly of Western Australia held on 26 May 1990. It was triggered by the resignation of Peter Dowding (the sitting Labor member and former premier) on 26 April 1990. The Labor Party retained Maylands at the election, albeit with a reduced majority. Judy Edwards, a general practitioner based in Mount Lawley, secured 55.57 percent of the two-party-preferred vote. Edwards became only the second woman to win election to the Parliament of Western Australia at a by-election, after May Holman in 1925. The election occurred on the same day as the 1990 Fremantle state by-election.

== Background ==
Peter Dowding had held Maylands for the Labor Party since the 1986 state election, when he transferred from the Legislative Council to the Legislative Assembly. He replaced Brian Burke as leader of the Labor Party (and thus as premier) in February 1988, and led the party to victory at the 1989 election. However, Dowding was forced to resign as premier in February 1990 after losing the confidence of the Labor partyroom, having been caught up in the WA Inc. scandal. He quit parliament a few months later, on 26 April. The writ for the by-election was issued on the same day, with the close of nominations on 4 May. Polling day was on 26 May, with the writ returned on 6 June.

== Results ==
Maylands state by-election, 1990
Party	Candidate	Votes	%	±%
Labor	Judy Edwards	8,083	44.8	–11.8
Liberal	Deanne Koppman	6,586	36.5	+3.3
Greens	Bevan Carter	1,763	9.8	+9.8
Democrats	Robert Whitehead	584	3.2	+3.2
Grey Power	Josh Sacino	366	2.0	–2.4
Independent	Avon Lovell	292	1.6	+1.6
Independent	Roger Broinowski	109	0.6	+0.6
Independent	Barry Lloyd	87	0.5	+0.5
Independent	Jurgen Marter	61	0.3	+0.3
Independent	Paul Augustson	46	0.3	+0.3
Independent	Noel Sharp	36	0.2	+0.2
Independent	Arthur Galletly	12	0.1	+0.1
Total formal votes		18,025	96.0	+5.2
Informal votes		759	4.0	–5.2
Turnout		18,784	80.8	–9.8
Two-party-preferred result
Labor	Judy Edwards	10,017	55.6	–4.5
Liberal	Deanne Koppman	8,008	44.4	+4.5
Labor hold		Swing	–4.5	

== Aftermath ==
Edwards retained Maylands until her retirement at the 2008 state election, and served as a minister in the government of Geoff Gallop.

== See also ==
- List of Western Australian state by-elections
- Women in the Western Australian Legislative Assembly
