= Arthur Moir =

Australian politician

Member of the Legislative Assembly of Western Australia
- In office 14 September 1951 – 31 March 1962
- Preceded by: Charlie Oliver
- Succeeded by: None (abolished)
- Constituency: Boulder
- In office 31 March 1962 – 23 March 1968
- Preceded by: None (new seat)
- Succeeded by: None (abolished)
- Constituency: Boulder-Eyre
- In office 23 March 1968 – 20 February 1971
- Preceded by: None (new seat)
- Succeeded by: Tom Hartrey
- Constituency: Boulder-Dundas

Personal details
- Born: 24 December 1900 Perth, Western Australia, Australia
- Died: 27 April 1984 (aged 83) Black Rock, Victoria, Australia
- Party: Labor

Arthur McAlister Moir (24 December 1900 – 27 April 1984) was an Australian politician who was a Labor Party member of the Legislative Assembly of Western Australia from 1951 to 1971. He served as a minister in the government of Albert Hawke.

Moir was born in Perth to Elizabeth (née Mill) and Robert McAlister Moir. He went to school in the country (including at Yarloop and Welbungin), and subsequently worked for periods as a timber miller (at Wellington Mill), wheat farmer (at Bencubbin, and miner (at Kalgoorlie). From 1929 to 1936, Moir served on the Mount Marshall Road Board. He became a union organiser in 1948, working for the Kalgoorlie-Boulder division of the Australian Workers Union (AWU). Moir entered parliament at a 1951 by-election for the seat of Boulder, necessitated by the resignation of another former AWU organiser, Charlie Oliver. He won the by-election unopposed, and throughout his career was only opposed once, at the 1962 state election.

In the Hawke government, Moir was deputy chairman of committees from 1953 to 1956 and then chairman of committees from 1956 to 1957. He entered cabinet in December 1957, replacing Lionel Kelly as Minister for Mines in a reshuffle after the resignation of Ernest Hoar. In November 1958, following the death of Gilbert Fraser, Moir was also made Chief Secretary. He held both positions until the Labor government's defeat at the 1959 state election. Moir left parliament at the 1971 election, and died in Melbourne in April 1984, aged 83. He had married Olive Lockett in 1933, with whom he had two children.

Political offices
Preceded by Lionel Kelly	Minister for Mines; 1957–1959	Succeeded by Arthur Griffith
Preceded by Gilbert Fraser	Chief Secretary; 1958–1959	Succeeded by Ross Hutchinson
Parliament of Western Australia
Preceded by Charlie Oliver	Member for Boulder; 1951–1962	Abolished
New seat	Member for Boulder-Eyre; 1962–1968	Abolished
New seat	Member for Boulder-Dundas; 1968–1971	Succeeded by Tom Hartrey
