= Judy Edwards =

Australian politician (born 1955)

Judy Edwards AM

Member of the Western Australian Legislative Assembly
- In office 26 May 1990 – 6 September 2008
- Preceded by: Peter Dowding
- Succeeded by: Lisa Baker
- Constituency: Maylands

Personal details
- Born: 10 April 1955 (age 71) Beverley, Western Australia
- Party: Labor Party
- Education: MBBS
- Profession: Doctor

Judith Mary Edwards AM (born 10 April 1955) is an Australian politician. She was the Labor Party member of the Western Australian Legislative Assembly from May 1990 to September 2008, representing the electorate of Maylands.

Edwards was born in Beverley, Western Australia. She won preselection for the seat of Maylands following the resignation of Peter Dowding, and entered parliament at the 1990 Maylands by-election. She has subsequently been re-elected four more times in 1993, 1996, 2001 and 2005.

Prior to entering Parliament, Edwards was a general practitioner after completing her Bachelor of Medicine and Surgery from the University of Western Australia. Edward was appointed as minister of the environment and heritage from 2001 to 2003, and minister of environment from 2003 to 2006.

Edwards retired in 2008 and Lisa Baker won pre-selection for the seat, eventually winning the seat.

She was appointed a Member of the Order of Australia in the 2024 Australia Day Honours for her "significant service to the people and Parliament of Western Australia, and to the community".
