= Robert Clothier (politician) =

Australian politician

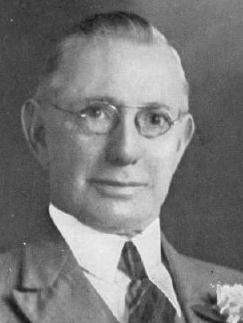

Senator for Western Australia
- In office 1 July 1938 – 30 June 1950

Member of the Western Australian Legislative Assembly
- In office 8 April 1933 – 15 February 1936
- Preceded by: John Scaddan
- Succeeded by: Harry Shearn

Personal details
- Born: 26 March 1877 Bulimba, Queensland, Australia
- Died: 31 May 1964 (aged 87) Perth, Western Australia, Australia
- Party: Labor
- Spouse: Ethel Gluyas (m. 1905; died 1961)
- Occupation: Bootmaker

Robert Ernest Clothier (26 March 1877 – 31 May 1964) was an Australian politician. Born in Queensland, he received a primary education before becoming a bookmaker. Moving to Perth, Western Australia, he became a foreman at a boot factory and secretary of the Bootmakers' Union. In 1933 he was elected to the Western Australian Legislative Assembly as the Labor member for Maylands, holding the seat until 1936. In 1937, he was elected to the Australian Senate as a Labor Senator for Western Australia. He was defeated in 1949 after he was demoted on the ticket to make way for union secretary Don Willesee. Clothier died in 1964.

== Early life ==
Clothier was born on 26 March 1877 in Bulimba, Queensland, the son of Clara (née Pashew) and Frederick Robert Clothier. His father, born in Glasgow, was a stonemason.

Clothier grew up in Brisbane, attending a state school in Coorparoo. He served an apprenticeship with a Danish bootmaker and later worked in Edward Thomas Neighbour's boot factory in Fortitude Valley, where his supervisor was his future Senate colleague Joe Collings. Clothier moved to Western Australia in 1904, attracted by better economic conditions. He took up a selection and farmed wheat for a period, but subsequently returned to Perth where he became the foreman of the Berryman & Co. boot factory and secretary of the Bootmakers' Union.

== State politics ==
Clothier was elected to the Western Australian Legislative Assembly at the 1933 state election, defeating incumbent Nationalist state government minister and former ALP premier John Scaddan. He was defeated after a single term at the 1936 election, losing to independent candidate Harry Hearn.

== Federal politics ==
At the 1937 federal election, Clothier was elected to a six-year Senate term beginning on 1 July 1938. Senate along with two other ALP candidates, James Cunningham and James Fraser.

== Personal life ==
Clothier married Ethel Gluyas in 1905, with whom he had a son and a daughter. He was widowed in 1961, and was also predeceased by his son. He died at Royal Perth Hospital on 31 May 1964 and was cremated at Karrakatta Cemetery.
