= Fred Book =

Australian rules footballer, born 1905

Frederick David Book (born 1905, died 1990) was an Australian rules football administrator and City of Perth Councillor.

In 1928 Book was elected Treasurer of the East Perth Football Club. Retiring in 1973 he had served the club in different roles for a total of 45 years including a record 20 years as club president.

It is Book who is credited with saving Perth Oval from being acquired by the army for use as a depot. In 1956 as a tribute to his service to the club, the new grandstand was named in his honour. The F.D. Book Stand still stands to this day although Perth Oval is no longer used for Australian rules football. He also had East Perth's best and fairest award, the F. D. Book Medal, named in his honour.

Book was elected to the City of Perth council in 1940.

At the 1950 state election, Book stood for the Liberal and Country League in the seat of East Perth, but was defeated by the sitting Labor member, Herb Graham.
