= Bob Marshall (billiards player) =

Australian billiards player

- Born: 10 April 1910; Kalgoorlie, Western Australia
- Died: 23 February 2004 (aged 93); Perth, Western Australia
- Occupations: Billiards player, politician

- Sport country: Australia
- IBSF World Billiards Champion: 1936, 1938, 1951, 1962 (as the World Amateur Billiards Championship)

Robert James Percival Marshall, OAM (10 April 1910 – 23 February 2004) was a noted Australian amateur player of English billiards and a politician. He won the World Amateur Billiards Championship in 1936, 1938, 1951 and 1962 and was runner-up three times, as well as a national snooker champion.

Marshall was born in Kalgoorlie, the same town as another legend of the game, Walter Lindrum. Throughout his career he was compared favourably with Lindrum who, in 1954, himself declared that Marshall was one of the greatest amateur players he had ever seen. Ten years later, the contemporary English snooker professional Fred Davis said of Marshall, "Most noticeable about his style is his compactness, so like Walter Lindrum, and the shortness of his back-swing, hardly more than a couple of inches."

Marshall dominated amateur billiards before and after the war with a career that spanned six decades, broken by retirements in 1963 and 1970 followed by come-backs.

From 1965 to 1968, Marshall served as a member of the Western Australian Legislative Assembly for the Liberal Party.

== Career ==
Marshall's first job was as a hairdresser, and he later opened a successful dry-cleaning outlet. He became the World Amateur Champion for the first time in 1936, and took the title again in 1938. During World War II, he spent four years in the Royal Australian Air Force. In 1951 he again won the World Amateur Championship, and in 1952 was runner-up. He took another World 2nd place in 1954. In 1953 while playing his regular rival Tom Cleary in the final of the Australian Championship he compiled a break of 702; the then-highest ever made by an amateur in a championship match. This record remained unbeaten until 1984 when Subhash Agarwal compiled a 716 break. Matthew Bolton has since broken those records with breaks of 809 (2017), 736 (2014) and 831 (2012).

In 1962 Marshall was invited to India to compete in the national billiards and snooker titles. He won both.

He entered politics in 1965 when he won the seat of Maylands in the state election for the Liberal party. In 1969 he made a comeback for a series of exhibition matches against New Zealand professional Clark McConachy and regained his Australian title the same year, defending it successfully in 1970 before retiring once again.

In 1985 he won the Australian title at the age of 75. This success encouraged him to travel to New Delhi, India for an attempt at his fifth world title where he won all matches except the final which was taken by rising Indian champion Geet Sethi, Marshall actually led after the first two hours of the six hour final. The following year he won the Australian title again, his 21st, and retired shortly afterwards: 50 years after his first Australian title win.

His best break was 1,056 which he made in practice in 49 minutes. In the 1953 Australian championships he made a break of 702 in 37 minutes. He twice recorded seven breaks of 100 or more in a two-hour session and in the 1938 World Championship final in Melbourne, made a break of 335 in just over 15 minutes. He used "top-of-the-table" techniques for his break-building, and all of his records were made under the "two-pot rule". Other records by Marshall which still stand under the two-pot limitation include: the highest aggregate in two hours play (1,876), four hours (3,391), and a two-hour session average of 118.7.

== Snooker ==
As a snooker player, he contested four Australian amateur finals, and was Australian National Champion in 1956. His best break was 139.

== Awards and honours ==
In 1963 he was named Western Australian Sportsman of the Year, and in 1980 was awarded the Order of Australia (OAM). He was inducted into the Western Australian Hall of Champions in 1985.

He served a single term as the Liberal member for Maylands in the Western Australian Legislative Assembly from 1965 to 1968.

Since his death at the age of 93, the memorial Bob Marshall Medal is awarded each year by the Australian Billiards & Snooker Council. His biography My Life and Times was written with Cyril Ayris and Ross Haig.

Awarded the Australian Sports Medal on 2 November 2000.
