= Tom Hartrey =

Australian politician

Thomas Augustine Hartrey MBE (31 January 1901 – 17 November 1983) was an Australian politician. He was the Labor member for Boulder-Dundas in the Western Australian Legislative Assembly from 1971 to 1977.
