= James Hegney =

Australian politician

The Honourable James Hegney

16th Speaker of the Legislative Assembly of Western Australia
- In office 2 August 1956 – 29 June 1959
- Preceded by: Aloysius Rodoreda
- Succeeded by: John Hearman

Member of the Legislative Assembly of Western Australia
- In office 12 April 1930 – 15 March 1947
- Preceded by: None (new creation)
- Succeeded by: Bill Grayden
- Constituency: Middle Swan
- In office 25 March 1950 – 31 March 1962
- Preceded by: Bill Grayden
- Succeeded by: None (abolished)
- Constituency: Middle Swan
- In office 31 March 1962 – 23 March 1968
- Preceded by: None (new creation)
- Succeeded by: Colin Jamieson
- Constituency: Belmont

Personal details
- Born: 27 September 1891 North Melbourne, Victoria, Australia
- Died: 5 May 1970 (aged 78) Wembley, Western Australia, Australia
- Party: Labor

James Hegney (27 September 1891 – 5 May 1970) was an Australian politician who was a Labor Party member of the Legislative Assembly of Western Australia from 1930 to 1947 and again from 1950 to 1968. He served as Speaker of the Legislative Assembly from 1956 to 1959.

== Early life ==
Hegney was born in Melbourne, as was his younger brother Bill Hegney (also a future MP). The brothers came to Western Australia as children, where their father worked for Western Australian Government Railways. After leaving school, Hegney worked as a boilermaker at the Midland Railway Workshops, and was a member of the Boilermakers' Union. He also played high-level Australian rules football, appearing in 23 games for the Midland Junction Football Club (a West Australian Football League club) between 1909 and 1910.

== Politics ==
Hegney stood for parliament at the 1930 state election, and was elected to the new seat of Middle Swan. After the 1933 election, Hegney was appointed deputy chairman of committees in the Labor government. He remained in the role until the 1947 election, when he was narrowly defeated in his seat by Bill Grayden, the Liberal candidate. Hegney regained Middle Swan at the 1950 election, and after Labor's victory at the 1953 election was made chairman of committees in the Hawke government. He was elevated to the speakership after the 1956 election, replacing Aloysius Rodoreda, and remained speaker until the Labor government's defeat at the 1959 election. Hegney switched to the seat of Belmont at the 1962 election, and remained in parliament until retiring at the 1968 election.

== See also ==
- Members of the Western Australian Legislative Assembly

Parliament of Western Australia
Preceded by None (new creation); Bill Grayden	Member for Middle Swan; 1930–1947; 1950–1962	Succeeded by Bill Grayden; None (abolished)
New creation	Member for Belmont; 1962–1968	Succeeded by Colin Jamieson
Preceded by Aloysius Rodoreda	Speaker of the Legislative Assembly; 1956–1959	Succeeded by John Hearman
