= Charlie Oliver (trade unionist) =

Australian trade unionist and politician

Charlie Oliver AM

Member of the Legislative Assembly of Western Australia
- In office 4 December 1948 – 16 August 1951
- Preceded by: Philip Collier
- Succeeded by: Arthur Moir
- Constituency: Boulder

Personal details
- Born: 23 December 1901 Bangor, Carnarvonshire, Wales
- Died: 24 February 1990 (aged 88) Caringbah, New South Wales, Australia
- Party: Labor

Cecil Thompson "Charlie" Oliver AM (23 December 1901 – 24 February 1990) was an Australian trade unionist and politician. He was a Labor Party member of the Legislative Assembly of Western Australia from 1948 to 1951, representing the seat of Boulder, and was later prominent in the labour movement in New South Wales as the state secretary (1951–1978) and state president (1980–1985) of the Australian Workers' Union.

Oliver was born in Bangor, Carnarvonshire, Wales, to Elizabeth (née Thompson) and John Murray Oliver. His family moved to England when he was a child, living first in Chester and later in Liverpool. He left school at the age of 13 to work as an agricultural labourer, and emigrated to Western Australia after World War I with an older brother. Oliver initially settled in Meekatharra, where he worked as a miner, and later also lived in Koolanooka, Perenjori, and Big Bell. He joined the Australian Workers' Union (AWU) in 1923, and in 1942 accepted a position as a district-level organiser.

In 1943, Oliver was appointed state secretary of the AWU's mining division, which was based in Boulder. He entered parliament at the 1948 Boulder by-election, which had been caused by the death of Philip Collier (a former premier). His chief opponent was the Liberal Party candidate, Billy Snedden, who was a future federal Leader of the Opposition. Oliver was re-elected unopposed at the 1950 state election, but felt under-utilised in parliament, and in mid-1951 resigned to accept a position as the AWU's New South Wales state secretary.

Oliver remained AWU state secretary until 1978, helping to improve the union's finances and membership numbers. He then served as AWU state president from 1980 to 1985. Oliver also served as ALP state vice-president during the 1955 party split, and was credited with helping to reduce its impact. He was elected state president of the party in 1960, and remained in the position until his voluntary resignation in 1970, although the party won only a single state election during that time (in 1962). In retirement, Oliver lived in Sydney, dying there in February 1990 (aged 88). He had been made a Member of the Order of Australia (AM) in 1984, "for services to trade unionism".

Parliament of Western Australia
Preceded by Philip Collier	Member for Boulder; 1948–1951	Succeeded by Arthur Moir
