= 1947 Western Australian state election =

- 15 March 1947

All 50 seats in the Western Australian Legislative Assembly 26 Assembly seats were needed for a majority
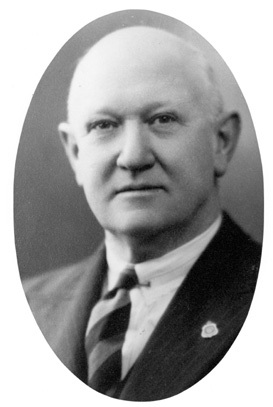

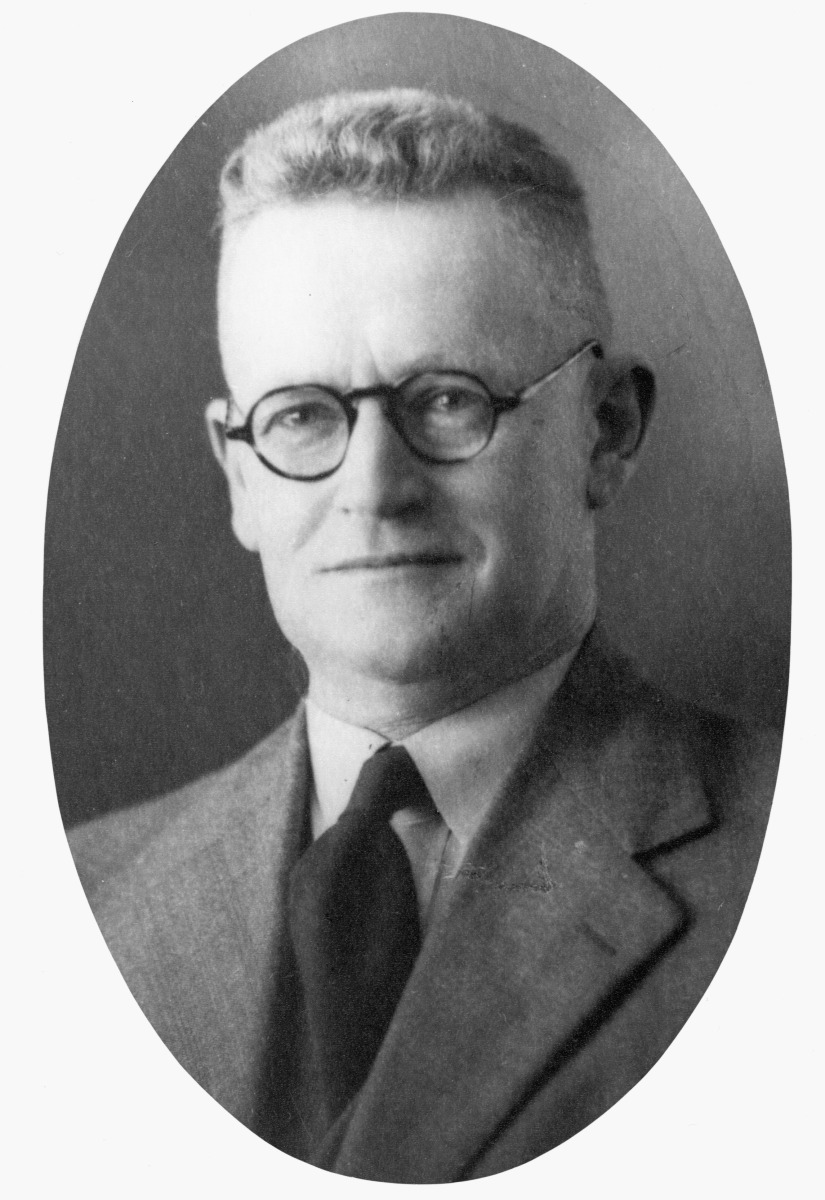
	First party	Second party
Leader	Ross McLarty	Frank Wise
Party	Liberal/Country coalition	Labor
Leader since	14 December 1946	31 July 1945
Leader's seat	Murray-Wellington	Gascoyne
Last election	17 seats	30 seats
Seats won	25 seats	23 seats
Seat change	▲8	▼7
Percentage	51.40%	39.38%
Swing	▲14.70	▼3.90
Premier before election
Frank Wise
Labor
Resulting Premier
Ross McLarty
Liberal/Country coalition

Elections were held in the state of Western Australia on 15 March 1947 to elect all 50 members to the Legislative Assembly. The result was a hung parliament—the four-term Labor government, led by Premier Frank Wise, was defeated with a swing of approximately 7%. The Liberal-Country Coalition won exactly half of the seats, one short of a majority, needed the support of the Independent members Harry Shearn and William Read to govern.

The election was the Liberal Party's first major showing since its formation in 1944-1945 out of the former Nationalist Party. Coincidental with this, in 1944, was the significant change in the fortunes of the Country Party when the Primary Producers' Association, of which the Party had been the political wing, passed a motion during negotiations with the Wheatgrowers' Union deleting the rule which authorised the Party's existence and its use of PPA branches and funds for party purposes. A new organisation, was hastily set up by the Opposition Leader Arthur Watts and the member for Pingelly, Harrie Seward, who were very active in setting up branches to endorse local candidates and obtaining donations on which to run the 1947 campaign.

Despite leading the Opposition prior to the election Country Party leader Watts did not become Premier with the change of government. The Country Party had been the senior partner in the non-Labor Coalition for most of the 1930s and 1940s. However, the election saw the Country Party win one fewer seat than the Liberals. As a result, Liberal leader Ross McLarty became Premier, with Watts as his deputy. It is one instance in which an Opposition leader did not become Premier with an election producing a change of government. This was the start of a significant decline in the Country Party's fortunes over the ensuing decades; the party, now the WA Nationals, has never won more than nine seats at an election since.

As of 2024, this was the last Western Australian state election that the Country Party/National party received over 10% of the vote.

== Results ==
Western Australian state election, 15 March 1947 Legislative Assembly << 1943–1950 >>
Enrolled voters	194,270^{[1]}				
Votes cast	166,905		Turnout	85.91%	–0.63%
Informal votes	3,415		Informal	2.05%	–0.43%
Summary of votes by party
Party	Primary votes	%	Swing	Seats	Change
Labor	61,059	37.35%	–5.93%	23	– 7
Liberal	57,621	35.24%	+10.96%	13	+ 6
Country and Democratic League	26,416	16.16%	+3.74%	12	+ 2
West Australia Party	556	0.34%	*	0	0
Independent Labor	3,318	2.03%	–0.64%	0	0
Independent Liberal	2,321	1.42%	+0.54%	0	0
Communist	1,641	1.00%	+0.60%	0	0
Progressive	89	0.05%	+0.05%	0	± 0
Independent	10,469	6.4%	–2.61%	1	± 0
Independent Nationalists	0	0.00	-2.96	1	0
Total	163,490			50	

^{1} 297,089 electors were enrolled to vote at the election, but 20 seats (40% of the total) were uncontested—15 Labor seats (four more than 1943) representing 71,732 enrolled voters, 2 Liberal seats (one more than the Nationalists in 1943) representing 12,765 voters, 2 Country seats representing 8,678 voters, and one Independent Nationalist seat representing 9,644 voters.
^{2} The figure for the Independent Nationalist label is likely to be artificially low as the successful candidate for Maylands, Harry Shearn, won unopposed. He won the seat under the same label with 4,966 votes in 1939, 4,342 votes in 1943 and 5,060 votes in 1950.

== See also ==
- Candidates of the 1947 Western Australian state election
- Members of the Western Australian Legislative Assembly, 1943–1947
- Members of the Western Australian Legislative Assembly, 1947–1950
