= Electoral district of Middle Swan =

Former state electoral district in Perth, Western Australia

Middle Swan Western Australia—Legislative Assembly
- State: Western Australia
- Dates current: 1930–1962
- Namesake: Swan River

Middle Swan was an electoral district of the Legislative Assembly in the Australian state of Western Australia from 1930 to 1962.

The district was located in the eastern suburbs of Perth. Despite its name, it did not include its namesake suburb (its name came from being centrally located along the Swan River), but included areas such as Bayswater, Morley, Inglewood and parts of Maylands north of the river, and Belmont, Rivervale and Lathlain south of the river.

First created for the 1930 state election, the seat was won by James Hegney of the Labor Party. Hegney held the seat until his defeat by Liberal Party candidate Bill Grayden at the 1947 state election. Grayden resigned the seat mid-term to contest, successfully, the division of Swan at the 1949 federal election. No by-election was called due to the proximity of the 1950 state election, which saw Hegney win back his old seat. Hegney then held the seat until its abolition at the 1962 state election, at which point he became the member for the new seat of Belmont. Hegney served as Speaker of the Western Australian Legislative Assembly between 1956 and 1959.

== Members for Middle Swan ==
Member	Party	Term
James Hegney	Labor	1930–1947
Bill Grayden	Liberal	1947–1949
James Hegney	Labor	1950–1962
