= Harry Shearn =

Australian politician

Member of the Legislative Assembly of Western Australia
- In office 15 February 1936 – 21 January 1951
- Preceded by: Robert Clothier
- Succeeded by: Edward Oldfield
- Constituency: Maylands

Personal details
- Born: 28 April 1892 Guildford, Western Australia, Australia
- Died: 21 January 1951 (aged 58) Perth, Western Australia, Australia
- Party: Independent

Harry Vivian Shearn (28 April 1892 – 21 January 1951) was an Australian politician who was an independent member of the Legislative Assembly of Western Australia from 1936 until his death, representing the seat of Maylands.

Shearn was born in Guildford, Western Australia, to Matilda Anne (née Connolly) and Michael Shearn. He worked for his father's real estate agency after leaving school, and took it over completely following his father's death in 1917. Shearn was elected to the Perth Road Board in 1930, and served as chairman from 1935 to 1936. He entered parliament at the 1936 state election, winning Maylands from the Labor Party's Robert Clothier.

After the 1947 state election produced a hung parliament, Shearn and another independent, William Read, gave their support to the Liberal Party, allowing Ross McLarty to form a government. The situation persisted after the 1950 election, albeit with the support of another independent, David Grayden. Shearn died suddenly in January 1951, aged 58. He had married Emily Ann Watts in 1918, with whom he had two children, Hartley Vivian (Viv) and Marian (Lorraine).

== See also ==
- Independent politicians in Australia

Parliament of Western Australia
Preceded by Robert Clothier	Member for Maylands; 1936–1951	Succeeded by Edward Oldfield
