= Leonard Hill (politician) =

Australian politician

Leonard Louis Hill (22 November 1886 – 21 July 1963) was an Australian politician and member of the Country Party.

He was the Member for the Electoral district of Albany, in Western Australia, from 1936 to 1956.
