= Philip Collier =

Western Australian politician (1873–1948)

The Honourable Philip Collier
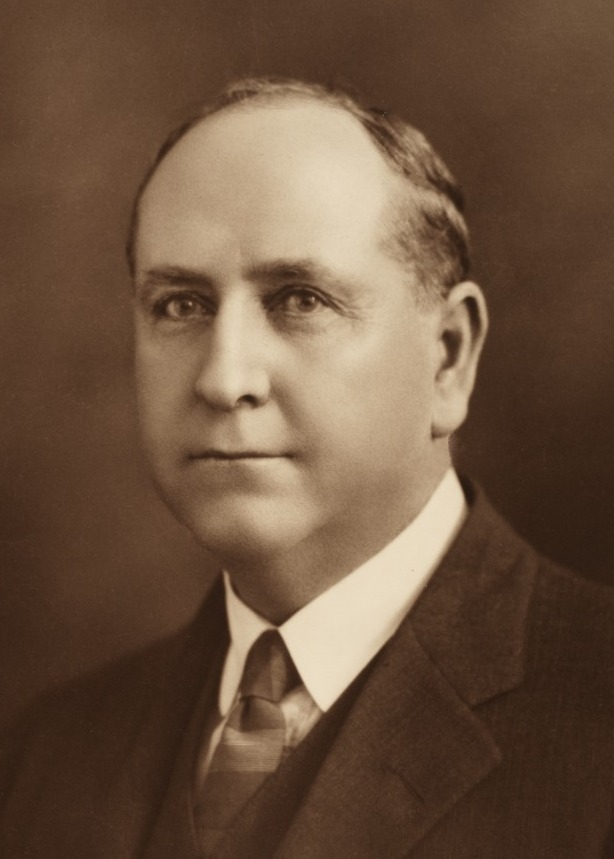

14th Premier of Western Australia
- In office 17 April 1924 – 23 April 1930
- Monarch: George V
- Governor: Francis Newdegate; William Campion
- Preceded by: James Mitchell
- Succeeded by: James Mitchell
- In office 24 April 1933 – 19 August 1936
- Monarchs: George V Edward VIII
- Governor: none (Note: Following the end of William Campion's term in 1931, it was decided not to appoint another governor, to save money during the Depression. The lieutenant-governor exercised viceregal authority until 1948, when a new governor was appointed. The two lieutenant-governors during Collier's second term as premier were John Northmore and James Mitchell.)
- Preceded by: James Mitchell
- Succeeded by: John Willcock

Leader of the Labor Party in Western Australia
- In office 16 April 1917 – 16 August 1936
- Preceded by: John Scaddan
- Succeeded by: John Willcock

Member of the Legislative Assembly of Western Australia
- In office 27 October 1905 – 18 October 1948
- Preceded by: John Hopkins
- Succeeded by: Charlie Oliver
- Constituency: Boulder

Personal details
- Born: 21 April 1873 Woodstock, Victoria, Australia
- Died: 18 October 1948 (aged 75) Mount Lawley, Western Australia
- Party: Labor

Philip Collier (21 April 1873 – 18 October 1948) was an Australian politician who served as the 14th Premier of Western Australia from 1924 to 1930 and from 1933 to 1936. He was leader of the Labor Party from 1917 to 1936, and is Western Australia's longest-serving premier from that party.

Collier was born in Victoria and came to Western Australia to work in the mines. He became involved in the union movement on the Eastern Goldfields, and entered parliament at the 1905 state election, winning the seat of Boulder (which he retained for the rest of his life). In 1911, Collier became a minister in the government of John Scaddan. He replaced Scaddan as Labor leader in 1917, in the aftermath of the split over conscription, and became premier when Labor won the 1924 state election. Collier's government was returned to office three years later, but was defeated at the 1930 election. Nevertheless Collier continued to lead the state ALP, and regained the premiership after a Labor landslide in 1933, serving until his retirement in 1936.

As premier, Collier enjoyed a stability that had been absent from previous Labor administrations in Western Australia. His government was on good terms with trade unions, and its improvements to industrial arbitration laws have been credited with reducing the number of industrial disputes relative to other states. It also had various workers' rights enshrined in legislation, including a basic wage and a 40-hour week. Collier himself was a political moderate, and borrowed policies from his predecessors in certain areas, notably rural development. Later writers have praised his statesmanship and his skilled handling of his opponents, both inside and outside his party.

== Early life ==
Philip Collier was born at Woodstock near Melbourne on 21 April 1873. The son of a farmer of the same name, he was educated locally but left school at the age of 16. He spent some time gold mining at Steiglitz, Victoria and then in New South Wales, and was later construction foreman of the Greater Melbourne Sewage Company at Northcote. On 27 June 1900, he married Ellen Heagney, with whom he had two sons and two daughters.

Collier began to take an interest in the labor movement, joining the Labor Party and becoming founding secretary of the Northcote branch of the Political Labor Council. He was campaign director for at least three Labor candidates in State and Federal election, including Frank Anstey.

In 1904, Collier moved to Western Australia. He worked in the mines of the Perseverance Goldmining Company for around a year, becoming a member of the Boulder branch of the Amalgamated Workers' Association, and vice-president of the Goldfields Trades and Labour Council.

== Political career ==
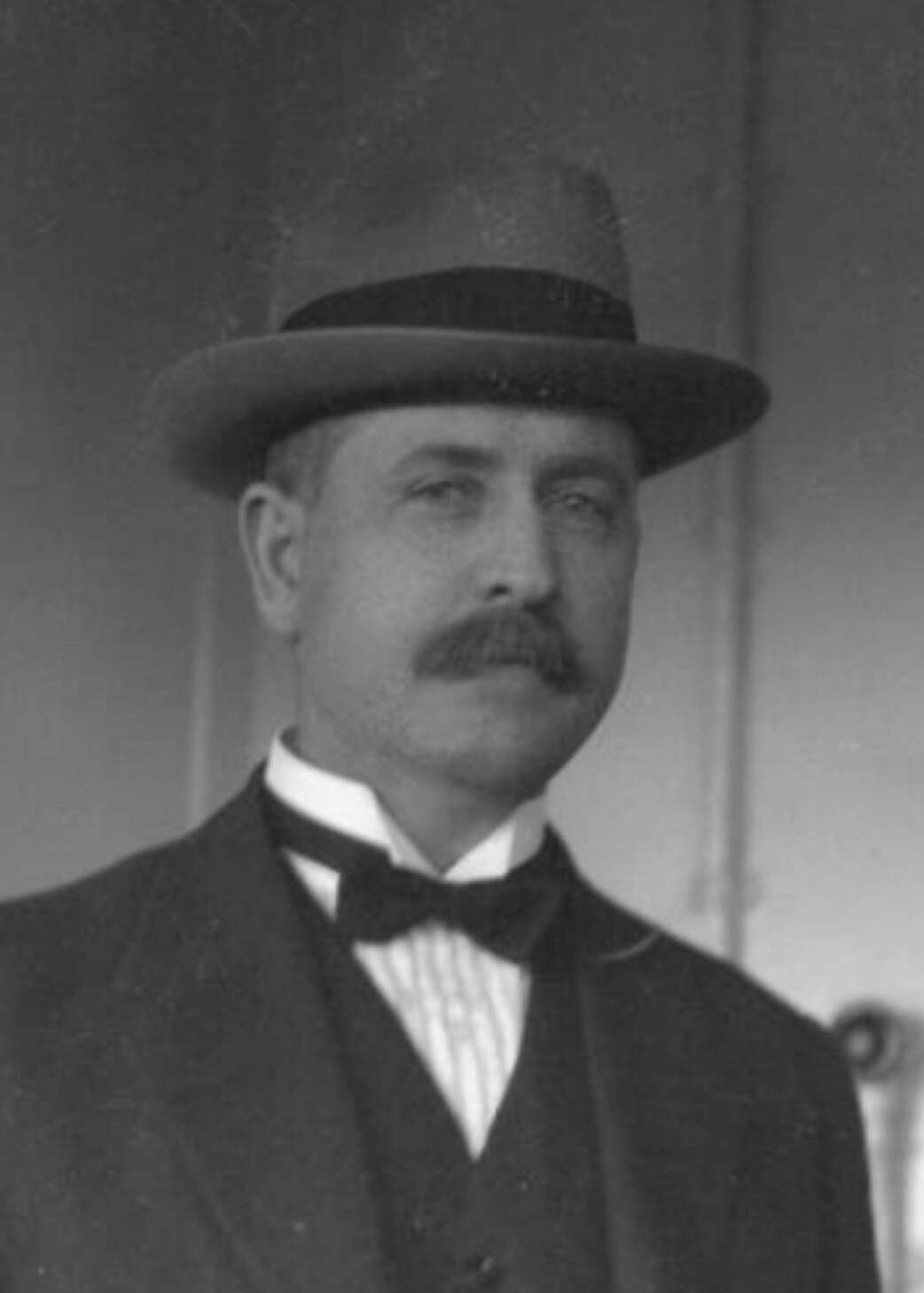
Collier in 1924

On 27 October 1905, Collier was elected to the Western Australian Legislative Assembly for the seat of Boulder. He retained the seat until his death nearly 43 years later. He was appointed Minister for Mines and Minister for Railways in the Scaddan Ministry on 7 October 1911, exchanging the Railways portfolio for Water Supplies on 23 November 1914. He retained these portfolios until the defeat of the Scaddan government on 17 July 1916. In April the following year, Scaddan resigned from the Australian Labor Party in support of Billy Hughes's pro-conscriptionist stance, and on 9 May Collier was elected to take his place as Leader of the Labor Party and therefore Leader of the Opposition.

Collier retained the leadership of the Labor party throughout the Liberal and nationalist governments of Frank Wilson, Henry Lefroy, Hal Colebatch and James Mitchell. During this time Collier joined with John Curtin and J. J. Simons in leading an anti-conscription campaign. His public comments got him in trouble with censors a number of times, and on one occasion he was charged under the War Precautions Regulations 1915 for making "statements likely to prejudice recruiting of his Majesties forces" and "statements likely to cause disaffection to his Majesty" at Kalgoorlie on 12 August 1917. The magistrate of Kalgoorlie, William Walter, fined him £25 for making statements likely to discourage recruiting.

On 17 April 1924, the Labor party had a landslide election victory, and Collier became Premier, Treasurer and Minister for Forests. The Labor party was defeated by Mitchell in the election of 23 April 1930, whereupon Collier resumed as Leader of the Opposition. He won another term as Premier in the election of 24 April 1933. Simultaneously with the election, a referendum had been held in which the people of Western Australia had overwhelmingly voted in favour of secession from the Commonwealth of Australia. Although the Labor party opposed secession, Collier nonetheless agreed to act on the result of the referendum by petitioning the British government for secession. The British government's refusal to act can be partly attributed to the fact that any action taken would have been in opposition to the new Government's wishes.

During Collier's time as premier, much was done to foster rural development. This included an agricultural bank which, as noted by one historian, "made generous advances to farmers." The government also introduced preference to unionists and a 44-hour week for most of its own employees.

Collier resigned as premier and leader of the Labor party on 19 August 1936, handing over to John Willcock. His 19-year term as parliamentary leader of the Australian Labor Party remains the longest ever, as does his 9-year term as Labor premier. Victor Courtney (1956) describes him as "the only person Labor [sic] produced in State politics who could fairly claim to have approached statesmanship". Mitchell and Collier are together credited with achieving an unusual degree of friendship and cooperation between parties during the 1920s and 1930s, which was most clearly demonstrated by Collier recommending Mitchell's appointment as Lieutenant-Governor in 1933.

Although no longer serving as a minister, Collier remained in parliament for a further twelve years, and was Father of the House from March 1939. He died at Mount Lawley on 18 October 1948, and was buried in Karrakatta Cemetery. Collier Road in the north-eastern suburbs of Perth is named after Collier.

== Notes ==
Preceded by Sir James Mitchell	Premier of Western Australia; 1924–1930	Succeeded by Sir James Mitchell
Preceded by Sir James Mitchell	Premier of Western Australia; 1933–1936	Succeeded by John Willcock
