= Electoral district of Boulder =

Former state electoral district of Western Australia

Boulder Western Australia—Legislative Assembly
- State: Western Australia
- Dates current: 1901–1977
- Namesake: Boulder

Footnotes
- ^{1} known as Boulder-Eyre 1962–1968; Boulder-Dundas 1968–1977

Boulder was an electoral district of the Legislative Assembly in the Australian state of Western Australia from 1901 to 1977.

The district was located in the Goldfields-Esperance region, and was based in the town of Boulder and its suburbs. After the 1961 redistribution, taking effect at the 1962 election, it took in some surrounding country areas.

The district's most famous member was Philip Collier of the Labor Party. Representing Boulder for 43 years, Collier served as Premier of Western Australia from 1924 to 1930, and again from 1933 to 1936.

== Members ==
Boulder (1901–1962)
Member	Party	Term
John Hopkins	Ministerial	1901–1905
Philip Collier	Labor	1905–1948
Charlie Oliver	Labor	1948–1951
Arthur Moir	Labor	1951–1962
Boulder-Eyre (1962–1968)
Arthur Moir	Labor	1962–1968
Boulder-Dundas (1968–1977)
Arthur Moir	Labor	1968–1971
Tom Hartrey	Labor	1971–1977
