= 1950 Western Australian state election =

- 25 March 1950

All 50 seats in the Western Australian Legislative Assembly 26 Assembly seats were needed for a majority
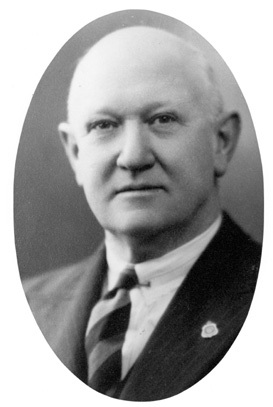

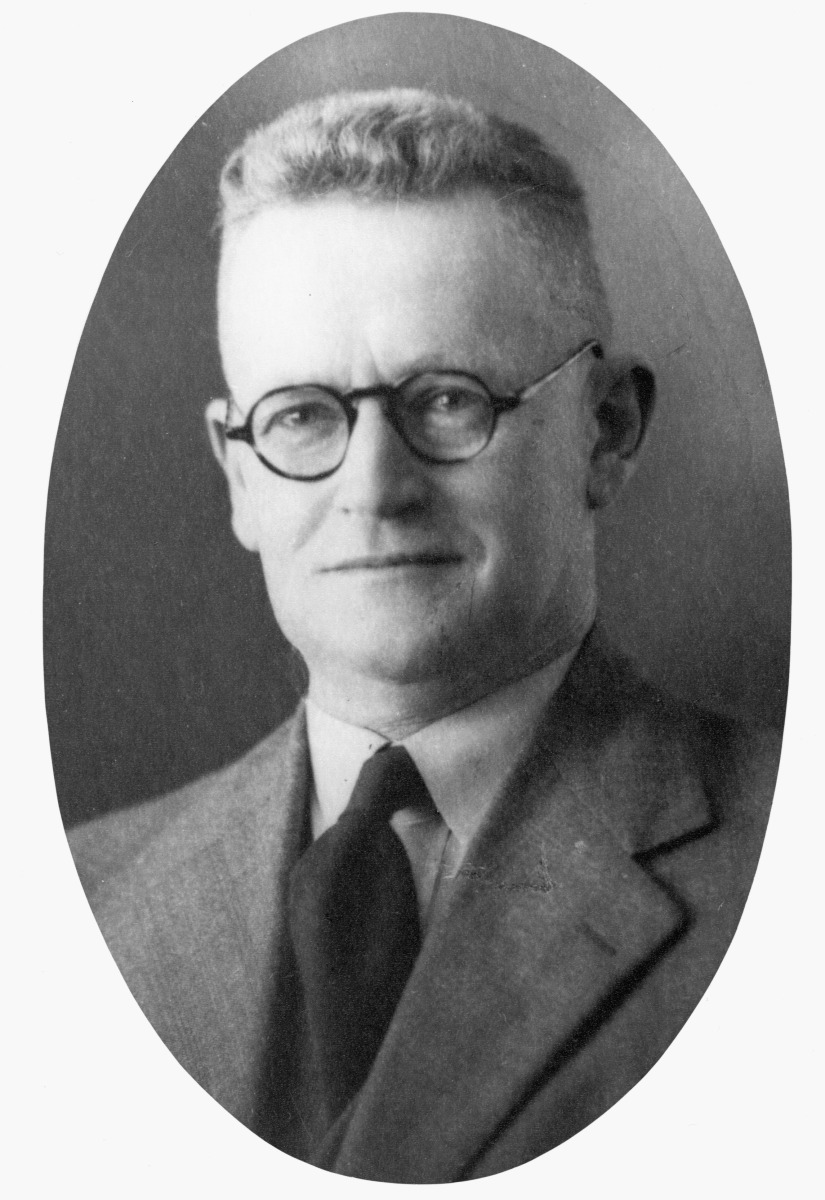
| | First party | Second party |
|---|---|---|
| Leader | Ross McLarty | Frank Wise |
| Party | Liberal/Country coalition | Labor |
| Leader since | 14 December 1946 | 31 July 1945 |
| Leader's seat | Murray-Wellington | Gascoyne |
| Last election | 25 seats | 23 seats |
| Seats won | 24 seats | 23 seats |
| Seat change | ▼1 | 0 |
| Percentage | 49.39% | 41.85% |
Premier before election
Ross McLarty
Liberal/Country coalition
Resulting Premier
Ross McLarty
Liberal/Country coalition

Elections were held in the state of Western Australia on 25 March 1950 to elect all 50 members to the Legislative Assembly. The Liberal-Country coalition government, led by Premier Ross McLarty, won a second term in office against the Labor Party, led by Opposition Leader Frank Wise.

The election took place after a major redistribution.

== Key dates ==
| Date | Event |
|---|---|
| 8 February 1950 | Writs were issued by the Governor to proceed with an election. |
| 17 February 1950 | Close of nominations in the North West area. |
| 3 March 1950 | Close of nominations in all other areas. |
| 25 March 1950 | Polling day, between the hours of 8am and 6pm. |
| 6 April 1950 | The McLarty–Watts Ministry was reconstituted. |
| 14 April 1950 | The writ was returned and the results formally declared. |

== Results ==
Western Australian state election, 25 March 1950 Legislative Assembly << 1947–1953 >>
| Enrolled voters | 247,589^{[1]} | | | | |
| Votes cast | 229,298 | | Turnout | 92.61% | +6.70% |
| Informal votes | 4,534 | | Informal | 1.98% | –0.07% |
Summary of votes by party
| Party | Primary votes | % | Swing | Seats | Change |
| Labor | 94,055 | 41.85% | | 23 | ± 0 |
| Liberal and Country | 90,089 | 40.08% | | 15 | + 2 |
| Country | 20,922 | 9.31% | | 9 | – 3 |
| Ind. Lib. | 5,059 | 2.25% | | 2 | + 1 |
| Communist | 815 | 0.36% | | 0 | ± 0 |
| Independent | 13,824 | 6.15% | | 1 | ± 0 |
| Total | 224,764 | | | 50 | |

^{1} 306,099 electors were enrolled to vote at the election, but 12 seats (24% of the total) were uncontested—6 Labor seats (9 less than 1947) representing 26,694 enrolled voters, 2 Liberal seats (the same as 1947) representing 13,278 enrolled voters, and 4 Country seats (two more than 1947) representing 18,538 enrolled voters. This change in distribution means that comparisons in vote percentages between 1947 and 1950 are largely meaningless; they have hence been omitted from the table.

== See also ==
- Candidates of the 1950 Western Australian state election
- Members of the Western Australian Legislative Assembly, 1947–1950
- Members of the Western Australian Legislative Assembly, 1950–1953
