= Electoral district of Maylands =

State electoral district of Western Australia

Maylands Western Australia—Legislative Assembly
- Interactive map of electoral district boundaries from the 2025 state election
- State: Western Australia
- Dates current: 1930–present
- MP: Dan Bull
- Party: Labor
- Namesake: Maylands
- Electors: 31,943 (2025)
- Area: 21 km^{2} (8.1 sq mi)
- Demographic: Metropolitan
- Coordinates: 31.92°S 115.91°E
Electorates around Maylands:
Mount Lawley	Morley	Bassendean
Mount Lawley	Maylands	Bassendean
Victoria Park	Belmont	Belmont

Maylands is a Legislative Assembly electorate in the state of Western Australia. Maylands is named for the inner northeastern Perth suburb of Maylands, which falls within its borders.

Formerly a fairly safe Liberal seat, it has been held by the Labor Party for all but one term since 1956. Since a redistribution prior to the 1968 election, it has been a safe Labor seat. In addition to incorporating old Labor areas, demographic change in the former Liberal strongholds of Maylands and Inglewood as young, educated and largely single working people moved in to replace an older, more affluent population has ensured the Labor vote over several decades, with the Green vote also increasing since the turn of the 21st Century.

== History ==
Maylands was created at the 1929 redistribution, at which five new metropolitan electorates were created to replace former Goldfields seats in Parliament. Its first member was elected at the 1930 election, giving an eighth and final term in Parliament to former premier John Scaddan, sitting as a Nationalist member. He was defeated at the 1933 election by a Labor candidate, but it reverted to an Independent Nationalist (later Liberal), Harry Shearn, who held the seat until his death on 25 January 1951. A redistribution in 1955 brought in suburbs in the Bayswater area, making the seat notionally Labor. Merv Toms won the seat for Labor at the 1956 election, while Edward Oldfield, the previous member, resigned from the Liberal Country League and held neighbouring Mount Lawley as an independent. After the 1961 redistribution, Toms elected to contest the new seat of Bayswater at the 1962 election, whilst Oldfield, who had since joined the Labor party, won Maylands, but narrowly lost it three years later. Another redistribution in 1966 changed the seat's status from marginal Liberal to safe Labor, and since John Harman's win at the 1968 election, it has been held by the Labor Party. Harman ended his 18-year political career with a three-year stint as Speaker of the Western Australian Legislative Assembly, and on his retirement, North Province MLC Peter Dowding moved from the Upper House into the seat. He became Premier of Western Australia on 25 February 1988 upon Brian Burke's retirement from politics. As the WA Inc scandal that came to be synonymous with his predecessor first became public knowledge then came to dominate political discourse in the State, Carmen Lawrence became premier on 12 February 1990, and he resigned from parliament two months later. At the resulting by-election, Judy Edwards, who later served as Environment Minister in the Gallop Cabinet, was successful in retaining the seat for Labor.

== Geography ==
Maylands is an odd-shaped seat, bounded by the Swan River to the south, Tonkin Highway to the east, Walter Road to the north and northwest, and Eighth and Central Avenue to the southwest. It includes all of Bedford and Embleton, almost all of Bayswater, Maylands and Inglewood, and small sections of Morley and Dianella. The Bayswater industrial area and Centro Galleria shopping centre are within the electorate's boundaries.

The 2007 redistribution, which took effect at the 2008 election, resulted in the seat losing a section of Morley and Dianella between Morley Drive and Walter Road, as well as a small section of western Maylands along Guildford Road.

== Members for Maylands ==
Member	Party	Term
John Scaddan	Nationalist	1930–1933
Robert Clothier	Labor	1933–1936
Harry Shearn	Ind. Nationalist	1936–1943
Harry Shearn	Independent	1943–1951
Edward Oldfield	LCL	1951–1956
Merv Toms	Labor	1956–1962
Edward Oldfield	Labor	1962–1965
Bob Marshall	LCL	1965–1968
John Harman	Labor	1968–1986
Peter Dowding	Labor	1986–1990
Judy Edwards	Labor	1990–2008
Lisa Baker	Labor	2008–2025
Dan Bull	Labor	2025–present

== Election results ==
2025 Western Australian state election: Maylands
Party	Candidate	Votes	%	±%
Labor	Dan Bull	13,471	50.8	−11.3
Greens	Caroline Marisa Perks	6,056	22.8	+6.7
Liberal	Paula Tan	5,743	21.7	+6.1
Christians	Gaye Burnett	720	2.7	+0.9
Libertarian	Peter Cornish	534	2.0	+2.0
Total formal votes		26,524	96.3	−0.2
Informal votes		1,033	3.7	+0.2
Turnout		27,557	86.5	+3.5
Two-party-preferred result
Labor	Dan Bull	19,214	72.5	−6.9
Liberal	Paula Tan	7,305	27.5	+6.9
Labor hold		Swing	−6.9	
