= Electoral results for the district of East Perth =

Western Australian district election results

This is a list of electoral results for the Electoral district of East Perth in Western Australian state elections.

== Members for East Perth ==
Member	Party	Term
Alfred Canning	Unaligned	1890–1894
Walter James	Opposition	1894–1904
John Hardwick	Ministerial	1904–1911
Titus Lander	Labor	1911–1914
John Hardwick	Liberal	1914–1917
John Hardwick	Nationalist	1917–1921
Jack Simons	Labor	1921–1922
Jack Simons	Independent	1922
Jack Simons	Nationalist	1922
Thomas Hughes	Labor	1922–1926
Thomas Hughes	Ind. Labor	1926–1927
James Kenneally	Labor	1927–1936
Thomas Hughes	Ind. Labor	1936–1943
Herb Graham	Labor	1943–1962

== Election results ==
=== Elections in the 1950s ===
1959 Western Australian state election: East Perth
Party	Candidate	Votes	%	±%
Labor	Herb Graham	3,557	49.6	−16.2
Liberal and Country	John Martin	2,835	39.6	+5.4
Democratic Labor	John Deane	773	10.8	+10.8
Total formal votes		7,165	97.8	0.0
Informal votes		163	2.2	0.0
Turnout		7,328	89.2	−0.2
Two-party-preferred result
Labor	Herb Graham	3,818	53.3	−12.5
Liberal and Country	John Martin	3,347	46.7	+12.5
Labor hold		Swing	−12.5	

1956 Western Australian state election: East Perth
Party	Candidate	Votes	%	±%
Labor	Herb Graham	5,273	65.8	
Liberal and Country	Edmund Madigan	2,739	34.2	
Total formal votes		8,012	97.8	
Informal votes		180	2.2	
Turnout		8,192	89.4	
Labor hold		Swing		

1953 Western Australian state election: East Perth
Party	Candidate	Votes	%	±%
Labor	Herb Graham	unopposed		
Labor hold		Swing		

1950 Western Australian state election: East Perth
Party	Candidate	Votes	%	±%
Labor	Herb Graham	5,592	63.9	
Liberal and Country	Fred Book	3,160	36.1	
Total formal votes		8,752	98.4	
Informal votes		140	1.6	
Turnout		8,892	89.1	
Labor hold		Swing		

=== Elections in the 1940s ===
1947 Western Australian state election: East Perth
Party	Candidate	Votes	%	±%
Labor	Herb Graham	3,731	57.8	−42.2
Independent Liberal	James Collins	2,321	36.0	+36.0
Communist	Henry Mountjoy	398	6.2	+6.2
Total formal votes		6,450	96.9	
Informal votes		209	3.1	
Turnout		6,659	86.9	
Labor hold		Swing	N/A	

- Preferences were not distributed.

1943 Western Australian state election: East Perth
Party	Candidate	Votes	%	±%
Labor	Herb Graham	unopposed		
Labor hold		Swing		

1943 East Perth state by-election
Party	Candidate	Votes	%	±%
Labor	Herb Graham	3,206	66.9	+20.7
Nationalist	Andrew Paterson	1,094	22.8	+22.8
Independent	Harold Callaghan	493	10.3	+10.3
Total formal votes		4,793	98.0	−0.4
Informal votes		99	2.0	+0.4
Turnout		4,892	73.0	−13.8
Labor gain from Independent		Swing	N/A	

- Preferences were not distributed.

=== Elections in the 1930s ===
1939 Western Australian state election: East Perth
Party	Candidate	Votes	%	±%
Labor	Robert Higgins	3,011	46.2	+9.4
Independent	Thomas Hughes	2,994	45.9	−17.3
Ind. Nationalist	Herbert Wells	511	7.8	+7.8
Total formal votes		6,516	98.4	−0.7
Informal votes		108	1.6	+0.7
Turnout		6,624	86.8	+15.8
Two-candidate-preferred result
Independent	Thomas Hughes	3,408	52.3	−10.9
Labor	Robert Higgins	3,108	47.7	+10.9
Independent hold		Swing	−10.9	

1936 East Perth state by-election
Party	Candidate	Votes	%	±%
Independent	Thomas Hughes	3,361	63.2	+22.1
Labor	James Kenneally	1,957	36.8	−9.0
Total formal votes		5,318	99.1	+1.0
Informal votes		49	0.9	−1.0
Turnout		5,367	71.0	+6.4
Independent hold		Swing	+11.1	

- This by-election was caused by the sitting member Thomas Hughes being declared bankrupt, and had to resign his seat. He settled his finances and was able to re-contest the seat in the by-election.

1936 Western Australian state election: East Perth
Party	Candidate	Votes	%	±%
Labor	James Kenneally	2,136	45.8	−15.8
Independent Labor	Thomas Hughes	1,919	41.1	+41.1
Independent	Felix Hughes	494	10.6	+10.6
Communist	Wilfred Mountjoy	118	2.5	+2.5
Total formal votes		4,667	98.1	+1.7
Informal votes		92	1.9	−1.7
Turnout		4,759	64.6	−23.1
Two-candidate-preferred result
Independent Labor	Thomas Hughes	2,433	52.1	
Labor	James Kenneally	2,234	47.9	
Independent Labor gain from Labor		Swing	N/A	

1933 Western Australian state election: East Perth
Party	Candidate	Votes	%	±%
Labor	James Kenneally	3,843	61.6	+1.5
Nationalist	William Murray	1,961	31.4	+31.4
Independent	Carlyle Ferguson	440	7.1	+7.1
Total formal votes		6,244	96.4	−2.2
Informal votes		232	3.6	+2.2
Turnout		6,476	87.7	+25.7
Labor hold		Swing	N/A	

- Preferences were not distributed.

1930 Western Australian state election: East Perth
Party	Candidate	Votes	%	±%
Labor	James Kenneally	2,580	60.1	
Independent Labor	Thomas Hughes	1,714	39.9	
Total formal votes		4,294	98.6	
Informal votes		60	1.4	
Turnout		4,354	62.0	
Labor hold		Swing		

=== Elections in the 1920s ===
1927 Western Australian state election: East Perth
Party	Candidate	Votes	%	±%
Labor	James Kenneally	3,197	53.5	−1.4
Nationalist	Charles Bull	1,104	18.5	−10.5
Nationalist	Thomas Ferguson	1,081	18.1	+1.9
Nationalist	Gerald Hartrey	597	10.0	+10.0
Total formal votes		5,979	98.0	−0.8
Informal votes		124	2.0	+0.8
Turnout		6,103	75.8	+14.5
Labor hold		Swing	N/A	

- Preferences were not distributed.

1924 Western Australian state election: East Perth
Party	Candidate	Votes	%	±%
Labor	Thomas Hughes	2,528	54.9	+7.1
Nationalist	Jack Simons	1,335	29.0	+10.0
Nationalist	Thomas Ferguson	746	16.2	0.0
Total formal votes		4,609	98.8	+0.8
Informal votes		54	1.2	−0.8
Turnout		4,663	61.3	−9.2
Labor hold		Swing	N/A	

1922 East Perth state by-election
Party	Candidate	Votes	%	±%
Labor	Thomas Hughes	1,354	36.0	−11.8
Nationalist	Jack Simons	1,177	31.3	+12.3
National Liberal	Charles Heppingstone	627	16.7	+16.7
Nationalist	James Franklin	599	15.9	+15.9
Total formal votes		3,757	98.2	+0.2
Informal votes		68	1.8	−0.2
Turnout		3,825	54.1	−16.4
Two-party-preferred result
Labor	Thomas Hughes	2,057	54.8	+3.0
Nationalist	Jack Simons	1,700	45.2	−3.0
Labor hold		Swing	+3.0	

- This by-election was caused by the resignation of sitting member Jack Simons after he changed to the Nationalists. He did not retain the seat.

1921 Western Australian state election: East Perth
Party	Candidate	Votes	%	±%
Labor	Jack Simons	2,182	47.8	+6.8
Nationalist	Charles Heppingstone	866	19.0	+3.0
National Labor	Thomas Ferguson	740	16.2	+3.7
Nationalist	John Hardwick	666	14.6	−5.3
Nationalist	William Henderson	112	2.4	+2.4
Total formal votes		4,566	98.0	+1.7
Informal votes		93	2.0	−1.7
Turnout		4,659	70.5	+10.6
Two-party-preferred result
Labor	Jack Simons	2,363	51.8	+3.2
Nationalist	Charles Heppingstone	2,203	48.2	−3.2
Labor gain from Nationalist		Swing	+3.2	

=== Elections in the 1910s ===
1917 Western Australian state election: East Perth
Party	Candidate	Votes	%	±%
Labor	Jack Simons	1,435	41.0	–18.0
National Liberal	John Hardwick	696	19.9	+2.3
Nationalist	Alfred Sims	558	16.0	+16.0
National Labor	Thomas Dunne	438	12.5	+12.5
Democratic	John Powell	370	10.6	+10.6
Total formal votes		3,497	96.3	–1.8
Informal votes		135	3.7	+1.8
Turnout		3,632	59.9	+10.0
Two-party-preferred result
National Liberal	John Hardwick	1,796	51.4	–1.3
Labor	Jack Simons	1,701	48.6	+1.3
National Liberal hold		Swing	–1.3	

1914 Western Australian state election: East Perth
Party	Candidate	Votes	%	±%
Labor	Titus Lander	1,949	44.3	−18.1
Liberal	Lewis Butt	812	18.4	+18.4
Liberal	John Hardwick	773	17.6	+17.6
Liberal	Henry Mills	647	14.7	−22.9
Liberal	Albert Keeley	221	5.0	+5.0
Total formal votes		4,402	98.1	−0.6
Informal votes		87	1.9	+0.6
Turnout		4,489	49.9	−24.0
Two-party-preferred result
Liberal	John Hardwick	2,321	52.7	+15.1
Labor	Titus Lander	2,081	47.3	−15.1
Liberal gain from Labor		Swing	+15.1	

1911 Western Australian state election: East Perth
Party	Candidate	Votes	%	±%
Labor	Titus Lander	2,282	62.4	
Ministerialist	Henry Mills	1,375	37.6	
Total formal votes		3,657	98.7	
Informal votes		47	1.3	
Turnout		3,704	73.9	
Labor gain from Ministerialist		Swing		

=== Elections in the 1900s ===
1908 Western Australian state election: East Perth
Party	Candidate	Votes	%	±%
Ministerialist	John Hardwick	887	39.1	−11.6
Labour	John Curran	538	23.7	−5.2
Ministerialist	Henry Mills	425	18.7	+18.7
Ministerialist	Henry Braidwood	344	15.2	+15.2
Ministerialist	Hugh McKernan	73	3.2	+3.2
Total formal votes		2,267	98.3	−0.7
Informal votes		38	1.7	+0.7
Turnout		2,305	63.0	+14.4
Two-party-preferred result
Ministerialist	John Hardwick	1,182	61.0	
Labour	John Curran	755	39.0	
Ministerialist hold		Swing	N/A	

1905 Western Australian state election: East Perth
Party	Candidate	Votes	%	±%
Ministerialist	John Hardwick	1,090	50.7	–4.6
Labour	Joseph Fabre	621	28.9	–15.8
Ministerialist	Frank Smalpage	437	20.3	+20.3
Total formal votes		2,148	99.0	±0.0
Informal votes		22	1.0	±0.0
Turnout		2,170	48.6	+15.8
Ministerialist hold		Swing	N/A	

1904 East Perth state by-election
Party	Candidate	Votes	%	±%
Opposition	John Hardwick	1,251	55.3	N/A
Labor	John Curran	1,013	44.7	−2.6
Total formal votes		2,264	99.0	+0.6
Informal votes		22	1.0	−0.6
Turnout		2,286	32.8	−5.9
Opposition gain from Ministerialist		Swing	N/A	

1904 Western Australian state election: East Perth
Party	Candidate	Votes	%	±%
Ministerialist	Walter James	1,396	52.7	–10.0
Labour	Edward Casson	1,253	47.3	+47.3
Total formal votes		2,649	98.4	–0.7
Informal votes		42	1.6	+0.7
Turnout		2,695	38.7	–0.9
Ministerialist hold		Swing	–10.0	

1901 Western Australian state election: East Perth
Party	Candidate	Votes	%	±%
Opposition	Walter James	614	62.7	–8.4
Opposition	Arthur Short	366	37.3	+37.3
Total formal votes		980	99.1	+1.9
Informal votes		9	0.9	–1.9
Turnout		989	39.6	+2.1
Opposition hold		Swing	–8.4	

=== Elections in the 1890s ===
1897 Western Australian colonial election: East Perth
Party	Candidate	Votes	%	±%
Opposition	Walter James	246	71.1	
Opposition	Archibald Sanderson	65	18.8	
Independent	Nicholas Raven	35	10.1	
Total formal votes		346	97.2	
Informal votes		10	2.8	
Turnout		356	37.5	
Opposition hold		Swing		

1894 Western Australian colonial election: East Perth
Party	Candidate	Votes	%	±%
National Education	Walter James	522	71.1	+71.1
Education Defence	Alfred Canning	212	28.9	–19.9

1890 Western Australian colonial election: East Perth
Party	Candidate	Votes	%	±%
None	Alfred Canning	179	48.8	n/a
None	Henry Saunders	163	44.4	n/a
None	William Nicholson	25	6.8	n/a
