= Results of the 1936 Western Australian state election (Legislative Assembly) =

Western Australian state election, 15 February 1936 Legislative Assembly << 1933–1939 >>
Enrolled voters	194,354^{[1]}				
Votes cast	136,309		Turnout	70.13%	–20.47%
Informal votes	1,518		Informal	1.11%	–1.12%
Summary of votes by party
Party	Primary votes	%	Swing	Seats	Change
Labor	57,055	42.33%	–3.15%	26	– 4
Nationalist	43,619	32.36%	+1.83%	8	± 0
Country	19,685	14.60%	+0.32%	13	+ 1
Ind. Nat.	3,418	2.54%	+1.33%	1	+ 1
Social Credit	1,385	1.03%	+1.03%	0	± 0
Communist	118	0.09%	–0.16%	0	± 0
Independent	9,431	7.00%	–1.21%	2	+ 2
Total	134,791			50	

This is a list of electoral district results of the 1936 Western Australian election.

== Results by electoral district ==
=== Albany ===
1936 Western Australian state election: Albany
Party	Candidate	Votes	%	±%
Labor	Arthur Wansbrough	1,285	38.7	−12.8
Country	Leonard Hill	1,260	37.9	+13.3
Independent	Charles Bolt	780	23.5	+23.5
Total formal votes		3,325	99.2	+0.4
Informal votes		26	0.8	−0.4
Turnout		3,351	75.9	−16.7
Two-party-preferred result
Country	Leonard Hill	1,917	57.6	
Labor	Arthur Wansbrough	1,408	42.4	
Country gain from Labor		Swing	N/A	

=== Avon ===
1936 Western Australian state election: Avon
Party	Candidate	Votes	%	±%
Country	Ignatius Boyle	1,301	52.9	+11.3
Country	Hugh Harling	1,160	47.1	+47.1
Total formal votes		2,461	98.0	+0.3
Informal votes		51	2.0	−0.3
Turnout		2,512	67.6	−24.2
Country hold		Swing	N/A	

=== Beverley ===
1936 Western Australian state election: Beverley
Party	Candidate	Votes	%	±%
Country	James Mann	1,514	54.6	−8.7
Country	Thomas Retalic	596	21.5	+21.5
Country	George Weaver	384	13.8	+13.8
Independent Country	John O'Dea	281	10.1	+10.1
Total formal votes		2,775	98.9	+0.4
Informal votes		31	1.1	−0.4
Turnout		2,806	72.1	−12.5
Country hold		Swing	N/A	

=== Boulder ===
1936 Western Australian state election: Boulder
Party	Candidate	Votes	%	±%
Labor	Philip Collier	unopposed		
Labor hold		Swing		

=== Brown Hill-Ivanhoe ===
1936 Western Australian state election: Brown Hill-Ivanhoe
Party	Candidate	Votes	%	±%
Labor	Frederick Smith	unopposed		
Labor hold		Swing		

=== Bunbury ===
1936 Western Australian state election: Bunbury
Party	Candidate	Votes	%	±%
Labor	Frederick Withers	2,136	60.2	+4.8
Nationalist	Cuthbert Butler	1,410	39.8	−4.8
Total formal votes		3,546	98.9	−0.1
Informal votes		38	1.1	+0.1
Turnout		3,584	71.8	−23.7
Labor hold		Swing	+4.8	

=== Canning ===
1936 Western Australian state election: Canning
Party	Candidate	Votes	%	±%
Labor	Charles Cross	3,299	48.6	+3.5
Nationalist	Herbert Wells	1,567	23.1	+0.6
Nationalist	Thomas Willsmore	988	14.6	+14.6
Independent	Carlyle Ferguson	728	10.7	+10.7
Ind. Nationalist	Oliver Strang	201	3.0	+3.0
Total formal votes		6,783	98.2	+1.5
Informal votes		125	1.8	−1.5
Turnout		6,908	71.2	−21.1
After distribution of preferences
Labor	Charles Cross	3,507	51.9	
Nationalist	Herbert Wells	1,938	28.7	
Nationalist	Thomas Willsmore	1,312	19.4	
Labor hold		Swing		

- Preferences were not distributed to completion.

=== Claremont ===
1936 Western Australian state election: Claremont
Party	Candidate	Votes	%	±%
Nationalist	Charles North	2,118	51.0	+8.5
Nationalist	Donald Cleland	2,039	49.0	+19.6
Total formal votes		4,157	98.6	+2.9
Informal votes		59	1.4	−2.9
Turnout		4,216	63.6	−28.0
Nationalist hold		Swing	N/A	

=== Collie ===
1936 Western Australian state election: Collie
Party	Candidate	Votes	%	±%
Labor	Arthur Wilson	unopposed		
Labor hold		Swing		

=== East Perth ===
1936 Western Australian state election: East Perth
Party	Candidate	Votes	%	±%
Labor	James Kenneally	2,136	45.8	−15.8
Independent Labor	Thomas Hughes	1,919	41.1	+41.1
Independent	Felix Hughes	494	10.6	+10.6
Communist	Wilfred Mountjoy	118	2.5	+2.5
Total formal votes		4,667	98.1	+1.7
Informal votes		92	1.9	−1.7
Turnout		4,759	64.6	−23.1
Two-candidate-preferred result
Independent Labor	Thomas Hughes	2,433	52.1	
Labor	James Kenneally	2,234	47.9	
Independent Labor gain from Labor		Swing	N/A	

=== Forrest ===
1936 Western Australian state election: Forrest
Party	Candidate	Votes	%	±%
Labor	May Holman	unopposed		
Labor hold		Swing		

=== Fremantle ===
1936 Western Australian state election: Fremantle
Party	Candidate	Votes	%	±%
Labor	Joseph Sleeman	3,429	74.0	−26.0
Nationalist	Aidan Bryan	1,204	26.0	+26.0
Total formal votes		4,633	98.7	
Informal votes		59	1.3	
Turnout		4,692	61.6	
Labor hold		Swing	N/A	

=== Gascoyne ===
1936 Western Australian state election: Gascoyne
Party	Candidate	Votes	%	±%
Labor	Frank Wise	683	81.4	+19.0
Country	Jack Pericles	156	18.6	+18.6
Total formal votes		839	99.5	+0.4
Informal votes		4	0.5	−0.4
Turnout		843	71.5	−11.9
Labor hold		Swing	+19.0	

=== Geraldton ===
1936 Western Australian state election: Geraldton
Party	Candidate	Votes	%	±%
Labor	John Willcock	1,933	60.6	−39.4
Country	Alfred Curlewis	1,256	39.4	+39.4
Total formal votes		3,189	99.4	
Informal votes		19	0.6	
Turnout		3,208	80.4	
Labor hold		Swing		

=== Greenough ===
1936 Western Australian state election: Greenough
Party	Candidate	Votes	%	±%
Country	William Patrick	1,727	51.4	+13.3
Independent Labor	John Garland	1,356	40.3	+40.3
Independent	Henry Carson	279	8.3	+8.3
Total formal votes		3,362	99.1	+0.7
Informal votes		32	0.9	−0.7
Turnout		3,394	61.7	−21.8
Country hold		Swing	N/A	

- Preferences were not distributed.

=== Guildford-Midland ===
1936 Western Australian state election: Guildford-Midland
Party	Candidate	Votes	%	±%
Labor	William Johnson	unopposed		
Labor hold		Swing		

=== Hannans ===
1936 Western Australian state election: Hannans
Party	Candidate	Votes	%	±%
Labor	Selby Munsie	unopposed		
Labor hold		Swing		

=== Irwin-Moore ===
1936 Western Australian state election: Irwin-Moore
Party	Candidate	Votes	%	±%
Country	Percy Ferguson	1,506	71.4	+17.3
Independent	Cyril Rodoreda	602	28.6	+28.6
Total formal votes		2,108	98.9	+0.7
Informal votes		23	1.1	−0.7
Turnout		2,131	64.6	−21.2
Country hold		Swing	N/A	

=== Kalgoorlie ===
1936 Western Australian state election: Kalgoorlie
Party	Candidate	Votes	%	±%
Labor	Herbert Styants	1,108	45.8	+45.8
Labor	James Cunningham	845	35.0	−30.2
Labor	Robert Elliott	465	19.2	+19.2
Total formal votes		2,418	98.7	+1.2
Informal votes		31	1.3	−1.2
Turnout		2,449	57.6	−31.8
Two-candidate-preferred result
Labor	Herbert Styants	1,356	56.1	
Labor	James Cunningham	1,062	43.9	
Labor hold		Swing	N/A	

=== Kanowna ===
1936 Western Australian state election: Kanowna
Party	Candidate	Votes	%	±%
Labor	Emil Nulsen	unopposed		
Labor hold		Swing		

=== Katanning ===
1936 Western Australian state election: Katanning
Party	Candidate	Votes	%	±%
Country	Arthur Watts	1,970	53.3	+40.4
Independent Country	Nelson Lemmon	1,726	46.7	+46.7
Total formal votes		3,696	98.9	+1.3
Informal votes		42	1.1	−1.3
Turnout		3,738	74.4	−17.7
Country hold		Swing	N/A	

=== Kimberley ===
1936 Western Australian state election: Kimberley
Party	Candidate	Votes	%	±%
Labor	Aubrey Coverley	496	84.5	+32.2
Country	Ronald Herrin	91	15.5	+15.5
Total formal votes		587	99.0	+0.7
Informal votes		6	1.0	−0.7
Turnout		593	62.5	−16.1
Labor hold		Swing	+32.2	

=== Leederville ===
1936 Western Australian state election: Leederville
Party	Candidate	Votes	%	±%
Labor	Alexander Panton	3,688	58.3	−0.1
Nationalist	Charles Veryard	2,638	41.7	+20.1
Total formal votes		6,326	98.9	+1.2
Informal votes		67	1.1	−1.2
Turnout		6,393	69.4	−24.3
Labor hold		Swing	N/A	

=== Maylands ===
1936 Western Australian state election: Maylands
Party	Candidate	Votes	%	±%
Labor	Robert Clothier	2,214	39.4	−3.4
Ind. Nationalist	Harry Shearn	1,630	29.0	+29.0
Nationalist	Tom Hartrey	921	16.4	+16.4
Nationalist	Arthur Daley	861	15.3	+15.3
Total formal votes		5,626	99.1	+1.0
Informal votes		52	0.9	−1.0
Turnout		5,678	74.1	−17.1
Two-candidate-preferred result
Ind. Nationalist	Harry Shearn	3,158	56.1	+56.1
Labor	Robert Clothier	2,468	43.9	−11.2
Ind. Nationalist gain from Labor		Swing	N/A	

=== Middle Swan ===
1936 Western Australian state election: Middle Swan
Party	Candidate	Votes	%	±%
Labor	James Hegney	3,061	58.8	−0.6
Nationalist	David Pyvis	2,148	41.2	+22.5
Total formal votes		5,209	98.7	+2.4
Informal votes		70	1.3	−2.4
Turnout		5,279	62.4	−27.9
Labor hold		Swing	N/A	

=== Mount Hawthorn ===
1936 Western Australian state election: Mount Hawthorn
Party	Candidate	Votes	%	±%
Labor	Harry Millington	2,751	54.0	−8.5
Nationalist	Arthur Abbott	2,345	46.0	+8.5
Total formal votes		5,096	99.1	+1.2
Informal votes		46	0.9	−1.2
Turnout		5,142	72.9	−21.4
Labor hold		Swing	−8.5	

=== Mount Magnet ===
1936 Western Australian state election: Mount Magnet
Party	Candidate	Votes	%	±%
Labor	Michael Troy	unopposed		
Labor hold		Swing		

=== Mount Marshall ===
1936 Western Australian state election: Mount Marshall
Party	Candidate	Votes	%	±%
Country	Frederick Warner	1,933	73.6	+18.8
Country	Joseph Diver	694	26.4	+26.4
Total formal votes		2,627	99.4	+0.4
Informal votes		17	0.6	−0.4
Turnout		2,644	62.2	−23.0
Country hold		Swing	N/A	

=== Murchison ===
1936 Western Australian state election: Murchison
Party	Candidate	Votes	%	±%
Labor	William Marshall	unopposed		
Labor hold		Swing		

=== Murray-Wellington ===
1936 Western Australian state election: Murray-Wellington
Party	Candidate	Votes	%	±%
Nationalist	Ross McLarty	unopposed		
Nationalist hold		Swing		

=== Nedlands ===
1936 Western Australian state election: Nedlands
Party	Candidate	Votes	%	±%
Nationalist	Norbert Keenan	3,966	59.1	+4.0
Labor	Dorothy Tangney	2,739	40.9	−4.0
Total formal votes		6,705	99.4	+0.7
Informal votes		41	0.6	−0.7
Turnout		6,746	68.8	−23.1
Nationalist hold		Swing	+4.0	

=== Nelson ===
1936 Western Australian state election: Nelson
Party	Candidate	Votes	%	±%
Independent	Clarence Doust	1,609	38.2	+38.2
Nationalist	John Smith	1,585	37.6	−1.2
Labor	Thomas Ladhams	1,018	24.2	−13.2
Total formal votes		4,212	99.0	+1.4
Informal votes		44	1.0	−1.4
Turnout		4,256	78.0	−11.0
Two-party-preferred result
Independent	Clarence Doust	2,406	57.1	+57.1
Nationalist	John Smith	1,806	42.9	−12.8
Independent gain from Nationalist		Swing	N/A	

=== North Perth ===
1936 Western Australian state election: North Perth
Party	Candidate	Votes	%	±%
Nationalist	James MacCallum Smith	1,559	32.7	−29.6
Labor	Edward Holman	1,462	30.7	+30.7
Nationalist	Reginald Miller	1,010	21.2	+21.2
Nationalist	Karl Drake-Brockman	730	15.3	+15.3
Total formal votes		4,761	99.0	+1.2
Informal votes		49	1.0	−1.2
Turnout		4,810	75.8	−16.4
Two-party-preferred result
Nationalist	James MacCallum Smith	2,779	58.4	−3.9
Labor	Edward Holman	1,982	41.6	+3.9
Nationalist hold		Swing	−3.9	

=== North-East Fremantle ===
1936 Western Australian state election: North-East Fremantle
Party	Candidate	Votes	%	±%
Labor	John Tonkin	2,689	52.8	−7.1
Nationalist	Eric Isaachsen	2,407	47.2	+7.1
Total formal votes		5,096	98.9	−0.3
Informal votes		56	1.1	+0.3
Turnout		5,152	76.4	−19.1
Labor hold		Swing	−7.1	

=== Northam ===
1936 Western Australian state election: Northam
Party	Candidate	Votes	%	±%
Labor	Albert Hawke	2,537	64.3	+8.9
Nationalist	Hal C.S. Colebatch	1,407	35.7	−1.1
Total formal votes		3,944	99.2	+0.4
Informal votes		30	0.8	−0.4
Turnout		3,974	85.8	−9.5
Labor hold		Swing	N/A	

=== Perth ===
1936 Western Australian state election: Perth
Party	Candidate	Votes	%	±%
Labor	Ted Needham	2,806	53.9	−4.5
Nationalist	Harry Mann	1,554	29.8	−11.8
Nationalist	William Murray	847	16.3	+16.3
Total formal votes		5,207	98.1	+0.4
Informal votes		100	1.9	−0.4
Turnout		5,307	68.3	−20.3
Labor hold		Swing	N/A	

- Preferences were not distributed.

=== Pilbara ===
1936 Western Australian state election: Pilbara
Party	Candidate	Votes	%	±%
Nationalist	Frank Welsh	358	59.4	+1.5
Labor	Donald Bennett	245	40.6	−1.5
Total formal votes		603	99.2	+2.9
Informal votes		5	0.8	−2.9
Turnout		608	83.8	−3.8
Nationalist hold		Swing	+1.5	

=== Pingelly ===
1936 Western Australian state election: Pingelly
Party	Candidate	Votes	%	±%
Country	Harrie Seward	1,743	65.7	+20.9
Country	Cecil Elsegood	909	34.3	+34.3
Total formal votes		2,652	99.4	+1.0
Informal votes		15	0.6	−1.0
Turnout		2,667	70.7	−14.7
Country hold		Swing	N/A	

=== Roebourne ===
1936 Western Australian state election: Roebourne
Party	Candidate	Votes	%	±%
Labor	Alec Rodoreda	unopposed		
Labor hold		Swing		

=== South Fremantle ===
1936 Western Australian state election: South Fremantle
Party	Candidate	Votes	%	±%
Labor	Thomas Fox	2,955	68.1	−10.4
Social Credit	David Byers	1,385	31.9	+31.9
Total formal votes		4,340	98.9	+2.1
Informal votes		49	1.1	−2.1
Turnout		4,389	60.1	−34.6
Labor hold		Swing	N/A	

=== Subiaco ===
1936 Western Australian state election: Subiaco
Party	Candidate	Votes	%	±%
Labor	John Moloney	2,320	38.5	−5.1
Nationalist	Florence Cardell-Oliver	1,442	23.9	−13.3
Nationalist	Walter Richardson	1,392	23.1	+23.1
Nationalist	Harry Downe	877	14.5	+14.5
Total formal votes		6,031	99.2	+1.6
Informal votes		47	0.8	−1.6
Turnout		6,078	80.6	−12.3
Two-party-preferred result
Nationalist	Florence Cardell-Oliver	3,364	55.8	+8.3
Labor	John Moloney	2,667	44.2	−8.3
Nationalist gain from Labor		Swing	+8.3	

=== Sussex ===
1936 Western Australian state election: Sussex
Party	Candidate	Votes	%	±%
Nationalist	Edmund Brockman	2,014	70.1	+45.0
Ind. Nationalist	Robert Falkingham	514	17.9	+2.2
Ind. Nationalist	Percy Bignell	345	12.0	+12.0
Total formal votes		2,873	98.7	+0.5
Informal votes		37	1.3	−0.5
Turnout		2,910	84.4	−10.5
Nationalist hold		Swing	N/A	

- Preferences were not distributed.

=== Swan ===
1936 Western Australian state election: Swan
Party	Candidate	Votes	%	±%
Country	Richard Sampson	unopposed		
Country hold		Swing		

=== Toodyay ===
1936 Western Australian state election: Toodyay
Party	Candidate	Votes	%	±%
Country	Lindsay Thorn	unopposed		
Country hold		Swing		

=== Victoria Park ===
1936 Western Australian state election: Victoria Park
Party	Candidate	Votes	%	±%
Labor	Howard Raphael	4,158	71.8	+2.2
Nationalist	George Mann	1,637	28.2	+8.2
Total formal votes		5,795	98.9	+1.5
Informal votes		63	1.1	−1.5
Turnout		5,858	72.8	−20.1
Labor hold		Swing	N/A	

=== Wagin ===
1936 Western Australian state election: Wagin
Party	Candidate	Votes	%	±%
Country	Sydney Stubbs	unopposed		
Country hold		Swing		

=== West Perth ===
1936 Western Australian state election: West Perth
Party	Candidate	Votes	%	±%
Nationalist	Robert McDonald	2,595	55.0	+15.7
Labor	William Beadle	2,122	45.0	−0.8
Total formal votes		4,717	99.1	+1.0
Informal votes		45	0.9	−1.0
Turnout		4,762	69.4	−21.7
Nationalist hold		Swing	+4.2	

=== Williams-Narrogin ===
1936 Western Australian state election: Williams-Narrogin
Party	Candidate	Votes	%	±%
Country	Victor Doney	unopposed		
Country hold		Swing		

=== Yilgarn-Coolgardie ===
1936 Western Australian state election: Yilgarn-Coolgardie
Party	Candidate	Votes	%	±%
Labor	George Lambert	1,199	54.0	−7.9
Independent Country	Max Dynes	1,021	46.0	+46.0
Total formal votes		2,220	98.7	+1.1
Informal votes		30	1.3	−1.1
Turnout		2,250	58.3	−29.4
Labor hold		Swing	−7.9	

=== York ===
1936 Western Australian state election: York
Party	Candidate	Votes	%	±%
Country	Charles Latham	1,485	67.3	+7.9
Independent	John Keast	720	32.7	+32.7
Total formal votes		2,205	99.2	+0.8
Informal votes		17	0.8	−0.8
Turnout		2,222	77.1	−13.5
Country hold		Swing	N/A	

== See also ==
- Candidates of the 1936 Western Australian state election
- 1936 Western Australian state election
- Members of the Western Australian Legislative Assembly, 1936–1939
