= Electoral results for the district of Nelson =

Western Australian district election results

This is a list of electoral results for the Electoral district of Nelson in Western Australian state elections.

== Members for Nelson ==
Member	Party	Term
James George Lee-Steere	Independent	1890–1897
James George Lee-Steere	Ministerial	1897–1903
John Walter	Ministerial	1903–1904
Charles Layman	Independent	1904–1905
Charles Layman	Ministerial	1905–1911
Charles Layman	Liberal	1911–1914
Francis Willmott	Country	1914–1921
John Henry Smith	Independent	1921–1922
John Henry Smith	Country	1922–1923
John Henry Smith	Country (MCP)	1923–1924
John Henry Smith	Nationalist	1924–1936
Clarence Doust	Independent	1936–1939
John Henry Smith	Nationalist	1939–1943
Ernest Hoar	Labor	1943–1950

== Election results ==
=== Elections in the 1940s ===
1947 Western Australian state election: Nelson
Party	Candidate	Votes	%	±%
Labor	Ernest Hoar	3,173	59.0	+8.8
Liberal	Edward Cummins	2,204	41.0	−8.8
Total formal votes		5,377	98.9	+0.7
Informal votes		62	1.1	−0.7
Turnout		5,439	85.9	+2.3
Labor hold		Swing	+8.8	

1943 Western Australian state election: Nelson
Party	Candidate	Votes	%	±%
Labor	Ernest Hoar	2,359	50.2	+21.0
Nationalist	John Smith	2,342	49.8	+25.3
Total formal votes		4,701	98.2	+0.6
Informal votes		87	1.8	−0.6
Turnout		4,788	83.6	−8.8
Labor gain from Nationalist		Swing	+2.6	

=== Elections in the 1930s ===
1939 Western Australian state election: Nelson
Party	Candidate	Votes	%	±%
Labor	Roy Pearce	1,527	29.2	+5.0
Nationalist	John Smith	1,278	24.5	−13.1
Independent	Clarence Doust	1,119	21.4	−16.8
Country	William Scott	822	15.7	+15.7
Ind. Nationalist	Guy Thomson	479	9.2	+9.2
Total formal votes		5,225	97.6	−1.4
Informal votes		128	2.4	+1.4
Turnout		5,353	92.4	+14.4
Two-party-preferred result
Nationalist	John Smith	2,737	52.4	+9.5
Labor	Roy Pearce	2,488	47.6	+47.6
Nationalist gain from Independent		Swing	N/A	

1936 Western Australian state election: Nelson
Party	Candidate	Votes	%	±%
Independent	Clarence Doust	1,609	38.2	+38.2
Nationalist	John Smith	1,585	37.6	−1.2
Labor	Thomas Ladhams	1,018	24.2	−13.2
Total formal votes		4,212	99.0	+1.4
Informal votes		44	1.0	−1.4
Turnout		4,256	78.0	−11.0
Two-party-preferred result
Independent	Clarence Doust	2,406	57.1	+57.1
Nationalist	John Smith	1,806	42.9	−12.8
Independent gain from Nationalist		Swing	N/A	

1933 Western Australian state election: Nelson
Party	Candidate	Votes	%	±%
Nationalist	John Smith	1,814	38.8	−27.9
Labor	Walter Toyer	1,748	37.4	+4.1
Country	William Huggett	569	12.2	+12.2
Country	Frederick Knapp	549	11.7	+11.7
Total formal votes		4,680	97.6	−1.5
Informal votes		115	2.4	+1.5
Turnout		4,795	89.0	+7.3
Two-party-preferred result
Nationalist	John Smith	2,607	55.7	−11.0
Labor	Walter Toyer	2,073	44.3	+11.0
Nationalist hold		Swing	−11.0	

1930 Western Australian state election: Nelson
Party	Candidate	Votes	%	±%
Nationalist	John Smith	2,716	66.7	
Labor	Walter Toyer	1,358	33.3	
Total formal votes		4,037	99.1	
Informal votes		37	0.9	
Turnout		4,111	81.7	
Nationalist hold		Swing		

=== Elections in the 1920s ===
1927 Western Australian state election: Nelson
Party	Candidate	Votes	%	±%
Nationalist	John Smith	2,055	50.2	−1.4
Labor	Dennis Jones	1,211	29.6	−8.9
Country	William Huggett	829	20.2	+20.2
Total formal votes		4,095	98.2	−0.4
Informal votes		75	1.8	+0.4
Turnout		4,170	74.0	+14.5
Nationalist hold		Swing	N/A	

- Preferences were not distributed.

1924 Western Australian state election: Nelson
Party	Candidate	Votes	%	±%
Country	John Smith	1,322	51.6	+16.5
Labor	Thomas Anthony	986	38.5	+14.3
Ind. Nationalist	Edwin Ellis	144	5.6	+5.6
Independent	Thomas Ladhams	112	4.4	+4.4
Total formal votes		2,564	98.6	+0.8
Informal votes		35	1.4	−0.8
Turnout		2,599	59.5	−3.6
Country gain from Independent Country		Swing	N/A	

1921 Western Australian state election: Nelson
Party	Candidate	Votes	%	±%
Country	Francis Willmott	823	40.7	−12.4
Independent Country	John Smith	709	35.1	−11.8
Labor	Thomas Ryan	488	24.2	+24.2
Total formal votes		2,020	97.8	−1.7
Informal votes		45	2.2	+1.7
Turnout		2,065	63.1	−1.6
Two-candidate-preferred result
Independent Country	John Smith	1,130	55.9	+9.0
Country	Francis Willmott	890	44.1	−9.0
Independent Country gain from Country		Swing	N/A	

=== Elections in the 1910s ===
1917 Western Australian state election: Nelson
Party	Candidate	Votes	%	±%
National Country	Francis Willmott	1,104	53.1	–1.1
Independent Labor	John Henry Smith	974	46.9	+46.9
Total formal votes		2,078	99.5	+0.1
Informal votes		10	0.5	–0.1
Turnout		2,088	64.7	–3.9
National Country hold		Swing	–1.1	

- Willmott's designation at the 1914 election was simply "Country", rather than "National Country".

1914 Western Australian state election: Nelson
Party	Candidate	Votes	%	±%
Country	Francis Willmott	1,593	54.2	+54.2
Labor	Roger Ryan	1,347	45.8	−2.2
Total formal votes		2,940	99.4	+0.1
Informal votes		19	0.6	−0.1
Turnout		2,959	68.6	−7.6
Country gain from Liberal		Swing	N/A	

1911 Western Australian state election: Nelson
Party	Candidate	Votes	%	±%
Ministerialist	Charles Layman	1,113	49.8	
Labor	William Johnston	1,073	48.0	
Ministerialist	Robert Uphill	48	2.2	
Total formal votes		2,234	99.3	
Informal votes		16	0.7	
Turnout		2,250	76.2	
Two-party-preferred result
Ministerialist	Charles Layman	1,144	51.2	
Labor	William Johnston	1,090	48.8	
Ministerialist hold		Swing		

=== Elections in the 1900s ===
1908 Western Australian state election: Nelson
Party	Candidate	Votes	%	±%
Ministerialist	Charles Layman	1,075	64.7	+7.4
Labour	William Spiers	586	35.3	+35.3
Total formal votes		1,661	97.8	−1.7
Informal votes		37	2.2	+1.7
Turnout		1,698	75.4	+3.2
Ministerialist hold		Swing	N/A	

1905 Western Australian state election: Nelson
Party	Candidate	Votes	%	±%
Ministerialist	Charles Layman	556	57.3	+10.7
Ministerialist	John Walter	414	42.7	+42.7
Total formal votes		970	99.5	+0.4
Informal votes		5	0.5	–0.4
Turnout		986	72.2	+6.7
Ministerialist hold		Swing	N/A	

1904 Western Australian state election: Nelson
Party	Candidate	Votes	%	±%
Independent	Charles Layman	558	46.6	+46.6
Labour	Joseph Barraclough	320	26.7	+26.7
Ministerialist	John Clarke	320	26.7	+26.7
Total formal votes		1,198	99.1	n/a
Informal votes		11	0.9	n/a
Turnout		1,209	65.5	n/a
Independent gain from Ministerialist		Swing	+46.6	

1903 Nelson state by-election
Party	Candidate	Votes	%	±%
Ministerialist	John Walter	unopposed		
Ministerialist hold		Swing		

1901 Western Australian state election: Nelson
Party	Candidate	Votes	%	±%
Ministerialist	Sir James Lee-Steere	unopposed		
Ministerialist hold		Swing		

=== Elections in the 1890s ===
1897 Western Australian colonial election: Nelson
Party	Candidate	Votes	%	±%
Ministerialist	James George Lee-Steere	unopposed		
Ministerialist hold		Swing		

1894 Western Australian colonial election: Nelson
Party	Candidate	Votes	%	±%
None	Sir James Lee-Steere	unopposed		

1890 Western Australian colonial election: Nelson
Party	Candidate	Votes	%	±%
None	Sir James Lee-Steere	unopposed		
