= Results of the 1943 Western Australian state election (Legislative Assembly) =

Western Australian state election, 20 November 1943 Legislative Assembly << 1939–1947 >>
Enrolled voters	212,376^{[1]}				
Votes cast	183,781		Turnout	86.54%	–5.04%
Informal votes	4,548		Informal	2.47%	+0.73%
Summary of votes by party
Party	Primary votes	%	Swing	Seats	Change
Labor	77,567	43.28%	^{[1]}	30	+ 3
Nationalist	43,529	24.29%	+0.31%	7	± 0
Country	22,251	12.41%	+0.41%	10	– 2
Ind. Nationalist	9,187	5.13%	–1.67%	1	– 1
Independent Labor	7,909	4.41%	+4.41%	0	±0
Communist	713	0.40%	+0.25%	0	± 0
Independent	10,324	5.97%	–1.68%	2	± 0
Total	179,233			50	

This is a list of electoral district results of the 1943 Western Australian election.

== Results by electoral district ==
=== Albany ===
1943 Western Australian state election: Albany
Party	Candidate	Votes	%	±%
Country	Leonard Hill	2,074	54.6	+8.5
Labor	Adrian Stacey	1,727	45.4	+2.9
Total formal votes		3,801	98.2	+0.3
Informal votes		69	1.8	−0.3
Turnout		3,870	83.6	−6.6
Country hold		Swing	−0.2	

=== Avon ===
1943 Western Australian state election: Avon
Party	Candidate	Votes	%	±%
Labor	William Telfer	1,433	50.3	+8.0
Country	Ignatius Boyle	1,418	49.7	−8.0
Total formal votes		2,851	97.8	+0.3
Informal votes		64	2.2	−0.3
Turnout		2,915	87.6	−5.9
Labor gain from Country		Swing	+8.0	

=== Beverley ===
1943 Western Australian state election: Beverley
Party	Candidate	Votes	%	±%
Country	James Mann	1,816	59.6	−40.4
Independent Labor	Frank Durack	979	32.2	+32.2
Independent Labor	John Wilkinson	250	8.2	+8.2
Total formal votes		3,045	98.5	
Informal votes		47	1.5	
Turnout		3,092	86.1	
Country hold		Swing	N/A	

- Preferences were not distributed.

=== Boulder ===
1943 Western Australian state election: Boulder
Party	Candidate	Votes	%	±%
Labor	Philip Collier	unopposed		
Labor hold		Swing		

=== Brown Hill-Ivanhoe ===
1943 Western Australian state election: Brown Hill-Ivanhoe
Party	Candidate	Votes	%	±%
Labor	Frederick Smith	unopposed		
Labor hold		Swing		

=== Bunbury ===
1943 Western Australian state election: Bunbury
Party	Candidate	Votes	%	±%
Labor	Frederick Withers	2,565	55.5	+1.6
Country	Jasper Norton	2,060	44.5	+18.3
Total formal votes		4,625	98.2	−0.2
Informal votes		86	1.8	+0.2
Turnout		4,711	85.8	−8.4
Labor hold		Swing	N/A	

=== Canning ===
1943 Western Australian state election: Canning
Party	Candidate	Votes	%	±%
Labor	Charles Cross	5,636	50.1	+5.1
Nationalist	Arthur Bishop	3,421	30.4	−3.2
Independent	Carlyle Ferguson	1,583	14.1	−7.3
Independent	William Herbert	608	5.4	+5.4
Total formal votes		11,248	96.7	−2.0
Informal votes		386	3.3	+2.0
Turnout		11,634	88.5	−4.3
Labor hold		Swing	N/A	

- Preferences were not distributed.

=== Claremont ===
1943 Western Australian state election: Claremont
Party	Candidate	Votes	%	±%
Nationalist	Eric Gillett	2,409	33.6	+33.6
Nationalist	Charles North	2,398	33.4	−66.6
Labor	John Vivian	2,372	33.0	+33.0
Total formal votes		7,179	97.5	
Informal votes		182	2.5	
Turnout		7,361	91.8	
Two-candidate-preferred result
Nationalist	Charles North	4,062	56.6	−43.4
Nationalist	Eric Gillett	3,117	43.4	+43.4
Nationalist hold		Swing	N/A	

=== Collie ===
1943 Western Australian state election: Collie
Party	Candidate	Votes	%	±%
Labor	Arthur Wilson	unopposed		
Labor hold		Swing		

=== East Perth ===
1943 Western Australian state election: East Perth
Party	Candidate	Votes	%	±%
Labor	Herb Graham	unopposed		
Labor hold		Swing		

=== Forrest ===
1943 Western Australian state election: Forrest
Party	Candidate	Votes	%	±%
Labor	Edward Holman	unopposed		
Labor hold		Swing		

=== Fremantle ===
1943 Western Australian state election: Fremantle
Party	Candidate	Votes	%	±%
Labor	Joseph Sleeman	unopposed		
Labor hold		Swing		

=== Gascoyne ===
1943 Western Australian state election: Gascoyne
Party	Candidate	Votes	%	±%
Labor	Frank Wise	unopposed		
Labor hold		Swing		

=== Geraldton ===
1943 Western Australian state election: Geraldton
Party	Candidate	Votes	%	±%
Labor	John Willcock	2,404	70.4	+15.4
Independent	John Bedwell	1,013	29.6	+29.6
Total formal votes		3,417	98.0	−1.1
Informal votes		70	2.0	+1.1
Turnout		3,487	86.8	−6.7
Labor hold		Swing	N/A	

=== Greenough ===
1943 Western Australian state election: Greenough
Party	Candidate	Votes	%	±%
Labor	John Newton	1,944	52.8	+52.8
Country	William Patrick	1,737	47.2	−52.8
Total formal votes		3,681	98.6	
Informal votes		52	1.4	
Turnout		3,733	80.9	
Labor gain from Country		Swing	N/A	

=== Guildford-Midland ===
1943 Western Australian state election: Guildford-Midland
Party	Candidate	Votes	%	±%
Labor	William Johnson	3,218	53.6	−11.3
Independent Labor	Francis Tuohy	1,834	30.5	+30.5
Ind. Nationalist	Leonard Seaton	955	13.9	+13.9
Total formal votes		6,007	97.7	−0.5
Informal votes		140	2.3	+0.5
Turnout		6,147	90.2	−3.3
Labor hold		Swing	N/A	

- Preferences were not distributed.

=== Hannans ===
1943 Western Australian state election: Hannans
Party	Candidate	Votes	%	±%
Labor	David Leahy	1,519	63.1	+1.4
Country	Jack Guise	890	36.9	+36.9
Total formal votes		2,409	97.4	−0.4
Informal votes		64	2.6	+0.4
Turnout		2,473	71.8	−22.8
Labor hold		Swing	+1.4	

=== Irwin-Moore ===
1943 Western Australian state election: Irwin-Moore
Party	Candidate	Votes	%	±%
Independent	Horace Berry	1,491	55.7	+55.7
Labor	Angus Thomson	570	21.3	+21.3
Country	Ida Swift	366	13.7	−31.3
Country	Terence Millsteed	249	9.3	+9.3
Total formal votes		2,676	98.4	−0.6
Informal votes		44	0.6	+0.6
Turnout		2,720	81.7	−6.9
Independent hold		Swing	N/A	

- Preferences were not distributed.

=== Kalgoorlie ===
1943 Western Australian state election: Kalgoorlie
Party	Candidate	Votes	%	±%
Labor	Herbert Styants	unopposed		
Labor hold		Swing		

=== Kanowna ===
1943 Western Australian state election: Kanowna
Party	Candidate	Votes	%	±%
Labor	Emil Nulsen	unopposed		
Labor hold		Swing		

=== Katanning ===
1943 Western Australian state election: Katanning
Party	Candidate	Votes	%	±%
Country	Arthur Watts	3,165	72.1	+2.6
Independent Labor	Clayton Mitchell	1,227	27.9	+27.9
Total formal votes		4,392	98.4	+0.1
Informal votes		72	1.6	−0.1
Turnout		4,464	84.9	−6.6
Country hold		Swing	N/A	

=== Kimberley ===
1943 Western Australian state election: Kimberley
Party	Candidate	Votes	%	±%
Labor	Aubrey Coverley	334	77.3	−22.7
Nationalist	Douglas Davidson	98	22.7	+22.7
Total formal votes		432	97.7	
Informal votes		10	2.3	
Turnout		442	74.9	
Labor hold		Swing	N/A	

=== Leederville ===
1943 Western Australian state election: Leederville
Party	Candidate	Votes	%	±%
Labor	Alexander Panton	5,349	63.9	+12.0
Nationalist	Charles Hammond	3,024	36.1	−1.1
Total formal votes		8,373	97.4	−0.9
Informal votes		222	2.6	+0.9
Turnout		8,595	86.7	−8.9
Labor hold		Swing	N/A	

=== Maylands ===
1943 Western Australian state election: Maylands
Party	Candidate	Votes	%	±%
Ind. Nationalist	Harry Shearn	4,342	55.0	−9.2
Labor	Roderick Hough	2,178	27.6	−8.2
Communist	Clarence Boyd	713	9.0	+9.0
Independent	John Walton	346	4.4	+4.4
Independent	Jessie Reid	314	4.0	+4.0
Total formal votes		7,893	97.0	−1.6
Informal votes		245	3.0	+1.6
Turnout		8,138	88.8	−2.9
Ind. Nationalist hold		Swing	N/A	

- Preferences were not distributed.

=== Middle Swan ===
1943 Western Australian state election: Middle Swan
Party	Candidate	Votes	%	±%
Labor	James Hegney	4,183	49.1	−2.9
Nationalist	Karl Drake-Brockman	2,326	27.3	−20.7
Independent	Henry Hawkins	2,004	23.5	+23.5
Total formal votes		8,513	97.3	−0.1
Informal votes		236	2.7	+0.1
Turnout		8,749	84.5	−4.1
Two-party-preferred result
Labor	James Hegney	4,945	58.1	+6.1
Nationalist	Karl Drake-Brockman	3,568	41.9	−6.1
Labor hold		Swing	+6.1	

=== Mount Hawthorn ===
1943 Western Australian state election: Mount Hawthorn
Party	Candidate	Votes	%	±%
Labor	Harry Millington	7,113	66.7	+8.1
Nationalist	Norman Hard	3,549	33.3	−8.1
Total formal votes		10,662	97.0	−0.9
Informal votes		327	3.0	+0.9
Turnout		10,989	88.7	−4.9
Labor hold		Swing	+8.1	

=== Mount Magnet ===
1943 Western Australian state election: Mount Magnet
Party	Candidate	Votes	%	±%
Labor	Lucien Triat	1,075	68.7	+13.7
Independent Labor	Arthur Cooper	489	31.3	+31.3
Total formal votes		1,564	97.4	+0.1
Informal votes		41	2.6	−0.1
Turnout		1,605	72.1	−9.6
Labor hold		Swing	N/A	

=== Mount Marshall ===
1943 Western Australian state election: Mount Marshall
Party	Candidate	Votes	%	±%
Labor	Stanley Hook	996	35.7	+35.7
Country	Hugh Leslie	950	34.0	−20.4
Independent	John Lindsay	845	30.3	+30.3
Total formal votes		2,791	98.0	−0.6
Informal votes		57	2.0	+0.6
Turnout		2,848	82.2	−8.1
Two-party-preferred result
Country	Hugh Leslie	1,605	57.5	+3.1
Labor	Stanley Hook	1,186	42.5	+42.5
Country hold		Swing	N/A	

=== Murchison ===
1943 Western Australian state election: Murchison
Party	Candidate	Votes	%	±%
Labor	William Marshall	unopposed		
Labor hold		Swing		

=== Murray-Wellington ===
1943 Western Australian state election: Murray-Wellington
Party	Candidate	Votes	%	±%
Nationalist	Ross McLarty	unopposed		
Nationalist hold		Swing		

=== Nedlands ===
1943 Western Australian state election: Nedlands
Party	Candidate	Votes	%	±%
Nationalist	Norbert Keenan	7,964	72.1	+24.1
Independent	Wilfred Lewis	3,084	27.9	+27.9
Total formal votes		11,048	97.4	−0.8
Informal votes		300	2.6	+0.8
Turnout		11,348	84.5	−8.3
Nationalist hold		Swing	N/A	

=== Nelson ===
1943 Western Australian state election: Nelson
Party	Candidate	Votes	%	±%
Labor	Ernest Hoar	2,359	50.2	+21.0
Nationalist	John Smith	2,342	49.8	+25.3
Total formal votes		4,701	98.2	+0.6
Informal votes		87	1.8	−0.6
Turnout		4,788	83.6	−8.8
Labor gain from Nationalist		Swing	+2.6	

=== North-East Fremantle ===
1943 Western Australian state election: North-East Fremantle
Party	Candidate	Votes	%	±%
Labor	John Tonkin	unopposed		
Labor hold		Swing		

=== North Perth ===
1943 Western Australian state election: North Perth
Party	Candidate	Votes	%	±%
Labor	Gavan McMullan	2,500	42.5	+9.8
Nationalist	Arthur Abbott	2,376	40.4	−3.0
Ind. Nationalist	Agnes Robertson	1,003	17.1	+17.1
Total formal votes		5,879	96.9	−1.7
Informal votes		187	3.1	+1.7
Turnout		6,066	95.2	+4.1
Two-party-preferred result
Nationalist	Arthur Abbott	3,171	53.9	−8.7
Labor	Gavan McMullan	2,708	46.1	+8.7
Nationalist hold		Swing	−8.7	

=== Northam ===
1943 Western Australian state election: Northam
Party	Candidate	Votes	%	±%
Labor	Albert Hawke	2,828	69.9	+7.1
Country	Hurtle Prater	1,217	30.1	+30.1
Total formal votes		4,045	98.4	−0.4
Informal votes		64	1.6	+0.4
Turnout		4,109	85.4	−8.2
Labor hold		Swing	+7.1	

=== Perth ===
1943 Western Australian state election: Perth
Party	Candidate	Votes	%	±%
Labor	Ted Needham	4,066	59.4	+10.2
Nationalist	William Murray	1,477	21.6	−8.4
Ind. Nationalist	Walter Maddeford	1,304	19.0	+19.0
Total formal votes		6,847	96.4	−1.8
Informal votes		258	3.6	+1.8
Turnout		7,105	86.7	+3.0
Labor hold		Swing	N/A	

- Preferences were not distributed.

=== Pilbara ===
1943 Western Australian state election: Pilbara
Party	Candidate	Votes	%	±%
Labor	Bill Hegney	401	64.7	+12.1
Country	Peter Cassey	173	27.9	+27.9
Independent Labor	Don McLeod	46	7.4	+7.4
Total formal votes		620	96.7	−2.4
Informal votes		21	3.3	+2.4
Turnout		641	78.9	−6.9
Labor hold		Swing	N/A	

- Preferences were not distributed.

=== Pingelly ===
1943 Western Australian state election: Pingelly
Party	Candidate	Votes	%	±%
Country	Harrie Seward	1,970	67.8	−32.2
Independent	Percy Munday	935	32.2	+32.2
Total formal votes		2,905	98.7	
Informal votes		39	1.3	
Turnout		2,944	80.2	
Country hold		Swing	N/A	

=== Roebourne ===
1943 Western Australian state election: Roebourne
Party	Candidate	Votes	%	±%
Labor	Alec Rodoreda	221	69.5	+7.4
Country	George Monger	97	30.5	+30.5
Total formal votes		318	98.8	−0.8
Informal votes		4	1.2	+0.8
Turnout		322	65.5	−19.3
Labor hold		Swing	+7.4	

=== South Fremantle ===
1943 Western Australian state election: South Fremantle
Party	Candidate	Votes	%	±%
Labor	Tom Fox	unopposed		
Labor hold		Swing		

=== Subiaco ===
1943 Western Australian state election: Subiaco
Party	Candidate	Votes	%	±%
Nationalist	Florence Cardell-Oliver	4,132	58.7	+18.5
Labor	William Lonnie	2,909	41.3	+4.4
Total formal votes		7,041	97.5	−1.5
Informal votes		183	2.5	+1.5
Turnout		7,224	93.8	−1.3
Nationalist hold		Swing	+0.7	

=== Sussex ===
1943 Western Australian state election: Sussex
Party	Candidate	Votes	%	±%
Nationalist	William Willmott	2,060	62.3	+20.7
Labor	Albert Morgan	1,248	37.7	+9.2
Total formal votes		3,308	97.9	−0.7
Informal votes		70	2.1	+0.7
Turnout		3,378	87.3	−8.3
Nationalist hold		Swing	−0.4	

=== Swan ===
1943 Western Australian state election: Swan
Party	Candidate	Votes	%	±%
Country	Richard Sampson	3,583	62.7	+16.8
Labor	Owen Hanlon	2,128	37.3	+5.8
Total formal votes		5,711	96.4	−1.5
Informal votes		215	3.6	+1.5
Turnout		5,926	93.0	+3.4
Country hold		Swing	+0.7	

=== Toodyay ===
1943 Western Australian state election: Toodyay
Party	Candidate	Votes	%	±%
Country	Lindsay Thorn	2,290	67.0	−33.0
Labor	Dominic Johnston	1,127	33.0	+33.0
Total formal votes		3,417	98.6	
Informal votes		49	1.4	
Turnout		3,466	80.6	
Country hold		Swing	N/A	

=== Victoria Park ===
1943 Western Australian state election: Victoria Park
Party	Candidate	Votes	%	±%
Labor	Howard Raphael	5,446	66.2	−1.8
Nationalist	Albert Hansen	2,785	33.8	+1.8
Total formal votes		8,231	97.4	−1.1
Informal votes		218	2.6	+1.1
Turnout		8,449	91.3	−2.3
Labor hold		Swing	−1.8	

=== Wagin ===
1943 Western Australian state election: Wagin
Party	Candidate	Votes	%	±%
Country	Sydney Stubbs	1,435	42.7	−23.9
Labor	Patrick Moore	822	24.5	+24.5
Country	Gerald Piesse	750	22.3	+22.3
Country	Alistair Wills-Johnson	353	10.5	+10.5
Total formal votes		3,360	98.0	−0.6
Informal votes		67	2.0	+0.6
Turnout		3,427	86.9	−4.1
Two-party-preferred result
Country	Sydney Stubbs	2,286	68.0	
Labor	Patrick Moore	1,074	32.0	
Country hold		Swing	N/A	

=== West Perth ===
1943 Western Australian state election: West Perth
Party	Candidate	Votes	%	±%
Nationalist	Robert McDonald	3,168	53.8	−9.0
Labor	William Beadle	2,723	46.2	+9.0
Total formal votes		5,891	97.7	−0.2
Informal votes		139	2.3	+0.2
Turnout		6,030	84.0	−5.4
Nationalist hold		Swing	−9.0	

=== Williams-Narrogin ===
1943 Western Australian state election: Williams-Narrogin
Party	Candidate	Votes	%	±%
Country	Victor Doney	1,749	66.6	−3.6
Labor	Edward Dolan	877	33.4	+3.6
Total formal votes		2,626	98.6	−0.5
Informal votes		37	1.4	+0.5
Turnout		2,663	84.8	−4.7
Country hold		Swing	−3.6	

=== Yilgarn-Coolgardie ===
1943 Western Australian state election: Yilgarn-Coolgardie
Party	Candidate	Votes	%	±%
Independent	Lionel Kelly	1,269	59.9	+20.5
Labor	Francis Bennett	849	40.1	+5.1
Total formal votes		2,118	97.2	−1.0
Informal votes		60	2.8	+1.0
Turnout		2,178	81.5	+13.6
Independent hold		Swing	+6.3	

=== York ===
1943 Western Australian state election: York
Party	Candidate	Votes	%	±%
Country	Charles Perkins	855	34.6	−26.9
Labor	Douglas McRae	676	27.4	+27.4
Independent	John Keast	515	20.9	−17.6
Country	Albert Noonan	422	17.1	+17.1
Total formal votes		2,468	98.8	−0.6
Informal votes		31	1.2	+0.6
Turnout		2,499	91.2	−0.8
Two-party-preferred result
Country	Charles Perkins	1,437	58.2	−3.3
Labor	Douglas McRae	1,031	41.8	+3.3
Country hold		Swing	−3.3	

== See also ==
- Candidates of the 1943 Western Australian state election
- 1943 Western Australian state election
- Members of the Western Australian Legislative Assembly, 1943–1947
