= Candidates of the 1936 Western Australian state election =

The 1936 Western Australian state election was held on 15 February 1936.

== Retiring Members ==
- No sitting MP's retired at this election.

== Legislative Assembly ==
Sitting members are shown in bold text. Successful candidates are highlighted in the relevant colour. Where there is possible confusion, an asterisk (*) is also used.

| Electorate | Held by | Labor candidate | Nationalist candidate | Country candidate | Other candidates |
|---|---|---|---|---|---|
| Albany | Labor | **Arthur Wansbrough** | | Leonard Hill | Charles Bolt (Ind.) |
| Avon | Country | | | **Ignatius Boyle***; Hugh Harling | |
| Beverley | Country | | | **James Mann***; Thomas Retalic; George Weaver | John O'Dea (Ind. Country) |
| Boulder | Labor | **Philip Collier** | | | |
| Brown Hill-Ivanhoe | Labor | **Frederick Smith** | | | |
| Bunbury | Labor | **Frederick Withers** | Cuthbert Butler | | |
| Canning | Labor | **Charles Cross** | Herbert Wells; Thomas Willsmore | | Carlyle Ferguson (Ind.); Oliver Strang (Ind. Nationalist) |
| Claremont | Nationalist | | **Charles North***; Donald Cleland | | |
| Collie | Labor | **Arthur Wilson** | | | |
| East Perth | Labor | **James Kenneally** | | | Thomas Hughes* (Ind. Labor); Felix Hughes (Ind.); Wilfred Mountjoy (Communist) |
| Forrest | Labor | **May Holman** | | | |
| Fremantle | Labor | **Joseph Sleeman** | Aidan Bryan | | |
| Gascoyne | Labor | **Frank Wise** | | Jack Pericles | |
| Geraldton | Labor | **John Willcock** | | Alfred Culewis | |
| Greenough | Country | | | **William Patrick** | John Garland (Ind. Labor); Henry Carson (Ind.) |
| Guildford-Midland | Labor | **William Johnson** | | | |
| Hannans | Labor | **Selby Munsie** | | | |
| Irwin-Moore | Country | | | **Percy Ferguson** | Cyril Rodoreda (Ind.) |
| Kalgoorlie | Labor | Herbert Styants*; **James Cunningham**; Robert Elliott | | | |
| Kanowna | Labor | **Emil Nulsen** | | | |
| Katanning | Country | | | **Arthur Watts** | Nelson Lemmon (Ind. Country) |
| Kimberley | Labor | **Aubrey Coverley** | | Ronald Herrin | |
| Leederville | Labor | **Alexander Panton** | Charles Veryard | | |
| Maylands | Labor | **Robert Clothier** | Tom Hartrey; Arthur Daley | | Harry Shearn (Ind. Nationalist) |
| Middle Swan | Labor | **James Hegney** | David Pyvis | | |
| Mount Hawthorn | Labor | **Harry Millington** | Arthur Abbott | | |
| Mount Magnet | Labor | **Michael Troy** | | | |
| Mount Marshall | Country | | | **Frederick Warner***; Joseph Diver | |
| Murchison | Labor | **William Marshall** | | | |
| Murray-Wellington | Nationalist | | **Ross McLarty** | | |
| Nedlands | Nationalist | Dorothy Tangney | **Norbert Keenan** | | |
| Nelson | Nationalist | Thomas Ladhams | **John Smith** | | Clarence Doust (Ind.) |
| North Perth | Nationalist | Edward Holman | **James Smith***; Reginald Miller; Karl Drake-Brockman | | |
| North-East Fremantle | Labor | **John Tonkin** | Eric Isaachsen | | |
| Northam | Labor | **Albert Hawke** | Hal C.S. Colebatch | | |
| Perth | Labor | **Ted Needham** | Harry Mann; William Murray | | |
| Pilbara | Nationalist | Donald Bennett | **Frank Welsh** | | |
| Pingelly | Country | | | **Harrie Seward***; Cecil Eslegood | |
| Roebourne | Labor | **Alec Rodoreda** | | | |
| South Fremantle | Labor | **Tom Fox** | | | David Byers (Social Credit) |
| Subiaco | Labor | **John Moloney** | Florence Cardell-Oliver*; Walter Richardson; Harry Downe | | |
| Sussex | Nationalist | | **Edmund Brockman** | | Robert Falkingham (Ind. Nationalist); Percy Bignell (Ind. Nationalist) |
| Swan | Country | | | **Richard Sampson** | |
| Toodyay | Country | | | **Lindsay Thorn** | |
| Victoria Park | Labor | **Howard Raphael** | George Mann | | |
| Wagin | Country | | | **Sydney Stubbs** | |
| West Perth | Nationalist | William Beadle | **Robert McDonald** | | |
| Williams-Narrogin | Country | Harry Hyde | | **Victor Doney** | |
| Yilgarn-Coolgardie | Labor | **George Lambert** | | | Max Dynes (Ind. Country) |
| York | Country | | | **Charles Latham** | John Keast (Ind.) |

== See also ==
- Members of the Western Australian Legislative Assembly, 1933–1936
- Members of the Western Australian Legislative Assembly, 1936–1939
- 1936 Western Australian state election
