= Candidates of the 1943 Western Australian state election =

The 1943 Western Australian state election was held on 20 November 1943.

== Retiring Members ==
=== Country ===
- Frederick Warner (MLA) Mount Marshall

== Legislative Assembly ==
Sitting members are shown in bold text. Successful candidates are highlighted in the relevant colour. Where there is possible confusion, an asterisk (*) is also used.

Electorate	Held by	Labor candidate	Nationalist candidate	Country candidate	Other candidates
Albany	Country	Adrian Stacey		**Leonard Hill**	
Avon	Country	William Telfer		**Ignatius Boyle**	
Beverley	Country			**James Mann**	Frank Durack (Ind. Labor); John Wilkinson (Ind. Labor)
Boulder	Labor	**Philip Collier**			
Brown Hill-Ivanhoe	Labor	**Frederick Smith**			
Bunbury	Labor	**Frederick Withers**		Jasper Norton	
Canning	Labor	**Charles Cross**	Arthur Bishop		Carlyle Ferguson (Ind.); William Herbert (Ind.)
Claremont	Nationalist	John Vivian	**Charles North***; Eric Gillett		
Collie	Labor	**Arthur Wilson**			
East Perth	Labor	**Herb Graham**			
Forrest	Labor	**Edward Holman**			
Fremantle	Labor	**Joseph Sleeman**			
Gascoyne	Labor	**Frank Wise**			
Geraldton	Labor	**John Willcock**			John Bedwell (Ind.)
Greenough	Country	John Newton		**William Patrick**	
Guildford-Midland	Labor	**William Johnson**			Francis Tuohy (Ind. Labor); Leonard Seaton (Ind. Nationalist)
Hannans	Labor	**David Leahy**		Jack Guise	
Irwin-Moore	Independent	Angus Thomson		Ida Swift; Terence Millsteed	**Horace Berry** (Ind.)
Kalgoorlie	Labor	**Herbert Styants**			
Kanowna	Labor	**Emil Nulsen**			
Katanning	Country	Clayton Mitchell		**Arthur Watts**	
Kimberley	Labor	**Aubrey Coverley**	Douglas Davidson		
Leederville	Labor	**Alexander Panton**	Charles Hammond		
Maylands	Ind. Nationalist	Roderick Hough			**Harry Shearn*** (Ind. Nationalist); Clarence Boyd (Communist); John Walton (Ind.); Jessie Reid (Ind.)
Middle Swan	Labor	**James Hegney**	Karl Drake-Brockman		Henry Hawkins (Ind.)
Mount Hawthorn	Labor	**Harry Millington**	Norman Hard		
Mount Magnet	Labor	**Lucien Triat**			Arthur Cooper (Ind. Labor)
Mount Marshall	Country	Stanley Hook		Hugh Leslie	John Lindsay (Ind.)
Murchison	Labor	**William Marshall**			
Murray-Wellington	Nationalist		**Ross McLarty**		
Nedlands	Nationalist		**Norbert Keenan**		Wilfred Lewis (Ind.)
Nelson	Nationalist	Ernest Hoar	**John Smith**		
North-East Fremantle	Labor	**John Tonkin**			
North Perth	Nationalist	Gavan McMullan	**Arthur Abbott**		Agnes Robertson (Ind. Nationalist)
Northam	Labor	**Albert Hawke**		Hurtle Prater	
Perth	Labor	**Ted Needham**	William Murray		Walter Maddeford (Ind. Nationalist)
Pilbara	Labor	**Bill Hegney**		Peter Cassey	Donald McLeod (Prog. Labor)
Pingelly	Country			**Harrie Seward**	Percy Munday (Ind.)
Roebourne	Labor	**Alec Rodoreda**		George Monger	
South Fremantle	Labor	**Tom Fox**			
Subiaco	Nationalist	William Lonnie	**Florence Cardell-Oliver**		
Sussex	Nationalist	Albert Morgan	**William Willmott**		
Swan	Country	Owen Hanlon		**Richard Sampson**	
Toodyay	Country	Dominic Johnston		**Lindsay Thorn**	
Victoria Park	Labor	**Howard Raphael**	Albert Hansen		
Wagin	Country	Patrick Moore		**Sydney Stubbs***; Gerald Piesse; Alistair Wills-Johnson	
West Perth	Nationalist	William Beadle	**Robert McDonald**		
Williams-Narrogin	Country	Edward Dolan		**Victor Doney**	
Yilgarn-Coolgardie	Independent	Francis Bennett			**Lionel Kelly** (Ind.)
York	Country	Douglas McRae		**Charles Perkins***; Albert Noonan	John Keast (Ind.)

== See also ==
- Members of the Western Australian Legislative Assembly, 1939–1943
- Members of the Western Australian Legislative Assembly, 1943–1947
- 1943 Western Australian state election
