= John Hardwick =

John Hardwick may refer to:

- John Hardwick (director) (born 1965), British television and film director
- John Hardwick (politician) (1867–1943), Australian politician
- Johnny Hardwick (1958-2023), American comedian and voice actor
