= 1904 East Perth state by-election =

- 20 September 1904
- Turnout: 2,286
Candidate	John Hardwick	John Curran
Party	Ministerialist	Labor
Popular vote	1,251	1,013
Percentage	55.3	44.7
MP before election
Walter James
Ministerialist
Elected MP
John Hardwick
Ministerialist

A by-election for the Western Australian Legislative Assembly seat of East Perth was held on 20 October 1904. It was triggered by the resignation of former Ministerialist Premier Walter James, who was appointed to take up the role of Agent General for Western Australia. The election was won by Ministerialist candidate John Hardwick, who beat the Labor Party's John Curran.

== Background ==
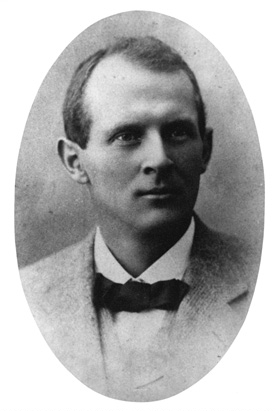
Walter James, the member for East Perth from 1894 to 1904 and the premier of Western Australia from 1902 to 1904

Walter James had been the member for East Perth in the Western Australian Legislative Assembly since 1894, and served as the premier and attorney-general as part of the Ministerialists from July 1902.

=== Previous election results ===
1904 Western Australian state election: East Perth
Party	Candidate	Votes	%	±%
Ministerialist	Walter James	1,396	52.7	–10.0
Labour	Edward Casson	1,253	47.3	+47.3
Total formal votes		2,649	98.4	–0.7
Informal votes		42	1.6	+0.7
Turnout		2,695	38.7	–0.9
Ministerialist hold		Swing	–10.0	

=== Resignation of Walter James ===
In August 1904, two months after the 1904 state election, the James Government was defeated in a motion of no confidence. He was replaced as premier by Henry Daglish of the Labor Party. The following month, Daglish offered James the role of Agent General for Western Australia representing the state in London. It was unanimously agreed that James was suited for the position, but some were sceptical of Daglish's motives, believing that he was trying to get his main political rival out of parliament and was possibly trying to have the Labor Party win the ensuing by-election. The move also saw disillusion grow within the Labor Party's rank-and-file, as one of their main attacks on James during his premiership was that he gave cabinet positions out as bribes to gain support, similar to what Daglish was doing now.

On 30 September, James formally resigned. On 4 October, the Legislative Assembly passed a motion that the seat be declared vacant, and so the speaker issued a writ for the election. 12 October was set at the due date for nominations, Thursday, 20 October was set as the day of the election, and 24 October for the return of the writ.

== Candidates ==
=== Ministerialist ===
John Hardwick, a Perth City councillor and James's campaign manager for the 1904 election, was selected by the East Perth Electoral league and endorsed by the National Political league.

=== Labor ===
Edward Casson, who was Labor's candidate for East Perth at the 1904 state election, declined requests for him to be Labor's candidate, saying that "in view of the existing circumstances in regard to the political situation, I cannot see my way clear to do so". This was in reference to the Daglish Ministry abandoning several Labor principles that they were elected on. Other potential Labor candidates were:

- J. J. Curran, secretary of the Coastal Trades and Labour Council
- J. Fabre, secretary of the Hotel, Restaurant, and Caterers' Employees' Union
- Con O'Brien, member of the Legislative Council from 1901 to 1904
- H. Courtney, president of the East Perth branch of the Political Labor Party
- J. Healy, unsuccessful candidate for the seat of Canning at the 1904 state election
- W. Eales
- W. Somerville

Curran was viewed as the most likely candidate to be selected, as he had lived in East Perth ever since he moved to Western Australia. Nominations closed at 6pm on 26 September, with Curran, Fabre, O'Brien, Courtney, and Healy as the nominations. On 30 September, each nomination gave a speech, after which East Perth branch members voted. The winning candidate had to receive an absolute majority. In the first ballot, Curran was three short of a majority, and so O'Brien and Healy dropped out. Curran was two short of a majority after the second ballot, and Fabre and Courtney were tied, so the chairman gave his casting vote to Fabre. In the final ballot, Curran received a majority of the votes, and so he was selected as Labor's candidate for the by-election.

== Campaign ==
Hardwick primarily campaigned on local issues, however, members of the former James Ministry, such as Hector Rason, John Marquis Hopkins and Henry Gregory, campaigned on issues affecting the state.

== Results ==
1904 East Perth state by-election
Party	Candidate	Votes	%	±%
Ministerialist	John Hardwick	1,251	55.3	N/A
Labor	John Curran	1,013	44.7	−2.6
Total formal votes		2,264	99.0	+0.6
Informal votes		21	1.0	−0.6
Turnout		2,285	32.8	−5.9
Ministerialist gain from Ministerialist		Swing	N/A	

The by-election had four polling places.

== See also ==
- Electoral results for the district of East Perth
- List of Western Australian state by-elections
