= 1936 Western Australian state election =

- 15 February 1936

All 50 seats in the Western Australian Legislative Assembly
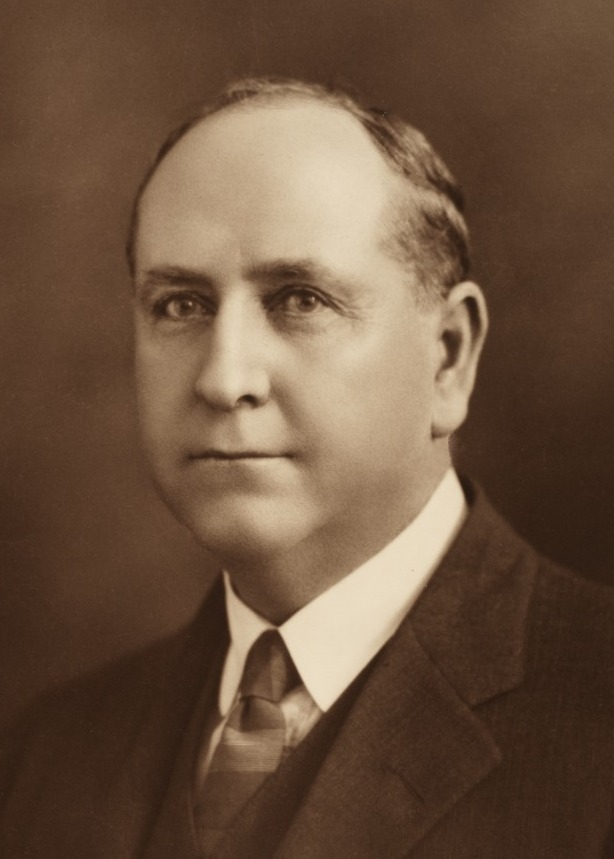

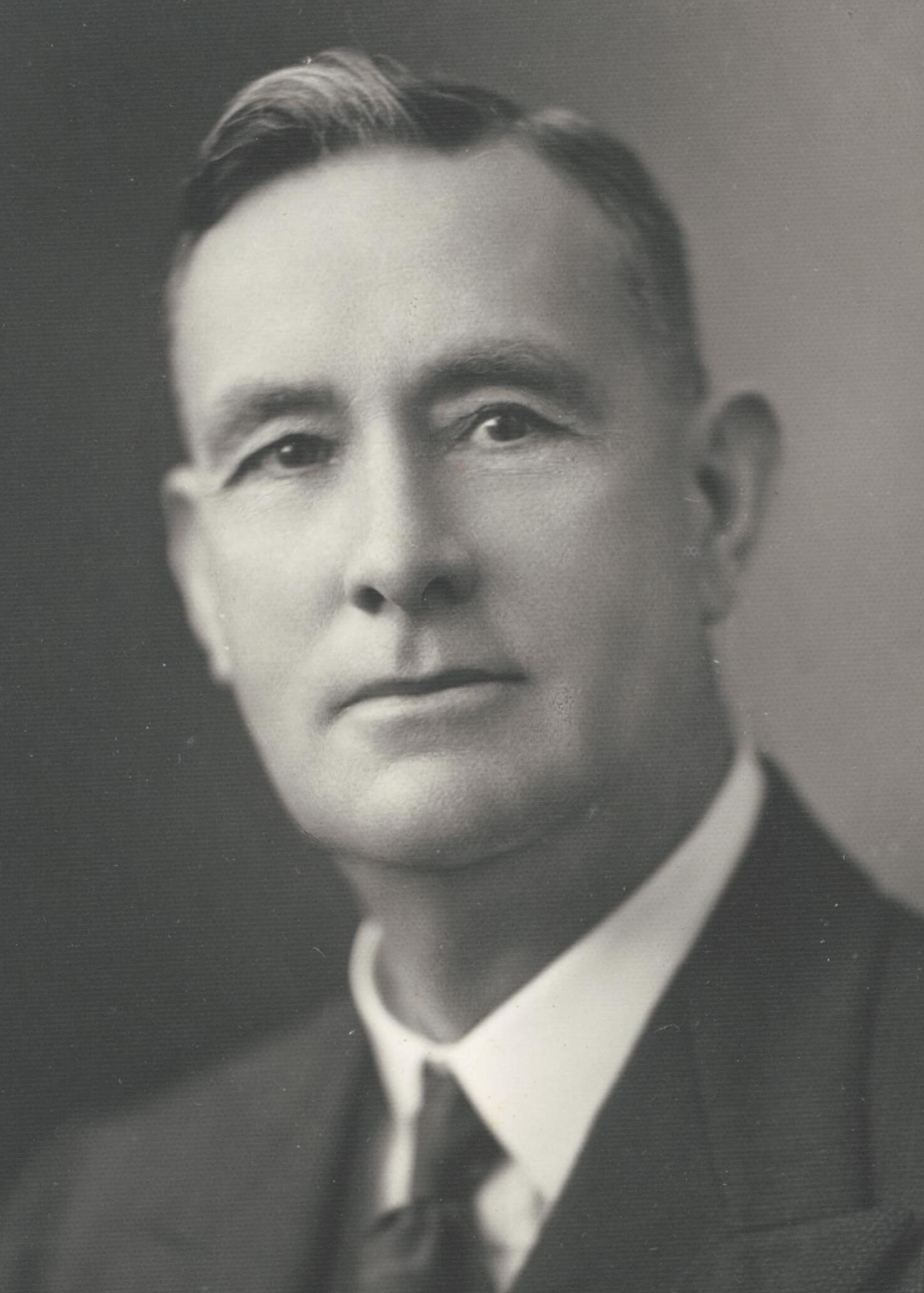

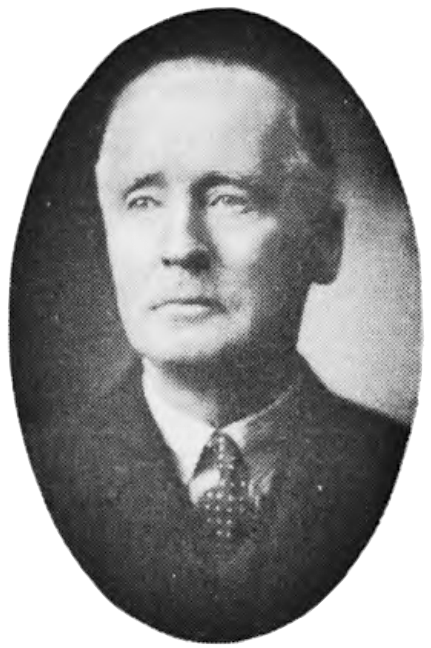
	First party	Second party	Third party
Leader	Philip Collier	Charles Latham	Norbert Keenan
Party	Labor	Country	Nationalist
Leader since	16 April 1917	12 April 1930	24 April 1933
Leader's seat	Boulder	York	Nedlands
Last election	30 seats	12 seats	8 seats
Seats won	26 seats	13 seats	8 seats
Seat change	▼4	▲1	0
Percentage	42.33%	14.60%	32.36%
Swing	▼3.15	▲0.32	▲1.83
Premier before election
Philip Collier
Labor
Elected Premier
Philip Collier
Labor

Elections were held in the state of Western Australia on 15 February 1936 to elect all 50 members to the Legislative Assembly. The Labor Party, led by Premier Philip Collier, won a second term in office against the Country and Nationalist parties, led by Opposition Leader Charles Latham and Norbert Keenan respectively.

No sitting MLA's retired at this election. This was one of the few elections in which the Labor party allowed more than one candidate to run against a sitting MP, namely in the seat of Kalgoorlie. James Cunningham was defeated by fellow Labor candidate Herbert Styants, and Cunningham transferred to the Australian Senate the following year.

== Results ==
At the election, 5 sitting members (four Labor and one Nationalist) were defeated—three of them by independents. In Maylands, one-term MLA Robert Clothier (Labor) was defeated by independent Nationalist Harry Shearn, who won with preferences from two endorsed nationalists. In East Perth, Minister for Employment and Labour James Kenneally was defeated by former Labor member Thomas Hughes, and the Nationalist member for Nelson, John Henry Smith, was defeated by independent Clarence Doust. The remaining seats, Subiaco and Albany, were lost by Labor to the Nationalist and Country parties respectively.

Western Australian state election, 15 February 1936 Legislative Assembly << 1933–1939 >>
Enrolled voters	194,354^{[1]}				
Votes cast	136,309		Turnout	70.13%	–20.47%
Informal votes	1,518		Informal	1.11%	–1.12%
Summary of votes by party
Party	Primary votes	%	Swing	Seats	Change
Labor	57,055	42.33%	–3.15%	26	– 4
Nationalist	43,619	32.36%	+1.83%	8	± 0
Country	19,685	14.60%	+0.32%	13	+ 1
Ind. Nat.	3,418	2.54%	+1.33%	1	+ 1
Social Credit	1,385	1.03%	+1.03%	0	± 0
Communist	118	0.09%	–0.16%	0	± 0
Independent	9,431	7.00%	–1.21%	2	+ 2
Total	134,791			50	

^{1} 247,465 electors were enrolled to vote at the election, but 15 of the 50 seats were uncontested—10 Labor seats representing 33,038 enrolled voters, 1 Nationalist seat representing 3,933 voters and 4 Country seats representing 16,284 voters.

== See also ==
- Candidates of the 1936 Western Australian state election
- Members of the Western Australian Legislative Assembly, 1933–1936
- Members of the Western Australian Legislative Assembly, 1936–1939
- Second Collier Ministry
