= The Mirror (Western Australia) =

Former newspaper in Western Australia

- Type: newspaper
- Format: weekly
- Owners: Victor Desmond Courtney; John Joseph Simons
- Founded: 1920
- Headquarters: Murray Street, Perth
- Sister newspapers: The Call

The Mirror was a weekly broadsheet newspaper published from 1921 until 1956. It was the "scandal sheet" of its day, dealing with divorce cases and scandals.

== History ==
In 1918, Victor Desmond Courtney in partnership with John Joseph Simons, became managing editor of a weekly sporting newspaper, The Sportsman, which covered racing, trotting, minor sports and theatricals. They expanded the scope of The Sportsman, to cover general local news and renamed it The Call. The paper gained publicity from a libel suit brought by William Lathlain, the Lord Mayor of Perth. They then bought a struggling Saturday-evening paper, The Sunday Mirror, for £A 100, equivalent to A$10,120 in 2022, from Bryan's Print, renaming it The Mirror, and building its circulation during the 1920s to over 10,000, largely through racy reporting of scandals and divorces. "It was not a good paper" Courtney later admitted, "but it was a paper with the news and it was the news dished out in a breezy fashion while the entertainment angle of news presentation was kept well in mind". "It titillated Perth males in a constrained way and, unlike Truth, it was a 'clean dirty paper'." The Mirror featured sport and sensation, finding scandalous headlines, such as "Nakedness at North Beach" together with pious editorials. The first edition of The Sunday Mirror was issued on 27 June 1920 for the price of two pence, equivalent to A$0.79 in 2022, and ran for 42 issues until 10 April 1921.

The Mirror was helped through the Great Depression by Money Words, a popular competition.

Courtney was the editor at the paper until 1935, when Frank Davidson was appointed editor.

In 1935, a syndicate led by Simons and including Courtney and mining entrepreneur Claude de Bernales purchased Western Press Limited, the publishers of The Sunday Times, for £A 55,000, equivalent to A$6.02 million in 2022. Simons remained the managing director of Western Press until his death in 1948.

In 1955, Courtney sold Western Press to Rupert Murdoch's News Limited, which closed the paper the following year. Gregory & Gothard describe the purchase as "a first tiny step on the way to (Murdoch) becoming a media czar".
