= M. F. A. Canning =

Australian politician

Member of the Legislative Assembly of Western Australia
- In office 19 December 1890 – 15 June 1894
- Preceded by: None (new creation)
- Succeeded by: Walter James
- Constituency: East Perth

Personal details
- Born: 22 September 1829 Paris, France
- Died: 13 November 1911 (aged 82) Perth, Western Australia, Australia

Marinus Francis Alfred Canning (Note: Canning's middle name is given as "Frederick" in some sources.) (22 September 1829 – 13 November 1911), generally known as Alfred Canning, was an Australian banker and politician who served in the Legislative Assembly of Western Australia from 1890 to 1894, representing the seat of East Perth.

Canning was born in Paris, France, to Emma (née Nowell) and Francis Canning. His father, a British Army officer and member of the landed gentry, was originally from Warwickshire, where the family's seat was Foxcote House. Canning was educated privately in England and also attended the Lycée Charlemagne in France, and was said to have "a thorough knowledge of several European languages". He is believed to have arrived in Australia in 1855, initially living in Queensland. He later went to New South Wales, working as a storekeeper, and in Tenterfield in 1856 married Elizabeth Annie Morgan, with whom he would have eight children. In the 1870s, Canning moved to Tahiti, where he managed a bank. He returned to Australia in 1875, joining the Bank of New South Wales, and was subsequently posted to New Caledonia and Tasmania.

In 1883, Canning was posted to Western Australia to open a branch of the Bank of New South Wales in Perth. He left the bank the following year, however, instead opening a mortgage agency. Canning was elected to parliament at the 1890 general election (the first to be held for the Legislative Assembly), winning the seat of East Perth. He was appointed chairman of committees in 1892, but was defeated by Walter James (a future premier) at the 1894 election. Just over a month after his defeat, Canning stood for the Legislative Council's Metropolitan Province, but was again unsuccessful. At the 1897 general election, he ran for the seat of Canning, (Note: The seat of Canning was named for the Canning River, which was in turn named for George Canning, a Prime Minister of the United Kingdom.) but was defeated by Frank Wilson (another future premier). Canning died in Perth in 1911, aged 82. One of his great-grandchildren was Bill Hassell, who was also a member of parliament.

== Notes ==
Parliament of Western Australia
New creation	Member for East Perth; 1890–1894	Succeeded by Walter James
