= 1943 Western Australian state election =

- 20 November 1943

All 50 seats in the Western Australian Legislative Assembly 26 Assembly seats were needed for a majority
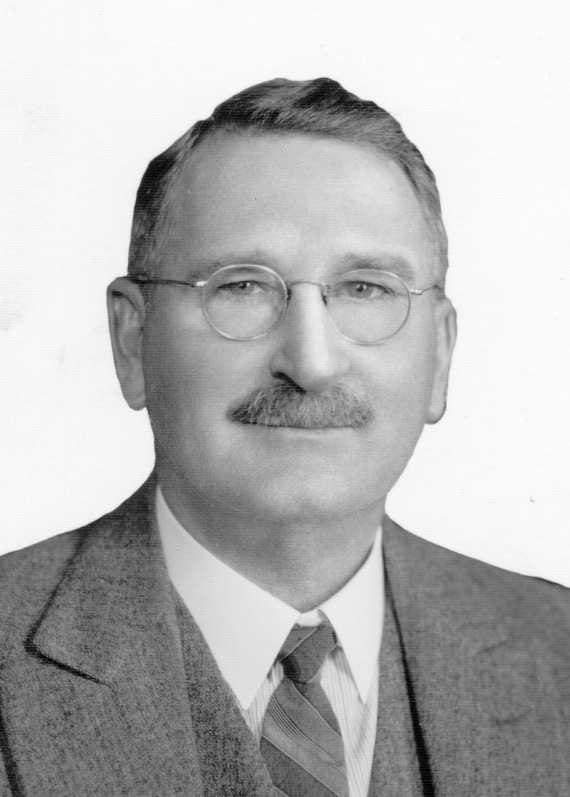

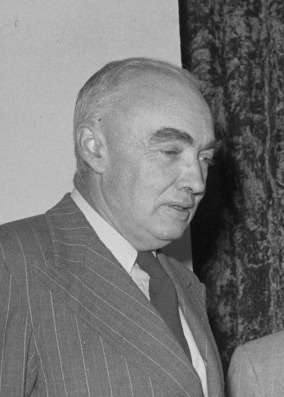
	First party	Second party	Third party
Leader	John Willcock	Arthur Watts	Ross McDonald
Party	Labor	Country	Nationalist
Leader since	20 August 1936	8 October 1942	13 April 1938
Leader's seat	Geraldton	Katanning	West Perth
Last election	27 seats	12 seats	7 seats
Seats won	30 seats	10 seats	7 seats
Seat change	▲3	▼2	0
Percentage	43.28%	12.41%	24.29%
Swing	▲4.00? (see Results)	▲0.41	▲0.31
Premier before election
John Willcock
Labor
Elected Premier
John Willcock
Labor

Elections were held in the state of Western Australia on 20 November 1943 to elect all 50 members to the Legislative Assembly. The Labor Party, led by Premier John Willcock, won a fourth term in office against the Country and Nationalist parties, led by Opposition Leader Arthur Watts and Robert Ross McDonald respectively.

The election took place in the midst of World War II, and as such, turnout was considerably down on the previous election. The election was delayed from its intended date of February 1942 by the Legislative Assembly Duration and General Election Postponement Acts (No 51 of 1941, assented 16 January 1942, and No 18 of 1942, assented 9 December 1942) due to the war.

In the previous term, two changes of membership occurred at by-elections. George Lambert, the Labor member for Yilgarn-Coolgardie, died on 30 June 1941 and was replaced by former Labor branch secretary Lionel Kelly, running under the "Independent Country" banner. He ultimately joined the Labor Party and became a minister in the Bert Hawke government in the 1950s. In 1943, long-serving and colourful independent Thomas Hughes resigned his seat of East Perth to contest the federal seat of Perth. It was picked up by Labor's Herb Graham. Prior to the election, former Independent Nationalist Arthur Abbott joined the Nationalist Party.

== Results ==
Apart from Labor gaining two seats from the Country Party (Avon and Greenough) and one from the Nationalists (Nelson, where Ernest Hoar defeated the incumbent member by just 17 votes), no changes took place at the election. An interesting race in Mount Marshall opened up by the retirement of incumbent Country member Frederick Warner ended with the Country candidate, Hugh Leslie, victorious against the ALP and former minister John Lindsay.

Western Australian state election, 20 November 1943 Legislative Assembly << 1939–1947 >>
Enrolled voters	212,376^{[1]}				
Votes cast	183,781		Turnout	86.54%	–5.04%
Informal votes	4,548		Informal	2.47%	+0.73%
Summary of votes by party
Party	Primary votes	%	Swing	Seats	Change
Labor	77,567	43.28%	^{[1]}	30	+ 3
Nationalist	43,529	24.29%	+0.31%	7	± 0
Country	22,251	12.41%	+0.41%	10	– 2
Ind. Nationalist^{[2]}	9,187	5.13%	–1.67%	1	– 1
Independent Labor WA	7,909	4.41%	+4.41%	0	±0
Communist	713	0.40%	+0.25%	0	± 0
Independent	10,324	5.97%	–1.68%	2	± 0
Total	179,233			50	

^{1} 274,856 electors were enrolled to vote at the election, but 12 of the 50 seats were uncontested—11 Labor seats (seven more than 1939, including all of the Fremantle seats) representing 57,651 enrolled voters, and one Nationalist seat representing 4,829 voters. The estimated swing from 1939 and 1943 was approximately 4% to Labor.

== Electoral districts ==
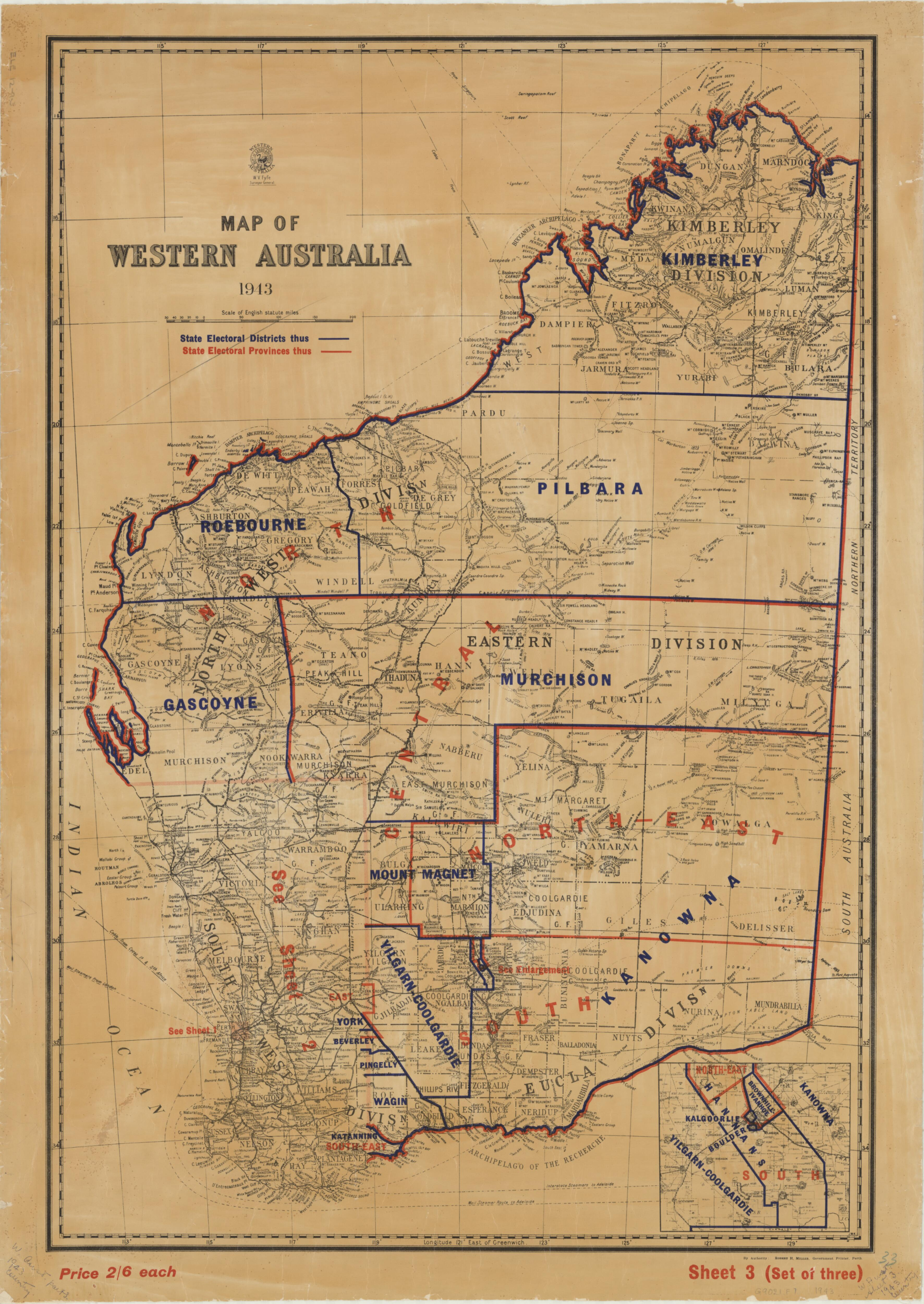
Outer regions

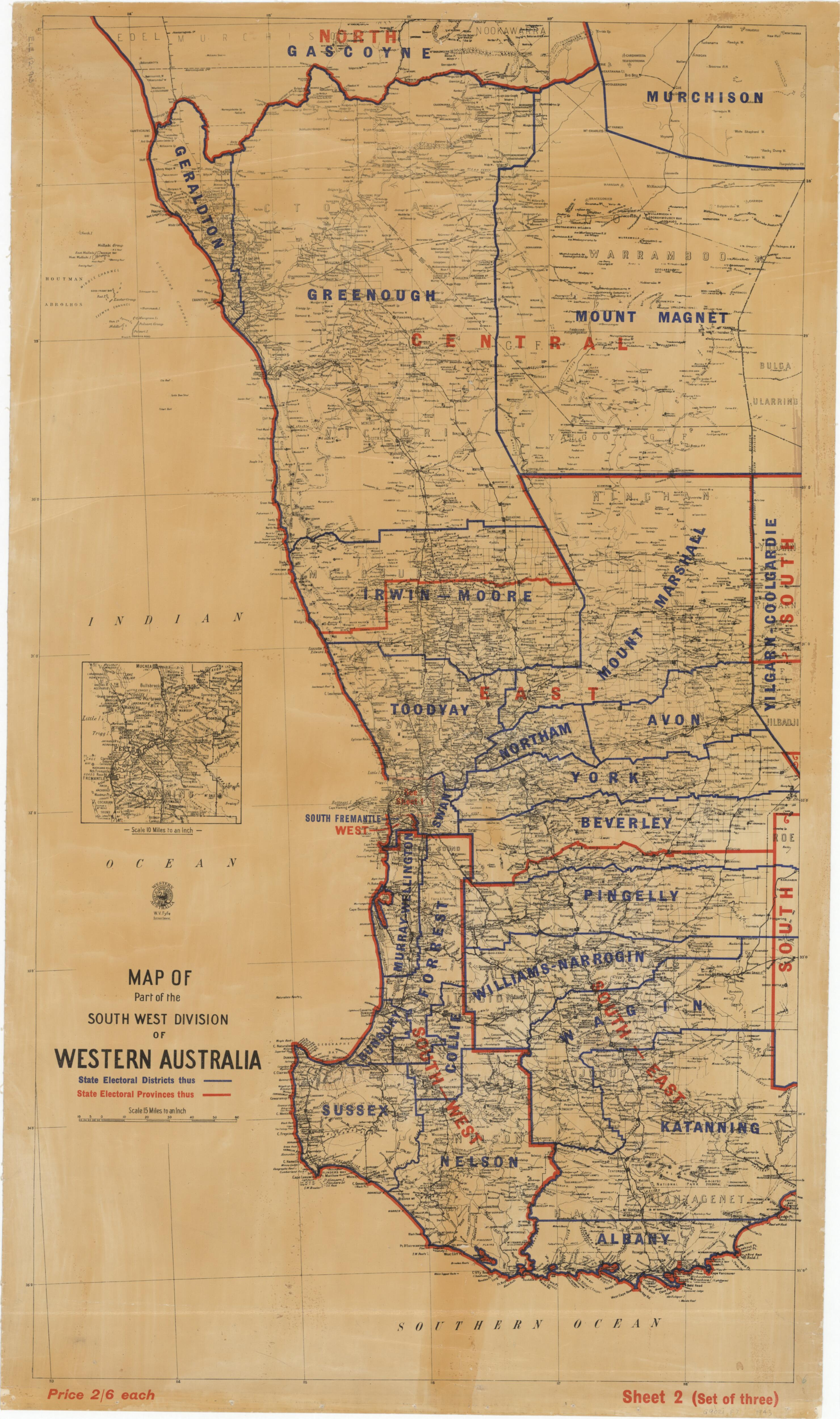
South-West

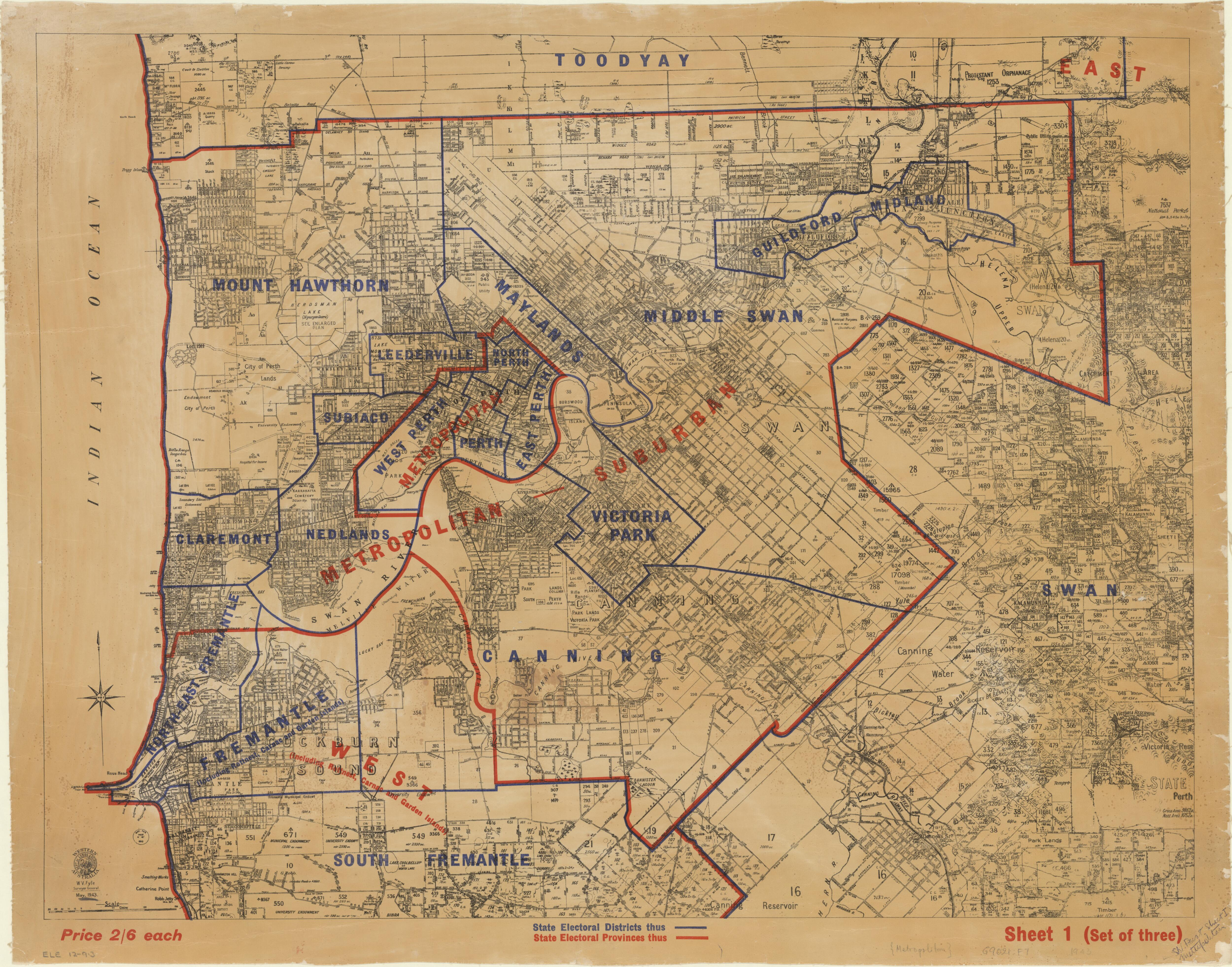
Metropolitan

== See also ==
- Candidates of the 1943 Western Australian state election
- Members of the Western Australian Legislative Assembly, 1939–1943
- Members of the Western Australian Legislative Assembly, 1943–1947
- Willcock Ministry
