= William Ardagh Gardner Walter =

William Walter

Personal details
- Born: 13 August 1860 Wilton, Somerset, England
- Died: 10 March 1940 (aged 79) Pembury, Kent, England
- Education: University of Oxford

William Ardagh Gardner Walter (13 August 1860 – 10 March 1940) was magistrate of Kalgoorlie, Western Australia. William enjoyed his education at Taunton College School and the University of Oxford. At Oxford he shone at Rugby football, cycling and as a rower in the Eight for Exeter College Boat Club.

In 1885 William migrated to Western Australia where initially he bought a farm at Tanjanerup near Nannup, which he sold a few years later in order to enter government service in 1891. He held several magistrate positions in the Western Australian goldfield in places like Murchison, Blackwood and Geraldton, eventually becoming first magistrate at Kalgoorlie in 1913. In March 1918 he fined the leader of the parliamentary opposition and future Western Australian Premier Philip Collier £25 for declarations 'likely to cause disaffection' during the conscription plebiscite. The fine was later remitted and costs refunded in an undefended action before the High Court of Australia.

In 1920 he left the goldfields to become magistrate in Perth. He remained there until May 1924 when he was compulsorily retired by the newly elected Collier Labor government. Collier was blamed for victimization, but the administration remained adamant.

Like in England, Walter was also an avid sportsman in Australia, playing tennis and cricket. Later on he also coached women scullers on the Swan River and was a member of the Western Australian Turf Club. He served as a member of the senate of the University of Western Australia and as part of high society in Western Australia he was a member of prestigious organisations like the Weld Club in Perth and Hannan's Club in Kalgoorlie. In 1926 he returned to England, where he died at Pembury, Kent, in 1940.

His brother, John Walter, migrated to Australia as well and became a member of the Legislative Assembly of Western Australia.
