= Victor Courtney =

Australian journalist and newspaper editor (1894–1970)

Victor Desmond Courtney
- Born: 27 May 1894; Raymond Terrace, New South Wales
- Died: 1 December 1970 (aged 76); Mount Lawley, Western Australia
- Occupation(s): Journalist, author, and newspaper proprietor.
- Spouse: Thela Pearl Richards (m. 1937) (d.1962)
- Children: 1 (Veecee)
- Parent(s): Henry Courtney; Katie Courtney (née O'Connor)

Victor Desmond Courtney (27 May 1894 – 1 December 1970) was a Western Australian journalist and newspaper editor.

He began writing early in life, gaining a published story in the Lone Hand in 1910.

He was in a partnership (with Jack Simons) in a weekly sporting newspaper, The Call.

He was involved with a Saturday-evening paper, The Mirror. During his time at the Sunday Times, he traveled with his wife before the second world war, as well as after the war writing about post war developments in the world and Australia, Courtney ultimately was the managing director of The Sunday Times and at the time, also owner of a network of thirty regional newspapers.

== Works ==
- (1941) Random Rhymes, Perth, the author.
- (1941) The man from Marble Bar [poem].First line: Satan sat by the fires of hell. in Random rhymes, 1941, p. 16 - reprinted in Grono, William (ed) (1988) Margins : a West Coast selection of poetry, 1829-1988 page 200. -
- (1946) Parlez vous [poem]. (first line) 'The reelers are at dinner tonight'.
- (1948) Cold is the Marble
- (1956) All I May Tell
- (1961) The Life Story of J. J. Simons
- (1962) Perth—and All This!
