= John Walter (politician) =

Australian politician

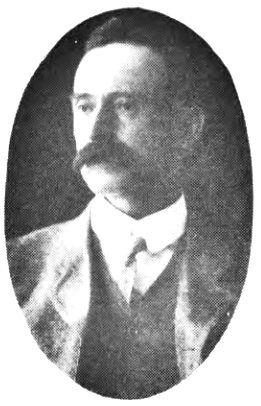

Member of the Legislative Assembly of Western Australia
- In office 11 December 1903 – 28 June 1904
- Preceded by: Sir James Lee-Steere
- Succeeded by: Charles Layman
- Constituency: Nelson

Personal details
- Born: 23 June 1863 Bishop's Hull, Somerset, England
- Died: 27 June 1944 (aged 81) Bridgetown, Western Australia
- Education: University of Oxford

John Russell Walter (23 June 1863 – 27 June 1944) was an Australian farmer and politician who was a member of the Legislative Assembly of Western Australia from 1903 to 1904, representing the seat of Nelson.

Walter was born in Bishop's Hull, Somerset, England. In February 1881, at 17 years of age, he entered into the University of Oxford, where, like his brother William, he competed in bicycle races as a member of the Oxford University Cycling Club. After leaving school, he lived in Canada for a period, spending two years at the Ontario Agricultural College in Toronto. He migrated to Western Australia in 1887, joining his older brother, William Ardagh Gardner Walter (later a well-known magistrate). After a few months near Busselton, Walter acquired a property near Bridgetown, where he farmed sheep. He was elected to the Nelson Road Board in 1901, and served until 1909, including as chairman for several periods. Following the death of Sir James Lee-Steere in December 1903, Walter was nominated for his vacant seat of Nelson, and was elected unopposed. Once in parliament, he sat as a Ministerialist (an opponent of the government of Walter James). However, Walter's time in parliament was short-lived, as he did not nominate for the 1904 state election. He recontested Nelson at the 1905 election, but was unsuccessful in regaining his seat, losing to his successor, Charles Layman. After leaving parliament, Walter remained active in local affairs in Bridgetown, serving as a justice of the peace and as president of the local agricultural society. He died in June 1944, aged 81.

Parliament of Western Australia
Preceded by Sir James Lee-Steere	Member for Nelson; 1903–1904	Succeeded by Charles Layman
