= John Hardwick (politician) =

Australian businessman and politician

Member of the Legislative Assembly of Western Australia
- In office 20 October 1904 – 3 October 1911
- Preceded by: Walter James
- Succeeded by: Titus Lander
- Constituency: East Perth
- In office 21 October 1914 – 12 May 1921
- Preceded by: Titus Lander
- Succeeded by: Jack Simons
- Constituency: East Perth

Personal details
- Born: 3 June 1867 East Perth, Western Australia, Australia
- Died: 5 August 1943 (aged 76) Kalgoorlie, Western Australia, Australia
- Party: Liberal (to 1917); Nationalist (from 1917)

John Edward Hardwick (3 June 1867 – 5 August 1943) was an Australian businessman and politician who was a member of the Legislative Assembly of Western Australia from 1904 to 1911 and again from 1914 to 1921. He represented the seat of East Perth on both occasions.

== Early life ==
Hardwick was born in Perth to Margaret (née McGuiness) and John Hardwick. As a youth, he was a talented player of Australian rules football, spending seven seasons in the West Australian Football Association. This included 16 games for West Australians (1887–1888), 15 games for Metropolitans (1889–1890), and 37 games for West Perth (1891–1893). Hardwick left Perth to work in York as a bootmaker and saddler, and then in 1894 went to the Eastern Goldfields, running a business in Coolgardie with his brother. He served as a Municipality of Coolgardie councillor from 1900 to 1901. He then returned to Perth, and was a member of the Perth City Council from 1901 to 1904.

== Politics ==
Hardwick entered parliament at the 1904 East Perth by-election, caused by the resignation of the premier, Walter James. He was re-elected at the 1905 and 1908 state elections, and had intended to stand again in 1911, but made a mistake in submitting his nomination and was thus unable to be listed on the ballot. His seat was won by Labor's Titus Lander. Hardwick reclaimed East Perth at the 1914 election, standing for the Liberal Party. He was re-elected at the 1917 election for the newly formed Nationalist Party, but at the 1921 election lost his seat to Labor's Jack Simons. He failed to even make the final two-candidate-preferred count. Hardwick made one final run for parliament at the 1922 Legislative Council elections, but lost to James Macfarlane.

== Later life ==
After leaving politics, Hardwick managed hotels at Dwellingup and Bolgart for periods. He died in Kalgoorlie in 1943, aged 76. He had married Esther Davis in 1895, with whom he had seven children, and was widowed in 1934.

Parliament of Western Australia
Preceded by Walter James; Titus Lander	Member for East Perth; 1904–1911; 1914–1921	Succeeded by Titus Lander; Jack Simons
