= James George Lee Steere =

Australian politician (1830–1903)

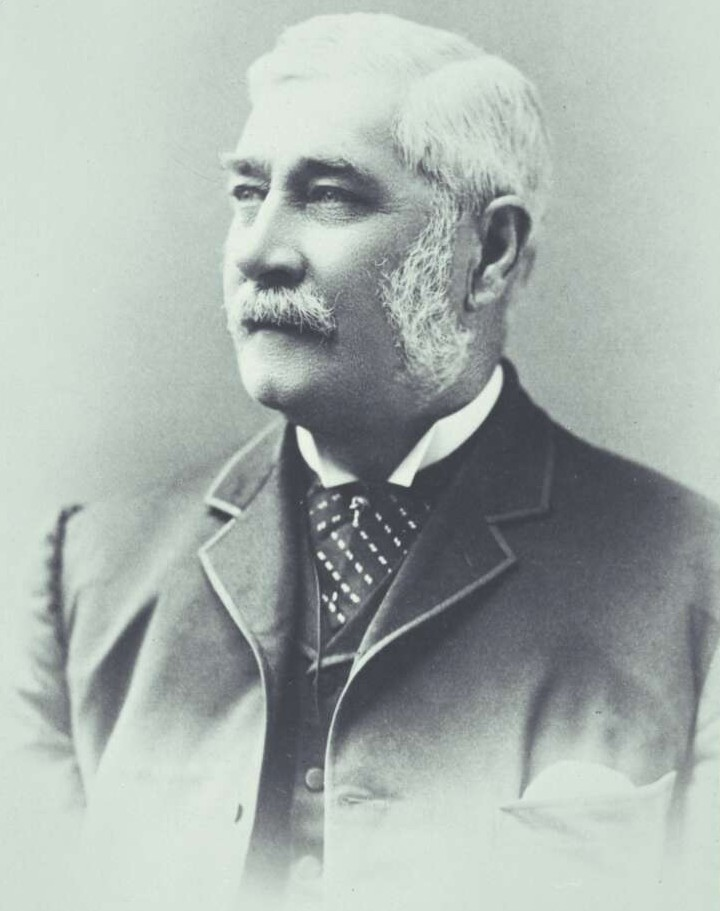
- Steere in 1898

1st Speaker of the Western Australian Legislative Assembly
- In office 30 December 1890 – 1 December 1903
- Preceded by: Position established
- Succeeded by: Charles Harper

Member of the Western Australian Legislative Council for Wellington
- In office 9 November 1870 – 13 February 1880
- Preceded by: Constituency created
- Succeeded by: Harry Venn

Member of the Western Australian Legislative Council for Swan
- In office 22 May 1880 – 24 October 1884
- Preceded by: E. T. Hooley
- Succeeded by: Henry Brockman

Member of the Western Australian Legislative Assembly for Nelson
- In office 28 November 1890 – 1 December 1903
- Preceded by: Constituency created
- Succeeded by: John Walter

Personal details
- Born: 4 July 1830 Ockley, England
- Died: 1 December 1903 (aged 73) Perth, Australia
- Resting place: Karrakatta Cemetery
- Spouse: Catherine Anne Leake
- Children: 15
- Relatives: Luke Leake (father-in-law)
- Occupation: Midshipman, pastoralist, politician

Sir James George Lee Steere KCMG (4 July 1830 – 1 December 1903) was an Australian politician. A prominent member of the six hungry families, he was a member of the Western Australian Legislative Council.

== Biography ==
Steere was born on 4 July 1830 in Ockley. He was the third of six sons of Lee Steere of Jayes, and his wife Anne, née Watson. He went to Clapham Grammar School. He was knighted in 1888, and appointed Knight Commander of the Order of St Michael and St George (KCMG) in the New Year Honours list January 1900.

Steere married Catherine Anne Leake, daughter of Sir Luke Leake, in 1859. They had 15 children, 11 of whom outlived him. Catherine died on 6 November 1922.

Steere died on 1 December 1903, aged 73, in Perth, and was buried at Karrakatta Cemetery. Florence Fuller posthumously painted his portrait, which was acquired by the Art Gallery of Western Australia.

== Notes ==
Western Australian Legislative Assembly
New seat	Member for Nelson; 1890–1903	Succeeded by John Walter
New title	Speaker of the Western Australian Legislative Assembly; 1890–1903	Succeeded by Charles Harper
