= Titus Lander =

Australian politician and animal welfare advocate

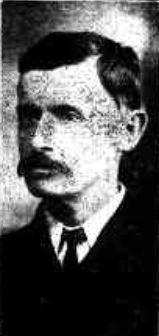

Member of the Legislative Assembly of Western Australia
- In office 3 October 1911 – 21 October 1914
- Preceded by: John Hardwick
- Succeeded by: John Hardwick
- Constituency: East Perth

Personal details
- Born: 5 April 1861 Harrow on the Hill, London, England
- Died: 8 January 1948 (aged 86) Maylands, Western Australia, Australia
- Party: Labor

Titus Lander (5 April 1861 – 8 January 1948) was an Australian politician and animal welfare advocate. He was the first salaried RSPCA inspector in Western Australia, and later served a single term in the state's Legislative Assembly (from 1911 to 1914), where he secured the passage of an animal welfare bill.

== Early life ==
Lander was born in London, England, to Margaret (née Moran) and James Brooke Lander. He trained as a stonemason, which had been his father's profession, and emigrated to South Australia in 1883. He later lived for periods in Victoria and New South Wales, working as a monumental mason. Lander arrived in Western Australia in October 1892. He initially continued in the masonry trade, but soon began volunteering as an inspector for the local branch of the SPCA. Lander began working full-time for the SPCA in 1894, and until 1906 was the organisation's only salaried inspector in Western Australia. In 1907, he had a gas chamber built at his home in Highgate, allowing stray cats and dogs to be euthanised humanely. Outside of his animal welfare work, Lander also sat the Sanitary Institute exams, allowing him to work as a food inspector for the Perth board of health.

== Politics and later life ==
Lander was elected to the Perth City Council in 1909, and to parliament at the 1911 state election, standing for the Labor Party in the seat of East Perth. His candidacy was helped by the fact that the sitting member, John Hardwick, made a mistake in submitting his nomination and was thus unable to be listed on the ballot. In parliament, Lander introduced a bill which was eventually passed into law as the Prevention of Cruelty to Animals Act 1912, the first of its kind in Western Australia. His time as an MP was short, however, as Hardwick reclaimed the seat at the 1914 election. After leaving politics, Lander bought a farm in Bruce Rock, also providing veterinary services for the surrounding area. He retired to Merredin in 1936, and died in Perth in 1948, aged 86. He had married Lucinda Jane Beattie in 1887, with whom he had four children.

Parliament of Western Australia
Preceded by John Hardwick	Member for East Perth; 1911–1914	Succeeded by John Hardwick
