= Jayes =

Jayes is an English surname. Notable people with the surname include:

- Brian Jayes (1932–1978), English football player
- Laura Jayes (born 1983), Australian journalist and television presenter
- Thomas Jayes (1877–1913), English cricket player
