= Charles Layman =

Australian politician

Member of the Legislative Assembly of Western Australia
- In office 28 June 1904 – 21 October 1914
- Preceded by: John Walter
- Succeeded by: Francis Willmott
- Constituency: Nelson

Personal details
- Born: 4 June 1865 Wonnerup, Western Australia
- Died: 23 March 1926 (aged 60) Bridgetown, Western Australia

Charles Henry Layman (4 June 1865 – 23 March 1926) was an Australian politician who was a member of the Legislative Assembly of Western Australia from 1904 to 1914, representing the seat of Nelson.

Layman was born in Wonnerup (a rural locality near Busselton) to Amelia Harriet (née Curtis) and George Layman. His father was also a member of parliament, as was a cousin, Ernest Locke. Layman attended The High School in Perth, and after leaving worked for the W.A. Timber Company for two years before going into farming. From 1888, he kept a store in Greenbushes, which supplied the nearby tin mine. Layman served on the Greenbushes Road Board from 1898 to 1904, including as chairman for a period. He entered parliament at the 1904 state election, winning the seat of Nelson as an independent.

Layman switched to the Ministerialists prior to the 1905 election, where he was re-elected with an increased majority. He was again comfortably re-elected in 1908, but in 1911 won only narrowly, defeating a Labor candidate by just 54 votes on the two-party-preferred count. Layman retired from parliament at the 1914 election, and died in Bridgetown in March 1926, aged 60. He had married Florence Edith Reynolds in 1893, with whom he had five sons and three daughters.

Parliament of Western Australia
Preceded by John Walter	Member for Nelson; 1904–1914	Succeeded by Francis Willmott
