= Jack Simons =

Australian businessman and politician

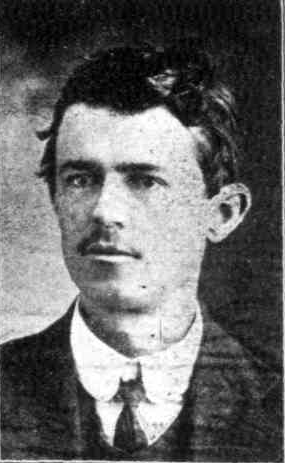
John "Jack" Simons in 1908

John "Jack" Joseph Simons (also widely known and referred to as J. J. Simons and J. J. "Boss" Simons (12 August 1882 – 24 October 1948) was an Australian businessman and politician, best known for establishing the Young Australia League.

== Early life ==
Simons was born at Clare, South Australia to Thomas Simons, a currier, and Margaret Simons, née Henry, a schoolteacher. In about 1896 he arrived at Fremantle, Western Australia where he worked for a tinsmith. He developed an interest in labour issues with a strong belief in nationalist policies as well as becoming a prominent advocate against conscription. At 6 feet 4 inches (1.93 m) he was confident and charismatic and developed strong debating skills.

== Australian rules football Administrator ==
He was secretary of the Western Australian Football League from 1905 to 1914 and in 1905 established the Young Australia Football League. The same year together with Lionel Boas, the YAFL was renamed to become the Young Australia League which aimed to promote healthy outdoor activities for Western Australian youth, particularly boys. The organisation flourished for many years and expanded to other states. Simons was referred to by YAL members as "Boss Simons".

Simons was West Australia's delegate to the Australasian Football Council in the 1900s and 1910s.

Simons acted as tour manager for most representative teams including the West Australian team.

Simons promotional work led to the establishment of Australian rules football in the United States and Canada, the first Australian national team to tour overseas and the first two national teams dedicated to the sport to tour Australia.

== Education ==
He was secretary of the Western Australian State School Teachers Union until 1917 and was State president of the Australian Natives' Association in 1910–11. He was secretary of the Western Australian Trotting Association in 1913–14, later being made a life member.

== Politics ==
In the 1917 federal election he unsuccessfully contested the Division of Fremantle for Labor. Simons campaigned with John Curtin until they disagreed after Simons wrote newspaper articles criticising trade unionists, referring to strikers as "Trade Union Trash". In 1921 he won the Seat of East Perth in the state parliament. He resigned his seat on 1 November 1922 and subsequently nominated as a candidate for the resulting by-election on 18 November 1922, but was defeated by the Labor candidate, Thomas Hughes.

He supported Premier James Mitchell's land development and migration programmes and the ill-fated Kendenup community established by Jack De Garis in 1920. Simons Road in the town is named in his honour.

== Publishing ==
Simons was active in publishing, producing an annual Australian Junior from 1906 to 1911 as well as the monthly Boomerang, edited from 1914 by himself as an extension to YAL activities. In 1918 he established the Call, a sports focussed weekly newspaper with Victor Courtney, and in 1921 in a partnership with Courtney purchased a struggling Saturday-evening paper, The Mirror building its circulation during the 1920s to over 10,000. In 1926 Simons published Reflections, a collection of his own beliefs and experiences.

In 1935, a syndicate led by Simons and including Courtney and mining entrepreneur Claude de Bernales purchased Western Press Limited, the publishers of The Sunday Times for £55,000. Simons was managing director until his death in 1948.

== Death ==
Simons died of heart disease in 1948 and was buried in the Roman Catholic section of Karrakatta Cemetery. His epitaph reads "I am the Spirit of the League".

Several years before his death he assigned his interest in Western Press to the Y.A.L. which yielded over £50,000 to the organisation.

When the 3-tier grandstand at Subiaco Oval was opened on 31 August 1969, it was named the "J J Simons-W R Orr-R W Hill Grandstand", partly in his honour. In 2019, Simons was inducted into the West Australian Football Hall of Fame.
