= Clarence Doust =

Australian politician

Member of the Legislative Assembly of Western Australia
- In office 15 February 1936 – 18 March 1939
- Preceded by: Jack Smith
- Succeeded by: Jack Smith
- Constituency: Nelson

Personal details
- Born: 3 August 1885 Balbarrup, Western Australia, Australia
- Died: 19 April 1961 (aged 75) Manjimup, Western Australia, Australia
- Party: Independent

Clarence Isaac Doust (3 August 1885 – 19 April 1961) was an Australian farmer and politician who was an independent member of the Legislative Assembly of Western Australia from 1936 to 1939, representing the seat of Nelson.

Doust was born in Balbarrup, Western Australia (near Manjimup), to Mary (née Needes) and Abraham Doust. After leaving school, he was employed as a secretary by the Warren Road Board, as well as having his own farm. Doust enlisted in the Australian Imperial Force in August 1916, and served in France with a medical unit. He returned to Australia after the war's end, working for periods as an Agricultural Bank inspector and land valuer before returning to his previous position as road board secretary. Doust was a supporter of the social credit movement (although not associated with its political arm), and was president of the local chapter.

At the 1936 state election, Doust ran for parliament and defeated Jack Smith (a 15-year incumbent) with 57.1 percent of the two-party-preferred vote. After the election, Doust announced that he would give "general support" to the Labor government of Philip Collier, adding to its narrow majority. However, his time in parliament was short-lived, as he placed only third on first preferences at the 1939 state election and had his seat reclaimed by Smith. Doust returned to farming after his defeat, and died in Manjimup in April 1961, aged 75. He had married Agnes Helen Giblett in 1909, with whom he had five children.

Parliament of Western Australia
| Preceded by Jack Smith | Member for Nelson; 1936–1939 | Succeeded by Jack Smith |
