= Thomas Hughes (Australian politician) =

Australian politician

Tom Hughes

Member of the Western Australian Parliament for East Perth
- In office 18 November 1922 – 1927
- Preceded by: Jack Simons
- Succeeded by: James Kenneally

Member of the Western Australian Parliament for East Perth
- In office 1936–1943
- Preceded by: James Kenneally
- Succeeded by: Herb Graham

Personal details
- Born: Thomas John Hughes; 9 September 1892 South Melbourne, Australia
- Died: 6 August 1980 (aged 87) Subiaco, Australia
- Party: Labor Party, Independent
- Spouse: Lucy Stone
- Profession: Auditor, Lawyer

Thomas John Hughes (9 September 1892 – 6 November 1980), sometimes known as Diver Hughes, was an Australian politician, and a member of the Western Australian Legislative Assembly representing the seat of East Perth for two periods; from 1922 until 1927, and again from 1936 until 1943.

== Biography ==
Hughes was born in South Melbourne, Victoria, to Felix Hughes, a labourer, and his wife Maria (née Boudan). In 1896, the family moved to Western Australia, and he was educated at state schools. He obtained work in the Postmaster General's Office as a telegraph boy, before entering the commonwealth public service as an audit inspector. In his spare time, he rowed for Western Australia in 1914 and 1920. He was also a talented Australian rules footballer, playing for two West Australian Football League (WAFL) clubs (East Fremantle, two matches, and East Perth, 46 games).

During this time he joined the Labor Party, and was both president of the Metropolitan Council and a member of the state executive. He was selected to run for the party at a by-election on 18 November 1922 in East Perth, following the resignation of J. J. Simons, and won the seat. Shortly after his election on 20 December 1922, he married Lucy Olive Stone in Inglewood. In 1926, he resigned from the Labor Party and sat from then as an Independent Labor member; however did not contest the seat at the 1927 election, the seat being won by railwayman and unionist James Kenneally.

After this, he practiced as an accountant and as secretary of the Mental Nurses' Union. He also gained his bachelor of laws in 1932 and was admitted to the bar in 1936.

Having unsuccessfully contested elections for his old seat in 1930, and for West Province in the legislative council in 1934, he was successful in unseating Kenneally, by this stage a minister in the Collier government. However, it emerged that he had been an undischarged bankrupt at the time of the poll, and was hence ineligible to run, and Kenneally successfully petitioned for the poll to be declared void. A by-election was called for 9 May 1936, and Hughes, who had resolved his status in the interim, won again against Kenneally.

He sat as a member until 1943, before resigning to contest Division of Perth in the 1943 federal election. He was unsuccessful in this, and at the 1945 Fremantle by-election.

He died aged 88 at the Home of Peace in Subiaco, and was buried in the Uniting Church section of Karrakatta Cemetery.

Parliament of Western Australia
Preceded by Jack Simons	Member for East Perth; 1922–1927	Succeeded by James Kenneally
Preceded by James Kenneally	Member for East Perth; 1936–1943	Succeeded by Herb Graham
