= Herb Graham =

Australian politician

The Honourable Herb Graham OMRI

Deputy Premier of Western Australia
- In office 3 March 1971 – 30 May 1973

Member of the Western Australian Parliament for Balcatta
- In office 31 March 1962 – 30 May 1973
- Preceded by: New creation
- Succeeded by: Brian Burke

Member of the Western Australian Parliament for East Perth
- In office 14 August 1943 – 31 March 1962
- Preceded by: Thomas Hughes
- Succeeded by: Seat abolished

Personal details
- Born: Herbert Ernst Graham; 6 April 1911 Narrogin, Western Australia
- Died: 17 March 1982 (aged 70) Stirling, Western Australia
- Party: Labor Party
- Spouses: Norma Eileen Wilson (m. 1936–1951) Beryl Grace Kirkby (m. 1952–1982)
- Relations: Larry Graham (nephew)
- Profession: Draftsman

Herbert Ernst Graham (6 April 1911 – 17 March 1982) was an Australian politician.

== Biography ==
Graham was born in Narrogin, Western Australia on 6 April 1911 to parents from South Australia. Graham attended school in Narrogin and Northam.

His father, farmer William Graham, was a candidate for the Western Australian Legislative Council in the 1912 Legislative Council election. He later unsuccessfully stood for the Australian Senate in 1919, finishing with only 2% of the Western Australian vote.

His nephew, Larry Graham later represented the Labor Party in the Western Australian Parliament from 1989.

== Working life ==
In 1928, Graham joined the Western Australian Government Department of Lands and Surveys as a cadet draftsman. In the mid-1930s, he joined the Department of Forests.

== Public life ==
=== Early politics ===
After joining the Australian Labor Party in 1929 he soon became heavily involved in politics. By 1933 he was a member of the ALP state executive. In 1934 he was an unsuccessful candidate for the House of Representatives seat of Perth. In 1940 he was a candidate for the Senate though he only garnered 2% of the Western Australian vote, the same percentage as his father in 1919.

=== Entry to Parliament ===
In 1943 Graham was elected to the seat of East Perth in a by-election caused by the resignation of Tom Hughes.

With the election of the Hawke Labor government in 1953 Graham became a Cabinet minister with responsibilities for the portfolios of housing and forests. As housing minister Graham was responsible for an increase in the number of state-owned residential properties. An apartment complex, Graham Flats in West Perth, built while he was housing minister, was named in his honour. In 1957 Graham took on responsibility for transport, presiding over the implementation of an integrated bus system.

Between 1959 and 1971 Graham served the ALP in opposition, rising to deputy opposition leader in 1966. When the Tonkin government took power in 1971 Graham became Deputy Premier. He took on responsibility for town planning between 1971 and 1973.

In 1973 after a series of disagreements with Tonkin, Graham resigned from Parliament. In the by-election that followed, Brian Burke was elected by thirty votes.

=== Civic life ===
After leaving Parliament Graham was appointed chairman of the state Licensing Court.

A fluent Italian-speaker, Graham was involved in the Western Australia Italian Club, becoming a life member of the club. He was honoured by the Italian government with an Order of Merit of the Italian Republic.

He was a patron of the East Perth Football Club and was a life member.

== Death ==
Graham died on 17 March 1982 in Stirling, Western Australia.
