= John Henry Smith (politician) =

Australian politician

John Smith

Member of the Legislative Assembly of Western Australia
- In office 12 March 1921 – 15 February 1936
- Preceded by: Francis Willmott
- Succeeded by: Clarence Doust
- Constituency: Nelson
- In office 18 March 1939 – 20 November 1943
- Preceded by: Clarence Doust
- Succeeded by: Ernest Hoar
- Constituency: Nelson

Personal details
- Born: 16 June 1881 Bridgetown, Western Australia, Australia
- Died: 18 January 1953 (aged 71) Pinjarra, Western Australia, Australia
- Party: Labor (to 1917); Country (1922–1924); Nationalist (1924–1943)
- Other political affiliations: Independent (1917–1922, 1950)

John Henry "Jack" Smith (16 June 1881 – 18 January 1953) was an Australian politician who was a member of the Legislative Assembly of Western Australia from 1921 to 1936 and again from 1939 to 1943, on both occasions representing the seat of Nelson. He stood for parliament eleven times in total, winning on six occasions.

Smith was born in Bridgetown, Western Australia, to Eliza (née Cain) and Joseph Smith. After leaving school, he worked as a tin miner in Greenbushes for eight years, and later became the licensee of a Bridgetown hotel. He also served on the Bridgetown Road Board, including as chairman for a period. Smith was president of the local branch of the Labor Party until 1917, when he left the party. He first stood for parliament at the 1917 state election, running as an "independent Labor" candidate, but was defeated by Francis Willmott (the sitting Country Party member) in the seat of Nelson. At the 1920 Legislative Council elections, he contested South-West Province as an independent, but was again defeated by a sitting member, Ephraim Clarke of the Nationalist Party. Smith eventually entered parliament at the 1921 state election, standing as an "independent Country" candidate and defeating Willmott (his earlier opponent) in Nelson.

In September 1922, Smith left the crossbench to join the Country Party. When the party split into two opposing factions in 1923, he joined the Ministerial faction, which supported the government of James Mitchell and the coalition with the Nationalist Party. He retained his seat at the 1924 state election, and after the election became a Nationalist himself, as with most other members of his faction. Smith was re-elected at the 1927, 1930, and 1933 elections, but in 1936 lost his seat to an independent, Clarence Doust, by a large margin. He reclaimed the seat in 1939, but in 1943 lost to Labor's Ernest Hoar by just 17 votes. Smith ran for parliament one last time in 1950, at the age of 68, standing as an independent in the new seat of Blackwood and losing to John Hearman of the Liberal Party by a narrow margin. He died in Pinjarra in January 1953, aged 71. He had married Mary Agnes Murnan in 1907, with whom he had two daughters.

Parliament of Western Australia
Preceded by Francis Willmott; Clarence Doust	Member for Nelson; 1921–1936; 1939–1943	Succeeded by Clarence Doust; Ernest Hoar
