= Walter James (Australian politician) =

Australian politician

Sir Walter James KCMG, KC
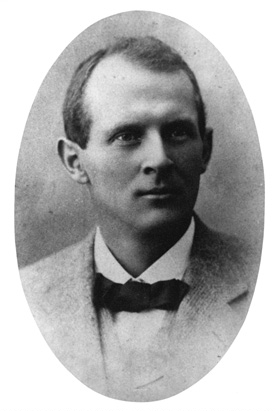
- Walter James, from the Western Australian Government Photographer Collection

5th Premier of Western Australia
- In office 1 July 1902 – 10 August 1904
- Monarch: Edward VII
- Governor: Sir Arthur Lawley; Sir Frederick Bedford
- Preceded by: George Leake
- Succeeded by: Henry Daglish

Personal details
- Born: Walter Hartwell James; 29 March 1863 Perth, Western Australia
- Died: 3 January 1943 (aged 79) Perth, Western Australia
- Party: Unaligned

Sir Walter Hartwell James KCMG, (29 March 1863 – 3 January 1943) was the fifth Premier of Western Australia and an ardent supporter of the federation movement.

== Background and early career ==
James was born in Perth, in what was then the British colony of Western Australia. He was educated at Perth Boys School and later at Perth High School (now Hale School). After his father's death, his mother remarried to George Randell, a member of the Legislative Council. James was thus the step-brother of Ernest Randell, who later played cricket for Western Australia. In his youth, James worked as a jackaroo at De Grey Station in the Pilbara, but after being shipwrecked off Rottnest Island in 1883 on his way to the Pilbara, he turned to the legal profession. He was articled to George Leake in 1883, and was admitted to the Western Australian bar in 1888. Shortly afterwards he went into partnership with Leake. James also played football for the Rovers Football Club in the West Australian Football Association. He later served as secretary of the Association. On 21 June 1892, he married Eleanora Marie Gwenifryd Hearder.

== Political career ==
From 1890 to 1896, James represented Central Ward on Perth City Council. In 1894 he was elected to the Legislative Assembly seat of East Perth. James sat in the Legislative Assembly as an independent, and was a consistent opponent of John Forrest's government. He was a strong advocate for social reform, working for women's suffrage over a long period, and playing an active part in the establishment of a compulsory, free, secular education system. He became an active member of the Western Australian Liberal Association, a reformist organisation that pursued liberal ideals.

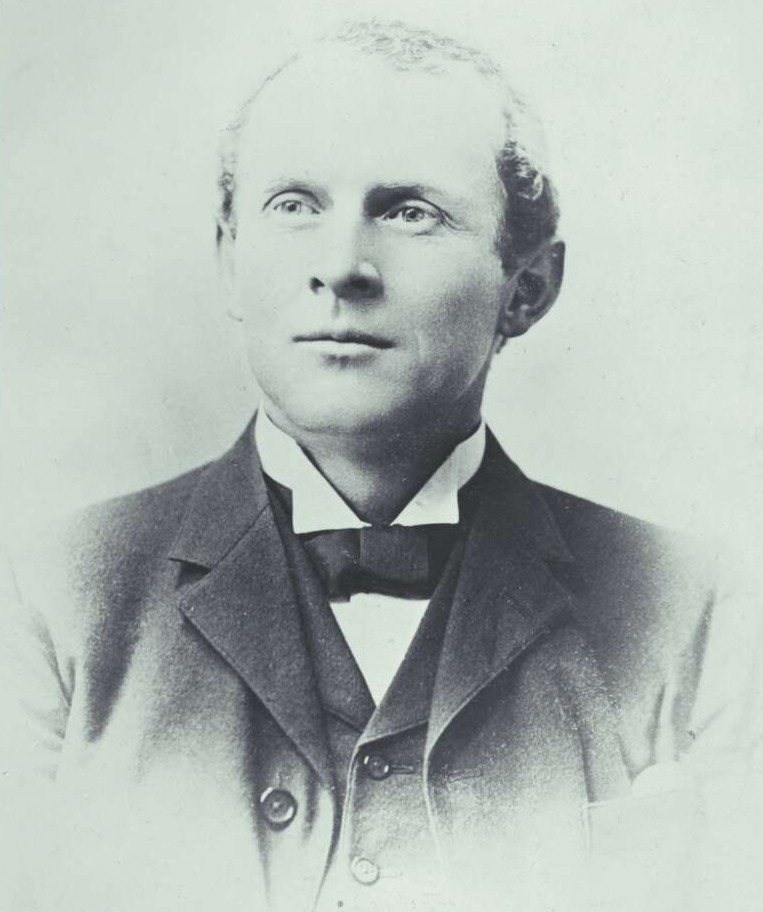
Walter James in the 1898 Australasian Federal Convention Album.

James was also strongly in favour of federation, and campaigned heavily with George Leake and James Gardiner for Western Australia to become an original member of the Federation. He was a member of the Western Australian delegation to the Federal Conventions of 1897 and 1898, but missed three quarters of its votes, the worst absence record of any delegate. In May 1898 he helped found the Federal League, and in the same month Edmund Barton thanked James for his "generous contributions" to the Yes campaign in the NSW federation referendum.

On 28 June 1901, James was appointed minister without portfolio in the first Leake government. In 1902 he was made KC. After Leake died in late June 1902, "Nutty" James, as he was popularly known, was appointed Premier and Attorney-General on 1 July. As premier, James fought for the state's interests against an aggressive Commonwealth executive. He also led a reforming government; its achievements include legalization of the union movement, the first workers' compensation, a stronger Arbitration Act, and the opening of the current Parliament House. James also tried but failed to reform the franchise; he achieved only the abolition of plural voting, and an increase in Goldfields representation. These changes appear to have been his undoing, as it is likely that they were key factors in Labor's strong support in the election of 28 June 1904, after which James was defeated when Parliament next met on 10 August 1904.

== Post-political career ==
On 22 September 1904, James resigned from parliament to take up an appointment as Agent-General for Western Australia in London. He was appointed Knight Bachelor on 28 June 1907. After returning to Perth from London, he devoted himself to his legal practice and rose to prominence as a leading member of the Bar. In 1910 he contested the Legislative Assembly seat of Beverley at a by-election, but was unsuccessful.

James was involved with the East Perth Cricket Club (now Perth Cricket Club) in the WACA and served a two-season term as President of the club from 1908 to 1910.

In 1909, James was appointed to a Royal Commission to enquire into the establishment of a university in Perth. When the University of Western Australia was established, he became a founding member. He continued to serve the university for many years, and was elected pro-Chancellor on 19 August 1929 and Chancellor on 17 March 1930; and retired in 1936.

== 1915 Misrepresentation of Bishop Hale and the High School ==
In 1915 James wrote the first known published document falsely claiming a direct link between Bishop Hale's School founded in 1858, and the High School founded in 1876. His two-page editorial in the High School magazine Cygnet of 1915, was later fully debunked in 1929 by Edith Cowan during attempts by the High School to rename the School after Bishop Hale. She pointed to a statement by Mr. Alfred Burt, a pupil of Bishop Hale's School, and Registrar of Titles for many years, sent to the Diocesan Secretary on September 25, 1929, that Bishop Hale's School was a legal entity under the Church of England Collegiate School Act that remained in force for at least 10 years after the High School Act was passed and parts of that Act were still operating in 1929. Cowan noted Burt's contention that the present High or Hale School had no right to claim that their school was founded in 1858 (vide an advertisement of February 1929) or that the old Hale School boys should be called High School boys. Cowan particularly condemned the High School's new Coat of Arms misleading use of the Hale family crest, the use of a fictitious motto "Duty" falsely ascribed to the Bishop, and the High School's claiming 1858 as their own foundation date.

Despite her best efforts, the WA Parliament approved the change of the name in 1929, and did not take seriously the misrepresentations, patently false associations, and false sponsorship claims attempting to connect the secular state High School to Bishop Hale's private religious school, and which were even at that time significant breaches of contract law (fraudulent misrepresentation) and the Federal Trade Marks Act 1905 (False Marking). These continuing historic breaches leave High/Hale School still exposed to actionable complaints under Australian Consumer Law S29(1)(e),(f),(g) and (h).

However, instead of a prosecution, James was rewarded with significant honours and lucrative offers from the WA State Government. In 1931, James was elevated to KCMG. In 1932, he declined an offer from Premier James Mitchell to become Lieutenant-Governor of Western Australia. In 1936, he accepted an honorary degree of Doctor of Laws. He died on 3 January 1943, and was buried at Karrakatta Cemetery.

== See also ==
- 1904 East Perth state by-election

Political offices
Preceded by George Leake	Premier of Western Australia; 1902–1904	Succeeded by Henry Daglish
Academic offices
Preceded by Dr Athelstan Saw	Chancellor of the University of Western Australia; 1930–1936	Succeeded by Dr James Battye
