= James Kenneally =

Australian politician (1879–1954)

James Joseph Kenneally (15 May 1879 – 9 October 1954) was an Australian politician, railwayman and unionist from Sydney. He served as federal president of the Labor Party in the 1930s.

== Education and early career ==
Educated by the Christian Brothers, he moved to Western Australia in 1899 where he became a locomotive cleaner and then engine-driver. He was president of the West Australian Locomotive Engine-drivers', Firemen's and Cleaners' Union of Workers in 1914 and was secretary in 1919.

== Political career ==
He was a member for East Perth in the Western Australian Legislative Assembly from 1927 to 1936, representing the Labor Party. He served as federal president of the party in the 1930s, during a time when a far-left faction from New South Wales was battling its Jack Lang-led right-wing representatives in the ALP. He and the party unsuccessfully called for unity at the time of the worldwide depression. Things became so bitter that both factions briefly formed their own parties in the 1940s; Lang's was his second breakaway party.
