= Electoral district of Nelson =

Former state electoral district of Western Australia

Nelson Western Australia—Legislative Assembly
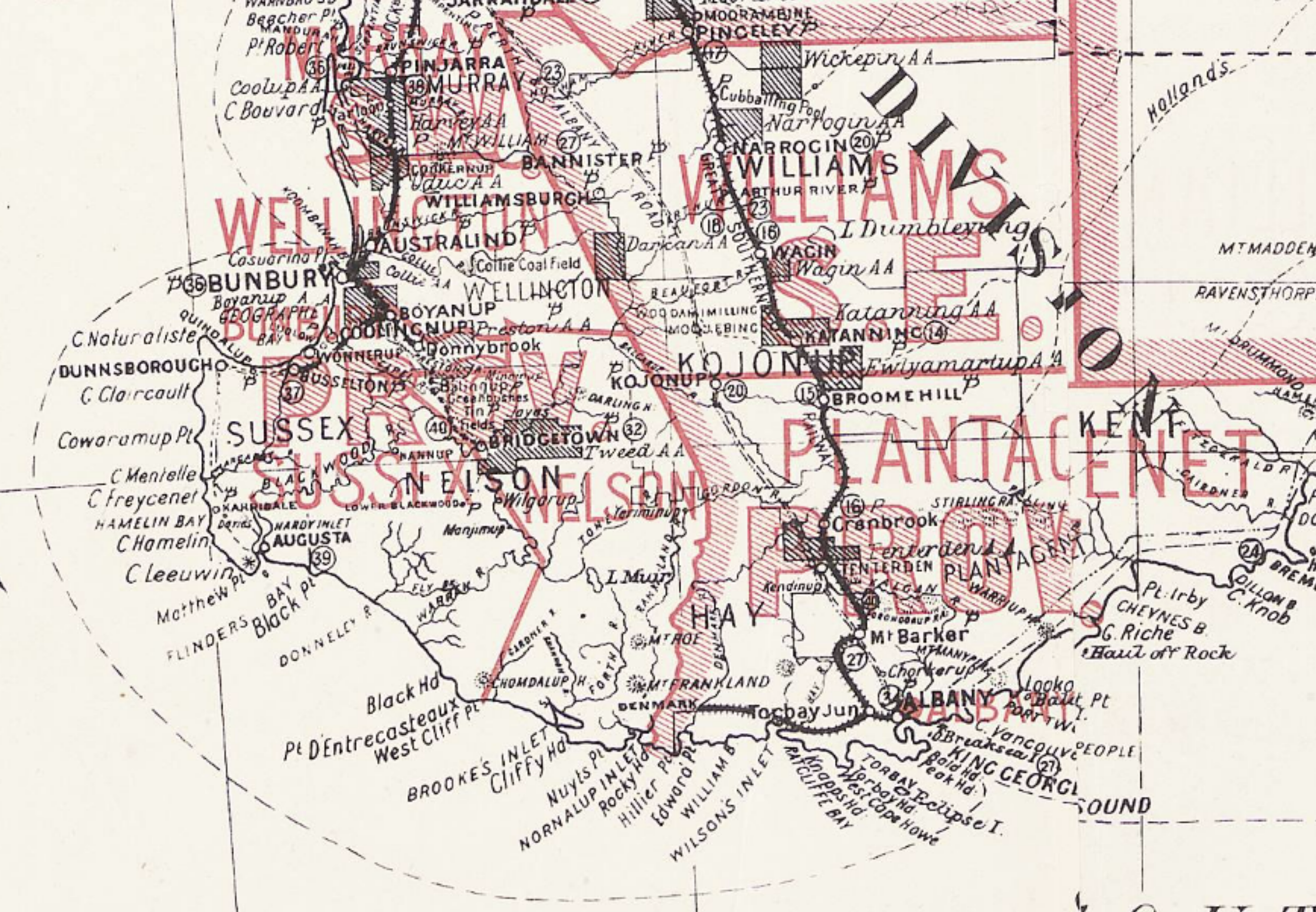
- Nelson and surrounds in 1898
- State: Western Australia
- Dates current: 1890–1950
- Namesake: Nelson Land District

Nelson was an electoral district of the Legislative Assembly in the Australian state of Western Australia from 1890 to 1950.

The district was based in the south-western part of Western Australia, including towns such as Manjimup and Pemberton, and was named for the Nelson land district which formed its original boundaries. It was one of the original 30 seats contested at the 1890 election. In 1898, its major settlement was Bridgetown and it also included the Greenbushes tin fields.

Nelson was abolished at the 1950 election. Its last member, Ernest Hoar of the Labor Party, transferred to the new seat of Warren.

== Members ==
Member	Party	Term
James George Lee-Steere	Independent	1890–1897
James George Lee-Steere	Ministerial	1897–1903
John Walter	Ministerial	1903–1904
Charles Layman	Independent	1904–1905
Charles Layman	Ministerial	1905–1911
Charles Layman	Liberal	1911–1914
Francis Willmott	Country	1914–1921
John Henry Smith	Independent	1921–1922
John Henry Smith	Country	1922–1923
John Henry Smith	Country (MCP)	1923–1924
John Henry Smith	Nationalist	1924–1936
Clarence Doust	Independent	1936–1939
John Henry Smith	Nationalist	1939–1943
Ernest Hoar	Labor	1943–1950
