= Electoral district of East Perth =

Former electoral district in Perth, Western Australia

East Perth Western Australia—Legislative Assembly
- State: Western Australia
- Dates current: 1890–1962
- Namesake: East Perth

East Perth was an electoral district of the Legislative Assembly in the Australian state of Western Australia from 1890 to 1962.

Based in inner urban Perth, the district was one of the original 30 seats contested at the 1890 election. The district's member from 1894 to 1904 was Walter James, who served as Premier of Western Australia from 1902 to 1904. When the district was abolished at the 1962 election, its member at the time, Herb Graham of the Labor Party, transferred to the new seat of Balcatta.

== Members ==
Member	Party	Term
Alfred Canning	Unaligned	1890–1894
Walter James	Opposition	1894–1904
John Hardwick	Ministerial	1904–1911
Titus Lander	Labor	1911–1914
John Hardwick	Liberal	1914–1917
John Hardwick	Nationalist	1917–1921
Jack Simons	Labor	1921–1922
Jack Simons	Independent	1922
Jack Simons	Nationalist	1922
Thomas Hughes	Labor	1922–1926
Thomas Hughes	Ind. Labor	1926–1927
James Kenneally	Labor	1927–1936
Thomas Hughes	Ind. Labor	1936–1943
Herb Graham	Labor	1943–1962
