= Results of the 1939 Western Australian state election (Legislative Assembly) =

Western Australian state election, 18 March 1939 Legislative Assembly << 1936–1943 >>
Enrolled voters	228,563 (Note: 265,987 electors were enrolled to vote at the election, but 10 of the 50 seats were uncontested—4 Labor seats representing 9,414 enrolled voters, 2 Nationalist seats representing 11,396 voters and 4 Country seats representing 16,614 voters.)				
Votes cast	209,331		Turnout	91.59%	+21.46%
Informal votes	3,660		Informal	1.75%	+0.63%
Summary of votes by party
Party	Primary votes	%	Swing	Seats	Change
Labor	92,585	45.02%	+2.63%	27	+ 1
Nationalist	49,307	23.97%	–8.39%	7	– 1
Country	24,681	12.00%	–2.60%	12	– 1
Ind. Nat.	13,977	6.80%	+4.26%	2	+ 1
Communist	308	0.15%	+0.06%	0	± 0
Independent	24,813	12.06%	+5.07%	2	± 0
Total	205,671			50	

This is a list of electoral district results of the 1939 Western Australian election.

== Results by electoral district ==
=== Albany ===
1939 Western Australian state election: Albany
Party	Candidate	Votes	%	±%
Country	Leonard Hill	1,854	46.1	+8.2
Labor	Arthur Wansbrough	1,711	42.5	+3.8
Ind. Nationalist	Charles Hammond	374	9.3	+9.3
Independent	James Bolitho	84	2.1	+2.1
Total formal votes		4,023	97.9	−1.3
Informal votes		85	2.1	+1.3
Turnout		4,108	90.2	+14.3
Two-party-preferred result
Country	Leonard Hill	2,203	54.8	−2.8
Labor	Arthur Wansbrough	1,820	45.2	+2.8
Country hold		Swing	−2.8	

=== Avon ===
1939 Western Australian state election: Avon
Party	Candidate	Votes	%	±%
Country	Ignatius Boyle	1,972	57.7	+4.8
Independent Country	John Tankard	1,445	42.3	+42.3
Total formal votes		3,417	97.5	−0.5
Informal votes		89	2.5	+0.5
Turnout		3,506	93.5	+25.9
Country hold		Swing	N/A	

=== Beverley ===
1939 Western Australian state election: Beverley
Party	Candidate	Votes	%	±%
Country	James Mann	unopposed		
Country hold		Swing		

=== Boulder ===
1939 Western Australian state election: Boulder
Party	Candidate	Votes	%	±%
Labor	Philip Collier	2,039	61.6	−38.4
Independent	Walter Coath	961	29.1	+29.1
Communist	Wilfred Mountjoy	308	9.3	+9.3
Total formal votes		3,308	98.2	
Informal votes		62	1.8	
Turnout		3,370	95.1	
Labor hold		Swing	N/A	

- Preferences were not distributed.

=== Brown Hill-Ivanhoe ===
1939 Western Australian state election: Brown Hill-Ivanhoe
Party	Candidate	Votes	%	±%
Labor	Frederick Smith	2,156	71.3	−28.7
Nationalist	Wesley Moore	868	28.7	+28.7
Total formal votes		3,024	98.7	
Informal votes		41	1.3	
Turnout		3,065	92.4	
Labor hold		Swing	N/A	

=== Bunbury ===
1939 Western Australian state election: Bunbury
Party	Candidate	Votes	%	±%
Labor	Frederick Withers	2,637	53.9	−6.3
Country	Jasper Norton	1,279	26.2	+26.2
Nationalist	Vincent Donaldson	973	19.9	−19.9
Total formal votes		4,889	98.4	−0.5
Informal votes		79	1.6	+0.5
Turnout		4,968	94.2	+22.4
Labor hold		Swing	N/A	

=== Canning ===
1939 Western Australian state election: Canning
Party	Candidate	Votes	%	±%
Labor	Charles Cross	4,692	45.0	−3.6
Nationalist	Frederick Aberle	3,511	33.6	+10.5
Independent	Carlyle Ferguson	2,230	21.4	+10.7
Total formal votes		10,433	98.7	+0.5
Informal votes		140	1.3	−0.5
Turnout		10,573	92.8	+21.6
Two-party-preferred result
Labor	Charles Cross	5,529	53.0	
Nationalist	Frederick Aberle	4,904	47.0	
Labor hold		Swing	N/A	

=== Claremont ===
1939 Western Australian state election: Claremont
Party	Candidate	Votes	%	±%
Nationalist	Charles North	unopposed		
Nationalist hold		Swing		

=== Collie ===
1939 Western Australian state election: Collie
Party	Candidate	Votes	%	±%
Labor	Arthur Wilson	unopposed		
Labor hold		Swing		

=== East Perth ===
1939 Western Australian state election: East Perth
Party	Candidate	Votes	%	±%
Labor	Robert Higgins	3,011	46.2	+9.4
Independent	Thomas Hughes	2,994	45.9	−17.3
Ind. Nationalist	Herbert Wells	511	7.8	+7.8
Total formal votes		6,516	98.4	−0.7
Informal votes		108	1.6	+0.7
Turnout		6,624	86.8	+15.8
Two-candidate-preferred result
Independent	Thomas Hughes	3,408	52.3	−10.9
Labor	Robert Higgins	3,108	47.7	+10.9
Independent hold		Swing	−10.9	

=== Forrest ===
1939 Western Australian state election: Forrest
Party	Candidate	Votes	%	±%
Labor	May Holman	2,318	66.6	−33.4
Nationalist	Percy Rettallack	1,161	33.4	+33.4
Total formal votes		3,479	99.0	
Informal votes		36	1.0	
Turnout		3,515	89.0	
Labor hold		Swing	N/A	

=== Fremantle ===
1939 Western Australian state election: Fremantle
Party	Candidate	Votes	%	±%
Labor	Joseph Sleeman	5,288	68.1	−5.9
Nationalist	James Wilson	2,472	31.9	+5.9
Total formal votes		7,760	98.0	−0.7
Informal votes		158	2.0	+0.7
Turnout		7,918	95.8	+34.2
Labor hold		Swing	−5.9	

=== Gascoyne ===
1939 Western Australian state election: Gascoyne
Party	Candidate	Votes	%	±%
Labor	Frank Wise	unopposed		
Labor hold		Swing		

=== Geraldton ===
1939 Western Australian state election: Geraldton
Party	Candidate	Votes	%	±%
Labor	John Willcock	2,075	55.0	−5.6
Country	Alfred Culewis	1,389	36.8	−2.6
Nationalist	Patrick Lynch	309	8.2	+8.2
Total formal votes		3,773	99.1	−0.3
Informal votes		33	0.9	+0.3
Turnout		3,806	93.5	+13.1
Labor hold		Swing	N/A	

=== Greenough ===
1939 Western Australian state election: Greenough
Party	Candidate	Votes	%	±%
Country	William Patrick	unopposed		
Country hold		Swing		

=== Guildford-Midland ===
1939 Western Australian state election: Guildford-Midland
Party	Candidate	Votes	%	±%
Labor	William Johnson	3,797	64.9	−35.1
Independent	Joseph Batkin	2,054	35.1	+35.1
Total formal votes		5,851	98.2	
Informal votes		109	1.8	
Turnout		5,960	93.5	
Labor hold		Swing	N/A	

=== Hannans ===
1939 Western Australian state election: Hannans
Party	Candidate	Votes	%	±%
Labor	David Leahy	1,708	61.7	−38.3
Nationalist	Keith Burton	1,060	38.3	+38.3
Total formal votes		2,768	97.8	
Informal votes		61	2.2	
Turnout		2,829	94.6	
Labor hold		Swing	N/A	

=== Irwin-Moore ===
1939 Western Australian state election: Irwin-Moore
Party	Candidate	Votes	%	±%
Independent	Claude Barker	1,648	55.0	+55.0
Country	Percy Ferguson	1,349	45.0	−26.4
Total formal votes		2,997	99.0	+0.1
Informal votes		30	1.0	−0.1
Turnout		3,027	88.6	+24.0
Independent gain from Country		Swing	N/A	

=== Kalgoorlie ===
1939 Western Australian state election: Kalgoorlie
Party	Candidate	Votes	%	±%
Labor	Herbert Styants	2,676	66.0	+20.2
Nationalist	Harold Kingsbury	1,380	34.0	+34.0
Total formal votes		4,056	98.7	0.0
Informal votes		52	1.3	0.0
Turnout		4,108	92.8	+35.2
Labor hold		Swing	N/A	

=== Kanowna ===
1939 Western Australian state election: Kanowna
Party	Candidate	Votes	%	±%
Labor	Emil Nulsen	unopposed		
Labor hold		Swing		

=== Katanning ===
1939 Western Australian state election: Katanning
Party	Candidate	Votes	%	±%
Country	Arthur Watts	3,259	69.5	+16.2
Independent	Walter Bird	1,433	30.5	+30.5
Total formal votes		4,692	98.3	−0.6
Informal votes		79	1.7	+0.6
Turnout		4,771	91.5	+17.1
Country hold		Swing	N/A	

=== Kimberley ===
1939 Western Australian state election: Kimberley
Party	Candidate	Votes	%	±%
Labor	Aubrey Coverley	unopposed		
Labor hold		Swing		

=== Leederville ===
1939 Western Australian state election: Leederville
Party	Candidate	Votes	%	±%
Labor	Alexander Panton	4,694	51.9	−16.1
Nationalist	Walter Goodlet	3,362	37.2	+37.2
Independent	James Kelly	991	10.9	+10.9
Total formal votes		9,047	98.3	+0.1
Informal votes		153	1.7	−0.1
Turnout		9,200	95.6	+13.6
Labor hold		Swing	N/A	

=== Maylands ===
1939 Western Australian state election: Maylands
Party	Candidate	Votes	%	±%
Ind. Nationalist	Harry Shearn	4,966	64.2	+35.2
Labor	Robert Hartley	2,764	35.8	−3.6
Total formal votes		7,730	98.6	−0.5
Informal votes		112	1.4	+0.5
Turnout		7,842	91.7	+17.6
Ind. Nationalist hold		Swing	+8.1	

=== Middle Swan ===
1939 Western Australian state election: Middle Swan
Party	Candidate	Votes	%	±%
Labor	James Hegney	4,311	52.0	−6.8
Nationalist	Karl Drake-Brockman	3,979	48.0	+6.8
Total formal votes		8,290	97.4	−1.3
Informal votes		220	2.6	+1.3
Turnout		8,510	88.6	+26.2
Labor hold		Swing	−6.8	

=== Mount Hawthorn ===
1939 Western Australian state election: Mount Hawthorn
Party	Candidate	Votes	%	±%
Labor	Harry Millington	5,100	58.6	+4.6
Nationalist	Guildford Clarke	3,607	41.4	−4.6
Total formal votes		8,707	97.9	−1.2
Informal votes		182	2.1	+1.2
Turnout		8,889	93.6	+20.7
Labor hold		Swing	+4.6	

=== Mount Magnet ===
1939 Western Australian state election: Mount Magnet
Party	Candidate	Votes	%	±%
Labor	Lucien Triat	1,548	55.0	−45.0
Country	Peter Cassey	839	29.8	+29.8
Independent	Arthur Cooper	429	15.2	+15.2
Total formal votes		2,816	97.3	
Informal votes		79	2.7	
Turnout		2,895	81.7	
Labor hold		Swing	N/A	

=== Mount Marshall ===
1939 Western Australian state election: Mount Marshall
Party	Candidate	Votes	%	±%
Country	Frederick Warner	1,919	54.4	−19.2
Independent Country	Len Hamilton	1,608	45.6	+45.6
Total formal votes		3,527	98.6	−0.8
Informal votes		50	1.4	+0.8
Turnout		3,577	90.3	+28.1
Country hold		Swing	N/A	

=== Murchison ===
1939 Western Australian state election: Murchison
Party	Candidate	Votes	%	±%
Labor	William Marshall	2,959	81.9	−18.1
Independent Labor	John Montgomery	655	18.1	+18.1
Total formal votes		3,614	97.3	
Informal votes		99	2.7	
Turnout		3,713	76.8	
Labor hold		Swing	N/A	

=== Murray-Wellington ===
1939 Western Australian state election: Murray-Wellington
Party	Candidate	Votes	%	±%
Nationalist	Ross McLarty	unopposed		
Nationalist hold		Swing		

=== Nedlands ===
1939 Western Australian state election: Nedlands
Party	Candidate	Votes	%	±%
Nationalist	Norbert Keenan	5,102	48.0	−11.1
Labor	Dorothy Tangney	3,267	30.7	−10.2
Ind. Nationalist	Albert Crooks	2,262	21.3	+21.3
Total formal votes		10,631	98.2	−1.2
Informal votes		198	1.8	+1.2
Turnout		10,829	92.8	+24.0
Two-party-preferred result
Nationalist	Norbert Keenan	7,025	66.1	+7.0
Labor	Dorothy Tangney	3,606	33.9	−7.0
Nationalist hold		Swing	+7.0	

=== Nelson ===
1939 Western Australian state election: Nelson
Party	Candidate	Votes	%	±%
Labor	Roy Pearce	1,527	29.2	+5.0
Nationalist	John Smith	1,278	24.5	−13.1
Independent	Clarence Doust	1,119	21.4	−16.8
Country	William Scott	822	15.7	+15.7
Ind. Nationalist	Guy Thomson	479	9.2	+9.2
Total formal votes		5,225	97.6	−1.4
Informal votes		128	2.4	+1.4
Turnout		5,353	92.4	+14.4
Two-party-preferred result
Nationalist	John Smith	2,737	52.4	+9.5
Labor	Roy Pearce	2,488	47.6	+47.6
Nationalist gain from Independent		Swing	N/A	

=== North Perth ===
1939 Western Australian state election: North Perth
Party	Candidate	Votes	%	±%
Ind. Nationalist	Arthur Abbott	2,493	43.4	+43.4
Labor	Edward Holman	1,879	32.7	+2.0
Nationalist	James MacCallum Smith	1,368	23.8	−8.9
Total formal votes		5,740	98.6	−0.4
Informal votes		79	1.4	+0.4
Turnout		5,819	91.1	+15.3
Two-candidate-preferred result
Ind. Nationalist	Arthur Abbott	3,593	62.6	+62.6
Labor	Edward Holman	2,147	37.4	−4.2
Ind. Nationalist gain from Nationalist		Swing	N/A	

=== North-East Fremantle ===
1939 Western Australian state election: North-East Fremantle
Party	Candidate	Votes	%	±%
Labor	John Tonkin	3,764	55.6	+2.8
Nationalist	George James	3,006	44.4	−2.8
Total formal votes		6,770	98.5	−0.4
Informal votes		105	1.5	+0.4
Turnout		6,875	96.3	+19.9
Labor hold		Swing	+2.8	

=== Northam ===
1939 Western Australian state election: Northam
Party	Candidate	Votes	%	±%
Labor	Albert Hawke	2,670	62.8	−1.5
Nationalist	John Safe	1,579	37.2	+1.5
Total formal votes		4,249	98.8	−0.4
Informal votes		53	1.2	+0.4
Turnout		4,302	93.6	+7.8
Labor hold		Swing	−1.5	

=== Perth ===
1939 Western Australian state election: Perth
Party	Candidate	Votes	%	±%
Labor	Ted Needham	3,402	49.2	−4.7
Nationalist	Donald Cleland	2,078	30.0	+30.0
Nationalist	Harry Mann	1,435	20.7	−9.1
Total formal votes		6,915	98.2	+0.1
Informal votes		127	1.8	−0.1
Turnout		7,042	83.7	+15.4
Two-party-preferred result
Labor	Ted Needham	3,654	52.8	
Nationalist	Donald Cleland	3,261	47.2	
Labor hold		Swing	N/A	

=== Pilbara ===
1939 Western Australian state election: Pilbara
Party	Candidate	Votes	%	±%
Labor	Bill Hegney	431	52.6	+12.0
Nationalist	Frank Welsh	388	47.4	−12.0
Total formal votes		819	99.1	−0.1
Informal votes		7	0.9	+0.1
Turnout		826	85.8	+2.0
Labor gain from Nationalist		Swing	+12.0	

=== Pingelly ===
1939 Western Australian state election: Pingelly
Party	Candidate	Votes	%	±%
Country	Harrie Seward	unopposed		
Country hold		Swing		

=== Roebourne ===
1939 Western Australian state election: Roebourne
Party	Candidate	Votes	%	±%
Labor	Alec Rodoreda	355	62.1	−37.9
Nationalist	Alexander Angelo	217	37.9	+37.9
Total formal votes		572	99.6	
Informal votes		2	0.4	
Turnout		574	84.8	
Labor hold		Swing	N/A	

=== South Fremantle ===
1939 Western Australian state election: South Fremantle
Party	Candidate	Votes	%	±%
Labor	Thomas Fox	4,425	62.4	−5.7
Nationalist	Ashbury Gartrell	2,065	29.1	+29.1
Independent	Arthur Ambrose	605	8.5	+8.5
Total formal votes		7,095	97.4	−1.5
Informal votes		189	2.6	+1.5
Turnout		7,284	95.9	+35.8
Labor hold		Swing	N/A	

=== Subiaco ===
1939 Western Australian state election: Subiaco
Party	Candidate	Votes	%	±%
Nationalist	Florence Cardell-Oliver	2,963	40.2	+16.3
Labor	William Lonnie	2,714	36.9	−1.6
Ind. Nationalist	Walter Richardson	1,686	22.9	−0.2
Total formal votes		7,363	98.9	−0.3
Informal votes		80	1.1	+0.3
Turnout		7,443	95.1	+14.5
Two-party-preferred result
Nationalist	Florence Cardell-Oliver	4,272	58.0	+2.2
Labor	William Lonnie	3,091	42.0	−2.2
Nationalist hold		Swing	+2.2	

=== Sussex ===
1939 Western Australian state election: Sussex
Party	Candidate	Votes	%	±%
Nationalist	William Willmott	1,445	41.6	−28.5
Labor	Albert Morgan	994	28.5	+28.5
Country	Robert Falkingham	689	19.7	+19.7
Independent Country	William Morris	355	10.2	+10.2
Total formal votes		3,493	98.6	−0.1
Informal votes		50	1.4	+0.1
Turnout		3,543	95.6	+11.2
Two-party-preferred result
Nationalist	William Willmott	2,189	62.7	
Labor	Albert Morgan	1,304	37.3	
Nationalist hold		Swing	N/A	

=== Swan ===
1939 Western Australian state election: Swan
Party	Candidate	Votes	%	±%
Country	Richard Sampson	2,447	45.9	−54.1
Labor	Harold Larwood	1,676	31.5	+31.5
Ind. Nationalist	George North	1,206	22.6	+22.6
Total formal votes		5,329	97.9	
Informal votes		115	2.1	
Turnout		5,444	89.6	
Two-party-preferred result
Country	Richard Sampson	3,306	62.0	−38.0
Labor	Harold Larwood	2,023	38.0	+38.0
Country hold		Swing	N/A	

=== Toodyay ===
1939 Western Australian state election: Toodyay
Party	Candidate	Votes	%	±%
Country	Lindsay Thorn	unopposed		
Country hold		Swing		

=== Victoria Park ===
1939 Western Australian state election: Victoria Park
Party	Candidate	Votes	%	±%
Labor	Howard Raphael	5,538	68.0	−3.8
Independent	James Milligan	2,604	32.0	+32.0
Total formal votes		8,142	98.5	−0.4
Informal votes		127	1.5	+0.4
Turnout		8,269	93.6	+20.8
Labor hold		Swing	N/A	

=== Wagin ===
1939 Western Australian state election: Wagin
Party	Candidate	Votes	%	±%
Country	Sydney Stubbs	2,489	66.6	−34.4
Independent	Jack Eckersley	921	24.7	+24.7
Independent	Alfred Fisher	194	5.2	+5.2
Independent Country	Eugene Smalpage	132	3.5	+3.5
Total formal votes		3,736	98.6	
Informal votes		52	1.4	
Turnout		3,788	91.0	
Country hold		Swing	N/A	

=== West Perth ===
1939 Western Australian state election: West Perth
Party	Candidate	Votes	%	±%
Nationalist	Robert McDonald	3,691	62.8	+7.8
Labor	Roy Nevile	2,183	37.2	−7.8
Total formal votes		5,874	97.9	−1.2
Informal votes		126	2.1	+1.2
Turnout		6,000	89.4	+20.0
Nationalist hold		Swing	+7.8	

=== Williams-Narrogin ===
1939 Western Australian state election: Williams-Narrogin
Party	Candidate	Votes	%	±%
Country	Victor Doney	2,009	70.2	−29.8
Labor	Harry Hyde	854	29.8	+29.8
Total formal votes		2,863	99.1	
Informal votes		25	0.9	
Turnout		2,888	89.5	
Country hold		Swing	N/A	

=== Yilgarn-Coolgardie ===
1939 Western Australian state election: Yilgarn-Coolgardie
Party	Candidate	Votes	%	±%
Labor	George Lambert	1,422	42.5	−11.5
Independent Labor	Lionel Kelly	728	21.8	+21.8
Country	Arthur Richards	648	19.4	+19.4
Independent	Daniel O'Leary	549	16.4	+16.4
Total formal votes		3,347	96.5	−2.2
Informal votes		123	3.5	+2.2
Turnout		3,470	88.5	+30.2
Two-party-preferred result
Labor	George Lambert	1,849	55.2	+1.2
Country	Arthur Richards	1,498	44.8	+44.8
Labor hold		Swing	+1.2	

=== York ===
1939 Western Australian state election: York
Party	Candidate	Votes	%	±%
Country	Charles Latham	1,717	61.5	−5.8
Independent	John Keast	1,074	38.5	+5.8
Total formal votes		2,791	99.4	+0.2
Informal votes		17	0.6	−0.2
Turnout		2,808	92.0	+14.9
Country hold		Swing	−5.8	

== See also ==
- Candidates of the 1939 Western Australian state election
- 1939 Western Australian state election
- Members of the Western Australian Legislative Assembly, 1939–1943
