= Candidates of the 1939 Western Australian state election =

The 1939 Western Australian state election was held on 18 March 1939.

== Retiring Members ==
=== Labor ===
- Frank Troy (MLA) Mount Magnet

== Legislative Assembly ==
Sitting members are shown in bold text. Successful candidates are highlighted in the relevant colour. Where there is possible confusion, an asterisk (*) is also used.

Electorate	Held by	Labor candidate	Nationalist candidate	Country candidate	Other candidates
Albany	Country	Arthur Wansbrough		**Leonard Hill**	Charles Hammond (Ind. Nationalist); James Bolitho (Ind.)
Avon	Country			**Ignatius Boyle**	John Tankard (Ind. Country)
Beverley	Country			**James Mann**	
Boulder	Labor	**Philip Collier**			Walter Coath (Ind.); Wilfred Mountjoy (Communist)
Brown Hill-Ivanhoe	Labor	**Frederick Smith**	Wesley Moore		
Bunbury	Labor	**Frederick Withers**	Vincent Donaldson	Jasper Norton	
Canning	Labor	**Charles Cross**	Frederick Aberle		Carlyle Ferguson (Ind.)
Claremont	Nationalist		**Charles North**		
Collie	Labor	**Arthur Wilson**			
East Perth	Ind. Labor	Robert Higgins			**Thomas Hughes*** (Ind. Labor); Herbert Wells (Ind. Nationalist)
Forrest	Labor	**May Holman**	Percy Rettallack		
Fremantle	Labor	**Joseph Sleeman**	James Wilson		
Gascoyne	Labor	**Frank Wise**			
Geraldton	Labor	**John Willcock**	Patrick Lynch	Alfred Culewis	
Greenough	Country			**William Patrick**	
Guildford-Midland	Labor	**William Johnson**			Joseph Batkin (Ind.)
Hannans	Labor	**David Leahy**	Keith Burton		
Irwin-Moore	Country			**Percy Ferguson**	Claude Barker (Ind.)
Kalgoorlie	Labor	**Herbert Styants**	Harold Kingsbury		
Kanowna	Labor	**Emil Nulsen**			
Katanning	Country			**Arthur Watts**	Walter Bird (Ind.)
Kimberley	Labor	**Aubrey Coverley**			
Leederville	Labor	**Alexander Panton**	Walter Goodlet		James Kelly (Ind.)
Maylands	Ind. Nationalist	Robert Hartley			**Harry Shearn** (Ind. Nationalist)
Middle Swan	Labor	**James Hegney**	Karl Drake-Brockman		
Mount Hawthorn	Labor	**Harry Millington**	Guildford Clarke		
Mount Magnet	Labor	Lucien Triat		Peter Cassey	Arthur Cooper (Ind. Labor)
Mount Marshall	Country			**Frederick Warner**	Len Hamilton (Ind. Country)
Murchison	Labor	**William Marshall**			John Montgomery (Ind. Labor)
Murray-Wellington	Nationalist		**Ross McLarty**		
Nedlands	Nationalist	Dorothy Tangney	**Norbert Keenan**		Albert Crooks (Ind. Nationalist)
Nelson	Independent	Roy Pearce	John Smith	William Scott	**Clarence Doust** (Ind.); Guy Thomson (Ind. Nationalist)
North Perth	Nationalist	Edward Holman	**James Smith**		Arthur Abbott (Ind. Nationalist)
North-East Fremantle	Labor	**John Tonkin**	George James		
Northam	Labor	**Albert Hawke**	John Safe		
Perth	Labor	**Ted Needham**	Donald Cleland; Harry Mann		
Pilbara	Nationalist	Bill Hegney	**Frank Welsh**		
Pingelly	Country			**Harrie Seward**	
Roebourne	Labor	**Alec Rodoreda**	Alexander Angelo		
South Fremantle	Labor	**Tom Fox**	Ashbury Gartrell		Arthur Ambrose (Ind.)
Subiaco	Nationalist	William Lonnie	**Florence Cardell-Oliver**		Walter Richardson (Ind. Nationalist)
Sussex	Nationalist	Albert Morgan	**William Willmott**	Robert Falkingham	William Morris (Ind. Country)
Swan	Country	Harold Larwood		**Richard Sampson**	George North (Ind. Nationalist)
Toodyay	Country			**Lindsay Thorn**	
Victoria Park	Labor	**Howard Raphael**			James Milligan (Ind.)
Wagin	Country			**Sydney Stubbs**	Jack Eckersley (Ind.); Alfred Fisher (Ind.); Eugene Smalpage (Ind. Country)
West Perth	Nationalist	Roy Nevile	**Robert McDonald**		
Williams-Narrogin	Country	Harry Hyde		**Victor Doney**	
Yilgarn-Coolgardie	Labor	**George Lambert**		Arthur Richards	Lionel Kelly (Ind. Labor); Daniel O'Leary (Ind.)
York	Country			**Charles Latham**	John Keast (Ind.)

== See also ==
- Members of the Western Australian Legislative Assembly, 1936–1939
- Members of the Western Australian Legislative Assembly, 1939–1943
- 1939 Western Australian state election
