= Members of the Western Australian Legislative Assembly, 1936–1939 =

This is a list of members of the Western Australian Legislative Assembly between the 1936 election and the 1939 election, together known as the 16th Parliament.

Name	Party	District	Years in office
Ignatius Boyle	Country	Avon	1935–1943
Edmund Brockman^{[4]}	Nationalist	Sussex	1933–1938
Florence Cardell-Oliver	Nationalist	Subiaco	1936–1956
Philip Collier	Labor	Boulder	1905–1948
Aubrey Coverley	Labor	Kimberley	1924–1953
Charles Cross	Labor	Canning	1933–1947
Victor Doney	Country	Williams-Narrogin	1928–1956
Clarence Doust	Independent	Nelson	1936–1939
Percy Ferguson	Country	Irwin-Moore	1927–1939
Thomas Fox	Labor	South Fremantle	1935–1951
Albert Hawke^{[2]}	Labor	Northam	1933–1968
James Hegney	Labor	Middle Swan	1930–1947; 1950–1968
Leonard Hill	Country	Albany	1936–1956
May Holman	Labor	Forrest	1925–1939
Thomas Hughes^{[6]}	Ind. Labor	East Perth	1922–1927; 1936–1943
William Johnson	Labor	Guildford-Midland	1901–1905; 1906–1917; 1924–1948
Norbert Keenan	Nationalist	Nedlands	1904–1911; 1930–1950
George Lambert	Labor	Yilgarn-Coolgardie	1917–1930; 1933–1941
Charles Latham	Country	York	1921–1942
David Leahy^{[6]}	Labor	Hannans	1938–1948
Robert McDonald	Nationalist	West Perth	1933–1950
Ross McLarty	Nationalist	Murray-Wellington	1930–1962
James Mann	Country	Beverley	1930–1962
William Marshall	Labor	Murchison	1921–1952
Harry Millington	Labor	Mount Hawthorn	1924–1947
Selby Munsie^{[6]}	Labor	Hannans	1911–1938
Ted Needham	Labor	Perth	1904–1905; 1933–1953
Charles North	Nationalist	Claremont	1924–1956
Emil Nulsen	Labor	Kanowna	1932–1962
Alexander Panton^{[5]}	Labor	Leederville	1924–1951
William Patrick	Country	Greenough	1930–1943
Howard Raphael	Labor	Victoria Park	1930–1944
Alec Rodoreda	Labor	Roebourne	1933–1958
Richard Sampson	Country	Swan	1921–1944
Harrie Seward	Country	Pingelly	1933–1950
Harry Shearn	Ind. Nat.	Maylands	1936–1951
Joseph Sleeman	Labor	Fremantle	1924–1959
Frederick Smith^{[3]}	Labor	Brown Hill-Ivanhoe	1932–1950
James MacCallum Smith	Nationalist	North Perth	1914–1939
Sydney Stubbs	Country	Wagin	1911–1947
Herbert Styants	Labor	Kalgoorlie	1936–1956
Lindsay Thorn	Country	Toodyay	1930–1959
John Tonkin	Labor	North-East Fremantle	1933–1977
Michael Troy	Labor	Mount Magnet	1904–1939
Frederick Warner	Country	Mount Marshall	1933–1943
Arthur Watts	Country	Katanning	1935–1962
Frank Welsh	Nationalist	Pilbara	1933–1939
John Willcock	Labor	Geraldton	1917–1947
William Willmott^{[4]}	Nationalist	Sussex	1938–1947
Arthur Wilson	Labor	Collie	1908–1947
Frank Wise	Labor	Gascoyne	1933–1951
Frederick Withers	Labor	Bunbury	1924–1947

== Notes ==
^{1} Two months into his term, the election of the Independent member for East Perth, Thomas Hughes, was declared void as he had been an undischarged bankrupt at the time of the poll. A by-election was called for 9 May 1936. Hughes, who had resolved his status in the interim, and the defeated member and former minister James Kenneally contested it, with Hughes once again securing the seat.
^{2} On 13 May 1936, Albert Hawke was appointed Minister for Employment and Labour, as a result of Kenneally's defeat in East Perth. He was therefore required to resign and contest a ministerial by-election on 22 May 1936, at which he was returned unopposed.
^{3} On 27 August 1936, Frederick Smith was appointed Minister for Justice and Railways in the new Willcock Ministry. He was therefore required to resign and contest a ministerial by-election on 4 September 1936, at which he was returned unopposed.
^{4} On 4 January 1938, the Nationalist member for Sussex, Edmund Brockman, died. Nationalist candidate William Willmott won the resulting by-election on 12 February 1938.
^{5} On 24 March 1938, Alexander Panton was appointed Minister for Health in the Willcock Ministry. He was therefore required to resign and contest a ministerial by-election on 9 April 1938, at which he was successful.
^{6} On 12 March 1938, the Labor member for Hannans, Selby Munsie, died. Labor candidate David Leahy won the resulting by-election on 5 May 1938.

== Sources ==
- Black, David; Prescott, Valerie (1997). Election statistics, Legislative Assembly of Western Australia, 1890-1996. Perth: Parliamentary History Project. ISBN 0-7309-8409-5.
- Hughes, Colin A.; Graham, B. D. (1976). Voting for the South Australian, Western Australian and Tasmanian Lower Houses, 1890-1964. Canberra: Australian National University. ISBN 0-7081-1334-6.
