= Members of the Western Australian Legislative Assembly, 1939–1943 =

This is a list of members of the Western Australian Legislative Assembly between the 1939 election and the 1943 election, together known as the 17th Parliament.

Name	Party	District	Years in office
Arthur Abbott	Ind. Nat./Nationalist	North Perth	1939–1956
Claude Barker^{[3]}	Independent	Irwin-Moore	1939
Horace Berry^{[3]}	Independent	Irwin-Moore	1939–1947
Ignatius Boyle	Country	Avon	1935–1943
Florence Cardell-Oliver	Nationalist	Subiaco	1936–1956
Philip Collier	Labor	Boulder	1905–1948
Aubrey Coverley^{[1]}	Labor	Kimberley	1924–1953
Charles Cross	Labor	Canning	1933–1947
Victor Doney	Country	Williams-Narrogin	1928–1956
Thomas Fox	Labor	South Fremantle	1935–1951
Herbert Graham^{[6]}	Labor	East Perth	1943–1973
Albert Hawke	Labor	Northam	1933–1968
William Hegney	Labor	Pilbara	1939–1968
James Hegney	Labor	Middle Swan	1930–1947; 1950–1968
Leonard Hill	Country	Albany	1936–1956
Edward Holman^{[2]}	Labor	Forrest	1939–1947
May Holman^{[2]}	Labor	Forrest	1925–1939
Thomas Hughes^{[6]}	Independent	East Perth	1922–1927; 1936–1943
William Johnson	Labor	Guildford-Midland	1901–1905; 1906–1917; 1924–1948
Norbert Keenan	Nationalist	Nedlands	1904–1911; 1930–1950
Lionel Kelly^{[4]}	Ind. Country	Yilgarn-Coolgardie	1941–1968
George Lambert^{[4]}	Labor	Yilgarn-Coolgardie	1917–1930; 1933–1941
Charles Latham^{[4]}	Country	York	1921–1942
David Leahy	Labor	Hannans	1938–1948
James Mann	Country	Beverley	1930–1962
William Marshall	Labor	Murchison	1921–1952
Robert McDonald	Nationalist	West Perth	1933–1950
Ross McLarty	Nationalist	Murray-Wellington	1930–1962
Harold Millington	Labor	Mount Hawthorn	1924–1947
Edward Needham	Labor	Perth	1904–1905; 1933–1953
Charles North	Nationalist	Claremont	1924–1956
Emil Nulsen^{[1]}	Labor	Kanowna	1932–1962
William Patrick	Country	Greenough	1930–1943
Charles Perkins^{[4]}	Country	York	1942–1962
Howard Raphael	Labor	Victoria Park	1930–1944
Aloysius Rodoreda	Labor	Roebourne	1933–1958
Richard Sampson	Country	Swan	1921–1944
Harrie Seward	Country	Pingelly	1933–1950
Harry Shearn	Ind. Nat.	Maylands	1936–1951
Joseph Sleeman	Labor	Fremantle	1924–1959
Frederick Smith	Labor	Brown Hill-Ivanhoe	1932–1950
John Henry Smith	Nationalist	Nelson	1921–1936; 1939–1943
Sydney Stubbs	Country	Wagin	1911–1947
Herbert Styants	Labor	Kalgoorlie	1936–1956
Lindsay Thorn	Country	Toodyay	1930–1959
John Tonkin	Labor	North-East Fremantle	1933–1977
Lucien Triat	Labor	Mount Magnet	1939–1950
Frederick Warner	Country	Mount Marshall	1933–1943
Arthur Watts	Country	Katanning	1935–1962
Arthur Wilson	Labor	Collie	1908–1947
John Willcock	Labor	Geraldton	1917–1947
William Willmott	Nationalist	Sussex	1938–1947
Frank Wise	Labor	Gascoyne	1933–1951
Frederick Withers	Labor	Bunbury	1924–1947

== Notes ==
^{1} On 29 March 1939, Aubrey Coverley, the member for Kimberley was appointed as Minister for the North-West in the Willcock Ministry, whilst Emil Nulsen, the member for Kanowna, was appointed Minister for Justice and Minister for Railways. Both were therefore required to resign and contest ministerial by-elections on 5 April 1939, in which both were returned unopposed.
^{2} On 20 March 1939, the Labor member for Forrest, May Holman, died after a car crash. Her brother, Edward Holman, won the resulting by-election on 20 May 1939—the third family member in a row to hold the seat, as their father, John Holman, had held it from a 1923 by-election until his death in 1925.
^{3} On 2 August 1939, the Independent member for Irwin-Moore, Claude Barker, resigned. The Independent candidate, Horace Berry, won the resulting by-election on 9 September 1939.
^{4} On 30 June 1941, the Labor member for Yilgarn-Coolgardie, George Lambert, died. Independent Country candidate Lionel Kelly won the resulting by-election on 9 August 1941.
^{5} On 7 October 1942, the Country member for York, Charles Latham, resigned after being appointed to fill a Senate vacancy. Country candidate Charles Perkins won the resulting by-election on 21 November 1942.
^{6} On 15 July 1943, the Independent member for East Perth, Thomas Hughes, resigned to contest the Federal seat of Perth at the 1943 federal election. Labor candidate Herb Graham won the resulting by-election on 14 August 1943.
