= Wise ministry =

1945 Ministry of Western Australia

The Wise Ministry was the 20th Ministry of the Government of Western Australia. It succeeded the Willcock Ministry on 3 August 1945 and was led by Labor Premier Frank Wise, who had previously been Minister for Lands and Agriculture. All of the Ministers continued from the previous Ministry, although in several cases with new or altered responsibilities. The Wise Ministry was succeeded by the McLarty–Watts Ministry on 1 April 1947 after Labor were defeated in the 1947 election.

Frank Wise was sworn in as Premier and Treasurer four days before the change of Ministry. Until 3 August, he also held the portfolios of Lands and Agriculture.

The members of the Wise Ministry were:

Office	Minister
Premier and Treasurer	Frank Wise, MLA
Minister for Works; Minister for Water Supplies; Minister for Industrial Development	Albert Hawke, MLA
Minister for Lands; Minister for Labour	Alexander Panton, MLA
Chief Secretary; Minister for Police	William Kitson, MLC
Minister for Justice; Minister for Health	Emil Nulsen, MLA
Minister for the North-West; Minister for Forests	Aubrey Coverley, MLA
Minister for Education; Minister for Agriculture; Minister for Social Services	John Tonkin, Dip.Tchg., FAIA, MLA
Minister for Mines; Minister for Railways; Minister for Transport	William Marshall, MLA
Honorary Minister	Edmund Gray, MLC

Preceded by Willcock Ministry	Wise Ministry; 1945-1947	Succeeded by McLarty–Watts Ministry
