= Second Collier ministry =

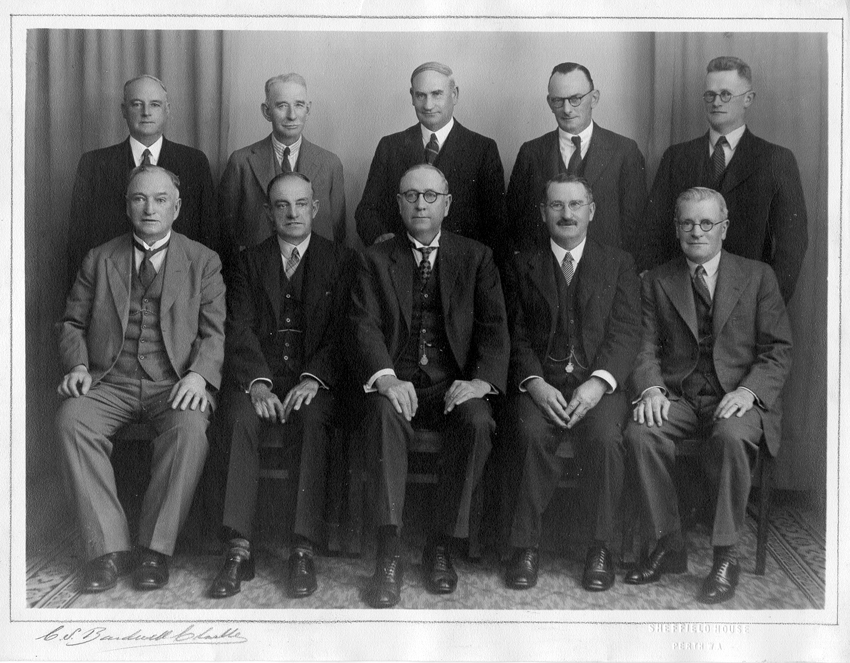
The Collier Ministry, c. 1933 Back row: Kenneally, Troy, Millington, Kitson, Wise Front row: Drew, McCallum, Collier, Willcock, Munsie

The Second Collier Ministry was the 18th Ministry of the Government of Western Australia and was led by Labor Premier Philip Collier. It succeeded the Second Mitchell Ministry on 24 April 1933, following the defeat of the Nationalist government at the 1933 election on 8 April.

The ministry was followed by the Willcock Ministry on 27 August 1936, a week after Collier resigned as Premier on the grounds of ill health and handed over to the Deputy Premier, John Willcock.

The following ministers served until the reconstitution of the ministry on 26 March 1935:

Office	Minister
Premier; Colonial Treasurer; Minister for Forests	Philip Collier, MLA
Deputy Premier; Minister for Public Works; Minister for Labour; Minister for Water Supplies	Alick McCallum, MLA (until 16 March 1935)
Minister for Justice; Minister for Railways; Minister for Education (until 26 March 1935)	John Willcock, MLA
Chief Secretary	John Drew, MLC
Minister for Mines; Minister for Health	Selby Munsie, MLA
Minister for Lands; Minister for Immigration	Michael Troy, MLA
Minister for Agriculture; Minister for Police; Minister for the North-West	Harry Millington, MLA
Minister for Employment; Industrial Development	James Kenneally, MLA
Minister without portfolio	William Kitson, MLC

On 16 March 1935, Deputy Premier Alick McCallum resigned from the Ministry and from Parliament. On 26 March, Frank Wise filled the vacancy in the Executive Council whilst a reshuffle took place amongst some of the lower-order ministers.

Office	Minister
Premier; Colonial Treasurer; Minister for Forests	Philip Collier, MLA (until 19 August 1936)^{[2]}
Deputy Premier; Minister for Justice; Minister for Railways	John Willcock, MLA^{[2]}
Chief Secretary	John Drew, MLC
Minister for Mines; Minister for Health	Selby Munsie, MLA
Minister for Lands; Minister for Immigration	Michael Troy, MLA
Minister for Public Works (from 13 May 1936); Minister for Water Supplies; Minister for Education (until 13 May 1936); Minister for Police (until 13 May 1936)	Harry Millington, MLA
Minister for Employment; Minister for Public Works; Minister for Labour	James Kenneally, MLA (until 13 May 1936)^{[1]}
Minister for Agriculture; Minister for the North-West (until 13 May 1936); Minister for Education (from 13 May 1936); Minister for Police (from 13 May 1936)	Frank Wise, MLA
Minister for Employment; Minister for Labour	Bert Hawke, MLA (from 13 May 1936)^{[2]}
Minister without portfolio	William Kitson, MLC

^{1} At the state elections on 15 February 1936, James Kenneally lost his East Perth seat to an Independent Labor candidate, Thomas Hughes. Kenneally and another candidate contested the poll citing Hughes's status as an undischarged bankrupt at the time of the poll (meaning that he was not eligible to stand), and a fresh by-election was called for 9 May, which Hughes won. On 13 May, Kenneally resigned from the Collier Ministry. Bert Hawke replaced him in the Executive Council and in two of his portfolios, whilst Millington and Wise reshuffled portfolios, in part to unite Works and Water Supplies under one minister.
^{2} Willcock assumed all of Collier's portfolios from 20 August 1936 until 27 August 1936 whilst Caucus selected a new Cabinet.

Preceded by Second Mitchell Ministry	Second Collier Ministry; 1933–1936	Succeeded by Willcock Ministry
