= Willcock ministry =

The Willcock Ministry was the 19th Ministry of the Government of Western Australia, and was led by Labor Premier John Willcock. It succeeded the Second Collier Ministry on 27 August 1936, upon the resignation of Philip Collier as Premier on ill health grounds. It became the longest-serving Labor ministry in Western Australia.

The ministry was followed by the Wise Ministry on 3 August 1945, four days after Willcock resigned as Premier and handed over to the Deputy Premier, Frank Wise.

== First Ministry ==
The following ministers served until the reconstitution of the Ministry on 21 April 1939, following the 1939 state election. Selby Munsie, in parliament since 1911, died on 12 March 1938, creating a vacancy for Alexander Panton to be brought into the ministry. At the end of the term, Frank Troy, who had spent 35 years in Parliament as the member for Mount Magnet, was appointed Agent-General for Western Australia in London. He resigned from the Ministry on 3 March 1939, but the Ministry was not reshuffled due to the impending election on 18 March, and Frank Wise adopted Troy's roles in an acting capacity.

Office	Minister
Premier; Colonial Treasurer; Minister for Forests	John Willcock, MLA
Minister for Lands; Minister for Immigration	Frank Troy, MLA
Minister for Mines; Minister for Health	Selby Munsie, MLA (until 12 March 1938)
Minister for Works; Minister for Water Supplies	Harry Millington, MLA
Minister for Agriculture; Minister for Education; Minister for Police	Frank Wise, MLA
Minister for Employment; Minister for Labour	Bert Hawke, MLA
Chief Secretary	William Kitson, MLC
Minister for Justice; Minister for Railways	Frederick Smith, MLA
Minister for Mines; Minister for Health	Alexander Panton, MLA (from 24 March 1938)
Minister without portfolio	Edmund Gray, MLC

== Second Ministry ==
On 18 April 1939, the Lieutenant-Governor, Sir James Mitchell, designated 8 principal executive offices of the Government under section 43(2) of the Constitution Acts Amendment Act 1899 and appointed the ministers to the positions. They then served until the reconstitution of the Ministry on 9 December 1943, following the 1943 state election.

Office	Minister
Premier; Colonial Treasurer; Minister for Forests	John Willcock, MLA
Minister for Works; Minister for Water Supplies; Minister for Employment	Harry Millington, MLA
Minister for Lands; Minister for Agriculture	Frank Wise, MLA
Minister for Labour; Minister for Industrial Development; Minister for Post-War Reconstruction (from 10 February 1943)	Bert Hawke, MLA
Minister for Mines; Minister for Health	Alexander Panton, MLA
Chief Secretary; Minister for Education	William Kitson, MLC
Minister for Justice; Minister for Railways	Emil Nulsen, MLA
Minister for the North-West	Aubrey Coverley, MLA
Minister without portfolio	Edmund Gray, MLC

== Third Ministry ==
On 9 December 1943, the Lieutenant-Governor, Sir James Mitchell, designated 8 principal executive offices of the Government under section 43(2) of the Constitution Acts Amendment Act 1899 and appointed the ministers to the positions. They then served until the end of the Ministry on 3 August 1945, following the resignation of John Willcock.

Office	Minister
Premier; Colonial Treasurer	John Willcock, MLA (until 31 July 1945)
Minister for Lands; Minister for Agriculture	Frank Wise, MLA
Minister for Works; Minister for Water Supplies; Minister for Industrial Development	Bert Hawke, MLA
Minister for Mines; Minister for Health	Alexander Panton, MLA
Chief Secretary; Minister for Police	William Kitson, MLC
Minister for Justice; Minister for Railways	Emil Nulsen, MLA
Minister for the North-West; Minister for Forests	Aubrey Coverley, MLA
Minister for Education; Minister for Social Services	John Tonkin, MLA
Minister without portfolio	Edmund Gray, MLC

Preceded by Second Collier Ministry	Willcock Ministry; 1936–1945	Succeeded by Wise Ministry
