= McLarty–Watts ministry =

The McLarty–Watts Ministry was the 21st Ministry of the Government of Western Australia, led by Liberal Premier Sir Ross McLarty and his deputy, Country Party leader Arthur Watts. It succeeded the Wise Ministry on 1 April 1947, following the defeat of the Labor government at the 1947 election two weeks earlier. It was significant in that it included in Florence Cardell-Oliver not only the oldest person, at age 70, to receive their first appointment to a ministerial post in Western Australia, but also the first female cabinet minister in Australia.

The ministry was followed by the Hawke Ministry on 23 February 1953 after the Coalition lost government at the state election held on 14 February.

== First Ministry ==
On 1 April 1947, the Lieutenant-Governor, Sir James Mitchell, constituted the Ministry. He designated eight principal executive offices of the Government and appointed the following ministers to their positions, who served until the reconstitution of the Ministry on 7 October 1949. Two honorary members were also appointed.

The list below is ordered by decreasing seniority within the Cabinet, as indicated by the Government Gazette and the Hansard index. Blue entries indicate members of the Liberal Party, whilst green entries indicate members of the National Country Party. The members of the Ministry were:

Office	Minister
Premier; Treasurer; Minister for Housing (until 5 January 1948); Minister for Forests (until 5 January 1948); Minister for the North-West	Ross McLarty, MM, MLA
Deputy Premier; Minister for Education; Minister for Industrial Development; Minister for Local Government	Arthur Watts, CMG, MLA
Minister for Native Affairs (until 5 January 1948:) Attorney-General Minister for Police (from 5 January 1948) Minister for Forests Minister for Housing	Robert Ross McDonald, KC, LL.B., MLA
Minister for Lands; Minister for Labour; Minister for Agriculture (until 5 January 1948)	Lindsay Thorn, MLA
Minister for Mines; Minister for Health (until 5 January 1948) (from 5 January 1948:) Chief Secretary Minister for Police	Hubert Parker, DSO, VD, MLC
Minister for Works; Minister for Water Supplies	Victor Doney, MLA
Chief Secretary (until 5 January 1948); Attorney-General (from 5 January 1948); Minister for Health (from 5 January 1948); Minister for Fisheries	Arthur Abbott, MLA
Minister for Transport; Minister for Railways	Harrie Seward, MLA
Honorary Minister for Supply and Shipping	Florence Cardell-Oliver, MLA
Honorary Minister for Agriculture (from 5 January 1948)	Garnet Barrington Wood, MLC

== First Ministry (reconstituted) ==
On 7 October 1949, the Governor, Sir James Mitchell, reconstituted the Ministry. He designated eight principal executive offices of the Government and appointed the following ministers to their positions, who served until the Ministry was reformed on 6 April 1950 after the 1950 election. As previously, two honorary ministers were appointed, with David Brand replacing Robert Ross McDonald in the Ministry.

Office	Minister
Premier; Treasurer; Minister for Forests; Minister for the North-West	Ross McLarty, MM, MLA
Deputy Premier; Minister for Education; Minister for Industrial Development; Minister for Housing	Arthur Watts, CMG, MLA
Chief Secretary; Minister for Mines; Minister for Police; Minister for Native Affairs	Hubert Parker, DSO, VD, MLC
Minister for Lands; Minister for Labour	Lindsay Thorn, MLA
Attorney-General; Minister for Fisheries; Minister for Prices	Arthur Abbott, MLA
Minister for Works; Minister for Water Supplies	Victor Doney, MLA
Minister for Supply and Shipping; Minister for Health	Florence Cardell-Oliver, MLA
Minister for Transport; Minister for Railways	Harrie Seward, MLA
Honorary Minister for Housing, Forests and Local Government	David Brand, MLA
Honorary Minister for Agriculture	Garnet Barrington Wood, MLC

== Second Ministry ==
On 6 April 1950, the Governor, Sir James Mitchell, constituted the Ministry. He designated eight principal executive offices of the Government and appointed the following ministers to their positions, who served until the end of the Ministry. On 24 October 1950, following the assent of the Acts Amendment (Increase in number of Ministers of the Crown) Act 1950 (No.2 of 1950), the Ministry was expanded to 10 members and the two Honorary Ministers were promoted. The listed Ministers served until the end of the Ministry on 23 February 1953.

Office	Minister
Premier; Treasurer (until 24 October 1950:) Minister for Forests Minister for the North-West (also from 17 January 1952)	Ross McLarty, MM, MLA
Deputy Premier; Minister for Education; Minister for Child Welfare; Minister for Industrial Development	Arthur Watts, CMG, MLA
Minister for Works; Minister for Water Supplies; Minister for Housing (until 24 October 1950)	David Brand, MLA
Minister for Lands; Minister for Labour; Minister for Immigration	Lindsay Thorn, MLA
Attorney-General; Minister for Police; Minister for Fisheries	Arthur Abbott, MLA
Chief Secretary; Minister for Local Government; Minister for Native Affairs	Victor Doney, MLA
Minister for Health; Minister for Supply and Shipping	Dame Florence Cardell-Oliver, DBE, MLA
Minister for Transport; Minister for Railways; Minister for Mines	Charles Simpson, MLC
Honorary Minister for Agriculture and North-West (until 24 October 1950); Minister for Agriculture (24 October 1950 – 17 January 1952); Minister for the North-West (24 October 1950 – 17 January 1952)	Garnet Barrington Wood, MLC (until 3 January 1952)
Honorary Minister for Housing and Mines (until 24 October 1950) (from 24 October 1950:) Minister for Housing Minister for Forests	Gerald Wild, MBE, MLA
Minister for Agriculture	Sir Charles Latham, MLC (from 17 January 1952)

Preceded by Wise Ministry	McLarty–Watts Ministry; 1947-1953	Succeeded by Hawke Ministry
