= Hubert Parker =

Australian politician

- Constituency: North-East Fremantle (1930–1933); Metropolitan-Suburban (1934–1954)

Personal details
- Born: 16 October 1883 Perth, Western Australia
- Died: 26 July 1966 (aged 82) Shenton Park, Western Australia
- Party: Nationalist, Liberal
- Spouse(s): Helen Riall, Ada Sholl
- Profession: Solicitor, notary public

Hubert Stanley Wyborn Parker DSO VD (16 October 1883—26 July 1966) was an Australian politician who represented the Western Australian Legislative Assembly seat of North-East Fremantle from 1930 until 1933, and one of the three Legislative Council seats for Metropolitan-Suburban Province (later known as Suburban Province) from 1934 until 1954. He was a member of the Nationalist Party until 1945, when the party merged into the Liberal Party. He was also a qualified solicitor and distinguished military officer who served at Gallipoli and in France during World War I.

== Biography ==
Parker was born in Perth, Western Australia. His father was Stephen Henry Parker, a barrister and member of the Legislative Council, who later became the Chief Justice of the Supreme Court of Western Australia. His mother was Amy Leake, a member of the influential Leake family which included, among others, George Leake (1856–1902), the third Premier of Western Australia. He was educated at Hale School before being sent to Malvern College in England.

In January 1900, he enlisted as a gunner in the West Australian Artillery, anticipating service in the Boer War, but was not called up. He was appointed a second lieutenant in the Australian Field Artillery on 12 May 1903, and was promoted to lieutenant on 20 September 1905. He remained on the active list but returned to civilian life. On 11 June 1906, Parker was called to the Bar and from then until 1914 practiced law in Northam and Kalgoorlie.

At the outbreak of World War I, he enlisted in the First Australian Imperial Force on 16 August 1914 as a Lieutenant, embarking for active service in the Middle East on 20 October. He was transferred to Gallipoli on 5 April 1915, where he was promoted to captain on 4 September 1915. He returned to Egypt aboard the RMS Empress of Britain, where on 30 January 1916 he transferred to the Imperial Camel Corps and ultimately to the 15th Field Artillery Brigade on 12 May 1916. He was promoted to major on 5 June, and embarked for France with the 5th Division, commanding two batteries. On 29 September 1917, he was wounded and gassed in France, and was evacuated to the UK. While there, he married Helen Riall, the daughter of Lieutenant-Colonel William Augustus Riall, on 29 December. He returned briefly to active service in January 1918 in France, and was Mentioned in Despatches. Upon the end of the war, he was removed with his wife to Adelaide aboard HMS Kashmir, and was discharged in Perth on 9 July 1919. He was awarded the Distinguished Service Order and Volunteer Decoration, as well as the 1914-15 Star, British War Medal and Victory Medal, and was entitled to the Gallipoli Medallion and plaque.

He returned to his legal practice with Parker & Parker, while continuing his part-time involvement with the Citizen Forces. In 1921 he became a Crown Prosecutor with the Crown Law Department. In November 1923, having had no children, he and his wife Helen divorced. The following month at St Columba's Church, Cottesloe, he married Ada Sholl, the daughter of Horace Sholl who had served as the member for Roebourne from 1891 to 1901. They settled in Mosman Terrace in the Perth suburb of Mosman Park, and had two sons and a daughter. On 1 October 1926 he became a Legal Staff Officer to the Australian Army Legal Department, while practicing privately with Parker & Roe (later Parker & Byass). He maintained his practice for the entire duration of his time in Parliament.

== Political life ==
In the 1927 election, Parker unsuccessfully contested the seat of Guildford.

At the 1930 election, Parker contested the Labor-held seat of North-East Fremantle for the Nationalist Party. The seat was normally a very safe Labor seat and had been held for many years by William Angwin, who had left to become Agent-General for Western Australia in London in 1927. The seat had passed at that point to Francis Rowe, who had served for 25 years as secretary to the Fremantle Wharf Labourer's Union, and had reached the age of 70 by the time of the election. Additionally, there was considerable public frustration at the Collier Government, who were viewed as having failed to deal with rising unemployment resulting from the Great Depression. Sir James Mitchell, the Nationalists' leader who had been premier from 1919 to 1924 during a period of growth, campaigned with a message of hope against the climate of mounting poverty and uncertainty. Parker's win by 13 votes was considered to be a major upset.

He served as a member of the Standing Orders Committee, and a Select Committee inquiring into the Prices of the Necessities of Life. On 22 February 1933, following the unexpected death of Thomas Davy, Parker was appointed by Premier Sir James Mitchell to the Ministry as Attorney-General and Minister for Education. He therefore resigned his seat as was the constitutional requirement at the time, but did not have to contest a ministerial by-election due to the upcoming state election. The election, held at the height of the Great Depression, was a disaster for Mitchell and the Nationalists—Parker, Mitchell and two other ministers lost their seats, and Labor's Philip Collier became premier again.

In May 1934, he contested the Metropolitan-Suburban as the endorsed Nationalist candidate, and won the seat, which he went on to hold for 20 years. He served on various Select Committees into various Acts, and as an Honorary Royal Commissioner enquiring into the Electoral Act.

On 2 January 1940, after the commencement of World War II, he was appointed General Staff Officer Grade III in the Western Command headquarters of the Citizen Forces, working with the Intelligence Section. He travelled to the Middle East with the Sea Transport division of the AIF in 1941 as a "voyage only officer", but on 16 January 1942, he was retired from military service and promoted to Honorary Lieutenant-Colonel.

With the unexpected victory of the Liberal-Country coalition under Ross McLarty, Parker was appointed to the Ministry, serving as Minister for Mines, Chief Secretary and Minister for Police in the first term of the Ministry, additionally serving brief terms in Health and Native Affairs. He became Deputy Chairman of Committees from 1951 until 1953.

== Later life ==
At the conclusion of his third full term in 1954, at age 70, he was defeated in his Suburban Province seat by Ruby Hutchison, the first woman ever elected to the Legislative Council. He continued his commitments as an active member of the Returned Services League (RSL), vice-commodore of the Mosman Bay Yacht Club, and as committee member of several exclusive clubs, namely the Western Australian Turf Club (WATC), Western Australian Cricket Association (WACA), Weld Club, and Tattersall's Club. He died at Sir Charles Gairdner Hospital on 26 July 1966 and was cremated at Karrakatta Cemetery.

Parliament of Western Australia
Preceded by Francis Rowe	Member for North-East Fremantle; 1930–1933	Succeeded by John Tonkin
Preceded by Sir Charles Nathan	Member for Metropolitan-Suburban Province; 1934–1954	Succeeded by Ruby Hutchison
Preceded by Thomas Davy	Attorney-General; 1933	Succeeded by John Willcock
Preceded by Thomas Davy	Minister for Education; 1933	Succeeded by John Willcock
Preceded by William Marshall	Minister for Mines; 1947–1950	Succeeded by Charles Simpson
Preceded by Emil Nulsen	Minister for Health; 1947–1948	Succeeded by Arthur Abbott
Preceded by Robert Ross McDonald	Minister for Police; 1948–1950	Succeeded by Arthur Abbott
Preceded by Arthur Abbott	Chief Secretary; 1948–1950	Succeeded by Victor Doney
Preceded by Robert Ross McDonald	Minister for Native Affairs; 1949–1950	Succeeded by Victor Doney
