= Edmund Gray =

Australian politician

The Honourable Edmund Gray
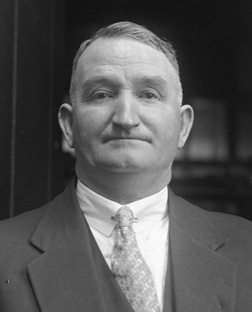

Member of the Legislative Council of Western Australia
- In office 8 September 1923 – 21 May 1952
- Preceded by: Frederick Baglin
- Succeeded by: Frederick Lavery
- Constituency: West Province

Personal details
- Born: 5 September 1878 Upper Stratton, Wiltshire, England
- Died: 9 June 1964 (aged 85) East Fremantle, Western Australia, Australia
- Party: Labor

Edmund Harry Gray (5 September 1878 – 9 June 1964) was an Australian trade unionist and politician who was a Labor Party member of the Legislative Council of Western Australia from 1923 to 1952, representing West Province. He served as a minister in the governments of John Willcock and Frank Wise.

== Early life ==
Gray was born in Upper Stratton, Wiltshire, England, to Wilmott (née Barnett) and George Gray. He left school at the age of 14, and was apprenticed to a baker and confectioner in Swindon. He was later employed in a bakery in Hull before finding work as a steward on a transatlantic ocean liner. Gray arrived in Australia in 1898, working his way over on a cargo boat and then getting a job at the smelting works in Port Pirie, South Australia. He moved the following year to Broken Hill, New South Wales, initially working in a timbermill and then opening a bakery and catering business. Gray moved again in 1910, to Western Australia, and for eight years farmed near Tambellup. He then moved to Fremantle, becoming a tally clerk on the Fremantle Wharf.

== Politics ==
Having become prominent in the labour movement in Fremantle, Gray was elected to parliament at a 1923 Legislative Council by-election for West Province, necessitated by the resignation of Frederick Baglin. He had previously served on the Claremont Road Board from 1921 to 1923, and later served on the East Fremantle Municipal Council from 1927 to 1946. Gray was re-elected to the Legislative Council on four occasions (in 1926, 1932, 1938, and 1946).

After the 1934 elections, where Gray was not a candidate, he and several other Labor officials were charged with violating Western Australia's Electoral Act 1907. They were alleged to have issued a pamphlet that contained defamatory statements about Thomas Hughes, a Nationalist candidate who unsuccessfully opposed Labor's Gilbert Fraser in West Province. Gray was convicted of the offence and fined A£20 plus costs, although he claimed he had had nothing to do with writing the pamphlet. This conviction should have automatically disqualified Gray from sitting in parliament, but the Legislative Council made no moves to expel him and the Labor government arranged for him to be pardoned by the lieutenant-governor, Sir James Mitchell.

In August 1936, when John Willcock replaced Philip Collier as premier, Gray was made a minister without portfolio in the new ministry. He retained his position in the government of Frank Wise, only leaving cabinet following the defeat of the Labor government at the 1947 state election. Gray left parliament at the 1952 Legislative Council elections, aged 74.

== Later life ==
Outside of parliament, Gray was chairman of the board of Fremantle Hospital from 1936 to 1946. He died in East Fremantle in June 1964, aged 85. He had married Fanny Munn (née Williams) in 1906, with whom he had two sons (Edmund "Ted" Gray and Sydney George Gray) and a daughter.
