= Aubrey Coverley =

Australian politician

The Honourable Aubrey Coverley
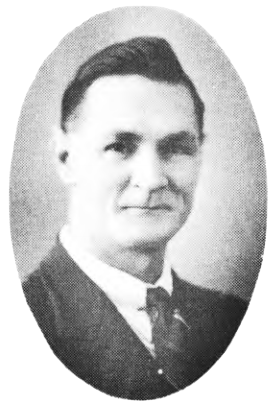

Member of the Legislative Assembly of Western Australia
- In office 5 April 1924 – 19 March 1953
- Preceded by: Michael Durack
- Succeeded by: John Rhatigan
- Constituency: Kimberley

Personal details
- Born: 29 September 1895 Bridgetown, Western Australia, Australia
- Died: 19 March 1953 (aged 57) North Perth, Western Australia, Australia
- Party: Labor

Aubrey Augustus Michael Coverley (29 September 1895 – 19 March 1953) was an Australian politician who was a Labor Party member of the Legislative Assembly of Western Australia from 1924 until his death, representing the seat of Kimberley. He served as a minister in the governments of John Willcock and Frank Wise.

== Early life ==
Coverley was born in Bridgetown, a small town in Western Australia's South West region. He enlisted in the Australian Army in 1915, serving with the 10th Light Horse in the Middle Eastern theatre. He was wounded in April 1917 and discharged from service later in the year. Coverley initially returned to Bridgetown after being repatriated, employed as a post office clerk but in 1919 transferred to Broome, in the North West. He moved to Wyndham the following year, working at the town meatworks.

== Politics and later life ==
Having joined the Labor Party in 1910, Coverley successfully stood for parliament at the 1924 state election, winning the seat of Kimberley from the Country Party. At the 1933 election, his margin was narrowed to just 32 votes. The Court of Disputed Returns subsequently declared the result void and ordered a new election, where Coverley was elected with a more comfortable margin. He also increased his majority at the 1936 election.

After the 1939 election, Coverley was made Minister for the North-West in the Willcock ministry. He was additionally made Minister for Forests after the 1943 election, and after John Willcock's resignation in 1945 retained his titles in the new ministry formed by Frank Wise. The Labor government was defeated at the 1947 election, although Coverley retained his seat with a comfortable margin. At the following two elections, he was elected unopposed. Coverley died just over a month after the 1953 election. He had been in poor health, but his death was unexpected. The resulting by-election was won by the Labor candidate, John Rhatigan. Coverley had married Evelyn Alice Roberts in 1921, with whom he had four sons.

== See also ==
- Willcock Ministry
- Wise Ministry

Parliament of Western Australia
Preceded by Michael Durack	Member for Kimberley; 1924–1953	Succeeded by John Rhatigan
Political offices
Preceded by Frank Wise	Minister for the North-West; 1939–1947	Succeeded by Ross McLarty
Preceded by John Willcock	Minister for Forest; 1943–1947	Succeeded by Ross McLarty
