= William Kitson =

Australian politician

The Honourable William Kitson
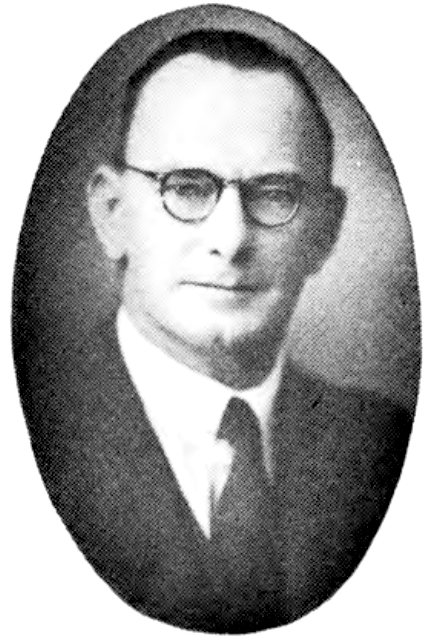

Member of the Legislative Council of Western Australia
- In office 22 May 1924 – 17 May 1947
- Preceded by: Robert Lynn
- Succeeded by: Evan Davies
- Constituency: West Province

Personal details
- Born: 20 November 1886 Leeds, Yorkshire, England
- Died: 13 December 1952 (aged 66) London, England
- Party: Labor

William Henry Kitson (20 November 1886 – 13 December 1952) was an Australian politician who was a Labor Party member of the Legislative Council of Western Australia from 1924 to 1947. He was a minister in the governments of Philip Collier, John Willcock, and Frank Wise, and later served as Agent-General for Western Australia from 1947 until his death.

== Early life ==
Kitson was born in Leeds, Yorkshire, England, to Ellen (née Lister) and James Kitson. He came to Western Australia in 1910, and initially worked as a labourer at Torbay, a small locality near Albany. Kitson moved to Fremantle in 1915, where he was a draper. While in Fremantle, he became involved in the union movement, eventually becoming secretary of the Fremantle Trades Hall.

== Politics ==
Kitson was elected to parliament at the 1924 Legislative Council election, succeeding Robert Lynn in West Province. In 1928, he was made a minister without portfolio in the first government of Philip Collier, a position which he held until the government's defeat at the 1930 state election. He returned to the ministry when Labor was re-elected at the 1933 election. Collier resigned as premier in 1936, and Kitson was made Chief Secretary in the new ministry formed by John Willcock.

Following a ministerial reshuffle in March 1937, Kitson was also made Minister for Police, replacing Frank Wise. In another reshuffle after the 1939 election, he was made Minister for Education, while the position of Minister for Police was abolished and its responsibilities subsumed into those of the Chief Secretary. Kitson was replaced as education minister after the 1943 election, although the position of Minister for Police was recreated. He remained a minister until the Labor government's defeat at the 1947 election.

== Later life ==
In July 1946, Kitson was named to succeed Frank Troy as Agent-General for Western Australia, representing the state government in London. He did not take up the position until May 1947, when his resignation from parliament was formalised. Kitson died in London in December 1952, aged 66. He had married Mabel Alport in 1915, with whom he had four children.

Parliament of Western Australia
Political offices
Preceded by John Drew	Chief Secretary; 1936–1947	Succeeded by Arthur Abbott
Preceded by Frank Wise	Minister for Police; 1937–1939; 1943–1947	Succeeded by Ross McDonald
Preceded by Frank Wise	Minister for Education; 1939–1943	Succeeded by John Tonkin
