= Frederick Baglin =

Australian politician

The Honourable Frederick Baglin
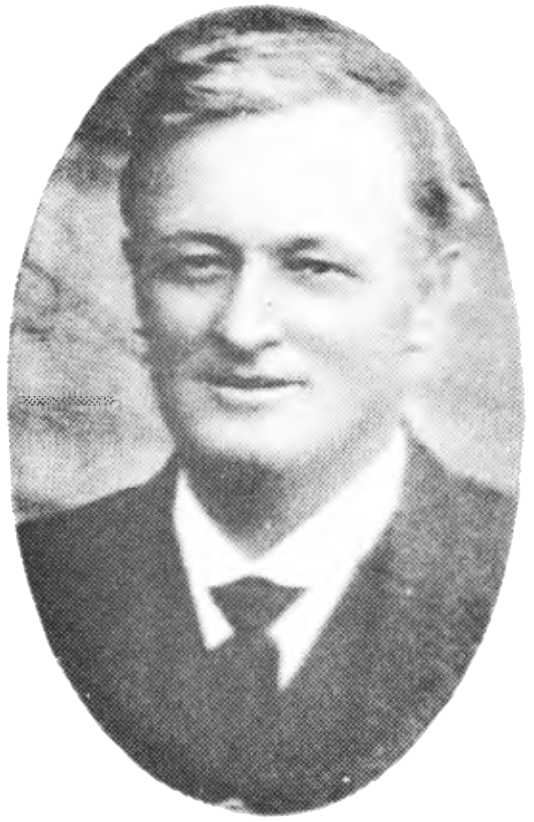

Member of the Legislative Council of Western Australia
- In office 22 May 1920 – 13 August 1923
- Preceded by: Joseph Allen
- Succeeded by: Edmund Gray
- Constituency: West Province

Personal details
- Born: Frederick Arthur Baglin; 18 May 1872 Moutajup, Victoria, Australia
- Died: 23 May 1966 (aged 94) Brisbane, Queensland, Australia
- Party: Labor

Frederick Arthur Baglin (18 May 1872 – 23 May 1966) was an Australian politician who was a Labor Party member of the Legislative Council of Western Australia from 1920 to 1923, representing West Province. He resigned his seat after being charged with theft, and subsequently served time in prison.

== Early life ==
Baglin was born in Moutajup, Victoria (near Hamilton), to Caroline (née Walter) and Samuel Baglin. He is first recorded as living in Western Australia, where he married Jean Scott in 1900, when he was a resident of Paddington (on the Eastern Goldfields) and worked as a Western Australian Government Railways contractor. Baglin later worked for periods farming near Southern Cross and as a butcher in Kalgoorlie (where his eldest daughter (Dorothy Jean) was born). He was elected to the Kalgoorlie Roads Board in 1912, but was unable to take his place due to a technicality. In 1915, Baglin moved to Fremantle, where was elected secretary of the local trades hall two years later.

== Politics ==
In 1916, Baglin was preselected as the Labor candidate for the Legislative Council's West Province. He was defeated by only 15 votes, despite his Liberal opponent, Sir Henry Briggs, being the sitting President of the Legislative Council. At the 1918 Legislative Council election, Baglin repeated his candidacy, running against another sitting member, the Nationalist Party's Robert Lynn. He was defeated a second time, losing with 48.3 percent of the vote, but succeeded on his third attempt, defeating Joseph Allen at the 1920 election.

== Criminal charges and later life ==
In July 1923, Baglin was arrested and charged with three offences of stealing as a servant, the most serious of which was the theft of A£414.10s.6d. from the ALP Fremantle District Council (his former employer). He pled guilty the following month to that charge (with the other two similar charges being dropped), and was sentenced to three years' imprisonment with hard labour. Little is known of Baglin's activities after his release from prison, including his date of death. He is known to have been living in Queensland in 1952 (aged 80), when he was the victim of a criminal assault.
