= Minister for Transport (Western Australia) =

Minister for Transport is a position in the government of Western Australia, currently held by Rita Saffioti of the Labor Party. The position was first created in 1945, in the ministry formed by Frank Wise, and has existed in almost every government since then. The minister is responsible for the Department of Transport & Major Infrastructure.

Prior to 1974, there was a separate position called the Commissioner of Railways (1883–1902) or the Minister for Railways (1902–1974), with the holder of the position having responsibility solely for Western Australia's railways (including the Western Australian Government Railways).

From 1947 to 1959, there was also a Minister for Supply and Shipping, who had responsibility for imports into Western Australia.

== List of transport ministers ==
Titles

- 3 August 1945 – present: Minister for Transport

| Term start | Term end | Minister | Party |
|---|---|---|---|
| 3 August 1945 | 1 April 1947 | William Marshall | Labor |
| 1 April 1947 | 6 April 1950 | Harrie Seward | Country |
| 6 April 1950 | 23 February 1953 | Charles Simpson | Country |
| 23 February 1953 | 14 April 1956 | Herbert Styants | Labor |
| 14 April 1956 | 2 April 1959 | Herb Graham | Labor |
| 2 April 1959 | 7 November 1961 | Charles Perkins | Country |
| 16 November 1961 | 11 April 1962 | George Cornell | Country |
| 12 April 1962 | 16 March 1965 | James Craig | Country |
| 16 March 1965 | 17 August 1965 | Charles Court | Liberal |
| 17 August 1965 | 3 March 1971 | Ray O'Connor | Liberal |
| 3 March 1971 | 8 April 1974 | Jerry Dolan | Labor |
| 8 April 1974 | 10 March 1977 | Ray O'Connor (again) | Liberal |
| 10 March 1977 | 25 August 1978 | David Wordsworth | Liberal |
| 25 August 1978 | 25 February 1983 | Cyril Rushton | Liberal |
| 25 February 1983 | 12 May 1986 | Julian Grill | Labor |
| 12 May 1986 | 25 February 1988 | Gavan Troy | Labor |
| 25 February 1988 | 12 February 1990 | Bob Pearce | Labor |
| 19 February 1990 | 16 February 1993 | Pam Beggs | Labor |
| 16 February 1993 | 28 July 1998 | Eric Charlton | National |
| 28 July 1998 | 16 February 2001 | Murray Criddle | National |
2001–2008: no minister – responsibilities held by the Minister for Planning and Infrastructure
| 23 September 2008 | 14 December 2010 | Simon O'Brien | Liberal |
| 14 December 2010 | 17 March 2014 | Troy Buswell | Liberal |
| 17 March 2014 | 20 September 2016 | Dean Nalder | Liberal |
| 22 September 2016 | 17 March 2017 | Bill Marmion | Liberal |
| 17 March 2017 | | Rita Saffioti | Labor |

== List of railways ministers ==
Titles

- 10 July 1883 – 1 July 1902: Commissioner of Railways
- 1 July 1902 – 8 April 1974: Minister for Railways

| Term start | Term end | Minister | Party |
|---|---|---|---|
| 10 July 1883 | 16 July 1884 | James Thomas | None |
| 16 July 1884 | 11 July 1885 | Clayton Mason (acting) | None |
| 11 July 1885 | 18 December 1889 | John Arthur Wright | None |
| 29 December 1890 | 10 March 1896 | Harry Venn | Ministerial |
| 1 April 1896 | 23 August 1900 | Frederick Piesse | Ministerial |
| 10 September 1900 | 27 May 1901 | Barrington Wood | Ministerial |
| 27 May 1901 | 21 November 1901 | Joseph Holmes | Ministerial |
| 21 November 1901 | 23 December 1901 | Frank Wilson | Ministerial |
| 23 December 1901 | 1 July 1902 | Walter Kingsmill | Ministerial |
| 1 July 1902 | 28 April 1904 | Hector Rason | Ministerial |
| 10 August 1904 | 7 June 1905 | John Holman | Labor |
| 7 June 1905 | 25 August 1905 | William Johnson | Labor |
| 25 August 1905 | 17 October 1911 | Henry Gregory | Ministerial |
| 17 October 1911 | 23 November 1914 | Philip Collier | Labor |
| 23 November 1914 | 27 July 1916 | John Scaddan | Labor |
| 27 July 1916 | 28 June 1917 | James Mitchell | Liberal |
| 28 June 1917 | 27 July 1917 | John Scaddan (again) | National Labor |
| 27 July 1917 | 17 April 1919 | Charles Hudson | National Labor |
| 17 April 1919 | 17 May 1919 | Hal Colebatch | Nationalist |
| 17 May 1919 | 22 March 1924 | John Scaddan (again) | Country |
| 16 April 1924 | 23 April 1930 | John Willcock | Labor |
| 24 April 1930 | 24 April 1933 | John Scaddan (again) | Country |
| 24 April 1933 | 19 August 1936 | John Willcock (again) | Labor |
| 27 August 1936 | 29 March 1939 | Frederick Smith | Labor |
| 29 March 1939 | 3 August 1945 | Emil Nulsen | Labor |
| 3 August 1945 | 1 April 1947 | William Marshall | Labor |
| 1 April 1947 | 6 April 1950 | Harrie Seward | Country |
| 6 April 1950 | 23 February 1953 | Charles Simpson | Country |
| 23 February 1953 | 14 April 1956 | Herbert Styants | Labor |
| 20 April 1956 | 2 April 1959 | Harry Strickland | Labor |
| 2 April 1959 | 16 February 1967 | Charles Court | Liberal |
| 16 February 1967 | 3 March 1971 | Ray O'Connor | Liberal |
| 3 March 1971 | 30 September 1971 | Ron Bertram | Labor |
| 12 October 1971 | 8 April 1974 | Jerry Dolan | Labor |

== List of supply and shipping ministers ==
Titles

- 5 January 1948 – 2 April 1959: Minister for Supply and Shipping

| Term start | Term end | Minister | Party |
|---|---|---|---|
| 5 January 1948 | 23 February 1953 | Florence Cardell-Oliver | Liberal |
| 23 February 1953 | 2 April 1959 | Harry Strickland | Labor |

== See also ==
- Minister for Road Safety (Western Australia)
