= Arthur Abbott =

Australian lawyer and politician (1892–1975)

The Honourable Arthur Abbott

Attorney-General of Western Australia
- In office 5 January 1948 – 23 February 1953
- Preceded by: Ross McDonald
- Succeeded by: Emil Nulsen

Member of the Legislative Assembly of Western Australia
- In office 18 March 1939 – 25 March 1950
- Preceded by: James MacCallum Smith
- Succeeded by: Ted Needham
- Constituency: North Perth
- In office 25 March 1950 – 7 April 1956
- Preceded by: None (new creation)
- Succeeded by: Edward Oldfield
- Constituency: Mount Lawley

Personal details
- Born: 14 February 1892 Broken Hill, New South Wales, Australia
- Died: 10 October 1975 (aged 83) Perth, Western Australia
- Party: Nationalist (to 1945); Liberal (from 1945)

Arthur Valentine Rutherford Abbott (14 February 1892 – 10 October 1975) was an Australian lawyer and politician who was a member of the Legislative Assembly of Western Australia from 1939 to 1956. He was a minister in the government of Sir Ross McLarty, including as attorney-general from 1948 to 1953.

== Early life ==
Abbott was born in Broken Hill, New South Wales, but raised in Perth, where he attended Hale School. He completed his secondary education at Melbourne Grammar School, as a boarder. Abbott enlisted in the Australian Imperial Force (AIF) in May 1916, and served with the Australian Field Artillery and the Australian Flying Corps, reaching the rank of lieutenant by the war's end. In 1919, he briefly studied at the Council of Legal Education in London, completing his articles of clerkship the following year.

== Politics ==
Abbott first stood for parliament at the 1936 state election, when he unsuccessfully ran for the Nationalist Party in the seat of Mount Hawthorn. He was defeated by the sitting Labor member, Harry Millington. At the 1939 state election, Abbott won the seat of North Perth, defeating a sitting member from his own party, James MacCallum Smith. He joined the Liberal Party upon its formation in 1945, and after its victory at the 1947 election was made Chief Secretary and Minister for Fisheries in the new ministry formed by Ross McLarty.

After a ministerial reshuffle in January 1948, Abbott replaced Ross McDonald as Attorney-General and was replaced as Chief Secretary by Hubert Parker. He retained the attorney-generalship and the fisheries portfolio until the government's defeat at the 1953 election, but also held a third portfolio throughout that time, which varied – he was Minister for Health from 1948 to 1949, Minister for Prices from 1949 to 1950, and Minister for Police from 1950 to 1953. Following an electoral redistribution which made North Perth a marginal seat, Abbott had transferred to the new seat of Mount Lawley at the 1950 state election. He held Mount Lawley until being defeated by Edward Oldfield (an "Independent Liberal") at the 1956 election.

== Later life ==
After leaving parliament, Abbott returned to his law firm. he died in Perth in 1975, aged 83. He was married twice, firstly to Daphne Marmion in 1918, with whom he had a son. He was divorced in 1929, and remarried in 1934 to Olive Carlyle, with whom he had a son and a daughter. His first wife was a daughter of William Marmion, who was also a member of parliament.

Parliament of Western Australia
Preceded by James MacCallum Smith	Member for North Perth; 1939–1950	Succeeded by Ted Needham
New seat	Member for Mount Lawley; 1950–1956	Succeeded by Edward Oldfield
Political offices
Preceded by William Kitson	Chief Secretary; 1947–1948	Succeeded by Hubert Parker
New creation	Minister for Fisheries; 1947–1953	Succeeded by Lionel Kelly
Preceded by Ross McDonald	Attorney-General; 1948–1953	Succeeded by Emil Nulsen
Preceded by Hubert Parker	Minister for Health; 1948–1949	Succeeded by Florence Cardell-Oliver
New creation	Minister for Prices; 1949–1950	Abolished
Preceded by Hubert Parker	Minister for Police; 1950–1953	Succeeded by Herbert Styants
