= Emil Nulsen =

Australian politician

The Honourable Emil Nulsen

Member of the Legislative Assembly of Western Australia
- In office 25 June 1932 – 25 March 1950
- Preceded by: Thomas Walker
- Succeeded by: None (abolished)
- Constituency: Kanowna
- In office 25 March 1950 – 31 March 1962
- Preceded by: None (new creation)
- Succeeded by: None (abolished)
- Constituency: Eyre

Personal details
- Born: 9 June 1885 Burra, South Australia, Australia
- Died: 3 August 1965 (aged 80) Subiaco, Western Australia
- Party: Labor

Emil Nulsen (9 June 1885 – 3 August 1965) was an Australian politician who was a Labor Party member of the Legislative Assembly of Western Australia from 1932 to 1962. He served as a minister in the governments of John Willcock, Frank Wise, and Albert Hawke.

== Early life ==
Nulsen was born in Burra, South Australia, to Emma (née Tudor) and Clement August Nulsen (or Nielsen). His father was an immigrant from Hanover, Germany. Nulsen's family moved to Perth when he was a child, where he attended Christian Brothers' College. After leaving school, he moved to the Murchison, where he worked as a bicycle rider, horseman, and amateur boxer. He later went to the Eastern Goldfields, living at various times in Lawlers (where he was a union representative), Norseman (where he ran a grocery), and Salmon Gums (where he owned a hotel and had a 3000-acre farm). Nulsen served on the Dundas Roads Board, including as chairman from 1929 to 1931.

== Politics and later life ==
Nulsen was elected to parliament at a 1932 by-election for the seat of Kanowna, following the death of the sitting member, Thomas Walker. After the 1939 state election, he was made Minister for Justice and Minister for Railways in the Willcock government, replacing Frederick Smith. When Frank Wise succeeded John Willcock as premier in 1945, he retained the justice ministry and was also made Minister for Health, but lost the railways ministry to William Marshall. The Labor government was defeated at the 1947 state election.

At the 1950 election, Nulsen's old seat of Kanowna was abolished, and he transferred to the newly created seat of Eyre, which contained most of his old electorate. When Labor were returned to government at the 1953 election, Nulsen regained his previous portfolios, becoming Minister for Justice and Minister for Health for a second time. He remained a minister until the Hawke government was defeated at the 1959 election, and retired from parliament at the 1962 election. Nulsen died in Perth in 1965, aged 80. Nulsen, a suburb of Esperance, was named after him following his death.

== See also ==
- Members of the Western Australian Legislative Assembly

Parliament of Western Australia
Preceded by Thomas Walker	Member for Kanowna; 1932–1950	Abolished
New creation	Member for Eyre; 1950–1962	Abolished
Political offices
Preceded by Frederick Smith; Arthur Abbott	Minister for Justice; 1939–1947; 1953–1959	Succeeded by Ross McDonald; Arthur Watts
Preceded by Frederick Smith	Minister for Railways; 1939–1945	Succeeded by William Marshall
Preceded by Alexander Panton; Dame Florence Cardell-Oliver	Minister for Health; 1945–1947; 1953–1959	Succeeded by Hubert Parker; Ross Hutchinson
