= Minister for Education (Western Australia) =

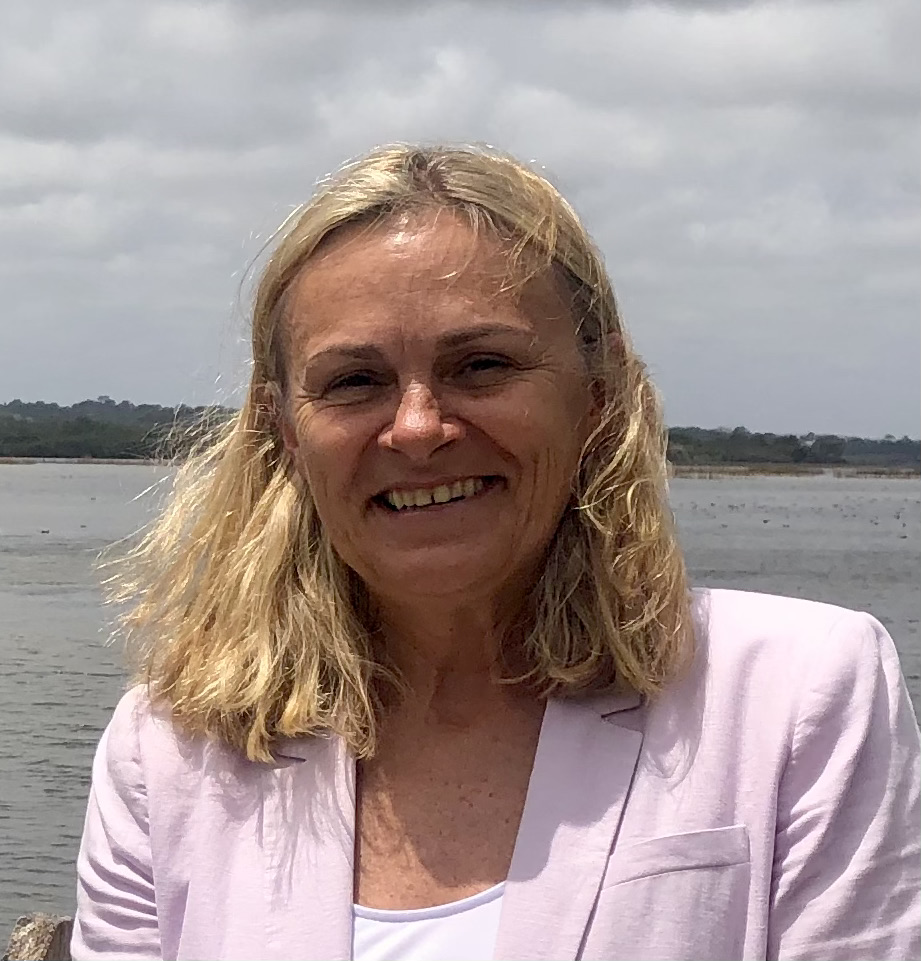
- Incumbent; Sabine Winton since 19 March 2025
- Department of Education
- Style: The Honourable
- Nominator: Premier of Western Australia
- Appointer: Governor of Western Australia
- Inaugural holder: George Shenton (as Colonial Secretary)
- Formation: 29 December 1890

The Minister for Education and Training is the member of the Government of Western Australia responsible for maintenance and improvement of Western Australia's system of education, and is answerable to the Parliament for all actions taken by the Department of Education under their authority. The holder of the office is usually an elected member of parliament from the ruling party or coalition, presently Tony Buti of the Labor Party.

Until the Daglish Ministry in 1904, when the role was separately established, the responsibility for Education generally lay with the Colonial Secretary.

== Ministers for Education ==
Minister	Party	Assumed office	Left office	Term	Title	Notes
George Shenton	(Forrest)	29 December 1890	11 October 1892	1 year, 287 days	Colonial Secretary	^{note 1}
Stephen Henry Parker	(Forrest)	11 October 1892	4 December 1894	2 years, 54 days	Colonial Secretary	
Sir John Forrest	(Forrest)	4 December 1894	19 December 1894	15 days	Colonial Secretary	
Edward Wittenoom	(Forrest)	19 December 1894	12 May 1897	2 years, 144 days	Colonial Secretary	
Henry Lefroy	(Forrest)	12 May 1897	28 April 1898	351 days	Colonial Secretary	
George Randell	(Forrest)	28 April 1898	27 May 1901	3 years, 29 days	Colonial Secretary	
Frederick Illingworth	Opposition	27 May 1901	21 November 1901	178 days	Colonial Secretary	^{note 1}
Matthew Moss	Ministerialist	21 November 1901	23 December 1901	32 days	Colonial Secretary	^{note 1}
Frederick Illingworth	Opposition	23 December 1901	1 July 1902	190 days	Colonial Secretary	^{note 1}
Walter Kingsmill	Opposition	1 July 1902	10 August 1904	2 years, 40 days	Colonial Secretary	
Henry Daglish	Labor	10 August 1904	7 June 1905	301 days		
Thomas Bath	Labor	7 June 1905	25 August 1905	79 days		
Walter Kingsmill	Ministerialist	25 August 1905	7 May 1906	255 days		
Frank Wilson	Ministerialist	7 May 1906	30 June 1909	3 years, 54 days		
John Nanson	Ministerialist	30 June 1909	7 October 1911	2 years, 99 days		
Thomas Walker	Labor	7 October 1911	27 July 1916	4 years, 294 days		
Hal Colebatch	Liberal (WA) / Nationalist	27 July 1916	17 June 1923	6 years, 331 days		
John Ewing	Nationalist	18 June 1923	15 April 1924	302 days		
John Drew	Labor	16 April 1924	24 April 1930	6 years, 8 days		
Norbert Keenan	Nationalist	24 April 1930	19 September 1931	1 year, 148 days		
Thomas Davy	Nationalist	19 September 1931	18 February 1933	1 year, 152 days		
Hubert Parker	Nationalist	24 February 1933	24 April 1933	59 days		
John Willcock	Labor	24 April 1933	26 March 1935	1 year, 336 days		
Harry Millington	Labor	26 March 1935	13 May 1936	1 year, 48 days		
Frank Wise	Labor	13 May 1936	18 April 1939	2 years, 340 days		
William Kitson	Labor	18 April 1939	9 December 1943	4 years, 235 days		
John Tonkin	Labor	9 December 1943	1 April 1947	3 years, 113 days		
Arthur Watts	Country	1 April 1947	23 February 1953	5 years, 328 days		
John Tonkin	Labor	23 February 1953	13 May 1954	1 year, 79 days		
Bill Hegney	Labor	13 May 1954	2 April 1959	4 years, 324 days		
Arthur Watts	Country	2 April 1959	1 February 1962	2 years, 305 days		
Edgar Lewis	Country	1 February 1962	3 March 1971	9 years, 30 days		
John Tonkin	Labor	3 March 1971	12 October 1971	223 days		
Tom Evans	Labor	12 October 1971	30 May 1973	1 year, 230 days		
Jerry Dolan	Labor	30 May 1973	8 April 1974	313 days		
Graham MacKinnon	Liberal	8 April 1974	10 March 1977	2 years, 336 days		
Peter Jones	National (NCP)	10 March 1977	5 March 1980	2 years, 361 days		
Bill Grayden	Liberal	5 March 1980	25 January 1982	1 year, 326 days		
Andrew Mensaros	Liberal	25 January 1982	25 February 1983	1 year, 31 days		
Bob Pearce	Labor	25 February 1983	25 February 1988	5 years, 0 days		
Carmen Lawrence	Labor	25 February 1988	12 February 1990	1 year, 352 days		
Geoff Gallop	Labor	12 February 1990	5 February 1991	358 days		
Kay Hallahan	Labor	5 February 1991	16 February 1993	2 years, 11 days		
Norman Moore	Liberal	16 February 1993	21 December 1995	2 years, 308 days		
Colin Barnett	Liberal	21 December 1995	16 February 2001	5 years, 57 days		
Alan Carpenter	Labor	16 February 2001	10 March 2005	4 years, 22 days	Minister for Education and Training	^{note 2}
Ljiljanna Ravlich	Labor	10 March 2005	13 December 2006	1 year, 278 days	Minister for Education and Training	
Mark McGowan	Labor	13 December 2006	23 September 2008	1 year, 285 days	Minister for Education and Training	
Liz Constable	Independent	23 September 2008	29 June 2012	4 years, 179 days		
Peter Collier	Liberal	29 June 2012	17 March 2017	4 years, 261 days		
Sue Ellery	Labor	17 March 2017	14 December 2022	5 years, 272 days	Minister for Education and Training	
Tony Buti	Labor	14 December 2022	19 March 2025	3 years, 342 days	Minister for Education	
Sabine Winton	Labor	19 March 2025	present		Minister for Education; Early Childhood; Preventative Health; Wheatbelt.	

== Notes ==
1. Politicians were not officially associated with organised parties until 1904.
2. The position was known as Minister for Education and Training from 14 January 2003 to 23 September 2008, when it reverted to its previous name. See "Constitution Acts Amendment Act 1899 - Reconstitution of the Gallop Ministry" (PDF). Western Australia Government Gazette. 14 January 2003. p. 2003:101.
