= Minister for Police (Western Australia) =

Position in the government of Western Australia

Minister for Police is a position in the government of Western Australia, currently held by Paul Papalia of the Labor Party. The position was first created in 1919, in the first ministry formed by James Mitchell, and has existed in almost every government since. The current minister is primarily responsible for the Western Australia Police, although past ministers held responsibilities now assigned to the Minister for Emergency Services and the Minister for Road Safety.

Between 2003 and 2008 (in the Labor governments of Geoff Gallop and Alan Carpenter) there was a separate minister titled Minister for Community Safety. Since 2008, the minister for police has also been the minister for road safety.

== List of police ministers ==
Titles

- 25 June 1919 – 5 June 1975: Minister for Police
- 5 June 1975 – 25 January 1982: Minister for Police and Traffic
- 25 January 1982 – 25 February 1983: Minister for Police
- 25 February 1983 – 19 February 1990: Minister for Police and Emergency Services
- 19 February 1990 – 1 July 2001: Minister for Police
- 1 July 2001 – 23 September 2008: Minister for Police and Emergency Services
- 23 September 2008 – present: Minister for Police

Term start	Term end	Minister	Party
25 June 1919	22 March 1924	John Scaddan	Country
16 April 1924	25 June 1928	John Willcock	Labor
25 June 1928	23 April 1930	Harold Millington	Labor
24 April 1930	24 April 1933	John Scaddan (again)	Nationalist
24 April 1933	15 July 1936	Harold Millington (again)	Labor
15 July 1936	24 March 1937	Frank Wise	Labor
24 March 1937	18 April 1939	William Kitson	Labor
1939–1943: no minister – responsibility for police held by the Chief Secretary
9 December 1943	1 April 1947	William Kitson (again)	Labor
1 April 1947	5 January 1948	Ross McDonald	Liberal
5 January 1948	6 April 1950	Hubert Parker	Liberal
6 April 1950	23 February 1953	Arthur Abbott	Liberal
23 February 1953	14 April 1956	Herbert Styants	Labor
20 April 1956	2 April 1959	John Brady	Labor
2 April 1959	7 November 1961	Charles Perkins	Country
16 November 1961	11 April 1962	George Cornell	Country
12 April 1962	3 March 1971	James Craig	Country
3 March 1971	30 May 1973	Jerry Dolan	Labor
30 May 1973	8 April 1974	Ronald Thompson	Labor
8 April 1974	10 March 1977	Ray O'Connor	Liberal
10 March 1977	5 March 1980	Des O'Neil	Liberal
5 March 1980	30 December 1982	Bill Hassell	Liberal
30 December 1982	25 February 1983	Ian Medcalf	Liberal
25 February 1983	25 February 1986	Jeff Carr	Labor
25 February 1986	12 May 1986	Arthur Tonkin	Labor
12 May 1986	25 February 1988	Gordon Hill	Labor
25 February 1988	19 February 1990	Ian Taylor	Labor
19 February 1990	16 February 1993	Graham Edwards	Labor
16 February 1993	9 January 1997	Bob Wiese	National
9 January 1997	28 July 1998	John Day	Liberal
28 July 1998	16 February 2001	Kevin Prince	Liberal
16 February 2001	25 January 2006	Michelle Roberts	Labor
3 February 2006	8 May 2006	John D'Orazio	Labor
8 May 2006	23 September 2008	John Kobelke	Labor
23 September 2008	29 June 2012	Rob Johnson	Liberal
29 June 2012	17 March 2017	Liza Harvey	Liberal
17 March 2017	19 March 2021	Michelle Roberts (again)	Labor
19 March 2021	19 March 2025	Paul Papalia	Labor
19 March 2025		Reece Whitby	Labor

== List of community safety ministers ==
Term start	Term end	Minister	Party
27 June 2003	25 January 2006	Michelle Roberts	Labor
3 February 2006	8 May 2006	John D'Orazio	Labor
8 May 2006	23 September 2008	John Kobelke	Labor

== See also ==
- Minister for Emergency Services (Western Australia)
- Minister for Road Safety (Western Australia)
