= 1939 Western Australian state election =

Australian election

- 18 March 1939

All 50 seats in the Western Australian Legislative Assembly
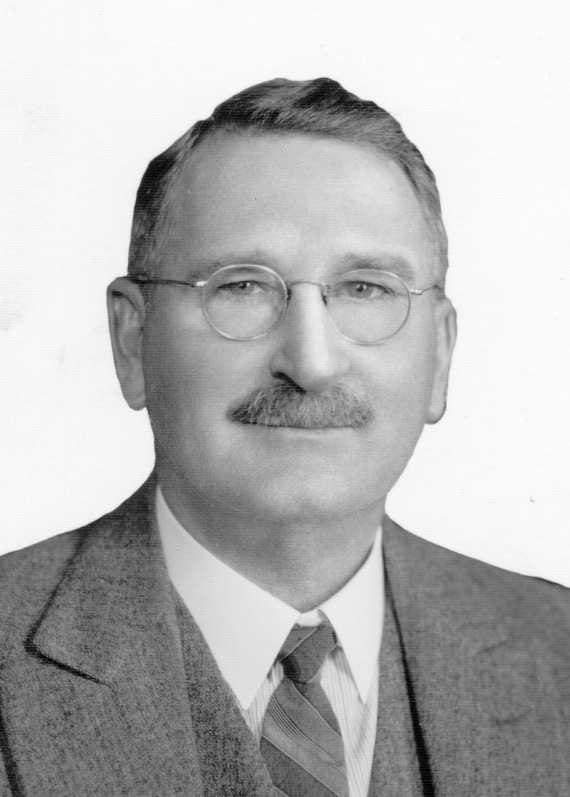

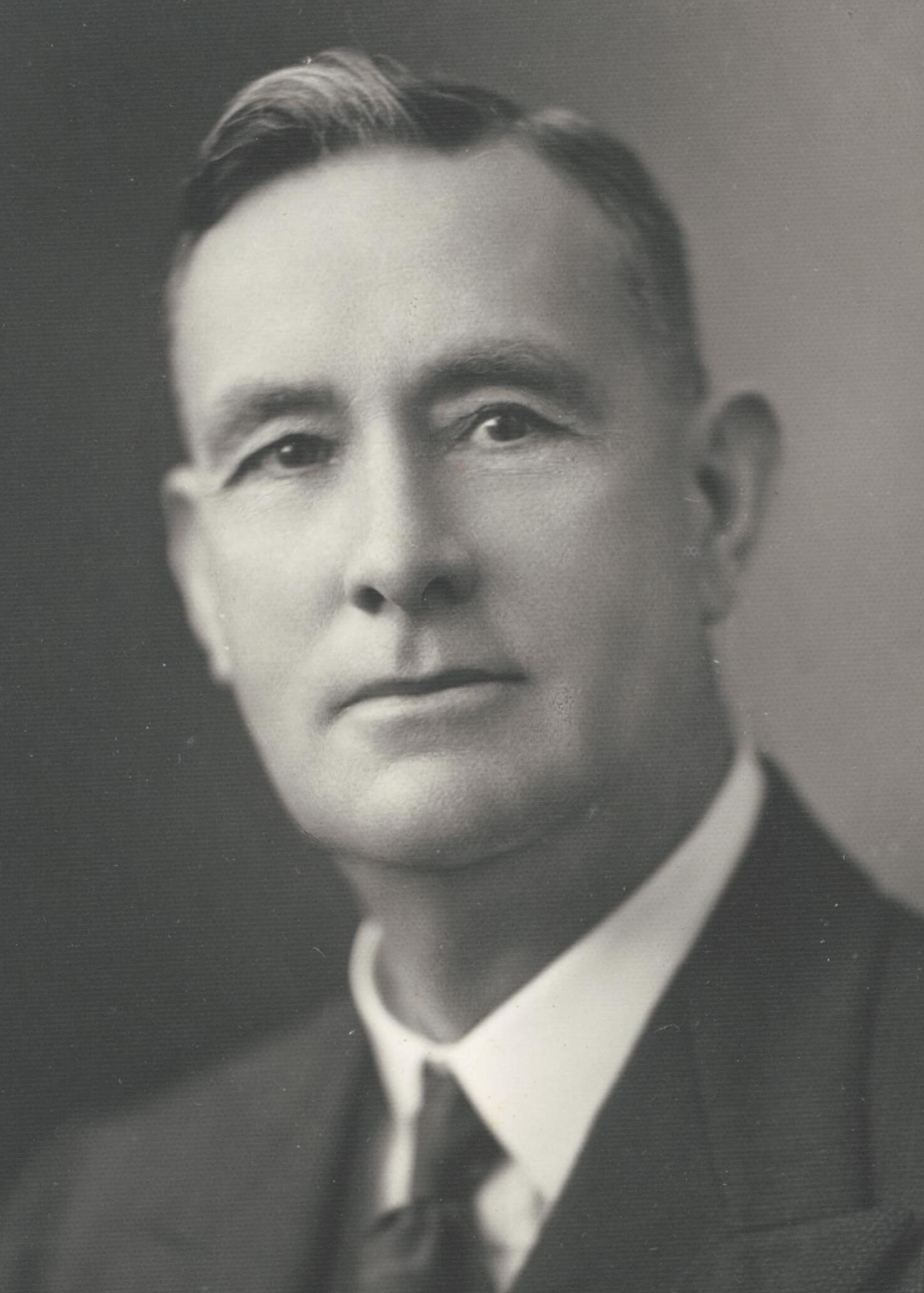
	First party	Second party	Third party
Leader	John Willcock	Charles Latham	Ross McDonald
Party	Labor	Country	Nationalist
Leader since	20 August 1936	24 April 1933	13 April 1938
Leader's seat	Geraldton	York	West Perth
Last election	26 seats	13 seats	8 seats
Seats won	27 seats	12 seats	7 seats
Seat change	▲1	▼1	▼1
Percentage	45.02%	12.00%	23.97%
Swing	▲2.63	▼2.60	▼8.39
Premier before election
John Willcock
Labor
Elected Premier
John Willcock
Labor

Elections were held in the state of Western Australia on 18 March 1939 to elect all 50 members to the Legislative Assembly. The Labor Party, led by Premier John Willcock, won a third term in office against the Country and Nationalist parties, led by Opposition Leader Charles Latham and Robert Ross McDonald respectively.

This was the first election in Western Australia since the enactment of compulsory voting, which occurred in 1936. Western Australia was one of the last states to mandate voting.

== Results ==
The election was notable for the lack of change to the status quo. Only one member—former Speaker Michael Troy, who had been in the Assembly continuously since 1904—opted to retire, being replaced in his seat of Mount Magnet by fellow Labor member Lucien Triat. Labor's Bill Hegney gained the seat of Pilbara from two-term Nationalist MLA Frank Welsh, whilst the Nationalist member since 1914 for North Perth, James MacCallum Smith, was defeated by independent Nationalist Arthur Abbott (who joined the party some years later).

Elsewhere, the only change was the exit of one Independent member—Clarence Doust in Nelson, who was defeated by his Nationalist predecessor John Henry Smith after one term—and the entry of another from Irwin-Moore, Claude Barker, replacing Country member Percy Ferguson.

Western Australian state election, 18 March 1939 Legislative Assembly << 1936–1943 >>
Enrolled voters	228,563 (Note: 265,987 electors were enrolled to vote at the election, but 10 of the 50 seats were uncontested—4 Labor seats representing 9,414 enrolled voters, 2 Nationalist seats representing 11,396 voters and 4 Country seats representing 16,614 voters.)				
Votes cast	209,331		Turnout	91.59%	+21.46%
Informal votes	3,660		Informal	1.75%	+0.63%
Summary of votes by party
Party	Primary votes	%	Swing	Seats	Change
Labor	92,585	45.02%	+2.63%	27	+ 1
Nationalist	49,307	23.97%	–8.39%	7	– 1
Country	24,681	12.00%	–2.60%	12	– 1
Ind. Nat.	13,977	6.80%	+4.26%	2	+ 1
Communist	308	0.15%	+0.06%	0	± 0
Independent	24,813	12.06%	+5.07%	2	± 0
Total	205,671			50	

== See also ==
- Candidates of the 1939 Western Australian state election
- Members of the Western Australian Legislative Assembly, 1936–1939
- Members of the Western Australian Legislative Assembly, 1939–1943

== Works cited ==
- Parliament Buildings of the Commonwealth. London: Commonwealth Parliamentary Association. 2021. ISBN 978-1-3999-0968-6.
