= Harry Millington (politician) =

Australian politician (1875–1951)

Harold Millington

Deputy Premier of Western Australia
- In office 1939 – December 1943
- Premier: John Willcock
- Preceded by: Michael Troy
- Succeeded by: Frank Wise

Member of the Western Australian Legislative Assembly
- In office 1930–1947
- Preceded by: New seat
- Succeeded by: Les Nimmo
- Constituency: Mount Hawthorn

Member of the Western Australian Legislative Assembly
- In office 1924–1930
- Preceded by: Lionel Carter
- Succeeded by: Alexander Panton
- Constituency: Leederville

Member of the Western Australian Legislative Council
- In office 1914–1920
- Constituency: North-East Province

Personal details
- Born: 24 April 1875 Gawler, South Australia, Australia
- Died: 25 October 1951 (aged 76) Subiaco, Western Australia, Australia
- Resting place: Karrakatta Cemetery
- Party: Labor
- Spouses: Ethel Lillian Clarke (m. 1902; died 1942); Mabel Grace Loane, née Baker (m. 1944)
- Children: 3 sons
- Occupation: Miner, union official

Harold Millington (24 April 1875 – 25 October 1951) was an Australian politician. He was a Labor Party member of the Parliament of Western Australia for over 25 years, serving in the Legislative Council (1914–1920) and Legislative Assembly (1924–1947). A long-serving minister in the governments of Philip Collier and John Willcock, he held a succession of portfolios including agriculture, police, education, public works, and water supplies, and served as Deputy Premier under Willcock from 1939 to 1943.

== Early life and union career ==
Millington was born in Gawler, South Australia, the son of John Francis Millington, a farmer originally from Launceston, Tasmania, and his wife Rebecca (née Goodyear). He moved to Western Australia in 1894 during the gold rush, initially working on the eastern goldfields during the rush to the Wealth of Nations mine near Coolgardie. He worked at Menzies and Yuella in 1895, and by 1900 was an underground miner on the Golden Mile at Kalgoorlie.

Millington became active in the labour movement on the goldfields. He joined the Filterpress and Cyanide Workers' Union and in 1912 became the first president of the Amalgamated Surface Workers' Union. He also served as secretary and treasurer of the Goldfields Carters and Drivers Industrial Union of Workers (1913) and vice-president of the Eastern Goldfields Labour Federation (1912). In 1914, he became full-time secretary of the Goldfields Council of the Australian Labour Federation. He married Ethel Lillian Clarke at Kalgoorlie on 15 May 1902; they had three sons.

== Parliamentary career ==
=== Legislative Council (1914–1920) ===
Millington was elected to the Legislative Council for North-East Province in a 1914 by-election. He served six years in the upper house before losing his seat in 1920. He was a delegate to the ALP's Fourth General Council in 1919, and after his defeat served as assistant secretary and then secretary of the state executive of the Labor Party from 1921 to 1924.

=== Legislative Assembly and ministry (1924–1947) ===
Millington contested and won the inner metropolitan electorate of Leederville at the 1924 election. When Philip Collier formed his first government, Millington was initially appointed minister without portfolio in April 1927, then promoted to Minister for Agriculture in December 1927, also taking on the police portfolio in 1928. He held both portfolios until the Collier government's defeat in April 1930.

His Leederville electorate was divided in a redistribution in 1930, and Millington contested and won the new seat of Mount Hawthorn. After Labor's landslide victory at the 1933 election, Millington returned to cabinet under the Second Collier Ministry, serving as Minister for Agriculture, Police, and the North-West from 1933 to 1935. In a ministerial reshuffle in 1935, he moved to the portfolios of police, education, and water supplies. Following a further reshuffle in May 1936 occasioned by the departure of James Kenneally from cabinet, Millington took on public works and water supplies, portfolios he would retain for seven years.

When Collier retired as premier on health grounds in August 1936, John Willcock succeeded him and retained Millington in the Willcock Ministry. After the 1939 election, Millington was elected deputy Labor leader and Deputy Premier, also adding the employment portfolio to his responsibilities. In December 1943, citing ill health, he resigned from the ministry and the deputy leadership. He served out his final term on the backbench before retiring at the 1947 election.

== Later life ==
After leaving parliament, Millington served as chairman of stewards of the Western Australian Trotting Association from 1947 to 1949. He was also a director of the People's Printing and Publishing Company, the publisher of the Westralian Worker.

His first wife Ethel died in 1942. On 12 January 1944, he married Mabel Grace Loane (née Baker).

Millington died at St John of God Subiaco Hospital on 25 October 1951, four days after being admitted for heart problems. He was survived by his widow, his three sons, and a stepdaughter. He was buried at Karrakatta Cemetery.

== See also ==
- Second Collier Ministry
- Willcock Ministry

Political offices
Preceded by Michael Troy	Deputy Premier of Western Australia; 1939–1943	Succeeded by Frank Wise
Western Australian Legislative Assembly
Preceded by Lionel Carter	Member for Leederville; 1924–1930	Succeeded by Alexander Panton
Preceded by New seat	Member for Mount Hawthorn; 1930–1947	Succeeded by Les Nimmo
