= Bert Hawke =

Australian politician (1900–1986)

The Honourable Bert Hawke
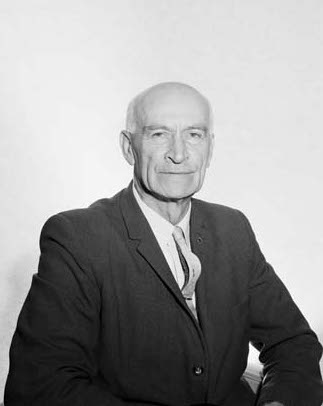

18th Premier of Western Australia
- In office 23 February 1953 – 2 April 1959
- Monarch: Elizabeth II
- Governor: Sir Charles Gairdner
- Deputy: John Tonkin
- Preceded by: Sir Ross McLarty
- Succeeded by: David Brand

Leader of the Opposition
- In office 3 July 1951 – 22 February 1953
- Premier: Ross McLarty
- Deputy: John Tonkin
- Preceded by: Frank Wise
- Succeeded by: Ross McLarty
- In office 2 April 1959 – 31 December 1966
- Premier: David Brand
- Deputy: John Tonkin
- Preceded by: David Brand
- Succeeded by: John Tonkin

Leader of the Western Australian Labor Party
- In office 3 July 1951 – 31 December 1966
- Deputy: John Tonkin
- Preceded by: Frank Wise
- Succeeded by: John Tonkin

Member of the Western Australian Legislative Assembly
- In office 24 April 1933 – 23 March 1968
- Preceded by: Sir James Mitchell
- Succeeded by: Ken McIver
- Constituency: Northam

Member of the South Australian House of Assembly
- In office 5 April 1924 – 26 March 1927
- Preceded by: George Jenkins
- Succeeded by: George Jenkins
- Constituency: Burra Burra

Personal details
- Born: Albert Redvers George Hawke; 3 December 1900 Kapunda, South Australia
- Died: 14 February 1986 (aged 85) Adelaide, South Australia
- Party: Labor
- Spouse: Mabel Crafter (m. 1923; died 1967)
- Children: 1
- Relatives: Clem Hawke (brother); Bob Hawke (nephew)

Albert Redvers George Hawke (3 December 1900 – 14 February 1986) was an Australian politician who was the premier of Western Australia from 23 February 1953 to 2 April 1959. He represented the Labor Party.

Hawke was born in South Australia, and began his political career in that state, winning a seat in the House of Assembly at the 1924 state election. He was only 23 at the time, making him the youngest MP in South Australia's history. Hawke lost his seat at the 1927 election, and moved to Western Australia the following year. At the 1933 state election in Western Australia, which saw a Labor landslide, he unexpectedly defeated the sitting Nationalist premier, Sir James Mitchell, in the seat of Northam.

In May 1936, Hawke became a minister in the government of Philip Collier. He later also served as a minister in the governments of John Willcock and Frank Wise, and was elected deputy leader of the Labor Party in July 1945. Hawke succeeded Wise as party leader in June 1951, and led Labor to victory at the 1953 state election. He retained government at the 1956 election, just a year after the 1955 party split, but was defeated in 1959 after just over six years in office. Hawke continued as Labor leader until December 1966, leading the party to two more elections, and left parliament at the 1968 election.

His nephew, Bob Hawke, served as the Prime Minister of Australia from March 1983 to December 1991.

== Early life ==
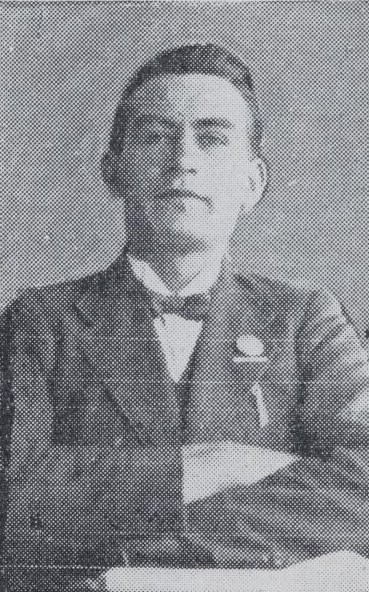
Albert Hawke c. 1923

Hawke was born to James Renfrey Hawke and Elizabeth Ann Blinman née Pascoe, both of Cornish descent, in Kapunda, South Australia. Leaving school at the age of 13, he took up an apprenticeship as a clock-maker and jeweller, before working in a lawyer's office and joining the Labor Party at 15.

== Political career ==
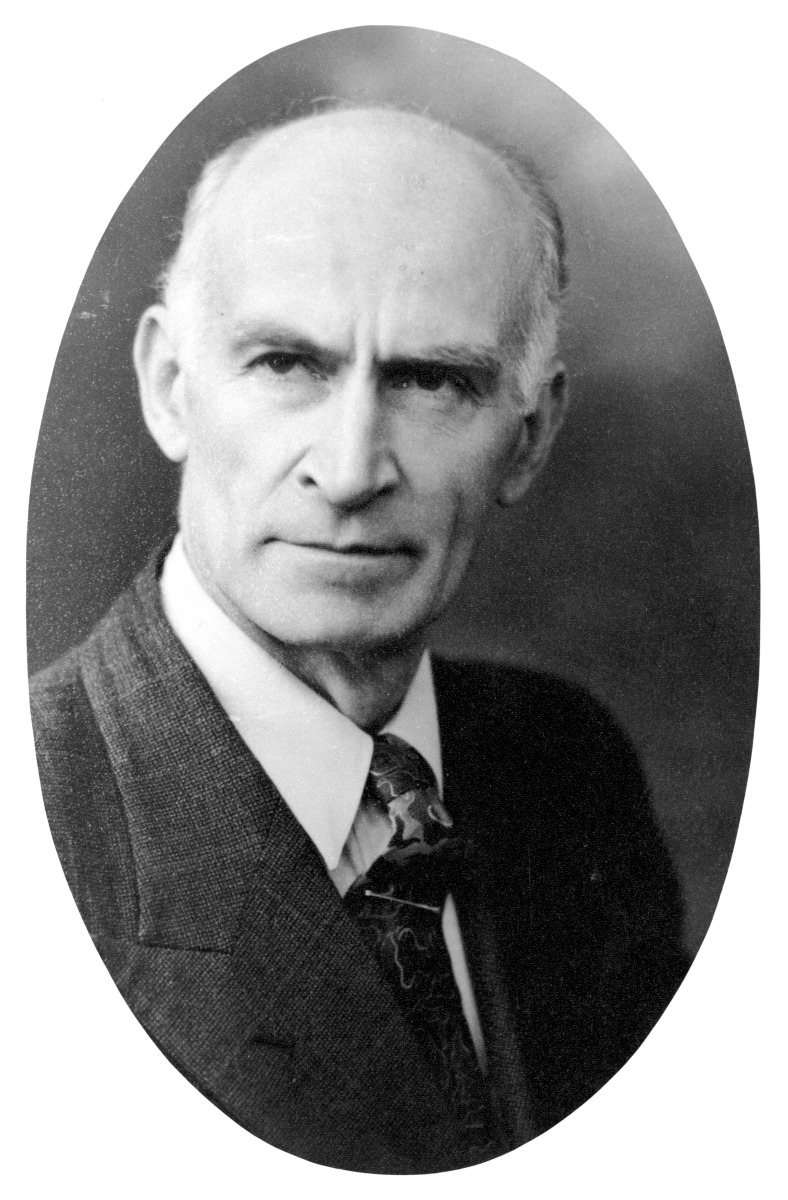
Hawke as Premier of Western Australia

At the age of 23 in the April 1924 elections he won the seat of Burra Burra in the South Australian House of Assembly, making him the youngest person to have won a seat in that parliament.

After losing the seat by just 11 votes in the following 1927 election, he moved to Western Australia in 1928, becoming a country organizer for the ALP. In 1933 he caused a major political upset by defeating the sitting Premier Sir James Mitchell by 460 votes in the Western Australian Legislative Assembly seat of Northam. Mitchell had held the seat for 28 years previously. Hawke held the seat himself for 35 years until the 1968 general elections for which he did not re-nominate.

During his Western Australian parliamentary career he was appointed Minister for Employment and Labour in 1936 in the Collier and Willcock governments. He also held the positions of Minister for Labour and Industrial Development (1939), Minister for Works, Water Supplies and Industrial Development (1943). After Labor's defeat in the 1947 elections he held various shadow portfolios before becoming Leader of the Opposition on 3 July 1951 after Frank Wise resigned.

In the 14 February 1953 elections he led Labor to victory over the two-term Liberal-Country government of Sir Ross McLarty, becoming Premier as well as Treasurer and Minister for Child Welfare and Industrial Development. In June 1953, Hawke attended the coronation of Queen Elizabeth II in London. In social policy, Hawke's governments enacted a series of progressive social reforms including the gradual easing of some oppressive regulations on Aboriginals in WA, an accelerated construction of houses and schools, increases in workers' compensation payments, allowing women to sit on juries, the regulation of hire purchase transactions, and the raising of the school-leaving age to 15.

One investigation of the Magdalene asylums (convent laundries) was undertaken - in 1953, in Western Australia. Hawke, responded to concerns of parliamentarians about the orphanages and children's homes by inviting Richard Henry Hicks, head of the NSW Department of Child Welfare, to carry out an independent investigation. His report laid most of the blame on government financial niggardliness, but criticised some odd targets, all of which persuaded Hawke to remove all three copies before anyone other than himself, a handful of colleagues and a favoured journalist had seen it.

== Later life and death ==
Labor lost the March 1959 election to David Brand's Liberals. Nevertheless, Hawke stayed on as opposition leader until a year after the 1965 election. In 1968 he retired from parliament. Thereafter he lived in South Australia again, and died in Adelaide in 1986.

== Personal life ==
In 1926, Hawke married Mabel Crafter, and they had a daughter.

Hawke's brother, Clem Hawke, a Congregational minister, was the father of Bob Hawke, Prime Minister of Australia from 1983 to 1991.

== See also ==
- Hawke ministry (Western Australia)
- Political families of Australia

South Australian House of Assembly
Preceded by George Jenkins	Member for Burra Burra; 5 April 1924 – 26 March 1927	Succeeded by George Jenkins
Western Australian Legislative Assembly
Preceded by James Mitchell	Member for Northam; 24 April 1933 – 23 March 1968	Succeeded by Ken McIver
Political offices
Preceded by James Kenneally	Minister for Employment; 13 May 1936 – 18 April 1939	Succeeded by Harry Millington
Preceded by James Kenneally	Minister for Labour; 13 May 1936 – 9 December 1943	Succeeded by Abolished
New title	Minister for Industrial Development; 18 April 1939 – 1 April 1947	Succeeded by Arthur Watts
Preceded by Harry Millington	Minister for Works; 9 December 1943 – 1 April 1947	Succeeded by Victor Doney
Preceded by Harry Millington	Minister for Water Supplies; 9 December 1943 – 1 April 1947	Succeeded by Victor Doney
Preceded by Ross McLarty	Premier of Western Australia; 23 February 1953 – 2 April 1959	Succeeded by David Brand
Preceded by Ross McLarty	Treasurer of Western Australia; 23 February 1953 – 2 April 1959	Succeeded by David Brand
Preceded by Arthur Watts	Minister for Child Welfare; 23 February 1953 – 2 April 1959	Succeeded by Les Logan
Preceded by Arthur Watts	Minister for Industrial Development; 23 February 1953 – 13 May 1954	Succeeded by Lionel Kelly
Preceded by Lionel Kelly	Minister for Industrial Development; 19 December 1957 – 13 November 1958	Succeeded by Frank Wise
Party political offices
Preceded by Frank Wise	Leader of the Western Australian Labor Party; 3 July 1951 – 31 December 1966	Succeeded by John Tonkin
