= Ross McDonald =

Australian politician (1888–1964)

The Honourable Sir Ross McDonald QC

Leader of the Liberal Party (Note: Known as the Nationalist Party until 1945.) in Western Australia
- In office 13 April 1938 – 14 December 1946
- Preceded by: Norbert Keenan
- Succeeded by: Ross McLarty

Attorney-General of Western Australia
- In office 1 April 1947 – 5 January 1948
- Preceded by: Hubert Parker
- Succeeded by: Arthur Abbott

Member of the Legislative Assembly of Western Australia
- In office 8 April 1933 – 23 March 1950
- Preceded by: Thomas Davy
- Succeeded by: Joseph Totterdell
- Constituency: West Perth

Personal details
- Born: 25 January 1888 Albany, Western Australia
- Died: 25 March 1964 (aged 76) Subiaco, Western Australia
- Party: Nationalist (to 1945); Liberal (from 1945)
- Education: University of Adelaide
- Occupation: Barrister

Sir Robert Ross McDonald QC (25 January 1888 – 25 March 1964) was an Australian politician who was a member of the Legislative Assembly of Western Australia from 1933 to 1950, representing the seat of West Perth. He served as leader of the Nationalist Party from 1938 to 1945, and of the Liberal Party (its successor) from 1945 to 1946, during the period when those parties were the junior partners in the coalition with the Country Party.

== Early life ==
McDonald was born in Albany, Western Australia, to Mary Jane (née Elder) and Angus McDonald. He boarded at Scotch College, Perth, and then studied law by correspondence at the University of Adelaide. He was called to bar in 1910. McDonald enlisted as a private in the Australian Imperial Force in 1916, and later served as a lower-level officer with various artillery units in France and Belgium. He had reached the rank of lieutenant by the end of the war. On his return to Australia in 1919, McDonald joined the law firm of Robert Thomson Robinson (a fellow Albany native), eventually becoming a partner. He was a part-time lecturer at the University of Western Australia from 1928 to 1931, and also served as the foundation vice-president of the Australian branch of the International Commission of Jurists.

== Parliamentary career ==
At the 1933 state election, McDonald stood as the Nationalist candidate for West Perth, and was elected in spite of his party's landslide defeat. (Note: The previous member, Thomas Davy, had died in office only months before the election, but no by-election was held.) The Nationalists were reduced to just eight seats of 50, becoming only the third-largest party in parliament (behind Labor and the Country Party). Norbert Keenan succeeded the former premier James Mitchell as the party's leader, but McDonald soon became one of the party's most prominent MPs, due to his debating style. When Keenan, aged 74, resigned as leader in April 1938, McDonald was elected in his place. The Nationalists had failed to gain any seats at the 1936 election, and the Country Party (under leaders of the opposition Charles Latham and Arthur Watts) would remain the senior party in the coalition throughout McDonald's period as leadership.

In 1944 and 1945, McDonald was involved in the affiliation of Western Australia's Nationalist Party to the new federal Liberal Party, and the corresponding name change. He resigned as leader of the Liberal Party in December 1946, in favour of Ross McLarty, with the belief that the party would be better served by a leader from a rural constituency.

As well as being the first WA Liberal leader he was the only WA Liberal leader who did not lead the party to an election until Matt Birney.

After the 1947 state election, which saw the return of a coalition government, McDonald was appointed Attorney-General, Minister for Police, and Minister for Native Affairs in the new McLarty–Watts ministry. After a cabinet reshuffle in January 1948, his titles became Minister for Native Affairs, Minister for Housing, and Minister for Forestry. McDonald resigned from the ministry in October 1949 and from parliament at the 1950 election.

== Later life ==
McDonald was knighted in June 1950 for his services to the state. After leaving politics, he served as a member of the senate of the University of Western Australia (from 1950 to 1961) and as chairman of Royal Perth Hospital (from 1956 to 1960). In 1961, the University of Western Australia granted McDonald an honorary doctorate of law (LL.D.). He died at St John of God Subiaco Hospital in March 1964 (aged 76), having never married.

== Notes ==
Parliament of Western Australia
Preceded by Thomas Davy	Member for West Perth; 1933–1950	Succeeded by Joseph Totterdell
Political offices
Preceded by Emil Nulsen	Attorney-General; 1947–1948	Succeeded by Arthur Abbott
Preceded by William Kitson	Minister for Police; 1947–1948	Succeeded by Hubert Parker
New creation	Minister for Native Affairs; 1947–1949	Succeeded by Hubert Parker
Preceded by Ross McLarty	Minister for Housing; 1948–1949	Succeeded by Arthur Watts
Preceded by Ross McLarty	Minister for Forests; 1948–1949	Succeeded by Ross McLarty
