= Ross McLarty =

Australian politician (1891–1962)

Sir Ross McLarty KBE, MM
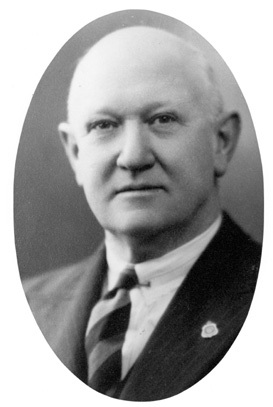

17th Premier of Western Australia
- In office 1 April 1947 – 23 February 1953
- Monarchs: George VI; Elizabeth II
- Governor: Sir James Mitchell; Sir Charles Gairdner
- Deputy: Arthur Watts
- Preceded by: Frank Wise
- Succeeded by: Albert Hawke

Member of the Western Australian Parliament for Murray-Wellington
- In office 12 April 1930 – 31 March 1962
- Preceded by: William George
- Succeeded by: Ewart Runciman

Personal details
- Born: 17 March 1891 Pinjarra, Western Australia
- Died: 22 December 1962 (aged 71) Pinjarra, Western Australia
- Party: Nationalist (1930–45); Liberal (1945–62)
- Spouse: Violet Olive Margaret Herron

Military service
- Allegiance: Australia
- Branch/service: Australian Imperial Force; Volunteer Defence Corps
- Years of service: 1916–1919; 1942–1946
- Rank: Lieutenant
- Battles/wars: First World War; Battle of Passchendaele; Second Battle of the Somme; Second World War
- Awards: Military Medal

Sir Duncan Ross McLarty, KBE, MM (17 March 1891 – 22 December 1962) was an Australian politician and the 17th Premier of Western Australia.

== Early life ==
McLarty was born in Pinjarra, Western Australia, the youngest of seven children of Edward McLarty, a farmer and grazier and member of the Western Australian Legislative Council, and his wife Mary Jane, née Campbell. He attended Pinjarra State School and the Perth Boys' High School.

On 12 January 1916 he enlisted in the Australian Imperial Force at the Blackboy Hill depot. On 27 March he was promoted to corporal and assigned to the 44th Battalion, arriving in England on 21 July. The 44th Battalion departed England for the Western Front on 25 November 1916. McLarty was promoted to sergeant on 29 March 1917. In June 1918, McLarty was awarded the Military Medal for "bravery in the field" on 25 January 1918 at Passchendaele.

McLarty was commissioned on 1 May 1918 as a second lieutenant and was promoted to lieutenant on 1 August. This was the rank he held until being discharged. On 28 August 1918, during the Second Battle of the Somme, McLarty was wounded in the left hand. While convalescing in London he had a chance meeting with his brother Douglas who was serving with the 16th Battalion.

After the war, McLarty returned to farming at Pinjarra and married Violet Olive Margaret Herron on 25 October 1922. He served as a justice of the peace from 1925 and belonged to the Returned Sailors', Soldiers' and Airmen's Imperial League of Australia.

== Parliamentary career ==
He campaigned in the 1930 state election as a Nationalist candidate with the slogan 'A practical farmer for a farming electorate', winning the lower house seat of Murray-Wellington. At the 1933 election, the Nationalists were defeated by the Labor Party under Philip Collier, beginning a 14-year period in opposition for the conservative parties. On 14 December 1946, McLarty succeeded the retired Robert Ross McDonald as leader of the newly formed Liberal Party, which had amalgamated with the Nationalists.

=== Premiership ===
The 1947 election saw the Liberal-Country coalition unexpectedly defeat the Labor government of premier Frank Wise who had held the position for only two years. For the first time since 1933, the Liberal (formerly Nationalist) group in Parliament was larger than the Country Party's and, under the negotiated coalition agreement, McLarty became premier and the Country Party's Arthur Watts became his deputy.

Together with the premiership, he held the Treasury, Housing, Forests and North-West portfolios. His administration coincided with rapid post-war expansion of the Western Australian economy and, in 1950, conducted negotiations with BP to develop the Kwinana Oil Refinery whose surrounding area subsequently developed into the state's main industrial district. His government accepted federal funding to establish the State Housing Commission. His premiership was, however, marred by discord between the two coalition parties. He was knighted in January 1953 and lost office at the election next month, continuing as opposition leader for another four years until March 1957.

Throughout his parliamentary career, McLarty travelled home to Pinjarra for most weekends. He was chairman of the Murray District Hospital Board and held a number of pastoral investments, including a controlling interest in Liveringa station, near Derby. He resigned from parliament because of poor health in May 1962 and died in December. McLarty was accorded a state funeral and is buried in the Pinjarra cemetery.

== See also ==
- McLarty–Watts Ministry

Political offices
Preceded by Frank Wise	Premier of Western Australia; 1947–1953	Succeeded by Albert Hawke
Parliament of Western Australia
Preceded by William George	Member for Murray-Wellington; 1930–1962	Succeeded by Ewart Runciman
Party political offices
Preceded by Robert Ross McDonald	Leader of the Liberal Party (WA division); 1946–1957	Succeeded by David Brand
