= Frank Wise =

Australian politician

The Honourable Frank Wise AO
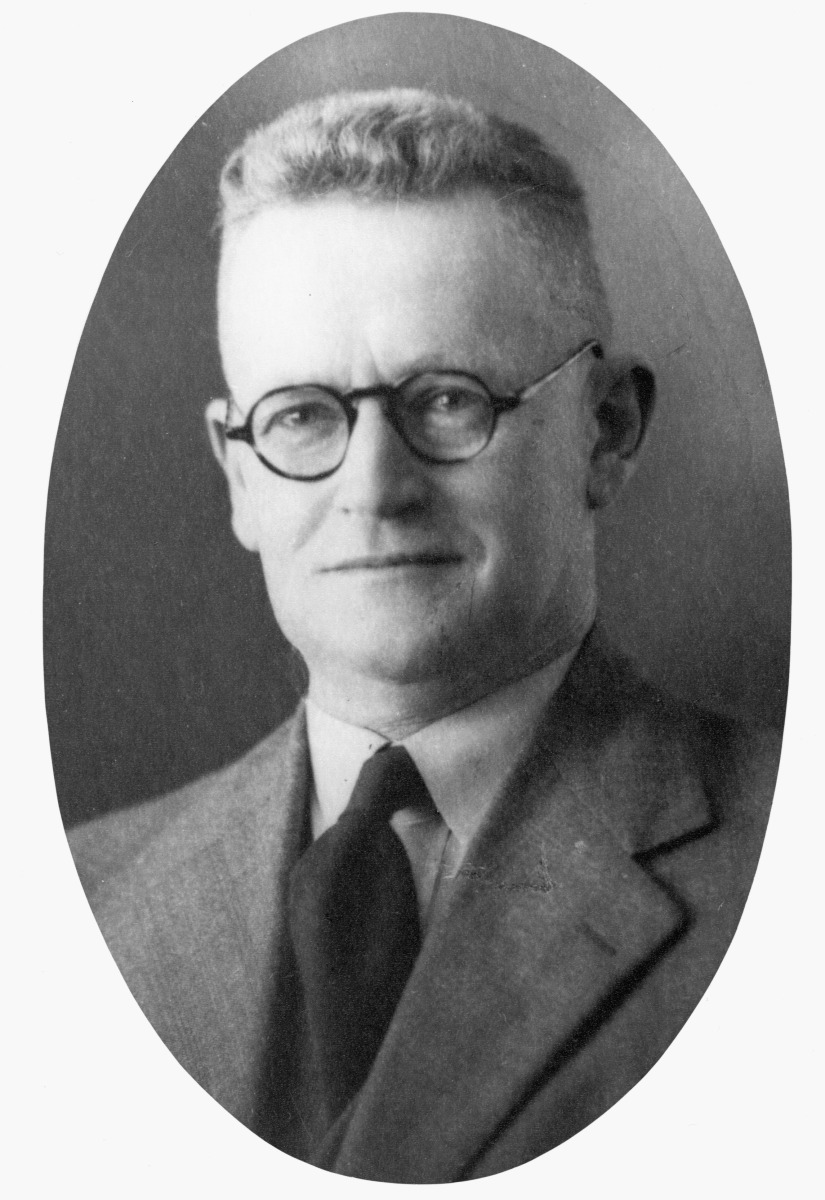

16th Premier of Western Australia
- In office 31 July 1945 – 1 April 1947
- Monarch: George VI
- Governor: Sir James Mitchell
- Preceded by: John Willcock
- Succeeded by: Ross McLarty

Administrator of the Northern Territory
- In office 1 July 1951 – 30 June 1956
- Preceded by: Arthur Driver
- Succeeded by: James Archer

Member of the Legislative Assembly of Western Australia
- In office 8 April 1933 – 9 July 1951
- Preceded by: Edward Angelo
- Succeeded by: Noel Butcher
- Constituency: Gascoyne

Member of the Legislative Council of Western Australia
- In office 22 September 1956 – 21 May 1971
- Preceded by: Don Barker
- Succeeded by: Bill Withers
- Constituency: North Province

Personal details
- Born: Frank Joseph Scott Wise; 30 May 1897 Ipswich, Queensland, Australia
- Died: 29 June 1986 (aged 89) Cottesloe, Western Australia, Australia
- Party: Labor

Frank Joseph Scott Wise AO (30 May 1897 – 29 June 1986) was a Labor Party politician who was the 16th Premier of Western Australia. He took office on 31 July 1945 in the closing stages of the Second World War, following the resignation of his predecessor due to ill health. He lost the following election two years later to the Liberal Party after Labor had held office for fourteen years previously.

== Early life ==
Wise was born on 30 May 1897 in Ipswich, Queensland. He was the son of Emily Gertrude (née Gordon) and Charles Edward Wise, his parents having immigrated from England.

Wise was raised in Brisbane, attending state schools at Rosalie, Mount Gravatt and East Brisbane. He went on to attend the Queensland Agricultural College, leaving in 1913 to work on the family farm. In 1917 he joined the Queensland Department of Agriculture, working as a farmhand and field officer at the state farms at Roma, Kairi and Home Hill.

In 1923, Wise was seconded to the Western Australian Department of Agriculture to conduct research on cotton-growing in the West Kimberley. He returned to Queensland in 1924 and farmed at Gympie until 1928, when he was appointed as a special commissioner to the North Australia Commission and delivered a report on tropical agriculture in North Australia. Wise returned to Western Australia in 1929 as an adviser to the agriculture department and settled in Carnarvon. He was "largely responsible for the establishment of the irrigated banana-growing industry in the Carnarvon region".

== Politics ==
Wise joined the Australian Labor Party (ALP) in 1920 while living in Queensland. He was an unsuccessfully candidate for the Western Australian Legislative Council in 1930, standing in the North Province.

Wise was elected to the Western Australian Legislative Assembly at the 1933 state election. He defeated the incumbent MP Edward Angelo. He was elevated to state cabinet in 1935, holding various portfolios.

== Premier, 1945–1947 ==
For reasons of ill health, John Willcock resigned his premiership on 31 July 1945 and Wise was elected into the position. Wise held the position for only two years until the 1947 election when his party lost to the Liberals headed by Sir Ross McLarty.

== Later career ==
He was Leader of the Opposition for the next four years before taking up the position of Administrator of the Northern Territory and President of the Northern Territory Legislative Council (now replaced with the unicameral Northern Territory Legislative Assembly).

== Honours ==
In 1942, botanist Charles Gardner named the Australian shrub Acacia wiseana in his honour.

In the 1979 Australia Day honours list, he was appointed an Officer of the Order of Australia for his services to politics.

Parliament of Western Australia
| Preceded by Edward Angelo | MLA for Gascoyne; 1933–1951 | Succeeded by Noel Butcher |
| Preceded by Don Barker | MLC for North Province; 1956–1971 | Succeeded by Bill Withers |
Political offices
| Preceded by John Willcock | Premier; 1945–1947 | Succeeded by Ross McLarty |
| Preceded by John Willcock | Treasurer; 1945–1947 | Succeeded by Ross McLarty |
| Preceded by Harold Millington | Minister for Agriculture; 1935–1945 | Succeeded by John Tonkin |
| Preceded by Harold Millington | Minister for the North-West; 1935–1936 | Abolished |
| Preceded by Harold Millington | Minister for Police; 1936–1937 | Succeeded by William Kitson |
| Preceded by Harold Millington | Minister for Education; 1936–1939 | Succeeded by William Kitson |
| Preceded by Frank Troy | Minister for Lands; 1939–1945 | Succeeded by Alexander Panton |
| Preceded by Albert Hawke | Minister for Industrial Development; 1958–1959 | Succeeded by Charles Court |
| Preceded by Gilbert Fraser | Minister for Local Government; 1958–1959 | Succeeded by Les Logan |
| Preceded by Gilbert Fraser | Minister for Town Planning; 1958–1959 | Succeeded by Les Logan |

Government offices
| Preceded by Arthur Driver | Administrator of the Northern Territory; 1951–1956 | Succeeded by James Archer |
