= John Willcock =

Australian politician

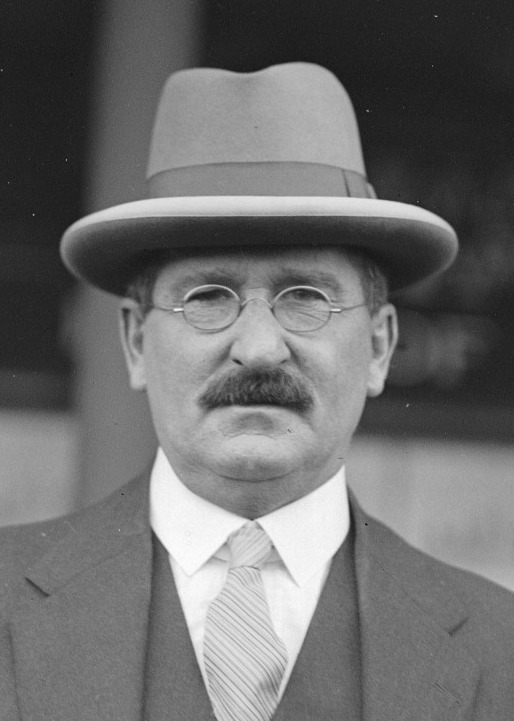
- Willcock in 1928

15th Premier of Western Australia
- In office 20 August 1936 – 31 July 1945
- Monarchs: Edward VIII; George VI
- Governor: James Mitchell (acting)
- Preceded by: Philip Collier
- Succeeded by: Frank Wise

Member of the Western Australian Legislative Assembly
- In office 29 September 1916 – 15 March 1947
- Preceded by: Samuel Elliott
- Succeeded by: Edmund Hall
- Constituency: Geraldton

Personal details
- Born: 9 August 1879 Frogmore, New South Wales
- Died: 7 July 1956 (aged 76) Subiaco, Western Australia
- Party: Labor
- Spouse: Sicily Ann Stone (m. 1907)
- Profession: Train driver

John Collings Willcock (9 August 1879 – 7 June 1956) was an Australian politician. He was the premier of Western Australia from 1936 to 1945, holding office as state leader of the Australian Labor Party (ALP). He was a member of the Western Australian Legislative Assembly from 1916 to 1947, representing the seat of Geraldton. Prior to entering politics he was a railways worker and train driver.

== Early life ==
Willcock was born on 9 August 1879 in Frogmore, New South Wales. He was the sixth child born to Ellen (née Webb) and Joseph Willcock. His parents were both born in England and his father worked as a miner after moving to Australia.

Willcock attended Sydney Boys High School. After leaving school he worked in a bakery for a period then moved to Western Australia in 1897 where he worked on the expansion of Fremantle Harbour for two years. He later joined Western Australian Government Railways, working his way from engine-cleaner to fireman to engine-driver. He had moved to Geraldton by 1902.

== Political career ==
Willcock became an active and enthusiastic member of the Labor Party (ALP), holding various offices in the Geraldton branch of the Engine Drivers', Firemen's and Cleaners' Union, and representing them at Federal conferences. From 1914 to 1917 he was President of the Geraldton District Council of the ALP, and he was a Justice of the Peace from 1915. On 14 April 1917 he contested the Western Australian Legislative Assembly seat of Geraldton in a by-election occasioned by the resignation of Edward Heitmann, but was defeated by Samuel Elliott. Five months later he won the seat in the general election of 29 September 1917. He was soon made a member of the executive of the Australian Workers' Union, and became secretary of the Parliamentary Labor Party.

On 16 April 1924, Willcock was appointed Minister for Railways and Justice and Minister for Police in the Collier ministry. He held the Police portfolio until 25 June 1928, and the Railways and Justice portfolio until the defeat of the Collier government on 23 April 1930. From 1927 to 1930 he was deputy leader of the Parliamentary Labor Party.

=== Premier of Western Australia ===
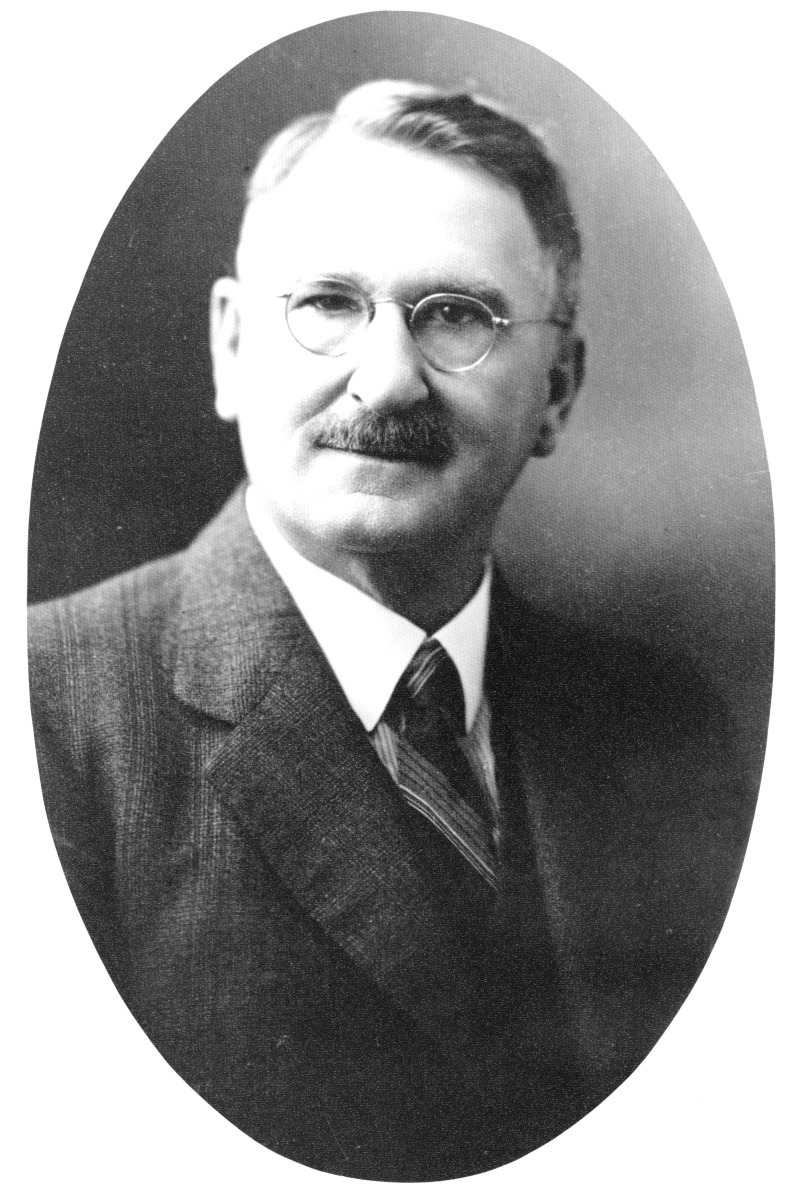
Willcock c. 1940

When the Labor party returned to power under Collier on 24 April 1933, Willcock resumed as Minister for Railways and Justice, and was also given the Education portfolio. He relinquished the Education portfolio on 26 March 1935, when he was reappointed deputy leader. On 19 August the following year, Collier stepped down as premier and leader of the Labor Party, and the following day Willcock was appointed his successor. Relinquishing the Railways and Justice portfolio, he took the offices of Premier, Treasurer and Minister for Forests. He dropped the Forests portfolio on 9 December 1943, but held the other offices for nearly nine years, resigning for reasons of ill health on 31 July 1945. During his time as Premier of Western Australia, Willcock represented Western Australia at the coronation of King George VI and Queen Elizabeth in May 1937. He was known for his "disarming modesty".

=== Retirement ===
After resigning as premier, Willcock retired to the backbenches until the general election of 15 March 1947, at which he did not re-contest his seat. He died on 7 June 1956 at St John of God Hospital, Subiaco, Western Australia, and was buried in Karrakatta Cemetery.

John Willcock College (opened as John Willcock Senior High School), established in Geraldton in 1975, was named after Willcock until it was renamed Champion Bay Senior High School.

== Personal life ==
In 1907, Willcock married Sicily Ann Stone, with whom he had six children. He was raised as a Methodist but converted to Catholicism in 1947.

Preceded by Philip Collier	Premier of Western Australia; 20 August 1936 – 31 July 1945	Succeeded by Frank Wise
