= Electoral results for the district of Moore =

Western Australian district election results

This is a list of electoral results for the electoral district of Moore in Western Australian state elections.

== Members for Moore ==
Moore (1890–1904)
Member	Party	Term
George Randell		1890–1892
Henry Lefroy	Ministerial	1892–1901
Michael O'Connor	Ministerial	1901–1904
Moore (1911–1930)
Member	Party	Term
Henry Lefroy	Liberal (WA)	1911–1917
Henry Lefroy	Nationalist	1917–1921
James Denton	Country	1921–1923
James Denton	Country (MCP)	1923–1924
James Denton	Nationalist	1924–1927
Percy Ferguson	Country	1927–1930
Moore (1950–present)
Member	Party	Term
John Ackland	Country	1950–1958
Edgar Lewis	Country	1958–1974
Bert Crane	Country	1974–1975
Bert Crane	National Country	1975–1985
Bert Crane	Liberal	1985–1989
Bill McNee	Liberal	1989–2005
Gary Snook	Liberal	2005–2008
Grant Woodhams	National	2008–2013
Shane Love	National	2013–present

== Election results ==
=== Elections in the 2020s ===
2021 Western Australian state election: Moore
Party	Candidate	Votes	%	±%
National	Shane Love	8,353	38.0	+1.1
Labor	Barni Norton	7,432	33.8	+13.9
Liberal	Darren Slyns	3,701	16.8	−2.0
Shooters, Fishers, Farmers	Ross Williamson	984	4.5	−1.3
Greens	Brian Spittles	638	2.9	−1.0
One Nation	Ian Frizzell	579	2.6	−10.1
No Mandatory Vaccination	T. Asmutaitis	233	1.1	+1.1
WAxit	Richard Banka	86	0.4	+0.4
Total formal votes		22,006	96.3	+0.3
Informal votes		855	3.7	−0.3
Turnout		22,861	87.9	−3.6
Two-candidate-preferred result
National	Shane Love	12,870	58.5	−6.3
Labor	Barni Norton	9,132	41.5	+41.5
National hold				

=== Elections in the 2010s ===
2017 Western Australian state election: Moore
Party	Candidate	Votes	%	±%
National	Shane Love	7,406	34.9	−2.2
Labor	Barni Norton	4,424	20.9	+4.5
Liberal	Darren Slyns	4,079	19.2	−19.8
One Nation	Jim Kelly	2,762	13.0	+13.0
Shooters, Fishers, Farmers	Ross Williamson	1,238	5.8	+5.8
Greens	Peter Leam	864	4.1	−1.5
Christians	Wes Porter	422	2.0	+0.1
Total formal votes		21,195	96.0	+1.0
Informal votes		876	4.0	−1.0
Turnout		22,071	89.8	+0.7
Two-party-preferred result
National	Shane Love	14,456	68.2	–5.0
Labor	Barni Norton	6,725	31.8	+5.0
Two-candidate-preferred result
National	Shane Love	13,534	63.9	+8.0
Liberal	Darren Slyns	7,638	36.1	−8.0
National hold		Swing	+8.0	

2013 Western Australian state election: Moore
Party	Candidate	Votes	%	±%
Liberal	Chris Wilkins	7,896	39.0	–1.5
National	Shane Love	7,510	37.1	+4.8
Labor	Peter Johnson	3,316	16.4	–0.3
Greens	Dee Margetts	1,131	5.6	–0.6
Christians	Wes Porter	386	1.9	+0.2
Total formal votes		20,239	95.0	–0.3
Informal votes		1,059	5.0	+0.3
Turnout		21,298	90.6	
Two-party-preferred result
Liberal	Chris Wilkins	14,810	73.2	+1.2
Labor	Peter Johnson	5,415	26.8	–1.2
Two-candidate-preferred result
National	Shane Love	11,299	55.9	+2.8
Liberal	Chris Wilkins	8,923	44.1	–2.8
National hold		Swing	+2.8	

=== Elections in the 2000s ===
2008 Western Australian state election: Moore
Party	Candidate	Votes	%	±%
Liberal	Gary Snook	7,556	40.5	−2.2
National	Grant Woodhams	6,025	32.3	+9.9
Labor	Peter Johnson	3,105	16.7	−3.4
Greens	Des Pike	1,157	6.2	+0.8
Family First	Boyd Davey	389	2.1	+2.1
Christian Democrats	Bernie Wallace	317	1.7	−0.2
	David Shier	49	0.3	+0.3
Citizens Electoral Council	Norman Gay	45	0.2	+0.2
Total formal votes		18,643	95.3	+0.4
Informal votes		918	4.7	−0.4
Turnout		19,561	87.8	
Two-candidate-preferred result
National	Grant Woodhams	9,884	53.1	+5.9
Liberal	Gary Snook	8,742	46.9	−5.9
National gain from Liberal		Swing	+5.9	

2005 Western Australian state election: Moore
Party	Candidate	Votes	%	±%
Liberal	Gary Snook	5,142	44.7	+13.0
Labor	Larraine Craven	2,441	21.2	+0.6
National	Peter Stubbs	1,999	17.4	+0.2
Greens	Sally Craddock	709	6.2	−0.1
One Nation	Kevan Brown	436	3.8	−19.4
New Country	Judy Roberts	312	2.7	+2.7
Independent	Bob Rogers	242	2.1	+2.1
Christian Democrats	David Hood	183	1.6	+1.6
Citizens Electoral Council	Judy Sudholz	38	0.3	+0.3
Total formal votes		11,502	94.6	−1.9
Informal votes		653	5.4	+1.9
Turnout		12,155	91.6	
Two-party-preferred result
Liberal	Gary Snook	7,734	67.3	+5.7
Labor	Larraine Craven	3,755	32.7	−5.7
Liberal hold		Swing	+5.7	

2001 Western Australian state election: Moore
Party	Candidate	Votes	%	±%
Liberal	Bill McNee	4,108	36.5	−41.4
One Nation	Stephen Peters	2,749	24.4	+24.4
Labor	Darren West	2,021	18.0	−4.1
National	Sue Metcalf	1,811	16.1	+16.1
Greens	Adrian Glamorgan	561	5.0	+5.0
Total formal votes		11,250	96.3	−1.1
Informal votes		431	3.7	+1.1
Turnout		11,681	93.2	
Two-party-preferred result
Liberal	Bill McNee	7,173	65.1	−12.8
Labor	Darren West	3,845	34.9	+12.8
Two-candidate-preferred result
Liberal	Bill McNee	7,033	62.9	−15.0
One Nation	Stephen Peters	4,148	37.1	+37.1
Liberal hold		Swing	−15.0	

=== Elections in the 1990s ===
1996 Western Australian state election: Moore
Party	Candidate	Votes	%	±%
Liberal	Bill McNee	8,497	77.9	+22.1
Labor	Steve Kirby	2,409	22.1	+3.7
Total formal votes		10,906	97.4	+0.6
Informal votes		291	2.6	−0.6
Turnout		11,197	91.7	
Liberal hold		Swing	−0.7	

1993 Western Australian state election: Moore
Party	Candidate	Votes	%	±%
Liberal	Bill McNee	6,069	53.0	+4.2
National	Dexter Davies	3,294	28.8	−1.2
Labor	Colin Meredith	2,082	18.2	+0.5
Total formal votes		11,445	97.0	+1.4
Informal votes		355	3.0	−1.4
Turnout		11,800	94.2	+2.0
Two-candidate-preferred result
Liberal	Bill McNee	6,387	55.8	+3.3
National	Dexter Davies	5,058	44.2	−3.3
Liberal hold		Swing	+3.3	

=== Elections in the 1980s ===
1989 Western Australian state election: Moore
Party	Candidate	Votes	%	±%
Liberal	Bill McNee	5,123	48.8	−4.3
National	Mort Schell	3,148	30.0	+0.3
Labor	John Mason	1,854	17.7	+0.5
Independent	Edna Smith	369	3.5	+3.5
Total formal votes		10,494	95.6	
Informal votes		487	4.4	
Turnout		10,981	92.2	
Two-candidate-preferred result
Liberal	Bill McNee	5,506	52.5	−3.2
National	Mort Schell	4,988	47.5	+3.2
Liberal hold		Swing	−3.2	

1986 Western Australian state election: Moore
Party	Candidate	Votes	%	±%
Liberal	Bert Crane	6,218	59.5	+33.6
Labor	Nicholas Agocs	2,400	23.0	+1.5
National	Frank Creagh	1,823	17.5	+17.5
Total formal votes		10,441	98.0	+0.5
Informal votes		216	2.0	−0.5
Turnout		10,657	93.3	+3.4
Two-party-preferred result
Liberal	Bert Crane	7,779	74.5	+37.8
Labor	Nicholas Agocs	2,662	25.5	+25.5
Liberal gain from National		Swing	N/A	

1983 Western Australian state election: Moore
Party	Candidate	Votes	%	±%
National Country	Bert Crane	4,295	52.6	
Liberal	Ernest Twine	2,117	25.9	
Labor	Michael O'Rourke	1,754	21.5	
Total formal votes		8,166	97.5	
Informal votes		205	2.5	
Turnout		8,371	89.9	
Two-candidate-preferred result
National Country	Bert Crane	5,169	63.3	
Liberal	Ernest Twine	2,997	36.7	
National Country hold		Swing		

1980 Western Australian state election: Moore
Party	Candidate	Votes	%	±%
National Country	Bert Crane	4,536	48.6	+4.1
Labor	John Halden	2,144	23.0	+1.9
Liberal	Michael Flanagan	2,113	22.6	−11.8
National	John Trewin	536	5.8	+5.8
Total formal votes		9,329	97.3	+0.7
Informal votes		263	2.7	−0.7
Turnout		9,592	90.4	−1.5
Two-party-preferred result
National Country	Bert Crane	6,823	73.1	−2.4
Labor	John Halden	2,506	26.9	+2.4
National Country hold		Swing	−2.4	

=== Elections in the 1970s ===
1977 Western Australian state election: Moore
Party	Candidate	Votes	%	±%
National Country	Bert Crane	3,395	44.5	
Liberal	Irwin Barrett-Lennard	2,625	34.4	
Labor	Ewold Jager	1,607	21.1	
Total formal votes		7,627	96.6	
Informal votes		272	3.4	
Turnout		7,899	91.9	
Two-candidate-preferred result
National Country	Bert Crane	4,827	63.3	
Liberal	Irwin Barrett-Lennard	2,800	36.7	
National Country hold		Swing		

1974 Western Australian state election: Moore
Party	Candidate	Votes	%	±%
National Alliance	Bert Crane	4,248	67.7	
Liberal	Terence Millstead	2,026	32.3	
Total formal votes		6,274	94.6	
Informal votes		358	5.4	
Turnout		6,632	90.5	
National Alliance hold		Swing		

1971 Western Australian state election: Moore
Party	Candidate	Votes	%	±%
Country	Edgar Lewis	3,167	45.6	−6.7
Labor	Michael Oxenburgh	1,795	25.9	+25.9
Democratic Labor	Gavin Drew	824	11.9	+11.9
Independent Liberal	Raymond Down	647	9.3	+9.3
United Farmers	Lesbia Yates	506	7.3	+7.3
Total formal votes		6,939	95.8	−1.6
Informal votes		304	4.2	+1.6
Turnout		7,243	93.7	+0.4
Two-party-preferred result
Country	Edgar Lewis	4,665	67.2	+14.9
Labor	Michael Oxenburgh	2,274	32.8	+32.8
Country hold		Swing	N/A	

=== Elections in the 1960s ===
1968 Western Australian state election: Moore
Party	Candidate	Votes	%	±%
Country	Edgar Lewis	2,984	52.3	
Independent	Albert Tonkin	2,721	47.7	
Total formal votes		5,705	97.4	
Informal votes		154	2.6	
Turnout		5,859	93.3	
Country hold		Swing		

1965 Western Australian state election: Moore
Party	Candidate	Votes	%	±%
Country	Edgar Lewis	3,383	68.0	−32.0
Independent	Albert Tonkin	1,596	32.0	+32.0
Total formal votes		4,979	97.9	
Informal votes		108	2.1	
Turnout		5,087	91.0	
Country hold		Swing	N/A	

1962 Western Australian state election: Moore
Party	Candidate	Votes	%	±%
Country	Edgar Lewis	unopposed		
Country hold		Swing		

=== Elections in the 1950s ===
1959 Western Australian state election: Moore
Party	Candidate	Votes	%	±%
Country	Edgar Lewis	unopposed		
Country hold		Swing		

1958 Moore state by-election
Party	Candidate	Votes	%	±%
Country	Hubert Shields	1,324	34.3	N/A
Country	Edgar Lewis	1,036	26.8	N/A
Country	Ronald Elphick	817	21.1	N/A
Independent	Albert Tonkin	685	17.7	+17.7
Total formal votes		3,862	98.7	
Informal votes		50	1.3	
Turnout		3,912	81.5	
Two-candidate-preferred result
Country	Edgar Lewis	2,012	52.1	N/A
Country	Hubert Shields	1,850	47.9	N/A
Country hold		Swing	N/A	

1956 Western Australian state election: Moore
Party	Candidate	Votes	%	±%
Country	John Ackland	unopposed		
Country hold		Swing		

1953 Western Australian state election: Moore
Party	Candidate	Votes	%	±%
Country	John Ackland	unopposed		
Country hold		Swing		

1950 Western Australian state election: Moore
Party	Candidate	Votes	%	±%
Country	John Ackland	unopposed		
Country hold		Swing		

=== Elections in the 1920s ===
1927 Western Australian state election: Moore
Party	Candidate	Votes	%	±%
Country	Percy Ferguson	1,439	60.6	+21.9
Nationalist	James Denton	935	39.4	−13.7
Total formal votes		2,344	98.7	+1.0
Informal votes		30	1.3	−1.0
Turnout		2,404	64.8	+10.8
Country gain from Nationalist		Swing	N/A	

1924 Western Australian state election: Moore
Party	Candidate	Votes	%	±%
Country	James Denton	911	53.1	+6.2
Executive Country	Victor Spencer	388	22.6	+0.9
Executive Country	Alexander Stone	172	10.0	+10.0
Independent	George Welch	139	8.1	+8.1
Executive Country	James Jones	105	6.1	+6.1
Total formal votes		1,715	97.7	+0.4
Informal votes		41	2.3	−0.4
Turnout		1,756	54.0	+8.1
Country hold		Swing	N/A	

1921 Western Australian state election: Moore
Party	Candidate	Votes	%	±%
Country	James Denton	561	46.9	+46.9
Country	Henry Lefroy	376	31.4	−68.6
Country	Victor Spencer	260	21.7	+21.7
Total formal votes		1,197	97.3	
Informal votes		33	2.7	
Turnout		1,230	45.9	
Two-candidate-preferred result
Country	James Denton	707	59.1	+59.1
Country	Henry Lefroy	490	40.9	−59.1
Country gain from Nationalist		Swing	N/A	

=== Elections in the 1910s ===
1917 Western Australian state election: Moore
Party	Candidate	Votes	%	±%
National Liberal	Sir Henry Lefroy	unopposed		
National Liberal hold		Swing		

1914 Western Australian state election: Moore
Party	Candidate	Votes	%	±%
Liberal	Henry Lefroy	687	53.0	+19.1
Country	Duncan Munro	609	47.0	+47.0
Total formal votes		1,296	99.7	+1.6
Informal votes		4	0.3	−1.6
Turnout		1,300	37.9	−25.4
Liberal hold		Swing	N/A	

1911 Western Australian state election: Moore
Party	Candidate	Votes	%	±%
Ministerialist	Henry Lefroy	511	33.9	
Labor	Thomas Clune	412	27.4	
Ministerialist	Duncan Munro	209	13.9	
Ministerialist	James Spiers	160	10.6	
Ministerialist	James Huggins	155	10.3	
Ministerialist	John O'Neil	59	3.9	
Total formal votes		1,506	98.1	
Informal votes		29	1.9	
Turnout		1,535	63.3	
Two-party-preferred result
Ministerialist	Henry Lefroy	992	65.9	
Labor	Thomas Clune	514	34.1	
Ministerialist hold		Swing		

=== Elections in the 1900s ===
1901 Western Australian state election: Moore
Party	Candidate	Votes	%	±%
Ministerialist	Michael O'Connor	266	62.9	+62.9
Opposition	William Loton	157	37.1	+37.1
Total formal votes		423	98.8	+1.4
Informal votes		5	1.2	–1.4
Turnout		428	64.4	–17.1
Ministerialist hold		Swing	N/A	

=== Elections in the 1890s ===
1897 Western Australian colonial election: Moore
Party	Candidate	Votes	%	±%
Ministerialist	Henry Lefroy	165	63.2	
Ministerialist	Jeremiah Clune	96	36.8	
Total formal votes		261	97.4	
Informal votes		7	2.6	
Turnout		268	81.5	
Ministerialist hold		Swing		

1894 Western Australian colonial election: Moore
Party	Candidate	Votes	%	±%
None	Henry Lefroy	unopposed		

1892 Moore colonial by-election
Party	Candidate	Votes	%	±%
None	Henry Lefroy	unopposed		

1890 Western Australian colonial election: Moore
Party	Candidate	Votes	%	±%
None	George Randell	unopposed		
