= Electoral results for the district of Irwin =

Western Australian district election results

This is a list of electoral results for the Electoral district of Irwin in Western Australian state elections.

== Members for Irwin ==
Irwin (1890–1930)
Member	Party	Term
Samuel J. Phillips	Ministerial	1890–1904
Samuel Moore	Ministerial	1904–1911
Samuel Moore	Liberal	1911–1914
James Gardiner	Country	1914–1921
Charles Maley	Country	1921–1923
Charles Maley	Country (MCP)	1923–1924
Charles Maley	Nationalist	1924–1928
Charles Maley	Country	1928–1929
Henry Maley	Country	1929–1930
Irwin-Moore (1930–1950)
Member	Party	Term
Percy Ferguson	Country	1930–1939
Claude Barker	Independent	1939
Horace Berry	Independent	1939–1947
John Ackland	Country	1947–1950

== Election results ==
=== Elections in the 1940s ===
1947 Western Australian state election: Irwin-Moore
Party	Candidate	Votes	%	±%
Country	John Ackland	1,443	52.3	+38.6
Labor	Luke Travers	660	23.9	+2.6
Independent	Horace Berry	658	23.8	−31.9
Total formal votes		2,761	99.2	+0.8
Informal votes		23	0.8	−0.8
Turnout		2,784	80.3	−1.4
Country gain from Independent		Swing	N/A	

- Preferences were not distributed.

1943 Western Australian state election: Irwin-Moore
Party	Candidate	Votes	%	±%
Independent	Horace Berry	1,491	55.7	+55.7
Labor	Angus Thomson	570	21.3	+21.3
Country	Ida Swift	366	13.7	−31.3
Country	Terence Millsteed	249	9.3	+9.3
Total formal votes		2,676	98.4	−0.6
Informal votes		44	0.6	+0.6
Turnout		2,720	81.7	−6.9
Independent hold		Swing	N/A	

- Preferences were not distributed.

=== Elections in the 1930s ===
1939 Western Australian state election: Irwin-Moore
Party	Candidate	Votes	%	±%
Independent	Claude Barker	1,648	55.0	+55.0
Country	Percy Ferguson	1,349	45.0	−26.4
Total formal votes		2,997	99.0	+0.1
Informal votes		30	1.0	−0.1
Turnout		3,027	88.6	+24.0
Independent gain from Country		Swing	N/A	

1936 Western Australian state election: Irwin-Moore
Party	Candidate	Votes	%	±%
Country	Percy Ferguson	1,506	71.4	+17.3
Independent	Cyril Rodoreda	602	28.6	+28.6
Total formal votes		2,108	98.9	+0.7
Informal votes		23	1.1	−0.7
Turnout		2,131	64.6	−21.2
Country hold		Swing	N/A	

1933 Western Australian state election: Irwin-Moore
Party	Candidate	Votes	%	±%
Country	Percy Ferguson	1,590	54.1	−12.0
Nationalist	Edmund Nicholson	980	33.3	−0.5
Country	Corintin Honner	371	12.6	+12.6
Total formal votes		2,941	98.2	−0.5
Informal votes		54	1.8	+0.5
Turnout		2,995	85.8	+21.8
Country hold		Swing	N/A	

- Preferences were not distributed.

1930 Western Australian state election: Irwin-Moore
Party	Candidate	Votes	%	±%
Country	Percy Ferguson	1,483	66.2	
Nationalist	James Denton	759	33.8	
Total formal votes		2,242	98.7	
Informal votes		30	1.3	
Turnout		2,272	64.0	
Country hold		Swing		

=== Elections in the 1920s ===
1929 Irwin state by-election
Party	Candidate	Votes	%	±%
Country	John Stratton	961	41.2	−3.4
Nationalist	James Denton	549	23.5	−31.9
Country	Henry Maley	494	21.2	+21.2
Country	Hugh McNeill	330	14.1	+14.1
Total formal votes		2,334	98.9	−0.5
Informal votes		25	1.1	+0.5
Turnout		2,359	52.5	−11.7
Two-candidate-preferred result
Country	Henry Maley	1,175	50.3	
Country	John Stratton	1,159	49.7	
Country gain from Nationalist		Swing	N/A	

1927 Western Australian state election: Irwin
Party	Candidate	Votes	%	±%
Nationalist	Charles Maley	1,327	55.4	+9.8
Country	John Stratton	1,070	44.6	−9.8
Total formal votes		2,397	99.4	+1.2
Informal votes		15	0.6	−1.2
Turnout		2,412	64.2	+4.2
Nationalist hold		Swing	−5.9	

1924 Western Australian state election: Irwin
Party	Candidate	Votes	%	±%
Country	Charles Maley	796	45.6	+17.3
Executive Country	John Stratton	534	30.6	+30.6
Country	William Mitchell	355	20.3	−7.3
Executive Country	George Matthews	62	3.5	+3.5
Total formal votes		1,747	98.2	+1.8
Informal votes		32	1.8	−1.8
Turnout		1,779	60.0	+12.3
Two-candidate-preferred result
Country	Charles Maley	1,071	61.3	+8.2
Executive Country	John Stratton	676	38.7	+38.7
Country hold		Swing	N/A	

1921 Western Australian state election: Irwin
Party	Candidate	Votes	%	±%
Country	Charles Maley	304	28.3	−71.7
Country	William Mitchell	296	27.6	+27.6
Country	Henry Carson	143	13.3	+13.3
Country	Frederick Gill	116	10.8	+10.8
Independent	William Clarke	80	7.5	+7.5
Country	Edward Lang	74	6.9	+6.9
Country	Henry Carr	60	5.6	+5.6
Total formal votes		1,073	96.4	
Informal votes		40	3.6	
Turnout		1,113	47.7	
Two-candidate-preferred result
Country	Charles Maley	571	53.2	−46.8
Country	William Mitchell	502	46.8	+46.8
Country hold		Swing	N/A	

=== Elections in the 1910s ===
1917 Western Australian state election: Irwin
Party	Candidate	Votes	%	±%
National Country	James Gardiner	unopposed		
National Country hold		Swing		

1914 Western Australian state election: Irwin
Party	Candidate	Votes	%	±%
Country	James Gardiner	728	59.7	+59.7
Liberal	Samuel Moore	492	40.3	−2.7
Total formal votes		1,220	99.8	+1.0
Informal votes		2	0.2	−1.0
Turnout		1,222	44.2	−25.3
Country gain from Liberal		Swing	N/A	

1911 Western Australian state election: Irwin
Party	Candidate	Votes	%	±%
Ministerialist	Samuel Moore	479	43.0	
Ministerialist	James Gardiner	370	33.2	
Labor	Archibald McDonald	265	23.8	
Total formal votes		1,114	98.8	
Informal votes		14	1.2	
Turnout		1,128	69.5	
Two-candidate-preferred result
Ministerialist	Samuel Moore	586	52.6	
Ministerialist	James Gardiner	528	47.4	
Ministerialist hold		Swing		

=== Elections in the 1900s ===
1908 Western Australian state election: Irwin
Party	Candidate	Votes	%	±%
Ministerialist	Samuel Moore	520	51.4	−48.6
Ministerialist	James Huggins	297	29.4	+29.4
Ministerialist	William Jose	194	19.2	+19.2
Total formal votes		1,011	97.9	
Informal votes		22	2.1	
Turnout		1,033	53.6	
Ministerialist hold		Swing	N/A	

1905 Western Australian state election: Irwin
Party	Candidate	Votes	%	±%
Ministerialist	Samuel Moore	unopposed		
Ministerialist hold		Swing		

1904 Western Australian state election: Irwin
Party	Candidate	Votes	%	±%
Ministerialist	Samuel Moore	454	65.0	+65.0
Independent	William Philbey	134	19.2	+19.2
Ministerialist	Charles Cheeseborough	110	15.8	+15.8
Total formal votes		698	98.9	n/a
Informal votes		8	1.1	n/a
Turnout		706	46.7	n/a
Ministerialist hold		Swing	N/A	

1901 Western Australian state election: Irwin
Party	Candidate	Votes	%	±%
Ministerialist	Samuel Phillips	unopposed		
Ministerialist hold		Swing		

=== Elections in the 1890s ===
1897 Western Australian colonial election: Irwin
Party	Candidate	Votes	%	±%
Ministerialist	Samuel J. Phillips	unopposed		
Ministerialist hold		Swing		

1894 Western Australian colonial election: Irwin
Party	Candidate	Votes	%	±%
None	Samuel Phillips	unopposed		

1890 Western Australian colonial election: Irwin
Party	Candidate	Votes	%	±%
None	Samuel Phillips	unopposed		
