= Electoral results for the district of Mount Marshall =

Western Australian district election results

This is a list of electoral results for the electoral district of Mount Marshall in Western Australian state elections.

== Members for Mount Marshall ==
Member	Party	Term
John Lindsay	Country	1930–1933
Frederick Warner	Ind. Country	1933–1936
Frederick Warner	Country	1936–1943
Hugh Leslie	Country	1943–1950
George Cornell	Country	1950–1967
Ray McPharlin	Country	1967–1975
Ray McPharlin	National Country	1975–1978
Ray McPharlin	National (WA)	1978–1982
Ray McPharlin	National Country	1982–1983
Bill McNee	Liberal	1983–1986
Mort Schell	National	1986–1989

== Election results ==
=== Elections in the 1980s ===
1986 Western Australian state election: Mount Marshall
Party	Candidate	Votes	%	±%
Liberal	Bill McNee	3,596	44.0	+11.0
National	Mort Schell	3,220	39.4	+16.3
Labor	Robert Couzens	1,358	16.6	−0.4
Total formal votes		8,174	98.5	+0.9
Informal votes		125	1.5	−0.9
Turnout		8,299	93.8	+4.0
Two-candidate-preferred result
National	Mort Schell	4,357	53.3	+9.0
Liberal	Bill McNee	3,817	46.7	−9.0
National gain from Liberal		Swing	+9.0	

1983 Western Australian state election: Mount Marshall
Party	Candidate	Votes	%	±%
Liberal	Bill McNee	2,596	33.0	
National Country	Ray McPharlin	2,119	26.9	
National	Ronald Aitkenhead	1,815	23.1	
Labor	Robert Couzens	1,333	17.0	
Total formal votes		7,863	97.6	
Informal votes		191	2.4	
Turnout		8,054	89.8	
Two-candidate-preferred result
Liberal	Bill McNee	4,381	55.7	
National	Ronald Aitkenhead	3,482	44.3	
Liberal gain from National Country		Swing		

1980 Western Australian state election: Mount Marshall
Party	Candidate	Votes	%	±%
National	Ray McPharlin	3,958	56.1	+56.1
Liberal	Bill McNee	1,769	25.1	−5.1
National Country	Joan Hardwick	1,323	18.8	−51.0
Total formal votes		7,050	97.7	+1.3
Informal votes		163	2.3	−1.3
Turnout		7,213	91.6	0.0
Two-candidate-preferred result
National	Walter McPharlin	4,289	60.8	+60.8
Liberal	Bill McNee	2,761	39.2	+9.0
National gain from National Country		Swing	N/A	

=== Elections in the 1970s ===
1977 Western Australian state election: Mount Marshall
Party	Candidate	Votes	%	±%
National Country	Ray McPharlin	4,937	69.8	
Liberal	Harold Lundy	2,140	30.2	
Total formal votes		7,077	96.4	
Informal votes		265	3.6	
Turnout		7,342	91.6	
National Country hold		Swing	N/A	

1974 Western Australian state election: Mount Marshall
Party	Candidate	Votes	%	±%
National Alliance	Ray McPharlin	unopposed		
National Alliance hold		Swing		

1971 Western Australian state election: Mount Marshall
Party	Candidate	Votes	%	±%
Country	Ray McPharlin	3,229	56.8	−43.2
Labor	Kathleen Knopp	1,237	21.8	+21.8
United Farmers	Kenneth May	715	12.6	+12.6
Democratic Labor	Ronald Richards	505	8.9	+8.9
Total formal votes		5,686	96.4	
Informal votes		211	3.6	
Turnout		5,897	91.9	
Two-party-preferred result
Country	Ray McPharlin	4,126	72.6	−27.4
Labor	Kathleen Knopp	1,560	27.4	+27.4
Country hold		Swing	N/A	

=== Elections in the 1960s ===
1968 Western Australian state election: Mount Marshall
Party	Candidate	Votes	%	±%
Country	Ray McPharlin	unopposed		
Country hold		Swing		

1967 Mount Marshall state by-election
Party	Candidate	Votes	%	±%
Country	Ray McPharlin	2,662	64.21	
Liberal	Bill McNee	1,010	24.36	
Labor	Djordje Miličić	474	11.43	
Total formal votes		4,146	98.55	
Informal votes		61	1.45	
Turnout		4,207	80.89	
Country hold		Swing	N/A	

1965 Western Australian state election: Mount Marshall
Party	Candidate	Votes	%	±%
Country	George Cornell	unopposed		
Country hold		Swing		

1962 Western Australian state election: Mount Marshall
Party	Candidate	Votes	%	±%
Country	George Cornell	unopposed		
Country hold		Swing		

=== Elections in the 1950s ===
1959 Western Australian state election: Mount Marshall
Party	Candidate	Votes	%	±%
Country	George Cornell	unopposed		
Country hold		Swing		

1956 Western Australian state election: Mount Marshall
Party	Candidate	Votes	%	±%
Country	George Cornell	unopposed		
Country hold		Swing		

1953 Western Australian state election: Mount Marshall
Party	Candidate	Votes	%	±%
Country	George Cornell	unopposed		
Country hold		Swing		

1950 Western Australian state election: Mount Marshall
Party	Candidate	Votes	%	±%
Country	George Cornell	unopposed		
Country hold		Swing		

=== Elections in the 1940s ===
1947 Western Australian state election: Mount Marshall
Party	Candidate	Votes	%	±%
Country	Hugh Leslie	unopposed		
Country hold		Swing		

1943 Western Australian state election: Mount Marshall
Party	Candidate	Votes	%	±%
Labor	Stanley Hook	996	35.7	+35.7
Country	Hugh Leslie	950	34.0	−20.4
Independent	John Lindsay	845	30.3	+30.3
Total formal votes		2,791	98.0	−0.6
Informal votes		57	2.0	+0.6
Turnout		2,848	82.2	−8.1
Two-party-preferred result
Country	Hugh Leslie	1,605	57.5	+3.1
Labor	Stanley Hook	1,186	42.5	+42.5
Country hold		Swing	N/A	

=== Elections in the 1930s ===
1939 Western Australian state election: Mount Marshall
Party	Candidate	Votes	%	±%
Country	Frederick Warner	1,919	54.4	−19.2
Independent Country	Len Hamilton	1,608	45.6	+45.6
Total formal votes		3,527	98.6	−0.8
Informal votes		50	1.4	+0.8
Turnout		3,577	90.3	+28.1
Country hold		Swing	N/A	

1936 Western Australian state election: Mount Marshall
Party	Candidate	Votes	%	±%
Country	Frederick Warner	1,933	73.6	+18.8
Country	Joseph Diver	694	26.4	+26.4
Total formal votes		2,627	99.4	+0.4
Informal votes		17	0.6	−0.4
Turnout		2,644	62.2	−23.0
Country hold		Swing	N/A	

1933 Western Australian state election: Mount Marshall
Party	Candidate	Votes	%	±%
Independent Country	Frederick Warner	2,030	54.8	+54.8
Country	John Lindsay	1,673	45.2	−26.8
Total formal votes		3,703	99.0	−0.3
Informal votes		37	1.0	+0.3
Turnout		3,740	85.2	+17.9
Independent Country gain from Country		Swing	N/A	

1930 Western Australian state election: Mount Marshall
Party	Candidate	Votes	%	±%
Country	John Lindsay	2,356	72.0	
Labor	John Mulqueeny	915	28.0	
Total formal votes		3,271	99.3	
Informal votes		24	0.7	
Turnout		3,295	67.3	
Country hold		Swing		
