= Horace Berry =

Australian politician

Member of the Legislative Assembly of Western Australia
- In office 9 September 1939 – 15 March 1947
- Preceded by: Claude Barker
- Succeeded by: None (abolished)
- Constituency: Irwin-Moore

Personal details
- Born: 1891 Suva, Fiji
- Died: 1 September 1949 (aged 57–58) Nedlands, Western Australia, Australia
- Party: Independent

Horace Thurston Berry (1891 – 1 September 1949) was an Australian politician who was an independent member of the Legislative Assembly of Western Australia from 1939 to 1947, representing the seat of Irwin-Moore.

== Family ==
Berry was born in Suva, Fiji, to Sarah Eugene (née Morey) and John Berry. His father, an Australian, had been posted to Fiji as the colony's Commissioner of Lands and Surveys. The family returned to Australia in 1900 and settled in Sydney, where Berry attended Sydney Grammar School and The King's School, Parramatta.

== Military career ==
He enlisted in the Australian Imperial Force in August 1915, and later joined the British Army's Royal Flying Corps, finishing the war with the rank of flying officer.

== After the war ==
In 1919, Berry went to Malaya, where he managed a rubber plantation in Kajang, Selangor. He returned to Australia in 1930, purchasing a property at Yerecoin (a locality in Western Australia's Wheatbelt region).

== Political career ==
Berry first attempted to enter politics at the 1934 Legislative Council elections, where he lost to Vernon Hamersley in East Province. In the late 1930s, he retired from farming to live in Rockingham (on the outskirts of Perth), and served a term on the Rockingham Road Board. Berry succeeded in entering parliament on his second attempt, defeating Country and Labor Party candidates to win the 1939 Irwin-Moore by-election as an independent. The by-election had been caused by the resignation of Claude Barker, who campaigned on Berry's behalf. Berry retained Irwin-Moore at the 1943 state election, but the seat was abolished prior the 1947 election. He instead contested the new seat of Moore, but was defeated by the Country Party's John Ackland. After leaving parliament, he was re-elected to the Rockingham Road Board, serving as chairman for a period. Berry died in Perth in September 1949.

Parliament of Western Australia
Preceded by Claude Barker	Member for Irwin-Moore; 1939–1947	Abolished
