= Edgar Lewis =

Edgar Lewis may refer to:

- Edgar Lewis (politician)
- Edgar Lewis (director)
