= James Samuel Denton =

Australian politician (1875–1963)

James Denton DSO

Member of the Legislative Assembly of Western Australia
- In office 12 March 1921 – 26 March 1927
- Preceded by: Henry Lefroy
- Succeeded by: Percy Ferguson
- Constituency: Moore

Personal details
- Born: 11 December 1875 Port Adelaide, South Australia
- Died: 3 June 1963 (aged 87) Nedlands, Western Australia
- Party: Country (to 1924); Nationalist (from 1924)

Military service
- Allegiance: Australia
- Branch/service: WA Defence Force (to 1901); Australian Army (from 1901)
- Years of service: 1899–1919
- Rank: Lieutenant Colonel
- Commands: 10th Battalion; 11th Battalion; 70th Battalion; 49th Battalion; 3rd Training Brigade
- Battles/wars: First World War; Landing at Gallipoli; Battle of Pozières; First Battle of Villers-Bretonneux; Second Battle of Villers-Bretonneux
- Awards: Distinguished Service Order; Mentioned in Despatches

James Samuel Denton, DSO (11 December 1875 – 3 June 1963) was an Australian Army officer and politician. He was awarded the Distinguished Service Order for his actions in the landing at Gallipoli, and later reached the rank of lieutenant colonel. He farmed at Moora, Western Australia, after the war's end, and was a member of the Legislative Assembly of Western Australia from 1921 to 1927, representing the seat of Moore.

== Early life and military service ==
Denton was born in Port Adelaide, South Australia, to Margaret (née Smith) and Cincinnatus Denton. He was educated in Melbourne, and came to Western Australia in 1896, initially working as a clerk with Western Australian Government Railways. Denton enlisted in the Metropolitan Rifle Volunteers (part of Western Australia's colonial forces) in November 1899, as a second lieutenant. He was promoted lieutenant in 1902 and captain in 1907, by which time his unit had become the 11th Australian Infantry Regiment of the Australian Army. Denton transferred to the 88th (Perth) Infantry Regiment in 1912, which was part of the Citizens Forces rather than the regular army. However, on the outbreak of the First World War he enlisted in the Australian Imperial Force, commanding a company of the 11th Battalion and receiving a corresponding promotion to major in January 1915.

In the landing at Gallipoli on 25 April 1915, Denton was wounded in the leg. He remained on duty for some time before being evacuated, during which he helped to organise the transmission of information between the onshore artillery and the offshore naval support. Denton was mentioned in despatches for his actions, and later in the year was awarded the Distinguished Service Order (DSO), becoming the first officer of the 3rd Brigade to receive that honour. He was hospitalised on Malta from July 1915 to January 1916, when he rejoined the 11th Battalion as its second-in-command. After training in Egypt, the unit was moved on to the Western Front, arriving in France in April 1916. It was subsequently involved in the Battle of Pozières.

Denton was promoted temporary lieutenant colonel in September 1916, and held temporary command of the 11th Battalion for a few weeks. He also held temporary command of the 10th Battalion at Ypres for a few days. Denton was granted three months' leave in October 1916, due to his wife's terminal illness. On his return, he briefly commanded the 70th Battalion and then in March 1917 was given command of the 49th Battalion. Denton led the unit at the First and Second Battles of Villers-Bretonneux. He was confirmed as a lieutenant colonel in September 1917, but in May 1918 was wounded again and had to be evacuated to England. Denton was then given command of the 3rd Training Brigade from June 1918 to January 1919. He was discharged from the AIF in August 1919.

== Politics ==
After leaving the army, Denton began farming in Berkshire Valley, a locality near Moora (a small Wheatbelt town). Motivated by the need for adequate political representation for returned soldiers, he entered parliament at the 1921 state election, standing as one of three Country Party candidates in the seat of Moore. The sitting member (who Denton defeated) was Sir Henry Lefroy, a former premier. The Country Party split into two rival factions in 1923, and Denton joined the Ministerial (or Government) faction, which supported the government of Sir James Mitchell.

Denton was re-elected with an increased majority at the 1924 state election, defeating three candidates from the opposing Executive (or Opposition) faction. He and the other Ministerialists joined the Nationalist Party later in the year, along with the remaining members of the National Labor Party. At the 1927 state election, Denton suffered a large swing against him and was defeated by Percy Ferguson, a farmer from Moora standing for the Country Party. He attempted to re-enter parliament at the 1929 Irwin by-election (caused by the death of Charles Maley), but was defeated by the deceased member's brother, Henry Maley. He failed to even make the two-candidate-preferred count, polling just 23.5 percent on first preferences. Denton's last run for parliament came at the 1930 state election, in the new seat of Irwin-Moore. He faced Percy Ferguson, his opponent from 1927, but again lost by a large margin.

== Later life ==
Denton retired to Perth in 1929. He remained involved in public life, serving as general secretary of the New Settlers' League (a migration-assistance group) from 1935 to 1940. During the Second World War, he commanded a battalion of the Home Guard. He was married twice, firstly to Eleanor Hambry in 1899. They had no children, and she died in 1916. Denton remarried in 1922 to Alice Donovan, and they had one son together. He was widowed again in 1961. Denton died at Sir Charles Gairdner Hospital in June 1963, aged 86.

Parliament of Western Australia
Preceded by Henry Lefroy	Member for Moore; 1921–1927	Succeeded by Percy Ferguson
