= James Gardiner (Australian politician) =

Australian politician

The Honourable James Gardiner
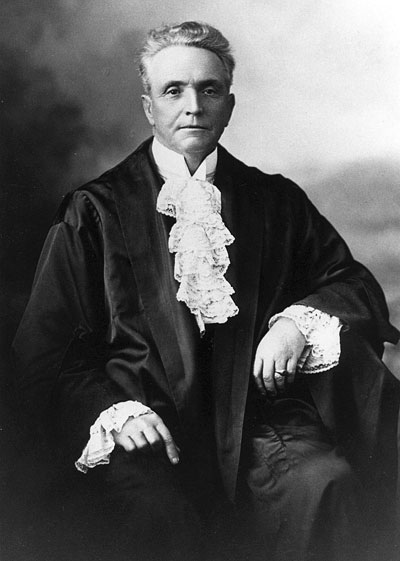

7th Speaker of the Legislative Assembly of Western Australia
- In office 1 March – 28 June 1917
- Preceded by: Bertie Johnston
- Succeeded by: George Taylor

Leader of the Country Party in Western Australia
- In office 21 October 1914 – 18 March 1915
- Deputy: Francis Willmott
- Preceded by: None (new position)
- Succeeded by: Francis Willmott

Member of the Legislative Assembly of Western Australia
- In office 24 April 1901 – 28 June 1904
- Preceded by: John Hassell
- Succeeded by: Charles Keyser
- Constituency: Albany
- In office 21 October 1914 – 12 March 1921
- Preceded by: Samuel Moore
- Succeeded by: Charles Maley
- Constituency: Irwin

Personal details
- Born: 12 June 1861 Papakura, New Zealand
- Died: 27 October 1928 (aged 67) Perth, Western Australia
- Party: Liberal (1911); Country (from 1914)

James Gardiner (12 June 1861 – 27 October 1928) was an Australian politician who served in the Legislative Assembly of Western Australia from 1901 to 1904 and from 1914 to 1921. He served as colonial treasurer under two premiers, Walter James and Henry Lefroy. Gardiner was also the inaugural state leader of the Country Party from 1914 to 1915, and briefly served as Speaker of the Legislative Assembly from March to June 1917.

== Early life ==
Gardiner was born at Papakura, New Zealand (south of Auckland), to Mary (née Craig) and George Gardiner. Moving to South Australia early in 1865, Gardiner was initially educated in Port Augusta then from 1870 in Saddleworth. After he left school at age 11, he worked in the business of wheat-buyers Ernst Siekmann and John Moule (politician), then with the South Australian Carrying Company Limited for three years and other commercial companies in Saddleworth.

From 1882 to 1885, he was an accountant in Naracoorte, and secretary of its Pastoral and Agricultural Society, the Naracoorte Institute and the Naracoorte Turf Club. In early 1886, Gardiner briefly took a post as a provisional school teacher at Lochaber, South Australia.

Gardiner then worked from mid-1886 in Melbourne as an accountant and auctioneer for William Hamilton & Co., a stock and station agency. After leaving the stock and station agency about 1893, Gardiner set up business for himself for two years, then accepted a position with the publisher Gordon & Gotch. Following news of gold strikes in Coolgardie and Kalgoorlie, Western Australia, Gardiner was sent to Perth in 1895 to establish and manage a new branch.

Gardiner relinquished his position with Gordon & Gotch to set up his own auctioneering business in 1900 which promoted suburban and rural land sales. He also pursued land settlement and development, and was foremost in developing land around the Moora region.

From 1897 to 1899 he served as chairman of the Western Australian Cricket Council. He subsequently served two further terms as president of the Western Australian Cricket Association (WACA), 1906 to 1915 and 1917 to 1924.

== Western Australian federation ==
Gardiner ran for parliament at the 1900 Albany by-election, after George Leake resigned. Although he lost that by-election, he was actively involved in the campaign for the federation of Australia. During the federal campaign, the Western Australian parliament at first refused the people of the colony the right to vote for or against accepting the draft Commonwealth constitution, a right available to electors in all other Australian colonies. James Gardiner, George Leake and Walter James, with other supporters of federation, promoted the 'Bill to the People Petition' supporting federal union. The petition was initially unheeded by parliament, but the cause was furthered by the 'Separation for Federation' movement on the goldfields. There was strong anti-federation sentiment in the farming, coal mining and viticulture industries, owing to fears that the abolition of inter-colonial import tariffs and the inception of free trade with the eastern colonies would ruin these industries. Gardiner campaigned with Walter James in June 1900 to allay the fears of Collie coal miners that the coal industry would suffer as a result of federation. The miners ultimately voted for federation on 31 July 1900.

== Politics 1901-1904 ==
Gardiner again contested the seat of Albany at the 1901 state election and was elected. A new government under Walter James emerged in July 1902, and Gardiner was appointed colonial treasurer. Aware that Federation disadvantaged Western Australia due to the loss of revenue previously raised through inter-colonial customs duties, he implemented a five per cent duty on the dividends of companies carrying out business in Western Australia to help raise the diminishing state revenue.

In February 1904, Gardiner attended the State Treasurers' Conference in Melbourne where, among other issues, he argued against changes to the system of collecting customs revenue, which would have reduced Western Australia's total revenue and increased the revenue of the other Australian states. He was forced to resign from parliament in April 1904 to reconsolidate his firm's business.

== Midland Railway Company ==
Free of political responsibilities, Gardiner then began forging a significant working relationship with the Midland Railway Company to promote land sales. His first association with the company was in July 1905, when he drafted a scheme for land sales. The company was in litigation with the Western Australian Government, which was claiming payments from the company for pastoral rents and licence fees. Gardiner negotiated with Premier Hector Rason and restrictions on land sales were withdrawn. Gardiner pursued a scheme of land development and settlement for the company until 1918, including the Improved Farms Scheme to sell ready-made farms in Carnamah, Winchester and Coorow.

== Western Australian Country Party ==
During his association with the Midland Railway Company, Gardiner attempted a return to parliament in October 1911 when he contested the seat of Irwin. Running against two other candidates, he lost to a Liberal rival. He became involved with the Farmers and Settlers' Association (FSA) of Western Australia. Gardiner presided over a conference in June 1912, which ratified the objectives of the FSA. In March 1913, the FSA formed its own political party to contest state and federal elections. The Western Australian Country Party was engineered as the political wing of the FSA, and the FSA president, A.J. Monger, was paramount in helping to found the party. Gardiner was a member of the FSA executive committee.

In 1914, a major drought had caused widespread failure of crops. The government was providing drought relief payments to all settlers except those settled by the Midland Railway Company, as the minister for lands, James Mitchell, considered that the company should provide its own relief support. Gardiner used his political influence to advantage when he interviewed Premier John Scaddan in September 1914 and managed to secure an advance from the government for seeding crops, feed and water supplies.

In October 1914, Gardiner was elected to parliament as the member for the seat of Irwin. He was subsequently elected as the first parliamentary leader of the Country Party in Western Australia. Increasingly, Gardiner took a pro-Labor stance to favour farmers in the newer wheatbelt areas, which drew further criticism of him from the government opposition, the government and from his own party.

A nervous breakdown in March 1915 forced Gardiner to resign as leader of the Western Australian Country Party. Francis Willmott was elected leader, and he led the Country Party to again adopt an anti-Labor stance. Upon his return to duties in June, Gardiner continued to serve in the party but persistently upheld Labor policies. Following a period of rebuilding his political status, he was elected Speaker of the Legislative Assembly in March 1917 after the previous speaker, Bertie Johnston, resigned. Gardiner's deafness was a disadvantage, and he was reappointed as colonial treasurer in June when the Lefroy Ministry was appointed.

== National Country Party ==
During 1916 and early 1917, progress was made by the eastern states' country parties to form a national party. A proposed coalition of the Western Australian Country Party with the Liberal Party and National Labor Party in May 1917 was followed through by Gardiner. He led the Country Party into the Lefroy coalition government, which comprised Liberal, Country Party and National Labor representatives. Gardiner was elected unopposed in the general elections in September, representing the National Country Party.

In January and February 1919, Gardiner was stranded in Melbourne for several weeks, owing to the Spanish flu pandemic and a seamen's strike. The acting Western Australian premier, Hal Colebatch, had implemented quarantine restrictions, which caused a great amount of friction with Gardiner. Gardiner resigned as treasurer on 1 April 1919, although he remained in the Legislative Assembly as a backbencher. He finally resigned from parliament on 12 March 1921.

In 1922 Gardiner was interviewed at the Honorary Royal Commission into the effect of the Federal compact upon the finances and industries of Western Australia. During 1924 he was appointed as an advisor to the Commonwealth Royal Commission on the finances of Western Australia, as affected by Federation.

== Death ==
Following a three-year illness brought on by a stroke, he died on 27 October 1928 and was buried at Karrakatta Cemetery.
