= Henry Lefroy =

Australian politician (1854–1930)

The Honourable Sir Henry Lefroy KCMG
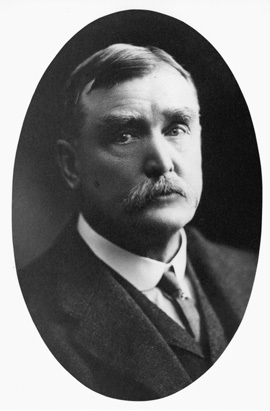

11th Premier of Western Australia
- In office 28 June 1917 – 17 April 1919
- Monarch: George V
- Governor: Sir William Ellison-Macartney
- Preceded by: Frank Wilson
- Succeeded by: Hal Colebatch

Member of the Legislative Assembly of Western Australia
- In office 2 August 1892 – 24 April 1901
- Preceded by: George Randell
- Succeeded by: Michael O'Connor
- Constituency: Moore
- In office 3 October 1911 – 12 March 1921
- Preceded by: None (seat recreated)
- Succeeded by: James Denton
- Constituency: Moore

Personal details
- Born: 24 March 1854 Perth, Western Australia
- Died: 19 March 1930 (aged 75) Walebing, Western Australia
- Party: Nationalist

Sir Henry Bruce Lefroy KCMG (24 March 1854 – 19 March 1930) was the eleventh Premier of Western Australia.

== Biography ==
Lefroy was born in Perth, Western Australia on 24 March 1854. His father was Anthony O'Grady Lefroy, Colonial Treasurer of Western Australia for over 30 years. Educated initially at Mrs McKnight's School in Perth; later he travelled to England, where he continued his studies at the Preparatory School at Exmouth, then at Elstree and finally at Rugby from 1868 to 1872. In 1893 Lefroy returned to Western Australia to take over management of his father's farm at Walebing, which he inherited upon his father's death in 1897. Lefroy was a member of the Victoria Plains Road Board from 1872 until 1899, and its chairman from 1876 to 1897. In 1874 he was appointed a Justice of the Peace, and he was for a time a member of the local Board of Education. He married Rose Agnes Wittenoom in Perth on 15 April 1880, and they had three sons and a daughter.

On 2 August 1892, Lefroy was elected to the Western Australian Legislative Assembly seat of Moore in a by-election. On 12 May 1897, he was appointed Minister for Education in John Forrest's government. He held this portfolio until 28 April 1898, when he instead became Minister for Mines. He did not contest the election of 24 April 1901, and so ceased to be a minister when parliament reconvened on 27 May.

From July 1901 until 1904, Lefroy was Agent-General for Western Australia in London. During his time in London, his first wife died on 17 April 1902. In 1903, he was appointed CMG, and on 23 November 1904, he married Madeleine Emily Stewart Walford in London. He had two sons and a daughter by his second wife.

After returning to Western Australia, Lefroy unsuccessfully contested the Metropolitan-Suburban Province in the Western Australian Legislative Council. He was again a member of the Victoria Plains Road Board from 1906 to 1909, and was then chairman of the Moora Roads Board from 1909 until 1917.

On 3 October 1911, Lefroy was again elected to the Legislative Assembly seat of Moore, after a hiatus of over ten years. In 1915, he replaced James Mitchell as deputy of the Liberal Party. He was appointed Minister for Lands and Agriculture in Frank Wilson's second government on 27 July 1916. Wilson's government had difficulty maintaining parliamentary support, and was put under pressure to try to repeat the success at federal level of Prime Minister Billy Hughes in forming a Nationalist Party. A Nationalist Party was formed in May 1917, but the party voted to reconstruct the ministry by caucus election. Recognising that the intention was to oust the present ministry, Wilson and three of his ministers walked out of the meeting. Lefroy remained, and was elected leader of the party. Wilson then had no choice but to resign as premier, and Lefroy became Premier of Western Australia on 28 June 1917.

Lefroy's entire ministry was elected by the whole parliamentary party, and it remains the only non-Labor government of Western Australia to be chosen in this way. It was an ill-assorted group, and consequently Lefroy's premiership was marked by infighting, factionalism and a lack of discipline. On one occasion a Royal Commission was announced without Lefroy's knowledge; and on another occasion the acting treasurer Robert Robinson accepted amendments to treasurer James Gardiner's budget against the wishes of other cabinet ministers. Lefroy was challenged for the leadership on 9 April 1919, and needed his own casting vote to survive because a number of his ministers declined to vote. When MacCallum Smith leaked this embarrassing information to the press, Lefroy resigned as premier and leader of the Nationalist Party on 17 April, and Hal Colebatch was elected in his place. Lefroy continued as member for Moore but was defeated at the general elections of 12 March 1921. He spent his remaining years at Walebing, dying there on 19 March 1930.

== General references ==
- Black, David (1 December 1981). "Party Politics in Turmoil". In C. T. Stannage (ed.). A New History of Western Australia. Nedlands: UWA Publishing. ISBN 0-85564-181-9. LCCN 82101009. OCLC 963830667. OL 3517729M. Wikidata Q125995168.
- Black, David; Bolton, Geoffrey (2001a). Biographical Register of Members of the Parliament of Western Australia. Vol. One: 1870–1930 (Revised ed.). Parliament House: Parliament of Western Australia. ISBN 0730738140.
- Reid, Gordon Stanley and Oliver, Margaret Ruth (1982). The Premiers of Western Australia 1890–1982. Nedlands, Western Australia: University of Western Australia Press. ISBN 0-85564-214-9.
- Serle, Percival (1949). "Lefroy, Henry". Dictionary of Australian Biography. Sydney: Angus & Robertson.
- The Constitution Centre of Western Australia (2002). Governors and Premiers of Western Australia. West Perth, Western Australia: The Constitution Centre of Western Australia. ISBN 0-7307-3821-3.
- Kimberly, W.B. (compiler) (1897). History of West Australia. A Narrative of her Past. Together With Biographies of Her Leading Men. Melbourne: F.W. Niven.

Preceded by Frank Wilson	Premier of Western Australia; 1917 – 1919	Succeeded by Hal Colebatch
