= Samuel James Phillips =

Australian politician

Samuel Phillips
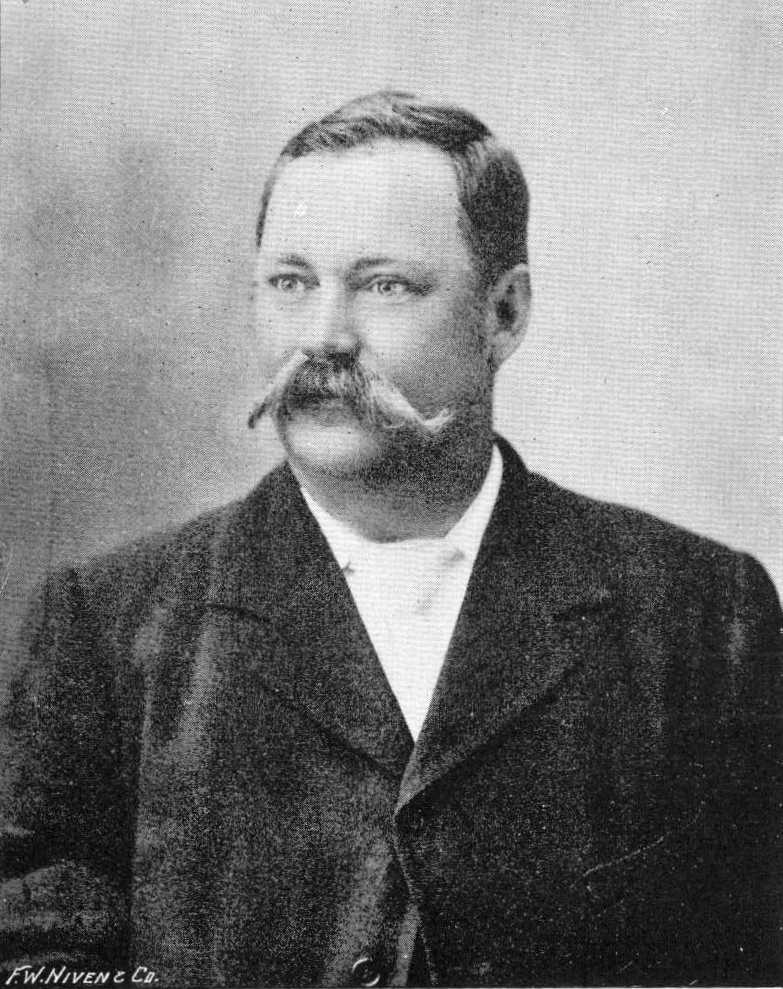

Member of the Legislative Assembly of Western Australia
- In office 27 November 1890 – 28 June 1904
- Succeeded by: Samuel Moore
- Constituency: Irwin

Personal details
- Born: 8 November 1855 Perth, Western Australia
- Died: 21 June 1920 (aged 64) Perth, Western Australia, Australia

Samuel James Phillips (8 November 1855 – 21 June 1920) was an Australian pastoralist and politician who was a member of the Legislative Assembly of Western Australia from 1890 to 1904, representing the seat of Irwin.

Phillips was born in Perth, to Sophia (née Roe) and Samuel Pole Phillips. His father was a pastoralist and long-serving member of the Legislative Council, while his maternal grandfather was John Septimus Roe, who was the first Surveyor-General of Western Australia. Phillips attended Bishop Hale's School in Perth, and then went to work on his father's property on the lower Irwin River. He eventually came to own several properties in the Gascoyne, including Jimba Jimba Station, Mount Augustus Station, Mount James Station, and Yandanooka Station. In 1883, he served as chairman of the Irwin Roads Board. At the 1890 general elections, the first to be held for the newly created Legislative Assembly, Phillips won the seat of Irwin. He was re-elected at the 1894, 1897, and 1901 elections, and retired at the 1904 election. Phillips died in Perth in June 1920, aged 64.

Parliament of Western Australia
New creation	Member for Irwin; 1890–1904	Succeeded by Samuel Moore
