= Mort Schell =

Australian politician

Member of the Legislative Assembly for Mount Marshall
- In office 8 February 1986 – 4 February 1989
- Preceded by: Bill McNee
- Succeeded by: seat abolished

Personal details
- Born: Morton William Schell; 13 July 1943 (age 83) Goomalling, Western Australia
- Party: National
- Education: Wesley College

Morton William "Mort" Schell (born 13 July 1943) is an Australian former politician who was a National Party member of the Legislative Assembly of Western Australia between 1986 and 1989, representing the seat of Mount Marshall.

Born in Goomalling, a small Wheatbelt town, to Winifred Lilia (née Kenworthy) and Roland William Schell, Schell was educated in Perth, boarding at Wesley College. He subsequently returned to Goomalling to farm, initially with his family and later independently, and also became involved with what is now the Western Australian Farmers Federation. He obtained a pilot's licence in 1966, and for several years worked as a commercial pilot and flying instructor based at Jandakot Airport. A former state secretary of the Young Country Party, and a member of each of the various iterations of the National Party, Schell was third on the Nationals' ticket for the Senate at the 1984 federal election. He successfully contested Mount Marshall at the 1986 state election, winning the seat off a sitting Liberal member, Bill McNee, on a nine-point swing. However, prior to the 1989 election, Mount Marshall was abolished in a redistribution, with Schell instead contesting the neighbouring Liberal-held seat of Moore. Bill McNee was also contesting Moore, replacing the retiring Bert Crane as the Liberal candidate, and defeated Schell's bid for re-election. After losing his seat in parliament, Schell became the owner and manager of the Joondalup franchise of Jetset, a travel agency.
