= Electoral district of Irwin =

Former electoral district of Western Australia (1890–1950)

Irwin Western Australia—Legislative Assembly
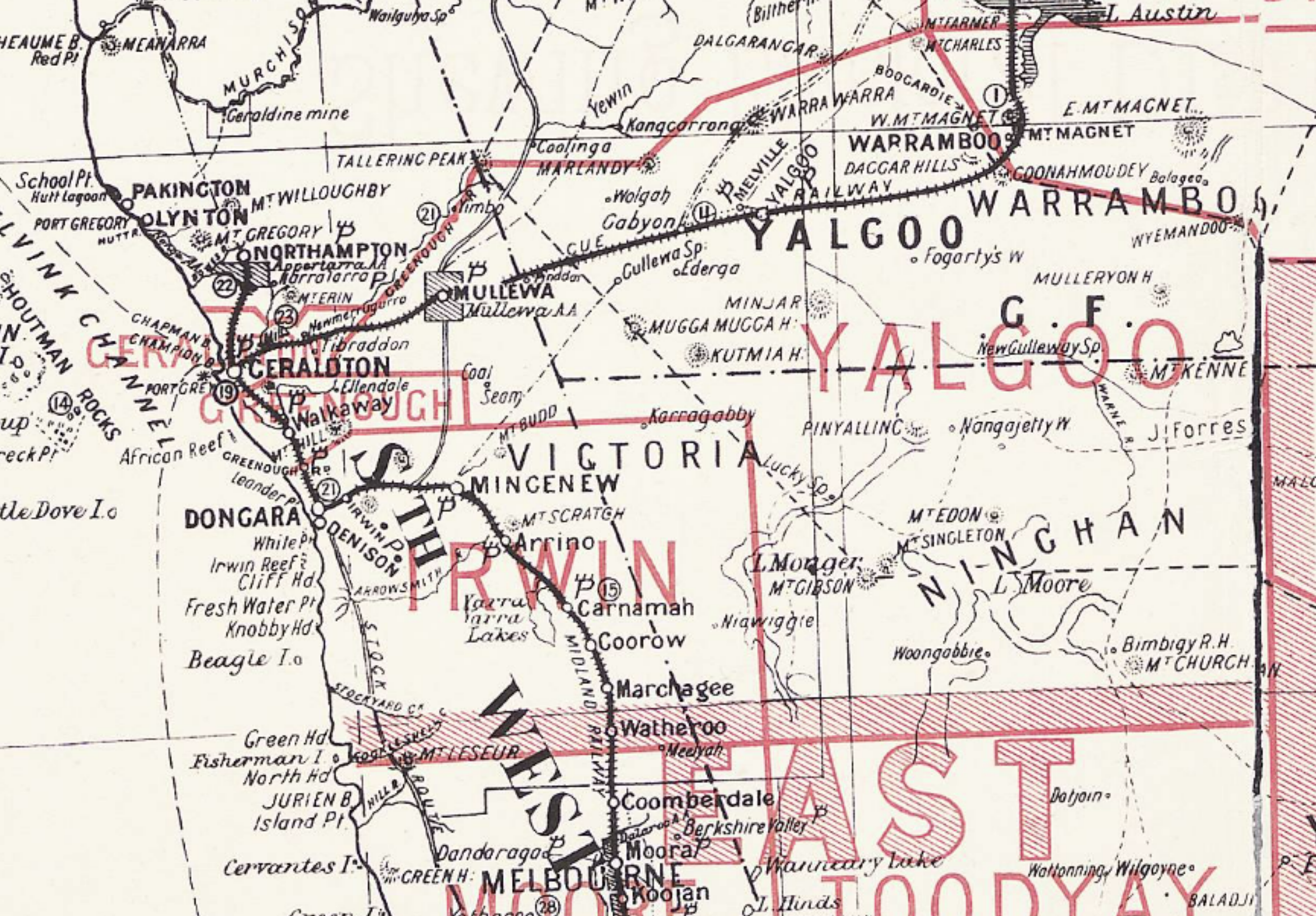
- Irwin and surrounds in 1898
- State: Western Australia
- Dates current: 1890–1950^{1}
- Namesake: Irwin River

Footnotes
- ^{1} known as Irwin-Moore 1930–1950

Irwin was an electoral district of the Legislative Assembly in the Australian state of Western Australia from 1890 to 1950.

Based in the state's Mid West agricultural region and centred on the town of Dongara, the district was one of the original 30 seats contested at the 1890 election. In 1898, it included Port Denison and a number of towns along the Midland railway, including Dongara, Irwin, Mingenew, Arrino, Carnamah, Coorow, Marchagee, and Watheroo. The district was renamed Irwin-Moore with the abolition of Moore at the 1930 election.

Irwin-Moore was abolished at the 1950 election and the seat of Moore recreated. Sitting member John Ackland of the Country Party successfully transferred to the new seat.

== Members ==
Irwin (1890–1930)
Member	Party	Term
Samuel J. Phillips	Ministerial	1890–1904
Samuel Moore	Ministerial	1904–1911
Samuel Moore	Liberal	1911–1914
James Gardiner	Country	1914–1921
Charles Maley	Country	1921–1923
Charles Maley	Country (MCP)	1923–1924
Charles Maley	Nationalist	1924–1928
Charles Maley	Country	1928–1929
Henry Maley	Country	1929–1930
Irwin-Moore (1930–1950)
Member	Party	Term
Percy Ferguson	Country	1930–1939
Claude Barker	Independent	1939
Horace Berry	Independent	1939–1947
John Ackland	Country	1947–1950
