= Bill McNee =

Australian politician (1933–2015)

William John McNee (28 April 1933 – 17 April 2015) was an Australian politician.

== Life and career ==
McNee was born in Wyalkatchem in Western Australia and was a farmer before entering politics. In 1983 he was elected to the Western Australian Legislative Assembly as the Liberal member for Mount Marshall. He was defeated in 1986 but returned in 1989 as the member for Moore. From 1990 to 1992 he was Shadow Minister for Transport and Fisheries and from 1992 to 1993 Shadow Minister for Water Resources; however, when the Liberal Party won government in 1993 he was demoted to Parliamentary Secretary assisting in Water Resources and Local Government, serving until 1997. McNee retired in 2005, and died on 17 April 2015, at the age of 81.

Western Australian Legislative Assembly
Preceded by Ray McPharlin	Member for Mount Marshall; 1983–1986	Succeeded by Mort Schell
Preceded by Bert Crane	Member for Moore; 1989–2005	Succeeded by Gary Snook
