= North Midlands Football League =

North Midlands; Football League
Established	1921
Teams	6
2026 premiers	Coorow-Latham
Most premiers	Mingenew (16)

The North Midlands Football League is an Australian rules football leagues based in Mid West (Western Australia).

The league was formed in 1921 as the North Midlands Football Association. The five founding teams were Three Springs, Carnamah, Arrino, Mingenew (not the current Mingenew club) and Yandanooka.

In 1926, Mingenew and Yandanooka merged to form Mingenew-Yandanooka. That club only lasted two seasons, and folded at the end of the 1927 season.

The league remained a four-club competition when Coorow joined in 1928. The league then remained unchanged until it went into recess in 1941 due to World War II.

The League recommenced in 1946 with the same four clubs, and continued until the end of the 1959 season. In 1960, the League was joined by two new clubs, Mingenew Rovers and Mingenew Wanderers, who were both playing in the Irwin Districts Football League until it disbanded at the end of the 1959 season. The two Mingenew clubs merged into the Mingenew club in 1961, which is the same Mingenew club playing today.

In 1963, the League reduced back to four teams when Arrino were no longer able to field a side.

In 1964, the nearby Perenjori-Morawa Football Association disbanded, and the six clubs from that competition merged into three new clubs and joined the North Midlands Football League. Morawa and Koolanooka merged to form Morawa (Tigers), Merkanooka and Gutha merged to form Morawa Rovers, and Caron and Perenjori merged to form Perenjori. The competition also changed name to the North Midlands Football League at that time.

Morawa Rovers disbanded at the end of the 1966 season, and its players were absorbed by Morawa (Tigers).

In 1968, Latham became the seventh club in the League, after joining from the disbanded Dalwallinu and Districts Football Association that went into recess at the end of 1967.

In 1971, the League returned to six teams following the merger of Coorow and Latham to form Coorow-Latham.

In 1981, Dongara joined from the Coastal Football Association. Dongara left the League in 1995 to join the Great Northern Football League, but re-joined from the 2000 season.

There are currently six clubs in the league coming from Dongara in the North, Perenjori in the East and Coorow in the South. The league's season consists of fifteen minor rounds and then a finals series based on the McIntyre system.

== Clubs ==
=== Locations ===
Locations of the North Midlands FL clubs

=== Current ===
Club	Colours	Nickname	Home Ground	Former League	Est.	Years in NMFL	NMFL Premierships	
Club	Colours	Nickname	Home Ground	Former League	Est.	Years in NMFL	Total	Years
Carnamah-Perenjori		Roos	Carnamah Sports Oval, Carnamah and Perenjori Oval, Perenjori	–	1995	1995–	3	2004, 2012, 2023
Coorow-Latham		Magpies	Maley Park, Coorow	–	1971	1971–	12	1972, 1975, 1976, 1982, 1986, 1993, 1995, 2006, 2021, 2022, 2024, 2026
Dongara		Eagles	Dongara Recreation Ground, Port Denison	CFA, GNFL	1974	1981–1994, 2000–	6	1990, 1991, 1994, 2008, 2016, 2019
Mingenew		Bulldogs	Mingenew Town Oval, Mingenew	–	1961	1961–	16	1964, 1979, 1983, 1989, 1997, 1998, 2001, 2002, 2003, 2007, 2009, 2010, 2013, 2014, 2015, 2017
Morawa		Tigers	Morawa Town Oval, Morawa	–	1964	1964–	14	1967, 1969, 1978, 1980, 1981, 1984, 1985, 1987, 1988, 1996, 2011, 2018, 2020, 2025
Three Springs		Bombers	Three Springs Oval, Three Springs	–	1903	1921–	15	1929, 1935, 1948, 1949, 1953, 1955, 1957, 1963, 1971, 1974, 1977, 1992, 1999, 2000, 2005

=== Former ===
Club	Colours	Nickname	Home Ground	Former League	Est.	Years in NMFL	NMFL Premierships		Fate
Club	Colours	Nickname	Home Ground	Former League	Est.	Years in NMFL	Total	Years	Fate
Arrino				–		1921–1962	11	1923, 1924, 1925, 1926, 1927, 1928, 1931, 1937, 1938, 1946, 1954	Folded after 1962 season
Carnamah		Blues	Carnamah Sports Oval, Carnamah	–		1921–1994	14	1922, 1930, 1932, 1933, 1934, 1936, 1939, 1951, 1958, 1960, 1961, 1962, 1970, 1973	Merged with Perenjori to form Carnamah-Perenjori in 1995
Coorow			Maley Park, Coorow	MFA		1928–1970	7	1940, 1947, 1950, 1952, 1956, 1956, 1959, 1965	Merged with Latham to form Coorow-Latham in 1971
Latham			Latham Oval, Latham	D&DFA		1968–1970	0	-	Merged with Coorow to form Coorow-Latham in 1971
Mingenew			Mingenew Town Oval, Mingenew	–		1921–1927	0	-	Folded three matches into 1927 due to lack of players
Mingenew Rovers		Rovers	Mingenew Town Oval, Mingenew	IDFL		1960	0	-	Merged with Mingenew Rovers to form Mingenew in 1961
Mingenew Wanderers		Wanderers	Mingenew Town Oval, Mingenew	IDFL		1960	0	-	Merged with Mingenew Rovers to form Mingenew in 1961
Mingenew-Yandanooka			Mingenew Town Oval, Mingenew	–	1927	1927	0	-	Folded in August 1927
Morawa Rovers		Rovers	Morawa Town Oval, Morawa	–	1964	1964–1966	1	1966	Folded in 1966
Perenjori	(1964-67) (1968-94)	Falcons	Perenjori Oval, Perenjori	–	1964	1964–1994	1	1968	Merged with Carnamah to form Carnamah-Perenjori in 1995
Yandanooka				–		1921–1926	1	1921	Folded in July 1926

== Grand final results ==
Year	Premiers	Score	Runners up	Score
1921	Yandanooka		Three Springs	
1922	Carnamah		Arrino	(3pts)
1923	Arrino	3.9 (27)	Three Springs	3.7 (25)
1924	Arrino	4.11 (35)	Yandanooka	4.4 (28)
1925	Arrino	6.3 (39)	Three Springs	3.6 (24)
1926	Arrino	3.6 (24)	Carnamah	3.4 (22)
1927	Arrino	7.9 (51)	Carnamah	5.7 (37)
1928	Arrino	8.4 (52)	Three Springs	4.6 (30)
1929	Three Springs	9.12 (66)	Arrino	5.7 (37)
1930	Carnamah	4.4 (28)	Three Springs	3.3 (21)
1931	Arrino	13.14 (92)	Carnamah	4.8 (32)
1932	Carnamah	11.12 (78)	Arrino	6.9 (45)
1933	Carnamah	6.13 (49)	Arrino	6.6 (42)
1934	Carnamah	7.10 (52)	Arrino	4.12 (36)
1935	Three Springs	11.13 (79)	Carnamah	8.11 (59)
1936	Carnamah	5.7 (37)	Arrino	4.9 (33)
1937	Arrino	13.18 (96)	Coorow	7.9 (51)
1938	Arrino	10.12 (72)	Three Springs	6.5 (41)
1939	Carnamah	11.7 (73)	Three Springs	8.9 (57)
1940	Coorow	6.7 (43)	Arrino	5.9 (39)
1946	Arrino	9.10 (64)	Coorow	6.8 (44)
1947	Coorow	11.15 (81)	Three Springs	8.9 (57)
1948	Three Springs	8.10 (58)	Arrino	6.3 (39)
1949	Three Springs	12.16 (88)	Coorow	4.8 (32)
1950	Coorow	11.13 (79)	Carnamah	6.6 (42)
1951	Carnamah	10.7 (67)	Coorow	7.19 (61)
1952	Coorow	11.13 (79)	Carnamah	7.10 (52)
1953	Three Springs	15.13 (103); 16.20 (116)	Carnamah	16.7 (103); 13.11 (89)
1954	Arrino	7.6 (48)	Three Springs	7.5 (47)
1955	Three Springs	9.7 (61)	Carnamah	6.8 (44)
1956	Coorow	11.13 (79)	Carnamah	8.8 (56)
1957	Three Springs	17.9 (111)	Carnamah	6.7 (43)
1958	Carnamah	23.15 (153)	Three Springs	7.8 (50)
1959	Coorow	11.14 (80)	Carnamah	10.3 (63)
1960	Carnamah	8.18 (66)	Coorow	4.14 (38)
1961	Carnamah	11.16 (82)	Coorow	9.10 (64)
1962	Carnamah	13.17 (95)	Three Springs	9.10 (64)
1963	Three Springs	13.8 (86)	Carnamah	11.15 (81)
1964	Mingenew	12.7 (79)	Morawa Rovers	11.7 (73)
1965	Coorow	12.9 (81)	Morawa Rovers	8.5 (53)
1966	Morawa Rovers	8.12 (60)	Perenjori	4.10 (34)
1967	Morawa	14.16 (100)	Coorow	9.9 (63)
1968	Perenjori	3.7 (25)	Three Springs	3.6 (24)
1969	Morawa	11.18 (84)	Three Springs	11.11 (77)
1970	Carnamah	13.8 (86)	Three Springs	7.12 (54)
1971	Three Springs	16.7 (103)	Coorow-Latham	5.9 (39)
1972	Coorow-Latham	8.8 (56)	Carnamah	6.10 (46)
1973	Carnamah	13.6 (84)	Coorow-Latham	8.14 (62)
1974	Three Springs	21.8 (134)	Coorow-Latham	14.9 (93)
1975	Coorow-Latham	14.21 (105)	Three Springs	9.10 (64)
1976	Coorow-Latham	13.12 (90)	Mingenew	8.13 (61)
1977	Three Springs	12.15 (87)	Coorow-Latham	8.16 (64)
1978	Morawa	20.16 (136)	Three Springs	19.14 (128)
1979	Mingenew	15.9 (99)	Morawa	4.28 (52)
1980	Morawa	14.14 (98)	Three Springs	9.11 (65)
1981	Morawa	22.13 (145)	Three Springs	13.12 (90)
1982	Coorow-Latham	23.19 (157)	Perenjori	9.12 (66)
1983	Mingenew	11.14 (80)	Coorow-Latham	8.8 (56)
1984	Morawa	15.15 (105)	Perenjori	8.12 (60)
1985	Morawa	9.24 (78); 17.25 (127)	Three Springs	11.12 (78); 5.12 (42)
1986	Coorow-Latham	11.13 (79)	Carnamah	7.12 (54)
1987	Morawa	20.11 (131)	Carnamah	9.19 (73)
1988	Morawa	22.12 (144)	Mingenew	12.12 (84)
1989	Mingenew	16.12 (108)	Dongara	13.15 (93)
1990	Dongara	15.10 (100)	Three Springs	11.2 (68)
1991	Dongara	10.18 (78)	Three Springs	4.4 (28)
1992	Three Springs	14.14 (98)	Morawa	6.10 (46)
1993	Coorow-Latham	16.13 (109)	Morawa	8.10 (58)
1994	Dongara	16.9 (105)	Coorow-Latham	11.14 (80)
1995	Coorow-Latham	12.16 (88)	Morawa	10.8 (68)
1996	Morawa	17.15 (117)	Three Springs	12.1 (73)
1997	Mingenew	13.20 (98)	Coorow-Latham	12.6 (78)
1998	Mingenew	13.11 (89)	Coorow-Latham	11.9 (75)
1999	Three Springs	15.14 (104)	Mingenew	5.12 (42)
2000	Three Springs	27.10 (172)	Coorow-Latham	2.11 (23)
2001	Mingenew	17.7 (109)	Coorow-Latham	12.13 (85)
2002	Mingenew	14.15 (99)	Three Springs	8.7 (55)
2003	Mingenew	16.12 (108)	Carnamah-Perenjori	11.8 (74)
2004	Carnamah-Perenjori	16.17 (113)	Mingenew	8.3 (51)
2005	Three Springs	16.5 (101)	Mingenew	13.19 (97)
2006	Coorow-Latham	12.15 (87)	Dongara	8.7 (55)
2007	Mingenew	12.18 (90)	Coorow-Latham	6.7 (43)
2008	Dongara	22.16 (148)	Three Springs	13.10 (88)
2009	Mingenew	14.12 (96)	Coorow-Latham	5.6 (36)
2010	Mingenew	12.9 (81)	Dongara	10.11 (71)
2011	Morawa	11.14 (80)	Mingenew	8.12 (60)
2012	Carnamah-Perenjori	9.16 (70)	Mingenew	8.12 (60)
2013	Mingenew	15.12 (102)	Morawa	11.3 (69)
2014	Mingenew	23.13 (151)	Dongara	9.7 (61)
2015	Mingenew	14.10 (94)	Three Springs	8.8 (56)
2016	Dongara	20.8 (128)	Mingenew	5.6 (36)
2017	Mingenew	8.12 (60)	Coorow-Latham	8.6 (54)
2018	Morawa	11.14 (80)	Three Springs	9.7 (61)
2019	Dongara	12.12 (84)	Morawa	9.8 (62)
2020	Morawa	12.18 (90)	Mingenew	10.6 (66)
2021	Coorow-Latham	15.10 (100)	Mingenew	11.14 (80)
2022	Coorow-Latham	16.10 (106)	Carnamah/Perenjori	8.12 (60)
2023	Carnamah-Perenjori	13.12 (90)	Three Springs	11.10 (76)
2024	Coorow-Latham	12.15 (87)	Dongara	10.15 (75)
2025	Morawa	13.3 (81)	Dongara	5.12 (42)
2026	Coorow-Latham	12.12 (84)	Carnamah/Perenjori	11.9 (75)

== Ladders ==
=== 2002 ladder ===
North Midlands	Wins	Byes	Losses	Draws	For	Against	%	Pts	Final	Team	G	B	Pts	Team	G	B	Pts
Mingenew	13	0	2	0	1518	829	183.11%	52	1st semi	Coorow/Latham	13	9	87	Morawa	9	11	65
Three Springs	9	0	6	0	1112	899	123.69%	36	2nd semi	Three Springs	9	9	63	Mingenew	9	8	62
Coorow/Latham	8	0	7	0	1063	969	109.70%	32	Preliminary	Mingenew	12	14	86	Coorow/Latham	9	10	64
Morawa	6	0	9	0	965	1221	79.03%	24	Grand	Mingenew	14	15	99	Three Springs	8	7	55
Carnamah/Perenjori	5	0	10	0	1076	1343	80.12%	20									
Dongara	4	0	11	0	916	1389	65.95%	16									

=== 2003 ladder ===
North Midlands	Wins	Byes	Losses	Draws	For	Against	%	Pts	Final	Team	G	B	Pts	Team	G	B	Pts
Carnamah/Perenjori	11	0	4	0	1530	767	199.48%	44	1st semi	Mingenew	12	6	78	Coorow/Latham	11	9	75
Three Springs	11	0	4	0	1268	822	154.26%	44	2nd semi	Carnamah/Perenjori	15	8	98	Three Springs	8	7	55
Mingenew	9	0	6	0	1433	933	153.59%	36	Preliminary	Mingenew	8	6	54	Three Springs	4	10	34
Coorow/Latham	9	0	6	0	1379	951	145.01%	36	Grand	Mingenew	16	12	108	Carnamah/Perenjori	11	8	74
Dongara	5	0	10	0	856	1521	56.28%	20									
Morawa	0	0	15	0	486	1958	24.82%	0									

=== 2004 ladder ===
North Midlands	Wins	Byes	Losses	Draws	For	Against	%	Pts	Final	Team	G	B	Pts	Team	G	B	Pts
Carnamah/Perenjori	14	0	1	0	2036	661	308.02%	56	1st semi	Mingenew	13	12	90	Coorow/Latham	13	7	85
Three Springs	10	0	5	0	1340	1144	117.13%	40	2nd semi	Carnamah/Perenjori	12	12	84	Three Springs	12	8	80
Coorow/Latham	7	0	8	0	1215	1174	103.49%	28	Preliminary	Mingenew	14	14	98	Three Springs	12	8	80
Mingenew	7	0	8	0	1189	1158	102.68%	28	Grand	Carnamah/Perenjori	16	17	113	Mingenew	8	3	51
Morawa	6	0	9	0	1218	1485	82.02%	24									
Dongara	1	0	14	0	506	1882	26.89%	4									

=== 2005 ladder ===
North Midlands	Wins	Byes	Losses	Draws	For	Against	%	Pts	Final	Team	G	B	Pts	Team	G	B	Pts
Mingenew	13	0	2	0	2052	706	290.65%	52	1st semi	Three Springs	14	11	95	Dongara	5	9	39
Carnamah/Perenjori	11	0	4	0	1418	977	145.14%	44	2nd semi	Mingenew	16	18	114	Carnamah/Perenjori	10	4	64
Three Springs	9	0	6	0	1471	907	162.18%	36	Preliminary	Three Springs	12	16	88	Carnamah/Perenjori	10	13	73
Dongara	8	0	7	0	1256	1323	94.94%	32	Grand	Three Springs	16	5	101	Mingenew	13	19	97
Morawa	3	0	12	0	862	1858	46.39%	12									
Coorow/Latham	1	0	14	0	674	1962	34.35%	4									

=== 2006 ladder ===
North Midlands	Wins	Byes	Losses	Draws	For	Against	%	Pts	Final	Team	G	B	Pts	Team	G	B	Pts
Coorow/Latham	13	0	2	0	1710	876	195.21%	52	1st semi	Dongara	21	8	134	Three Springs	6	12	48
Mingenew	11	0	4	0	2064	1211	170.44%	44	2nd semi	Coorow/Latham	21	15	141	Mingenew	6	4	40
Dongara	9	0	6	0	1767	1241	142.39%	36	Preliminary	Dongara	13	14	92	Mingenew	13	10	88
Three Springs	8	0	7	0	1467	1035	141.74%	32	Grand	Coorow/Latham	12	15	87	Dongara	8	7	55
Carnamah/Perenjori	3	0	12	0	877	2071	42.35%	12									
Morawa	1	0	14	0	873	2324	37.56%	4									

=== 2007 ladder ===
North Midlands	Wins	Byes	Losses	Draws	For	Against	%	Pts	Final	Team	G	B	Pts	Team	G	B	Pts
Mingenew	12	0	3	0	1647	1056	155.97%	48	1st semi	Dongara	20	17	137	Three Springs	13	6	84
Coorow/Latham	11	0	4	0	1523	795	191.57%	44	2nd semi	Mingenew	21	9	135	Coorow/Latham	13	7	85
Dongara	9	0	6	0	1293	975	132.62%	36	Preliminary	Coorow/Latham	13	10	88	Dongara	12	7	79
Three Springs	9	0	6	0	1429	1274	112.17%	36	Grand	Mingenew	12	18	90	Coorow/Latham	6	7	43
Carnamah/Perenjori	4	0	11	0	1068	1743	61.27%	16									
Morawa	0	0	15	0	866	1983	43.67%	0									

=== 2008 ladder ===
North Midlands	Wins	Byes	Losses	Draws	For	Against	%	Pts	Final	Team	G	B	Pts	Team	G	B	Pts
Dongara	15	0	0	0	2047	630	324.92%	60	1st semi	Coorow/Latham	11	15	81	Three Springs	11	19	85
Mingenew	11	0	4	0	1396	847	164.82%	44	2nd semi	Dongara	18	18	126	Mingenew	14	14	98
Coorow/Latham	8	0	7	0	1527	1132	134.89%	32	Preliminary	Three Springs	13	8	86	Mingenew	13	7	85
Three Springs	6	0	9	0	1079	1176	91.75%	24	Grand	Dongara	22	16	148	Three Springs	13	10	88
Morawa	4	0	11	0	673	1837	36.64%	16									
Carnamah/Perenjori	1	0	14	0	781	1881	41.52%	4									

=== 2009 ladder ===
North Midlands	Wins	Byes	Losses	Draws	For	Against	%	Pts	Final	Team	G	B	Pts	Team	G	B	Pts
Mingenew	12	0	3	0	1686	958	175.99%	48	1st semi	Carnamah/Perenjori	8	6	54	Three Springs	17	15	117
Coorow/Latham	9	0	6	0	1559	1220	127.79%	36	2nd semi	Mingenew	9	6	60	Coorow/Latham	13	15	93
Carnamah/Perenjori	8	0	7	0	1314	1462	89.88%	32	Preliminary	Mingenew	10	12	72	Three Springs	9	5	59
Three Springs	7	0	8	0	1384	1319	104.93%	28	Grand	Mingenew	14	12	96	Coorow/Latham	5	6	36
Dongara	5	0	10	0	1173	1641	71.48%	20									
Morawa	4	0	11	0	954	1470	64.90%	16									

=== 2010 ladder ===
North Midlands	Wins	Byes	Losses	Draws	For	Against	%	Pts	Final	Team	G	B	Pts	Team	G	B	Pts
Mingenew	13	0	2	0	1459	1035	140.97%	52	1st semi	Coorow/Latham	8	18	66	Morawa	7	5	47
Dongara	10	0	5	0	1389	1130	122.92%	40	2nd semi	Mingenew	18	15	123	Dongara	8	7	55
Coorow/Latham	8	0	7	0	1143	1304	87.65%	32	Preliminary	Dongara	18	9	117	Coorow/Latham	9	12	66
Morawa	8	0	7	0	1234	1131	109.11%	32	Grand	Mingenew	12	9	81	Dongara	10	11	71
Three Springs	5	0	10	0	1103	1320	83.56%	20									
Carnamah/Perenjori	1	0	14	0	1100	1508	72.94%	4									

=== 2011 ladder ===
North Midlands	Wins	Byes	Losses	Draws	For	Against	%	Pts	Final	Team	G	B	Pts	Team	G	B	Pts
Mingenew	14	0	1	0	1442	751	192.01%	56	1st semi	Carnamah/Perenjori	11	8	74	Dongara	8	16	64
Morawa	9	0	6	0	1410	869	162.26%	36	2nd semi	Morawa	17	13	115	Mingenew	12	8	80
Carnamah/Perenjori	8	0	7	0	1159	1070	108.32%	32	Preliminary	Mingenew	14	7	91	Carnamah/Perenjori	9	7	61
Dongara	7	0	8	0	1308	1323	98.87%	28	Grand	Morawa	11	14	80	Mingenew	8	12	60
Coorow/Latham	6	0	9	0	1051	1365	77.00%	24									
Three Springs	1	0	14	0	656	1648	39.81%	4									

=== 2012 ladder ===
North Midlands	Wins	Byes	Losses	Draws	For	Against	%	Pts	Final	Team	G	B	Pts	Team	G	B	Pts
Morawa	11	0	4	0	1696	875	193.83%	44	1st semi	Carnamah/Perenjori	16	7	103	Dongara	13	8	86
Mingenew	11	0	4	0	1584	953	166.21%	44	2nd semi	Mingenew	17	7	109	Morawa	14	7	91
Dongara	9	0	6	0	1422	1208	117.72%	36	Preliminary	Carnamah/Perenjori	10	12	72	Morawa	6	10	46
Carnamah/Perenjori	8	0	7	0	1475	1028	143.48%	32	Grand	Carnamah/Perenjori	9	16	70	Mingenew	8	12	60
Coorow/Latham	6	0	9	0	1141	1362	83.77%	24									
Three Springs	0	0	15	0	584	2476	23.59%	0									

=== 2013 ladder ===
North Midlands	Wins	Byes	Losses	Draws	For	Against	%	Pts	Final	Team	G	B	Pts	Team	G	B	Pts
Mingenew	14	0	1	0	2045	861	237.51%	56	1st semi	Coorow/Latham	9	7	61	Dongara	6	14	50
Morawa	11	0	4	0	1614	912	176.97%	44	2nd semi	Mingenew	16	19	115	Morawa	8	13	61
Dongara	8	0	7	0	1252	1359	92.13%	32	Preliminary	Morawa	12	9	81	Coorow/Latham	6	10	46
Coorow/Latham	6	0	9	0	1233	1201	102.66%	24	Grand	Mingenew	15	12	102	Morawa	11	3	69
Carnamah/Perenjori	4	0	11	0	981	1574	62.33%	16									
Three Springs	2	0	13	0	678	1896	35.76%	8									

=== 2014 ladder ===
North Midlands	Wins	Byes	Losses	Draws	For	Against	%	Pts	Final	Team	G	B	Pts	Team	G	B	Pts
Mingenew	15	0	0	0	1992	815	244.42%	60	1st semi	Dongara	24	18	162	Three Springs	15	4	94
Morawa	10	0	5	0	1577	859	183.59%	40	2nd semi	Mingenew	12	11	83	Morawa	11	11	77
Dongara	8	0	7	0	1285	1039	123.68%	32	Preliminary	Dongara	15	17	107	Morawa	15	12	102
Three Springs	6	0	9	0	1162	1349	86.14%	24	Grand	Mingenew	23	13	151	Dongara	9	7	61
Coorow/Latham	5	0	10	0	940	1520	61.84%	20									
Carnamah/Perenjori	1	0	14	0	510	1884	27.07%	4									

=== 2015 ladder ===
North Midlands	Wins	Byes	Losses	Draws	For	Against	%	Pts	Final	Team	G	B	Pts	Team	G	B	Pts
Mingenew	14	0	1	0	1769	826	214.16%	56	1st semi	Three Springs	13	24	102	Coorow/Latham	7	3	45
Dongara	12	0	3	0	1594	885	180.11%	48	2nd semi	Mingenew	14	10	94	Dongara	8	8	56
Three Springs	8	0	7	0	1584	1208	131.13%	32	Preliminary	Three Springs	15	10	100	Dongara	2	14	26
Coorow/Latham	7	0	8	0	1115	1196	93.23%	28	Grand	Mingenew	14	10	94	Three Springs	8	8	56
Morawa	4	0	11	0	1043	1320	79.02%	16									
Carnamah/Perenjori	0	0	15	0	481	2151	22.36%	0									

=== 2016 ladder ===
North Midlands	Wins	Byes	Losses	Draws	For	Against	%	Pts	Final	Team	G	B	Pts	Team	G	B	Pts
Dongara	15	0	0	0	2083	536	388.62%	60	1st semi	Mingenew	27	21	183	Three Springs	7	1	43
Morawa	11	0	4	0	1785	808	220.92%	44	2nd semi	Dongara	10	10	70	Morawa	7	12	54
Mingenew	10	0	5	0	1692	850	199.06%	40	Preliminary	Mingenew	20	10	130	Morawa	14	7	91
Three Springs	5	0	10	0	967	1745	55.42%	20	Grand	Dongara	20	8	128	Mingenew	5	6	36
Coorow/Latham	2	0	13	0	734	1737	42.26%	8									
Carnamah/Perenjori	2	0	13	0	500	2115	23.64%	8									

=== 2017 ladder ===
North Midlands	Wins	Byes	Losses	Draws	For	Against	%	Pts	Final	Team	G	B	Pts	Team	G	B	Pts
Dongara	11	0	3	0	1594	736	216.58%	44	1st semi	Coorow/Latham	12	10	82	Morawa	11	11	77
Mingenew	10	0	4	0	1796	859	209.08%	40	2nd semi	Mingenew	17	6	108	Dongara	11	11	77
Morawa	10	0	4	0	1502	836	179.67%	40	Preliminary	Coorow/Latham	15	12	102	Dongara	8	12	60
Coorow/Latham	8	0	6	0	1311	1077	121.73%	32	Grand	Mingenew	8	12	60	Coorow/Latham	8	6	54
Three Springs	2	0	12	0	564	1838	30.69%	8									
Carnamah/Perenjori	1	0	13	0	518	1939	26.71%	4									
