= Charles Maley =

Australian politician (1876–1929)

Member of the Legislative Assembly of Western Australia
- In office 12 March 1921 – 15 October 1929
- Preceded by: James Gardiner
- Succeeded by: Henry Maley
- Constituency: Irwin

Personal details
- Born: 28 August 1876 Greenough, Western Australia, Australia
- Died: 15 October 1929 (aged 53) West Perth, Western Australia, Australia
- Party: Country (to 1924); Nationalist (1924–1929); Country (from 1929)

Charles Crowther Maley (28 August 1876 – 15 October 1929) was an Australian businessman, farmer, and politician. who was a Country Party member of the Legislative Assembly of Western Australia from 1921 until his death, representing the seat of Irwin.

== Early life ==
Maley was born in Greenough, Western Australia, to Elizabeth (née Waldeck) and John Stephen Maley. His sister was the wholemeal enthusiast and Temperance campaigner Mary Martha Farrelly.

He was named after Charles Crowther, a local MP and friend of his father. Maley was sent to school in Fremantle, and then returned to Greenough to manage his father's farm. During the gold rush, he moved to Lawlers (a remote mining town), where at various times he owned a hotel, managed a brewery, and served a term on the local road board.

In 1907, Maley and his brothers took up land at Three Springs, which had only just been opened to settlement. He moved there permanently in 1911, and subsequently bought out his brothers' shares in the property. Maley served several terms on the Upper Irwin Road Board (known as the Mingenew Road Board from 1919), and was also involved in the establishment of the North Midlands Football Association, donating a cup for its inaugural season in 1921.

== Politics and later life ==
At the 1921 state election, Maley ran successfully for the Country Party in the seat of Irwin. His younger brother, Henry Maley, had won the seat of Greenough at the 1917 election, and served as the Country Party's leader from 1922 to 1923. The Country Party split into two opposing factions in 1923, and both brothers joined the Ministerialist faction, which supported the government of James Mitchell. Charles and several other ex-Country MPs joined the Nationalist Party after the 1924 state election, but his brother was defeated.

Maley was re-elected as a Nationalist in 1927, but in March 1929 rejoined the Country Party. He died at his residence in West Perth in October 1929, after a brief illness. The by-election occasioned by his death was won by his brother, who held it for less than a year before losing it at the 1930 state election. Maley had married Sarah Teresa McKeefrey (née O'Toole) in 1909. They had no children together, and separated in 1927 after he was caught in bed with a barmaid. They never formally divorced, although she received half of their assets in a settlement.

== See also ==
- Members of the Western Australian Legislative Assembly

Parliament of Western Australia
Preceded by James Gardiner	Member for Irwin; 1921–1929	Succeeded by Henry Maley
