= Edgar Lewis (politician) =

Australian politician

The Honourable Edgar Lewis

Deputy Leader of the Country Party in Western Australia
- In office February 1962 – March 1971
- Preceded by: Crawford Nalder
- Succeeded by: Ray McPharlin

Member of the Legislative Assembly of Western Australia
- In office 20 September 1958 – 30 March 1974
- Preceded by: John Ackland
- Succeeded by: Bert Crane
- Constituency: Moore

Personal details
- Born: 12 February 1902 Fremantle, Western Australia, Australia
- Died: 26 April 1992 (aged 90) Doubleview, Western Australia, Australia
- Party: Country

Edgar Henry Mead Lewis (12 February 1902 – 26 April 1992) was an Australian politician who was a Country Party member of the Legislative Assembly of Western Australia from 1958 to 1974, representing the seat of Moore.

Lewis was born in Fremantle, and attended Fremantle Boys' School. He left school at an early age to work as a farmhand, and in 1924 he and his brother purchased their own property at Miling. They eventually acquired another three farms, and Lewis became a member of various farming industry groups (including a director of what is now Wesfarmers). He was elected to the Moora Road Board in 1936, serving until 1939. Lewis entered parliament at the 1958 Moore by-election, which had been caused by the death of the sitting member, John Ackland. In February 1962, following the retirement of the Country Party leader, Arthur Watts, he was elected to replace Crawford Nalder (the new leader) as deputy leader of the party. Lewis was consequently elevated to the ministry, becoming Minister for Education and Minister for Electricity. A few months later, he was also appointed Minister for Native Welfare (following George Cornell's resignation), although Crawford Nalder took over his electricity portfolio.

As native welfare minister, Lewis began the removal of prohibitions on Indigenous Australians drinking alcohol, at a time "when the climate was almost universally anti-Aboriginal" and the changes were opposed by white rural constituents. Drinking rights were initially granted in the South West and then expanded to all regions except the Kimberley and the Eastern Goldfields; the remaining restrictions were abolished by the ALP following a change of government in 1971. He subsequently announced that he regretted his decision, stating "I have no doubt in my mind that none of them have benefited physically or morally - and certainly not financially". Lewis remained in the ministry until the government's defeat at the 1971 state election, and afterward was replaced as deputy leader by Ray McPharlin. He left parliament at the 1974 election, and retired to Perth, where he died in 1992, aged 90.

Parliament of Western Australia
Preceded by John Ackland	Member for Moore; 1958–1974	Succeeded by Bert Crane
Political offices
Preceded by Arthur Watts	Minister for Education; 1962–1971	Succeeded by John Tonkin
Preceded by Arthur Watts	Minister for Electricity; 1962	Succeeded by Crawford Nalder
Preceded by George Cornell	Minister for Native Welfare; 1962–1971	Abolished
