= Michael O'Connor (Australian politician) =

Australian politician

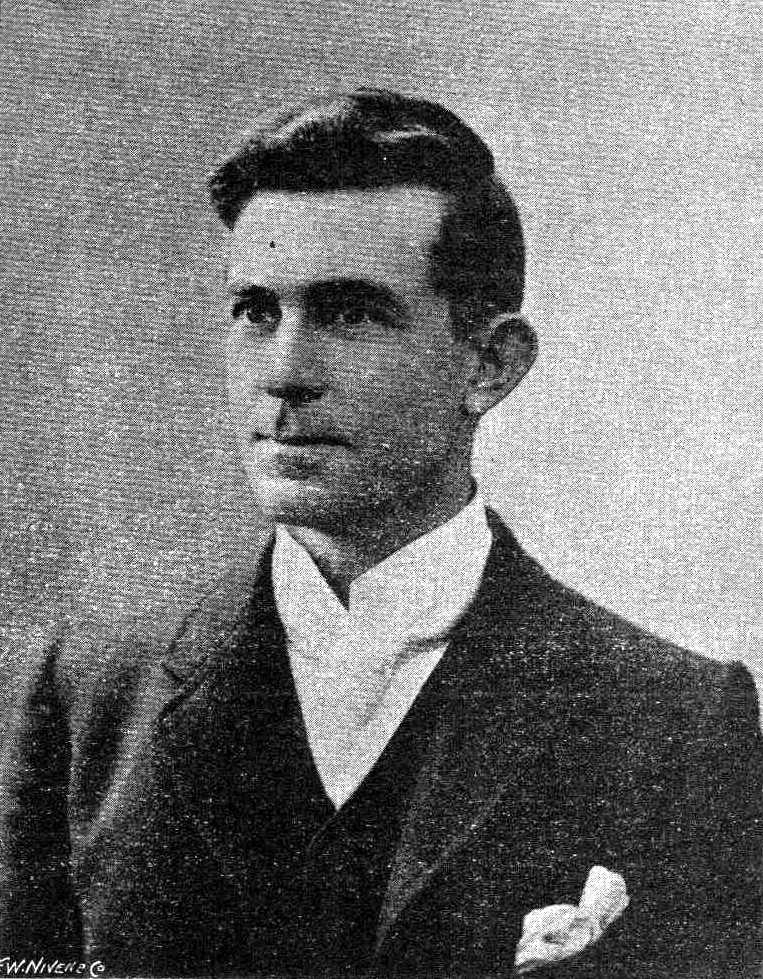
Michael O'Connor

Michael O'Connor (11 November 1865 – 6 July 1940) was an Irish-Australian Member of the Western Australian Legislative Assembly from 1901 to 1904.

== Early life ==
Born in Newcastle (now Toodyay), Western Australia, on 11 November 1865, Michael O'Connor was the son of Daniel Connor, a former convict who had become one of the wealthiest men in the colony. His use of a different surname vis-à-vis that of his father is believed to be an attempt to obscure his convict origins, which was at that time a substantial social stigma.

As a youth O'Connor was a prominent cricket and polo player, and was captain of the Perth Polo Club. He was educated privately in Western Australia, then sent for further education in Ireland, where he attended Clongowes Wood College of Jesuits in County Kildare, and Trinity College in Dublin. O'Connor attained his medical degrees in 1889, and the following year returned to Western Australia. In 1891 he established a practice in Perth. From 1893 he was the health officer for the metro district; he held the position during Perth's April 1893 epidemic of smallpox. By 1896 he was senior physician at Perth Public Hospital (now Royal Perth Hospital), and physician and superintendent at the Victoria Hospital in Subiaco. In July of that year he married Beatrice Margaret Mary Forbes; they had four children.

== Career ==
On 11 July 1899, O'Connor contested the seat of East Province in the Western Australian Legislative Council, but was unsuccessful. His decision to enter politics may have been influenced by his sister's husband Timothy Quinlan, who had been a Member of the Western Australian Legislative Assembly since 1890. On 24 April 1901, O'Connor was elected to the Legislative Assembly seat of Moore. He held the seat until the election of 26 June 1904, which he did not contest.

== Late life and death ==
O'Connor was widowed in December 1905. From 1907, he was a consulting physician to Perth Hospital. He also became a member of the hospital board, and was chairman of directors of the Emu Brewery and Stanley Brewing Company. Little is known of his later life. He died on 6 July 1940, and was buried in Karrakatta Cemetery.
