= Gary Snook =

Australian politician

- In office 26 February 2005 – 6 September 2008
- Preceded by: William McNee
- Succeeded by: Grant Woodhams
- Constituency: Moore

Personal details
- Born: 21 October 1947 (age 78) Perth Western Australia
- Party: Liberal
- Spouse: Kim

Gary Snook (born 21 October 1947) was a Liberal member of the Western Australian Legislative Assembly from February 2005 to September 2008 representing the electorate of Moore

Raised on the family farm in the shire of Dalwallinu he attended the local primary school (Buntine Primary) before completing his secondary education at Guildford Grammar School.

In January 2008 Snook was appointed as the shadow minister of Agriculture, Food and Local government.

The seat of Moore was amalgamated with Greenough for the 2008 election and Snook contested the seat with the sitting member of Greenough, the Nationals Party candidate Grant Woodhams.
