= Claude Barker =

Australian politician

Claude Osmonde Barker (1897 – 1961) was an Australian politician. He was the Independent member for Irwin-Moore in the Western Australian Legislative Assembly from 18 March to 2 August 1939, when he resigned.

== Early life ==
Barker was born on 12 February 1896 in Wyndham, New Zealand. He was the son of Mary Ellen Josephine (née Sharcoe) and Benjamin Barker; his father was a musician and music teacher.

According to a profile published in The West Australian in 1939, Barker was raised by his grandfather John Jameson on the Otago Goldfields.

== Politics ==
Barker was elected to the Western Australian Legislative Assembly at the 1939 state election, winning the seat of Irwin-Moore as an independent. He resigned from parliament on 2 August 1939 without taking his seat, shortly before he was due to be sworn in as a member. Barker publicly attributed his resignation to his desire to transfer to federal politics and endorsed Len Hamilton as his successor. He also alleged that political opponents had spread false rumours about his background, including that he had a criminal history.

In September 1940, Country Party MP Lindsay Thorn alleged under parliamentary privilege that Barker had an extensive criminal record in New Zealand prior to moving to Australia and had in fact been ineligible to serve as a member of parliament. Thorn had received a letter from New Zealand detailing that a man with the same name as Barker had been convicted of various offences in the late 1910s and early 1920s, including theft and cheque fraud, and had served over three years in prison.

== Personal life ==
Barker had four children with his first wife, Ruby Ethel McLachlan, whom he married in Albury, New South Wales, in either 1926 or 1927. He remarried in 1940 to Lilah Keast (née Beaton), with whom he had another two children.
