= Bert Crane =

Australian politician

Member of the Legislative Assembly of Western Australia
- In office 30 March 1974 – 4 February 1989
- Preceded by: Edgar Lewis
- Succeeded by: Bill McNee
- Constituency: Moore

Personal details
- Born: 27 January 1923 Galle, Ceylon
- Died: 16 August 2003 (aged 80) Maylands, Western Australia, Australia
- Party: National Country (Note: The party was known as the National Alliance at the 1974 state election, a consequence of the merger of the former Country Party with the Democratic Labor Party.) (to 1985); Liberal (from 1985)

Albert Victor "Bert" Crane (27 January 1923 – 16 August 2003) was an Australian politician who was a member of the Legislative Assembly of Western Australia from 1974 to 1989, representing the seat of Moore. He represented the National Country Party (NCP) until 1985, and then the Liberal Party.

Crane was born in Galle, Ceylon (present-day Sri Lanka), to Lavina May Victoria (née Beer) and Arthur Albert Crane. As a child, he lived in England for a period and then in Victoria, eventually arriving in Western Australia in 1926. His parents had a property at Bindi Bindi, a small Wheatbelt town, and he attended school there before going on to Geraldton High School. In 1942, Crane enlisted in the Royal Australian Navy. During the war, he initially served as a signalman at Albany, but was later posted to HMAS Horsham. Crane returned to Bindi Bindi after the war's end, and a few years later purchased his own farm. Prominent in agricultural circles, and also a supporter of the Australian League of Rights in the early 1970s, he was elected to parliament at the 1974 state election, replacing the retiring Edgar Lewis in the seat of Moore.

In August 1975, Crane was appointed deputy chairman of committees in the Legislative Assembly. In 1978, several National Country MPs had left the party to form a new group, the National Party of Western Australia. Crane remained with the National Country Party, which continued to govern in coalition with the Liberal Party (under Sir Charles Court and Ray O'Connor) until Labor's victory at the 1983 state election. The NCP and the National Party merged in October 1984 (under the name of the latter), although the parliamentary NCP was not formally dissolved until January 1985. Its three remaining members in the Legislative Assembly, Crane, Dick Old, and Peter Jones, refused to join the new unified party, instead joining the Liberal Party. At the 1986 state election, Crane easily won re-election as a Liberal, although Old and Jones lost their seats. He left parliament at the 1989 election, and afterward retired to Perth, dying there in August 2003, aged 80.
