= John Ackland (politician) =

Australian politician

- Constituency: Irwin-Moore, Moore

Personal details
- Born: 21 August 1890 Mitcham, South Australia
- Died: 29 July 1958 (aged 67) Wongan Hills, Western Australia
- Party: Country Party
- Spouse: Elsie Edith Coomer
- Profession: Farmer

John Hugh Ackland (21 August 1890 – 29 July 1958) was an Australian politician, and a member of the Western Australian Legislative Assembly from 1947 until 1958 representing the seats of Irwin-Moore and Moore.

== Biography ==
Ackland was born in Mitcham, Adelaide, South Australia, to John Barnes Ackland, a warehouse manager, and Edith Ackland (née Randell). In 1896, the family moved to Western Australia, and he was educated at state schools in East Perth, Claremont and Northam before attending Scotch College. He obtained work as a jackaroo for Thomas Wilding at Mokine in 1906–1908, and from then on farmed at family properties. In 1910, he selected land at Lake Ninan near Wongan Hills, which became productive. During this time he became a member of the town's Board of Health, and on 21 December 1914, he married Elsie Edith Coomer with whom he was to have two sons.

With the onset of World War I, Ackland was enlisted into the Australian Imperial Force on 16 August 1916, and served in France as a private with the 28th Battalion, although acted as a Corporal and Lance Corporal at various times. He was wounded in battle on 5 June 1918, and was on secondment to the Agent-General for Western Australia's office in London prior to discharge on 25 November 1919.

After his war service, Ackland returned to Lake Ninan, and became a Justice of the Peace in 1922 and was elected to the Melbourne Road Board the following year. In 1927, he became its chairman, a position he would hold until 1940. He was also a member of the Royal Agricultural Show Council, was vice-president of the Wheat Section of the Primary Producers Association (associated with the Country Party) and was an early director of Co-operative Bulk Handling. From 1940 to 1945, he served as a captain in the Volunteer Defence Corps.

Shortly after his return to civilian life, Ackland contested the seat of Irwin-Moore in the Western Australian Legislative Assembly for the Country Party at the 1947 election, and won against the incumbent Independent member Horace Berry. He retained the seat three years later when it was renamed Moore. He served on several Select Committees, including one into the agricultural practices of Eric Fairleigh in 1951, and the uniformity of liquid fuel prices in 1956; he also became a member of the Joint House Committee in 1956. He represented the Western Australian branch at the Commonwealth Parliamentary Association at its general conference in Ottawa, Canada, in 1982.

Ackland died suddenly after giving a speech at Wongan Hills Junior High School on 29 July 1958, and was cremated at Karrakatta Cemetery. He has a memorial inscription at Wongan Hills cemetery.

Parliament of Western Australia
Preceded by Horace Berry	Member for Moore; 1947–1958	Succeeded by Edgar Lewis
