= Samuel Joseph Fortescue Moore =

Australian politician

Samuel Joseph Fortescue Moore MLA

Member of the Western Australian Legislative Assembly for Irwin
- In office 24 June 1904 – 21 October 1914

Personal details
- Born: 3 April 1846 Oakover, Middle Swan, Western Australia
- Died: 9 May 1921 (aged 75) Claremont, Western Australia
- Resting place: Karrakatta Cemetery

Samuel Joseph Fortescue Moore (1846-1921) was an Australian politician. He was a member of the Western Australian Legislative Assembly representing Irwin from his election on 24 June 1904 until the end of his term on 21 October 1914. Moore was a member of the Western Australian Liberal Party. Before that, he was a member and chairman of the Greenough Road Board and a member and chairman of the Claremont Road Board.
