= Percy Ferguson =

Australian politician

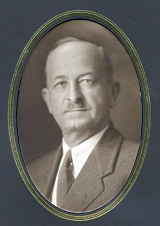

Member of the Western Australian Legislative Assembly

Personal details
- Died: Mount Lawley
- Citizenship: British; Australian
- Party: Country

Percy Douglas Ferguson (23 January 1880 – 2 June 1952) was an Australian politician. He was a Country Party member of the Western Australian Legislative Assembly from 1927 to 1939, representing Moore until 1930 and Irwin-Moore thereafter. He served as Minister for Agriculture from 1930 to 1933 in the coalition government led by Sir James Mitchell.
