= Electoral district of Moore =

State electoral district of Western Australia

Moore Western Australia—Legislative Assembly
- Interactive map of district boundaries from the 2021 state election to 2025
- State: Western Australia
- Dates current: 1890–1904; 1911–1930; 1950–2025
- MP: Shane Love
- Party: National
- Namesake: Moore River
- Electors: 26,014 (2021)
- Area: 77,632 km^{2} (29,973.9 sq mi)
- Demographic: Rural
Electorates around Moore:
Indian Ocean	North West Central	North West Central
Indian Ocean; Geraldton	Moore	Central Wheatbelt
Indian Ocean	Swan Hills; Wanneroo; Butler	Central Wheatbelt

Moore was an electoral district of the Legislative Assembly in the Australian state of Western Australia.

Moore has had three incarnations as an electorate. In its first incarnation, Moore was one of the original 30 seats contested at the 1890 colonial election.

Its latest incarnation it has existed continuously since 1950. In that time, the seat has been variously held by the two conservative forces in Western Australian politics: the Liberal Party and the National Party. The seat has never been won by the Labor Party.

== Geography ==
Moore is a coastal district, covering an expanse of rural territory to the north of Perth and surrounding but not including the regional city of Geraldton. The district includes the towns of Kalbarri, Northampton, Nabawa, Mullewa, Dongara, Irwin, Mingenew, Morawa, Three Springs, Perenjori, Carnamah, Eneabba, Leeman, Coorow, Jurien Bay, Cervantes, Badgingarra, Dandaragan, Moora, Dalwallinu, Lancelin, Ledge Point, Guilderton, Gingin, Bindoon, Calingiri and Toodyay.

== History ==
Moore's most famous member was Henry Lefroy, Premier of Western Australia from 1917 to 1919.

Electoral reform ahead of the 2008 state election necessitated an increase in the enrolment of non-metropolitan districts. This meant that the district of Greenough was abolished, with Moore taking in most of its former territory and voters. This pitted the National member for Greenough, Grant Woodhams, against the Liberal member for Moore, Gary Snook, with Woodhams emerging the victor.

On 1 December 2023 the Western Australian Electoral Commission merged the seats of Moore and North West Central into the new seat of Mid-West. At the 2025 election, this will pit the National member for Moore, Shane Love, against the former National turned Liberal member for North West Central Merome Beard.

== Members for Moore ==
Moore (1890–1904)
Member	Party	Term
George Randell	Unaligned	1890–1892
Henry Lefroy	Ministerial	1892–1901
Michael O'Connor	Ministerial	1901–1904
Moore (1911–1930)
Member	Party	Term
Henry Lefroy	Liberal	1911–1917
Henry Lefroy	Nationalist	1917–1921
James Denton	Country	1921–1923
James Denton	Country (MCP)	1923–1924
James Denton	Nationalist	1924–1927
Percy Ferguson	Country	1927–1930
Moore (1950–present)
Member	Party	Term
John Ackland	Country	1950–1958
Edgar Lewis	Country	1958–1974
Bert Crane	Country	1974–1975
Bert Crane	National Country	1975–1985
Bert Crane	Liberal	1985–1989
Bill McNee	Liberal	1989–2005
Gary Snook	Liberal	2005–2008
Grant Woodhams	National	2008–2013
Shane Love	National	2013–2025

== Election results ==
2021 Western Australian state election: Moore
Party	Candidate	Votes	%	±%
National	Shane Love	8,353	38.0	+1.1
Labor	Barni Norton	7,432	33.8	+13.9
Liberal	Darren Slyns	3,701	16.8	−2.0
Shooters, Fishers, Farmers	Ross Williamson	984	4.5	−1.3
Greens	Brian Spittles	638	2.9	−1.0
One Nation	Ian Frizzell	579	2.6	−10.1
No Mandatory Vaccination	T. Asmutaitis	233	1.1	+1.1
WAxit	Richard Banka	86	0.4	+0.4
Total formal votes		22,006	96.3	+0.3
Informal votes		855	3.7	−0.3
Turnout		22,861	87.9	−3.6
Two-candidate-preferred result
National	Shane Love	12,870	58.5	−6.3
Labor	Barni Norton	9,132	41.5	+41.5
National hold				
