= Results of the 1956 Western Australian state election (Legislative Assembly) =

Western Australian state election, 7 April 1956 Legislative Assembly << 1953–1959 >>
Enrolled voters	262,384				
Votes cast	241,863		Turnout	92.18	–1.30
Informal votes	6,851		Informal	2.83	+0.22
Summary of votes by party
Party	Primary votes	%	Swing	Seats	Change
Labor	116,793	49.70	–0.07	29	+ 3
Liberal and Country	98,335	33.13	–4.82	11	– 4
Country	12,319	5.24	+0.33	8	– 1
Ind. Lib.	15,822	6.73	+4.89	2	+ 2
Communist	1,167	0.50	–0.22	0	± 0
Independent	11,045	4.70	–0.10	0	± 0
Total	241,863			50	

This is a list of electoral district results of the 1956 Western Australian election.

== Results by electoral district ==
=== Albany ===
1956 Western Australian state election: Albany
Party	Candidate	Votes	%	±%
Labor	Jack Hall	2,302	45.6	
Country	Leonard Hill	1,748	34.7	
Country	Alfred Gulvin	994	19.7	
Total formal votes		5,044	98.6	
Informal votes		73	1.4	
Turnout		5,117	93.6	
Two-party-preferred result
Labor	Jack Hall	2,531	50.2	
Country	Leonard Hill	2,513	49.8	
Labor gain from Country		Swing		

=== Avon Valley ===
1956 Western Australian state election: Avon Valley
Party	Candidate	Votes	%	±%
Liberal and Country	James Mann	2,746	62.1	
Country	John Stratton	1,679	37.9	
Total formal votes		4,425	96.6	
Informal votes		155	3.4	
Turnout		4,580	91.6	
Liberal and Country hold		Swing		

=== Beeloo ===
1956 Western Australian state election: Beeloo
Party	Candidate	Votes	%	±%
Labor	Colin Jamieson	6,418	66.8	
Liberal and Country	John Alden	3,186	33.2	
Total formal votes		9,604	96.8	
Informal votes		316	3.2	
Turnout		9,920	93.0	
Labor hold		Swing		

=== Blackwood ===
1956 Western Australian state election: Blackwood
Party	Candidate	Votes	%	±%
Liberal and Country	John Hearman	unopposed		
Liberal and Country hold		Swing		

=== Boulder ===
1956 Western Australian state election: Boulder
Party	Candidate	Votes	%	±%
Labor	Arthur Moir	unopposed		
Labor hold		Swing		

=== Bunbury ===
1956 Western Australian state election: Bunbury
Party	Candidate	Votes	%	±%
Liberal and Country	George Roberts	2,754	50.9	
Labor	Charles Webber	2,655	49.1	
Total formal votes		5,409	99.1	
Informal votes		49	0.9	
Turnout		5,458	97.1	
Liberal and Country gain from Labor		Swing		

=== Canning ===
1956 Western Australian state election: Canning
Party	Candidate	Votes	%	±%
Labor	Bill Gaffy	4,825	51.1	
Liberal and Country	Richard Marris	4,615	48.9	
Total formal votes		9,440	98.4	
Informal votes		157	1.6	
Turnout		9,597	93.8	
Labor hold		Swing		

=== Claremont ===
1956 Western Australian state election: Claremont
Party	Candidate	Votes	%	±%
Liberal and Country	Harold Crommelin	3,239	41.5	
Liberal and Country	Laurence Snook	2,618	33.5	
Liberal and Country	Charles North	1,948	25.0	
Total formal votes		7,805	93.5	
Informal votes		541	6.5	
Turnout		8,346	91.2	
Two-candidate-preferred result
Liberal and Country	Harold Crommelin	4,295	55.0	
Liberal and Country	Laurence Snook	3,510	45.0	
Liberal and Country hold		Swing		

=== Collie ===
1956 Western Australian state election: Collie
Party	Candidate	Votes	%	±%
Labor	Harry May	3,415	74.5	
Country	Norman Coote	1,048	22.9	
Communist	Norman Lacey	120	2.6	
Total formal votes		4,583	98.3	
Informal votes		80	1.7	
Turnout		4,663	94.3	
Two-party-preferred result
Labor	Harry May		76.9	
Country	Norman Coote		23.1	
Labor hold		Swing		

- Two party preferred vote was estimated.

=== Cottesloe ===
1956 Western Australian state election: Cottesloe
Party	Candidate	Votes	%	±%
Liberal and Country	Ross Hutchinson	5,781	68.0	
Independent	Leonard Stratton	2,717	32.0	
Total formal votes		8,498	97.0	
Informal votes		259	3.0	
Turnout		8,757	92.0	
Liberal and Country hold		Swing		

=== Dale ===
1956 Western Australian state election: Dale
Party	Candidate	Votes	%	±%
Liberal and Country	Gerald Wild	2,911	56.7	
Independent	Ivan Locke	2,221	43.3	
Total formal votes		5,132	97.2	
Informal votes		146	2.8	
Turnout		5,278	92.6	
Liberal and Country hold		Swing		

=== Darling Range ===
1956 Western Australian state election: Darling Range
Party	Candidate	Votes	%	±%
Country	Ray Owen	unopposed		
Country hold		Swing		

=== East Perth ===
1956 Western Australian state election: East Perth
Party	Candidate	Votes	%	±%
Labor	Herb Graham	5,273	65.8	
Liberal and Country	Edmund Madigan	2,739	34.2	
Total formal votes		8,012	97.8	
Informal votes		180	2.2	
Turnout		8,192	89.4	
Labor hold		Swing		

=== Eyre ===
1956 Western Australian state election: Eyre
Party	Candidate	Votes	%	±%
Labor	Emil Nulsen	unopposed		
Labor hold		Swing		

=== Fremantle ===
1956 Western Australian state election: Fremantle
Party	Candidate	Votes	%	±%
Labor	Joseph Sleeman	7,395	91.2	
Communist	Paddy Troy	714	8.8	
Total formal votes		8,109	95.9	
Informal votes		344	4.1	
Turnout		8,453	89.5	
Labor hold		Swing		

=== Gascoyne ===
1956 Western Australian state election: Gascoyne
Party	Candidate	Votes	%	±%
Labor	Daniel Norton	1,068	69.7	
Liberal and Country	Kenneth Illingworth	465	30.3	
Total formal votes		1,533	97.8	
Informal votes		35	2.2	
Turnout		1,568	84.4	
Labor hold		Swing		

=== Geraldton ===
1956 Western Australian state election: Geraldton
Party	Candidate	Votes	%	±%
Labor	Bill Sewell	3,052	59.9	
Liberal and Country	Arnold Devlin	1,014	19.9	
Country	Charles Eadon-Clarke	995	19.5	
Independent	Joyce Webber	33	0.7	
Total formal votes		5,094	98.6	
Informal votes		71	1.4	
Turnout		5,165	91.7	
Two-party-preferred result
Labor	Bill Sewell		62.2	
Liberal and Country	Arnold Devlin		37.8	
Labor hold		Swing		

- Two party preferred vote was estimated.

=== Greenough ===
1956 Western Australian state election: Greenough
Party	Candidate	Votes	%	±%
Liberal and Country	David Brand	unopposed		
Liberal and Country hold		Swing		

=== Guildford-Midland ===
1956 Western Australian state election: Guildford-Midland
Party	Candidate	Votes	%	±%
Labor	John Brady	8,108	94.0	
Communist	Albert Marks	516	6.0	
Total formal votes		8,624	95.3	
Informal votes		429	4.7	
Turnout		9,053	92.1	
Labor hold		Swing		

=== Harvey ===
1956 Western Australian state election: Harvey
Party	Candidate	Votes	%	±%
Liberal and Country	Iven Manning	unopposed		
Liberal and Country hold		Swing		

=== Kalgoorlie ===
1956 Western Australian state election: Kalgoorlie
Party	Candidate	Votes	%	±%
Labor	Tom Evans	3,052	70.5	
Liberal and Country	George Brand	1,276	29.5	
Total formal votes		4,328	98.2	
Informal votes		78	1.8	
Turnout		4,406	92.8	
Labor hold		Swing		

=== Katanning ===
1956 Western Australian state election: Katanning
Party	Candidate	Votes	%	±%
Country	Crawford Nalder	unopposed		
Country hold		Swing		

=== Kimberley ===
1956 Western Australian state election: Kimberley
Party	Candidate	Votes	%	±%
Labor	John Rhatigan	unopposed		
Labor hold		Swing		

=== Leederville ===
1956 Western Australian state election: Leederville
Party	Candidate	Votes	%	±%
Labor	Ted Johnson	4,353	50.8	
Liberal and Country	Les Nimmo	4,217	49.2	
Total formal votes		8,570	98.3	
Informal votes		144	1.7	
Turnout		8,714	93.8	
Labor hold		Swing		

=== Maylands ===
1956 Western Australian state election: Maylands
Party	Candidate	Votes	%	±%
Labor	Merv Toms	4,989	56.4	
Liberal and Country	Ellen Lulham	2,050	23.2	
Independent Liberal	Herbert R. Robinson	1,803	20.4	
Total formal votes		8,842	97.7	
Informal votes		206	2.3	
Turnout		9,048	93.4	
Two-party-preferred result
Labor	Merv Toms		58.5	
Liberal and Country	Ellen Lulham		41.5	
Labor gain from Liberal and Country		Swing		

- Two party preferred vote was estimated.

=== Melville ===
1956 Western Australian state election: Melville
Party	Candidate	Votes	%	±%
Labor	John Tonkin	6,837	76.2	
Independent	James Hart	2,132	23.8	
Total formal votes		8,969	97.0	
Informal votes		279	3.0	
Turnout		9,248	93.5	
Labor hold		Swing		

=== Merredin-Yilgarn ===
1956 Western Australian state election: Merredin-Yilgarn
Party	Candidate	Votes	%	±%
Labor	Lionel Kelly	2,818	57.4	
Country	Alfred Walker	1,206	24.6	
Liberal and Country	Robert Loder	887	18.1	
Total formal votes		4,911	98.4	
Informal votes		80	1.6	
Turnout		4,991	93.0	
Two-party-preferred result
Labor	Lionel Kelly		59.2	
Country	Alfred Walker		40.8	
Labor hold		Swing		

- Two party preferred vote was estimated.

=== Middle Swan ===
1956 Western Australian state election: Middle Swan
Party	Candidate	Votes	%	±%
Labor	James Hegney	unopposed		
Labor hold		Swing		

=== Moore ===
1956 Western Australian state election: Moore
Party	Candidate	Votes	%	±%
Country	John Ackland	unopposed		
Country hold		Swing		

=== Mount Hawthorn ===
1956 Western Australian state election: Mount Hawthorn
Party	Candidate	Votes	%	±%
Labor	Bill Hegney	5,740	63.0	
Liberal and Country	William Bailey	3,032	33.3	
Communist	William Anear	333	3.7	
Total formal votes		9,105	96.1	
Informal votes		367	3.9	
Turnout		9,472	92.8	
Two-party-preferred result
Labor	Bill Hegney		66.3	
Liberal and Country	William Bailey		33.7	
Labor hold		Swing		

=== Mount Lawley ===
1956 Western Australian state election: Mount Lawley
Party	Candidate	Votes	%	±%
Independent Liberal	Edward Oldfield	6,242	67.8	
Liberal and Country	Arthur Abbott	2,965	32.2	
Total formal votes		9,207	95.0	
Informal votes		480	5.0	
Turnout		9,687	93.9	
Independent Liberal gain from Liberal and Country		Swing		

=== Mount Marshall ===
1956 Western Australian state election: Mount Marshall
Party	Candidate	Votes	%	±%
Country	George Cornell	unopposed		
Country hold		Swing		

=== Murchison ===
1956 Western Australian state election: Murchison
Party	Candidate	Votes	%	±%
Labor	Everard O'Brien	2,064	59.1	
Liberal and Country	Carlyle Newman	1,430	40.9	
Total formal votes		3,494	97.2	
Informal votes		102	2.8	
Turnout		3,596	85.1	
Labor hold		Swing		

=== Murray ===
1956 Western Australian state election: Murray
Party	Candidate	Votes	%	±%
Liberal and Country	Ross McLarty	unopposed		
Liberal and Country hold		Swing		

=== Narrogin ===
1956 Western Australian state election: Narrogin
Party	Candidate	Votes	%	±%
Labor	Percy Munday	1,412	28.8	
Country	Bill Robinson	1,049	21.4	
Country	William Manning	1,047	21.4	
Liberal and Country	Robert Farr	1,017	20.8	
Country	Frank Ashworth	373	7.6	
Total formal votes		4,898	98.1	
Informal votes		93	1.9	
Turnout		4,991	93.1	
Two-party-preferred result
Country	William Manning	3,209	65.5	
Labor	Percy Munday	1,689	34.5	
Country hold		Swing		

=== Nedlands ===
1956 Western Australian state election: Nedlands
Party	Candidate	Votes	%	±%
Liberal and Country	Charles Court	6,037	72.9	
Independent Liberal	David Grayden	2,249	27.1	
Total formal votes		8,286	96.8	
Informal votes		277	3.2	
Turnout		8,563	91.2	
Liberal and Country hold		Swing		

=== North Perth ===
1956 Western Australian state election: North Perth
Party	Candidate	Votes	%	±%
Labor	Stan Lapham	4,424	54.3	
Liberal and Country	Leslie Fawcett	3,720	45.7	
Total formal votes		8,144	97.4	
Informal votes		220	2.6	
Turnout		8,364	92.1	
Labor hold		Swing		

=== Northam ===
1956 Western Australian state election: Northam
Party	Candidate	Votes	%	±%
Labor	Albert Hawke	3,483	76.4	
Independent Liberal	James Collins	1,075	23.6	
Total formal votes		4,558	97.9	
Informal votes		96	2.1	
Turnout		4,654	91.5	
Labor hold		Swing		

=== Pilbara ===
1956 Western Australian state election: Pilbara
Party	Candidate	Votes	%	±%
Labor	Alec Rodoreda	662	66.9	
Liberal and Country	Rowland Charlton	327	33.1	
Total formal votes		989	98.7	
Informal votes		13	1.3	
Turnout		1,002	81.3	
Labor hold		Swing		

=== Roe ===
1956 Western Australian state election: Roe
Party	Candidate	Votes	%	±%
Country	Charles Perkins	unopposed		
Country hold		Swing		

=== South Fremantle ===
1956 Western Australian state election: South Fremantle
Party	Candidate	Votes	%	±%
Labor	Dick Lawrence	7,042	76.3	
Independent Labor	Michael Robson	2,191	23.7	
Total formal votes		9,233	96.2	
Informal votes		369	3.8	
Turnout		9,602	90.4	
Labor hold		Swing		

=== South Perth ===
1956 Western Australian state election: South Perth
Party	Candidate	Votes	%	±%
Labor	Francis French	3,615	38.8	
Liberal and Country	James Smith	2,523	27.1	
Independent Liberal	Bill Grayden	2,482	26.6	
Independent	Cole Sangster	704	7.6	
Total formal votes		9,324	98.0	
Informal votes		191	2.0	
Turnout		9,515	93.4	
Two-candidate-preferred result
Independent Liberal	Bill Grayden	5,437	58.3	
Labor	Francis French	3,887	41.7	
Independent Liberal gain from Liberal and Country		Swing		

=== Stirling ===
1956 Western Australian state election: Stirling
Party	Candidate	Votes	%	±%
Country	Arthur Watts	unopposed		
Country hold		Swing		

=== Subiaco ===
1956 Western Australian state election: Subiaco
Party	Candidate	Votes	%	±%
Labor	Percival Potter	4,134	47.3	
Liberal and Country	Edgar Paddick	2,486	28.4	
Independent Liberal	Joseph Abrahams	1,791	20.5	
Independent Liberal	Walter Richardson	336	3.8	
Total formal votes		8,747	97.3	
Informal votes		242	2.7	
Turnout		8,989	92.2	
Two-party-preferred result
Labor	Percival Potter	4,520	51.7	
Liberal and Country	Edgar Paddick	4,227	48.3	
Labor gain from Liberal and Country		Swing		

=== Toodyay ===
1956 Western Australian state election: Toodyay
Party	Candidate	Votes	%	±%
Country	Lindsay Thorn	2,180	50.7	
Independent Labor	John Rolinson	2,117	49.3	
Total formal votes		4,297	97.7	
Informal votes		103	2.3	
Turnout		4,400	88.9	
Country hold		Swing		

=== Vasse ===
1956 Western Australian state election: Vasse
Party	Candidate	Votes	%	±%
Liberal and Country	William Bovell	unopposed		
Liberal and Country hold		Swing		

=== Victoria Park ===
1956 Western Australian state election: Victoria Park
Party	Candidate	Votes	%	±%
Labor	Hugh Andrew	5,663	62.2	
Liberal and Country	Benjamin Marshall	3,444	37.8	
Total formal votes		9,107	97.8	
Informal votes		209	2.2	
Turnout		9,316	92.8	
Labor hold		Swing		

=== Warren ===
1956 Western Australian state election: Warren
Party	Candidate	Votes	%	±%
Labor	Ernest Hoar	unopposed		
Labor hold		Swing		

=== Wembley Beaches ===
1956 Western Australian state election: Wembley Beaches
Party	Candidate	Votes	%	±%
Labor	Frederick Marshall	5,492	49.5	
Liberal and Country	Bertha Beecroft	4,158	37.5	
Independent Liberal	Sydney Cheek	919	8.3	
Independent	Les Laracy	531	4.8	
Total formal votes		11,100	97.7	
Informal votes		255	2.3	
Turnout		11,355	95.0	
Two-party-preferred result
Labor	Frederick Marshall		51.9	
Liberal and Country	Bertha Beecroft		48.1	
Labor gain from Liberal and Country		Swing		

=== West Perth ===
1956 Western Australian state election: West Perth
Party	Candidate	Votes	%	±%
Labor	Stanley Heal	4,385	57.8	
Liberal and Country	Raymond Nowland	3,206	42.2	
Total formal votes		7,591	97.3	
Informal votes		212	2.7	
Turnout		7,803	88.7	
Labor hold		Swing		

== See also ==
- 1956 Western Australian state election
- Candidates of the 1956 Western Australian state election
- Members of the Western Australian Legislative Assembly, 1956–1959
