= Results of the 1959 Western Australian state election (Legislative Assembly) =

Western Australian state election, 21 March 1959 Legislative Assembly << 1956–1962 >>
Enrolled voters	292,596^{[1]}				
Votes cast	269,322		Turnout	92.05%	–0.13%
Informal votes	6,937		Informal	2.58%	–0.26%
Summary of votes by party
Party	Primary votes	%	Swing	Seats	Change
Labor	117,861	44.92%	–4.78%	23	– 6
Liberal and Country	98,335	37.48%	+4.34%	17	+ 6
Country	17,179	6.55%	+1.31%	8	± 0
Democratic Labor	13,436	5.12%	+5.12%	0	± 0
Ind. Lib.	10,008	3.81%	–2.92%	2	± 0
Communist	2,216	0.84%	+0.35%	0	± 0
Independent	3,350	1.28%	–3.42%	0	± 0
Total	262,385			50	

This is a list of electoral district results of the 1959 Western Australian election.

== Results by electoral district ==
=== Albany ===
1959 Western Australian state election: Albany
Party	Candidate	Votes	%	±%
Labor	Jack Hall	3,041	53.8	+8.2
Liberal and Country	Roy Wellington	1,199	21.2	+21.2
Country	Vincent Liddelow	1,007	17.8	−16.9
Independent	Charles Johnson	345	6.1	+6.1
Independent	Ernest Rogers	63	1.1	+1.1
Total formal votes		5,655	98.3	−0.3
Informal votes		98	1.7	+0.3
Turnout		5,753	95.1	+1.5
Two-party-preferred result
Labor	Jack Hall		59.2	+9.0
Liberal and Country	Roy Wellington		40.8	+40.8
Labor hold		Swing	+9.0	

- Two party preferred vote was estimated.

=== Avon Valley ===
1959 Western Australian state election: Avon Valley
Party	Candidate	Votes	%	±%
Liberal and Country	James Mann	2,712	60.6	−1.5
Country	John Stratton	1,761	39.4	+1.5
Total formal votes		4,473	97.7	+1.1
Informal votes		106	2.3	−1.1
Turnout		4,579	93.3	+1.7
Liberal and Country hold		Swing	−1.5	

=== Beeloo ===
1959 Western Australian state election: Beeloo
Party	Candidate	Votes	%	±%
Labor	Colin Jamieson	6,067	52.3	−14.5
Liberal and Country	Gordon Clark	4,798	41.4	+8.2
Democratic Labor	Patrick Riordan	735	6.3	+6.3
Total formal votes		11,600	97.3	+0.5
Informal votes		326	2.7	−0.5
Turnout		11,926	92.4	−0.6
Two-party-preferred result
Labor	Colin Jamieson		53.3	−13.5
Liberal and Country	Gordon Clark		46.7	+13.5
Labor hold		Swing	−13.5	

- Two party preferred vote was estimated.

=== Blackwood ===
1959 Western Australian state election: Blackwood
Party	Candidate	Votes	%	±%
Liberal and Country	John Hearman	2,239	50.8	−49.2
Country	Duncan Muir	2,168	49.2	+49.2
Total formal votes		4,407	97.6	
Informal votes		110	2.4	
Turnout		4,517	92.7	
Liberal and Country hold		Swing	N/A	

=== Boulder ===
1959 Western Australian state election: Boulder
Party	Candidate	Votes	%	±%
Labor	Arthur Moir	unopposed		
Labor hold		Swing		

=== Bunbury ===
1959 Western Australian state election: Bunbury
Party	Candidate	Votes	%	±%
Liberal and Country	George Roberts	3,337	54.0	+3.1
Labor	Forrest Hay	2,847	46.0	−3.1
Total formal votes		6,184	99.0	−0.1
Informal votes		64	1.0	+0.1
Turnout		6,248	95.7	−1.4
Liberal and Country hold		Swing	+3.1	

=== Canning ===
1959 Western Australian state election: Canning
Party	Candidate	Votes	%	±%
Liberal and Country	Des O'Neil	6,514	51.0	+2.1
Labor	Bill Gaffy	5,161	40.4	−10.7
Democratic Labor	Michael O'Brien	1,087	8.5	+8.5
Total formal votes		12,762	98.6	+0.2
Informal votes		178	1.4	−0.2
Turnout		12,940	93.4	−0.4
Two-party-preferred result
Liberal and Country	Des O'Neil		58.2	+9.3
Labor	Bill Gaffy		41.8	−9.3
Liberal and Country gain from Labor		Swing	+9.3	

- Two party preferred vote was estimated.

=== Claremont ===
1959 Western Australian state election: Claremont
Party	Candidate	Votes	%	±%
Liberal and Country	Harold Crommelin	unopposed		
Liberal and Country hold		Swing		

=== Collie ===
1959 Western Australian state election: Collie
Party	Candidate	Votes	%	±%
Labor	Harry May	3,290	71.1	−3.4
Independent	Norman Coote	1,335	28.9	+28.9
Total formal votes		4,625	98.8	+0.5
Informal votes		56	1.2	−0.5
Turnout		4,681	95.0	+0.7
Labor hold		Swing	N/A	

=== Cottesloe ===
1959 Western Australian state election: Cottesloe
Party	Candidate	Votes	%	±%
Liberal and Country	Ross Hutchinson	5,058	59.9	−8.1
Labor	Edmund Edwards	3,379	40.1	+40.1
Total formal votes		8,437	98.8	+1.8
Informal votes		99	1.2	−1.8
Turnout		8,536	92.2	+0.2
Liberal and Country hold		Swing	N/A	

=== Dale ===
1959 Western Australian state election: Dale
Party	Candidate	Votes	%	±%
Liberal and Country	Gerald Wild	2,626	45.4	−11.3
Country	Arthur Mills	1,450	25.1	+25.1
Independent Labor	William Williams	1,054	18.2	+18.2
Country	Andrew McPhail	653	11.3	+11.3
Total formal votes		5,783	96.8	−0.4
Informal votes		188	3.2	+0.4
Turnout		5,971	93.6	+1.0
Two-candidate-preferred result
Liberal and Country	Gerald Wild	3,065	53.0	−3.7
Country	Arthur Mills	2,718	47.0	+47.0
Liberal and Country hold		Swing	N/A	

=== Darling Range ===
1959 Western Australian state election: Darling Range
Party	Candidate	Votes	%	±%
Country	Ray Owen	1,799	38.8	−61.2
Liberal and Country	John Kostera	1,389	30.0	+30.0
Labor	Henry Harris	1,211	26.1	+26.1
Democratic Labor	Michael Coyne	236	5.1	+5.1
Total formal votes		4,635	98.0	
Informal votes		94	2.0	
Turnout		4,729	91.5	
Two-candidate-preferred result
Country	Ray Owen	2,803	60.5	−39.5
Liberal and Country	John Kostera	1,832	39.5	+39.5
Country hold		Swing	N/A	

=== East Perth ===
1959 Western Australian state election: East Perth
Party	Candidate	Votes	%	±%
Labor	Herb Graham	3,557	49.6	−16.2
Liberal and Country	John Martin	2,835	39.6	+5.4
Democratic Labor	John Deane	773	10.8	+10.8
Total formal votes		7,165	97.8	0.0
Informal votes		163	2.2	0.0
Turnout		7,328	89.2	−0.2
Two-party-preferred result
Labor	Herb Graham	3,818	53.3	−12.5
Liberal and Country	John Martin	3,347	46.7	+12.5
Labor hold		Swing	−12.5	

=== Eyre ===
1959 Western Australian state election: Eyre
Party	Candidate	Votes	%	±%
Labor	Emil Nulsen	2,685	68.9	−31.1
Liberal and Country	Orlando Stuart	1,214	31.1	+31.1
Total formal votes		3,899	99.2	
Informal votes		31	0.8	
Turnout		3,930	87.0	
Labor hold		Swing	N/A	

=== Fremantle ===
1959 Western Australian state election: Fremantle
Party	Candidate	Votes	%	±%
Labor	Harry Fletcher	5,389	69.7	−21.5
Democratic Labor	Henry Miller	1,981	25.6	+25.6
Communist	Paddy Troy	367	4.7	−4.1
Total formal votes		7,737	95.6	−0.3
Informal votes		356	4.4	+0.3
Turnout		8,093	89.6	+0.1
Labor hold		Swing	N/A	

- Preferences were not distributed.

=== Gascoyne ===
1959 Western Australian state election: Gascoyne
Party	Candidate	Votes	%	±%
Labor	Daniel Norton	1,080	70.8	+1.1
Liberal and Country	Thomas Orr	446	29.2	−1.1
Total formal votes		1,526	98.8	+1.0
Informal votes		19	1.2	−1.0
Turnout		1,545	87.1	+2.7
Labor hold		Swing	+1.1	

=== Geraldton ===
1959 Western Australian state election: Geraldton
Party	Candidate	Votes	%	±%
Labor	Bill Sewell	3,257	59.9	0.0
Liberal and Country	Gerald Throssell	1,778	32.7	+12.8
Democratic Labor	Septimus Waldon	399	7.3	+7.3
Total formal votes		5,434	99.1	+0.5
Informal votes		50	0.9	−0.5
Turnout		5,484	91.3	−0.4
Two-party-preferred result
Labor	Bill Sewell		61.0	−1.2
Liberal and Country	Gerald Throssell		39.0	+1.2
Labor hold		Swing	−1.2	

- Two party preferred vote was estimated.

=== Greenough ===
1959 Western Australian state election: Greenough
Party	Candidate	Votes	%	±%
Liberal and Country	David Brand	unopposed		
Liberal and Country hold		Swing		

=== Guildford-Midland ===
1959 Western Australian state election: Guildford-Midland
Party	Candidate	Votes	%	±%
Labor	John Brady	7,689	94.0	0.0
Communist	John Gandini	493	6.0	0.0
Total formal votes		8,182	90.8	−4.5
Informal votes		824	9.2	+4.5
Turnout		9,006	92.6	+0.5
Labor hold		Swing	0.0	

=== Harvey ===
1959 Western Australian state election: Harvey
Party	Candidate	Votes	%	±%
Liberal and Country	Iven Manning	unopposed		
Liberal and Country hold		Swing		

=== Kalgoorlie ===
1959 Western Australian state election: Kalgoorlie
Party	Candidate	Votes	%	±%
Labor	Tom Evans	3,038	70.2	−0.3
Liberal and Country	Percy Millington	817	18.9	−10.6
Independent	Harold Illingworth	476	11.0	+11.0
Total formal votes		4,331	98.8	+0.6
Informal votes		52	1.2	−0.6
Turnout		4,383	92.5	−0.3
Two-party-preferred result
Labor	Tom Evans		75.6	+5.1
Liberal and Country	Percy Millington		24.4	−5.1
Labor hold		Swing	+5.1	

- Two party preferred vote was estimated.

=== Katanning ===
1959 Western Australian state election: Katanning
Party	Candidate	Votes	%	±%
Country	Crawford Nalder	unopposed		
Country hold		Swing		

=== Kimberley ===
1959 Western Australian state election: Kimberley
Party	Candidate	Votes	%	±%
Labor	John Rhatigan	650	64.0	−36.0
Liberal and Country	Nolan McDaniel	366	36.0	+36.0
Total formal votes		1,016	97.6	
Informal votes		25	2.4	
Turnout		1,041	75.2	
Labor hold		Swing	N/A	

=== Leederville ===
1959 Western Australian state election: Leederville
Party	Candidate	Votes	%	±%
Liberal and Country	Guy Henn	3,991	46.5	−2.7
Labor	Ted Johnson	3,497	40.8	−10.0
Democratic Labor	John Antill	1,089	12.7	+12.7
Total formal votes		8,577	98.2	−0.1
Informal votes		158	1.8	+0.1
Turnout		8,735	94.3	+0.5
Two-party-preferred result
Liberal and Country	Guy Henn	4,951	57.7	+8.5
Labor	Ted Johnson	3,626	42.3	−8.5
Liberal and Country gain from Labor		Swing	+8.5	

=== Maylands ===
1959 Western Australian state election: Maylands
Party	Candidate	Votes	%	±%
Labor	Merv Toms	5,299	58.2	+1.8
Liberal and Country	Walter Bonnett	3,802	41.8	+18.6
Total formal votes		9,296	97.9	+0.2
Informal votes		195	2.1	−0.2
Turnout		9,296	93.5	+0.1
Labor hold		Swing	−0.3	

=== Melville ===
1959 Western Australian state election: Melville
Party	Candidate	Votes	%	±%
Labor	John Tonkin	unopposed		
Labor hold		Swing		

=== Merredin-Yilgarn ===
1959 Western Australian state election: Merredin-Yilgarn
Party	Candidate	Votes	%	±%
Labor	Lionel Kelly	3,388	72.3	+14.9
Liberal and Country	Ronald Lee	1,299	27.7	+9.6
Total formal votes		4,687	97.4	−1.0
Informal votes		123	2.6	+1.0
Turnout		4,810	91.0	−2.0
Labor hold		Swing	+13.1	

=== Middle Swan ===
1959 Western Australian state election: Middle Swan
Party	Candidate	Votes	%	±%
Labor	James Hegney	5,364	55.4	−44.6
Liberal and Country	Francis Wilson	3,699	38.2	+38.2
Democratic Labor	Brian Peachey	623	6.4	+6.4
Total formal votes		9,686	97.9	
Informal votes		205	2.1	
Turnout		9,891	91.9	
Two-party-preferred result
Labor	James Hegney		56.3	−43.7
Liberal and Country	Francis Wilson		43.7	+43.7
Labor hold		Swing	N/A	

- Two party preferred vote was estimated.

=== Moore ===
1959 Western Australian state election: Moore
Party	Candidate	Votes	%	±%
Country	Edgar Lewis	unopposed		
Country hold		Swing		

=== Mount Hawthorn ===
1959 Western Australian state election: Mount Hawthorn
Party	Candidate	Votes	%	±%
Labor	Bill Hegney	6,406	56.3	−6.7
Liberal and Country	Hugh O'Doherty	4,795	42.1	+8.8
Communist	Edward Zeffertt	183	1.6	−2.1
Total formal votes		11,384	96.6	+0.5
Informal votes		398	3.4	−0.5
Turnout		11,782	93.4	+0.6
Two-party-preferred result
Labor	Bill Hegney		57.7	−8.6
Liberal and Country	Hugh O'Doherty		42.3	+8.6
Labor hold		Swing	−8.6	

=== Mount Lawley ===
1959 Western Australian state election: Mount Lawley
Party	Candidate	Votes	%	±%
Independent	Edward Oldfield	4,963	44.8	−23.0
Liberal and Country	Alexander Barras	4,705	42.5	+10.3
Democratic Labor	Ernest Parker	1,412	12.7	+12.7
Total formal votes		11,080	97.2	+2.2
Informal votes		321	2.8	−2.2
Turnout		11,401	93.6	−0.3
Two-candidate-preferred result
Independent	Edward Oldfield	5,547	50.1	−17.7
Liberal and Country	Alexander Barras	5,533	49.9	+17.7
Independent hold		Swing	−17.7	

=== Mount Marshall ===
1959 Western Australian state election: Mount Marshall
Party	Candidate	Votes	%	±%
Country	George Cornell	unopposed		
Country hold		Swing		

=== Murchison ===
1959 Western Australian state election: Murchison
Party	Candidate	Votes	%	±%
Labor	Everard O'Brien	1,638	47.0	−12.1
Liberal and Country	Richard Burt	1,555	44.6	+3.7
Democratic Labor	George Jensen	295	8.5	+8.5
Total formal votes		3,488	98.7	+1.5
Informal votes		47	1.3	−1.5
Turnout		3,535	87.8	+2.7
Two-party-preferred result
Liberal and Country	Richard Burt	1,778	51.0	+10.1
Labor	Everard O'Brien	1,710	49.0	−10.1
Liberal and Country gain from Labor		Swing	+10.1	

=== Murray ===
1959 Western Australian state election: Murray
Party	Candidate	Votes	%	±%
Liberal and Country	Ross McLarty	unopposed		
Liberal and Country hold		Swing		

=== Narrogin ===
1959 Western Australian state election: Narrogin
Party	Candidate	Votes	%	±%
Country	William Manning	3,750	72.3	+50.9
Labor	Percy Munday	1,434	27.7	−1.1
Total formal votes		5,184	98.8	+0.7
Informal votes		61	1.2	−0.7
Turnout		5,245	93.2	+0.1
Country hold		Swing	+6.8	

=== Nedlands ===
1959 Western Australian state election: Nedlands
Party	Candidate	Votes	%	±%
Liberal and Country	Charles Court	unopposed		
Liberal and Country hold		Swing		

=== North Perth ===
1959 Western Australian state election: North Perth
Party	Candidate	Votes	%	±%
Liberal and Country	Ray O'Connor	3,490	46.3	+0.6
Labor	Stan Lapham	3,321	44.1	−10.2
Democratic Labor	William Sawyer	725	9.6	+9.6
Total formal votes		7,536	97.6	+0.2
Informal votes		188	2.4	−0.2
Turnout		7,724	91.9	−0.2
Two-party-preferred result
Liberal and Country	Ray O'Connor	4,060	53.9	+8.2
Labor	Stan Lapham	3,476	46.1	−8.2
Liberal and Country gain from Labor		Swing	+8.2	

=== Northam ===
1959 Western Australian state election: Northam
Party	Candidate	Votes	%	±%
Labor	Albert Hawke	2,911	57.6	−18.8
Liberal and Country	Lawrence Solomon	1,860	36.8	+36.8
Democratic Labor	Brian McGinty	285	5.6	+5.6
Total formal votes		5,056	99.2	+1.3
Informal votes		43	0.8	−1.3
Turnout		5,099	94.3	+2.8
Two-party-preferred result
Labor	Albert Hawke		58.4	−18.0
Liberal and Country	Lawrence Solomon		41.6	+41.6
Labor hold		Swing	N/A	

- Two party preferred vote was estimated.

=== Pilbara ===
1959 Western Australian state election: Pilbara
Party	Candidate	Votes	%	±%
Labor	Arthur Bickerton	656	62.0	−4.9
Liberal and Country	Neil Radley	402	38.0	+4.9
Total formal votes		1,058	97.4	−1.3
Informal votes		28	2.6	+1.3
Turnout		1,086	76.1	−5.2
Labor hold		Swing	−4.9	

=== Roe ===
1959 Western Australian state election: Roe
Party	Candidate	Votes	%	±%
Country	Charles Perkins	2,669	58.1	−41.9
Independent Country	Edward Biglin	1,922	41.9	+41.9
Total formal votes		4,591	98.4	
Informal votes		74	1.6	
Turnout		4,665	91.7	
Country hold		Swing	N/A	

=== South Fremantle ===
1959 Western Australian state election: South Fremantle
Party	Candidate	Votes	%	±%
Labor	Dick Lawrence	8,186	87.5	+11.2
Communist	George Kendrick	1,173	12.5	+12.5
Total formal votes		9,359	90.6	−5.6
Informal votes		973	9.4	+5.6
Turnout		10,332	89.8	−0.6
Labor hold		Swing	N/A	

=== South Perth ===
1959 Western Australian state election: South Perth
Party	Candidate	Votes	%	±%
Independent Liberal	Bill Grayden	5,045	54.5	+27.9
Liberal and Country	George Strickland	4,208	45.5	+18.4
Total formal votes		9,253	97.2	−0.8
Informal votes		266	2.8	+0.8
Turnout		9,519	93.4	0.0
Independent Liberal hold		Swing	N/A	

=== Stirling ===
1959 Western Australian state election: Stirling
Party	Candidate	Votes	%	±%
Country	Arthur Watts	unopposed		
Country hold		Swing		

=== Subiaco ===
1959 Western Australian state election: Subiaco
Party	Candidate	Votes	%	±%
Liberal and Country	Hugh Guthrie	3,943	46.7	+18.3
Labor	Percival Potter	3,891	46.1	−1.2
Democratic Labor	Ronald Bulbeck	604	7.2	+7.2
Total formal votes		8,438	98.1	+0.8
Informal votes		165	1.9	−0.8
Turnout		8,603	92.5	+0.3
Two-party-preferred result
Liberal and Country	Hugh Guthrie	4,442	52.6	+4.3
Labor	Percival Potter	3,996	47.4	−4.3
Liberal and Country gain from Labor		Swing	+4.3	

=== Toodyay ===
1959 Western Australian state election: Toodyay
Party	Candidate	Votes	%	±%
Labor	John Rolinson	1,541	34.2	−15.1
Country	James Craig	1,433	31.8	−18.9
Country	Joseph Farrell	1,422	31.6	+31.6
Independent Labor	John Acott	106	2.4	+2.4
Total formal votes		4,502	97.7	0.0
Informal votes		108	2.3	0.0
Turnout		4,610	91.9	+3.0
Two-party-preferred result
Country	James Craig	2,773	61.6	+10.9
Labor	John Rolinson	1,729	38.4	−10.9
Country hold		Swing	+10.9	

=== Vasse ===
1959 Western Australian state election: Vasse
Party	Candidate	Votes	%	±%
Liberal and Country	William Bovell	3,984	78.1	−21.9
Democratic Labor	George Shervington	1,119	21.9	+21.9
Total formal votes		5,103	97.4	
Informal votes		134	2.6	
Turnout		5,237	94.2	
Liberal and Country hold		Swing	N/A	

=== Victoria Park ===
1959 Western Australian state election: Victoria Park
Party	Candidate	Votes	%	±%
Labor	Hugh Andrew	4,878	51.3	−10.9
Liberal and Country	David Hooper	3,188	33.5	−4.3
Independent	Harold Hawthorne	789	8.3	+8.3
Democratic Labor	William Carter	663	7.0	+7.0
Total formal votes		9,518	97.9	+0.1
Informal votes		199	2.1	−0.1
Turnout		9,717	92.7	−0.1
Two-party-preferred result
Labor	Hugh Andrew		56.4	−5.8
Liberal and Country	David Hooper		43.6	+5.8
Labor hold		Swing	−5.8	

- Two party preferred vote was estimated.

=== Warren ===
1959 Western Australian state election: Warren
Party	Candidate	Votes	%	±%
Labor	Joseph Rowberry	2,684	53.4	−46.6
Liberal and Country	Walter Muir	2,025	40.3	+40.3
Democratic Labor	Paul Brennan	319	6.4	+6.4
Total formal votes		5,028	98.9	
Informal votes		55	1.1	
Turnout		5,083	96.6	
Two-party-preferred result
Labor	Joseph Rowberry		54.3	−45.7
Liberal and Country	Walter Muir		45.7	+45.7
Labor hold		Swing	N/A	

- Two party preferred vote was estimated.

=== Wembley Beaches ===
1959 Western Australian state election: Wembley Beaches
Party	Candidate	Votes	%	±%
Liberal and Country	Les Nimmo	7,884	52.0	+14.5
Labor	Frederick Marshall	5,951	39.3	−10.2
Democratic Labor	William Coyne	1,327	8.8	+8.8
Total formal votes		15,162	98.6	+0.9
Informal votes		212	1.4	−0.9
Turnout		15,374	95.2	+0.2
Two-party-preferred result
Liberal and Country	Les Nimmo		59.4	+11.3
Labor	Frederick Marshall		40.6	−11.3
Liberal and Country gain from Labor		Swing	+11.3	

- Two party preferred vote was estimated.

=== West Perth ===
1959 Western Australian state election: West Perth
Party	Candidate	Votes	%	±%
Labor	Stanley Heal	3,421	50.7	−7.1
Liberal and Country	Raymond Nowland	3,322	49.3	+7.1
Total formal votes		6,743	97.9	+0.6
Informal votes		145	2.1	−0.6
Turnout		6,888	87.9	−0.8
Labor hold		Swing	−7.1	

== See also ==
- 1959 Western Australian state election
- Candidates of the 1959 Western Australian state election
- Members of the Western Australian Legislative Assembly, 1959–1962
