= Candidates of the 1956 Western Australian state election =

The 1956 Western Australian state election was held on 7 April 1956.

== Retiring Members ==
=== Labor ===
- Harry McCulloch (MLA) (Hannans)
- Herbert Styants (MLA) (Kalgoorlie)

=== LCL ===
- George Yates (MLA) (South Perth)
- Florence Cardell-Oliver (MLA) (Subiaco)

=== Country ===
- Victor Doney (MLA) (Narrogin)

== Legislative Assembly ==
Sitting members are shown in bold text. Successful candidates are highlighted in the relevant colour. Where there is possible confusion, an asterisk (*) is also used.

Electorate	Held by	Labor candidate	LCL candidate	Country candidate	Other candidates
Albany	Country	Jack Hall		**Leonard Hill**; Alfred Gulvin	
Avon Valley	LCL		**James Mann**	John Stratton	
Beeloo	Labor	**Colin Jamieson**	John Alden		
Blackwood	LCL		**John Hearman**		
Boulder	Labor	**Arthur Moir**			
Bunbury	LCL	Charles Webber	**George Roberts**		
Canning	Labor	Bill Gaffy	Richard Marris		
Claremont	LCL		Harold Crommelin*; Laurence Snook; **Charles North**		
Collie	Labor	**Harry May**		Norman Coote	Norman Lacey (Comm.)
Cottesloe	LCL		**Ross Hutchinson**		Leonard Stratton (Ind.)
Dale	LCL		**Gerald Wild**		Ivan Locke (Ind.)
Darling Range	Country			**Ray Owen**	
East Perth	Labor	**Herb Graham**	Edmund Madigan		
Eyre	Labor	**Emil Nulsen**			
Fremantle	Labor	**Joseph Sleeman**			Paddy Troy (Comm.)
Gascoyne	Labor	**Daniel Norton**	Kenneth Illingworth		
Geraldton	Labor	**Bill Sewell**	Arnold Devlin	Charles Eadon-Clarke	Joyce Webber (Ind.)
Greenough	LCL		**David Brand**		
Guildford-Midland	Labor	**John Brady**			Albert Marks (Comm.)
Harvey	LCL		**Iven Manning**		
Kalgoorlie	Labor	Tom Evans	Percy Millington		Harold Illingworth (Ind.)
Katanning	Country			**Crawford Nalder**	
Kimberley	Labor	**John Rhatigan**			
Leederville	Labor	**Ted Johnson**	**Les Nimmo**		
Maylands	LCL	Merv Toms	Ellen Lulham		Herbert Robinson (Ind. Lib)
Melville	Labor	**John Tonkin**			James Hart (Ind.)
Merredin-Yilgarn	Labor	**Lionel Kelly**	Robert Loder	Alfred Walker	
Middle Swan	Labor	**James Hegney**			
Moore	Country			**John Ackland**	
Mount Hawthorn	Labor	**Bill Hegney**	William Bailey		William Anear (Comm.)
Mount Lawley	LCL		**Arthur Abbott**		Edward Oldfield* (Ind. Lib)
Mount Marshall	Country			**George Cornell**	
Murchison	Labor	**Everard O'Brien**	Carlyle Newman		
Murray	LCL		**Ross McLarty**		
Narrogin	Country	Percy Munday	Robert Farr	William Manning*; Bill Robinson; Frank Ashworth	
Nedlands	LCL		**Charles Court**		David Grayden (Ind. Lib)
North Perth	Labor	**Stan Lapham**	Leslie Fawcett		
Northam	Labor	**Albert Hawke**			James Collins (Ind. Lib)
Pilbara	Labor	**Alec Rodoreda**	Rowland Charlton		
Roe	Country			**Charles Perkins**	
South Fremantle	Labor	**Dick Lawrence**			Michael Robson (Ind. Labor)
South Perth	LCL	Francis French	James Smith		Bill Grayden* (Ind. Lib); Cole Sangster (Ind.)
Stirling	Country			**Arthur Watts**	
Subiaco	LCL	Percival Potter	Edgar Paddick		Joseph Abrahams (Ind. Lib); Walter Richardson (Ind. Lib)
Toodyay	Country			**Lindsay Thorn**	John Rolinson (Ind. Labor)
Vasse	LCL		**William Bovell**		
Victoria Park	Labor	**Ron Davies**	Benjamin Marshall		
Warren	Labor	**Ernest Hoar**			
Wembley Beaches	LCL	Frederick Marshall	Bertha Beecroft		Sydney Cheek (Ind. Lib); Les Laracy (Ind.)
West Perth	Labor	**Stanley Heal**	Raymond Nowland		

== See also ==
- Members of the Western Australian Legislative Assembly, 1953–1956
- Members of the Western Australian Legislative Assembly, 1956–1959
- 1956 Western Australian Legislative Council election
- 1956 Western Australian state election
