= Candidates of the 1959 Western Australian state election =

The 1959 Western Australian state election was held on 21 March 1959.

== Retiring Members ==
=== Labor ===
- Joseph Sleeman (MLA) (Fremantle)

=== Country ===
- Lindsay Thorn (MLA) (Toodyay)

== Legislative Assembly ==
Sitting members are shown in bold text. Successful candidates are highlighted in the relevant colour. Where there is possible confusion, an asterisk (*) is also used.

Electorate	Held by	Labor candidate	LCL candidate	Country candidate	Other candidates
Albany	Labor	**Jack Hall**	Roy Wellington	Vincent Liddelow	Charles Johnson (Ind.); Ernest Rogers (Ind.)
Avon Valley	LCL		**James Mann**	John Stratton	
Beeloo	Labor	**Colin Jamieson**	Gordon Clark		Patrick Riordan (DLP)
Blackwood	LCL		**John Hearman**	Duncan Muir	
Boulder	Labor	**Arthur Moir**			
Bunbury	LCL	Forrest Hay	**George Roberts**		
Canning	Labor	**Bill Gaffy**	Des O'Neil		Michael O'Brien (DLP)
Claremont	LCL		**Harold Crommelin**		
Collie	Labor	**Harry May**			Norman Coote (Ind.)
Cottesloe	LCL	Edmund Edwards	**Ross Hutchinson**		
Dale	LCL		**Gerald Wild**	Arthur Mills; Andrew McPhail	William Williams (Ind.)
Darling Range	Country	Henry Harris	John Kostera	**Ray Owen**	Michael Coyne (DLP)
East Perth	Labor	**Herb Graham**	John Martin		John Deane (DLP)
Eyre	Labor	**Emil Nulsen**	Orlando Stuart		
Fremantle	Labor	Harry Fletcher			Henry Miller (DLP); Paddy Troy (Comm.)
Gascoyne	Labor	**Daniel Norton**	Thomas Orr		
Geraldton	Labor	**Bill Sewell**	Gerald Throssell		Septimus Waldon (DLP)
Greenough	LCL		**David Brand**		
Guildford-Midland	Labor	**John Brady**			John Gandini (Comm.)
Harvey	LCL		**Iven Manning**		
Kalgoorlie	Labor	**Tom Evans**	Percy Millington		Harold Illingworth (Ind.)
Katanning	Country			**Crawford Nalder**	
Kimberley	Labor	**John Rhatigan**	Nolan McDaniel		
Leederville	Labor	**Ted Johnson**	Guy Henn		John Antill (DLP)
Maylands	Labor	**Merv Toms**	Walter Bonnett		
Melville	Labor	**John Tonkin**			
Merredin-Yilgarn	Labor	**Lionel Kelly**	Ronald Lee		
Middle Swan	Labor	**James Hegney**	Francis Wilson		Brian Peachey (DLP)
Moore	Country			**Edgar Lewis**	
Mount Hawthorn	Labor	**Bill Hegney**	Hugh O'Doherty		Edward Zeffertt (Comm.)
Mount Lawley	Independent		Alexander Barras		**Edward Oldfield*** (Ind.); Ernest Parker (DLP)
Mount Marshall	Country			**George Cornell**	
Murchison	Labor	**Everard O'Brien**	Richard Burt		George Jensen (DLP)
Murray	LCL		**Ross McLarty**		
Narrogin	Country	Percy Munday		**William Manning**	
Nedlands	LCL		**Charles Court**		
North Perth	Labor	**Stan Lapham**	Ray O'Connor		William Sawyer (DLP)
Northam	Labor	**Albert Hawke**	Lawrence Solomon		Brian McGinty (DLP)
Pilbara	Labor	**Arthur Bickerton**	Neil Radley		
Roe	Country			**Charles Perkins**	Edward Biglin (Ind.)
South Fremantle	Labor	**Dick Lawrence**			George Kendrick (Comm.)
South Perth	Independent		George Strickland		**Bill Grayden** (Ind. Lib)
Stirling	Country			**Arthur Watts**	
Subiaco	Labor	**Percival Potter**	Hugh Guthrie		Ronald Bulbeck (DLP)
Toodyay	Country	John Rolinson		James Craig*; Joseph Farrell	John Acott (Ind. Lab)
Vasse	LCL		**William Bovell**		George Shervington (DLP)
Victoria Park	Labor	**Ron Davies**	David Hooper		Harold Hawthorne (Ind.); William Carter (DLP)
Warren	Labor	**Joseph Rowberry**	Walter Muir		Paul Brennan (DLP)
Wembley Beaches	Labor	**Frederick Marshall**	Les Nimmo		William Coyne (DLP)
West Perth	Labor	**Stanley Heal**	Raymond Nowland		

== See also ==
- Members of the Western Australian Legislative Assembly, 1956–1959
- Members of the Western Australian Legislative Assembly, 1959–1962
- 1960 Western Australian Legislative Council election
- 1959 Western Australian state election
