= Members of the Western Australian Legislative Assembly, 1956–1959 =

This is a list of members of the Western Australian Legislative Assembly between the 1956 election and the 1959 election, together known as the 22nd Parliament.

Name	Party	District	Years in office
John Ackland^{[3]}	Country	Moore	1947–1958
Hugh Andrew	Labor	Victoria Park	1953–1961
Arthur Bickerton^{[2]}	Labor	Pilbara	1958–1974
Stewart Bovell	Liberal	Vasse	1947–1971
John Brady	Labor	Guildford-Midland	1948–1974
David Brand	Liberal	Greenough	1945–1975
George Cornell	Country	Mount Marshall	1947–1967
Charles Court	Liberal	Nedlands	1953–1982
Harold Crommelin	Liberal	Claremont	1956–1968
Tom Evans	Labor	Kalgoorlie	1956–1980
Bill Gaffy	Labor	Canning	1956–1959
Herb Graham	Labor	East Perth	1943–1973
Bill Grayden	Ind. Lib.	South Perth	1947–1949; 1956–1993
Jack Hall	Labor	Albany	1956–1970
Albert Hawke	Labor	Northam	1933–1968
Stanley Heal	Labor	West Perth	1953–1965
John Hearman	Liberal	Blackwood	1950–1968
Bill Hegney	Labor	Mount Hawthorn	1939–1968
James Hegney	Labor	Middle Swan	1930–1947; 1950–1968
Ernest Hoar^{[1]}	Labor	Warren	1943–1957
Ross Hutchinson	Liberal	Cottesloe	1950–1977
Colin Jamieson	Labor	Beeloo	1953–1986
Ted Johnson	Labor	Leederville	1952–1959
Lionel Kelly	Labor	Merredin-Yilgarn	1941–1968
Stan Lapham	Labor	North Perth	1953–1959; 1968–1974
Dick Lawrence	Labor	South Fremantle	1951–1960
Edgar Lewis^{[3]}	Country	Moore	1958–1974
James Mann	Liberal	Avon Valley	1930–1962
Iven Manning	Liberal	Harvey	1950–1974
William Manning	Country	Narrogin	1956–1974
Frederick Marshall	Labor	Wembley Beaches	1956–1959
Harry May	Labor	Collie	1947–1968
Sir Ross McLarty	Liberal	Murray	1930–1962
Arthur Moir	Labor	Boulder	1951–1971
Crawford Nalder	Country	Katanning	1947–1974
Daniel Norton	Labor	Gascoyne	1953–1974
Emil Nulsen	Labor	Eyre	1932–1962
Everard O'Brien	Labor	Murchison	1952–1959
Edward Oldfield	Ind. Lib.	Mount Lawley	1951–1965
Ray Owen	Country	Darling Range	1944–1947; 1950–1962
Charles Perkins	Country	Roe	1942–1962
Percival Potter	Labor	Subiaco	1956–1959
John Rhatigan	Labor	Kimberley	1953–1968
George Roberts	Liberal	Bunbury	1955–1962
Alec Rodoreda^{[2]}	Labor	Pilbara	1933–1958
Joseph Rowberry^{[1]}	Labor	Warren	1958–1968
Bill Sewell	Labor	Geraldton	1950–1974
Joseph Sleeman	Labor	Fremantle	1924–1959
Lindsay Thorn	Country	Toodyay	1930–1959
Merv Toms	Labor	Maylands	1956–1971
John Tonkin	Labor	Melville	1933–1977
Arthur Watts	Country	Stirling	1935–1962
Gerald Wild	Liberal	Dale	1947–1965

== Notes ==
^{1} On 17 December 1957, the Labor member for Warren, Ernest Hoar, resigned to take up an appointment as Agent-General for Western Australia in London. Labor candidate Joseph Rowberry won the resulting by-election on 25 January 1958.
^{2} On 11 March 1958, the Labor member for Pilbara, Alec Rodoreda, died. Labor candidate Arthur Bickerton was elected unopposed on 24 April 1958.
^{3} On 29 July 1958, the Country member for Moore, John Ackland, died. Country candidate Edgar Lewis won the resulting by-election on 20 September 1958.

== Sources ==
- "Former Members" (PDF). Parliament of Western Australia. 2011. Archived from the original (PDF) on 7 August 2011.
