= Results of the 1953 Western Australian state election (Legislative Assembly) =

Western Australian state election, 14 February 1953 Legislative Assembly << 1950–1956 >>
Enrolled voters	205,644^{[1]}				
Votes cast	192,225		Turnout	93.47%	+0.86%
Informal votes	5,028		Informal	2.62%	+0.64%
Summary of votes by party
Party	Primary votes	%	Swing	Seats	Change
Labor	93,157	49.76%	+7.92%	26	+ 3
Liberal and Country	71,042	37.95%	–2.13%	15	± 0
Country	9,196	4.91%	–4.40%	9	± 0
Ind. Lib.	3,458	1.85%	–0.40%	0	– 2
Communist	1,350	0.72%	+0.36%	0	± 0
Independent	8,994	4.80%	–1.35%	0	– 1
Total	192,225			50	

This is a list of electoral district results of the 1953 Western Australian election.

== Results by electoral district ==
=== Albany ===
1953 Western Australian state election: Albany
Party	Candidate	Votes	%	±%
Country	Leonard Hill	3,307	55.9	+12.0
Labor	Karl Schulze	2,604	44.1	+3.3
Total formal votes		5,911	98.7	−0.2
Informal votes		77	1.3	+0.2
Turnout		5,988	95.3	+1.0
Country hold		Swing	−1.1	

=== Avon Valley ===
1953 Western Australian state election: Avon Valley
Party	Candidate	Votes	%	±%
Liberal and Country	James Mann	unopposed		
Liberal and Country hold		Swing		

=== Blackwood ===
1953 Western Australian state election: Blackwood
Party	Candidate	Votes	%	±%
Liberal and Country	John Hearman	unopposed		
Liberal and Country hold		Swing		

=== Boulder ===
1953 Western Australian state election: Boulder
Party	Candidate	Votes	%	±%
Labor	Arthur Moir	unopposed		
Labor hold		Swing		

=== Bunbury ===
1953 Western Australian state election: Bunbury
Party	Candidate	Votes	%	±%
Labor	Frank Guthrie	unopposed		
Labor hold		Swing		

=== Canning ===
1953 Western Australian state election: Canning
Party	Candidate	Votes	%	±%
Labor	Colin Jamieson	6,344	51.3	+6.0
Liberal and Country	Arthur Griffith	6,022	48.7	+1.9
Total formal votes		12,366	97.5	−0.1
Informal votes		312	2.5	+0.1
Turnout		12,678	93.8	+2.9
Labor gain from Liberal and Country		Swing	+4.1	

=== Claremont ===
1953 Western Australian state election: Claremont
Party	Candidate	Votes	%	±%
Liberal and Country	Charles North	5,636	63.9	−36.1
Labor	Clifton Scott	3,185	36.1	+36.1
Total formal votes		8,821	98.9	
Informal votes		98	1.1	
Turnout		8,919	92.9	
Liberal and Country hold		Swing	N/A	

=== Collie ===
1953 Western Australian state election: Collie
Party	Candidate	Votes	%	±%
Labor	Harry May	unopposed		
Labor hold		Swing		

=== Cottesloe ===
1953 Western Australian state election: Cottesloe
Party	Candidate	Votes	%	±%
Liberal and Country	Ross Hutchinson	4,479	60.1	+0.3
Labor	Diana Hart	2,969	39.9	−0.3
Total formal votes		7,448	98.4	−0.6
Informal votes		118	1.6	+0.6
Turnout		7,566	93.6	+2.9
Liberal and Country hold		Swing	+0.3	

=== Dale ===
1953 Western Australian state election: Dale
Party	Candidate	Votes	%	±%
Liberal and Country	Gerald Wild	3,205	57.3	−1.1
Labor	Ronald Knowler	2,389	42.7	+14.6
Total formal votes		5,594	97.7	−0.5
Informal votes		134	2.3	+0.5
Turnout		5,728	92.5	+1.6
Liberal and Country hold		Swing	−13.3	

=== Darling Range ===
1953 Western Australian state election: Darling Range
Party	Candidate	Votes	%	±%
Country	Ray Owen	2,684	52.8	+25.7
Labor	John Rolinson	1,805	35.5	+9.2
Independent Liberal	Herbert Small	592	11.6	+11.6
Total formal votes		5,081	97.5	−0.4
Informal votes		132	2.5	+0.4
Turnout		5,213	91.6	−0.2
Two-party-preferred result
Country	Ray Owen		61.0	
Labor	John Rolinson		39.0	
Country hold		Swing	N/A	

- Two party preferred vote was estimated.

=== East Perth ===
1953 Western Australian state election: East Perth
Party	Candidate	Votes	%	±%
Labor	Herb Graham	unopposed		
Labor hold		Swing		

=== Eyre ===
1953 Western Australian state election: Eyre
Party	Candidate	Votes	%	±%
Labor	Emil Nulsen	unopposed		
Labor hold		Swing		

=== Fremantle ===
1953 Western Australian state election: Fremantle
Party	Candidate	Votes	%	±%
Labor	Joseph Sleeman	6,795	92.0	+34.2
Communist	Paddy Troy	595	8.0	+5.7
Total formal votes		7,390	94.4	−3.5
Informal votes		434	5.6	+3.5
Turnout		7,824	91.7	+1.8
Labor hold		Swing	N/A	

=== Gascoyne ===
1953 Western Australian state election: Gascoyne
Party	Candidate	Votes	%	±%
Labor	Daniel Norton	726	50.4	−26.1
Independent Liberal	Noel Butcher	519	36.0	+36.0
Liberal and Country	Robert Iles	116	8.1	−15.4
Total formal votes		1,440	96.3	−0.9
Informal votes		55	3.7	+0.9
Turnout		1,495	90.2	+4.4
Labor hold		Swing	N/A	

- Preferences were not distributed.
- Gascoyne had been won by the Independent Liberal candidate in the 1951 by-election.

=== Geraldton ===
1953 Western Australian state election: Geraldton
Party	Candidate	Votes	%	±%
Labor	Bill Sewell	3,011	61.9	+11.2
Liberal and Country	James McAleer	1,127	23.2	+23.2
Liberal and Country	Samuel Davey	593	12.2	+12.2
Independent	Joyce Webber	131	2.7	+2.7
Total formal votes		4,862	98.2	−0.7
Informal votes		90	1.8	+0.7
Turnout		4,952	93.8	+3.4
Two-party-preferred result
Labor	Bill Sewell		64.5	+13.8
Liberal and Country	James McAleer		35.5	+35.5
Labor hold		Swing	+13.8	

- Two party preferred vote was estimated.

=== Greenough ===
1953 Western Australian state election: Greenough
Party	Candidate	Votes	%	±%
Liberal and Country	David Brand	2,691	65.5	−34.5
Labor	James Clune	1,414	34.5	+34.5
Total formal votes		4,105	98.6	
Informal votes		60	1.4	
Turnout		4,165	91.4	
Liberal and Country hold		Swing		

=== Guildford-Midland ===
1953 Western Australian state election: Guildford-Midland
Party	Candidate	Votes	%	±%
Labor	John Brady	7,910	92.8	+34.3
Communist	Albert Marks	614	7.2	−0.3
Total formal votes		8,524	93.8	−4.4
Informal votes		562	6.2	+4.4
Turnout		9,086	94.0	−1.1
Labor hold		Swing	N/A	

=== Hannans ===
1953 Western Australian state election: Hannans
Party	Candidate	Votes	%	±%
Labor	Herbert McCulloch	2,210	60.3	−1.2
Independent	Harold Illingworth	1,453	39.7	+39.7
Total formal votes		3,663	97.4	−0.5
Informal votes		98	2.6	+0.5
Turnout		3,761	91.0	0.0
Labor hold		Swing	N/A	

=== Harvey ===
1953 Western Australian state election: Harvey
Party	Candidate	Votes	%	±%
Liberal and Country	Iven Manning	2,737	64.6	+15.7
Labor	Robert McCallum	1,500	35.4	+5.1
Total formal votes		4,237	98.1	−0.6
Informal votes		84	1.9	+0.6
Turnout		4,321	94.6	+2.0
Liberal and Country hold		Swing	−2.3	

=== Kalgoorlie ===
1953 Western Australian state election: Kalgoorlie
Party	Candidate	Votes	%	±%
Labor	Herbert Styants	unopposed		
Labor hold		Swing		

=== Katanning ===
1953 Western Australian state election: Katanning
Party	Candidate	Votes	%	±%
Country	Crawford Nalder	unopposed		
Country hold		Swing		

=== Kimberley ===
1953 Western Australian state election: Kimberley
Party	Candidate	Votes	%	±%
Labor	Aubrey Coverley	unopposed		
Labor hold		Swing		

=== Leederville ===
1953 Western Australian state election: Leederville
Party	Candidate	Votes	%	±%
Labor	Ted Johnson	4,067	56.0	+3.9
Liberal and Country	Jessie Robertson	3,193	44.0	−3.9
Total formal votes		7,260	98.2	+0.1
Informal votes		130	1.8	−0.1
Turnout		7,390	94.8	+3.4
Labor hold		Swing	+3.9	

=== Maylands ===
1953 Western Australian state election: Maylands
Party	Candidate	Votes	%	±%
Labor	Owen Hanlon	3,920	46.3	+4.6
Liberal and Country	Edward Oldfield	3,586	42.4	+3.0
Independent	Samuel Spence	959	11.3	−6.4
Total formal votes		8,465	97.9	+0.4
Informal votes		181	2.1	−0.4
Turnout		8,646	94.5	+3.9
Two-party-preferred result
Liberal and Country	Edward Oldfield	4,292	50.7	−2.3
Labor	Owen Hanlon	4,173	49.3	+2.3
Liberal and Country hold		Swing	−2.3	

=== Melville ===
1953 Western Australian state election: Melville
Party	Candidate	Votes	%	±%
Labor	John Tonkin	7,301	67.3	+5.1
Independent	James Collins	2,376	21.9	+21.9
Independent	James Hart	1,173	10.8	+10.8
Total formal votes		10,850	97.5	−0.7
Informal votes		278	2.5	+0.7
Turnout		11,128	95.7	+2.4
Labor hold		Swing	N/A	

- Preferences were not distributed.

=== Merredin-Yilgarn ===
1953 Western Australian state election: Merredin-Yilgarn
Party	Candidate	Votes	%	±%
Labor	Lionel Kelly	unopposed		
Labor hold		Swing		

=== Middle Swan ===
1953 Western Australian state election: Middle Swan
Party	Candidate	Votes	%	±%
Labor	James Hegney	unopposed		
Labor hold		Swing		

=== Moore ===
1953 Western Australian state election: Moore
Party	Candidate	Votes	%	±%
Country	John Ackland	unopposed		
Country hold		Swing		

=== Mount Hawthorn ===
1953 Western Australian state election: Mount Hawthorn
Party	Candidate	Votes	%	±%
Labor	Bill Hegney	6,473	65.6	+11.5
Liberal and Country	Leonard Seaton	3,396	34.4	−8.6
Total formal votes		9,869	98.0	+1.4
Informal votes		198	2.0	−1.4
Turnout		10,067	94.2	+1.5
Labor hold		Swing	+9.5	

=== Mount Lawley ===
1953 Western Australian state election: Mount Lawley
Party	Candidate	Votes	%	±%
Liberal and Country	Arthur Abbott	5,944	89.8	+20.7
Independent	Edward Zeffertt	672	10.2	+10.2
Total formal votes		6,616	90.6	−3.7
Informal votes		689	9.4	+3.7
Turnout		7,305	91.8	+1.9
Liberal and Country hold		Swing	N/A	

=== Mount Marshall ===
1953 Western Australian state election: Mount Marshall
Party	Candidate	Votes	%	±%
Country	George Cornell	unopposed		
Country hold		Swing		

=== Murchison ===
1953 Western Australian state election: Murchison
Party	Candidate	Votes	%	±%
Labor	Everard O'Brien	1,559	59.2	−0.8
Liberal and Country	John Porteus	569	21.6	+21.6
Liberal and Country	John Thompson	505	19.2	−20.8
Total formal votes		2,633	97.2	−1.0
Informal votes		77	2.8	+1.0
Turnout		2,710	89.6	+10.3
Two-party-preferred result
Labor	Everard O'Brien		61.1	+1.1
Liberal and Country	John Porteus		38.9	−1.1
Labor hold		Swing	+1.1	

- Two party preferred vote was estimated.

=== Murray ===
1953 Western Australian state election: Murray
Party	Candidate	Votes	%	±%
Liberal and Country	Ross McLarty	2,989	63.9	+1.8
Labor	Frederick Kidby	1,686	36.1	−1.8
Total formal votes		4,675	98.8	+0.1
Informal votes		58	1.2	−0.1
Turnout		4,733	94.2	+3.4
Liberal and Country hold		Swing	+1.8	

=== Narrogin ===
1953 Western Australian state election: Narrogin
Party	Candidate	Votes	%	±%
Country	Victor Doney	unopposed		
Country hold		Swing		

=== Nedlands ===
1953 Western Australian state election: Nedlands
Party	Candidate	Votes	%	±%
Liberal and Country	Charles Court	2,834	32.3	−7.7
Independent Liberal	David Grayden	2,409	27.5	−6.4
Labor	Margaret Pitt Morison	1,948	22.2	+22.2
Liberal and Country	Peter Aldred	924	10.5	+10.5
Independent	Noel Symington	457	5.2	+5.2
Liberal and Country	Sidney Bedells	205	2.3	+2.3
Total formal votes		8,777	98.0	+0.5
Informal votes		183	2.0	−0.5
Turnout		8,960	93.5	+4.0
Two-candidate-preferred result
Liberal and Country	Charles Court	4,807	54.8	+8.2
Independent Liberal	David Grayden	3,970	45.2	−8.2
Liberal and Country gain from Independent Liberal		Swing	+8.2	

=== North Perth ===
1953 Western Australian state election: North Perth
Party	Candidate	Votes	%	±%
Labor	Stan Lapham	3,825	55.5	−2.0
Liberal and Country	Florence Hummerston	3,069	44.5	+2.0
Total formal votes		6,894	98.2	+0.2
Informal votes		129	1.8	−0.2
Turnout		7,023	93.2	+2.8
Labor hold		Swing	−2.0	

=== Northam ===
1953 Western Australian state election: Northam
Party	Candidate	Votes	%	±%
Labor	Albert Hawke	unopposed		
Labor hold		Swing		

=== Pilbara ===
1953 Western Australian state election: Pilbara
Party	Candidate	Votes	%	±%
Labor	Alec Rodoreda	607	66.0	+8.7
Liberal and Country	Rowland Charlton	313	34.0	−8.7
Total formal votes		920	97.9	−0.3
Informal votes		20	2.1	+0.3
Turnout		940	82.9	+5.7
Labor hold		Swing	+8.7	

=== Roe ===
1953 Western Australian state election: Roe
Party	Candidate	Votes	%	±%
Country	Charles Perkins	unopposed		
Country hold		Swing		

=== South Fremantle ===
1953 Western Australian state election: South Fremantle
Party	Candidate	Votes	%	±%
Labor	Dick Lawrence	unopposed		
Labor hold		Swing		

=== South Perth ===
1953 Western Australian state election: South Perth
Party	Candidate	Votes	%	±%
Liberal and Country	George Yates	3,656	46.7	−11.4
Labor	Francis French	3,173	40.6	−1.3
Independent	Carlyle Ferguson	996	12.7	+12.7
Total formal votes		7,825	97.6	−0.5
Informal votes		194	2.4	+0.5
Turnout		8,019	94.0	+2.3
Two-party-preferred result
Liberal and Country	George Yates	4,167	53.2	−4.9
Labor	Francis French	3,658	46.8	+4.9
Liberal and Country hold		Swing	−4.9	

=== Stirling ===
1953 Western Australian state election: Stirling
Party	Candidate	Votes	%	±%
Country	Arthur Watts	unopposed		
Country hold		Swing		

=== Subiaco ===
1953 Western Australian state election: Subiaco
Party	Candidate	Votes	%	±%
Liberal and Country	Florence Cardell-Oliver	4,310	56.7	−5.5
Labor	Thomas Henley	3,293	43.3	+5.5
Total formal votes		7,603	98.4	−0.3
Informal votes		124	1.6	+0.3
Turnout		7,727	93.7	+2.1
Liberal and Country hold		Swing	−5.5	

=== Toodyay ===
1953 Western Australian state election: Toodyay
Party	Candidate	Votes	%	±%
Country	Lindsay Thorn	unopposed		
Country hold		Swing		

=== Vasse ===
1953 Western Australian state election: Vasse
Party	Candidate	Votes	%	±%
Liberal and Country	William Bovell	unopposed		
Liberal and Country hold		Swing		

=== Victoria Park ===
1953 Western Australian state election: Victoria Park
Party	Candidate	Votes	%	±%
Labor	Hugh Andrew	4,222	55.5	+7.9
Liberal and Country	George Kerr	2,532	33.3	+33.3
Independent	Harold Hawthorne	715	9.4	+9.4
Communist	Neil Payne	141	1.9	+1.9
Total formal votes		7,610	96.9	−1.4
Informal votes		247	3.1	+1.4
Turnout		7,857	93.5	+2.0
Two-party-preferred result
Labor	Hugh Andrew		60.3	+12.7
Liberal and Country	George Kerr		39.7	+39.7
Labor gain from Independent		Swing	N/A	

=== Warren ===
1953 Western Australian state election: Warren
Party	Candidate	Votes	%	±%
Labor	Ernest Hoar	unopposed		
Labor hold		Swing		

=== Wembley Beaches ===
1953 Western Australian state election: Wembley Beaches
Party	Candidate	Votes	%	±%
Liberal and Country	Les Nimmo	6,204	57.7	−4.8
Labor	Eric Hall	4,556	42.3	+4.8
Total formal votes		10,760	98.8	+0.4
Informal votes		134	1.2	−0.4
Turnout		10,894	95.5	+3.6
Liberal and Country hold		Swing	−4.8	

=== West Perth ===
1953 Western Australian state election: West Perth
Party	Candidate	Votes	%	±%
Labor	Stanley Heal	3,665	52.4	+10.8
Liberal and Country	Joseph Totterdell	3,333	47.6	−5.3
Total formal votes		6,998	98.1	+0.7
Informal votes		132	1.9	−0.7
Turnout		7,130	91.9	+3.5
Labor gain from Liberal and Country		Swing	+8.1	

== See also ==
- 1953 Western Australian state election
- Members of the Western Australian Legislative Assembly, 1953–1956
- Candidates of the 1953 Western Australian state election
