= Results of the 1965 Western Australian state election (Legislative Assembly) =

Western Australian state election, 20 February 1965 Legislative Assembly << 1962–1968 >>
Enrolled voters	335,633^{[1]}				
Votes cast	309,893		Turnout	92.33%	–0.76%
Informal votes	9,634		Informal	3.11%	+1.32%
Summary of votes by party
Party	Primary votes	%	Swing	Seats	Change
Liberal and Country	144,178	48.02%	+6.84%	21	+ 3
Labor	128,025	42.64%	–1.77%	21	– 3
Country	14,630	4.87%	–1.06%	8	± 0
Democratic Labor	2,825	0.94%	–1.32%	0	± 0
Communist	284	0.09%	–0.32%	0	± 0
Ind. Lib.	4,630	1.54%	–0.02%	0	± 0
Independent	5,687	1.89%	–2.38%	0	± 0
Total	300,259			50	

This is a list of electoral district results of the 1965 Western Australian election.

== Results by electoral district ==
=== Albany ===
1965 Western Australian state election: Albany
Party	Candidate	Votes	%	±%
Labor	Jack Hall	3,586	58.2	−6.1
Liberal and Country	Norman Swarbrick	1,685	27.3	−8.4
Country	Charles Johnson	890	14.5	+14.5
Total formal votes		6,161	98.0	−1.2
Informal votes		126	2.0	+1.2
Turnout		6,287	94.7	−0.4
Two-party-preferred result
Labor	Jack Hall	3,675	59.6	−4.7
Liberal and Country	Norman Swarbrick	2,486	40.4	+4.7
Labor hold		Swing	−4.7	

=== Avon ===
1965 Western Australian state election: Avon
Party	Candidate	Votes	%	±%
Country	Harry Gayfer	unopposed		
Country hold		Swing		

=== Balcatta ===
1965 Western Australian state election: Balcatta
Party	Candidate	Votes	%	±%
Labor	Herb Graham	6,787	53.7	−1.2
Liberal and Country	Terrence Browne	5,844	46.3	+8.7
Total formal votes		12,631	97.0	−1.2
Informal votes		389	3.0	+1.2
Turnout		13,020	94.4	−1.5
Labor hold		Swing	−2.3	

=== Bayswater ===
1965 Western Australian state election: Bayswater
Party	Candidate	Votes	%	±%
Labor	Merv Toms	6,711	53.8	−46.2
Liberal and Country	Walter Bonnett	5,758	46.2	+46.2
Total formal votes		12,469	96.7	
Turnout		422	3.3	
Turnout		12,891	94.0	
Labor hold		Swing	N/A	

=== Beeloo ===
1965 Western Australian state election: Beeloo
Party	Candidate	Votes	%	±%
Labor	Colin Jamieson	6,440	60.1	+1.5
Liberal and Country	Henry Watson	4,271	39.9	+6.0
Total formal votes		10,711	95.9	−2.1
Informal votes		463	4.1	+2.1
Turnout		11,174	92.3	−1.4
Labor hold		Swing	+0.4	

=== Belmont ===
1965 Western Australian state election: Belmont
Party	Candidate	Votes	%	±%
Labor	James Hegney	5,743	52.3	−1.3
Liberal and Country	Boyd Buttsworth	5,246	47.7	+47.7
Total formal votes		10,989	95.9	−0.4
Informal votes		464	4.1	+0.4
Turnout		11,453	93.2	−1.9
Labor hold		Swing	N/A	

=== Blackwood ===
1965 Western Australian state election: Blackwood
Party	Candidate	Votes	%	±%
Liberal and Country	John Hearman	unopposed		
Liberal and Country hold		Swing		

=== Boulder-Eyre ===
1965 Western Australian state election: Boulder-Eyre
Party	Candidate	Votes	%	±%
Labor	Arthur Moir	unopposed		
Labor hold		Swing		

=== Bunbury ===
1965 Western Australian state election: Bunbury
Party	Candidate	Votes	%	±%
Liberal and Country	Maurice Williams	3,033	52.4	−1.3
Labor	Edward Cooke	2,755	47.6	+1.3
Total formal votes		5,788	98.8	−0.7
Informal votes		71	1.2	+0.7
Turnout		5,859	94.7	+0.6
Liberal and Country hold		Swing	−1.3	

=== Canning ===
1965 Western Australian state election: Canning
Party	Candidate	Votes	%	±%
Labor	Don May	4,972	48.3	+0.9
Liberal and Country	Ross Elliott	4,890	47.5	+8.4
Democratic Labor	Louis Raven	434	4.2	+4.2
Total formal votes		10,296	96.9	−1.5
Informal votes		325	3.1	+1.5
Turnout		10,621	92.9	−1.5
Two-party-preferred result
Liberal and Country	Ross Elliott	5,221	50.7	+1.9
Labor	Don May	5,075	49.3	−1.9
Liberal and Country gain from Labor		Swing	+1.9	

=== Claremont ===
1965 Western Australian state election: Claremont
Party	Candidate	Votes	%	±%
Liberal and Country	Harold Crommelin	7,171	77.0	+8.8
Labor	John Henshaw	2,141	23.0	+23.0
Total formal votes		9,312	97.2	−0.4
Informal votes		265	2.8	+0.4
Turnout		9,577	91.1	−0.1
Liberal and Country hold		Swing	+8.8	

=== Cockburn ===
1965 Western Australian state election: Cockburn
Party	Candidate	Votes	%	±%
Labor	Henry Curran	unopposed		
Labor hold		Swing		

=== Collie ===
1965 Western Australian state election: Collie
Party	Candidate	Votes	%	±%
Labor	Harry May	2,990	60.9	+2.0
Liberal and Country	Edward Cocker	1,923	39.1	+12.0
Total formal votes		4,913	97.7	−1.6
Informal votes		117	2.3	+1.6
Turnout		5,030	94.7	−0.1
Labor hold		Swing	−5.0	

=== Cottesloe ===
1965 Western Australian state election: Cottesloe
Party	Candidate	Votes	%	±%
Liberal and Country	Ross Hutchinson	5,954	61.7	+4.9
Labor	Richard Bryant	3,697	38.3	−4.9
Total formal votes		9,651	98.3	−0.7
Informal votes		162	1.7	+0.7
Turnout		9,813	91.6	−0.8
Liberal and Country hold		Swing	+4.9	

=== Dale ===
1965 Western Australian state election: Dale
Party	Candidate	Votes	%	±%
Liberal and Country	Gerald Wild	3,536	59.8	+1.2
Labor	Donald Culley	2,380	40.2	−1.2
Total formal votes		5,916	96.9	−2.0
Informal votes		187	3.1	+2.0
Turnout		6,103	92.1	−1.4
Liberal and Country hold		Swing	+1.2	

=== Darling Range ===
1965 Western Australian state election: Darling Range
Party	Candidate	Votes	%	±%
Liberal and Country	Ken Dunn	2,635	41.6	+8.7
Labor	Jack Metcalfe	1,927	30.4	−3.9
Country	Ray Owen	1,768	27.9	−5.0
Total formal votes		6,330	97.9	−0.3
Informal votes		137	2.1	+0.3
Turnout		6,467	92.9	−0.5
Two-party-preferred result
Liberal and Country	Ken Dunn	3,857	60.9	+2.3
Labor	Jack Metcalfe	2,473	39.1	−2.3
Liberal and Country hold		Swing	+2.3	

=== East Melville ===
1965 Western Australian state election: East Melville
Party	Candidate	Votes	%	±%
Liberal and Country	Des O'Neil	6,773	59.4	−4.2
Independent	Louis Joseph	4,630	40.6	+40.6
Total formal votes		11,403	95.1	−4.0
Informal votes		585	4.9	+4.0
Turnout		11,988	93.2	−1.6
Liberal and Country hold		Swing	N/A	

=== Fremantle ===
1965 Western Australian state election: Fremantle
Party	Candidate	Votes	%	±%
Labor	Harry Fletcher	6,647	67.4	+0.1
Liberal and Country	Ronald Shires	3,221	32.6	+1.8
Total formal votes		9,868	95.8	−1.5
Informal votes		429	4.2	+1.5
Turnout		10,297	90.7	−1.3
Labor hold		Swing	−1.6	

=== Gascoyne ===
1965 Western Australian state election: Gascoyne
Party	Candidate	Votes	%	±%
Labor	Daniel Norton	1,064	62.5	−37.5
Liberal and Country	Stewart Maver	556	32.7	+32.7
Independent	Neville Brandstater	82	4.8	+4.8
Total formal votes		1,702	97.5	
Informal votes		43	2.5	
Turnout		1,745	85.2	
Two-party-preferred result
Labor	Daniel Norton	1,106	65.8	−2.2
Liberal and Country	Stewart Maver	596	34.2	+2.2
Labor hold		Swing	−2.2	

=== Geraldton ===
1965 Western Australian state election: Geraldton
Party	Candidate	Votes	%	±%
Labor	Bill Sewell	2,948	52.4	0.0
Liberal and Country	Charles Raynor	2,450	43.6	+43.6
Independent	Raymond Goss	224	4.0	+4.0
Total formal votes		5,622	97.4	−1.7
Informal votes		147	2.6	+1.7
Turnout		5,769	93.4	−0.4
Two-party-preferred result
Labor	Bill Sewell	2,982	53.0	−2.5
Liberal and Country	Charles Raynor	2,640	47.0	+47.0
Labor hold		Swing	−2.5	

=== Greenough ===
1965 Western Australian state election: Greenough
Party	Candidate	Votes	%	±%
Liberal and Country	David Brand	unopposed		
Liberal and Country hold		Swing		

=== Kalgoorlie ===
1965 Western Australian state election: Kalgoorlie
Party	Candidate	Votes	%	±%
Labor	Tom Evans	unopposed		
Labor hold		Swing		

=== Karrinyup ===
1965 Western Australian state election: Karrinyup
Party	Candidate	Votes	%	±%
Liberal and Country	Les Nimmo	6,291	51.8	+5.0
Labor	Stan Lapham	5,247	43.2	−3.4
Democratic Labor	Gerardus Sappelli	605	5.0	−1.6
Total formal votes		12,143	98.1	−1.0
Informal votes		230	1.9	+1.0
Turnout		12,373	93.3	−1.7
Two-party-preferred result
Liberal and Country	Les Nimmo	6,805	56.0	+3.5
Labor	Stan Lapham	5,338	44.0	−3.5
Liberal and Country hold		Swing	+3.5	

=== Katanning ===
1965 Western Australian state election: Katanning
Party	Candidate	Votes	%	±%
Country	Crawford Nalder	unopposed		
Country hold		Swing		

=== Kimberley ===
1965 Western Australian state election: Kimberley
Party	Candidate	Votes	%	±%
Labor	John Rhatigan	1,368	61.6	−17.1
Liberal and Country	George Drysdale	853	38.4	+38.4
Total formal votes		2,221	94.5	−1.6
Informal votes		130	5.5	+1.6
Turnout		2,351	79.9	+0.3
Labor hold		Swing	N/A	

=== Maylands ===
1965 Western Australian state election: Maylands
Party	Candidate	Votes	%	±%
Liberal and Country	Bob Marshall	4,849	48.6	+4.9
Labor	Edward Oldfield	4,631	46.4	−4.1
Democratic Labor	Francis Pownall	498	5.0	−0.9
Total formal votes		9,978	97.5	−1.0
Informal votes		254	2.5	+1.0
Turnout		10,232	93.3	−0.3
Two-party-preferred result
Liberal and Country	Bob Marshall	5,246	52.6	+4.0
Labor	Edward Oldfield	4,732	47.4	−4.0
Liberal and Country gain from Labor		Swing	+4.0	

=== Melville ===
1965 Western Australian state election: Melville
Party	Candidate	Votes	%	±%
Labor	John Tonkin	6,261	57.0	−4.3
Liberal and Country	Albert Gainsford-Brackley	4,718	43.0	+4.3
Total formal votes		10,979	97.4	−1.9
Informal votes		293	2.6	+1.9
Turnout		11,272	94.0	−0.3
Labor hold		Swing	−4.3	

=== Merredin-Yilgarn ===
1965 Western Australian state election: Merredin-Yilgarn
Party	Candidate	Votes	%	±%
Labor	Lionel Kelly	2,276	53.4	−4.7
Liberal and Country	Jack Stewart	1,326	31.1	+31.1
Country	Kenneth Jones	662	15.5	−26.4
Total formal votes		4,264	97.3	−1.6
Informal votes		118	2.7	+1.6
Turnout		4,382	91.6	−1.3
Two-party-preferred result
Labor	Lionel Kelly	2,342	54.9	−3.2
Liberal and Country	Jack Stewart	1,922	45.1	+45.1
Labor hold		Swing	−3.2	

=== Moore ===
1965 Western Australian state election: Moore
Party	Candidate	Votes	%	±%
Country	Edgar Lewis	3,383	68.0	−32.0
Independent	Albert Tonkin	1,596	32.0	+32.0
Total formal votes		4,979	97.9	
Informal votes		108	2.1	
Turnout		5,087	91.0	
Country hold		Swing	N/A	

=== Mount Hawthorn ===
1965 Western Australian state election: Mount Hawthorn
Party	Candidate	Votes	%	±%
Labor	Bill Hegney	5,175	52.7	−3.5
Liberal and Country	James Ring	4,641	47.3	+3.5
Total formal votes		9,816	96.3	−2.3
Informal votes		377	3.7	+2.3
Turnout		10,193	91.8	−1.2
Labor hold		Swing	−3.5	

=== Mount Lawley ===
1965 Western Australian state election: Mount Lawley
Party	Candidate	Votes	%	±%
Liberal and Country	Ray O'Connor	6,189	63.6	+5.2
Labor	Mervyn Knight	3,545	36.4	−5.2
Total formal votes		9,734	95.5	−3.2
Informal votes		461	4.5	+4.3
Turnout		10,195	91.1	−0.8
Liberal and Country hold		Swing	+5.2	

=== Mount Marshall ===
1965 Western Australian state election: Mount Marshall
Party	Candidate	Votes	%	±%
Country	George Cornell	unopposed		
Country hold		Swing		

=== Murchison ===
1965 Western Australian state election: Murchison
Party	Candidate	Votes	%	±%
Liberal and Country	Richard Burt	2,824	63.5	+8.3
Labor	Tom Hartrey	1,626	36.5	−1.7
Total formal votes		4,450	97.2	−1.8
Informal votes		128	2.8	+1.8
Turnout		4,578	86.7	−3.3
Liberal and Country hold		Swing	+2.9	

=== Murray ===
1965 Western Australian state election: Murray
Party	Candidate	Votes	%	±%
Liberal and Country	Ewart Runciman	3,181	63.8	+23.9
Independent	Dudley Tuckey	1,808	36.2	+25.7
Total formal votes		4,989	95.9	−2.8
Informal votes		212	4.1	+2.8
Turnout		5,201	94.1	+4.1
Liberal and Country hold		Swing	N/A	

=== Narrogin ===
1965 Western Australian state election: Narrogin
Party	Candidate	Votes	%	±%
Country	William Manning	3,958	80.5	−19.5
Independent	Percy Munday	957	19.5	+19.5
Total formal votes		4,915	96.4	
Informal votes		184	3.6	
Turnout		5,099	93.3	
Country hold		Swing		

=== Nedlands ===
1965 Western Australian state election: Nedlands
Party	Candidate	Votes	%	±%
Liberal and Country	Charles Court	7,790	80.9	+9.5
Labor	Alastair Rae	1,835	19.1	−9.5
Total formal votes		9,625	97.1	−2.1
Informal votes		291	2.9	+2.1
Turnout		9,916	91.6	+1.3
Liberal and Country hold		Swing	+9.5	

=== Northam ===
1965 Western Australian state election: Northam
Party	Candidate	Votes	%	±%
Labor	Albert Hawke	3,078	57.9	−42.1
Liberal and Country	Claude Roediger	2,240	42.1	+42.1
Total formal votes		5,318	99.2	
Informal votes		43	0.8	
Turnout		5,361	92.7	
Labor hold		Swing	N/A	

=== Perth ===
1965 Western Australian state election: Perth
Party	Candidate	Votes	%	±%
Liberal and Country	Peter Durack	4,428	47.4	+7.0
Labor	Stanley Heal	4,422	47.3	−6.1
Democratic Labor	Terence Merchant	491	5.3	−0.9
Total formal votes		9,341	96.0	−1.5
Informal votes		392	4.0	+1.5
Turnout		9,733	87.5	−2.5
Two-party-preferred result
Liberal and Country	Peter Durack	4,774	51.1	+5.4
Labor	Stanley Heal	4,567	48.9	−5.4
Liberal and Country gain from Labor		Swing	+5.4	

=== Pilbara ===
1965 Western Australian state election: Pilbara
Party	Candidate	Votes	%	±%
Labor	Arthur Bickerton	976	67.2	−32.8
Liberal and Country	David Hughes	476	32.8	+32.8
Total formal votes		1,383	95.5	
Informal votes		69	4.5	
Turnout		1,521	79.6	
Labor hold		Swing	N/A	

=== Roe ===
1965 Western Australian state election: Roe
Party	Candidate	Votes	%	±%
Country	Tom Hart	unopposed		
Country hold		Swing		

=== South Perth ===
1965 Western Australian state election: South Perth
Party	Candidate	Votes	%	±%
Liberal and Country	Bill Grayden	unopposed		
Liberal and Country hold		Swing		

=== Stirling ===
1965 Western Australian state election: Stirling
Party	Candidate	Votes	%	±%
Country	Clayton Mitchell	unopposed		
Country hold		Swing		

=== Subiaco ===
1965 Western Australian state election: Subiaco
Party	Candidate	Votes	%	±%
Liberal and Country	Hugh Guthrie	5,274	53.3	+5.7
Labor	Frank Baden-Powell	4,040	40.9	−2.5
Democratic Labor	John Martyr	573	5.8	−3.1
Total formal votes		9,887	97.5	−1.1
Informal votes		258	2.5	+1.1
Turnout		10,145	91.7	−0.7
Two-party-preferred result
Liberal and Country	Hugh Guthrie	5,761	58.3	+3.2
Labor	Frank Baden-Powell	4,126	41.7	−3.2
Liberal and Country hold		Swing	+3.2	

=== Swan ===
1965 Western Australian state election: Swan
Party	Candidate	Votes	%	±%
Labor	John Brady	6,863	66.3	−25.5
Liberal and Country	Lindsay Ellis	3,208	31.0	+31.0
Communist	Gordon Murray	284	2.7	−5.5
Total formal votes		10,355	95.6	+3.5
Informal votes		474	4.4	−3.5
Turnout		10,829	92.6	−1.5
Two-party-preferred result
Labor	John Brady	7,119	68.7	−23.1
Liberal and Country	Lindsay Ellis	3,236	36.3	+36.3
Labor hold		Swing	N/A	

=== Toodyay ===
1965 Western Australian state election: Toodyay
Party	Candidate	Votes	%	±%
Country	James Craig	3,588	74.2	+12.2
Independent	Charles Hooper	1,244	25.8	+25.8
Total formal votes		4,832	93.8	−4.3
Informal votes		317	6.2	+4.3
Turnout		5,149	91.2	+0.2
Country hold		Swing	N/A	

=== Vasse ===
1965 Western Australian state election: Vasse
Party	Candidate	Votes	%	±%
Liberal and Country	William Bovell	3,588	70.4	−29.6
Labor	Colin Smith	1,515	29.6	+29.6
Total formal votes		5,093	98.7	
Informal votes		65	1.3	
Turnout		5,158	95.4	
Liberal and Country hold		Swing	N/A	

=== Victoria Park ===
1965 Western Australian state election: Victoria Park
Party	Candidate	Votes	%	±%
Labor	Ron Davies	6,183	64.0	+0.1
Liberal and Country	Nicholas Di Lello	3,482	36.0	−0.1
Total formal votes		9,665	96.0	−3.0
Informal votes		401	4.0	+3.0
Turnout		10,066	92.1	−3.5
Labor hold		Swing	−0.1	

=== Warren ===
1965 Western Australian state election: Warren
Party	Candidate	Votes	%	±%
Labor	Joseph Rowberry	2,491	52.3	−3.6
Liberal and Country	William Brockman	1,887	39.6	−4.5
Country	Gordon Errington	381	8.0	+8.0
Total formal votes		4,759	97.4	−1.6
Informal votes		126	2.6	+1.6
Turnout		4,885	94.5	+0.4
Two-party-preferred result
Labor	Joseph Rowberry	2,529	53.1	−2.8
Liberal and Country	William Brockman	2,230	46.9	+2.8
Labor hold		Swing	−2.8	

=== Wellington ===
1965 Western Australian state election: Wellington
Party	Candidate	Votes	%	±%
Liberal and Country	Iven Manning	3,521	63.6	−36.4
Labor	Ivor Hill	2,013	36.4	+36.4
Total formal votes		5,534	96.0	
Informal votes		229	4.0	
Turnout		5,763	92.9	
Liberal and Country hold		Swing	N/A	

=== Wembley ===
1965 Western Australian state election: Wembley
Party	Candidate	Votes	%	±%
Liberal and Country	Guy Henn	8,466	69.6	−30.4
Labor	Denis Kemp	3,702	30.4	+30.4
Total formal votes		12,168	98.8	
Informal votes		142	1.2	
Turnout		12,310	94.5	
Liberal and Country hold		Swing	N/A	

== See also ==
- 1965 Western Australian state election
- Members of the Western Australian Legislative Assembly, 1965–1968
- Candidates of the 1965 Western Australian state election
