= Candidates of the 1953 Western Australian state election =

The 1953 Western Australian state election was held on 14 February 1953.

== Retiring Members ==
=== Labor ===
- Ted Needham (MLA) (North Perth)

=== Independent ===
- William Read (MLA) (Victoria Park)

== Legislative Assembly ==
Sitting members are shown in bold text. Successful candidates are highlighted in the relevant colour. Where there is possible confusion, an asterisk (*) is also used.

Electorate	Held by	Labor candidate	LCL candidate	Country candidate	Other candidates
Albany	Country	Karl Schulze		Leonard Hill	
Avon Valley	LCL		**James Mann**		
Blackwood	LCL		**John Hearman**		
Boulder	Labor	**Arthur Moir**			
Bunbury	Labor	**Frank Guthrie**			
Canning	LCL	Colin Jamieson	**Arthur Griffith**		
Claremont	LCL	Clifton Scott	**Charles North**		
Collie	Labor	**Harry May**			
Cottesloe	LCL	Diana Hart	**Ross Hutchinson**		
Dale	LCL	Ronald Knowler	**Gerald Wild**		
Darling Range	Country	John Rolinson		Ray Owen	Herbert Small (Ind. Lib)
East Perth	Labor	**Herb Graham**			
Eyre	Labor	**Emil Nulsen**			
Fremantle	Labor	**Joseph Sleeman**			Paddy Troy (Comm.)
Gascoyne	Ind. Lib	Daniel Norton	Robert Iles		**Noel Butcher** (Ind. Lib)
Geraldton	Labor	**Bill Sewell**	James McAleer; Samuel Davey		Joyce Webber (Ind.)
Greenough	LCL	James Clune	**David Brand**		
Guildford-Midland	Labor	**John Brady**			Albert Marks (Comm.)
Hannans	Labor	**Herbert McCulloch**			Harold Illingworth (Ind.)
Harvey	LCL	Robert McCallum	**Iven Manning**		
Kalgoorlie	Labor	**Herbert Styants**			
Katanning	Country			Crawford Nalder	
Kimberley	Labor	**Aubrey Coverley**			
Leederville	Labor	**Ted Johnson**	Jessie Robertson		
Maylands	LCL	Owen Hanlon	**Edward Oldfield**		Samuel Spence (Ind.)
Melville	Labor	**John Tonkin**			James Collins (Ind.); James Hart (Ind.)
Merredin-Yilgarn	Labor	**Lionel Kelly**			
Middle Swan	Labor	**James Hegney**			
Moore	Country			John Ackland	
Mount Hawthorn	Labor	**Bill Hegney**	Leonard Seaton		
Mount Lawley	LCL		**Arthur Abbott**		Edward Zeffertt (Ind.)
Mount Marshall	Country			George Cornell	
Murchison	Labor	**Everard O'Brien**	John Porteus; John Thompson		
Murray	LCL	Frederick Kidby	**Ross McLarty**		
Narrogin	Country			Victor Doney	
Nedlands	Ind. Lib	Margaret Pitt Morison	Charles Court*; Peter Aldred; Sidney Bedells		**David Grayden** (Ind. Lib); Noel Symington (Ind.)
North Perth	Labor	Stan Lapham	Florence Hummerston		
Northam	Labor	**Albert Hawke**			
Pilbara	Labor	**Alec Rodoreda**	Rowland Charlton		
Roe	Country			Charles Perkins	
South Fremantle	Labor	**Dick Lawrence**			
South Perth	LCL	Francis French	**George Yates**		Carlyle Ferguson (Ind.)
Stirling	Country			Arthur Watts	
Subiaco	LCL	Thomas Henley	**Florence Cardell-Oliver**		
Toodyay	Country			Lindsay Thorn	
Vasse	LCL		**William Bovell**		
Victoria Park	Ind. Lib	Hugh Andrew	George Kerr		Harold Hawthorne (Ind.); Neil Payne (Comm.)
Warren	Labor	**Ernest Hoar**			
Wembley Beaches	LCL	Eric Hall	**Les Nimmo**		
West Perth	LCL	Stanley Heal	**Joseph Totterdell**		

== See also ==
- Members of the Western Australian Legislative Assembly, 1950–1953
- Members of the Western Australian Legislative Assembly, 1953–1956
- 1953 Western Australian state election
