= Members of the Western Australian Legislative Assembly, 1953–1956 =

This is a list of members of the Western Australian Legislative Assembly between the 1953 election and the 1956 election, together known as the 21st Parliament.

Name	Party	District	Years in office
Arthur Abbott	Liberal	Mount Lawley	1939–1956
John Ackland	Country	Moore	1947–1958
Hugh Andrew	Labor	Victoria Park	1953–1961
Stewart Bovell	Liberal	Vasse	1947–1971
John Brady	Labor	Guildford-Midland	1948–1974
David Brand	Liberal	Greenough	1945–1975
Dame Florence Cardell-Oliver	Liberal	Subiaco	1936–1956
George Cornell	Country	Mount Marshall	1947–1967
Charles Court	Liberal	Nedlands	1953–1982
Aubrey Coverley^{[1]}	Labor	Kimberley	1924–1953
Victor Doney	Country	Narrogin	1928–1956
Herb Graham	Labor	East Perth	1943–1973
Frank Guthrie^{[2]}	Labor	Bunbury	1950–1955
Albert Hawke	Labor	Northam	1933–1968
Stanley Heal	Labor	West Perth	1953–1965
John Hearman	Liberal	Blackwood	1950–1968
Bill Hegney	Labor	Mount Hawthorn	1939–1968
James Hegney	Labor	Middle Swan	1930–1947; 1950–1968
Leonard Hill	Country	Albany	1936–1956
Ernest Hoar	Labor	Warren	1943–1957
Ross Hutchinson	Liberal	Cottesloe	1950–1977
Colin Jamieson	Labor	Canning	1953–1986
Ted Johnson	Labor	Leederville	1952–1959
Lionel Kelly	Labor	Merredin-Yilgarn	1941–1968
Stan Lapham	Labor	North Perth	1953–1959; 1968–1974
Dick Lawrence	Labor	South Fremantle	1951–1960
James Mann	Liberal	Avon Valley	1930–1962
Iven Manning	Liberal	Harvey	1950–1974
Harry May	Labor	Collie	1947–1968
Herbert McCulloch	Labor	Hannans	1949–1956
Sir Ross McLarty	Liberal	Murray	1930–1962
Arthur Moir	Labor	Boulder	1951–1971
Crawford Nalder	Country	Katanning	1947–1974
Les Nimmo	Liberal	Wembley Beaches	1947–1956; 1959–1968
Charles North	Liberal	Claremont	1924–1956
Daniel Norton	Labor	Gascoyne	1953–1974
Emil Nulsen	Labor	Eyre	1932–1962
Everard O'Brien	Labor	Murchison	1952–1959
Edward Oldfield	Liberal	Maylands	1951–1965
Ray Owen	Country	Darling Range	1944–1947; 1950–1962
Charles Perkins	Country	Roe	1942–1962
John Rhatigan^{[1]}	Labor	Kimberley	1953–1968
George Roberts^{[2]}	Liberal	Bunbury	1955–1962
Alec Rodoreda	Labor	Pilbara	1933–1958
Bill Sewell	Labor	Geraldton	1950–1974
Joseph Sleeman	Labor	Fremantle	1924–1959
Herbert Styants	Labor	Kalgoorlie	1936–1956
Lindsay Thorn	Country	Toodyay	1930–1959
John Tonkin	Labor	Melville	1933–1977
Arthur Watts	Country	Stirling	1935–1962
Gerald Wild	Liberal	Dale	1947–1965
George Yates	Liberal	South Perth	1947–1956

== Notes ==
^{1} On 19 March 1953, the Labor member for Kimberley, Aubrey Coverley, died. Labor candidate John Rhatigan won the resulting by-election on 16 May 1953.
^{2} On 21 September 1955, the Labor member for Bunbury, Frank Guthrie, died. Liberal candidate George Roberts won the resulting by-election on 29 October 1955.

== Sources ==
- "Former Members" (PDF). Parliament of Western Australia. 2011. Archived from the original (PDF) on 7 August 2011.
