= Electoral results for the district of Wembley Beaches =

Western Australian district election results

This is a list of electoral results for the Electoral district of Wembley Beaches in Western Australian state elections.

== Members for Wembley Beaches ==
Member	Party	Term
Les Nimmo	Liberal Country League	1950–1956
Frederick Marshall	Labor	1956–1959
Les Nimmo	Liberal Country League	1959–1962

== Election results ==
=== Elections in the 1950s ===
1959 Western Australian state election: Wembley Beaches
Party	Candidate	Votes	%	±%
Liberal and Country	Les Nimmo	7,884	52.0	+14.5
Labor	Frederick Marshall	5,951	39.3	−10.2
Democratic Labor	William Coyne	1,327	8.8	+8.8
Total formal votes		15,162	98.6	+0.9
Informal votes		212	1.4	−0.9
Turnout		15,374	95.2	+0.2
Two-party-preferred result
Liberal and Country	Les Nimmo		59.4	+11.3
Labor	Frederick Marshall		40.6	−11.3
Liberal and Country gain from Labor		Swing	+11.3	

- Two party preferred vote was estimated.

1956 Western Australian state election: Wembley Beaches
Party	Candidate	Votes	%	±%
Labor	Frederick Marshall	5,492	49.5	
Liberal and Country	Bertha Beecroft	4,158	37.5	
Independent Liberal	Sydney Cheek	919	8.3	
Independent	Les Laracy	531	4.8	
Total formal votes		11,100	97.7	
Informal votes		255	2.3	
Turnout		11,355	95.0	
Two-party-preferred result
Labor	Frederick Marshall		51.9	
Liberal and Country	Bertha Beecroft		48.1	
Labor gain from Liberal and Country		Swing		

1953 Western Australian state election: Wembley Beaches
Party	Candidate	Votes	%	±%
Liberal and Country	Les Nimmo	6,204	57.7	−4.8
Labor	Eric Hall	4,556	42.3	+4.8
Total formal votes		10,760	98.8	+0.4
Informal votes		134	1.2	−0.4
Turnout		10,894	95.5	+3.6
Liberal and Country hold		Swing	−4.8	

1950 Western Australian state election: Wembley Beaches
Party	Candidate	Votes	%	±%
Liberal and Country	Les Nimmo	4,830	62.5	
Labor	Richard Knox	2,899	37.5	
Total formal votes		7,729	98.4	
Informal votes		122	1.6	
Turnout		7,851	91.9	
Liberal and Country hold		Swing		
