= Electoral results for the district of Mount Hawthorn =

Western Australian district election results

This is a list of electoral results for the Electoral district of Mount Hawthorn in Western Australian state elections.

== Members for Mount Hawthorn ==
Member	Party	Term
Harry Millington	Labor	1930–1947
Les Nimmo	Liberal	1947–1949
Les Nimmo	Liberal Country League	1949–1950
Bill Hegney	Labor	1950–1968
Ron Bertram	Labor	1968–1983

== Election results ==
=== Elections in the 1980s ===
1980 Western Australian state election: Mount Hawthorn
Party	Candidate	Votes	%	±%
Labor	Ron Bertram	8,343	59.7	+2.2
Liberal	Anne Klatt	5,632	40.3	−2.2
Total formal votes		13,975	96.1	+0.4
Informal votes		570	3.9	−0.4
Turnout		14,545	86.5	−3.2
Labor hold		Swing	+2.2	

=== Elections in the 1970s ===
1977 Western Australian state election: Mount Hawthorn
Party	Candidate	Votes	%	±%
Labor	Ronald Bertram	8,249	57.5	
Liberal	Brian Morris	6,105	42.5	
Total formal votes		14,354	95.7	
Informal votes		638	4.3	
Turnout		14,992	89.7	
Labor hold		Swing	+0.8	

1974 Western Australian state election: Mount Hawthorn
Party	Candidate	Votes	%	±%
Labor	Ron Bertram	7,447	54.7	
Liberal	Timothy Foley	5,256	38.6	
National Alliance	Peter Tilley	903	6.6	
Total formal votes		13,606	95.3	
Informal votes		663	4.7	
Turnout		14,269	90.6	
Two-party-preferred result
Labor	Ron Bertram	7,582	55.7	
Liberal	Timothy Foley	6,024	44.3	
Labor hold		Swing		

1971 Western Australian state election: Mount Hawthorn
Party	Candidate	Votes	%	±%
Labor	Ron Bertram	6,682	55.5	+2.6
Liberal	John Bulbeck	3,814	31.7	−7.1
Democratic Labor	Patrick Cranley	1,546	12.8	+4.6
Total formal votes		12,042	95.7	+0.3
Informal votes		540	4.3	−0.3
Turnout		12,582	91.2	−0.8
Two-party-preferred result
Labor	Ron Bertram	6,914	57.4	+3.2
Liberal	John Bulbeck	5,128	42.6	−3.2
Labor hold		Swing	+3.2	

=== Elections in the 1960s ===
1968 Western Australian state election: Mount Hawthorn
Party	Candidate	Votes	%	±%
Labor	Ron Bertram	5,831	52.9	
Liberal and Country	James Ring	4,279	38.9	
Democratic Labor	Gavan O'Connor	905	8.2	
Total formal votes		11,015	95.4	
Informal votes		528	4.6	
Turnout		11,543	92.0	
Two-party-preferred result
Labor	Ron Bertram	5,967	54.2	
Liberal and Country	James Ring	5,048	45.8	
Labor hold		Swing		

1965 Western Australian state election: Mount Hawthorn
Party	Candidate	Votes	%	±%
Labor	Bill Hegney	5,175	52.7	−3.5
Liberal and Country	James Ring	4,641	47.3	+3.5
Total formal votes		9,816	96.3	−2.3
Informal votes		377	3.7	+2.3
Turnout		10,193	91.8	−1.2
Labor hold		Swing	−3.5	

1962 Western Australian state election: Mount Hawthorn
Party	Candidate	Votes	%	±%
Labor	Bill Hegney	5,866	56.2	
Liberal and Country	Hugh O'Doherty	4,571	43.8	
Total formal votes		10,437	98.6	
Informal votes		153	1.4	
Turnout		10,590	93.0	
Labor hold		Swing		

=== Elections in the 1950s ===
1959 Western Australian state election: Mount Hawthorn
Party	Candidate	Votes	%	±%
Labor	Bill Hegney	6,406	56.3	−6.7
Liberal and Country	Hugh O'Doherty	4,795	42.1	+8.8
Communist	Edward Zeffertt	183	1.6	−2.1
Total formal votes		11,384	96.6	+0.5
Informal votes		398	3.4	−0.5
Turnout		11,782	93.4	+0.6
Two-party-preferred result
Labor	Bill Hegney		57.7	−8.6
Liberal and Country	Hugh O'Doherty		42.3	+8.6
Labor hold		Swing	−8.6	

1956 Western Australian state election: Mount Hawthorn
Party	Candidate	Votes	%	±%
Labor	Bill Hegney	5,740	63.0	
Liberal and Country	William Bailey	3,032	33.3	
Communist	William Anear	333	3.7	
Total formal votes		9,105	96.1	
Informal votes		367	3.9	
Turnout		9,472	92.8	
Two-party-preferred result
Labor	Bill Hegney		66.3	
Liberal and Country	William Bailey		33.7	
Labor hold		Swing		

1953 Western Australian state election: Mount Hawthorn
Party	Candidate	Votes	%	±%
Labor	Bill Hegney	6,473	65.6	+11.5
Liberal and Country	Leonard Seaton	3,396	34.4	−8.6
Total formal votes		9,869	98.0	+1.4
Informal votes		198	2.0	−1.4
Turnout		10,067	94.2	+1.5
Labor hold		Swing	+9.5	

1950 Western Australian state election: Mount Hawthorn
Party	Candidate	Votes	%	±%
Labor	Bill Hegney	4,680	54.1	
Liberal and Country	John Mann	3,725	43.1	
Independent Labor	John Plummer-Leitch	247	2.9	
Total formal votes		8,652	96.6	
Informal votes		301	3.4	
Turnout		8,953	92.7	
Two-party-preferred result
Labor	Bill Hegney		56.1	
Liberal and Country	John Mann		43.9	
Labor hold		Swing		

- Two party preferred vote was estimated.

=== Elections in the 1940s ===
1947 Western Australian state election: Mount Hawthorn
Party	Candidate	Votes	%	±%
Liberal	Les Nimmo	5,594	45.3	+12.0
Labor	William Beadle	5,400	43.8	−22.9
Independent	Archibald Cruikshank	920	7.5	+7.5
Country	Norman Hard	281	2.3	+2.3
	Arthur West	145	1.2	+1.2
Total formal votes		12,340	96.3	−0.7
Informal votes		479	3.7	+0.7
Turnout		12,819	85.6	−3.1
Two-party-preferred result
Liberal	Les Nimmo	6,313	51.2	+17.9
Labor	William Beadle	6,027	48.8	−17.9
Liberal gain from Labor		Swing	+17.9	

1943 Western Australian state election: Mount Hawthorn
Party	Candidate	Votes	%	±%
Labor	Harry Millington	7113	66.7	+8.1
Nationalist	Norman Hard	3,549	33.3	−8.1
Total formal votes		10,662	97.0	−0.9
Informal votes		327	3.0	+0.9
Turnout		10,989	88.7	−4.9
Labor hold		Swing	+8.1	

=== Elections in the 1930s ===
1939 Western Australian state election: Mount Hawthorn
Party	Candidate	Votes	%	±%
Labor	Harry Millington	5,100	58.6	+4.6
Nationalist	Guildford Clarke	3,607	41.4	−4.6
Total formal votes		8,707	97.9	−1.2
Informal votes		182	2.1	+1.2
Turnout		8,889	93.6	+20.7
Labor hold		Swing	+4.6	

1936 Western Australian state election: Mount Hawthorn
Party	Candidate	Votes	%	±%
Labor	Harry Millington	2,751	54.0	−8.5
Nationalist	Arthur Abbott	2,345	46.0	+8.5
Total formal votes		5,096	99.1	+1.2
Informal votes		46	0.9	−1.2
Turnout		5,142	72.9	−21.4
Labor hold		Swing	−8.5	

1933 Western Australian state election: Mount Hawthorn
Party	Candidate	Votes	%	±%
Labor	Harry Millington	3,512	62.5	+9.0
Nationalist	Hugh Henderson	2,107	37.5	−9.0
Total formal votes		5,619	97.9	−0.8
Informal votes		123	2.1	+0.8
Turnout		5,742	94.3	+17.0
Labor hold		Swing	+9.0	

1930 Western Australian state election: Mount Hawthorn
Party	Candidate	Votes	%	±%
Labor	Harry Millington	2,002	53.5	
Nationalist	Peter Menzies	1,739	46.5	
Total formal votes		3,741	98.7	
Informal votes		48	1.3	
Turnout		3,789	77.3	
Labor hold		Swing		
