= Electoral results for the district of Karrinyup =

Western Australian district election results

This is a list of electoral results for the Electoral district of Karrinyup in Western Australian state elections.

== Members for Karrinyup ==
Member	Party	Term
Les Nimmo	Liberal Country League	1962–1968
Stan Lapham	Labor	1968–1974
Jim Clarko	Liberal	1974–1989

== Election results ==
=== Elections in the 1980s ===
1986 Western Australian state election: Karrinyup
Party	Candidate	Votes	%	±%
Liberal	Jim Clarko	11,163	56.3	+3.8
Labor	Ian Noack	8,649	43.7	+3.0
Total formal votes		19,812	98.0	+0.1
Informal votes		410	2.0	−0.1
Turnout		20,222	92.8	+3.5
Liberal hold		Swing	+0.4	

1983 Western Australian state election: Karrinyup
Party	Candidate	Votes	%	±%
Liberal	Jim Clarko	8,481	52.5	
Labor	Richard Pitts	6,580	40.7	
Democrats	Jean Jenkins	1,106	6.8	
Total formal votes		16,167	97.9	
Informal votes		346	2.1	
Turnout		16,513	89.3	
Two-party-preferred result
Liberal	Jim Clarko	9,037	55.9	
Labor	Richard Pitts	7,130	44.1	
Liberal hold		Swing		

1980 Western Australian state election: Karrinyup
Party	Candidate	Votes	%	±%
Liberal	Jim Clarko	9,284	58.5	−2.5
Labor	Evan McKenzie	6,597	41.5	+2.5
Total formal votes		15,881	97.5	0.0
Informal votes		406	2.5	0.0
Turnout		16,287	88.8	−2.8
Liberal hold		Swing	−2.5	

=== Elections in the 1970s ===
1977 Western Australian state election: Karrinyup
Party	Candidate	Votes	%	±%
Liberal	Jim Clarko	8,963	61.0	
Labor	Peter Rose	5,738	39.0	
Total formal votes		14,701	97.5	
Informal votes		369	2.5	
Turnout		15,070	91.6	
Liberal hold		Swing	+7.5	

1974 Western Australian state election: Karrinyup
Party	Candidate	Votes	%	±%
Liberal	Jim Clarko	8,782	48.7	
Labor	Mervyn Knight	8,090	44.9	
National Alliance	Laurence Butterly	1,145	6.4	
Total formal votes		18,017	96.3	
Informal votes		695	3.7	
Turnout		18,712	91.5	
Two-party-preferred result
Liberal	Jim Clarko	9,728	54.0	
Labor	Mervyn Knight	8,289	46.0	
Liberal gain from Labor		Swing		

1971 Western Australian state election: Karrinyup
Party	Candidate	Votes	%	±%
Labor	Stan Lapham	7,132	49.9	−3.6
Liberal	Jim Clarko	5,939	41.6	+0.2
Democratic Labor	John Poole	1,215	8.5	+3.3
Total formal votes		14,286	97.8	+0.8
Informal votes		320	2.2	−0.8
Turnout		14,606	92.1	−0.3
Two-party-preferred result
Labor	Stan Lapham	7,421	52.0	−2.3
Liberal	Jim Clarko	6,865	48.0	+2.3
Labor hold		Swing	−2.3	

=== Elections in the 1960s ===
1968 Western Australian state election: Karrinyup
Party	Candidate	Votes	%	±%
Labor	Stan Lapham	5,720	53.5	
Liberal and Country	John Waghorne	4,422	41.3	
Democratic Labor	Arthur White	552	5.2	
Total formal votes		10,694	97.0	
Informal votes		332	3.0	
Turnout		11,026	92.4	
Two-party-preferred result
Labor	Stan Lapham	5,803	54.3	
Liberal and Country	John Waghorne	4,891	45.7	
Labor gain from Liberal and Country		Swing		

1965 Western Australian state election: Karrinyup
Party	Candidate	Votes	%	±%
Liberal and Country	Les Nimmo	6,291	51.8	+5.0
Labor	Stan Lapham	5,247	43.2	−3.4
Democratic Labor	Gerardus Sappelli	605	5.0	−1.6
Total formal votes		12,143	98.1	−1.0
Informal votes		230	1.9	+1.0
Turnout		12,373	93.3	−1.7
Two-party-preferred result
Liberal and Country	Les Nimmo	6,805	56.0	+3.5
Labor	Stan Lapham	5,338	44.0	−3.5
Liberal and Country hold		Swing	+3.5	

1962 Western Australian state election: Karrinyup
Party	Candidate	Votes	%	±%
Liberal and Country	Les Nimmo	4,843	46.8	
Labor	Stan Lapham	4,823	46.6	
Democratic Labor	Brian Peachey	685	6.6	
Total formal votes		10,351	99.1	
Informal votes		98	0.9	
Turnout		10,449	95.0	
Two-party-preferred result
Liberal and Country	Les Nimmo	5,437	52.5	
Labor	Stan Lapham	4,914	47.5	
Liberal and Country hold		Swing		
