= Electoral district of Karrinyup =

Former state electoral district of Perth, Western Australia

Karrinyup Western Australia—Legislative Assembly
- State: Western Australia
- Dates current: 1968–1989
- Namesake: Karrinyup

Karrinyup was an electoral district of the Legislative Assembly in the Australian state of Western Australia from 1962 to 1989.

The district was based in the beachside northern suburbs of Perth. First contested at the 1962 state election, it was won by Liberal Country League candidate Les Nimmo, who was at the time member for the abolished Wembley Beaches.

Karrinyup was abolished ahead of the 1989 state election. The then sitting member, Liberal MP Jim Clarko, successfully contested the new seat of Marmion.

== Members for Karrinyup ==
Member	Party	Term
Les Nimmo	Liberal Country League	1962–1968
Stan Lapham	Labor	1968–1974
Jim Clarko	Liberal	1974–1989
