= Joseph Rowberry =

Australian politician

Member of the Legislative Assembly of Western Australia
- In office 25 January 1958 – 23 March 1968
- Preceded by: Ernest Hoar
- Succeeded by: David Evans
- Constituency: Warren

Personal details
- Born: 13 May 1895 Inveresk, Midlothian, Scotland
- Died: 13 November 1972 (aged 77) Subiaco, Western Australia, Australia
- Party: Labor

Joseph Neon Rowberry (13 May 1895 – 13 November 1972) was an Australian trade unionist and politician who was a Labor Party member of the Legislative Assembly of Western Australia from 1958 to 1968, representing the seat of Warren.

Rowberry was born in Inveresk, Scotland, to Isabella (née Fraser) and Joseph Neon Rowberry. He worked as a coal miner after leaving school, and then served with the British Army during World War I, as a signalman with the 51st (Highland) Division. Rowberry arrived in Australia in 1925, and worked for periods as a farm labourer (in Gnowangerup), road worker (in Northcliffe), timber worker (in Pemberton), and traffic inspector (in Manjimup). He was vice-president of the Timber Workers' Union from 1945 to 1955. Rowberry entered parliament at the 1958 Warren by-election, caused by the resignation of Ernest Hoar (the sitting Labor member). He was re-elected at the 1959, 1962, and 1965 elections, and retired at the 1968 election, aged 72. Rowberry died in Perth in November 1972, aged 77. He had married twice, and had two children by his second wife.

Parliament of Western Australia
Preceded by Ernest Hoar	Member for Warren; 1958–1968	Succeeded by David Evans
