= Bill Gaffy =

Australian politician

Member of the Legislative Assembly of Western Australia
- In office 7 April 1956 – 21 March 1959
- Preceded by: Colin Jamieson
- Succeeded by: Des O'Neil
- Constituency: Canning

Personal details
- Born: 8 June 1898 Glen Osmond, South Australia, Australia
- Died: 8 August 1970 (aged 72) Riverton, Western Australia, Australia
- Party: Labor

William James Gaffy (8 June 1898 – 8 August 1970) was an Australian politician who was a Labor Party member of the Legislative Assembly of Western Australia from 1956 to 1959, representing the seat of Canning.

Gaffy was born in Adelaide, South Australia, to Margaret Mary (née Flanagan) and John Peter Gaffy. His parents moved to Western Australia when he was three years old. Before entering politics, Gaffy worked as a fitter and turner. He was employed at a munitions factory in Welshpool during World War II. Gaffy was elected to parliament at the 1956 state election. He was preselected for Canning in place of the sitting Labor member, Colin Jamieson (a future leader of the party), who transferred to the new seat of Beeloo. However, his time in parliament was short, as he lost his seat to the Liberal Party's Des O'Neil at the 1959 election. After leaving parliament, Gaffy found work as a government clerk. He died in Perth in August 1970, aged 72. He had married Ella Mavis Lance in 1943, although they had no children.

Parliament of Western Australia
Preceded by Colin Jamieson	Member for Canning; 1956–1959	Succeeded by Des O'Neil
