= William Manning (Australian politician) =

Australian politician

Member of the Legislative Assembly of Western Australia
- In office 7 April 1956 – 30 March 1974
- Preceded by: Victor Doney
- Succeeded by: Peter Jones
- Constituency: Narrogin

Personal details
- Born: 13 April 1903 Subiaco, Western Australia, Australia
- Died: 1 October 1986 (aged 83) Shenton Park, Western Australia, Australia
- Party: Country

William Alan Manning (13 April 1903 – 1 October 1986) was an Australian businessman and politician who was a Country Party member of the Legislative Assembly of Western Australia from 1956 to 1974, representing the seat of Narrogin.

Manning was born in Perth to Emily Elizabeth (née Lightfoot) and Albert Wheaton Manning. After leaving school, he trained as an accountant. He subsequently began working for the family business (a drapery in Narrogin), which he eventually took over. Manning was elected to the Narrogin Municipal Council in 1932, and served until 1941. He was later also mayor of the town from 1947 to 1951. Manning entered parliament at the 1956 state election. He was elected with a two-party-preferred figure of 65.5 percent, despite polling only 21.4 percent on first preferences (and initially being outpolled by another Country Party candidate).

After the 1959 election, where he increased his majority, Manning was made deputy chairman of committees in the Legislative Assembly. He was promoted to chairman of committees after the 1965 election, and served in the position until the end of 1970. During his time in parliament, Manning once gave a speech with a box of day-old chicks at his feet, to protest a decision by the Western Australian Government Railways to ban passengers from travelling with them. He left politics at the 1974 election, and died in October 1986, aged 83. He had married Isabella Rae Rattray in 1928, with whom he had four children.

Parliament of Western Australia
Preceded by Victor Doney	Member for Narrogin; 1956–1974	Succeeded by Peter Jones
