= Bill Crommelin =

Australian businessman and politician

Member of the Legislative Assembly of Western Australia
- In office 7 April 1956 – 23 March 1968
- Preceded by: Charles North
- Succeeded by: None (seat abolished)
- Constituency: Claremont

Personal details
- Born: 9 April 1903 West Perth, Western Australia
- Died: 20 May 1998 (aged 95) Claremont, Western Australia
- Party: Liberal

Harold William Crommelin (9 April 1903 – 20 May 1998) was an Australian businessman and politician who was a Liberal Party member of the Legislative Assembly of Western Australia from 1956 to 1968, representing the seat of Claremont.

== Early life and career ==
Crommelin was born in Perth to Annie Florence (née Loton) and Reginald Crommelin. His maternal grandfather was Sir William Loton, a member of parliament and Mayor of Perth. Crommelin attended Toowoomba Grammar School (in Queensland) and Hale School, and after leaving school worked as a farmer, eventually purchasing his own property near Pingelly. He later worked as a car salesman and accounting clerk, eventually becoming a partner in a clothing firm. During World War II, his company made greatcoats for the army. Crommelin was elected to the South Ward of the Claremont Municipal Council in 1953, and would serve as a councillor until 1963.

At the 1956 state election, Crommelin won the seat of Claremont, defeating two other Liberal candidates. One of those was the incumbent member, Charles North, who had held the seat for 32 years and was also a former Speaker of the Legislative Assembly. Crommelin was re-elected unopposed at the 1959 election and was subsequently made deputy chairman of committees in the Legislative Assembly. He held that position until his retirement at the 1968 election, which coincided with an electoral redistribution that abolished the seat of Claremont. Crommelin died in Perth in May 1998, aged 95. At the time of his death, only one other MP in Western Australia (Sir Leslie Diver) had lived to a greater age. Crommelin had married Peggy Noreen Taylor in 1926, with whom he had two sons.
