= Jack Hall (politician) =

Australian politician

Member of the Legislative Assembly of Western Australia
- In office 7 April 1956 – 14 April 1970
- Preceded by: Leonard Hill
- Succeeded by: Wyndham Cook
- Constituency: Albany

Personal details
- Born: 21 March 1910 Mount Malcolm, Western Australia, Australia
- Died: 5 May 1970 (aged 60) Perth, Western Australia, Australia
- Party: Labor

Jack Hall (21 March 1910 – 5 May 1970) was an Australian trade unionist and politician who was a Labor Party member of the Legislative Assembly of Western Australia from 1956 to 1970, representing the seat of Albany.

Hall was born in Mount Malcolm, a short-lived settlement in the Goldfields. He went to school in Albany, and was subsequently employed by Albany Woollen Mills (a textile firm). He eventually became president of the Albany branch of the Textile Workers' Union, serving for seven years . Hall entered parliament at the 1956 state election. He defeated Leonard Hill, the sitting Country Party member, by just 18 votes on the two-party-preferred count. At the 1959 election, Hall won an absolute majority on first preferences, a feat he repeated at three subsequent elections (in 1962, 1965, and 1968). Suffering from ill health, he resigned from parliament in April 1970, and died in Perth less than a month later. He had married Irene Pearl Sutherland in 1933, with whom he had four children.

Parliament of Western Australia
Preceded by Leonard Hill	Member for Albany; 1956–1970	Succeeded by Wyndham Cook
