= Frederick Marshall (politician) =

Australian politician

- Constituency: Wembley Beaches

Personal details
- Born: 6 June 1902 Grays, Essex, United Kingdom
- Died: 17 May 1975 (aged 72) Karrinyup, Western Australia
- Party: Labor
- Spouse: Irma Robson
- Profession: Electrical linesman

Frederick Marshall (6 June 1902 – 17 May 1975) was an Australian politician, and a member of the Western Australian Legislative Assembly from 1956 until 1959 representing the seats of Wembley Beaches.

== Biography ==
Marshall was born in Grays, Essex, England, to Benjamin Marshall, a general labourer and merchant seaman, and Jane née Rollingson, and was educated locally. In 1922, he arrived in Western Australia, living with his family in Victoria Park. On 2 June 1930, he married Irma Priest at St Andrews' Church in Subiaco, with whom he was to have two sons and three daughters.

In the 1930s, he worked as a labourer and storeman, and became a foreman of sustenance gangs during the Great Depression who were digging contoured channels on dams in the South West region. By 1938, he was working for the Department of Water Supplies, and moved frequently with his young family as work demanded. He signed up for the Royal Australian Air Force in 1941, but was rejected on medical grounds and was officially discharged on 9 February 1942. Around the same time, he settled in Innaloo and joined the Electricity and Gas Department of the Perth City Council (which became part of the State Electricity Commission soon afterwards) as a linesman's assistant, and in 1949 he was promoted to linesman. He also became involved in the Australasian Society of Engineers, in which he served as vice-president from 1947, and later as secretary.

At the 1956 state election on 7 April, he was elected for the Labor Party to the seat of Wembley Beaches, which had hitherto been considered a safe seat for the Liberal Party. The previous Liberal member, Les Nimmo, had decided to contest the seat of Leederville, and Marshall's strongest support came from his own suburb, where he obtained 66% of the vote. He resigned from his job at the State Electricity Commission and completed a term as a government backbencher. At the 1959 election, with a statewide swing to the Liberals and with Nimmo recontesting the seat, he was defeated.

After leaving politics he was employed by the Australasian Society of Engineers until 1962. Subsequently, he was re-employed by the SEC and relocated to Collie, Western Australia where he worked as clerk and then site clerk at Muja Power Station, before retiring in 1967.

He died on 17 May 1975 in Karrinyup and was cremated at Karrakatta Cemetery.

Preceded by Les Nimmo	Member for Wembley Beaches; 1956–1959	Succeeded by Les Nimmo
