= 1953 Western Australian state election =

- 14 February 1953

All 50 seats in the Western Australian Legislative Assembly 26 Assembly seats were needed for a majority
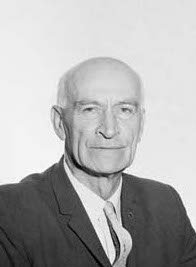

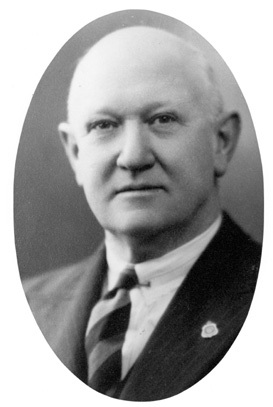
	First party	Second party
Leader	Albert Hawke	Ross McLarty
Party	Labor	Liberal/Country coalition
Leader since	3 July 1951	14 December 1946
Leader's seat	Northam	Murray-Wellington
Last election	23 seats	24 seats
Seats won	26 seats	24 seats
Seat change	▲3	0
Percentage	49.76%	42.86%
Swing	▲7.92	▼6.53
Premier before election
Ross McLarty
Liberal/Country coalition
Elected Premier
Albert Hawke
Labor

Elections were held in the state of Western Australia on 14 February 1953 to elect all 50 members to the Legislative Assembly. The two-term Liberal-Country Party coalition government, led by Premier Sir Ross McLarty, was defeated by the Labor Party, led by Opposition Leader Albert Hawke.

The election was notable in that 22 of the 50 seats were not contested at the election. Only two other elections—those held in 1890 and 1894—had a greater percentage or number of uncontested seats.

== Key dates ==
Date	Event
7 January 1953	The Legislative Council was prorogued and the Legislative Assembly was dissolved.
23 January 1953	Writs were issued by the Governor to proceed with an election.
30 January 1953	Close of nominations.
14 February 1953	Polling day, between the hours of 8am and 6pm.
23 February 1953	The McLarty–Watts Ministry resigned and the Hawke Ministry was sworn in.
27 February 1953	The writ was returned and the results formally declared.
6 August 1953	Parliament was summoned for business.

== Results ==
Western Australian state election, 14 February 1953 Legislative Assembly << 1950–1956 >>
Enrolled voters	205,644^{[1]}				
Votes cast	192,225		Turnout	93.47%	+0.86%
Informal votes	5,028		Informal	2.62%	+0.64%
Summary of votes by party
Party	Primary votes	%	Swing	Seats	Change
Labor	93,157	49.76%	+7.92%	26	+ 3
Liberal and Country	71,042	37.95%	–2.13%	15	± 0
Country	9,196	4.91%	–4.40%	9	± 0
Ind. Lib.	3,458	1.85%	–0.40%	0	– 2
Communist	1,350	0.72%	+0.36%	0	± 0
Independent	8,994	4.80%	–1.35%	0	– 1
Total	192,225			50	

^{1} 319,941 electors were enrolled to vote at the election, but 22 seats (44% of the total) were uncontested—12 Labor seats (six more than 1950) representing 65,993 enrolled voters, 3 Liberal seats (one more than 1950) representing 14,297 enrolled voters, and 7 Country seats (three more than 1950) representing 34,007 enrolled voters.

== See also ==
- Members of the Western Australian Legislative Assembly, 1950–1953
- Members of the Western Australian Legislative Assembly, 1953–1956
- Candidates of the 1953 Western Australian state election
