= Electoral district of Beeloo =

Former electoral district in Perth, Western Australia

Beeloo Western Australia—Legislative Assembly
- State: Western Australia
- Dates current: 1956–1968
- Namesake: Beeloo people

Beeloo was an electoral district of the Legislative Assembly in the Australian state of Western Australia from 1956 to 1968. Beeloo was named after the Beeloo, a subgroup of the Whadjuk Nyungar people, who inhabited an area that later became the south eastern suburbs of Perth, south of the Swan and east of the Canning, prior to European settlement.

Beeloo was considered to be a safe seat for the Labor Party, and only had one member, Colin Jamieson.

== History ==
Beeloo was initially within the vast electorate of Canning. In 1911, 50 people voted at the Belmont and Welshpool Road booths, and by 1950, this had grown to 410 at Belmont, 685 at Welshpool and 692 at Queens Park. However, the area grew rapidly following the Second World War as industry developed at Belmont, Kewdale and Forrestfield, and Housing Commission areas were built to support them. At the 1955 redistribution, the new electorate of Beeloo was created—the only district to be so created. The previous member for Canning, Labor member Colin Jamieson who was first elected in 1953, secured the seat at the 1956 election.

At the 1962 election, Beeloo moved further south into Cannington and Queens Park, whilst a new seat of Belmont was created.

At the redistribution taking effect from the 1968 election, Beeloo was abolished, and Belmont shifted southwards. Jamieson successfully transferred to Belmont at the election.

== Members for Beeloo ==
Member	Party	Term
Colin Jamieson	Labor	1956–1968
