= John Rhatigan =

Australian politician

Member of the Legislative Assembly of Western Australia
- In office 16 May 1953 – 23 March 1968
- Preceded by: Aubrey Coverley
- Succeeded by: Alan Ridge
- Constituency: Kimberley

Personal details
- Born: 18 June 1907 Turkey Creek, Western Australia
- Died: 9 November 1970 (aged 63) Subiaco, Western Australia
- Party: Labor

John Joseph Rhatigan (18 June 1907 – 9 November 1970) was an Australian politician who was a Labor Party member of the Legislative Assembly of Western Australia from 1953 to 1968, representing the seat of Kimberley.

== Biography ==
John Rhatigan was born on 18 June 1907 in Turkey Creek (now known as Warmun), a small inland community in Western Australia's Kimberley region. His father was Michael "Mick" Rhatigan, a stockman, telegraph linesman and police constable, who was involved in the shooting of a group of Aboriginal people at Turkey Creek in 1915 known as the Mistake Creek massacre, as well as other killings of Aboriginal people for cattle theft. He died when John was 16.

Rhatigan was sent away to be educated, boarding at Christian Brothers' College, Perth for two and a half years, returning to the Kimberley after leaving school. He joined the Department of Native Affairs in 1946, having earlier worked as a stockman, linesman, drover, and cattle station manager. From 1949, Rhatigan served as the district officer for the entire East Kimberley region, and was based in Broome.

He resigned to contest the 1953 Kimberley by-election, which had been caused by the death of the sitting Labor member, Aubrey Coverley. Rhatigan was successful, becoming the first member for Kimberley born in the region, and went on to hold the seat until his defeat at the 1968 state election.

He died on 9 November 1970 in Subiaco.

Parliament of Western Australia
Preceded by Aubrey Coverley	Member for Kimberley; 1953–1968	Succeeded by Alan Ridge
