= Ernest Hoar =

Australian politician

Ernest Knight Hoar (20 October 1898 – 1 May 1979) was an Australian politician. He was a Labor member of the Western Australian Legislative Assembly from 1943 to 1957, representing Nelson until 1950 and Warren-Blackwood thereafter. He served as Minister for Lands and Agriculture from 1953 to 1957.
