= Les Nimmo =

Australian politician

Member of the Legislative Assembly of Western Australia
- In office 15 March 1947 – 25 March 1950
- Preceded by: Harry Millington
- Succeeded by: Bill Hegney
- Constituency: Mount Hawthorn
- In office 25 March 1950 – 7 April 1956
- Preceded by: None (new seat)
- Succeeded by: Frederick Marshall
- Constituency: Wembley Beaches
- In office 21 March 1959 – 31 March 1962
- Preceded by: Frederick Marshall
- Succeeded by: None (seat abolished)
- Constituency: Wembley Beaches
- In office 31 March 1962 – 23 March 1968
- Preceded by: None (new seat)
- Succeeded by: Stan Lapham
- Constituency: Karrinyup

Personal details
- Born: 23 February 1897 Hobart, Tasmania, Australia
- Died: 6 November 1972 (aged 75) Shenton Park, Western Australia, Australia
- Party: Liberal

Leslie Charles "Les" Nimmo (23 February 1897 – 6 November 1972) was an Australian politician who was a Liberal Party member of the Legislative Assembly of Western Australia from 1947 to 1956 and again from 1959 to 1968.

Nimmo was born in Hobart, Tasmania, to Frances (née Grahame) and James Nimmo. He served with the Royal Australian Navy during World War I, and on his return to Hobart worked as a shop assistant. Nimmo moved to Perth in 1930, and began working for a department store, where he eventually became a manager. He entered parliament at the 1947 state election, narrowly winning the inner-city seat of Mount Hawthorn from the Labor Party. At the 1950 election, Nimmo transferred to the new seat of Wembley Beaches, with his old seat reverting to the Labor Party. He again attempted to move seats at the 1956 election, but was defeated in the seat of Leederville by the sitting member, Labor's Ted Johnson. A Labor candidate, Frederick Marshall, also won in Wembley Beaches, but Nimmo reclaimed that seat at the 1959 election. However, Wembley Beaches was abolished prior to the 1962 election, forcing another change of seats to the new Karrinyup electorate. Nimmo held Karrinyup until his retirement at the 1968 election. He died in Perth in November 1972, aged 75. He was married twice, having two children by his first wife and then remarrying at the age of 67 following her death.

Parliament of Western Australia
Preceded by Harry Millington	Member for Mount Hawthorn; 1947–1950	Succeeded by Bill Hegney
Preceded by None (new seat); Frederick Marshall	Member for Wembley Beaches; 1950–1956; 1959–1962	Succeeded by Frederick Marshall; None (abolished)
New seat	Member for Karrinyup; 1962–1968	Succeeded by Stan Lapham
