= Electoral district of Harvey =

Former electoral district of Western Australia

Harvey Western Australia—Legislative Assembly
- State: Western Australia
- Dates current: 1950–1962
- Namesake: Harvey

Harvey was an electoral district of the Legislative Assembly in the Australian state of Western Australia from 1950 to 1962.

The district was based on the town of Harvey lying to the south of Perth.

The seat's only member was Liberal-Country League MP Iven Manning, who went on to become the member for Wellington after its abolition.

== Members ==
Member	Party	Term
Iven Manning	Liberal Country League	1950–1962
