= Bill Hegney =

Australian politician

The Honourable Bill Hegney

Member of the Legislative Assembly of Western Australia
- In office 18 March 1939 – 25 March 1950
- Preceded by: Frank Welsh
- Succeeded by: Aloysius Rodoreda
- Constituency: Pilbara
- In office 25 March 1950 – 23 March 1968
- Preceded by: Les Nimmo
- Succeeded by: Ron Bertram
- Constituency: Mount Hawthorn

Personal details
- Born: 11 January 1896 Melbourne, Victoria, Australia
- Died: 13 October 1982 (aged 86) Hilton, Western Australia, Australia
- Party: Labor

William Hegney (11 January 1896 – 13 October 1982) was an Australian politician who was a Labor Party member of the Legislative Assembly of Western Australia from 1939 to 1968. He served as a minister in the government of Albert Hawke.

== Biography ==
Hegney was born in Melbourne, as was his older brother James (also a future MP). The brothers came to Western Australia as children, where their father worked for Western Australian Government Railways. Hegney initially worked as a clerk with the Taxation Department, but later moved to the country, working as a shear and labourer. From 1920, he was the secretary and organiser of the Australian Workers' Union (AWU) in Northam, with responsibility for much of regional Western Australia. At the 1927 state election, Hegney ran against Sir James Mitchell, the Leader of the Opposition, losing by only a small margin. He was soon after elected to the state executive of the AWU, and eventually elected as a delegate from Western Australia to the AWU national executive council.

At the 1939 state election, Hegney was elected to the seat of Pilbara, defeating the sitting Nationalist member, Frank Welsh. At the 1947 election, he defeated an independent candidate, Leonard Taplin, by only a single vote, a result that was subsequently overturned by the Court of Disputed Returns. He went on to win the resulting by-election, keeping his seat. Hegney switched to the seat of Mount Hawthorn (located within the Perth metropolitan area) at the 1950 election. His old seat was won by Aloysius Rodoreda, the former member for Roebourne. After Labor's victory at the 1953 election, Hegney was made Minister for Native Welfare, Minister for Labour, and Minister for Prices in the Hawke government. After the 1956 election, his titles were Minister for Labour and Minister for Education, which he held until the defeat of the Labor government three years later. Hegney remained in parliament until his retirement at the 1968 election.

Parliament of Western Australia
Preceded by Frank Welsh	Member for Pilbara; 1939–1950	Succeeded by Aloysius Rodoreda
Preceded by Les Nimmo	Member for Mount Hawthorn; 1962–1968	Succeeded by Ron Bertram
Political offices
Preceded by Victor Doney	Minister for Native Welfare; 1953–1956	Succeeded by John Brady
Preceded by Arthur Abbott	Minister for Prices; 1953–1954	Abolished
Preceded by Lindsay Thorn	Minister for Labour; 1953–1959	Succeeded by Charles Perkins
Preceded by John Tonkin	Minister for Education; 1956–1959	Succeeded by Arthur Watts
