= Ted Johnson (politician) =

Australian politician

Stephen Edward Ingram Johnson (17 February 1909 – 2002) was an Australian politician.

Born in Derbyshire to Stephen Henry Johnson, a schoolteacher, and Barbara Foster-Barham, Johnson and his family migrated to Fremantle in 1912. Johnson worked in various temporary jobs before becoming a bank officer. He enlisted in the Australian Imperial Force in 1941 and served with the 44th Battalion and 35th Training Battalion. He was promoted lieutenant in October and discharged in July 1946. On 4 December 1937 he married Winifred Mabel McNaughton in South Perth; she died on 3 April 1975, and Johnson married Edna Pockrass on 14 February 1976. Johnson joined the Labor Party in 1944 and was elected to the Western Australian Legislative Assembly as the member for Leederville in 1952. He served until his defeat in 1959.
