= Electoral district of Mount Hawthorn =

Former electoral district in Perth, Western Australia

Mount Hawthorn Western Australia—Legislative Assembly
- State: Western Australia
- Dates current: 1930–1983
- Namesake: Mount Hawthorn

The Electoral district of Mount Hawthorn was a Legislative Assembly electorate in the state of Western Australia. The district was named for the inner northern Perth suburb of Mount Hawthorn, which fell within its borders.

Mount Hawthorn was a new seat created under the Redistribution of Seats Act 1929, which took effect at the 1930 election. The Labor member for Leederville and Collier Government minister, Harry Millington ran for and won the seat, holding it until his retirement from politics at the 1947 election, in which Labor lost government after 14 years in office. Les Nimmo of the Liberal Party narrowly won the seat, but with a redistribution prior to the 1950 election reducing the likelihood of a repeat, Nimmo opted to contest the new seat of Wembley Beaches. The redistribution had also merged the North-West Labor-held seats of Pilbara and Roebourne, so Pilbara MLA Bill Hegney contested and won Mount Hawthorn, which he held until his retirement in 1968. Ron Bertram then held the seat until its abolishment at the 1983 election. The redistribution which effected the end of the seat split its voters between the seat of Subiaco, Balcatta (which Bertram contested and won) and Perth.

== Members for Mount Hawthorn ==
Member	Party	Term
Harry Millington	Labor	1930–1947
Les Nimmo	Liberal	1947–1949
Les Nimmo	Liberal Country League	1949–1950
Bill Hegney	Labor	1950–1968
Ron Bertram	Labor	1968–1983

== See also ==
- Mount Hawthorn, Western Australia
