= Iven Manning =

Australian politician

Member of the Legislative Assembly of Western Australia
- In office 25 March 1950 – 31 March 1962
- Preceded by: None (new seat)
- Succeeded by: None (seat abolished)
- Constituency: Harvey
- In office 31 March 1962 – 30 March 1974
- Preceded by: None (new seat)
- Succeeded by: June Craig
- Constituency: Wellington

Personal details
- Born: 7 June 1918 Bunbury, Western Australia, Australia
- Died: 20 July 1988 (aged 70) Perth, Western Australia, Australia
- Party: Liberal

Iven Wemyss Manning (7 June 1918 – 20 July 1988) was an Australian politician who was a Liberal Party member of the Legislative Assembly of Western Australia from 1950 to 1974.

Manning was born in Bunbury, Western Australia, to Laura Mabel (née Fidler) and Ernest Joseph Manning. He worked as a farmhand after leaving school, and then in 1940 enlisted in the Australian Imperial Force. Manning served with the 2/28th Battalion in the Middle East, and lost his arm in the First Battle of El Alamein in July 1942, in the area known as Ruin Ridge. Upon returning to Australia, he farmed at Harvey and Yarloop, and was also an officeholder with the Returned Services League (RSL) and various other veterans' organisations.

A member of the Liberal Party since 1946, Manning entered parliament at the 1950 state election, winning election to the new seat of Harvey. He switched to the recreated seat of Wellington at the 1962 election, which he held until his retirement at the 1974 election, and of the eight elections he contested was elected unopposed on four occasions. Manning was a Liberal Party whip from 1957 to 1962 and again from 1965 to 1974, and served as chairman of committees in the Legislative Assembly from 1962 to 1965. He returned to farming after leaving politics, and died in Perth in July 1988, aged 70. He had married twice, having four children with his first wife and four step children with his second.

Parliament of Western Australia
New seat	Member for Harvey; 1950–1962	Abolished
New seat	Member for Wellington; 1962–1974	Succeeded by June Craig
