= Electoral district of Wembley Beaches =

Former electoral district in Perth, Western Australia

Wembley Beaches Western Australia—Legislative Assembly
- State: Western Australia
- Dates current: 1950–1962
- Namesake: Wembley

The Electoral district of Wembley Beaches was a Legislative Assembly electorate in the state of Western Australia. The district was named for the inner western Perth suburb of Wembley, which fell within its borders.

Wembley Beaches came into existence at the 1950 election, and was largely created from the northern and coastal sections of the Leederville, which had grown considerably in population in the years immediately following World War II. The seat included the inner suburbs of Floreat Park, Jolimont and Wembley, and areas further north including Doubleview, Gwelup, Innaloo, North Beach, Scarborough, Trigg and Watermans Bay. While reasonably safe for the Liberal Country League, Wembley Beaches was won for a term by the Labor, who were relatively strong in the Scarborough and Innaloo region throughout the seat's existence.

The seat was abolished ahead of the 1962 election, with its area being split between the seats of Wembley and Karrinyup. Les Nimmo, the sitting member, contested and won the latter.

== Members for Wembley Beaches ==
Member	Party	Term
Les Nimmo	Liberal Country League	1950–1956
Frederick Marshall	Labor	1956–1959
Les Nimmo	Liberal Country League	1959–1962

== See also ==
- Wembley, Western Australia
- Electoral district of Wembley
