= Stan Lapham =

Australian politician

Stanley Edward Lapham (born 21 April 1908 in Kalgoorlie – died 14 December 1987) was a Labor politician from Western Australia. He held the seat of North Perth in the Western Australian Legislative Assembly from 14 February 1953, losing it to Liberal Ray O'Connor in 1959. He unsuccessfully contested the seat of Karrinyup in 1962 and 1965. He finally won in 1968 and held it until 1974.

In 1953 he was awarded the Queen's Coronation Medal.

In 1957 Lapham joined with Bill Grayden, Pastor Doug Nicholls and others in an expedition to the Warburton Ranges in central Australia to highlight the poor health of Australian Aborigines. The party produced a film which showed malnourished people in the region.
