= 1959 Western Australian state election =

- 21 March 1959

All 50 seats in the Western Australian Legislative Assembly 26 Assembly seats were needed for a majority
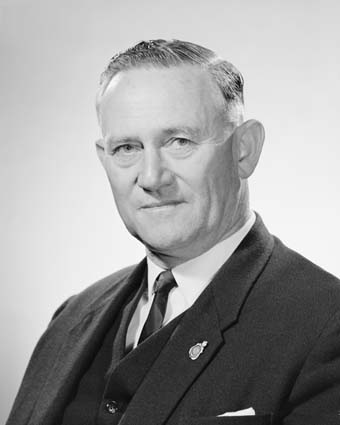

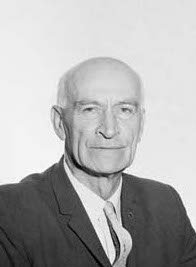
	First party	Second party
Leader	David Brand	Albert Hawke
Party	Liberal/Country coalition	Labor
Leader since	1 March 1957	3 July 1951
Leader's seat	Greenough	Northam
Last election	19 seats	29 seats
Seats won	25 seats	23 seats
Seat change	▲6	▼6
Percentage	44.03%	44.92%
Swing	▲5.65	▼4.78
Premier before election
Albert Hawke
Labor
Resulting Premier
David Brand
Liberal/Country coalition

Elections were held in the state of Western Australia on 21 March 1959 to elect all 50 members to the Legislative Assembly. The result was a hung parliament—the two-term Labor government, led by Premier Albert Hawke, was defeated with an average swing against it of about 7 per cent, but the Liberal-Country Party coalition, led by Opposition Leader David Brand, won exactly half of the seats, and needed the support of at least one of the two Independent Liberal members to obtain a majority in the Assembly. The situation remained precarious throughout the term—while Bill Grayden joined the LCL the following year, giving the Coalition a one-seat majority, the other Independent Liberal, Edward Oldfield, joined the Labor Party.

== Results ==
Western Australian state election, 21 March 1959 Legislative Assembly << 1956–1962 >>
Enrolled voters	292,596^{[1]}				
Votes cast	269,322		Turnout	92.05%	–0.13%
Informal votes	6,937		Informal	2.58%	–0.26%
Summary of votes by party
Party	Primary votes	%	Swing	Seats	Change
Labor	117,861	44.92%	–4.78%	23	– 6
Liberal and Country	98,335	37.48%	+4.34%	17	+ 6
Country	17,179	6.55%	+1.31%	8	± 0
Democratic Labor	13,436	5.12%	+5.12%	0	± 0
Ind. Lib.	10,008	3.81%	–2.92%	2	± 0
Communist	2,216	0.84%	+0.35%	0	± 0
Independent	3,350	1.28%	–3.42%	0	± 0
Total	262,385			50	

^{1} 362,629 electors were enrolled to vote at the election, but 11 seats (22% of the total) were uncontested—2 Labor seats (three less than 1956) representing 16,115 enrolled voters, 5 LCL seats (the same as 1956) representing 33,484 enrolled voters, and 4 Country seats (two less than 1956) representing 20,434 enrolled voters.

== See also ==
- Members of the Western Australian Legislative Assembly, 1956–1959
- Members of the Western Australian Legislative Assembly, 1959–1962
- Candidates of the 1959 Western Australian state election
