= 1956 Western Australian state election =

- 7 April 1956

All 50 seats in the Western Australian Legislative Assembly 26 Assembly seats were needed for a majority
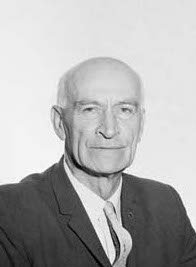

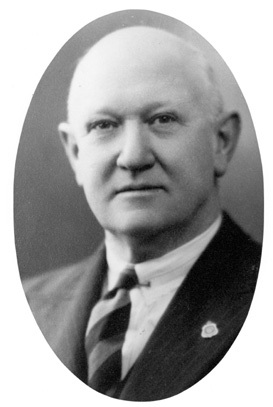
	First party	Second party
Leader	Albert Hawke	Ross McLarty
Party	Labor	Liberal/Country coalition
Leader since	3 July 1951	14 December 1946
Leader's seat	Northam	Murray-Wellington
Last election	26 seats	24 seats
Seats won	29 seats	19 seats
Seat change	▲3	▼5
Percentage	49.70%	38.37%
Swing	▼0.07	▼4.49
Premier before election
Albert Hawke
Labor
Elected Premier
Albert Hawke
Labor

Elections were held in the state of Western Australia on 7 April 1956 to elect all 50 members to the Legislative Assembly. The Labor Party, led by Premier Albert Hawke, won a second term in office against the Liberal-Country coalition, led by Sir Ross McLarty.

== Key dates ==
Date	Event
21 February 1956	Writs were issued by the Governor to proceed with an election.
29 February 1956	Close of nominations.
7 April 1956	Polling day, between the hours of 8am and 6pm.
20 April 1956	The Hawke Ministry was reconstituted.
23 April 1956	The writ was returned and the results formally declared.

== Results ==
Western Australian state election, 7 April 1956 Legislative Assembly << 1953–1959 >>
Enrolled voters	262,384^{[1]}				
Votes cast	241,863		Turnout	92.18	–1.30
Informal votes	6,851		Informal	2.83	+0.22
Summary of votes by party
Party	Primary votes	%	Swing	Seats	Change
Labor	116,793	49.70	–0.07	29	+ 3
Liberal and Country	98,335	33.13	–4.82	11	– 4
Country	12,319	5.24	+0.33	8	– 1
Ind. Lib.	15,822	6.73	+4.89	2	+ 2
Communist	1,167	0.50	–0.22	0	± 0
Independent	11,045	4.70	–0.10	0	± 0
Total	241,863			50	

^{1} 342,018 electors were enrolled to vote at the election, but 16 seats (32% of the total) were uncontested—5 Labor seats (seven less than 1953) representing 24,951 enrolled voters, 5 Liberal seats (two more than 1953) representing 24,834 enrolled voters, and 6 Country seats (one less than 1953) representing 29,839 enrolled voters.

== See also ==
- Members of the Western Australian Legislative Assembly, 1953–1956
- Members of the Western Australian Legislative Assembly, 1956–1959
- Candidates of the 1956 Western Australian state election
