= Electoral results for the district of Bunbury =

Western Australian district election results

This is a list of electoral results for the electoral district of Bunbury in Western Australian state elections.

== Members for Bunbury ==
Member	Party	Term
John Forrest	Ministerial	1890–1901
Thomas Hayward	Ministerial	1901–1904
Newton Moore	Ministerial	1904–1911
William Thomas	Labor	1911–1917
William Thomas	National Labor	1917
Griffin Money	Nationalist	1917–1924
Frederick Withers	Labor	1924–1947
James Murray	Liberal	1947–1950
Frank Guthrie	Labor	1950–1955
George Roberts	Liberal	1955–1962
Maurice Williams	Liberal	1962–1973
John Sibson	Liberal	1973–1983
Phil Smith	Labor	1983–1993
Ian Osborne	Liberal	1993–2001
Tony Dean	Labor	2001–2005
John Castrilli	Liberal	2005–2017
Don Punch	Labor	2017–present

== Election results ==
=== Elections in the 2020s ===
2025 Western Australian state election: Bunbury
Party	Candidate	Votes	%	±%
Labor	Don Punch	10,669	40.9	−19.6
Liberal	Heather Reid	7,223	27.7	+8.8
Greens	Patricia Perks	2,530	9.7	+4.9
Legalise Cannabis	John Bell	1,631	6.2	+3.9
One Nation	Shane Myles	1,556	6.0	+3.3
National	Codee-Lee Down	1,425	5.5	+1.0
Christians	Boyd Davey	721	2.8	+2.8
Shooters, Fishers, Farmers	Cameron Van Veen	351	1.3	−1.2
Total formal votes		26,106	94.8	−0.6
Informal votes		1,425	5.2	+0.6
Turnout		27,531	83.8	+3.4
Two-party-preferred result
Labor	Don Punch	14,901	57.1	−15.4
Liberal	Heather Reid	11,178	42.9	+15.4
Labor hold		Swing	−15.4	

Results are not final. Last updated on 26 March 2025 at 1:30 PM AWST

2021 Western Australian state election: Bunbury
Party	Candidate	Votes	%	±%
Labor	Don Punch	14,791	60.5	+16.9
Liberal	Matt Foreman	4,604	18.8	−3.6
Greens	Patricia Perks	1,170	4.8	−2.0
National	Codee-Lee Down	1,081	4.4	−9.4
One Nation	Gail Jones	656	2.7	−6.2
Shooters, Fishers, Farmers	Shane Hastie	615	2.5	−1.0
Legalise Cannabis	Kelly Hibbert	582	2.4	+2.4
Western Australia	Kieran Noonan	415	1.7	+1.7
No Mandatory Vaccination	Anthony Merrifield	348	1.4	+1.4
Sustainable Australia	James Minson	158	0.6	+0.6
WAxit	Dan Acatinca	43	0.2	−0.1
Total formal votes		24,463	95.5	+0.2
Informal votes		1,163	4.5	−0.2
Turnout		25,626	84.1	−2.0
Two-party-preferred result
Labor	Don Punch	17,730	72.5	+12.0
Liberal	Matt Foreman	6,719	27.5	−12.0
Labor hold		Swing	+12.0	

=== Elections in the 2010s ===
2017 Western Australian state election: Bunbury
Party	Candidate	Votes	%	±%
Labor	Don Punch	10,099	43.9	+14.4
Liberal	Ian Morison	5,118	22.2	−30.0
National	James Hayward	3,162	13.7	+6.4
One Nation	Samuel Brown	2,050	8.9	+8.9
Greens	Michael Baldock	1,559	6.8	+0.4
Shooters, Fishers, Farmers	Bernie Masters	804	3.5	+3.5
Flux the System!	Anthony Shannon	172	0.7	+0.7
Micro Business	Aldo Del Popolo	65	0.3	+0.3
Total formal votes		23,029	95.2	+1.3
Informal votes		1,150	4.8	−1.3
Turnout		24,179	86.5	+0.9
Two-party-preferred result
Labor	Don Punch	14,003	60.8	+23.0
Liberal	Ian Morison	9,010	39.2	−23.0
Labor gain from Liberal		Swing	+23.0	

2013 Western Australian state election: Bunbury
Party	Candidate	Votes	%	±%
Liberal	John Castrilli	10,375	52.7	+0.7
Labor	Karen Steele	5,595	28.4	–1.2
National	James Forsyth	1,562	7.9	+6.8
Greens	Mitchella Hutchins	1,250	6.4	–2.6
Family First	Linda Rose	374	1.9	–4.0
Independent	Lua Alfa Conedoli	285	1.4	+1.4
Christians	Edward Dabrowski	243	1.2	–0.9
Total formal votes		19,684	93.7	−1.5
Informal votes		1,320	6.3	+1.5
Turnout		21,004	89.2	
Two-party-preferred result
Liberal	John Castrilli	12,420	63.1	+2.0
Labor	Karen Steele	7,255	36.9	–2.0
Liberal hold		Swing	+2.0	

=== Elections in the 2000s ===
2008 Western Australian state election: Bunbury
Party	Candidate	Votes	%	±%
Liberal	John Castrilli	9,400	53.58	+12.2
Labor	Peter MacFarlane	5,192	29.60	−12.7
Greens	Peter Eckersley	1,591	9.07	+3.0
Family First	Mandy Roberts	1,009	5.75	+1.9
Christian Democrats	Edward Dabrowski	351	2.00	+0.7
Total formal votes		17,543	95.35	
Informal votes		856	4.65	
Turnout		18,399	83.87	
Two-party-preferred result
Liberal	John Castrilli	10,825	61.73	+12.6
Labor	Peter MacFarlane	6,711	38.27	−12.6
Liberal gain from Labor		Swing	+12.6	

2005 Western Australian state election: Bunbury
Party	Candidate	Votes	%	±%
Liberal	John Castrilli	5,478	43.1	+4.4
Labor	Tony Dean	5,344	42.0	+7.8
Greens	Joshua Ledger	746	5.9	−0.5
Family First	Mandy Roberts	426	3.3	+3.3
One Nation	Brian McRae	300	2.4	−7.9
Independent	Jodie Murray	188	1.5	+1.5
Christian Democrats	Shane Flanegan	139	1.1	+1.1
Independent	Chris Cox	102	0.8	+0.8
Total formal votes		12,723	95.2	−0.3
Informal votes		646	4.8	+0.3
Turnout		13,369	90.9	
Two-party-preferred result
Liberal	John Castrilli	6,397	50.4	+0.6
Labor	Tony Dean	6,294	49.6	−0.6
Liberal gain from Labor		Swing	+0.6	

2001 Western Australian state election: Bunbury
Party	Candidate	Votes	%	±%
Liberal	Ian Osborne	4,260	36.2	−11.5
Labor	Tony Dean	4,092	34.7	+1.2
One Nation	Alan Giorgi	1,233	10.5	+10.5
Independent	Brendan Kelly	1,128	9.6	+9.6
Greens	Marilyn Palmer	749	6.4	+1.2
Democrats	Ron Hellyer	149	1.3	−1.0
Independent	Alfred Bussell	68	0.6	+0.6
Independent	Geoffrey	52	0.4	+0.4
Independent	Mary Lupi	48	0.4	+0.4
Total formal votes		11,779	95.6	−0.4
Informal votes		548	4.4	+0.4
Turnout		12,327	90.7	
Two-party-preferred result
Labor	Tony Dean	6,020	51.5	+6.8
Liberal	Ian Osborne	5,674	48.5	−6.8
Labor gain from Liberal		Swing	+6.8	

=== Elections in the 1990s ===
1996 Western Australian state election: Bunbury
Party	Candidate	Votes	%	±%
Liberal	Ian Osborne	5,322	47.7	+2.1
Labor	Barry Down	3,740	33.5	−9.9
Independent	Mary Collins	1,069	9.6	+9.6
Greens	Joan Jenkins	585	5.2	−1.3
Democrats	Ronald Hellyer	256	2.3	+2.1
Independent	Joanne Hill	195	1.7	+1.7
Total formal votes		11,167	96.0	−0.6
Informal votes		467	4.0	+0.6
Turnout		11,634	91.1	
Two-party-preferred result
Liberal	Ian Osborne	6,166	55.3	+5.0
Labor	Barry Down	4,993	44.7	−5.0
Liberal hold		Swing	+5.0	

1993 Western Australian state election: Bunbury
Party	Candidate	Votes	%	±%
Liberal	Ian Osborne	4,659	47.3	+4.3
Labor	Phil Smith	4,190	42.5	−5.2
Greens	Marilyn Palmer	671	6.8	+6.8
Independent	Ronald Waldron	333	3.4	+3.4
Total formal votes		9,853	96.8	+2.5
Informal votes		328	3.2	−2.5
Turnout		10,181	95.2	+3.7
Two-party-preferred result
Liberal	Ian Osborne	5,084	51.6	+3.1
Labor	Phil Smith	4,769	48.4	−3.1
Liberal gain from Labor		Swing	+3.1	

=== Elections in the 1980s ===
1989 Western Australian state election: Bunbury
Party	Candidate	Votes	%	±%
Labor	Phil Smith	4,402	47.7	−6.9
Liberal	Raymond Bosustow	3,969	43.0	−0.9
Grey Power	Margaret Charnley	402	4.4	+4.4
Independent	Judyth Salom	349	3.8	+3.8
Citizens Electoral Council	David Morrissey	113	1.2	+1.2
Total formal votes		9,235	94.3	
Informal votes		554	5.7	
Turnout		9,789	91.5	
Two-party-preferred result
Labor	Phil Smith	4,759	51.5	−3.9
Liberal	Raymond Bosustow	4,476	48.5	+3.9
Labor hold		Swing	−3.9	

1986 Western Australian state election: Bunbury
Party	Candidate	Votes	%	±%
Labor	Phil Smith	4,531	54.6	+3.4
Liberal	John Sibson	3,644	43.9	−1.9
Independent	Alfred Bussell	131	1.6	+1.6
Total formal votes		8,306	97.8	+0.6
Informal votes		186	2.2	−0.6
Turnout		8,492	92.3	+1.4
Two-party-preferred result
Labor	Phil Smith	4,601	55.4	+2.7
Liberal	John Sibson	3,705	44.6	−2.7
Labor hold		Swing	+2.7	

1983 Western Australian state election: Bunbury
Party	Candidate	Votes	%	±%
Labor	Phil Smith	4,011	51.2	
Liberal	John Sibson	3,588	45.7	
Democrats	Donald Stewart	243	3.1	
Total formal votes		7,842	97.2	
Informal votes		227	2.8	
Turnout		8,069	90.9	
Two-party-preferred result
Labor	Phil Smith	4,133	52.7	
Liberal	John Sibson	3,709	47.3	
Labor gain from Liberal		Swing		

1980 Western Australian state election: Bunbury
Party	Candidate	Votes	%	±%
Liberal	John Sibson	4,087	48.7	−5.8
Labor	Phil Smith	3,813	45.5	0.0
Democrats	Donald Stewart	483	5.8	+5.8
Total formal votes		8,383	97.5	−0.9
Informal votes		217	2.5	+0.9
Turnout		8,600	90.8	−1.9
Two-party-preferred result
Liberal	John Sibson	4,304	51.3	−3.2
Labor	Phil Smith	4,079	48.7	+3.2
Liberal hold		Swing	−3.2	

=== Elections in the 1970s ===
1977 Western Australian state election: Bunbury
Party	Candidate	Votes	%	±%
Liberal	John Sibson	4,357	54.5	
Labor	David Smith	3,643	45.5	
Total formal votes		8,000	98.4	
Informal votes		131	1.6	
Turnout		8,131	92.7	
Liberal hold		Swing		

1974 Western Australian state election: Bunbury
Party	Candidate	Votes	%	±%
Liberal	John Sibson	3,705	50.3	
Labor	Robert Wells	3,657	49.7	
Total formal votes		7,362	97.7	
Informal votes		174	2.3	
Turnout		7,536	94.9	
Liberal hold		Swing		

1973 Bunbury state by-election
Party	Candidate	Votes	%	±%
Liberal	John Sibson	3,479	51.0	+7.6
Labor	Frank Kirwan	3,337	49.0	+3.1
Total formal votes		6,816	99.3	+2.4
Informal votes		46	0.7	−2.4
Turnout		6,862	87.8	−6.1
Liberal hold		Swing	−0.2	

1971 Western Australian state election: Bunbury
Party	Candidate	Votes	%	±%
Labor	Robert Wells	3,096	45.9	+2.1
Liberal	Maurice Williams	2,932	43.4	−9.2
Democratic Labor	Michael Buswell	451	6.7	+3.1
Independent	Charles Turner	272	4.0	+4.0
Total formal votes		6,751	96.9	−1.6
Informal votes		217	3.1	+1.6
Turnout		6,968	93.9	+0.2
Two-party-preferred result
Liberal	Maurice Williams	3,458	51.2	−4.5
Labor	Robert Wells	3,293	48.8	+4.5
Liberal hold		Swing	−4.5	

=== Elections in the 1960s ===
1968 Western Australian state election: Bunbury
Party	Candidate	Votes	%	±%
Liberal and Country	Maurice Williams	3,107	52.6	
Labor	Alexandra White	2,584	43.8	
Democratic Labor	John Guidera	213	3.6	
Total formal votes		5,904	98.5	
Informal votes		88	1.5	
Turnout		5,992	93.7	
Two-party-preferred result
Liberal and Country	Maurice Williams	3,305	55.7	
Labor	Alexandra White	2,599	44.3	
Liberal and Country hold		Swing		

1965 Western Australian state election: Bunbury
Party	Candidate	Votes	%	±%
Liberal and Country	Maurice Williams	3,033	52.4	−1.3
Labor	Edward Cooke	2,755	47.6	+1.3
Total formal votes		5,788	98.8	−0.7
Informal votes		71	1.2	+0.7
Turnout		5,859	94.7	+0.6
Liberal and Country hold		Swing	−1.3	

1962 Bunbury state by-election
Party	Candidate	Votes	%	±%
Liberal and Country	Maurice Williams	2,572	48.2	−5.5
Labor	Charles Webber	2,483	46.5	+0.2
Democratic Labor	Gilbert Handcock	280	5.3	+5.3
Total formal votes		5,335	99.3	−0.2
Informal votes		37	0.7	+0.2
Turnout		5,372	93.3	−0.8
Two-party-preferred result
Liberal and Country	Maurice Williams	2,787	52.2	−1.5
Labor	Charles Webber	2,548	47.8	+1.5
Liberal and Country hold		Swing	−1.5	

1962 Western Australian state election: Bunbury
Party	Candidate	Votes	%	±%
Liberal and Country	George Roberts	2,936	53.7	
Labor	Charles Webber	2,535	46.3	
Total formal votes		5,471	99.5	
Informal votes		25	0.5	
Turnout		5,496	94.1	
Liberal and Country hold		Swing		

=== Elections in the 1950s ===
1959 Western Australian state election: Bunbury
Party	Candidate	Votes	%	±%
Liberal and Country	George Roberts	3,337	54.0	+3.1
Labor	Forrest Hay	2,847	46.0	−3.1
Total formal votes		6,184	99.0	−0.1
Informal votes		64	1.0	+0.1
Turnout		6,248	95.7	−1.4
Liberal and Country hold		Swing	+3.1	

1956 Western Australian state election: Bunbury
Party	Candidate	Votes	%	±%
Liberal and Country	George Roberts	2,754	50.9	
Labor	Charles Webber	2,655	49.1	
Total formal votes		5,409	99.1	
Informal votes		49	0.9	
Turnout		5,458	97.1	
Liberal and Country gain from Labor		Swing		

1955 Bunbury state by-election
Party	Candidate	Votes	%	±%
Liberal and Country	George Roberts	2,764	51.3	+51.3
Labor	Charles Webber	2,592	48.1	N/A
Independent Liberal	James Collins	33	0.6	+0.6
Total formal votes		5,389	99.3	
Informal votes		37	0.7	
Turnout		5,426	93.6	
Liberal and Country gain from Labor		Swing	N/A	

1953 Western Australian state election: Bunbury
Party	Candidate	Votes	%	±%
Labor	Frank Guthrie	unopposed		
Labor hold		Swing		

1950 Western Australian state election: Bunbury
Party	Candidate	Votes	%	±%
Labor	Frank Guthrie	2,186	49.0	
Liberal and Country	James Murray	1,632	36.6	
Country	Percy Payne	645	14.4	
Total formal votes		4,463	99.1	
Informal votes		41	0.9	
Turnout		4,504	94.6	
Two-party-preferred result
Labor	Frank Guthrie	2,340	52.4	
Liberal and Country	James Murray	2,123	47.6	
Labor gain from Liberal and Country		Swing		

=== Elections in the 1940s ===
1947 Western Australian state election: Bunbury
Party	Candidate	Votes	%	±%
Labor	John Kirke	2,370	45.4	−10.1
Liberal	James Murray	1,517	29.0	+29.0
Country	Albert Scott	1,338	25.6	−18.9
Total formal votes		5,225	98.7	+0.5
Informal votes		69	1.3	−0.5
Turnout		5,294	90.9	+5.1
Two-party-preferred result
Liberal	James Murray	2,658	50.9	+6.4
Labor	John Kirke	2,567	49.1	−6.4
Liberal gain from Labor		Swing	+6.4	

1943 Western Australian state election: Bunbury
Party	Candidate	Votes	%	±%
Labor	Frederick Withers	2,565	55.5	+1.6
Country	Jasper Norton	2,060	44.5	+18.3
Total formal votes		4,625	98.2	−0.2
Informal votes		86	1.8	+0.2
Turnout		4,711	85.8	−8.4
Labor hold		Swing	N/A	

=== Elections in the 1930s ===
1939 Western Australian state election: Bunbury
Party	Candidate	Votes	%	±%
Labor	Frederick Withers	2,637	53.9	−6.3
Country	Jasper Norton	1,279	26.2	+26.2
Nationalist	Vincent Donaldson	973	19.9	−19.9
Total formal votes		4,889	98.4	−0.5
Informal votes		79	1.6	+0.5
Turnout		4,968	94.2	+22.4
Labor hold		Swing	N/A	

1936 Western Australian state election: Bunbury
Party	Candidate	Votes	%	±%
Labor	Frederick Withers	2,136	60.2	+4.8
Nationalist	Cuthbert Butler	1,410	39.8	−4.8
Total formal votes		3,546	98.9	−0.1
Informal votes		38	1.1	+0.1
Turnout		3,584	71.8	−23.7
Labor hold		Swing	+4.8	

1933 Western Australian state election: Bunbury
Party	Candidate	Votes	%	±%
Labor	Frederick Withers	2,422	55.4	+0.2
Nationalist	John Hands	1,954	44.6	−0.2
Total formal votes		4,376	99.0	+0.2
Informal votes		45	1.0	−0.2
Turnout		4,421	95.5	+8.2
Labor hold		Swing	+0.2	

1930 Western Australian state election: Bunbury
Party	Candidate	Votes	%	±%
Labor	Frederick Withers	1,950	55.2	
Nationalist	John Hands	1,581	44.8	
Total formal votes		3,531	99.2	
Informal votes		28	0.8	
Turnout		3,559	87.3	
Labor hold		Swing		

=== Elections in the 1920s ===
1927 Western Australian state election: Bunbury
Party	Candidate	Votes	%	±%
Labor	Frederick Withers	1,916	59.8	+13.0
Nationalist	Les Craig	674	21.0	−17.2
Nationalist	George Clarke	616	19.2	+19.2
Total formal votes		3,206	99.1	+0.7
Informal votes		30	0.9	−0.7
Turnout		3,236	87.6	+13.4
Labor hold		Swing	N/A	

- Preferences were not distributed.

1924 Western Australian state election: Bunbury
Party	Candidate	Votes	%	±%
Labor	Frederick Withers	1,251	46.8	−2.4
Nationalist	Griffin Money	1,021	38.2	−12.6
Ind. Nationalist	Hannah Thomas	399	14.9	+14.9
Total formal votes		2,671	98.4	−1.1
Informal votes		44	1.6	+1.1
Turnout		2,715	74.2	+6.0
Two-party-preferred result
Labor	Frederick Withers	1,346	50.4	+1.2
Nationalist	Griffin Money	1,325	49.6	−1.2
Labor gain from Nationalist		Swing	+1.2	

1921 Western Australian state election: Bunbury
Party	Candidate	Votes	%	±%
Nationalist	Griffin Money	1,143	50.8	+17.4
Labor	Frederick Withers	1,108	49.2	+23.0
Total formal votes		2,251	99.5	+1.2
Informal votes		12	0.5	−1.2
Turnout		2,263	68.2	−8.1
Nationalist hold		Swing	N/A	

=== Elections in the 1910s ===
1917 Western Australian state election: Bunbury
Party	Candidate	Votes	%	±%
National Labor	William Thomas	898	40.4	+40.4
Nationalist	Griffin Money	742	33.4	+33.4
Labor	Philip McKenna	583	26.2	–25.0
Total formal votes		2,223	98.3	–1.1
Informal votes		39	1.7	+1.1
Turnout		2,262	76.3	+8.3
Two-party-preferred result
Nationalist	Griffin Money	1,222	55.0	+55.0
National Labor	William Thomas	1,001	45.0	+45.0
Nationalist gain from National Labor		Swing	+0.7	

1914 Western Australian state election: Bunbury
Party	Candidate	Votes	%	±%
Labor	William Thomas	1,397	51.6	−3.3
Liberal	Griffin Money	1,309	48.4	+3.3
Total formal votes		2,706	99.4	−0.3
Informal votes		16	0.6	+0.3
Turnout		2,722	68.0	−24.0
Labor hold		Swing	−3.3	

1911 Western Australian state election: Bunbury
Party	Candidate	Votes	%	±%
Labor	William Thomas	1,420	54.9	
Ministerialist	John Ewing	1,169	45.1	
Total formal votes		2,589	99.7	
Informal votes		8	0.3	
Turnout		2,597	92.0	
Labor gain from Ministerialist		Swing	N/A	

1911 Bunbury state by-election
Party	Candidate	Votes	%	±%
Labor	William Thomas	931	55.3	+55.3
Ministerialist	Edgar Zollner	752	44.7	N/A
Total formal votes		1,683	99.4	
Informal votes		10	0.6	
Turnout		1,693	88.3	
Labor gain from Ministerialist		Swing	N/A	

=== Elections in the 1900s ===
1908 Western Australian state election: Bunbury
Party	Candidate	Votes	%	±%
Ministerialist	Newton Moore	unopposed		
Ministerialist hold		Swing		

1905 Western Australian state election: Bunbury
Party	Candidate	Votes	%	±%
Ministerialist	Newton Moore	unopposed		
Ministerialist hold		Swing		

1905 Bunbury state by-election
Party	Candidate	Votes	%	±%
Ministerialist	Newton Moore	889	72.2	+6.8
Labour	Thomas Griffiths	343	27.8	−6.8
Total formal votes		1,232	98.5	−0.8
Informal votes		19	1.5	+0.8
Turnout		1,251	49.2	−11.6
Ministerialist hold		Swing	+6.8	

1904 Western Australian state election: Bunbury
Party	Candidate	Votes	%	±%
Ministerialist	Newton Moore	1,088	65.4	+20.1
Labour	Thomas Griffiths	576	34.6	+34.6
Total formal votes		1,664	99.3	+0.8
Informal votes		11	0.7	–0.8
Turnout		1,675	60.8	–2.7
Ministerialist hold		Swing	N/A	

1901 Western Australian state election: Bunbury
Party	Candidate	Votes	%	±%
Ministerialist	Thomas Hayward	459	50.9	+50.9
Ministerialist	Newton Moore	409	45.3	+45.3
Opposition	James Port	34	3.8	+3.8
Total formal votes		902	98.5	n/a
Informal votes		14	1.5	n/a
Turnout		916	63.5	n/a
Ministerialist hold		Swing	N/A	

=== Elections in the 1890s ===
1897 Western Australian colonial election: Bunbury
Party	Candidate	Votes	%	±%
Ministerialist	John Forrest	unopposed		
Ministerialist hold		Swing		

1894 Western Australian colonial election: Bunbury
Party	Candidate	Votes	%	±%
None	Sir John Forrest	unopposed		

1890 Western Australian colonial election: Bunbury
Party	Candidate	Votes	%	±%
None	John Forrest	unopposed		
