= 1998 Queen's Birthday Honours (Australia) =

The 1998 Queen's Birthday Honours for Australia were announced on Monday 8 June 1998 by the office of the Governor-General.

The Birthday Honours were appointments by some of the 16 Commonwealth realms of Queen Elizabeth II to various orders and honours to reward and highlight good works by citizens of those countries. The Birthday Honours are awarded as part of the Queen's Official Birthday celebrations during the month of June.

== Order of Australia ==
=== Companion (AC) ===
==== General Division ====
Recipient	Citation	Notes
Professor Antony Wilks Burgess	For service to scientific research and clinical medicine, particularly through research into the early diagnosis and treatment of cancer, and for developing structures to link diverse research units to facilitate the exchange of information and protocols.	

=== Officer (AO) ===
==== General Division ====
Recipient	Citation	Notes
Professor Donald Alexander Aitkin	For service to higher education and to the community as a scholar, writer, teacher, mentor, and leader in the Australian universities sector.	
Anonymous	For service to international affairs and to the promotion and protection of human rights.	
Professor Ronald Newbold Bracewell	For service to science in the fields of radio astronomy and image reconstruction.	
The Most Reverend Dr Peter Frederick Carnley	For service to the Anglican Church of Australia and to the community through his contributions to theology, the nurturing of ecumenicalism between the churches and their faiths, and in the cause of social justice.	
Professor Yvonne Edna Cossart	For service to medicine as a specialist in infectious diseases, especially in the areas of virological research, epidemiology and disease prevention, and to education.	
Patricia Ann Crook	For service to the small business sector and to trade development.	
Dawn Fraser MBE	In recognition of service to the community, particularly as a sports consultant and administrator, and through organisations for people with disabilities and to the environment.	
Robert Alan Grice	For service to the accountancy profession, to education, and to the community, particularly through the Scripture Union of Australia and Project Australia.	
Associate Professor Susan Carol Hayes	For service to the community, particularly through research on criminality in the young and the problems faced by people with developmental disabilities in the criminal justice system.	
Dr Geoffrey Sinclair Heithersay	For service to dentistry, particularly in the field of endodontics, and for his contribution to the inauguration and development of post-graduate endodontic training in Australia.	
Dr Judy Isabel Henderson	For service to developing countries, particularly as chairman of Community Aid Abroad and Oxfam International, and to the community through the promotion of environmental issues.	
Emeritus Professor Mollie Elizabeth Holman	For service to scientific research, particularly relating to the autonomic nervous system and the control of smooth muscle, and to education and university administration.	
Dr Ernest Cosmo Manea AM	For service to the community of Bunbury, to local government, to regional planning and development, and to the advancement of the harness racing industry.	
Graeme Julian Samuel	For service to the community in a broad range of roles within arts, business, education, health, sport and community organisations.	
Joseph Saragossi	For service to the glass and aluminium industry, and to the Jewish community.	
Rex Kenneth Stevenson	For service to international relations.	
The late Anthony James Sweeney	For service to the community through the Sir David Martin Foundation and the St George Foundation, and to the finance sector through the St George Bank.	
Professor David John Tiller	For service to medicine, to medical education and to medical research, particularly in the field of kidney disease and hypertension.	

==== Military Division ====
Branch	Recipient	Citation	Notes
Navy	Vice Admiral Christopher Alexander Barrie, AM, RAN	For distinguished service to the Australian Defence Force as Deputy Chief of Naval Staff and Vice Chief of the Defence Force.	
Army	Major General Desmond Maurice Mueller, AM	For distinguished service to the Australian Army and the Australian Defence Force in the fields of force development and logistics.	
Air Force	Air Marshal Errol John McCormack AM	For distinguished service to the Royal Australian Air Force as Commander Integrated Air Defence System, Malaysia and Deputy Chief of Air Force.	

=== Member (AM) ===
==== General Division ====
Recipient	Citation	Notes
Professor Anthony Irvine Adams	For service to the community in the field of epidemiology and to the public health, particularly through public health policy development and program delivery.	
John Alexander Andre	For service to the beef cattle industry, particularly in relation to product quality assurance, quarantine and animal health issues, and the problems of chemical residues.	
Alexander William Arbuthnot	For service to Landcare and the management of natural resources, and to the dairy industry through the United Dairy Farmers of Victoria and the Victorian Farmers Federation.	
Professor Yianni Ioannis Attikiouzel	For service to science and technology in the field of electrical and electronic engineering with particular regard to his research into the application of neural networks to industrial and medical problems, and to the Greek community of Western Australia.	
Stella Axarlis	For service to the community in the areas of training and employment opportunities, to business and to children with special needs.	
Michael Weir Barrett	For service to the community, particularly to ex-service men and women and their families, and through the Northern Territory Division of the Australian Red Cross as executive director since 1991 and the St John Ambulance Council since 1988.	
James Edward Barry MBE	For service to sport, particularly gymnastics, through the Australian Gymnastics Federation and the International Gymnastics Federation.	
Marco Belgiorno-Zegna	For service to engineering.	
Marcus Charles Blackmore	For service to business and industry, particularly through the development of the natural health products industry, and to the community.	
Elisabeth Janet Calvert-Jones	For service to children with hearing impairments, particularly as chairman of the Advisory Council for Children with Impaired Hearing, to the Murdoch Institute for Research into Birth Defects, and to the community as a benefactor and supporter of charitable organisations.	
Michael Glenn Chugg	For service to music and the performing arts, particularly in relation to the promotion of Australian artists and to fundraising for youth and children's charities.	
Dr Geoffrey Malcolm Clarke	For service to the development and advancement of the specialty of intensive care, to education, and to anaesthesiology, particularly as inaugural dean of the Faculty of Intensive Care, Australian and New Zealand College of Anaesthetists (1993–1997).	
Richard Cleaver CBE	For service to the aged in the community, in particular as the founder and chairman for more than 37 years of Swan Cottage Homes Incorporated.	
Helen Margaret Colman	For service to arts administration, particularly as general manager of the Arts Council of New South Wales.	
Lorraine Joyce Crapp	For service to sport, particularly swimming at national and international levels, and to the community through the promotion of sport and the benefits of a healthy lifestyle.	
Dr Gwenda Beed Davey	For service to the protection and preservation of Australia's traditional folklore and folklife.	
Bruce Ian Dickson	For service to sport in the administration of sailing and yachting at state and national levels.	
John Douglas Donoghue	For service to the sport of rowing at club, national and international levels and to the Australian Olympic movement.	
Dimity Ann Dornan	For service to children with hearing impairments through the establishment of the Hear and Say Centre and the Queensland Children's Cochlear Implant Program.	
Michael Bernard Easson	For service to the community through the trade union movement and for his contribution on many boards and committees across a wide range of commerce and industry.	
Dr Joseph Epstein	For service to medicine, particularly in the field of emergency medicine as a clinician, educator and administrator, and as founder of the Medical Emergency Adult Retrieval Service in Victoria.	
George William Carruthers Ewan	For service to vocational education and training through the Melbourne Institute of Textiles and to the community, particularly through Special Olympics, Victoria.	
Anne Mary Ross Fairbairn	For service to Australian literature as a poet and to international relations, particularly between Australia and the Middle East through translations of poetry and cultural exchanges.	
John Vincent Fisher	For service to people with disabilities, particularly through the Abilympics Association and the promotion of work, living and leisure skills.	
Lady Renee George	For service to the community as a fundraiser through the Arthur and Renee George Foundation, the Australian Red Cross, the Greek Orthodox Church, and the Sydney Children's Hospital.	
Prue Gillies	For service to education, in particular as principal of Ruyton Girls' School and to the community.	
Dr Eric Gross	For service to music as a composer and educator particularly through the University of Sydney and the Fellowship of Australian Composers.	
Emeritus Professor James Seymour Hagan	For service to higher education and to the study of Australia's labour and social history.	
David Anthony Harley	For service to environmental management and accountability and to support for the adoption of new technologies for environmental improvement.	
Sister Jillian Mary Havey	For service to education, in particular Catholic school education as principal of St Dominic's Priory College, North Adelaide.	
Jean Francis Hay	For service to the Manly community through local government, community action and sporting groups, and as a fundraiser for welfare and health education programmes.	
Dr Robert Anthony Neville Henry	For service to international aid through the Australian Red Cross Society and to medicine.	
Peggy Joy Lucille Holroyde	For service to the cultural development of Western Australia, particularly through the Indian Ocean Arts Association and the Indian Ocean Cultural Council.	
Professor Arnold Leighton Hunt	For service to athletics and to youth through Little Athletics.	
Professor Graham Allen Ross Johnston	For service to science in the research fields of bio organic chemistry and pharmacology, to scientific organisations, and to science policy development.	
Basil Jones	For service to music, particularly music education through the Queensland Conservatorium of Music.	
Clive Raymond (Kim) Jones	For service to the development of Australia's business relations with Japan and France, and for his contribution to peace initiatives in the disarmament field.	
Hazel Elizabeth Kenny	For service to the community in the Melville and Applecross areas, and to the Women Justices' Association of Western Australia.	
Michael John Kent	For service to the community through support for charitable organisations and sporting bodies, and to business and retail industry associations.	
Wallace Macarthur King	For service to the construction industry, to the Australian Constructors Association and to the community.	
Dr William Alexander Land, RFD	For service to medicine as a dermatologist and to the Australasian College of Dermatologists since 1966.	
Professor Roger Alexander Layton	For service to marketing, research and teaching, particularly as chair of marketing at the University of New South Wales.	
Joseph Lo Bianco	For service to the development of language policy and planning in Australia and overseas.	
Joseph Hamilton Marshall	For service to people with hearing impairments, particularly through the Deafness Foundation of Victoria.	
Dr Allan William Martin	For service in the field of Australian historiography as a teacher scholar, and biographer and as Foundation Professor of the History Department at La Trobe University.	
Michael Leslie Marx	For service to the community, particularly through representation on state and national Jewish organisations, and to youth services in the Waverley area.	
Dr John Philip Masel	For service to medicine in the field of paediatric radiology, including service as Director of Metropolitan Paediatric Radiology and as Director of Radiology, Royal Children's Hospital, Brisbane.	
Dr Michael George McCall	For service to industry and to the community, particularly through the provision and development of health care in Western Australia.	
Ian McKay Milne	For service to social welfare and international relations through the Leprosy Mission International since 1978 and the Asia Pacific Christian Mission for over thirty years.	
Eric John Milson	For service to the Australian theatre industry, both professional and amateur, in particular, as head of the Department of Musical Theatre at the Western Australian Academy of Performing Arts.	
John Edgar Minson	For service to country music and to the entertainment industry, and in particular for his contribution in establishing Tamworth as the country music capital of Australia.	
Dr William Russell Boyd Morrison	For service to engineering education, particularly the science and practice of engineering, to mechanical engineering, and to the commercialisation and export of Australian technology.	
June Nixon	For service to church music in Australia, particularly as the director of music at St Paul's Cathedral, Melbourne, and as an organist, teacher and composer.	
The late Marcia Rachael O'Keefe	For service to the community as an advocate for the improved management and treatment of breast cancer.	
Sister Patricia Geraldine Pak Poy	For service to the community particularly as national coordinator of the Australian Network of the International Campaign to Ban Landmines since its inception in 1993.	
Professor Lesley Hannah Parker	For service to education, particularly through promoting gender equality in mathematics and science education.	
Emeritus Professor Hugh Whitelaw Stuart Philp	For service to education in the areas of research, teaching and administration and as an advocate for the provision of education as a basic human right, particularly for disadvantaged members of the community in both Australia and developing countries.	
Ian Henry Pike	For service to the law as Chief Magistrate of New South Wales, to the reform of the civil justice system, and to the community, particularly through organ music.	
Phillip Elliott Playford	For service to geology, and to historical research on early Dutch exploration and shipwrecks in Australia.	
Michael Thomas Quinn	For service to business and commerce, and the automotive industry in particular, as an executive member of the board of Mitsubishi Motors Australia for 16 years, and managing director for 11 years.	
Dr Dorothy Jane Radford	For service to medicine and medical education, particularly in the area of neonatal and paediatric cardiology.	
Ronald Edwin Rankin	For service to the community, particularly through his involvement with surf lifesaving for over thirty years at club, state and national levels.	
Associate Professor Kevin Albert Rickard RFD	For service to medicine, particularly in the field of haematology and the problems associated with haemophilia, and for consultancies to the Royal Australian Navy and the Australian Defence Force.	
William Murray Rogers	For service to the food industry, particularly through the Australian Food Council and Kellogg (Australia) Pty Ltd and to the community.	
Cyril Joseph Rowe	For service to the advancement of the greyhound racing industry.	
John Francis Ryan	For service to the Northern Territory through business development, and to government boards and authorities.	
Phillip Halford Scanlan	For service to international relations, particularly Australian-American relations as the founder and inaugural chairman of the Australian-American Educational Leadership Dialogue, and to the community through the promotion of awareness of public health.	
Emeritus Professor George Seddon	For service to the preservation of environmental and cultural heritage through education and writing, and to the community through the promotion of town planning issues.	
Professor Fenton George Sharpe	For service to education, particularly administration, at secondary and tertiary levels.	
William Simpson	For service to the administration and business of government at local and state levels, in particular as Chairman of the NSW Commissioners of Inquiry for Environment and Planning since 1980 and previously as Chairman of the NSW Local Government and Town Planning Appeals Tribunal.	
Emeritus Professor Robert Henry Tufrey Smith	For service to the advancement of tertiary education, particularly through the Australian Education Office in North America, the Australian Vice-Chancellors Committee, the University of New England and the University of Western Australia, and to geography.	
David Welsford Smithers	For service to the community through the National Heart Foundation, and the Institute of Chartered Accountants, and to the Sydney 2000 Olympic Bid as a member of the Board and Chairman of the Finance Commission.	
Dr Donald James Bourne St John	For service to medicine, particularly in the field of gastroenterology and research into the causes and means of early detection of colorectal cancer.	
Harry Andrew Standfast	For service to science in the field of entomology, particularly research into veterinary virus vectors and mosquito control.	
Dr Neil Anthony Streten	For service to the science of meteorology and for improving understanding of the meteorology of Antarctica and its interrelation with the climate of Australia.	
Margaret May Tabberer	For service to the community, particularly through support for charitable organisations, and to the advancement of the Australian fashion industry.	
Professor Kenneth Taylor	For service to conservation and the environment through historic cultural landscape preservation and education.	
Professor Peter Lindsay Thompson	For service to medicine, particularly in the field of cardiology and coronary care, to the Australian Medical Association and to the National Heart Foundation.	
Dr Bryan Edmund Todd RFD, ED	For service to community health, particularly through the Queensland Asthma Foundation, the Society for Crippled Children and the Australian Medical Association, and for public service through the Corrective Services Commission and the Department of Veterans' Affairs.	
Professor David Lawrence Trimm	For service to research and teaching in the fields of chemical engineering and industrial chemistry, and as a practitioner of the science of catalysis and its propagation at an international level.	
Patrick John Underwood	For service to primary industry, particularly the cattle industry, and to the community.	
Leonard Frederick Willot Vickridge, OBE, VRD	For service to the community, particularly through the Carers Association of Australia and its support services for carers of people with dementia and the frail or aged.	
Albert Kevin Robert Watson	For service to the community through fundraising activities for charities, to commerce and to the arts.	
Eileen Mary Watt	For service to the community as both National and Victorian President of the War Widows Guild of Australia.	
Judith Mary White	For service to the community, particularly in the field of Australian history, to women, to the rural sector, to the arts and to economic development in the Hunter Region.	
Brigadier Donald Willett	For service to the community, particularly through the Royal United Services Institute, the Victoria League for Commonwealth Friendship, Toc H and the Joint Commonwealth Societies Council.	
Dr John Aubrey Henry Williamson	For service to medical research, particularly in the fields of hyperbaric medicine and marine envenomation, to the Surf Life Saving Association of Australia and to St John Ambulance Australia.	
Michael James Willson	For service to the environment at local, state and national levels, to tourism and to the community of Kangaroo Island.	
His Honour Judge Andrew Bray Cameron Wilson	For service to law, particularly criminology, and to the Australian Crime Prevention Council.	
Wilma Elizabeth Forster Young	For service to the welfare of ex-service personnel, particularly ex-servicewomen, and to the community.	
Dr Elwood Curtin Zimmerman	For service to entomology, particularly through scientific research in Australia and the Pacific Region and the philanthropic support of this research.	

==== Military Division ====
Branch	Recipient	Citation	Notes
Navy	Captain Brian Donald Robertson	For exceptional service to maritime warfare and as Commanding Officer of HMAS Perth.	
Navy	Captain Gordon Allan Wellham	For exceptional service to the Royal Australian Navy, in particular as Director Activity Based Management Project.	
Army	Colonel John Roby Cox	For exceptional service to the Australian Defence Force and the Australian Army, in particular Land Command, in the field of capability development.	
Army	Major General Timothy Roger Ford	In recognition of service to the Australian Army in the fields of Land Force Development and Operational Command.	
Army	Colonel Kenneth James Gillespie CSM	For exceptional service to the Australian Army and the Australian Defence Force, particularly in the development of the Australian Theatre Joint Intelligence Centre.	
Army	Major General Stephen Golding RFD	For exceptional service to the Army Reserve.	
Army	Brigadier Ross Lindsay Gordon Grant	For exceptional service to the Australian Army in the fields of Logistics and Material Management.	
Army	Colonel Colin McOlvin Sharp CSC	For exceptional service to the Australian Army in the field of Logistics.	
Army	Brigadier Duncan Robert Warren RFD	For exceptional service to the Australian Army in the fields of Training and Operations, in particular as Commander 5th Training Group and Commander 13th Brigade.	
Air Force	Wing Commander Alexander John Danischewski	For exceptional service to the Royal Australian Air Force in the field of Information Systems and Technology.	
Air Force	Air Vice-Marshall Neil Alexander Smith MBE	For exceptional service to the Australian Defence Force in the fields of Aeronautical Engineering and Logistic Support of Military Aviation.	

=== Medal (OAM) ===
==== General Division ====
Recipient	Citation	Notes
James Ashley Aitken	For service to the community of the Penrith District, particularly through youth welfare and service organisations and to local government.	
Albert John Alford	For service to the community of Casuarina as co-ordinator of the Senior Citizens Tuesday Club.	
Mildred Joyce Alford	For service to the community of Casuarina as co-ordinator of the Senior Citizens Tuesday Club.	
Richard Ernest Allchin	For service to the community of Caloundra particularly through the Caloundra Sub-Branch of the Returned and Services League of Australia and the Sunshine Coast Sub-Section of the Naval Association of Australia.	
Ian Bell Allen	For service to the rock-n-roll music industry and to youth.	
Brian Joseph Allom	For service to the horseracing industry and to the community.	
Noel Fraser Allom	For service to the welfare of veterans, particularly through the Kedron Wavell Sub-Branch of the Returned and Services League of Australia, and to fishing.	
John Gilbert Anderson	For service to the conservation of Norfolk Island's natural history as Foundation President of the Norfolk Island Conservation Society since 1976.	
Thomas Stewart Andrews	For service to school sports, particularly as a coach, organiser and team manager of primary school sports in Queensland.	
Vaivao John Elcombe Antonio	For service to the Pacific Islander and Polynesian communities.	
Pauline Arnold	For service to Orange and the surrounding district as a music teacher, accompanist, conductor, fundraiser, and founder of choirs.	
Beresford Francis Garnet Arthur	For service to veterans, particularly through the 8th Division Signals Association.	
Kathlyn Margaret Ballard	For service to fine arts, particularly as a water colour artist, to arts organisations and to art education.	
Muriel Paige Barrington	For service to the community as a volunteer for the Girl Guides Association of South Australia, and as foundation supervisor of the Warradale Meals on Wheels kitchen.	
Elizabeth Lauretta Barron	For service to nursing in North-Western Tasmania, particularly as an administrator.	
Margaret June Barton	For service to the community of Cockburn, particularly through the provision of children's services, and to local government.	
Margaret Joan Barton-Johnson	For service to the community, and in particular, the victims of domestic violence, through Bethany Family Homes and Jireh House.	
Arthur Beasley	For service to the residents of the Bowral district, particularly through community and service organisations.	
Reginald Beck	For service to the community of Proserpine for over 40 years, particularly as an honorary auditor for community organisations.	
John Bertram	For service to the community of Hamilton as a volunteer with local charities including the Red Cross, Meals on Wheels, and veterans organisations.	
The late John Andrew Blanch	For service to people with visual impairments through the Victorian Association for the Blind and the Victorian Blinded Soldiers' Association, and to the community.	
Marjorie Joyce Bowden	For service to community health in the Northern Territory, particularly through Alice Springs Health Services.	
Marie Constance Boyle, MBE	For service to the community and to veterans through the Australian Red Cross, and the Australian Women's Vietnam Veterans Association.	
Senior Sergeant John Geoffrey Brookes	For service to the Gippsland Region through his involvement with youth, the aged, sporting events and as an Aboriginal Liaison Officer.	
The Reverend William Arthur James Brown	For service to the community as an Honorary Padre to ex-service organisations for more than 27 years, and as a welfare, publicity officer and delegate to the Newcastle District Council of the R&SL of Australia.	
Clare May Bryson	For service to the community of Wauchope, particularly the aged.	
Brian Patrick Buggy	For service to music, particularly music education and to training and conducting youth orchestras and ensembles.	
June Mary Bullivant	For service to the community, particularly through the Granville Train Disaster Memorial Committee, the Granville Historical Society and Rotary.	
Sister Dora Elizabeth Burchill	For service to nursing, particularly as an historian, author and philanthropist.	
Harold James Burgess	For service to the advancement of amateur cycling.	
Donald Stanley Byrne	For service to the communities of Port Hedland and Newman as an industrial chaplain, and to the Baptist Church as a minister and missionary.	
Anthony Joseph Cadet-James	For service to road safety, particularly motorcycle rider education and training in the Northern Territory through the Road Safety Council and the Motorcycle Association.	
Elizabeth Mabel Caldwell	For service to the Uniting Church through the Lillian Martin Home and Scots Church, Hobart, and to the War Widows' Guild of Australia in Tasmania.	
Kelva Mary Campbell	For service as a voluntary fundraiser for the Juvenile Diabetes Foundation (Western Australia Chapter) and diabetes research.	
Peter Carne	For service to youth as a volunteer worker for many years in the education and coaching of students in mathematics.	
Nancy Ellen Carney	For service to the community, particularly through the Royal Victorian Institute for the Blind, the Red Cross and the Country Women's Association.	
Mollie Catchpole	For service to the community of Rosebud, particularly the aged and to the Rosebud Corps of the Salvation Army.	
Helen Cattalini	For service to the community through the promotion of tolerance, respect and understanding between people with different cultural backgrounds and histories.	
Alexina Lilian Chalmers	For service to the community of Portland, particularly through the Portland Council for the Encouragement of Music and the Arts, the Western Region of the Victorian Arts Council, the Green Triangle Arts Network and the Historic Buildings Restoration Committee.	
Elizabeth (Betty) Chambers	For service to the Royal Children's Hospital, Melbourne, through the Parkville Auxiliary.	
Iris Edna Chardon	For service to the South Australian Branch and Stirling Sub-Branch of the Returned and Services League of Australia Women's Auxiliaries, and to the community of Stirling.	
Kiu Choi Cheng	For service to the Chinese community as founding member and vice president of the Box Hill Chinese Elderly Citizens Club.	
Charles Campbell Coghlan	For service to the horseracing industry in Victoria through the Burrumbeet Park and Windermere Racing Club, the Ballarat Turf Club, and the Ballarat District Racing Association.	
The Reverend Vernon James Kedward Collins	For service to the community, particularly in the areas of chaplaincy and hospital administration.	
Arthur Aloysius Commerford	For service to the community, particularly the aged, as the instigator of the Grafton Community Bus Service.	
Maxwell Joseph Lorimer Cooke	For service to music education, particularly piano pedagogy and the development of music students.	
Ernest Alexander Cork	For service to the community of Dorrigo through agricultural and sporting organisations.	
Yvonne May Cowling	For service to conservation, particularly as a registered wildlife shelter operator and educator.	
Jennifer Mary Crew	For service to the Armidale community, particularly through the North and North-West Community Legal Centre, the Guyra Local Aboriginal Land Council and other community organisations.	
John Frederick Crowther	For service to local government through the Lismore City Council and to the community.	
Noel David Cullane	For service to the rural community of the Cowra and Canowindra Districts particularly through river and farm management improvements initiatives and the Rivers Bush Fire Brigade.	
Rodney Neville Cullen	For service to the Australian sugar industry through the Sugar Research Institute, Mackay, and the Bundaberg Sugar Community.	
Robert Edward Charles Cure	For service to the community as a radio broadcaster, and in particular as presenter of the ABC Breakfast Show on Radio 7ZR.	
Sylvester Claude Davey	For service to the community of South West Rocks as an honorary treasurer and auditor for community, sporting and charitable organisations.	
Ype Dominicus de Bruin	For service to the Dutch community in Australia, particularly in the areas of culture, welfare and aged care.	
William Thomas Dedman	For service to the veteran community as a hospital visitor, welfare officer and advocate for the Australian Federation of Totally and Permanently Incapacitated Ex-Servicemen and Women (WA Branch).	
George Andrew Derham	For service to veterans, particularly through the Returned and Services League of Australia, Victorian Branch, and the Totally and Permanently Disabled Soldiers' Association of Victoria.	
Stuart Henry Dibley	For service to veterans, particularly through the Newcastle Branch of the RAAF Association, and to the community.	
Isabelle Hewitt Dickson	For service to the community of Brighton, particularly through St Philip's Anglican Church and the Red Cross.	
Norman Mons Dickson	For service to the community of Brighton, particularly through the Senior Citizens Club.	
Dr Mervyn Harold Doobov	For service to the religious and cultural support of the Jewish community in the Australian Capital Territory.	
Suzanne Rose Doobov	For service to the religious and cultural support of the Jewish community in the Australian Capital Territory.	
Thomas John Doyle	For service to business and commerce as a restaurateur and to the community through charitable organisations.	
The Reverend Frank Maxwell Drysdale	For service to the community, to education through the invention of the game 'Numero' and to the Uniting Church in Australia.	
Tjerk Carolus Dusseldorp	For service to education and to the community through the establishment of the Workskill Australia Foundation.	
Frederick Cullen Dyett	For service to the real estate industry and to the community of Bendigo.	
George Savvas Eleftheriades	For service to the Greek and wider community particularly through the Hellenic Advancement Council, as the Collegiarch of the Athenaeum, the Greek Orthodox Christian Society and the St Nicholas Australian Settlement Union.	
Dr Robert Cecil Englebrecht	For service to rural medicine, corrective services, and the community of Cooma.	
The late Brian William Esler	For service to the community of Albury and District, the Hume Permanent Building Society and the Rotary Club of Albury.	
The late Harold Percy Evans	For service to music as a composer and conductor and as the musical director of the Coffs Harbour City Voice Choir.	
James Frederick Evans	For service to lawn bowls at international, national, state, district and club levels.	
Dr Lloyd Lindsay Carey Evans	For service to medicine, particularly in the field of general practice, and to the Stirling community.	
Ronald Douglas Faraday	For service to swimming through the Northern District Swimming Association and the New South Wales Amateur Swimming Association, and to the community.	
Dawn Lillian Ferguson	For service to the GFS – an Anglican Ministry and to the Linnet Choirs of Sydney.	
John Lindsay (Jack) Fitzgerald	For service to veterans as Secretary of the Ex-Prisoners of War and Relatives Association of Victoria.	
Shirley Elizabeth Fitzgerald	For service to the community through breast cancer support services and fundraising to benefit research.	
Sister Naomi Joy Fogarty	For service to the Aboriginal community as a health educator and nurse.	
Pauline Frances Forbutt	For service to swimming, as an instructor in Young, and as a referee at club, district, country, state and national championships.	
Michael Foster	For service to the community of the Australian Capital Territory, particularly through jazz music and rugby union football as a benefactor and administrator, and to journalism.	
Thomas Patrick Foster	For service to the community of Mandurama particularly through Lions Club International, Leos and the fire brigade.	
Stanley Max Paul Fowler	For service to the heavy horse industry, particularly as a breeder, exhibitor and judge in promoting the Clydesdale horse breed.	
Henry James Fox	For service to the community through the Family and Friends of Missing Persons Group Inc.	
Ian Leslie Fuzzard	For service to the Berrigan community through local government, service groups, sporting clubs and church committees.	
John Bernard Gaffney	For service to the Victorian justice system as registrar of the Court of Appeal, to the community and to sport.	
Faye Gloria Gardam	For service to the community of the North West Coast of Tasmania as a social historian on local and maritime history.	
Mack Gardner	In recognition of service to the Aboriginal community, particularly the Martu community as a leader and custodian of their heritage	
John Andrew Glover	For service to local government, particularly through the Yass and Goodradigbee Shire Councils, and to the community.	
Linda Iris Hale	For service to the community through the Music and Drama Cultural Committee of the Queensland Country Women's Association and through the Surfers Paradise Branch.	
John Hall	For service to the community and to music as the Conductor of the Adelaide Harmony Choir, and as an organist, teacher, and accompanist.	
John William Hall	For service to surf lifesaving and to Australian Rules football.	
Ronald Douglas Hall	For service to the welfare of veterans and to the community.	
Sister Carmel Mary Hanson	For service to social welfare, particularly through the provision of care and support for many disadvantaged groups.	
Dr James Scott Harbison	For service to the community of Bowral, particularly through the Harbison Memorial Retirement Village.	
Lyndon Clifford Harris	For service to sport through cricket and football organisations in the Derwent Valley.	
Katherine Osborne Harrison	For service to the local community, in particular the Shoalhaven Historical Society.	
Keith Edward Hawke	For service to rugby union football in the Australian Capital Territory for more than 50 years as a player, coach, selector and administrator.	
Jocelyn Penelope Fancourt Hebbard	For service to the community, particularly through the ANU Club for Women, the Abbeyfield Society, the Anglican Church and youth organisations.	
Philip Thomas Hennessey	For service to local government engineering, as Director of Engineering Services for Redland Shire Council.	
John Norris Henry	For service to the aged, particularly through meals on wheels and the provisions of transport to medical appointments.	
Athol Harold Hetherington	For service to the community through the Temora Swimming Club and Learn to Swim campaigns.	
Dr Stephen Hinchy	For service to rowing at club, state and national levels as an administrator and team medical officer.	
Shirley Anne Holloway	For service to the community of Flinders Island, in particular as Mayor of the Flinders Island Municipality.	
Enid Dixon Home	For service to the community of Albany as a fundraiser and voluntary worker with service organisations and community groups.	
Donald Kingston Hones	For service to the Pacific Islander community, particularly as a voluntary English and second language teacher and tutor and through the counselling and support of youth within the juvenile justice system.	
Paul Douglas Hope	For service to the welfare of veterans through fundraising activities to establish memorials to servicemen who died in the Battle of Milne Bay and at Gona, and to providing medical facilities for the people of Gona and Buna, Papua New Guinea.	
Walter Charles Hopkins	For service to youth, particularly through Scouts Australia and the YMCA, and to the community.	
Merven Arnold Hoppner	For service to the community of Wynnum-Manly through sports activities, particularly for youth, and to Rugby League as a member of the judiciary of the Brisbane Rugby League for over 30 years.	
Dr Gregory David Hotchkis	For service to the development of special educational curriculum and research.	
Peter Gordon Howarth	For service to the community, as founder of the Primary Club of Australia, and as a fundraiser for charitable organisations involved in meeting the sporting and recreational needs of people with disabilities.	
Alan Noel Hudson	For service to the community of Port Stephens, through the Royal Volunteer Coastal Patrol and the Nelson Head Lighthouse Trust.	
Jade Hurley	For service to the entertainment industry and to the community, particularly in the area of fundraising for groups including the Arthritis Foundation of NSW, the Australian Cancer Foundation for Medical Research and Camp Quality.	
Keith James Irwin	For service to the veterans of the 36th Battalion, particularly as the President and Editor of the Association's journal 'Marching On', for over 35 years.	
Laura Mary Ivey	For service to the community as a fundraiser for the Cancer Research Institute of Western Australia and for other charitable organisations.	
Alfred Brian Maxwell James	For service to the community and to cricket through the Hornsby Ku-ring-gai and Hills District Cricket Association, the Interdistrict Cricket Association and the Northern Metropolitan Cricket Council.	
Wendy May James	For service to the community through the promotion of women's issues in the Northern Territory.	
William Jones	For service to veterans through the Returned and Services League of Australia at state, district and local levels, to local government and to the community.	
Keith William Joyce	For service to the community of the Coburg District, particularly as Chairman of Trustees of the Fawkner Crematorium and Memorial Park to local government, to the Coburg Historical Society and to service organisations.	
Anatol Karel	For service to the Russian community in Melbourne, particularly through the St John of Kronstadt-Russian Welfare Society, the Russian Orthodox Church, and in the field of ethnic broadcasting.	
Elizabeth Norma Kean	For service to the communities of Castle Hill and Baulkham Hills, particularly through the Hills Community Aid and Information Service and the Australian Red Cross, New South Wales Division.	
Alan Blair Kell	For service to church and community organisations, in particular as chairman of the Board of Woodfield Lodge and Nursing Home, to the Royal Agricultural Society of New South Wales, and to the construction industry.	
Associate Professor John Patrick Kennedy	For service to agricultural education, to the sheep and wool industries, and to the community.	
Marshall William Kropp	For service to the community through the Currumbin Beach Vikings Surf Life Saving Club for over 50 years as president, patron and lifeguard, and to the Gold Coast City Council.	
Betty Lurline Kruse	For service to community health, particularly as a diabetes educator in the Northern Rivers District.	
Terence John (Terry) Lamb	For service to the sport of Rugby League football and to the community through fundraising.	
Roy Esmond Law	For service to the community, particularly to veterans through the Gunnedah Sub-Branch of the Returned and Services League of Australia.	
The Very Reverend Graeme Russell Lawrence	For service to the Anglican Church and to the community, particularly as a fundraiser and administrator during the restoration of the earthquake damage to Christ Church Cathedral in Newcastle.	
Iris May Lawrence	For service to the community of Newcastle, particularly in the area of veterans' welfare, and to the Newcastle Surf Life Saving Club.	
Margaret Linton	For service to the community of Dunolly and district, particularly youth, through the Girl Guide movement.	
Arthur Litis	For service to the community as a benefactor for charity, particularly the ACTIV Foundation, and to the Greek community of Western Australia.	
Iris Litis	For service to the community as a benefactor for charity, particularly the ACTIV Foundation, and to the Greek community of Western Australia.	
Ralph Mervyn Lucas	For service to floriculture in South Australia as a grower, administrator and judge.	
Amelia Dorothy Ludwell	For service to the welfare of aged people as a volunteer with the auxiliaries of the Royal Freemasons' Homes Victoria and the Alfred Hospital.	
Ilmars Lusis	For service to the Latvian community of South Australia.	
Charles Kevin McCormick	For service to the Bankstown community through sporting organisations, aged persons' associations, schools, charities and youth groups.	
Kevin Alister McDougall	For service to rugby league football, at both senior and junior levels.	
Alan Macfarlane ED	For service to the community, particularly through the 2/24 Australian Infantry Battalion Association.	
William Francis McGinty	For service to local government through the Swan Hill Shire Council, and to the community of Robinvale.	
Jane Alice Camilla Macgowan	For service to the arts through the establishment and support of the Brandling Street Studios in Alexandria, Sydney.	
Kenneth Albert McKeown	For service to photography at local, state, national and international levels.	
William John McManus	For service to the local community, particularly through the Yass District Hospital Board and the Yass Committee for the Care of the Aged.	
The late Sister Marie Bernarde Madigan	For service to the arts as a music teacher and for her research on Dame Joan Sutherland's career and contribution to opera.	
The late Anthony Manicaros	For service to ethnic broadcasting in Australia, particularly through the Ethnic Broadcasting Association of Queensland and the National Ethnic and Multicultural Broadcasters Council.	
William Leonard Marr	For service to primary industry as a breeder and exhibitor of poultry, particularly the Ancona bantam breed.	
Raymond Marriott	For service to youth, particularly through the scouting movement, and to the community.	
Sidney Plassy Marshall	For service to the NSW Branch of the Ex-Prisoners of War Association and to youth through scouting.	
Dorothy Mathison	For service to the community, particularly the Queensland Country Women's Association.	
Peter Stuart Meeking	For service to local government, disaster management, the Australian Institute of Valuers and Land Economists, and to the community.	
Dr Anne Margaret Mijch	For service to medicine, particularly in the treatment and care given to patients with infectious diseases including HIV/AIDS.	
John Francis Miller	For service to people with impaired hearing through the John Pierce Centre, and to the community.	
Francis Leo Mills	For service to the community, in particular through bushfire prevention measures.	
Lorna Mobbs	For service to the community, in particular to the Randwick and Coogee Ladies Swimming Club and as a fundraiser for the Randwick Lantern Club for Deaf and Blind Children.	
Peter Thomas Mobbs	For service to greenkeeping and to lawn bowls.	
Frank Moore Montgomery	For service to community and charitable organisations, particularly as a financial administrator.	
John Osborne Moon	For service to the community of Cowra, particularly through service clubs and welfare organisations.	
Jean Ayala Moore	For service to the community, and in particular to people with disabilities, through crossroad Queensland and the Ipswich Blue Nursing Service auxiliary.	
Janice Blair Morris	For service to education, in particular to children with special needs, and to disadvantaged youth as a foster parent.	
Colin Harry Morwood	For service to the community and to gymnastics.	
Major Heather Joy Moulden	For service to children, families and youth, particularly through the Salvation Army.	
William Thomas John Moyes	For service to hang gliding as a manufacturer and as a promoter of competition and the use of safer equipment and techniques.	
Dr George Friedrich Mutze	For service to the Saddleworth community as a general practitioner and to the Lutheran Church.	
Magdalena Nagy	For service to multiculturalism, particularly through the Hungarian community and to the welfare of aged people and disadvantaged youth.	
Ellen Kathleen Nash	For service to women through the Catholic Women's League and the Country Women's Association of Tasmania.	
Brian Nebenzahl RFD	For service to the publishing industry, and to the community.	
Dr Ian Douglas Nichols	For service to the community of Wynyard, in particular to the SpencerPark Homes for Aged People and the Lions Club.	
Geraldine Shirley Dakin Nolan	For service to the community of Corowa, in particular, through organisations involved in commemorating historic events and to the welfare of aged people.	
Elaine Maude O'Brien	For service to the community, in particular, through the Order of the Eastern Star as Secretary of the United Grand Chapter of Australia.	
Albert George Thomas O'Cass	For service to the horseracing industry, particularly as President of the NSW Master Farriers Association and as President of the National Farriers Association of Australia.	
Evelyn Shirley O'Donnell	For service to youth through school, sporting and service organisations.	
The Reverend Father Vincent Benedict O'Donoghue	For service to the Catholic Church as a missionary and parish priest.	
Shirley Ellen O'Reilly	For service to netball in the Port Augusta area and as a player, coach, administrator, umpire and fundraiser.	
Peter John O'Rorke	For service to the Lake Bolac community, particularly through local government, rural bushfire brigades, and surf lifesaving associations.	
Constance Ord	For service to the performing arts as artistic director of the Old Mill Theatre, Perth.	
Eva Elizabeth Osborne	For service to youth as a music teacher, Sunday School teacher, and as a leader and counsellor for scouts, guides and youth fellowship members.	
Ross Henry George Panton	For service to local government, and to the community of Narrabri and surrounding districts.	
Robert Edward Charles Parker	For service to the community of Dubbo, particularly through organisations caring for the aged, youth and the disadvantaged.	
Alice Uletta Patterson	For service to the community of Ipswich, particularly through arts and heritage organisations.	
The late Geoffrey Mark Pearce	For service to the community through raising public awareness of AIDS related issues.	
Robert James Pearce	For service to music, particularly through the pipe band movement as a player, tutor, administrator, adjudicator and craftsman.	
Jean Valerie Peare	For service to netball and to the community of the Hawkesbury district.	
Astley George Pearse	For service to children and adolescents through the Wagga and District Pony Club.	
Penelope Ann Penhall	For service to education through the development of the Learning Assistance Programme.	
Lionel Fancis Perry	For service to the Gold Coast community, in particular, through Rotary, Meals on Wheels, and surf lifesaving.	
Izabella Picheta	For service to the Polish community in South Australia, particularly through the Federation of Polish Organisations and the Polish Women's Circle.	
John Ronald Pickering	For service to podiatry, particularly in the areas of surgery and education.	
Joyce Mary Pope	For service to the community of Ashburton and Glen Iris for over thirty-five years.	
Joan Frances Priest	For service to literature as a writer and as a supporter of other writers.	
Stanley Douglas Prosser	For service to the conservation and continuing environmental management of Lake Illawarra.	
David Lyle Purnell	For service to the community, in particular as an advocate for social justice, peacemaking and reconciliation, and to the Society of Friends (Quakers).	
John Henry Puttnam	For service to the community, particularly to the welfare of ex-service personnel and their families.	
Beverley Ann Radmore	For service to nursing, in particular at Mount Druitt and Blacktown Hospitals, in the field of stomal therapy.	
Ian Septimus Rainford ED	For service to the community through civic, service and charitable organisations.	
Olga Padmavati Ramasamy	For service to the community, particularly through the Australian Asian Association, and to women through the National Council of Women of Western Australia and the Pan Pacific and South East Asia Women's Association.	
Dorothy Ellen Ransom	For service to the community in particular, through the Australian Federation of University Women and the Senate of the University of Western Australia.	
Bernice Marjorie Ravenscroft	For service to the community, particularly youth, through the Suicide Prevention Agency Samaritan Befrienders in Perth.	
Dr Robert James Rawson	For service to youth, in particular, as State Director of the Scripture Union of Queensland.	
Nita Isobel Reed	For service to the Taree and district community, in particular, through the Mid North Coast Kidney Association.	
Thomas Ashton Reed	For service to the community of Orange and to the Prisoners of War Association.	
John Ashley Reeves	For service to the surf lifesaving movement at club, state and national levels.	
Associate Professor Peter John Reichenbach	For service to physical education and sports science, and to the community.	
Neil Edward Reid	For service to students with physical or intellectual impairments as Principal of Geebung Special School.	
Ene Mai Reinpuu	For service to the Estonian community, particularly as president and Honorary Secretary of the Estonian Society of Adelaide, and as Honorary Secretary of the Council of Estonian Societies in Australia.	
Clifford Bernard Richards	For service to the community, particularly in the area of industrial relations, and to Australia Post.	
Richard John Rodda	For service to the South Australian Olympic Council and the South Australian Commonwealth Games Association.	
Henry Holder Rogers	For service to the community of Horsham, particularly through the Gorsham Sub-Branch of the Returned and Services League of Australia.	
Dr Wendell John Rosevear	For service to medicine in the prevention of drug, alcohol and sexual abuse and to the treatment and counselling of people with HIV/AIDS.	
Enid Leone Ross	For service to the community through Kantane Child and Family Health Services.	
John Anthony Saunders	For service to people with impaired vision as a reader for the Hear-A-Book service, and to the community.	
Gloria Helen Schultz	For service to the community, in particular, through fundraising for a mobile mammography van to service rural areas of southern New South Wales.	
George Leslie Schwennesen	For service to the community of Surat and to local government, in particular as Mayor of Warroo Shire Council.	
Frederick Moffat Scott	For service to youth through the Scout Association of Australia.	
Ivy-May Sheahan	For service to the community, in particular, through the Australian Consumers Association.	
Norma May Shuttlewood	For service to the community through the Mackay Eisteddfod Committee and the Catholic Women's League Australia.	
Valda Marie Silvy	For service to the arts in the Penrith area, particularly through the Joan Sutherland Performing Arts Centre.	
Paul Otto Sitzler	For service to construction development in the Northern Territory, and to the community, particularly through service clubs.	
Arthur William Thomas Smith	For service to the community, particularly through hockey, Australian Rules football and surf lifesaving organisations.	
Charles Redmond Smith	For service to the community, particularly to people with disabilities through the Self Help Organisation.	
Edward Allan Smith	For service to the Shoalhaven community as a fundraiser and entertainer with the 'Shoalhaven Singers'.	
James Maxwell Smith AFSM	For service to the community of Stanley, in particular, through the Circular Head Council and as Chief of the Stanley Fire Brigade.	
John Richard Spooner	For service to youth, particularly through the Peer Support Foundation Ltd, the Manly Warringah Youth Accommodation Association and the Northern Beaches Youth Community Fund.	
Frank Thomas Stagg	For service to the community through the Melbourne Lord Mayor's Charitable Fund for Metropolitan Hospitals and Charities.	
Reverend Ronald Douglas Stancombe	For service to the Anglican Church as an Honorary Deacon and to the community, particularly the welfare of aged people.	
William Barrie Statham	For service to the community of Macleay Island, in particular as a volunteer with the ambulance and bush fire service.	
Beatrice Anne Stone	For service to youth through the Guiding and Scouting movements, and to environmental education programmes.	
Robert Summerton	For service to the veteran community, in particular, through the Totally and Permanently Disabled Soldiers Association of Victoria.	
John William Sunners	For service to the community, in particular to youth, through the Scouting movement in South Australia.	
Wallace Charles Sutherland, MBE	For service to veterans, in particular, through the Tasmanian Branch of the Returned and Services League of Australia.	
The late Ailsa Macvey Swan	For service to conservation of the environment, particularly in the study and preservation of Australia's ornithological heritage.	
Thomas Peter Synan	For service to the Gippsland community and to local government.	
Eileen Faith Tasker	For service to the performing arts as the principal teacher of ballet at the National Theatre Ballet School.	
The Most Reverend Father Marcos Khella Tawfik	For service to the community as a priest of the Coptic Orthodox Church in New South Wales.	
William Joseph Thomas	For service to the community of Walbundrie and to Australian Rules football.	
Thomas William Foster Thorpe	For service to the communities of Box Hill and Burwood, through local government and to youth through the scouting movement.	
Patricia Madeline Tompkins	For service to the ex-service community.	
Margaret Forsyth Tucker	For service to establishing and developing the blueberry industry in Australia, in particular as a grower and as an executive member of the Australian Blueberry Growers Association.	
Luigi Angelo Tuia	For service to the community, in particular to the welfare of people in residential aged care services, and to local government.	
William Durrant Upson	For service to the music industry in Western Australia.	
Muriel Nina Valentine	For service to the community of Ballarat.	
Donald Henry Vallance	For service to veterans through the Walpeup Sub-Branch of the Returned and Services League of Australia, and to the community.	
Amelia Joan Van Houten	For service to the community through the Doncaster Pocket Theatre.	
John Charles Veszely	For service to the Hungarian community in Perth.	
Charles Norman Wallace	For service to the community of Port Macdonnell and District and to veterans through the Port Macdonnell Sub-Branch of the Returned and Services League of Australia.	
Colleen Patricia Wardell	For service to the community through the Asthma Foundation of New South Wales.	
Judith Alison Warden	For service to the community through health care organisations.	
Dr William Webb	For service to sports medicine, in particular as the Principal Medical Officer for Australian Rowing.	
Ian Charles Westrip	For service to the arts, in particular music, as a teacher and performer in Western Australia.	
Edward Roy Whitehead	For service to lawn bowls and to the community of Rushworth.	
Bernard Williams	For service to the community through the Redcliffe Sub-Branch of the Returned and Services League of Australia.	
Claris Dulcie Williams	For service to the Monto community in the provision of health services and facilities for the care of aged people.	
David George Williams	For service to soccer as a competitor, administrator, journalist and commentator for over fifty years.	
Leslie Cameron Williams	For service to conservation of the environment in the Edithvale-Seaford area, and to local government and the community.	
George Robert Willoughby	For service to hockey and to the community of Henley and Grange.	
Patricia Adeline Wilson	For service to the community of McMinns Lagoon through the Keep Australia Beautiful campaign, the McMinns Lagoon Reserve Association and the McMinns Lagoon Volunteer Fire Brigade.	
Beatrice Blanch (Queenie) Witte	For service to the community through the Wollongong branch of the Country Women's Association.	
Marjorie Wagner Wood	For service to youth through the Girl Guides Association of Australia and the Conference of Australian Youth Organisations.	
Brian Barry Woods	For service to the community as a fundraiser and entertainer.	
Linley Delys Woods	For service to the community as a volunteer hospital worker at the Royal Perth Hospital.	
Donald John Woon	For service to the community, to local government, and to cricket through the South Australian Cricket Association and the Australian Country Cricket Council.	
Roslyn Christine Worthington	For service to children with life-threatening illnesses through the Make-a-Wish Foundation.	
Abdul Majid Zahra	For service to the community through the Ethnic Child Care Family and Community Services Co-operative Limited, NSW.	

==== Military Division ====
Branch	Recipient	Citation	Notes
Navy	Warrant Officer Terrence James Rowell	For meritorious service to the Royal Australian Navy Submarine Squadron and to the Royal Australian Navy Submarine Escape Training Facility.	
Navy	Chief Petty Officer Trevor Charles Smee	For meritorious service to the Royal Australian Navy in particular as the Senior Non-Commissioned Officer-in-Charge of the Communications Section, Weapons Electrical Mobile Operational Technical Unit, Maritime Command.	
Navy	Commander Paul Anton Field	For meritorious service as Principal Staff Officer to the Chief of Logistics, Support Command Australia (Navy).	
Navy	Warrant Officer Garry James McDonald	For meritorious service to the Royal Australian Navy in the fields of Personnel Management and the Management of Service Messes.	
Army	Warrant Officer Class One Garry John Alterator	For meritorious service to the Australian Army as the Regimental Sergeant to the Australian Army as the Regimental Sergeant Major of 1st Field Hospital, School of Army Health and South Queensland Logistic Group.	
Army	Warrant Officer Class Two Brendan Francis Downs	For meritorious service to the Australian Army in the field of Electrical and Mechanical Engineering.	
Army	Warrant Officer Class One Danny John Hawkins	For meritorious service to the Australian Army in particular as Regimental Sergeant Major of Base Administrative Support Centre, Randwick and Headquarters Logistic Support Force.	
Army	Warrant Officer Class One Darryl John Kelly	For meritorious service to the Australian Army as Regimental Sergeant Major of the 7th Field Regiment and of the Base Administrative Support Centre, Liverpool, New South Wales.	
Army	Warrant Officer Class One John William Sturgeon	For meritorious service to the Australian Army and the Royal Australian Air Force in the field of Aircraft Logistic Support.	
Army	Warrant Officer Class One Stephen Charles Ward	For meritorious service to the Australian Army, particularly in Regimental and Training Appointments.	
Air Force	Warrant Officer Cecil John Boshammer	For meritorious service to the Royal Australian Air Force as a Flight Engineer.	
Air Force	Chaplain Douglas Reginald Parker RFD	For meritorious service to the Royal Australian Air Force as a chaplain in the Reserve Force.	
Air Force	Warrant Officer Richard Salt	For meritorious service to the Royal Australian Air Force in the field of Operational Maintenance for the C130 Hercules aircraft.	
