= Ern Manea =

Australian politician (1926–2013)

Ern Manea AO

Mayor of Bunbury
- In office 1966–1972
- Preceded by: E. A. Cooke
- Succeeded by: Patrick Usher
- In office 1988–1997
- Preceded by: A. G. McKenzie
- Succeeded by: John Castrilli

Personal details
- Born: Ernest Cosmo Manea; 23 December 1926 Albany, Western Australia
- Died: 16 October 2013 (aged 86) Bunbury, Western Australia
- Resting place: Bunbury Cemetery
- Spouse: Claudine Beulah "Snookie" Manea
- Education: University of Western Australia; University of Adelaide
- Occupation: General practitioner

Ernest Cosmo Manea AO (23 December 1926 – 16 October 2013) was a prominent figure in the city of Bunbury, Western Australia. He was the mayor of Bunbury from 1966 to 1972 and again from 1988 to 1997, making him the city's longest-serving mayor. He worked as a general practitioner and was a patron, board member, chairman or president of over 300 organisations.

== Early life ==
Manea was born in Albany, Western Australia, on 23 December 1926. He was of Irish and Greek descent. He completed secondary education by the time he was 15, having skipped several years of school.

== Career ==
Manea studied medicine at the University of Western Australia and the University of Adelaide, and then took an internship at Royal Perth Hospital. He moved to Bunbury, Western Australia, on 18 May 1952 to join a medical practice. He became a member of South Bunbury Football Club and became a life member when he was 30.

He was the City of Bunbury's (Note: Town of Bunbury prior to 1979.) longest serving mayor. His first term as mayor was from 1966 to 1972 and his second term was from 1988 to 1997.

He was the inaugural chairman of the South West Development Commission and served on the boards of St John of God Hospital Bunbury, the TAB, GWN7, Landcorp among others. He had an interest in harness racing which was developed while a medical student in Adelaide. He was the president of the Bunbury Trotting Club, the Western Australia Trotting Association, the Inter Dominion Harness Racing Council and the International Trotting Association. He was president of South Bunbury Football Club and the Bunbury District Football Association at times. Manea lobbied for Edith Cowan University to establish a campus in Bunbury, and served on its board when it was created in 1986. In total, he was a patron or board member of over 300 organisations.

During his career, he was approached by the Liberal, Labor and National parties to try to get him to stand as a candidate for their parties in state politics, but he declined the offers.

In 2002, Manea left the medical practice he had been working at since 1952 to create his own. He retired in 2010. In total, he had delivered 3,581 babies.

== Personal life ==
Manea married Claudine Beulah "Snookie" Snook, who was a nurse he met in 1952 while at Royal Perth Hospital. She gave birth to two sons. He is also the adoptive father of Syd Jackson, who was a Stolen Generations child living at the Roelands Aboriginal Mission. Jackson became a talented footballer, playing for South Bunbury in the South West Football League, East Perth in the West Australian Football League, and Carlton in the Victorian Football League.

A book about Manea's life, Manea: The Story of a Remarkable Life – the tale of Dr Ern Manea's amazing exploits by Baden Pratt, was released in November 2012.

Manea died in his sleep on 16 October 2013, aged 86. He was survived by his wife, three sons and five grandchildren. His wife Snookie died in January 2017. Bunbury Mayor David Smith paid tribute to Manea, saying "I do not believe there has been any one in my lifetime who has contributed more to Bunbury and the South West." His funeral took place at St Patrick's Cathedral, Bunbury, and he was buried at Bunbury Cemetery.

== Awards and honours ==
Manea was one of the first recipients of the Local Government Medal.

In the 1985 Australia Day Honours, Manea was appointed as a member of the Order of Australia for "service to the community of Bunbury and to local government." In the 1998 Queen's Birthday Honours, he was appointed as an officer of the Order of Australia for "service to the community of Bunbury, to local government, to regional planning and development, and to the advancement of the harness racing industry."

In 1997, the City of Bunbury appointed Manea and his wife as Honorary Freeman of the City, the highest honour that a local government can give. They were the first people to be given the honour, and since then, it has been given two more times, to John Castrilli and Loretta Castrilli in 2017.

Manea Senior College, which opened in 2009 in the Bunbury suburb of College Grove, is named after Manea and his wife after he accepted an offer from Education and Training Minister Alan Carpenter in 2004 for the school to be named after him.

The match between South Bunbury and Donnybrook in the South West Football League has been known as the Manea Cup since 2014.
