= List of mayors of Bunbury =

The City of Bunbury is a local government area in the South West region of Western Australia. It was formed on 21 February 1871 as the Municipality of Bunbury and has had a mayor since June 1887 in celebration of the Golden Jubilee of Queen Victoria. On 23 June 1961, following the passage of the Local Government Act 1960, the municipality was renamed to the Town of Bunbury. On 31 August 1979, upon reaching the required population, the town was renamed to its present name, the City of Bunbury.

== Municipality of Bunbury ==
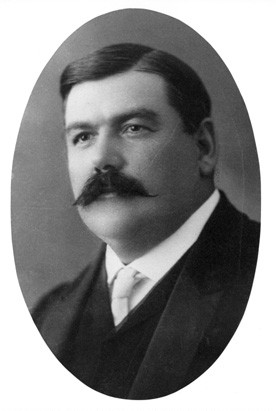
Newton Moore, who later became Premier of Western Australia

Mayor	Term	Ref
Charles Wisbey	1887	
Ephraim Mayo Clarke	1887–1888	
Charles Wisbey	1888–1890	
William Spencer	1891–1893	
Charles Wisbey	1893–1894	
Ephraim Mayo Clarke	1894–1897	
James Moore	1897–1898	
Ephraim Mayo Clarke	1899–1901	
Newton James Moore	1901–1904	
C. E. Spencer	1905–1906	
Harry Brashaw	1906–1907	
Ephraim Mayo Clarke	1908	
Frederick Walter Steere	1909–1910	
Charles E. Frankel	1910–1914	
G. E. Clarke	1915–1916	
J. G. Baldock	1917–1918	
William Lemen Thomas	1919	
J. G. Baldock	1920	
W. L. Thomas	1921	
George Tipping	1921–1922	
G. E. Reading	1923	
G. E. Clarke	1924	
W. J. J. Skewes	1925–1926	
G. E. Reading	1927	
J. G. Baldock	1928	
J. E. Hands	1928–1933	
J. E. Reading	1934–1935	
J. J. P. Verschuer	1937	
J. E. Hands	1937–1938	
J. T. Blair	1939–1943	
Percy C. Payne	1944–1951	
Frederick Withers	1951–1955	
Percy C. Payne	1955–1958	
W. E. McKenna	1958–1959	
F. R. Hay	1959–1961	

== Town of Bunbury ==
Mayor	Term	Ref
F. R. Hay	1961–1962	
A. H. Wilson	1963–1966	
Edward Arthur Cooke	1966	
Ern Manea	1966–1972	
P. J. Usher	1972–1979	

== City of Bunbury ==
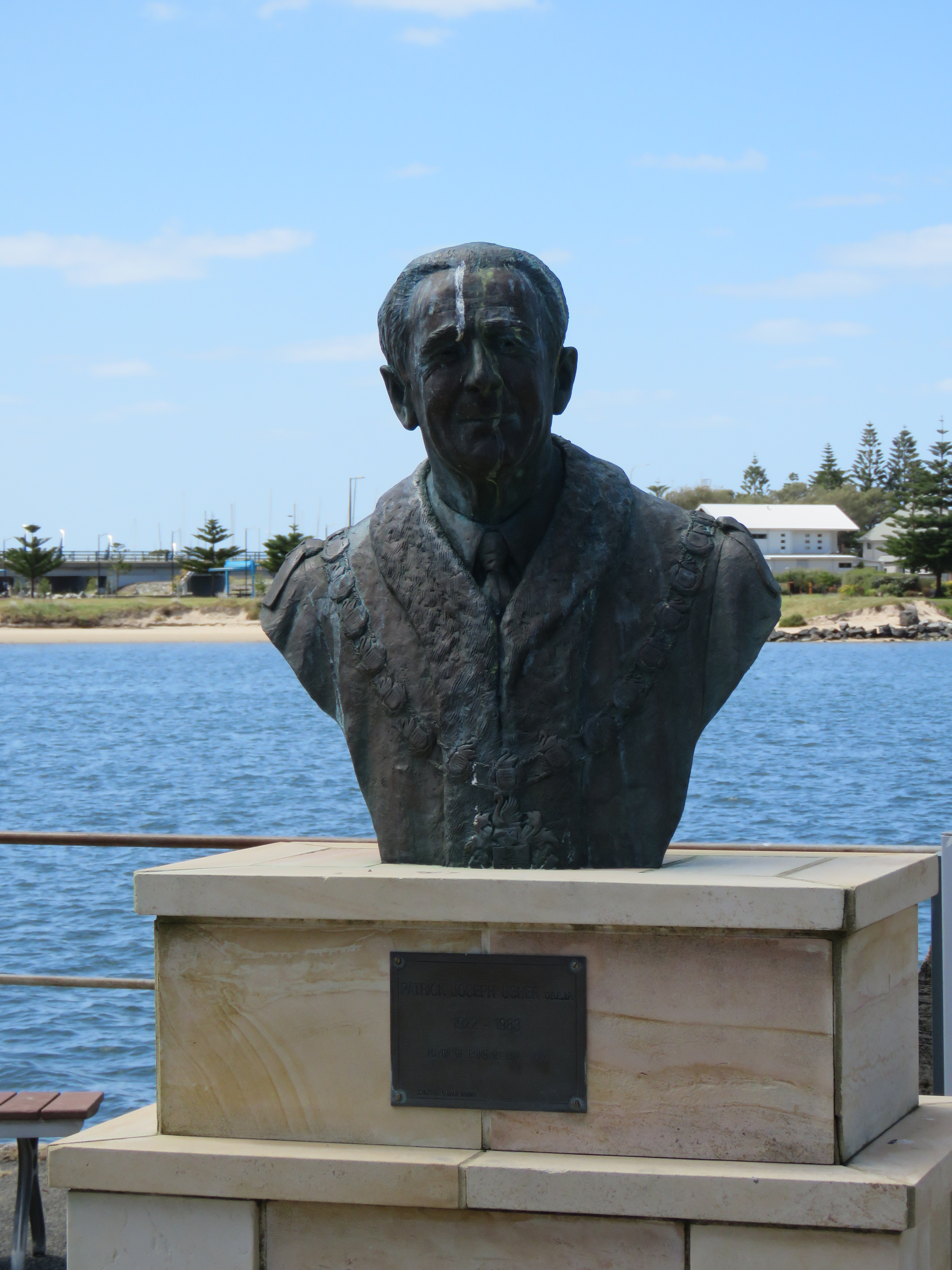
Bust of Patrick Josef Usher

Mayor	Term	Ref
P. J. Usher	1979–1983	
A. G. McKenzie	1983–1988	
Ern Manea	1988–1997	
John Castrilli	1997–2005	
David Smith	2005–2013	
Gary Brennan	2013–2021	
Jaysen De San Miguel	2021–present	
