= Bunbury Road District =

Former Australian local government area

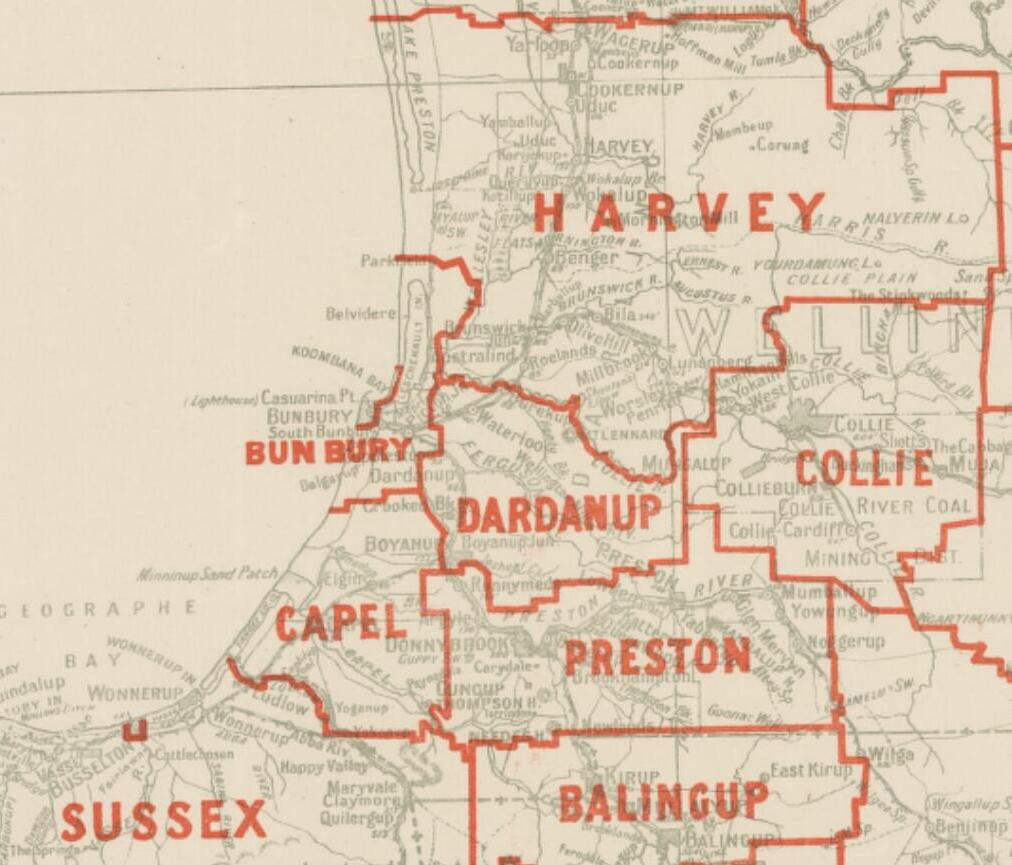
Bunbury and surrounding road districts, 1935

The Bunbury Road District was a local government area in the region surrounding Bunbury, Western Australia from 1899 to 1950.

It was established as the Bunbury Suburban Road District on 26 May 1899, the "suburban" designation distinguishing it from the existing Bunbury Road District (which would be renamed the Capel Road District on 26 June 1907). It was established due to strong protests from residents of Bunbury and the surrounding areas due to the poor state of the roads leading into Bunbury and the perceived disinterest from the Capel-based Bunbury Road Board, with the Bunbury Chamber of Commerce supporting a petition to the government for a new suburban road district. The separation was opposed by the existing Bunbury Road Board, who argued that it would take away a valuable portion of their district.

The first election for the Bunbury Suburban Road Board was held in June 1899, with the first meeting being held on 28 June. The board consisted of seven members elected at large. The road board met in the municipal chambers of the Municipality of Bunbury.

Following the original Bunbury Road District's renaming to Capel, the Bunbury Suburban Road District was renamed the Bunbury Road District on 24 July 1908.

It was effectively abolished on 20 January 1950, with its territory being divided between the Municipality of Bunbury, Capel Road District, Dardanup Road District and Harvey Road District, with a commissioner appointed until the board was formally wound up on 24 March. The abolition met with considerable local opposition, a public campaign for retention and attempts to lobby the Premier and Minister for Local Government, but Premier Ross McLarty was insistent, arguing that several ministers, the previous Labor government and a Royal Commission had considered and supported the decision. The section amalgamated with the Municipality of Bunbury became its new Suburban Ward.

There was some dissatisfaction in the years following the road district's abolition that rates had increased while works that would have been completed under the old system were not being carried out.

Frank Guthrie was a long-serving member and chairman of the road board.
