= John Sibson =

Australian politician

Member of the Legislative Assembly of Western Australia
- In office 7 April 1973 – 19 February 1983
- Preceded by: Maurice Williams
- Succeeded by: Phil Smith
- Constituency: Bunbury

Personal details
- Born: 16 January 1930 Subiaco, Western Australia, Australia
- Died: 11 December 2014 (aged 84) Bunbury, Western Australia, Australia
- Party: Liberal

John Sibson (16 January 1930 – 11 December 2014) was an Australian politician who was a Liberal Party member of the Legislative Assembly of Western Australia from 1973 to 1983, representing the seat of Bunbury.

Sibson was born in Perth, but raised on his parents' farm in Cowaramup, a country town in the South West. After leaving school he worked variously as a milk vendor, a transport contractor, a school-bus driver, and a car salesman. A long-time member of the Liberal Party, Sibson entered parliament at the 1973 Bunbury by-election, which had been caused by the resignation of the sitting Liberal member, Maurice Williams. He held the seat until being defeated by Labor's Phil Smith at the 1983 state election. After being defeated, Sibson was elected to the City of Bunbury council, serving a three-year term. He attempted to re-enter parliament at the 1986 state election, but was unsuccessful, suffering a further swing against him.

Parliament of Western Australia
Preceded by Maurice Williams	Member for Bunbury; 1973–1983	Succeeded by Phil Smith
