= Yvonne Cossart =

Australian Virologist

Yvonne Edna Cossart AO (14 August 1934 – 16 December 2014) was an Australian virologist who discovered the parvovirus B19 in 1975. Parvovirus B19, or Fifth Disease, causes a mild illness in children, as well as aplastic anaemia, hydrops fetalis and acute arthritis.

Cossart graduated from the University of Sydney with a Bachelor of Science in 1957 and MBBS in 1959. She began her career at the Royal Prince Alfred Hospital, before moving to the UK to study clinical pathology at the Royal Postgraduate Medical School. From 1963 to 1966, her work focused on developing techniques to monitor the safety and efficiency of the polio vaccine. During this time she also served on the Medical Research Council Committee for vaccination.

The majority of Cossart's work was on hepatitis, starting in 1967. She was key in testing, survey, and prevention of hepatitis in hospitals and communities.

Cossart returned to Australia in 1977 and took up a position at the University of Sydney. Towards the latter part of her life, Cossart dedicated efforts to developing teaching programs for medical curricula, including focusing on the sociological as well as biological aspect of diseases. She was also involved in university affairs, and supervising post-graduate research students. In 1986, she was appointed as a Bosch Professor of Infectious Diseases and Immunology until she retired in 2006.

She was appointed an Officer of the Order of Australia in the 1998 Queen's Birthday Honours for "service to medicine as a specialist in infectious diseases, especially in the areas of virological research, epidemiology and disease prevention, and to education".

== Personal life ==
Cossart was married to Ted Wills and had a son, Tom.

She died at Greenwich Hospital on 16 December 2014, aged 80.

== Works ==
- Cossart, Yvonne E (1977), Virus hepatitis and its control, Baillière Tindall, ISBN 978-0-7020-0651-7
- Department of Infectious Diseases; Cossart, Yvonne E (1990), History and philosophy of medicine for medical students, Department of Infectious Diseases, University of Sydney
- Cossart, Yvonne E; Pegler, Mollie; University of Sydney. Faculty of Medicine (1993), Doctor! Look behind you : a companion for medical students, History & Philosophy of Medicine Unit, University of Sydney
- Sefton, Ann Jervie; Cossart, Yvonne E; Freckelton, Louise; University of Sydney (2006), 150 years of the Faculty of Medicine, Sydney University Press, ISBN 978-1-920898-35-9
