= Silk Willoughby =

Village and civil parish in the North Kesteven district of Lincolnshire, England

Coordinates: 52.972909°N 0.428206°W

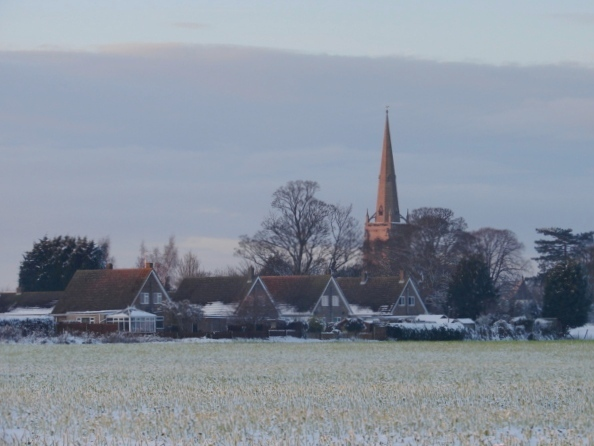
- Silk Willoughby village

- Location within Lincolnshire
- Population: 299 (2011)
- OS grid reference: TF056428
  - London: 105 mi (169 km) S
- District: North Kesteven
- Shire county: Lincolnshire
- Region: East Midlands
- Country: England
- Sovereign state: United Kingdom
- Post town: Sleaford
- Postcode district: NG34
- Police: Lincolnshire
- Fire: Lincolnshire
- Ambulance: East Midlands
- UK Parliament: Grantham and Bourne

Silk Willoughby is a village and civil parish in the North Kesteven district of Lincolnshire, England. The population of the civil parish at the 2011 census was 299. It is situated 2 miles (3 km) south from Sleaford.

There are a number of council and rented properties within the village in addition to owner-occupied housing, both old and new. There are several listed buildings including a Manor House and a former rectory.

The parish of Silk Willoughby comprises approximately 2,500 acres (10 km^{2}) of arable and grazing land. The ecclesiastical parish is part of the benefice of Quarrington and Old Sleaford.

The parish church is dedicated to St Denis. The modern diocesan records use the name "St Denis"' for the church, but the National Monuments Record shows it as "St Denys". St Denis or Denys are alternative spellings for the same person. The nearby church in Sleaford uses the Denys spelling.

Several air accidents have occurred in the parish. On 4 June 1944, a B-24 crashed in a field after being abandoned mid-air and on 7 June 1962, a Hawker Hunter T7 stalled and crashed, killing both crew.

Silk Willoughby won the Best Kept Village award in 2007 and 2013.

== Landmarks ==
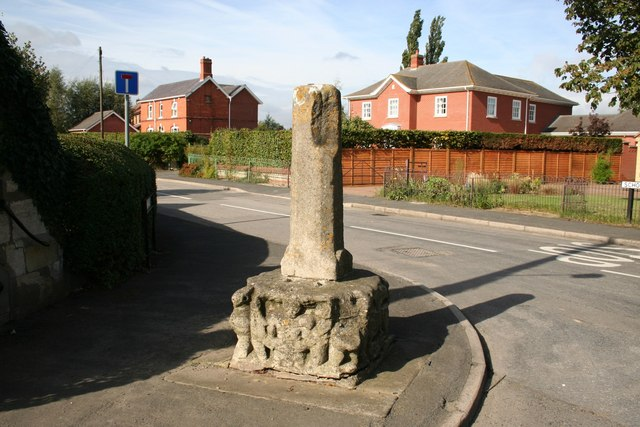
Medieval Cross Shaft

The former village of Silkby lies within the parish.

'Butt Mound' and 'Folk Moot' are names given to two bowl barrows to the west of St Deny's church. Years of agriculture have reduced them somewhat.

The shaft of a medieval wayside cross, dedicated to St Matthew stands on a modern base in what is believed to be the original location, now the corner of School Lane.

The church of St Denis was built in the 12th century in Decorated style, and extended in the 14th in Perpendicular. It was extensively restored in the early 20th century.

== Notable people ==
Griffin Money, who served as a Nationalist Party member of the Legislative Assembly of Western Australia from 1917 to 1924, was born in the village in 1865.
