= Ephraim Clarke =

Australian politician (1846–1921)

The Honourable Ephraim Clarke
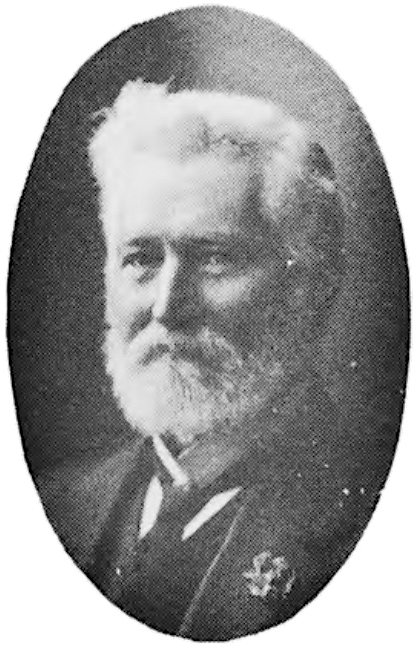

Member of the Legislative Council of Western Australia
- In office 21 August 1901 – 15 April 1921
- Preceded by: William Spencer
- Succeeded by: Francis Willmott
- Constituency: South-West Province

Personal details
- Born: 21 August 1846 Australind, Western Australia, Australia
- Died: 15 April 1921 (aged 74) Bunbury, Western Australia, Australia
- Party: Nationalist
- Spouse: Louisa Frances Teede (m.1876–1921; his death)
- Children: 12

Ephraim Mayo Clarke (21 August 1846 – 15 April 1921) was an Australian politician who was a member of the Legislative Council of Western Australia from 1901 until his death, representing South-West Province. He was a minister in the second government of George Leake.

Clarke was born in Australind, in Western Australia's South West region. He initially worked on his father's property at Australind, but later farmed at his own property, near Harvey. In 1874, Clarke moved to Bunbury, where he was a storekeeper and warehouse owner. He was eventually elected to the Bunbury Municipal Council, and served four periods as Mayor of Bunbury (in 1888, from 1894 to 1897, from 1899 to 1900, and in 1908). Clarke entered parliament at a 1901 Legislative Council by-election, which had been caused by the death of the sitting member, William Spencer (a former mayor of Bunbury). In December 1901, just months after being elected, he was made a minister without portfolio in the Leake ministry. However, George Leake died in June 1902, and Clarke was not retained in the new ministry formed by Walter James. After his initial election, Clarke was re-elected four more times (in 1902, 1908, 1914, and 1920), eventually joining the Nationalist Party. He died in Bunbury in April 1921, aged 74.
