= William Spencer (settler) =

Australian politician

The Honourable William Spencer

Member of the Legislative Council of Western Australia
- In office 27 July 1896 – 23 July 1901 Serving with John Winthrop Hackett and Edward McLarty
- Preceded by: John Foulkes
- Succeeded by: Ephraim Clarke
- Constituency: South-West Province

Personal details
- Born: 1824 Bath, Somerset, England
- Died: 21 July 1901 (aged 76) Bunbury, Western Australia, Australia
- Spouse: Hannah Properjohn (m.1855–1898; her death) Mary Ann Oakley (m.1901; his death)
- Children: 10

William Spencer (1824 – 21 July 1901) was an early settler of Western Australia. Arriving in Bunbury from England in 1842, he remained in the area for the rest of his life, serving several terms as the town's mayor. He was elected to the colony's Legislative Council of Western Australia in 1896, serving until his death.

Spencer was born in Bath, Somerset, England, to Margaret (née Robinson) and Thomas Henry Spencer. His mother was a granddaughter of Mark Robinson, a rear admiral in the Royal Navy. At the age of 17, Spencer stowed away to Australia on the Trusty, arriving in Bunbury in December 1842. On arrival, he was employed as a shepherd, but initially had his wages docked to pay off his passage. Spencer later worked as a police constable, a court clerk, and a tidewaiter (customs officer). He eventually became involved in the construction trade, and as a contractor helped to build the Bunbury Timber Jetty, the Wellington Hotel, and St Paul's Church (which later became the pro-cathedral for the Anglican Diocese of Bunbury).

A long-serving member of the Bunbury Municipal Council, Spencer served as mayor of Bunbury on four occasions, from 1872 to 1875, from 1877 to 1879, in 1881, and from 1891 to 1893. He was also a chairman of the Wellington Road Board. At the 1896 Legislative Council elections, Spencer was elected to South-West Province, replacing the retiring John Foulkes. Aged 71, he became the oldest MP in Western Australia to be elected for the first time. Only two others (James Franklin and John Church) have since been elected for the first time at an older age. Spencer died in Bunbury in July 1901, aged 76. He had married Hannah Properjohn in March 1855, with whom he had ten children. He was widowed in December 1898, and remarried in March 1901, to Mary Ann Oakley (née Cornish). One of his daughters (Clara Robinson Spencer) by his first wife married James Mitchell, a future state premier.
