= Norm Dickson =

Australian rules footballer (1915–2004)

Personal information
- Full name: Norman Mons Dickson
- Born: 8 October 1915
- Died: 25 July 2004 (aged 88)
- Original team: Northcote High School
- Height: 183 cm (6 ft 0 in)
- Weight: 86 kg (190 lb)

Playing career^{1}
Years	Club	Games (Goals)
1936–39	Richmond	28 (25)
1946–47	Northcote (VFA)	13 (15)
- ^{1} Playing statistics correct to the end of 1939.

Norman Mons Dickson OAM (8 October 1915 – 25 July 2004) was an Australian rules footballer who played with Richmond in the Victorian Football League (VFL).

After being unable to play with Richmond in 1940 due to injury, Dickson enlisted in the Australian Army and served for the last four years of World War II.

Upon his return from active service, Dickson resumed his football career, playing with Northcote in the Victorian Football Association.

After his football career, Dickson moved to South Australia and lived in the Adelaide suburb of Brighton. Dickson worked as a sales manager for Esso and managed both the Merino and Grange Golf Clubs, serving as president for three years and club captain for two years at the Grange Golf Club. Dickson and his wife were both awarded the Medal of the Order of Australia (OAM) in June 1998, Norm Dickson's citation reading "for service to the community of Brighton, particularly through the Senior Citizens Club".
