= Frank Guthrie (politician) =

Australian politician (1893–1955)

Member of the Legislative Assembly of Western Australia
- In office 25 March 1950 – 21 September 1955
- Preceded by: James Murray
- Succeeded by: George Roberts
- Constituency: Bunbury

Personal details
- Born: 7 June 1893 Perth, Western Australia, Australia
- Died: 21 September 1955 (aged 62) Bunbury, Western Australia, Australia
- Party: Labor

Frank Guthrie (7 June 1893 – 21 September 1955) was an Australian politician who was a Labor Party member of the Legislative Assembly of Western Australia from 1950 until his death, representing the seat of Bunbury.

Guthrie was born in Perth, to Eliza Ann (née Harvey) and David Guthrie. He enlisted in the Australian Imperial Force in 1915, and during the war served as a private in the 16th and 48th Battalions. He was wounded in action in France in 1917, losing a leg. After the war's end, Guthrie worked as a tally clerk on the Bunbury wharf. He was elected to the Bunbury Road Board in June 1934, and served until its abolition in March 1950, including as chairman for twelve years. Guthrie was elected to parliament at the 1950 state election, reclaiming the seat of Bunbury for the Labor Party from the Liberal Party's James Murray. He was re-elected unopposed at the 1953 election, but died in office in September 1955. The resulting by-election was won by the Liberal candidate, George Roberts.

Parliament of Western Australia
Preceded by James Murray	Member for Bunbury; 1950–1955	Succeeded by George Roberts
