= Ian Osborne (politician) =

Australian politician

Ian Frederick Osborne is a former Australian politician. He was born on 6 May 1951 in Subiaco, Western Australia and was South West Director of Tourism before entering politics. He was educated at Denmark and Albany High Schools, the University of Western Australia (BA and DipEd), Edith Cowan University (PG DipRec) and the University of Iceland (PG Cert Icelandic Language).

== Political Career ==
Osborne was President of the Forrest Division of the Liberal Party and member of the State Executive of the Liberal Party from 1991 to 1993 before being elected to the Western Australian Legislative Assembly as the Liberal member for Bunbury in 1993. He was the Deputy Chairman of Committees from 1996 to 2001 and then Government Whip from 1997 to 1999. He was then the Acting Speaker from 1999 to 2001 before being promoted to the Government front bench as Parliamentary Secretary to the Cabinet from 1999 to 2001. He was defeated at the 2001 State Election. In addition to these Parliamentary and Ministerial appointments, Osborne was a member of the Joint Standing Committee on the Commission on Government from 1994 to 1996, the ranking Liberal on the Public Accounts and Expenditure Review Committee from 1997 to 2000, a member of the Select Committee on Road Safety from 1993 to 1996; and a member of the Select Committee into Ancient Shipwrecks from 1993 to 1995.

== After Politics ==
After leaving Parliament, Osborne was the inaugural CEO of Denmark Tourism Inc, Chairman of the Denmark Music Foundation, a Denmark Shire Councillor from 2012 to 2022, and Chairman of the Wine Show of Western Australia from 2020 to 2024. He is Managing Director of the Shadforth Truffle Company, founded on the farm settled in 1922 by his Grandparents.

Western Australian Legislative Assembly
Preceded by Phil Smith	Member for Bunbury; 1993–2001	Succeeded by Tony Dean
