= William Lemen Thomas =

Australian politician

William Thomas
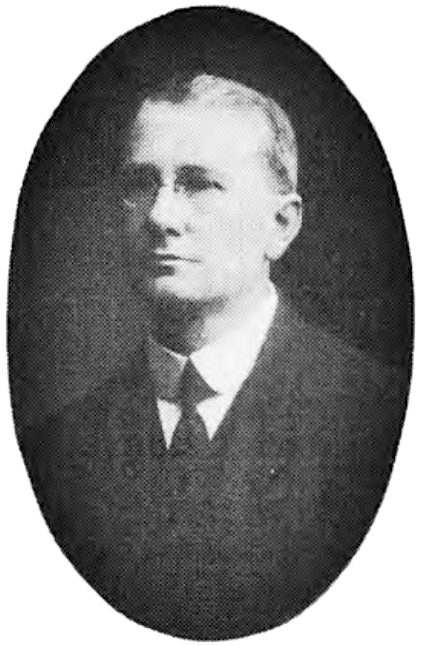

Member of the Legislative Assembly of Western Australia
- In office 1 March 1911 – 29 September 1917
- Preceded by: Sir Newton Moore
- Succeeded by: Griffin Money
- Constituency: Bunbury

Personal details
- Born: 25 September 1872 Kilmore, Victoria, Australia
- Died: 13 July 1921 (aged 48) Bunbury, Western Australia, Australia
- Party: Labor (to 1916); National Labor (from 1916)

William Lemen Thomas (25 September 1872 – 13 July 1921) was an Australian politician who was a member of the Legislative Assembly of Western Australia from 1911 to 1917, representing the seat of Bunbury. He was a minister in the government of Henry Lefroy.

== Early life ==
Thomas was born in Kilmore, Victoria, to Mary (née Browne) and James Thomas. He trained as a chemist in New South Wales, becoming a member of the state's Pharmaceutical Society. In 1893, Thomas moved to Kalgoorlie, Western Australia, where he initially worked in the hospital dispensary and later had his own pharmacy. He moved to Perth in 1901, and eventually to Bunbury, where he was elected to the Bunbury Municipal Council in 1906.

== Politics ==
Thomas first stood for parliament at the 1908 state election, as the Labor Party's candidate for the seat of Sussex, but was defeated by Frank Wilson (a future premier). At the 1910 Legislative Council elections, he stood for South-West Province, but lost to Edward McLarty. Thomas eventually entered parliament at the 1911 Bunbury by-election, which had been caused by the resignation of Sir Newton Moore (a former premier).

Thomas was re-elected at the 1911 and 1914 state elections. Following the 1916 Labor Party split, he transferred to the new National Labor Party. In June 1917, Thomas was made a minister without portfolio in the new ministry formed by Henry Lefroy, who had replaced Frank Wilson as premier. However, at the 1917 state election, he was defeated in Bunbury by the Nationalist Party's Griffin Money.

== Later life ==
After leaving parliament, Thomas returned to local government, being elected Mayor of Bunbury in 1918. He collapsed at a council meeting in July 1921, and died a few days later. He had married Hannah Walker in 1901, with whom he had one son.

Parliament of Western Australia
Preceded by Sir Newton Moore	Member for Bunbury; 1911–1917	Succeeded by Griffin Money
