= David Tiller (professor) =

Australian professor of medicine

David Tiller AO
- Education: University of Sydney, MBBS 1964
- Known for: Longest serving Head of Department of Renal Medicine at Royal Prince Alfred Hospital (1973-1997) and President of the Royal Australasian College of Physicians from 1994 to 1996

David J. Tiller AO is an Australian Professor of Medicine and past President of the Royal Australasian College of Physicians (1994-1996).

== Education ==
Tiller attended All Saint's College in NSW before attending the University of Sydney. Tiller graduated for the University of Sydney in 1964 with a Bachelor of Medicine, Bachelor of Surgery (MBBS) after previously studying Pharmacy, and was made a fellow of the Royal Australian College of Physicians (FRACP) in 1967.

== Career ==
Tiller trained as a nephrologist. He worked as a medical officer (1964-1968), Staff Physician (1974-1984), and was appointed Head of Department of Renal medicine at the Royal Prince Alfred Hospital in 1973 where he served until 1997. In 2002 he was appointed Emeritus Consultant in Renal medicine.

Tiller has served in a number of boards and committees throughout his career in extension to his clinical work. Professor Tiller was Chair of the Medical Board of NSW's Area of Need Review Committee from 2000-2003. From 2000-2005, Professor Tiller served on the Federal Government's Private Health Industry Medical Devices Expert Committee He was Chair of the Kidney Care Australia Taskforce from 2001-2006.

Tiller has held a variety of positions within the Royal Australasian College of Physicians (RACP). Notably, he has held of offices of President (1994-1996), Vice President (1992-1994), Chairman of the Constitutional Committee (1991-1993), councillor (1990-1993), Honorary Secretary (1985-1900) and censor (1980-1984).

After ceasing clinical work, Tiller served in many positions at the University of Sydney. He was made the inaugural Associate Dean of the School of Rural Health (1995-2002), and later Associate Dean (Planning and Development) of the Sydney Medical School.

Tiller is also a member of the International Society of Hypertension, the International Society of Nephrology and the International Society of Transplantation.

Tiller currently serves as Visiting Professor of Medicine, School of Rural Health, Sydney Medical School, and has done so since 2008.

== Recognition ==
Tiller was appointed an Officer of the Order of Australia (AO) in the general division in the 1998 Queen's Birthday Honour Roll. His citation reads "For service to medicine, to medical education and to medical research, particularly in the field of kidney disease and hypertension."

Tiller was made an honorary Fellow of the Royal College of Physicians in Thailand in 1996.
