= Tony Dean (Australian politician) =

Australian politician

Anthony James Dean (born 19 January 1954) is a former Australian politician.

Born in Nannup, Western Australia, Dean received a Bachelor of Science (Agriculture) and a Diploma of Education, becoming a schoolteacher. He was elected to the Western Australian Legislative Assembly in 2001 as the Labor member for Bunbury, defeating sitting member Ian Osborne. He was himself defeated in 2005 by John Castrilli. Dean has continued his political career and currently holds the position of shire president for the Shire of Nannup.

Parliament of Western Australia
Preceded by Ian Osborne	Member for Bunbury; 2001–2005	Succeeded by John Castrilli
