= George Roberts (Western Australian politician) =

Australian politician

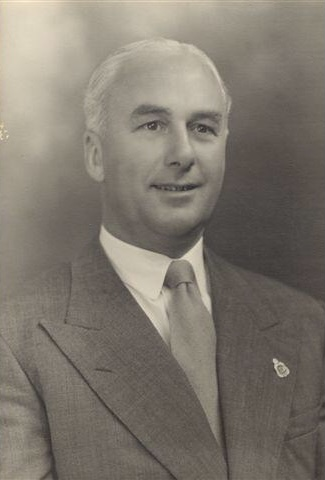

Member of the Legislative Assembly of Western Australia
- In office 29 October 1955 – 22 July 1962
- Preceded by: Frank Guthrie
- Succeeded by: Maurice Williams
- Constituency: Bunbury

Personal details
- Born: 2 February 1913 Bunbury, Western Australia, Australia
- Died: 22 July 1962 (aged 49) Perth, Western Australia, Australia
- Party: Liberal

George Frederick Roberts (2 February 1913 – 22 July 1962) was an Australian politician who was a Liberal Party member of the Legislative Assembly of Western Australia from 1955 until his death, representing the seat of Bunbury.

Roberts was born in Bunbury, and attended Bunbury High School. After leaving school, he worked as a livestock auctioneer. He enlisted in the Australian Army in November 1939, and served as a lieutenant with the 2/11th and 2/33rd Battalions in Europe. After being discharged in 1941, Roberts returned to Bunbury, where he became the managing director of a local department store, Thomas Hayward & Son. A founding member of the Liberal Party, he was elected to parliament at the 1955 Bunbury by-election, caused by the death of the sitting Labor member, Frank Guthrie. He was re-elected three times (in 1955, 1959 and 1962), but, like his predecessor, died in office. Roberts was elected as Chairman of Committees in Legislative Assembly in July 1959. George Roberts had married Dorothy Harriet Christey in 1951, with whom he had three children, Kim, Helen and Ian Roberts.

Parliament of Western Australia
Preceded by Frank Guthrie	Member for Bunbury; 1955–1962	Succeeded by Maurice Williams
