= Antony Burgess =

Australian biochemist and a cancer researcher

Antony Wilks Burgess AC, FAA (born 1946) is an Australian biochemist and a cancer researcher. He has been Director of the Ludwig Institute for Cancer Research in Melbourne and Professor of Surgery at the Royal Melbourne Hospital, University of Melbourne since 1980. He was elected a Fellow of the Australian Academy of Science (FAA) in 1993. In 1998, he was appointed a Companion of the Order of Australia (AC) "for outstanding services to science and medicine, especially in the field of cancer research".

== Publications ==
- Burgess, Antony W. (1989), "The Origins of Growth Factors: Tethelin Lost", Trends in Biochemical Sciences, Vol.14, No.3 (March 1989): pp.117–120. doi:10.1016/0968-0004(89)90135-7
