= Maurice Williams (politician) =

Australian politician

Member of the Legislative Assembly of Western Australia
- In office 1 September 1962 – 28 February 1973
- Preceded by: George Roberts
- Succeeded by: John Sibson
- Constituency: Bunbury

Personal details
- Born: 26 June 1926 Subiaco, Western Australia, Australia
- Died: 3 July 2004 (aged 78) Fremantle, Western Australia, Australia
- Party: Liberal

Maurice Clifford Williams (26 June 1926 – 3 July 2004) was an Australian politician who was a Liberal Party member of the Legislative Assembly of Western Australia from 1962 to 1973, representing the seat of Bunbury.

Williams was born in Perth, but educated primarily in country Western Australia, attending Eastern Goldfields High School. He went on to study metal moulding at Perth Technical College, and eventually started a foundry in Bunbury. Williams entered parliament at the 1962 Bunbury by-election, which had been caused by the death of the sitting Liberal member, George Roberts. He was appointed deputy chairman of committees after the 1968 state election, and served until he resigned from parliament in February 1973. Williams attempted to re-enter parliament at the 1977 state election, contesting the seat of Collie, but was easily defeated by the sitting Labor member, Tom Jones. After leaving politics, he retired to a property at Burekup. He remained involved in community affairs, however, helping to organise the celebrations for Bunbury's proclamation as a city in 1979, and later serving as the executive officer of Bunbury's visitor centre. Williams died in Fremantle in July 2004, aged 78. He had married Betty Dick in 1952, with whom he had three sons.

Parliament of Western Australia
Preceded by George Roberts	Member for Bunbury; 1962–1973	Succeeded by John Sibson
