= Frederick Withers (politician) =

Australian politician

Member of the Legislative Assembly of Western Australia
- In office 22 April 1924 – 15 March 1947
- Preceded by: Griffin Money
- Succeeded by: James Murray
- Constituency: Bunbury

Personal details
- Born: 11 April 1881 Bunbury, Western Australia, Australia
- Died: 20 May 1963 (aged 82) Bunbury, Western Australia, Australia
- Party: Labor

Frederick James Withers (11 April 1881 – 20 May 1963) was an Australian politician who was a Labor Party member of the Legislative Assembly of Western Australia from 1924 to 1947, representing the seat of Bunbury. He was later mayor of the City of Bunbury from 1951 to 1955.

Withers was born in Bunbury to Esther (née Blythe) and Edward Henry Withers. After leaving school, he worked with Western Australian Government Railways, as a fireman and later as an engine driver. An official of the Engine Drivers' Union and a long-time member of the Labor Party, Withers was elected to parliament at the 1924 state election, defeating the sitting Nationalist member, Griffin Money. After Labor's victory at the 1933 election, he was appointed deputy chairman of committees in the government of Philip Collier, a position which he retained until his retirement at the 1947 election. In 1950, Withers attempted to return to parliament through the Legislative Council, but was defeated by the sitting Liberal member, Les Craig. (Note: Craig had earlier been Withers's Nationalist opponent for the seat of Bunbury at the 1927 election.) He was elected mayor of Bunbury the following year, and served until 1955. Withers died in Bunbury in 1963, aged 82. The Bunbury suburb of Withers is named after him. His son, Reg Withers, was a senator and Lord Mayor of Perth.

== Notes ==
Parliament of Western Australia
Preceded by Griffin Money	Member for Bunbury; 1924–1947	Succeeded by James Murray
