= Wallace King (businessman) =

Wallace Macarthur King AO was the chief executive officer of Leighton Holdings, Australia's largest engineering and construction company. He was CEO from 1987 until he was replaced on 1 February 2011 by David Stewart, making him one of the longest-running CEOs in Australian history.

Wallace King is an alumnus of the University of New South Wales, graduating with both a Bachelor of Engineering and a Master of Engineering Science. The university recognised his accomplishments by conferring on him the degree of Doctor of Science (honoris causa).

He joined Leighton Contractors in 1968 and became managing director of that company in 1977. He was appointed as deputy managing director of Leighton Holdings in 1983, and promoted to CEO in 1987.

King was appointed Member of the Order of Australia in 1998 for "service to the construction industry, to the Australian Constructors Association and to the community" and in 2001 awarded the Centenary Medal for "service to Australian society in civil, structural and mining engineering". He was promoted to Officer of the Order of Australia in the 2004 Queen's Birthday Honours for "service to the Australian construction industry as a leader and innovator and through initiatives to develop the export of engineering services, particularly in the Asian region, and to the community through support for a range of educational, environmental, welfare and cultural organisations".

== Corporate & other positions ==
Wallace King has been a director of Coca-Cola Amatil since 2002. He is also a member of the University Council of the University of New South Wales.
