= Electoral district of Bunbury =

State electoral district of Western Australia

Bunbury Western Australia—Legislative Assembly
- Interactive map of district boundaries
- State: Western Australia
- Dates current: 1890–present
- MP: Don Punch
- Party: Labor
- Namesake: Bunbury
- Electors: 32,845 (2025)
- Area: 110 km^{2} (42.5 sq mi)
- Demographic: Provincial
- Coordinates: 33.36°S 115.66°E
Electorates around Bunbury:
Indian Ocean	Indian Ocean	Murray-Wellington
Indian Ocean	Bunbury	Collie-Preston
Vasse	Collie-Preston	Collie-Preston

Bunbury is an electoral district of the Legislative Assembly in the Australian state of Western Australia.

The district, taking in the local government areas of the City of Bunbury and part of the Shire of Capel including Dalyellup, has existed continuously since 1890, being one of the original 30 seats contested at the 1890 general election. Since 1959, the seat has been held by the party of government for all but two terms, making it an effective bellwether. Two early Premiers of Western Australia, Sir John Forrest and Sir Newton Moore, held Bunbury during their time in office. However, after Moore's retirement in 1911, another member for Bunbury was not appointed to a cabinet post until 2008, when John Castrilli became Minister for Local Government under Colin Barnett.

== Members for Bunbury ==
Member	Party	Term
Sir John Forrest	Ministerial	1890–1901
Thomas Hayward	Ministerial	1901–1904
Sir Newton Moore	Ministerial	1904–1911
William Thomas	Labor	1911–1917
William Thomas	National Labor	1917
Griffin Money	Nationalist	1917–1924
Frederick Withers	Labor	1924–1947
James Murray	Liberal	1947–1949
James Murray	LCL	1949–1950
Frank Guthrie	Labor	1950–1955
George Roberts	LCL	1955–1962
Maurice Williams	LCL	1962–1968
Maurice Williams	Liberal	1968–1973
John Sibson	Liberal	1973–1983
Phil Smith	Labor	1983–1993
Ian Osborne	Liberal	1993–2001
Tony Dean	Labor	2001–2005
John Castrilli	Liberal	2005–2017
Don Punch	Labor	2017–present

== Election results ==
2025 Western Australian state election: Bunbury
Party	Candidate	Votes	%	±%
Labor	Don Punch	10,669	40.9	−19.6
Liberal	Heather Reid	7,223	27.7	+8.8
Greens	Patricia Perks	2,530	9.7	+4.9
Legalise Cannabis	John Bell	1,631	6.2	+3.9
One Nation	Shane Myles	1,556	6.0	+3.3
National	Codee-Lee Down	1,425	5.5	+1.0
Christians	Boyd Davey	721	2.8	+2.8
Shooters, Fishers, Farmers	Cameron Van Veen	351	1.3	−1.2
Total formal votes		26,106	94.8	−0.6
Informal votes		1,425	5.2	+0.6
Turnout		27,531	83.8	+3.4
Two-party-preferred result
Labor	Don Punch	14,901	57.1	−15.4
Liberal	Heather Reid	11,178	42.9	+15.4
Labor hold		Swing	−15.4	
