= Griffin Money =

Australian politician

Member of the Legislative Assembly of Western Australia
- In office 29 September 1917 – 22 March 1924
- Preceded by: William Thomas
- Succeeded by: Frederick Withers
- Constituency: Bunbury

Personal details
- Born: 17 June 1865 Silk Willoughby, Lincolnshire, England
- Died: 1 September 1958 (aged 93) Bunbury, Western Australia, Australia
- Party: Nationalist

Griffin Cant Money (17 June 1865 – 1 September 1958) was an Australian politician who was a Nationalist Party member of the Legislative Assembly of Western Australia from 1917 to 1924, representing the seat of Bunbury.

Money was born in Silk Willoughby, Lincolnshire, England, and trained as a solicitor. He moved to Australia in 1898, and initially settled in Perth, where he practised law. In 1910, Money purchased a property of 12,000-acre (49 km^{2}) at Burekup, in the state's South West region. He later acquired farms at Dinninup and Waterloo. Money first attempted to enter politics at the 1914 state election, but lost to the sitting Labor member for Bunbury, William Thomas. He reversed the result at the 1917 election, and held the seat until being defeated by Labor's Frederick Withers at the 1924 election. After leaving politics, Money returned to his Burekup property. He died in Bunbury in 1958, aged 93.

Parliament of Western Australia
Preceded by William Thomas	Member for Bunbury; 1917–1924	Succeeded by Frederick Withers
