= Don Punch =

Australian politician

Don Punch MLA
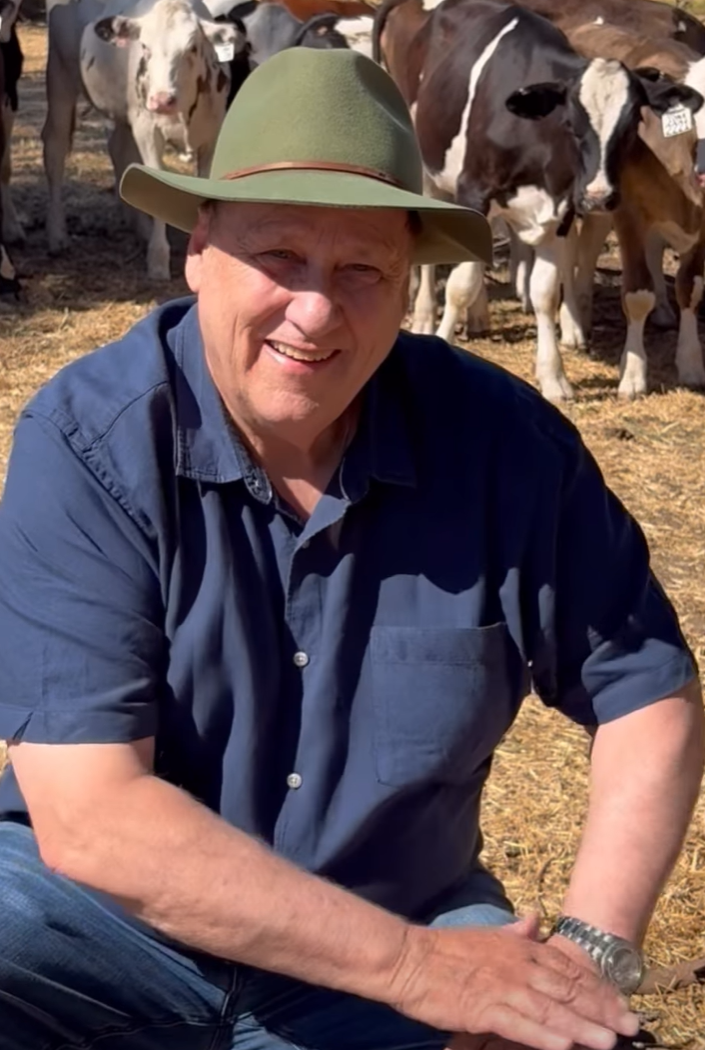

Minister for Disability Services
- In office 18 March 2021 – 19 March 2025
- Premier: Mark McGowan
- Preceded by: Stephen Dawson
- Succeeded by: Hannah Beazley

Minister for Fisheries
- In office 18 March 2021 – 19 March 2025
- Premier: Mark McGowan
- Preceded by: Peter Tinley
- Succeeded by: Hannah Beazley

Minister for Innovation and ICT
- In office 18 March 2021 – 21 December 2021
- Premier: Mark McGowan
- Preceded by: Dave Kelly

Minister for Seniors and Ageing
- In office 18 March 2021 – 19 March 2025
- Premier: Mark McGowan
- Preceded by: Mick Murray

Member of the Western Australian Legislative Assembly for Bunbury
- Incumbent
- Assumed office 11 March 2017
- Preceded by: John Castrilli

Personal details
- Born: 31 August 1956 (age 70) Pwllheli, Wales
- Party: Labor
- Website: www.donpunch.com.au

Donald Thomas Punch (born 31 August 1956) is an Australian politician. He has been a Labor member of the Western Australian Legislative Assembly since the 2017 state election, representing Bunbury.

Punch studied psychology and social work at the University of Western Australia later completing an MBA at Edith Cowan University. He also holds a Master Class 5 and is a Private Pilot. He has worked throughout regional Western Australia as a social worker and later as a Senior Executive in the public sector. He became CEO of the South West Development Commission in 1998, serving until he resigned in 2016 upon his preselection as the Labor candidate for Bunbury. In his role as the CEO, Punch was responsible for many aspects of The South West's development including projects such as the renewal of the town centre of Manjimup with an emphasis on food based tourism, redevelopment of Busselton airport and renewal of the water front in Bunbury.

Punch was appointed to the WA Methamphetamine Task Force in 2017.

Punch was re-elected in the 2025 Western Australian state election.

As of 3 August 2026, Punch is the Minister for Aboriginal Affairs, Racing and Gaming, and the Southwest.

== Personal details ==
Punch was born in 1956 in Pwllhelli, Wales. He migrated to Australia in 1971 from Manchester in the UK and attended high school in Manjimup and Collie. His early life in Manchester was turbulent following the separation of his mother and father. He migrated to Australia at the age of 14 and joined his brother Tony and his wife Ann and recommenced high school in Manjimup. He matriculated from Collie High School in 1973 and attributes this to a combination of inspiring teachers and the regional school experience.

He studied psychology at UWA and then spent 1978 working back in Manchester. In 1979 he returned to Australia to study social work at UWA, where he met his first wife, Beverley. They had two sons. He worked as a social worker in Moora, later transferring to Collie. In 1986 Beverley died following complications from a heart surgery, and this had a devastating impact on him, which formulated much of his later thinking about grief, loss and human relationships.

Punch later became the regional director for the Department for Family and Children's Services northern regions and married Helen Wychlo, the daughter of Polish immigrants and an accomplished harpist.

In 1998 Punch left Family and Children's Services to take on the role of CEO of the South West Development Commission. He completed his MBA in 2003.

Punch is a sailor and holds commercial marine qualifications both as a master of commercial vessels (Master Class 5) and as a Yachtmaster Instructor and recreational diver. He also holds a private pilot's license. In his spare time he enjoys restoring English cars of the 1960s and 1970s.

Western Australian Legislative Assembly
Preceded by John Castrilli	Member for Bunbury; 2017–present	Incumbent
