= Judy Henderson =

Climate activist & legal change maker (born 1945)

- Born: Judy Isabel Henderson; 1945 (age 80–81)
- Education: Sydney University
- Employer: Oxfam

Judy Henderson AO (born 1945) is an Australian natural resource manager, environmentalist and paediatrician who was awarded an Order of Australia in 1988 for service to "developing countries, particularly as chairman of community Aid Abroad and Oxfam International, and to the community through the promotion of environmental issues".

== Early life ==
Henderson grew up near Bellingen, NSW, on a dairy farm. Her father died when she was aged eight, yet she had extended family. Henderson attended high school at Coffs Harbour High School, between 1957 and 1961, and studied medicine at Sydney University.

Henderson spent much time exploring the natural environment. She spent much time throughout her career working with disadvantaged communities, including with indigenous Australians as well as in Nepal. She was a volunteer at the Redfern Aboriginal Medical Centre, and also worked with Aboriginal youth and children while training as a paediatrician within Perth, Australia. Henderson worked in Nepal, for three months in a hospital in Tansen, and then in Toronto, Canada, at the Hospital for Sick Children. She then returned to Nepal after one year in Canada, where she worked for the United Mission to Nepal at the Shanta Bhawan Hospital, Kathmandu, as a Paediatrician. She lived and worked in Nepal for 10 years, and for the last 4 years was posted to the Karnali Technical School in Jumla where she developed a training program for medical and health workers within remote areas of Nepal.

== Career ==
Henderson moved to Tasmania in 1985 and joined the environmental and conservation communities within Tasmania. She was the Chair of Community Aid Abroad (which became Oxfam) and later was the inaugural Chair of Oxfam International. She assisted in the establishment of the Australian Bush Heritage Fund, where both she and Bob Brown became founding Directors.

Henderson was an NGO adviser at the Rio Earth Summit, in 1992, for the Australian Delegation. She was chair of Oxfam International, the Global Reporting Initiative, and Australian Ethical Investments, a Commissioner on the World Commission on Dams. Henderson was also on the board of Greenpeace International, the Australian Landcare Council and the NSW Environment Protection Authority.

Between 2004 and 2011, Henderson was the Chair of the Northern Rivers Catchment Management Authority.

Henderson was a candidate for the Tasmanian senate, as part of the conservation movement.

== Recognition and awards ==
• 1998 – Order of Australia
