= June Nixon =

Australian organist and choir master (born 1942)

- Born: Helena June Rose Nixon; 1942 (age 83–84); Australia
- Education: Diploma in Music (Piano), University of Melbourne; Bachelor of Music (Organ), University of Melbourne; Fellowship of the Royal College of Organists (FRCO)
- Occupations: Organist; pianist; choral conductor; lecturer; composer
- Works: The Holly and the Ivy (choral arrangement)
- Years active: 1968–present
- Awards: Percy Jones Award (1995); Member of the Order of Australia (AM) (1998); Lambeth Degree, Doctor of Music (Cantuar) (1999); Fellowship of the Royal School of Church Music (FRSCM) (2024)
- Website: www.junenixon.com

Helena June Rose Nixon (born 1942) is an Australian organist, pianist, choral conductor, lecturer and composer. She is known for her published choral arrangements, including her setting of "The Holly and the Ivy", performed by Australian collegiate choirs.

== Biography ==
=== Early life and education ===
Nixon began her musical training at an early age, before studying at the University of Melbourne and earning a Diploma in Music (Piano) and Bachelor of Music (Organ). Post graduate scholarships enabled further study abroad, where she gained fellowship of the Royal College of Organists (FRCO) and became the first woman to receive the John Brooke prize for the Choirtraining Diploma.

=== Career ===
Nixon won the 1968 Australian National Organ Competition. In 1973, she was appointed Organist and Director of Music at St. Paul's Cathedral in Melbourne, a position she held for 40 years until her retirement in 2013. On retirement, she was appointed Organist Emerita.

She was a consultant for the restoration of the T.C. Lewis organ in St. Paul’s Cathedral, and was a member of the steering committee for the restoration of the Hill organ in the Melbourne Town Hall.

=== Awards ===
Nixon has been recognised worldwide for her contributions to church music in Australia and among several awards are:

- 1995 – Percy Jones Award for "Outstanding dedication and service given to music for worship" from the Catholic Archdiocese of Melbourne
- 1998 – Member of the Order of Australia (AM) in the General Division in the Queen's Birthday Honours.
- 1999 – The Lambeth Degree, Doctor of Music (Cantuar) conferred on her by the Archbishop of Canterbury.
- 2024 – Fellowship of the Royal School of Church Music (FRSCM)

=== Recordings ===
Nixon has recorded several albums of organ and choral music. Some of her notable recordings include "Great Music for Great Occasions," "Elgar Organ Sonatas," "Jubilaum," (organ music of Ronald Watson), "A tribute to Herbert Sumsion," and "Christmas Eve at St. Paul’s Cathedral."
