= Phil Smith (Australian politician) =

Australian politician

Philip "Phil" John Smith (born 24 October 1938) is a former Australian politician and teacher.

Born in West Perth, Phil graduated from Claremont Teacher's College in 1957 before completing a Bachelor of Education at University of Western Australia in 1963 (as well as being awarded a Full Blue for Athletics). He was a teacher in Margaret River, Derby and Newton Moore SHS in Bunbury prior to being elected to the Western Australian Legislative Assembly in 1983 as the Labor member for Bunbury. He was instrumental in the Bunbury 2000 development plan and served as the Deputy Government Whip from 1990-1993. He was defeated in 1993 and succeeded by Ian Osborne.

Following his defeat he returned to teaching as an educator in Physical Education as well as the Education Officer for the Astronomical Society of the South West (Inc.). He was a Founding member and Chairman of the Bunbury Timber Jetty Environmental and Conservation Society seeking to preserve the historic Bunbury Timber Jetty. He was awarded Bunbury Citizen of the Year for 1998.
