= John Castrilli =

Australian politician

The Honourable John Castrilli OAM

Minister for Local Government; Heritage; Citizenship and Multicultural Interests
- In office 23 September 2008 – 11 March 2017
- Premier: Colin Barnett

Member of the Western Australian Parliament for Bunbury
- In office 26 February 2005 – 30 January 2017
- Preceded by: Tony Dean
- Succeeded by: Don Punch

Mayor of Bunbury
- In office 1997–2005
- Succeeded by: David Smith

Personal details
- Born: Giovanni Mario Castrilli; 22 November 1950 (age 75) Roccamandolfi, Italy
- Citizenship: Australian
- Party: Liberal Party
- Spouse: Loretta
- Profession: Accountant
- Website: johncastrilli.com.au

Giovanni Mario "John" Castrilli OAM (Italian: [dʒoˈvanni ˈmaːrjo kaˈstrilli]; born 22 November 1950), is a former Liberal member of the Western Australian Legislative Assembly representing the electorate of Bunbury after winning the seat in the 2005 election. He retired in 2017.

== Early life ==
Castrilli's father, Antonio, arrived in Australia in 1952 after migrating from Roccamandolfi in Italy, he was joined by the rest of his family in 1954.

== Political career ==
Starting his career in local politics in 1991, Castrilli served as a councillor of the City of Bunbury from 1991 to 1997. Castrilli was then elected as Mayor of Bunbury in 1997 and re-elected in 2001 with a two-party vote of 73.5%.

Contesting the seat of Bunbury for the first time in the 2005 election Castrilli beat the sitting Labor member with a swing of +0.6 points and winning the seat by 0.4 points.

He immediately became a shadow minister under leader Matt Birney, serving in the Local Government and Regional Development shadow portfolio from March 2005 to May 2005.

After the defeat of the Labor government at the 2008 election, he was appointed to the Barnett Ministry and became Minister for Local Government, in which role he handled a controversial proposition to amalgamate smaller local councils.

Western Australian Legislative Assembly
Preceded by Tony Dean	Member for Bunbury; 2005–2017	Succeeded by Don Punch
