= Electoral results for the district of Canning =

Western Australian district election results

This is a list of electoral results for the Electoral district of Canning in Western Australian state elections.

== Members for Canning ==
Canning (1897–1901)
Member	Party	Term
Frank Wilson	Oppositionist	1897–1901
Canning (1904–1989)
William Gordon	Ministerial	1904–1911
Charles Lewis	Labor	1911–1914
Robert Robinson	Liberal	1914–1917
Robert Robinson	Nationalist	1917–1921
Alec Clydesdale	Labor	1921–1930
Herbert Wells	Nationalist	1930–1933
Charles Cross	Labor	1933–1947
George Yates	Liberal	1947–1949
George Yates	LCL	1949–1950
Arthur Griffith	LCL	1950–1953
Colin Jamieson	Labor	1953–1956
William Gaffy	Labor	1956–1959
Des O'Neil	LCL	1959–1962
Don May	Labor	1962–1965
Ross Elliott	LCL	1965–1968
Tom Bateman	Labor	1968–1986
Judyth Watson	Labor	1986–1989

== Election results ==
=== Elections in the 1980s ===
1986 Western Australian state election: Canning
Party	Candidate	Votes	%	±%
Labor	Judyth Watson	11,365	65.8	+0.2
Liberal	Elkin Conway	5,918	34.2	−0.2
Total formal votes		17,283	3.2	0.0
Informal votes		575	3.2	0.0
Turnout		17,858	91.5	+4.0
Labor hold		Swing	+0.2	

1983 Western Australian state election: Canning
Party	Candidate	Votes	%	±%
Labor	Tom Bateman	9,512	65.6	
Liberal	John Nagle	4,980	34.4	
Total formal votes		14,492	96.8	
Informal votes		480	3.2	
Turnout		14,972	87.5	
Labor hold		Swing		

1980 Western Australian state election: Canning
Party	Candidate	Votes	%	±%
Labor	Tom Bateman	10,025	58.5	+5.4
Liberal	Jack Courtis	7,109	41.5	−5.4
Total formal votes		17,134	96.2	−0.3
Informal votes		675	3.8	+0.3
Turnout		17,809	88.3	−1.9
Labor hold		Swing	+5.4	

=== Elections in the 1970s ===
1977 Western Australian state election: Canning
Party	Candidate	Votes	%	±%
Labor	Tom Bateman	7,686	53.1	
Liberal	Richard Shellabear	6,800	46.9	
Total formal votes		14,486	96.5	
Informal votes		524	3.5	
Turnout		15,010	90.2	
Labor hold		Swing	−4.5	

1974 Western Australian state election: Canning
Party	Candidate	Votes	%	±%
Labor	Tom Bateman	10,283	54.6	
Liberal	John Sinclair	7,145	37.9	
National Alliance	Paul Clune	1,010	5.4	
Australia	Robert Russell-Brown	394	2.1	
Total formal votes		18,832	96.3	
Informal votes		725	3.7	
Turnout		19,557	91.5	
Two-party-preferred result
Labor	Tom Bateman	10,582	56.2	
Liberal	John Sinclair	8,250	43.8	
Labor hold		Swing		

1971 Western Australian state election: Canning
Party	Candidate	Votes	%	±%
Labor	Tom Bateman	10,602	55.4	+6.9
Liberal	Neil Charles	6,800	35.6	−8.9
Democratic Labor	Bill Wallace	1,228	6.4	+2.5
Independent	Victor Hawtin	494	2.6	+2.6
Total formal votes		19,124	96.8	+0.5
Informal votes		621	3.2	−0.5
Turnout		19,745	92.5	−0.3
Two-party-preferred result
Labor	Tom Bateman	11,206	58.6	+8.1
Liberal	Neil Charles	7,918	41.4	−8.1
Labor hold		Swing	+8.1	

=== Elections in the 1960s ===
1968 Western Australian state election: Canning
Party	Candidate	Votes	%	±%
Labor	Tom Bateman	6,185	48.5	
Liberal and Country	Ross Elliott	5,683	44.5	
Democratic Labor	Lydia Obbes	498	3.9	
Independent	Melford Roe	397	3.1	
Total formal votes		12,763	96.3	
Informal votes		485	3.7	
Turnout		13,248	92.8	
Two-party-preferred result
Labor	Tom Bateman	6,441	50.5	
Liberal and Country	Ross Elliott	6,322	49.5	
Labor gain from Liberal and Country		Swing		

1965 Western Australian state election: Canning
Party	Candidate	Votes	%	±%
Labor	Don May	4,972	48.3	+0.9
Liberal and Country	Ross Elliott	4,890	47.5	+8.4
Democratic Labor	Louis Raven	434	4.2	+4.2
Total formal votes		10,296	96.9	−1.5
Informal votes		325	3.1	+1.5
Turnout		10,621	92.9	−1.5
Two-party-preferred result
Liberal and Country	Ross Elliott	5,221	50.7	+1.9
Labor	Don May	5,075	49.3	−1.9
Liberal and Country gain from Labor		Swing	+1.9	

1962 Western Australian state election: Canning
Party	Candidate	Votes	%	±%
Labor	Donald May	4,206	47.4	
Liberal and Country	Raymond Richardson	3,472	39.1	
Country	Arthur Mills	1,193	13.5	
Total formal votes		8,871	98.4	
Informal votes		146	1.6	
Turnout		9,017	94.4	
Two-party-preferred result
Labor	Donald May	4,527	51.0	
Liberal and Country	Raymond Richardson	4,344	49.0	
Labor gain from Liberal and Country		Swing		

=== Elections in the 1950s ===
1959 Western Australian state election: Canning
Party	Candidate	Votes	%	±%
Liberal and Country	Des O'Neil	6,514	51.0	+2.1
Labor	Bill Gaffy	5,161	40.4	−10.7
Democratic Labor	Michael O'Brien	1,087	8.5	+8.5
Total formal votes		12,762	98.6	+0.2
Informal votes		178	1.4	−0.2
Turnout		12,940	93.4	−0.4
Two-party-preferred result
Liberal and Country	Des O'Neil		58.2	+9.3
Labor	Bill Gaffy		41.8	−9.3
Liberal and Country gain from Labor		Swing	+9.3	

- Two party preferred vote was estimated.

1956 Western Australian state election: Canning
Party	Candidate	Votes	%	±%
Labor	Bill Gaffy	4,825	51.1	
Liberal and Country	Richard Marris	4,615	48.9	
Total formal votes		9,440	98.4	
Informal votes		157	1.6	
Turnout		9,597	93.8	
Labor hold		Swing		

1953 Western Australian state election: Canning
Party	Candidate	Votes	%	±%
Labor	Colin Jamieson	6,344	51.3	+6.0
Liberal and Country	Arthur Griffith	6,022	48.7	+1.9
Total formal votes		12,366	97.5	−0.1
Informal votes		312	2.5	+0.1
Turnout		12,678	93.8	+2.9
Labor gain from Liberal and Country		Swing	+4.1	

1950 Western Australian state election: Canning
Party	Candidate	Votes	%	±%
Liberal and Country	Arthur Griffith	3,793	46.8	
Labor	Alfred Reynolds	3,669	45.3	
Independent Country	Carlyle Ferguson	639	7.9	
Total formal votes		8,101	97.6	
Informal votes		197	2.4	
Turnout		8,298	90.9	
Two-party-preferred result
Liberal and Country	Arthur Griffith	4,274	52.8	
Labor	Alfred Reynolds	3,827	47.2	
Liberal and Country hold		Swing		

=== Elections in the 1940s ===
1947 Western Australian state election: Canning
Party	Candidate	Votes	%	±%
Liberal	George Yates	7,278	56.0	+25.6
Labor	Charles Cross	5,714	44.0	−6.1
Total formal votes		12,992	96.9	+0.2
Informal votes		388	3.1	−0.2
Turnout		13,380	87.1	−1.4
Liberal gain from Labor		Swing	N/A	

1943 Western Australian state election: Canning
Party	Candidate	Votes	%	±%
Labor	Charles Cross	5,636	50.1	+5.1
Nationalist	Arthur Bishop	3,421	30.4	−3.2
Independent	Carlyle Ferguson	1,583	14.1	−7.3
Independent	William Herbert	608	5.4	+5.4
Total formal votes		11,248	96.7	−2.0
Informal votes		386	3.3	+2.0
Turnout		11,634	88.5	−4.3
Labor hold		Swing	N/A	

- Preferences were not distributed.

=== Elections in the 1930s ===
1939 Western Australian state election: Canning
Party	Candidate	Votes	%	±%
Labor	Charles Cross	4,692	45.0	−3.6
Nationalist	Frederick Aberle	3,511	33.6	+10.5
Independent	Carlyle Ferguson	2,230	21.4	+10.7
Total formal votes		10,433	98.7	+0.5
Informal votes		140	1.3	−0.5
Turnout		10,573	92.8	+21.6
Two-party-preferred result
Labor	Charles Cross	5,529	53.0	
Nationalist	Frederick Aberle	4,904	47.0	
Labor hold		Swing	N/A	

1936 Western Australian state election: Canning
Party	Candidate	Votes	%	±%
Labor	Charles Cross	3,299	48.6	+3.5
Nationalist	Herbert Wells	1,567	23.1	+0.6
Nationalist	Thomas Willsmore	988	14.6	+14.6
Independent	Carlyle Ferguson	728	10.7	+10.7
Ind. Nationalist	Oliver Strang	201	3.0	+3.0
Total formal votes		6,783	98.2	+1.5
Informal votes		125	1.8	−1.5
Turnout		6,908	71.2	−21.1
After distribution of preferences
Labor	Charles Cross	3,507	51.9	
Nationalist	Herbert Wells	1,938	28.7	
Nationalist	Thomas Willsmore	1,312	19.4	
Labor hold		Swing		

- Preferences were not distributed to completion.

1933 Western Australian state election: Canning
Party	Candidate	Votes	%	±%
Labor	Charles Cross	3,560	45.1	−4.1
Nationalist	Herbert Wells	1,782	22.5	−28.3
Nationalist	Henry Pilgrim	1,726	21.8	+21.8
Country	Leonard Perrin	834	10.6	+10.6
Total formal votes		7,902	96.7	−2.6
Informal votes		269	3.3	+2.6
Turnout		8,171	92.3	+19.3
Two-party-preferred result
Labor	Charles Cross	4,002	52.8	+3.6
Nationalist	Herbert Wells	3,578	47.2	−3.6
Labor gain from Nationalist		Swing	+3.6	

1930 Western Australian state election: Canning
Party	Candidate	Votes	%	±%
Nationalist	Herbert Wells	2,967	50.8	
Labor	Alexander Clydesdale	2,875	49.2	
Total formal votes		5,842	99.3	
Informal votes		40	0.7	
Turnout		5,882	73.0	
Nationalist gain from Labor		Swing		

=== Elections in the 1920s ===
1927 Western Australian state election: Canning
Party	Candidate	Votes	%	±%
Labor	Alexander Clydesdale	6,815	60.0	−9.8
Nationalist	Herbert Wells	4,549	40.0	+9.8
Total formal votes		11,364	98.8	−0.5
Informal votes		138	1.2	+0.5
Turnout		11,502	66.3	+16.6
Labor hold		Swing	−9.8	

1924 Western Australian state election: Canning
Party	Candidate	Votes	%	±%
Labor	Alec Clydesdale	3,976	69.8	+21.9
Nationalist	Peter Wedd	1,719	30.2	−8.1
Total formal votes		5,695	99.3	+1.3
Informal votes		41	0.7	−1.3
Turnout		5,736	49.7	−20.0
Labor hold		Swing	+14.9	

1921 Western Australian state election: Canning
Party	Candidate	Votes	%	±%
Labor	Alexander Clydesdale	3,213	47.9	+17.7
Nationalist	Robert Robinson	2,571	38.3	−31.5
Independent	Ada Butler	563	8.4	+8.4
Independent	Duncan Munro	364	5.4	+5.4
Total formal votes		6,711	98.0	−0.6
Informal votes		138	2.0	+0.6
Turnout		6,849	69.7	+17.1
Two-party-preferred result
Labor	Alexander Clydesdale	3,687	54.9	+24.7
Nationalist	Robert Robinson	3,024	45.1	−24.7
Labor gain from Nationalist		Swing	+24.7	

=== Elections in the 1910s ===
1917 Western Australian state election: Canning
Party	Candidate	Votes	%	±%
National Liberal	Robert Robinson	2,685	69.8	+16.0
Labor	Donald Cameron	1,161	30.2	–16.0
Total formal votes		3,846	98.6	–1.0
Informal votes		56	1.4	+1.0
Turnout		3,902	52.6	–26.9
National Liberal hold		Swing	+16.0	

1914 Western Australian state election: Canning
Party	Candidate	Votes	%	±%
Labor	Charles Lewis	2,365	46.1	−6.1
Liberal	Robert Robinson	1,578	30.7	+12.5
Liberal	George Wilson	841	16.4	+1.1
Liberal	Arthur Gull	347	6.8	+6.8
Total formal votes		5,131	99.0	−0.1
Informal votes		54	1.0	+0.1
Turnout		5,185	66.7	−15.0
Two-party-preferred result
Liberal	Robert Robinson	2,624	51.1	
Labor	Charles Lewis	2,507	48.9	
Liberal gain from Labor		Swing	N/A	

1911 Western Australian state election: Canning
Party	Candidate	Votes	%	±%
Labor	Charles Lewis	1,711	52.2	
Ministerialist	Hugh Duncan	597	18.2	
Ministerialist	George Wilson	502	15.3	
Ministerialist	William Gordon	299	9.1	
Ministerialist	Robert McMasters	168	5.1	
Total formal votes		3,277	99.1	
Informal votes		29	0.9	
Turnout		3,306	81.7	
Labor gain from Ministerialist		Swing		

- Preferences were not distributed.

=== Elections in the 1900s ===
1908 Western Australian state election: Canning
Party	Candidate	Votes	%	±%
Ministerialist	William Gordon	877	42.4	−8.2
Ministerialist	James Clydesdale	625	30.2	+30.2
Ministerialist	George Wilson	566	27.4	+27.4
Total formal votes		2,068	98.7	−1.2
Informal votes		28	1.3	+1.2
Turnout		2,096	73.9	+28.9
Two-candidate-preferred result
Ministerialist	William Gordon	1,064	55.7	
Ministerialist	James Clydesdale	846	44.3	
Ministerialist hold		Swing	N/A	

1905 Western Australian state election: Canning
Party	Candidate	Votes	%	±%
Ministerialist	William Gordon	643	50.6	+5.3
Independent	James Milligan	496	39.1	+14.5
Ministerialist	Joseph Charles	131	10.3	+10.3
Total formal votes		1,270	99.9	+1.0
Informal votes		1	0.1	–1.0
Turnout		1,271	45.0	–9.0
Ministerialist hold		Swing	N/A	

1904 Western Australian state election: Canning
Party	Candidate	Votes	%	±%
Ministerialist	William Gordon	723	45.3	+45.3
Independent	James Milligan	392	24.6	+24.6
Independent	Norman Ewing	349	21.9	+21.9
Labour	James Healey	131	8.2	+8.2
Total formal votes		1,595	98.9	n/a
Informal votes		17	1.1	n/a
Turnout		1,612	54.0	n/a
Ministerialist win		(new seat)		

=== Elections in the 1890s ===
1897 Western Australian colonial election: Canning
Party	Candidate	Votes	%	±%
Opposition	Frank Wilson	90	48.1	
Ministerialist	William Gibbs	41	21.9	
Ministerialist	Edward Rodoreda	29	15.5	
Ind. Ministerialist	William Stubbs	14	7.5	
Opposition	Marinus Canning	13	7.0	
Total formal votes		187	93.5	
Informal votes		13	6.5	
Turnout		200	62.3	
Opposition hold		Swing		
