= Results of the 1968 Western Australian state election (Legislative Assembly) =

Western Australian state election, 23 March 1968 Legislative Assembly << 1965–1971 >>
Enrolled voters	359,790^{[1]}				
Votes cast	331,325		Turnout	92.09%	–0.24%
Informal votes	10,255		Informal	3.10%	–0.01%
Summary of votes by party
Party	Primary votes	%	Swing	Seats	Change
Labor	145,605	45.35%	+2.71%	23	+ 2
Liberal and Country	141,271	44.00%	–4.54%	19	– 2
Country	16,879	5.25%	+0.38%	9	+ 1
Democratic Labor	10,456	3.26%	+2.32%	0	± 0
Democratic	2,216	0.69%	+0.69%	0	± 0
Communist	1,694	0.53%	+0.44%	0	± 0
Independent	2,949	0.92%	–1.98%	0	± 0
Total	321,070			51	

This is a list of electoral district results of the 1968 Western Australian election.

== Results by electoral district ==
=== Albany ===
1968 Western Australian state election: Albany
Party	Candidate	Votes	%	±%
Labor	Jack Hall	2,958	55.4	
Liberal and Country	Henry Ayers	2,386	44.6	
Total formal votes		5,344	98.8	
Informal votes		65	1.2	
Turnout		5,409	93.4	
Labor hold		Swing		

=== Ascot ===
1968 Western Australian state election: Ascot
Party	Candidate	Votes	%	±%
Labor	Merv Toms	7,011	63.2	
Liberal and Country	Douglas Anderson	4,080	36.8	
Total formal votes		11,091	97.6	
Informal votes		277	2.4	
Turnout		11,368	91.6	
Labor hold		Swing		

=== Avon ===
1968 Western Australian state election: Avon
Party	Candidate	Votes	%	±%
Country	Harry Gayfer	unopposed		
Country hold		Swing		

=== Balcatta ===
1968 Western Australian state election: Balcatta
Party	Candidate	Votes	%	±%
Labor	Herb Graham	8,014	63.4	
Liberal and Country	Anthony Scolaro	4,626	36.6	
Total formal votes		12,640	96.1	
Informal votes		519	3.9	
Turnout		13,159	93.1	
Labor hold		Swing		

=== Belmont ===
1968 Western Australian state election: Belmont
Party	Candidate	Votes	%	±%
Labor	Colin Jamieson	7,105	64.5	
Liberal and Country	Bruce Tomlinson	3,905	35.5	
Total formal votes		11,010	97.6	
Informal votes		265	2.4	
Turnout		11,275	92.2	
Labor hold		Swing		

=== Blackwood ===
1968 Western Australian state election: Blackwood
Party	Candidate	Votes	%	±%
Country	Ron Kitney	2,798	54.6	
Liberal and Country	John Hearman	2,324	45.4	
Total formal votes		5,122	96.5	
Informal votes		184	3.5	
Turnout		5,306	93.7	
Country gain from Liberal and Country		Swing		

=== Boulder-Dundas ===
1968 Western Australian state election: Boulder-Dundas
Party	Candidate	Votes	%	±%
Labor	Arthur Moir	unopposed		
Labor hold		Swing		

=== Bunbury ===
1968 Western Australian state election: Bunbury
Party	Candidate	Votes	%	±%
Liberal and Country	Maurice Williams	3,107	52.6	
Labor	Alexandra White	2,584	43.8	
Democratic Labor	John Guidera	213	3.6	
Total formal votes		5,904	98.5	
Informal votes		88	1.5	
Turnout		5,992	93.7	
Two-party-preferred result
Liberal and Country	Maurice Williams	3,305	55.7	
Labor	Alexandra White	2,599	44.3	
Liberal and Country hold		Swing		

=== Canning ===
1968 Western Australian state election: Canning
Party	Candidate	Votes	%	±%
Labor	Tom Bateman	6,185	48.5	
Liberal and Country	Ross Elliott	5,683	44.5	
Democratic Labor	Lydia Obbes	498	3.9	
Independent	Melford Roe	397	3.1	
Total formal votes		12,763	96.3	
Informal votes		485	3.7	
Turnout		13,248	92.8	
Two-party-preferred result
Labor	Tom Bateman	6,441	50.5	
Liberal and Country	Ross Elliott	6,322	49.5	
Labor gain from Liberal and Country		Swing		

=== Clontarf ===
1968 Western Australian state election: Clontarf
Party	Candidate	Votes	%	±%
Labor	Donald May	5,613	50.1	
Liberal and Country	Paul Buddee	4,697	41.9	
Democratic Labor	John Martyr	604	5.4	
Independent	Ian Skipworth	284	2.5	
Total formal votes		11,198	96.0	
Informal votes		467	4.0	
Turnout		11,665	91.4	
Two-party-preferred result
Labor	Donald May	5,846	52.2	
Liberal and Country	Paul Buddee	5,352	47.8	
Labor gain from Liberal and Country		Swing		

=== Cockburn ===
1968 Western Australian state election: Cockburn
Party	Candidate	Votes	%	±%
Labor	Don Taylor	8,360	68.6	
Liberal and Country	Stanley Elliman	3,825	31.4	
Total formal votes		12,185	95.1	
Informal votes		622	4.9	
Turnout		12,807	92.7	
Labor hold		Swing		

=== Collie ===
1968 Western Australian state election: Collie
Party	Candidate	Votes	%	±%
Labor	Tom Jones	2,827	53.3	
Liberal and Country	Bob Pike	2,125	40.1	
Independent	John Davidson	352	6.6	
Total formal votes		5,304	98.7	
Informal votes		70	1.3	
Turnout		5,374	95.1	
Two-party-preferred result
Labor	Tom Jones	3,003	56.6	
Liberal and Country	Bob Pike	2,301	43.4	
Labor hold		Swing		

=== Cottesloe ===
1968 Western Australian state election: Cottesloe
Party	Candidate	Votes	%	±%
Liberal and Country	Ross Hutchinson	6,643	57.3	
Labor	Christopher Caldwell	4,325	37.3	
Independent	Lola Griggs	620	5.4	
Total formal votes		11,588	98.2	
Informal votes		214	1.8	
Turnout		11,802	90.8	
Two-party-preferred result
Liberal and Country	Ross Hutchinson	6,953	60.0	
Labor	Christopher Caldwell	4,635	40.0	
Liberal and Country hold		Swing		

=== Dale ===
1968 Western Australian state election: Dale
Party	Candidate	Votes	%	±%
Liberal and Country	Cyril Rushton	4,260	65.4	
Labor	James Wolfe	2,255	34.6	
Total formal votes		6,515	95.8	
Informal votes		288	4.2	
Turnout		6,803	95.4	
Liberal and Country hold		Swing		

=== Darling Range ===
1968 Western Australian state election: Darling Range
Party	Candidate	Votes	%	±%
Liberal and Country	Ken Dunn	3,293	52.7	
Labor	Alick Smith	1,952	31.3	
Country	George Spriggs	861	13.8	
Country	Daniel Varney	141	2.3	
Total formal votes		6,247	95.6	
Informal votes		286	4.4	
Turnout		6,533	95.3	
Two-party-preferred result
Liberal and Country	Ken Dunn	4,138	66.2	
Labor	Alick Smith	2,109	33.8	
Liberal and Country hold		Swing		

=== East Melville ===
1968 Western Australian state election: East Melville
Party	Candidate	Votes	%	±%
Liberal and Country	Des O'Neil	8,800	74.9	
Communist	Victor Williams	1,694	14.4	
Independent	Ralph Von Paleske	1,249	10.6	
Total formal votes		11,743	94.6	
Informal votes		666	5.4	
Turnout		12,409	92.9	
Two-candidate-preferred result
Liberal and Country	Des O'Neil	9,425	80.3	
Communist	Victor Williams	2,318	19.7	
Liberal and Country hold		Swing		

=== Floreat ===
1968 Western Australian state election: Floreat
Party	Candidate	Votes	%	±%
Liberal and Country	Andrew Mensaros	4,938	45.7	
Labor	Lyla Elliott	3,474	32.2	
Country	George Gummow	1,546	14.3	
Democratic Labor	Bernard Flanagan	839	7.8	
Total formal votes		10,797	98.2	
Informal votes		199	1.8	
Turnout		10,996	92.1	
Two-party-preferred result
Liberal and Country	Andrew Mensaros	6,977	64.6	
Labor	Lyla Elliott	3,820	35.4	
Liberal and Country hold		Swing		

=== Fremantle ===
1968 Western Australian state election: Fremantle
Party	Candidate	Votes	%	±%
Labor	Harry Fletcher	7,393	73.5	
Democratic Labor	William Kenneally	2,673	26.5	
Total formal votes		10,066	94.7	
Informal votes		565	5.3	
Turnout		10,631	90.7	
Labor hold		Swing		

=== Gascoyne ===
1968 Western Australian state election: Gascoyne
Party	Candidate	Votes	%	±%
Labor	Daniel Norton	1,321	62.2	
Liberal and Country	Peter Butler	724	34.1	
Independent	Neville Brandstater	79	3.7	
Total formal votes		2,124	97.4	
Informal votes		56	2.6	
Turnout		2,180	84.7	
Two-party-preferred result
Labor	Daniel Norton	1,361	64.1	
Liberal and Country	Peter Butler	763	35.9	
Labor hold		Swing		

=== Geraldton ===
1968 Western Australian state election: Geraldton
Party	Candidate	Votes	%	±%
Labor	Bill Sewell	3,103	56.2	
Liberal and Country	Phillip Cooper	2,423	43.8	
Total formal votes		5,526	98.9	
Informal votes		60	1.1	
Turnout		5,586	90.8	
Labor hold		Swing		

=== Greenough ===
1968 Western Australian state election: Greenough
Party	Candidate	Votes	%	±%
Liberal and Country	David Brand	unopposed		
Liberal and Country hold		Swing		

=== Kalgoorlie ===
1968 Western Australian state election: Kalgoorlie
Party	Candidate	Votes	%	±%
Labor	Tom Evans	unopposed		
Labor hold		Swing		

=== Karrinyup ===
1968 Western Australian state election: Karrinyup
Party	Candidate	Votes	%	±%
Labor	Stan Lapham	5,720	53.5	
Liberal and Country	John Waghorne	4,422	41.3	
Democratic Labor	Arthur White	552	5.2	
Total formal votes		10,694	97.0	
Informal votes		332	3.0	
Turnout		11,026	92.4	
Two-party-preferred result
Labor	Stan Lapham	5,803	54.3	
Liberal and Country	John Waghorne	4,891	45.7	
Labor gain from Liberal and Country		Swing		

=== Katanning ===
1968 Western Australian state election: Katanning
Party	Candidate	Votes	%	±%
Country	Crawford Nalder	unopposed		
Country hold		Swing		

=== Kimberley ===
1968 Western Australian state election: Kimberley
Party	Candidate	Votes	%	±%
Liberal and Country	Alan Ridge	1,159	52.2	
Labor	John Rhatigan	1,060	47.8	
Total formal votes		2,219	98.9	
Informal votes		25	1.1	
Turnout		2,244	80.5	
Liberal and Country gain from Labor		Swing		

=== Maylands ===
1968 Western Australian state election: Maylands
Party	Candidate	Votes	%	±%
Labor	John Harman	5,459	51.0	
Liberal and Country	Bob Marshall	4,491	42.0	
Democratic Labor	Francis Pownall	472	4.4	
Independent	Cornelis de Bruin	276	2.6	
Total formal votes		10,698	97.6	
Informal votes		264	2.4	
Turnout		10,962	91.5	
Two-party-preferred result
Labor	John Harman	5,668	53.0	
Liberal and Country	Bob Marshall	5,030	47.0	
Labor gain from Liberal and Country		Swing		

=== Melville ===
1968 Western Australian state election: Melville
Party	Candidate	Votes	%	±%
Labor	John Tonkin	7,566	67.5	
Liberal and Country	Albert Box	3,636	32.5	
Total formal votes		11,202	97.3	
Informal votes		305	2.7	
Turnout		11,507	93.9	
Labor hold		Swing		

=== Merredin-Yilgarn ===
1968 Western Australian state election: Merredin-Yilgarn
Party	Candidate	Votes	%	±%
Labor	James Brown	2,260	39.9	
Liberal and Country	Jack Stewart	1,460	25.8	
Country	Geoffrey Telfer	1,343	23.7	
Independent	Raymond Evans	602	10.6	
Total formal votes		5,665	98.9	
Informal votes		65	1.1	
Turnout		5,730	93.9	
Two-party-preferred result
Liberal and Country	Jack Stewart	2,996	52.9	
Labor	James Brown	2,669	47.1	
Liberal and Country gain from Labor		Swing		

=== Mirrabooka ===
1968 Western Australian state election: Mirrabooka
Party	Candidate	Votes	%	±%
Liberal and Country	Doug Cash	6,035	47.7	
Labor	Kevin Parker	5,779	45.7	
Democratic Labor	John Poole	843	6.7	
Total formal votes		12,657	97.9	
Informal votes		276	2.1	
Turnout		12,933	93.8	
Two-party-preferred result
Liberal and Country	Doug Cash	6,679	52.8	
Labor	Kevin Parker	5,978	47.2	
Liberal and Country hold		Swing		

=== Moore ===
1968 Western Australian state election: Moore
Party	Candidate	Votes	%	±%
Country	Edgar Lewis	2,984	52.3	
Independent	Albert Tonkin	2,721	47.7	
Total formal votes		5,705	97.4	
Informal votes		154	2.6	
Turnout		5,859	93.3	
Country hold		Swing		

=== Mount Hawthorn ===
1968 Western Australian state election: Mount Hawthorn
Party	Candidate	Votes	%	±%
Labor	Ron Bertram	5,831	52.9	
Liberal and Country	James Ring	4,279	38.9	
Democratic Labor	Gavan O'Connor	905	8.2	
Total formal votes		11,015	95.4	
Informal votes		528	4.6	
Turnout		11,543	92.0	
Two-party-preferred result
Labor	Ron Bertram	5,967	54.2	
Liberal and Country	James Ring	5,048	45.8	
Labor hold		Swing		

=== Mount Lawley ===
1968 Western Australian state election: Mount Lawley
Party	Candidate	Votes	%	±%
Liberal and Country	Ray O'Connor	6,655	60.0	
Labor	Patrick Weir	4,440	40.0	
Total formal votes		11,095	96.3	
Informal votes		420	3.7	
Turnout		11,515	91.4	
Liberal and Country hold		Swing		

=== Mount Marshall ===
1968 Western Australian state election: Mount Marshall
Party	Candidate	Votes	%	±%
Country	Ray McPharlin	unopposed		
Country hold		Swing		

=== Murchison-Eyre ===
1968 Western Australian state election: Murchison-Eyre
Party	Candidate	Votes	%	±%
Liberal and Country	Richard Burt	unopposed		
Liberal and Country hold		Swing		

=== Murray ===
1968 Western Australian state election: Murray
Party	Candidate	Votes	%	±%
Liberal and Country	Ewart Runciman	3,338	53.8	
Labor	Fred Crockenberg	2,861	46.2	
Total formal votes		6,199	98.5	
Informal votes		93	1.5	
Turnout		6,292	94.6	
Liberal and Country hold		Swing		

=== Narrogin ===
1968 Western Australian state election: Narrogin
Party	Candidate	Votes	%	±%
Country	William Manning	unopposed		
Country hold		Swing		

=== Nedlands ===
1968 Western Australian state election: Nedlands
Party	Candidate	Votes	%	±%
Liberal and Country	Charles Court	8,533	76.6	
Labor	Eric Hicks	2,599	23.4	
Total formal votes		11,132	98.4	
Informal votes		178	1.6	
Turnout		11,310	89.7	
Liberal and Country hold		Swing		

=== Northam ===
1968 Western Australian state election: Northam
Party	Candidate	Votes	%	±%
Labor	Ken McIver	2,674	48.8	
Liberal and Country	Claude Roediger	1,808	33.0	
Country	Maurice Armstrong	1,003	18.3	
Total formal votes		5,485	98.9	
Informal votes		60	1.1	
Turnout		5,545	93.6	
Two-party-preferred result
Labor	Ken McIver	2,942	53.6	
Liberal and Country	Claude Roediger	2,543	46.4	
Labor hold		Swing		

=== Perth ===
1968 Western Australian state election: Perth
Party	Candidate	Votes	%	±%
Labor	Terry Burke	5,141	49.9	
Liberal and Country	Peter Durack	3,643	35.3	
Independent	Paul Ritter	1,128	11.0	
Democratic Labor	William Spence	393	3.8	
Total formal votes		10,305	95.7	
Informal votes		458	4.3	
Turnout		10,763	86.2	
Two-party-preferred result
Labor	Terry Burke	5,793	56.2	
Liberal and Country	Peter Durack	4,512	43.8	
Labor gain from Liberal and Country		Swing		

=== Pilbara ===
1968 Western Australian state election: Pilbara
Party	Candidate	Votes	%	±%
Labor	Arthur Bickerton	unopposed		
Labor hold		Swing		

=== Roe ===
1968 Western Australian state election: Roe
Party	Candidate	Votes	%	±%
Country	Bill Young	2,931	46.0	
Liberal and Country	Mel Bungey	2,209	34.7	
Labor	John Jehu	1,226	19.3	
Total formal votes		6,366	98.8	
Informal votes		80	1.2	
Turnout		6,446	94.5	
Two-candidate-preferred result
Country	Bill Young	3,799	59.7	
Liberal and Country	Mel Bungey	2,567	40.3	
Country hold		Swing		

=== South Perth ===
1968 Western Australian state election: South Perth
Party	Candidate	Votes	%	±%
Liberal and Country	Bill Grayden	8,195	78.6	
Democratic Labor	Brian Peachey	2,229	21.4	
Total formal votes		10,424	92.7	
Informal votes		823	7.3	
Turnout		11,247	89.8	
Liberal and Country hold		Swing		

=== Stirling ===
1968 Western Australian state election: Stirling
Party	Candidate	Votes	%	±%
Country	Clayton Mitchell	unopposed		
Country hold		Swing		

=== Subiaco ===
1968 Western Australian state election: Subiaco
Party	Candidate	Votes	%	±%
Liberal and Country	Hugh Guthrie	5,316	47.9	
Labor	Ronnay Foster	5,153	46.4	
Independent	Jacqueline Lander	639	5.7	
Total formal votes		11,108	97.6	
Informal votes		276	2.4	
Turnout		11,384	90.4	
Two-party-preferred result
Liberal and Country	Hugh Guthrie	5,603	50.4	
Labor	Ronnay Foster	5,505	49.6	
Liberal and Country hold		Swing		

=== Swan ===
1968 Western Australian state election: Swan
Party	Candidate	Votes	%	±%
Labor	John Brady	7,852	71.0	
Liberal and Country	John Pitsikas	3,201	29.0	
Total formal votes		11,053	97.8	
Informal votes		250	2.2	
Turnout		11,303	92.3	
Labor hold		Swing		

=== Toodyay ===
1968 Western Australian state election: Toodyay
Party	Candidate	Votes	%	±%
Country	James Craig	2,811	54.7	
Labor	Edmond Hewett	2,329	45.3	
Total formal votes		5,140	96.3	
Informal votes		195	3.7	
Turnout		5,335	94.4	
Country hold		Swing		

=== Vasse ===
1968 Western Australian state election: Vasse
Party	Candidate	Votes	%	±%
Liberal and Country	William Bovell	unopposed		
Liberal and Country hold		Swing		

=== Victoria Park ===
1968 Western Australian state election: Victoria Park
Party	Candidate	Votes	%	±%
Labor	Ron Davies	unopposed		
Labor hold		Swing		

=== Warren ===
1968 Western Australian state election: Warren
Party	Candidate	Votes	%	±%
Labor	David Evans	3,175	55.3	
Liberal and Country	Gordon Thompson	2,331	40.6	
Democratic Labor	Francis Dwyer	235	4.1	
Total formal votes		5,741	98.3	
Informal votes		97	1.7	
Turnout		5,838	94.5	
Two-party-preferred result
Labor	David Evans	6,122	58.8	
Liberal and Country	Gordon Thompson	4,289	41.2	
Labor hold		Swing		

=== Wellington ===
1968 Western Australian state election: Wellington
Party	Candidate	Votes	%	±%
Liberal and Country	Iven Manning	unopposed		
Liberal and Country hold		Swing		

=== Wembley ===
1968 Western Australian state election: Wembley
Party	Candidate	Votes	%	±%
Liberal and Country	Guy Henn	unopposed		
Liberal and Country hold		Swing		

== See also ==
- 1968 Western Australian state election
- Members of the Western Australian Legislative Assembly, 1968–1971
- Candidates of the 1968 Western Australian state election
