= Members of the Western Australian Legislative Assembly, 1968–1971 =

This is a list of members of the Western Australian Legislative Assembly from 1968 to 1971:

| Name | Party | District | Years in office |
|---|---|---|---|
| Tom Bateman | Labor | Canning | 1968–1986 |
| Ron Bertram | Labor | Mount Hawthorn | 1968–1989 |
| Arthur Bickerton | Labor | Pilbara | 1958–1974 |
| Stewart Bovell | Liberal | Vasse | 1947–1971 |
| John Brady | Labor | Swan | 1948–1974 |
| Sir David Brand | Liberal | Greenough | 1945–1975 |
| Terry Burke | Labor | Perth | 1968–1987 |
| Richard Burt | Liberal | Murchison-Eyre | 1959–1971 |
| Doug Cash | Liberal | Mirrabooka | 1968–1971 |
| Wyndham Cook^{[1]} | Labor | Albany | 1970–1974 |
| Charles Court | Liberal | Nedlands | 1953–1982 |
| James Craig | Country | Toodyay | 1959–1971 |
| Ron Davies | Labor | Victoria Park | 1961–1986 |
| Ken Dunn | Liberal | Darling Range | 1962–1971 |
| David Evans | Labor | Warren | 1968–1989 |
| Tom Evans | Labor | Kalgoorlie | 1956–1980 |
| Harry Fletcher | Labor | Fremantle | 1959–1977 |
| Harry Gayfer | Country | Avon | 1962–1974 |
| Herb Graham | Labor | Balcatta | 1943–1973 |
| Bill Grayden | Liberal | South Perth | 1947–1949; 1956–1993 |
| Hugh Guthrie | Liberal | Subiaco | 1959–1971 |
| Jack Hall^{[1]} | Labor | Albany | 1956–1970 |
| John Harman | Labor | Maylands | 1968–1986 |
| Guy Henn | Liberal | Wembley | 1959–1971 |
| Ross Hutchinson | Liberal | Cottesloe | 1950–1977 |
| Colin Jamieson | Labor | Belmont | 1953–1986 |
| Tom Jones | Labor | Collie | 1968–1989 |
| Ron Kitney | Country | Blackwood | 1968–1971 |
| Stan Lapham | Labor | Karrinyup | 1953–1959; 1968–1974 |
| Edgar Lewis | Country | Moore | 1958–1974 |
| Iven Manning | Liberal | Wellington | 1950–1974 |
| William Manning | Country | Narrogin | 1956–1974 |
| Donald May | Labor | Clontarf | 1962–1965; 1968–1977 |
| Ken McIver | Labor | Northam | 1968–1986 |
| Ray McPharlin | Country | Mount Marshall | 1967–1983 |
| Andrew Mensaros | Liberal | Floreat | 1968–1991 |
| Clayton Mitchell | Country | Stirling | 1962–1971 |
| Arthur Moir | Labor | Boulder-Dundas | 1951–1971 |
| Crawford Nalder | Country | Katanning | 1947–1974 |
| Daniel Norton | Labor | Gascoyne | 1953–1974 |
| Ray O'Connor | Liberal | Mount Lawley | 1959–1984 |
| Des O'Neil | Liberal | East Melville | 1959–1980 |
| Alan Ridge | Liberal | Kimberley | 1968–1980 |
| Ewart Runciman | Liberal | Murray | 1962–1974 |
| Cyril Rushton | Liberal | Dale | 1965–1988 |
| Bill Sewell | Labor | Geraldton | 1950–1974 |
| Jack Stewart | Liberal | Merredin-Yilgarn | 1968–1971 |
| Don Taylor | Labor | Cockburn | 1968–1984 |
| Merv Toms | Labor | Ascot | 1956–1971 |
| John Tonkin | Labor | Melville | 1933–1977 |
| Maurice Williams | Liberal | Bunbury | 1962–1973 |
| Bill Young | Country | Roe | 1967–1974 |

== Notes ==
^{1} On 14 April 1970, the Labor member for Albany, Jack Hall, resigned. Labor candidate Wyndham Cook won the resulting by-election on 6 June 1970.

== Sources ==
- "Former Members" (PDF). Parliament of Western Australia. 2011. Archived from the original (PDF) on 7 August 2011.
