= Electoral results for the district of South Perth =

Western Australian district election results

This is a list of electoral results for the electoral district of South Perth in Western Australian state elections.

== Members for South Perth ==
South Perth (1901–1904)
Member	Party	Term
William Gordon	Ministerial	1901–1904
South Perth (1950–present)
Member	Party	Term
George Yates	Liberal Country League	1950–1956
Bill Grayden	Independent Liberal	1956–1959
Bill Grayden	Liberal Country League	1959–1968
Bill Grayden	Liberal	1968–1993
Phillip Pendal	Liberal	1993–1995
Phillip Pendal	Independent	1995–2005
John McGrath	Liberal	2005–2021
Geoff Baker	Labor	2021–present

== Election results ==
=== Elections in the 2020s ===
2025 Western Australian state election: South Perth
Party	Candidate	Votes	%	±%
Liberal	Bronwyn Waugh	10,467	40.4	+4.9
Labor	Geoff Baker	9,497	36.6	−13.3
Greens	Carl Evers	3,517	13.6	+3.1
National	Jeremy Miles	1,236	4.8	+4.8
Independent	Andrew Quin	643	2.5	+2.5
Christians	Rachel Yuan Zhuang	574	2.2	+2.2
Total formal votes		25,934	96.9	−0.1
Informal votes		834	3.1	+0.1
Turnout		26,768	88.0	+2.3
Two-party-preferred result
Labor	Geoff Baker	13,375	51.6	−8.5
Liberal	Bronwyn Waugh	12,551	48.4	+8.5
Labor hold		Swing	−8.5	

2021 Western Australian state election: South Perth
Party	Candidate	Votes	%	±%
Labor	Geoff Baker	12,473	49.9	+20.3
Liberal	Ryan Chorley	8,846	35.4	−14.7
Greens	Mark Brogan	2,597	10.4	−1.4
Liberal Democrats	Jack Taylor	617	2.5	+2.5
No Mandatory Vaccination	Dwain Hill	440	1.8	+1.8
Total formal votes		24,973	97.0	+0.6
Informal votes		780	3.0	−0.6
Turnout		25,753	86.7	+0.6
Two-party-preferred result
Labor	Geoff Baker	15,007	60.1	+17.3
Liberal	Ryan Chorley	9,962	39.9	−17.3
Labor gain from Liberal		Swing	+17.3	

=== Elections in the 2010s ===
2017 Western Australian state election: South Perth
Party	Candidate	Votes	%	±%
Liberal	John McGrath	11,899	50.0	−15.9
Labor	Michael Voros	7,062	29.7	+7.0
Greens	Mark Brogan	2,806	11.8	+2.7
Independent	Fiona Reid	884	3.7	+3.7
Micro Business	Jason St Martin	443	1.9	+1.9
Christians	Rosemary Steineck	441	1.9	+1.9
Independent	M. Francis	244	1.0	+1.0
Total formal votes		23,779	96.4	+1.5
Informal votes		897	3.6	−1.5
Turnout		24,676	86.7	−0.2
Two-party-preferred result
Liberal	John McGrath	13,585	57.1	−12.9
Labor	Michael Voros	10,187	42.9	+12.9
Liberal hold		Swing	−12.9	

2013 Western Australian state election: South Perth
Party	Candidate	Votes	%	±%
Liberal	John McGrath	13,654	67.0	+14.1
Labor	Dustin Rafferty	4,432	21.7	–2.2
Greens	Peter Best	1,800	8.8	–1.7
Independent	David Mangini	501	2.5	+2.5
Total formal votes		20,387	94.9	−0.8
Informal votes		1,095	5.1	+0.8
Turnout		21,482	88.6	
Two-party-preferred result
Liberal	John McGrath	14,494	71.1	+6.8
Labor	Dustin Rafferty	5,890	28.9	–6.8
Liberal hold		Swing	+6.8	

=== Elections in the 2000s ===
2008 Western Australian state election: South Perth
Party	Candidate	Votes	%	±%
Liberal	John McGrath	10,136	52.9	+7.5
Labor	Leena Michael	4,594	24.0	−8.5
Greens	Ros Harman	2,016	10.5	+2.1
Independent	Jim Grayden	1,767	9.2	−1.7
Family First	Karen McDonald	473	2.5	+2.5
Independent	Frank Hough	184	1.0	+1.0
Total formal votes		19,170	95.7	−0.9
Informal votes		858	4.3	+0.9
Turnout		20,028	85.1	
Two-party-preferred result
Liberal	John McGrath	12,310	64.3	+6.9
Labor	Leena Michael	6,845	35.7	−6.9
Liberal hold		Swing	+6.9	

2005 Western Australian state election: South Perth
Party	Candidate	Votes	%	±%
Liberal	John McGrath	10,689	44.2	+14.3
Labor	Dale Kelliher	8,184	33.9	+6.6
Independent	Jim Grayden	2,542	10.5	+10.5
Greens	Alan Hopkins	2,071	8.6	+2.1
Christian Democrats	Michael Davis	673	2.8	+2.8
Total formal votes		24,159	96.4	−0.4
Informal votes		905	3.6	+0.4
Turnout		25,064	89.2	
Two-party-preferred result
Liberal	John McGrath	13,478	55.8	−2.3
Labor	Dale Kelliher	10,674	44.2	+44.2
Liberal gain from Independent		Swing	N/A	

2001 Western Australian state election: South Perth
Party	Candidate	Votes	%	±%
Independent	Phillip Pendal	6,375	30.8	−8.8
Liberal	Andrew Murfin	6,251	30.2	−3.1
Labor	Daniel Smith	4,943	23.9	+4.1
Greens	Paul Smith	1,326	6.4	−0.8
Independent	Claire Allison	1,127	5.4	+5.4
Democrats	Mark Reynolds	676	3.3	+3.3
Total formal votes		20,698	97.2	−0.2
Informal votes		599	2.8	+0.2
Turnout		21,297	89.2	
Two-party-preferred result
Liberal	Andrew Murfin	12,520	60.9	−10.1
Labor	Daniel Smith	8,024	39.1	+10.1
Two-candidate-preferred result
Independent	Phillip Pendal	12,924	62.8	−1.4
Liberal	Andrew Murfin	7,671	37.2	+1.4
Independent hold		Swing	−1.4	

=== Elections in the 1990s ===
1996 Western Australian state election: South Perth
Party	Candidate	Votes	%	±%
Independent	Phillip Pendal	8,058	39.6	+39.6
Liberal	Peter Spencer	6,764	33.3	−24.8
Labor	Kim Bryant	4,031	19.8	+17.3
Greens	Andrew Thomson	1,473	7.2	−1.4
Total formal votes		20,326	97.4	+1.5
Informal votes		553	2.6	−1.5
Turnout		20,879	88.0	
Two-candidate-preferred result
Independent	Phillip Pendal	13,045	64.2	+64.2
Liberal	Peter Spencer	7,270	35.8	−30.8
Independent gain from Liberal		Swing	+64.2	

1993 Western Australian state election: South Perth
Party	Candidate	Votes	%	±%
Liberal	Phillip Pendal	10,734	58.7	+8.0
Independent	Jim Grayden	4,711	25.8	+25.8
Greens	Troy Ellis	1,587	8.7	+8.7
Democrats	Gordon Edwards	626	3.4	+3.4
Independent	Isobel	333	1.8	+1.8
Independent	Brett Miller	301	1.7	+1.7
Total formal votes		18,292	95.8	+1.5
Informal votes		801	4.2	−1.5
Turnout		19,093	91.9	+3.4
Two-candidate-preferred result
Liberal	Phillip Pendal	11,555	63.2	+1.9
Independent	Jim Grayden	6,737	36.8	+36.8
Liberal hold		Swing	+1.9	

=== Elections in the 1980s ===
1989 Western Australian state election: South Perth
Party	Candidate	Votes	%	±%
Liberal	Bill Grayden	8,980	50.7	−4.6
Labor	Joan Davison	5,994	33.9	−10.8
Independent	David Smith	1,567	8.9	+8.9
Grey Power	Beatrice Trutmann	1,162	6.6	+6.6
Total formal votes		17,703	94.3	
Informal votes		1,071	5.7	
Turnout		18,774	88.5	
Two-party-preferred result
Liberal	Bill Grayden	10,846	61.3	+6.0
Labor	Joan Davison	6,857	38.7	−6.0
Liberal hold		Swing	+6.0	

1986 Western Australian state election: South Perth
Party	Candidate	Votes	%	±%
Liberal	Bill Grayden	8,921	56.5	+2.0
Labor	Jennifer McNae	6,871	43.5	−2.0
Total formal votes		15,792	97.9	−0.1
Informal votes		345	2.1	+0.1
Turnout		16,137	89.7	+3.8
Liberal hold		Swing	+2.0	

1983 Western Australian state election: South Perth
Party	Candidate	Votes	%	±%
Liberal	Bill Grayden	7,836	54.5	
Labor	Sten Jakobsen	6,533	45.5	
Total formal votes		14,369	98.0	
Informal votes		288	2.0	
Turnout		14,657	85.9	
Liberal hold		Swing		

1980 Western Australian state election: South Perth
Party	Candidate	Votes	%	±%
Liberal	Bill Grayden	7,132	58.4	−4.4
Labor	Malcolm Trudgen	3,950	32.3	−4.9
Democrats	Kevin Trent	1,133	9.3	+9.3
Total formal votes		12,215	97.1	−0.3
Informal votes		364	2.9	+0.3
Turnout		12,579	84.7	−3.3
Two-party-preferred result
Liberal	Bill Grayden	7,698	63.0	+0.2
Labor	Malcolm Trudgen	4,517	37.0	−0.2
Liberal hold		Swing	+0.2	

=== Elections in the 1970s ===
1977 Western Australian state election: South Perth
Party	Candidate	Votes	%	±%
Liberal	Bill Grayden	8,162	62.8	
Labor	Bill Johnson	4,832	37.2	
Total formal votes		12,994	97.4	
Informal votes		345	2.6	
Turnout		13,339	88.0	
Liberal hold		Swing		

1974 Western Australian state election: South Perth
Party	Candidate	Votes	%	±%
Liberal	Bill Grayden	6,720	50.8	
Labor	Garry Kelly	5,295	40.0	
National Alliance	Bill Wallace	1,215	9.2	
Total formal votes		13,230	97.5	
Informal votes		341	2.5	
Turnout		13,571	87.6	
Two-party-preferred result
Liberal	Bill Grayden	7,753	58.6	
Labor	Garry Kelly	5,477	41.4	
Liberal hold		Swing		

1971 Western Australian state election: South Perth
Party	Candidate	Votes	%	±%
Liberal	Bill Grayden	6,247	53.8	−24.8
Labor	William Johnson	4,378	37.7	+37.7
Democratic Labor	Emil Murray	818	7.0	−14.4
Australia	Arthur Williams	175	1.5	+1.5
Total formal votes		11,618	97.3	+4.6
Informal votes		320	2.7	−4.6
Turnout		11,938	89.5	−0.3
Two-party-preferred result
Liberal	Bill Grayden	7,030	60.5	−18.1
Labor	William Johnson	4,588	39.5	+39.5
Liberal hold		Swing	N/A	

=== Elections in the 1960s ===
1968 Western Australian state election: South Perth
Party	Candidate	Votes	%	±%
Liberal and Country	Bill Grayden	8,195	78.6	
Democratic Labor	Brian Peachey	2,229	21.4	
Total formal votes		10,424	92.7	
Informal votes		823	7.3	
Turnout		11,247	89.8	
Liberal and Country hold		Swing		

1965 Western Australian state election: South Perth
Party	Candidate	Votes	%	±%
Liberal and Country	Bill Grayden	unopposed		
Liberal and Country hold		Swing		

1962 Western Australian state election: South Perth
Party	Candidate	Votes	%	±%
Liberal and Country	Bill Grayden	5,557	53.8	
Independent	Harry Repacholi	3,117	30.2	
Independent Liberal	George Strickland	1,648	16.0	
Total formal votes		10,322	97.5	
Informal votes		262	2.5	
Turnout		10,584	92.7	
Two-candidate-preferred result
Liberal and Country	Bill Grayden		61.5	
Independent	Harry Repacholi		38.5	
Liberal and Country hold		Swing		

- Two candidate preferred vote was estimated.

=== Elections in the 1950s ===
1959 Western Australian state election: South Perth
Party	Candidate	Votes	%	±%
Independent Liberal	Bill Grayden	5,045	54.5	+27.9
Liberal and Country	George Strickland	4,208	45.5	+18.4
Total formal votes		9,253	97.2	−0.8
Informal votes		266	2.8	+0.8
Turnout		9,519	93.4	0.0
Independent Liberal hold		Swing	N/A	

1956 Western Australian state election: South Perth
Party	Candidate	Votes	%	±%
Labor	Francis French	3,615	38.8	
Liberal and Country	James Smith	2,523	27.1	
Independent Liberal	Bill Grayden	2,482	26.6	
Independent	Cole Sangster	704	7.6	
Total formal votes		9,324	98.0	
Informal votes		191	2.0	
Turnout		9,515	93.4	
Two-candidate-preferred result
Independent Liberal	Bill Grayden	5,437	58.3	
Labor	Francis French	3,887	41.7	
Independent Liberal gain from Liberal and Country		Swing		

1953 Western Australian state election: South Perth
Party	Candidate	Votes	%	±%
Liberal and Country	George Yates	3,656	46.7	−11.4
Labor	Francis French	3,173	40.6	−1.3
Independent	Carlyle Ferguson	996	12.7	+12.7
Total formal votes		7,825	97.6	−0.5
Informal votes		194	2.4	+0.5
Turnout		8,019	94.0	+2.3
Two-party-preferred result
Liberal and Country	George Yates	4,167	53.2	−4.9
Labor	Francis French	3,658	46.8	+4.9
Liberal and Country hold		Swing	−4.9	

1950 Western Australian state election: South Perth
Party	Candidate	Votes	%	±%
Liberal and Country	George Yates	4,442	58.1	
Labor	Samuel Lynn	3,204	41.9	
Total formal votes		7,646	98.1	
Informal votes		147	1.9	
Turnout		7,793	91.7	
Liberal and Country hold		Swing		

=== Elections in the 1900s ===
1901 Western Australian state election: South Perth
Party	Candidate	Votes	%	±%
Ministerialist	William Gordon	258	28.4	+28.4
Opposition	Alfred Russell	226	24.9	+24.9
Independent	James Clydesdale	210	23.2	+23.2
Independent	Thomas Tate	164	18.1	+18.1
Opposition	Thomas Shafto	49	5.4	+5.4
Total formal votes		907	97.3	n/a
Informal votes		25	2.7	n/a
Turnout		932	42.4	n/a
Ministerialist win		(new seat)		
