= Electoral results for the district of Blackwood =

Western Australian district election results

This is a list of electoral results for the Electoral district of Blackwood in Western Australian state elections.

== Members for Blackwood ==
Member	Party	Term
John Hearman	Liberal Country League	1950–1968
Ron Kitney	Country	1968–1971
David Reid	Country	1971–1972
Sandy Lewis	Liberal	1972–1974

== Election results ==
=== Elections in the 1970s ===
1972 Blackwood state by-election
Party	Candidate	Votes	%	±%
Liberal	Sandy Lewis	2,023	39.5	+9.2
Labor	Fred Hebbard	1,642	32.0	+6.3
Country	Robert Wardell-Johnson	1,460	28.5	+2.6
Total formal votes		5,125	98.7	+3.7
Informal votes		67	1.3	−3.7
Turnout		5,192	86.6	−6.5
Two-party-preferred result
Liberal	Sandy Lewis	3,284	64.1	+25.7
Labor	Fred Hebbard	1,841	35.9	+35.9
Liberal gain from Country		Swing	N/A	

1971 Western Australian state election: Blackwood
Party	Candidate	Votes	%	±%
Liberal	Del Willmott	1,627	30.3	−15.1
Country	David Reid	1,392	25.9	−28.7
Labor	Col Sumner	1,382	25.7	+25.7
Independent	Peter Cracknell	559	10.4	+10.4
Democratic Labor	John Fleeton	417	7.8	+7.8
Total formal votes		5,377	95.0	−1.5
Informal votes		282	5.0	+1.5
Turnout		5,659	93.1	−0.6
Two-candidate-preferred result
Country	David Reid	3,314	61.6	+7.0
Liberal	Del Willmott	2,063	38.4	−7.0
Country hold		Swing	+7.0	

=== Elections in the 1960s ===
1968 Western Australian state election: Blackwood
Party	Candidate	Votes	%	±%
Country	Ron Kitney	2,798	54.6	
Liberal and Country	John Hearman	2,324	45.4	
Total formal votes		5,122	96.5	
Informal votes		184	3.5	
Turnout		5,306	93.7	
Country gain from Liberal and Country		Swing		

1965 Western Australian state election: Blackwood
Party	Candidate	Votes	%	±%
Liberal and Country	John Hearman	unopposed		
Liberal and Country hold		Swing		

1962 Western Australian state election: Blackwood
Party	Candidate	Votes	%	±%
Liberal and Country	John Hearman	3,549	74.1	
Independent	Henry Rudd	1,242	25.9	
Total formal votes		4,791	98.7	
Informal votes		65	1.3	
Turnout		4,856	94.1	
Liberal and Country hold		Swing		

=== Elections in the 1950s ===
1959 Western Australian state election: Blackwood
Party	Candidate	Votes	%	±%
Liberal and Country	John Hearman	2,239	50.8	−49.2
Country	Duncan Muir	2,168	49.2	+49.2
Total formal votes		4,407	97.6	
Informal votes		110	2.4	
Turnout		4,517	92.7	
Liberal and Country hold		Swing	N/A	

1956 Western Australian state election: Blackwood
Party	Candidate	Votes	%	±%
Liberal and Country	John Hearman	unopposed		
Liberal and Country hold		Swing		

1953 Western Australian state election: Blackwood
Party	Candidate	Votes	%	±%
Liberal and Country	John Hearman	unopposed		
Liberal and Country hold		Swing		

1950 Western Australian state election: Blackwood
Party	Candidate	Votes	%	±%
Liberal and Country	John Hearman	1,503	34.5	
Independent	John Smith	1,149	26.3	
Labor	William Eastcott	981	22.5	
Country	Alwyn Wagner	727	16.7	
Total formal votes		4,360	98.4	
Informal votes		69	1.6	
Turnout		4,429	92.6	
Two-candidate-preferred result
Liberal and Country	John Hearman	2,284	52.4	
Independent	John Smith	2,076	47.6	
Liberal and Country hold		Swing		
