= Electoral results for the district of Clontarf =

Western Australian district election results

This is a list of electoral results for the Electoral district of Clontarf in Western Australian state elections.

== Members for Clontarf ==
Member	Party	Term
Donald May	Labor	1968–1977
Tony Williams	Liberal	1977–1989

== Election results ==
=== Elections in the 1980s ===
1986 Western Australian state election: Clontarf
Party	Candidate	Votes	%	±%
Liberal	Tony Williams	8,538	58.1	+3.9
Labor	Kon Vatskalis	6,156	41.9	−3.9
Total formal votes		14,694	97.6	+0.1
Informal votes		357	2.4	−0.1
Turnout		15,051	91.5	+2.8
Liberal hold		Swing	+3.9	

1983 Western Australian state election: Clontarf
Party	Candidate	Votes	%	±%
Liberal	Tony Williams	7,670	54.2	
Labor	David Dale	6,473	45.8	
Total formal votes		14,143	97.5	
Informal votes		356	2.5	
Turnout		14,499	88.7	
Liberal hold		Swing		

1980 Western Australian state election: Clontarf
Party	Candidate	Votes	%	±%
Liberal	Tony Williams	8,052	53.9	−3.7
Labor	Robert Holland	6,887	46.1	+3.7
Total formal votes		14,939	96.8	+0.1
Informal votes		490	3.2	−0.1
Turnout		15,429	88.9	−3.5
Liberal hold		Swing	−3.7	

=== Elections in the 1970s ===
1977 Western Australian state election: Clontarf
Party	Candidate	Votes	%	±%
Liberal	Tony Williams	8,296	57.6	
Labor	Colin Puls	6,111	42.4	
Total formal votes		14,407	96.7	
Informal votes		490	3.3	
Turnout		14,897	92.4	
Liberal gain from Labor		Swing	+9.8	

1974 Western Australian state election: Clontarf
Party	Candidate	Votes	%	±%
Labor	Donald May	7,452	50.8	
Liberal	Tony Williams	6,168	42.0	
National Alliance	Anne-Marie Loney	1,056	7.2	
Total formal votes		14,676	97.2	
Informal votes		420	2.8	
Turnout		15,096	90.5	
Two-party-preferred result
Labor	Donald May	7,610	51.9	
Liberal	Tony Williams	7,066	48.1	
Labor hold		Swing		

1971 Western Australian state election: Clontarf
Party	Candidate	Votes	%	±%
Labor	Donald May	7,314	54.3	+4.2
Liberal	Malcolm Atwell	5,035	37.4	−4.5
Democratic Labor	Bill O'Grady	1,120	8.3	+2.9
Total formal votes		13,469	96.9	+0.9
Informal votes		432	3.1	−0.9
Turnout		13,901	91.8	+0.4
Two-party-preferred result
Labor	Donald May	7,482	55.5	+3.3
Liberal	Malcolm Atwell	5,987	44.5	−3.3
Labor hold		Swing	+3.3	

=== Elections in the 1960s ===
1968 Western Australian state election: Clontarf
Party	Candidate	Votes	%	±%
Labor	Donald May	5,613	50.1	
Liberal and Country	Paul Buddee	4,697	41.9	
Democratic Labor	John Martyr	604	5.4	
Independent	Ian Skipworth	284	2.5	
Total formal votes		11,198	96.0	
Informal votes		467	4.0	
Turnout		11,665	91.4	
Two-party-preferred result
Labor	Donald May	5,846	52.2	
Liberal and Country	Paul Buddee	5,352	47.8	
Labor gain from Liberal and Country		Swing		
