= Results of the 1968 Western Australian state election (Legislative Council) =

Western Australian state election, 23 March 1968 Legislative Council
| Enrolled voters | 208,417^{[1]} | | | | |
| Votes cast | 192,342 | | Turnout | 92.29% | +0.15% |
| Informal votes | 8,631 | | Informal | 4.49% | +0.22% |
Summary of votes by party
| Party | Primary votes | % | Swing | Seats | Change |
| Labor | 85,674 | 46.64% | | 6 | 10 |
| Liberal and Country | 67,977 | 37.00% | | 4 | 12 |
| Country | 21,228 | 11.56% | | 5 | 8 |
| Democratic Labor | 4,502 | 2.45% | | 0 | 0 |
| Independent | 4,330 | 2.36% | | 0 | 0 |
| Total | 183,711 | | | 15 | 30 |

This is a list of electoral region results for the Western Australian Legislative Council in the 1968 Western Australian state election.

== Results by electoral province ==
=== Central ===
1968 Western Australian state election: Central Province
| Party | Candidate | Votes | % | ±% |
|---|---|---|---|---|
| Country | Leslie Diver | unopposed | | |
| Country hold | | Swing | | |

=== Lower Central ===
1968 Western Australian state election: Lower Central Province
| Party | Candidate | Votes | % | ±% |
|---|---|---|---|---|
| Country | Sydney Thompson | 11,397 | 72.5 | |
| Labor | Alfred Jacobs | 4,330 | 27.5 | |
| Total formal votes | | 15,727 | 96.4 | |
| Informal votes | | 581 | 3.6 | |
| Turnout | | 16,308 | 93.6 | |
| Country hold | | Swing | | |

=== Lower North ===
1968 Western Australian state election: Lower North Province
| Party | Candidate | Votes | % | ±% |
|---|---|---|---|---|
| Liberal and Country | George Berry | 1,725 | 49.2 | |
| Labor | Eric Heenan | 1,629 | 46.5 | |
| Democratic Labor | Dennis Sands | 151 | 4.3 | |
| Total formal votes | | 3,505 | 96.7 | |
| Informal votes | | 119 | 3.3 | |
| Turnout | | 3,624 | 81.4 | |
Two-party-preferred result
| Liberal and Country | George Berry | 1,788 | 51.0 | |
| Labor | Eric Heenan | 1,717 | 49.0 | |
| Liberal and Country gain from Labor | | Swing | | |

=== Lower West ===
1968 Western Australian state election: Lower West Province
| Party | Candidate | Votes | % | ±% |
|---|---|---|---|---|
| Liberal and Country | Graham MacKinnon | unopposed | | |
| Liberal and Country hold | | Swing | | |

=== Metropolitan ===
1968 Western Australian state election: Metropolitan Province
| Party | Candidate | Votes | % | ±% |
|---|---|---|---|---|
| Liberal and Country | Ian Medcalf | unopposed | | |
| Liberal and Country hold | | Swing | | |

=== North ===
1968 Western Australian state election: North Province
| Party | Candidate | Votes | % | ±% |
|---|---|---|---|---|
| Labor | Harry Strickland | unopposed | | |
| Labor hold | | Swing | | |

=== North Metropolitan ===
1968 Western Australian state election: North Metropolitan Province
| Party | Candidate | Votes | % | ±% |
|---|---|---|---|---|
| Labor | Roy Claughton | 28,454 | 50.4 | |
| Liberal and Country | Herbert R. Robinson | 28,040 | 49.6 | |
| Total formal votes | | 56,494 | 95.5 | |
| Informal votes | | 2,662 | 4.5 | |
| Turnout | | 59,156 | 92.3 | |
| Labor gain from Liberal and Country | | Swing | | |

=== North-East Metropolitan ===
1968 Western Australian state election: North-East Metropolitan Province
| Party | Candidate | Votes | % | ±% |
|---|---|---|---|---|
| Labor | William Willesee | unopposed | | |
| Labor hold | | Swing | | |

=== South ===
1968 Western Australian state election: South Province
| Party | Candidate | Votes | % | ±% |
|---|---|---|---|---|
| Country | Jack Thomson | unopposed | | |
| Country hold | | Swing | | |

=== South-East ===
1968 Western Australian state election: South-East Province
| Party | Candidate | Votes | % | ±% |
|---|---|---|---|---|
| Labor | Claude Stubbs | unopposed | | |
| Labor hold | | Swing | | |

=== South Metropolitan ===
1968 Western Australian state election: South Metropolitan Province
| Party | Candidate | Votes | % | ±% |
|---|---|---|---|---|
| Labor | Ron Thompson | 26,670 | 59.0 | |
| Liberal and Country | Albert Gainsford-Brackley | 18,544 | 41.0 | |
| Total formal votes | | 45,214 | 95.5 | |
| Informal votes | | 2,114 | 4.5 | |
| Turnout | | 47,328 | 92.5 | |
| Labor hold | | Swing | | |

=== South-East Metropolitan ===
1968 Western Australian state election: South-East Metropolitan Province
| Party | Candidate | Votes | % | ±% |
|---|---|---|---|---|
| Labor | Jerry Dolan | 21,307 | 47.0 | |
| Liberal and Country | Nigel Guest | 19,668 | 43.4 | |
| Democratic Labor | Alan Crofts | 4,351 | 9.6 | |
| Total formal votes | | 45,326 | 95.8 | |
| Informal votes | | 1,984 | 4.2 | |
| Turnout | | 47,310 | 91.6 | |
Two-party-preferred result
| Labor | Jerry Dolan | 23,641 | 52.2 | |
| Liberal and Country | Nigel Guest | 21,685 | 47.8 | |
| Labor hold | | Swing | | |

=== South West ===
1968 Western Australian state election: South West Province
| Party | Candidate | Votes | % | ±% |
|---|---|---|---|---|
| Liberal and Country | Francis Willmott | unopposed | | |
| Liberal and Country hold | | Swing | | |

=== Upper West ===
1968 Western Australian state election: Upper West Province
| Party | Candidate | Votes | % | ±% |
|---|---|---|---|---|
| Country | Les Logan | unopposed | | |
| Country hold | | Swing | | |

=== West ===
1968 Western Australian state election: West Province
| Party | Candidate | Votes | % | ±% |
|---|---|---|---|---|
| Country | Fred White | 9,831 | 56.3 | |
| Labor | Owen Hanlon | 7,614 | 43.7 | |
| Total formal votes | | 17,445 | 93.7 | |
| Informal votes | | 1,171 | 6.3 | |
| Turnout | | 18,616 | 94.8 | |
| Country hold | | Swing | | |

== See also ==
- Results of the Western Australian state election, 1968 (Legislative Assembly)
- 1968 Western Australian state election
- Candidates of the 1968 Western Australian state election
- Members of the Western Australian Legislative Council, 1968–1971
