= Ross Elliott (journalist) =

Australian journalist and politician (1929–2000)

Member of the Legislative Assembly of Western Australia
- In office 20 February 1965 – 23 March 1968
- Preceded by: Don May
- Succeeded by: Tom Bateman
- Constituency: Canning

Personal details
- Born: 12 February 1929 Perth, Western Australia
- Died: 29 March 2000 (aged 71) Nedlands, Western Australia
- Party: Liberal

Ross Mewburn Elliott (12 February 1929 – 29 March 2000) was an Australian journalist and politician. He was a Liberal Party member of the Legislative Assembly of Western Australia from 1965 to 1968, representing the seat of Canning.

Elliott was born in Perth, and attended Hale School. In his youth, he was a talented Australian rules footballer, playing two matches for West Perth during the 1949 WANFL season. In the 1950s, Elliott ran a sporting goods store in Bunbury. He first ventured into journalism as a writer for the Bunbury-based South-West Times, and in 1959 moved back to Perth to work as chief sports writer for the Daily News. He also served as a television panellist for TVW and a radio commentator for 6PM. Elliott had four children, Scott, Margot, Robin and Geoff. Geoff Elliott also had a career in journalism, starting as a cadet at The West Australian before a 15-year career at The Australian, where he was Washington correspondent (2005–2009) and Business Editor. He is now Joint Managing Partner at government and media relations firm GRACosway.

A member of the Liberal Party since 1948, Elliott ran for parliament at the 1965 state election, narrowly defeating the sitting Labor member, Don May, in the seat of Canning. However, his time in parliament was short-lived, as he lost his seat at the 1968 election. The Labor candidate, Tom Bateman, won with 50.5 percent of the two-party-preferred vote. Elliott subsequently resumed his journalism career, serving as corporate manager of the Golden West Network from 1975 to 1980, as well as in a variety of other roles. A founder of the West Australian Football Register, he was posthumously inducted into the West Australian Football Hall of Fame in 2004.

Parliament of Western Australia
Preceded by Don May	Member for Canning; 1965–1968	Succeeded by Tom Bateman
