= Tonkin shadow ministry =

Shadow cabinet of Western Australia

The Tonkin shadow ministry was a Shadow Cabinet led by the Opposition Leader and leader of the Labor Party, John Tonkin, in the Parliament of Western Australia. While serving no formal status—only the Leader and Deputy Leader received remuneration for their role over and above that of a Member of Parliament—it was intended to improve the effectiveness of the Opposition by providing an alternative Ministry to voters, consisting of shadow ministers who could ask role-specific questions in parliament, provide comment to the media and offer alternative policies to the government in their areas of responsibility.

The Tonkin shadow ministry was the first of its kind in Western Australia, and existed from March 1974, after Labor's defeat at the 1974 state election, until 15 April 1976 when Tonkin stepped down at the age of 74. It was followed by the Jamieson shadow ministry.

The governing Ministries at the time were the Court–McPharlin Ministry and the first Court Ministry.

== The Shadow Ministry ==
The following members of Parliament were members of the shadow ministry:

Office	Minister
Leader of the Opposition; Shadow Treasurer; Shadow Minister Co-ordinating Economic and Regional Development	John Tonkin, Dip.Tchg., FAIA, MLA
Deputy Leader Shadow Minister for Public Works; Shadow Minister for Water Supplies; Shadow Minister for Housing	Colin Jamieson, MLA
Shadow Minister for Education; Shadow Minister for Cultural Affairs; Shadow Minister for Recreation	Tom Evans, LL.B., MLA
Shadow Minister for Agriculture	David Evans, BA, MLA
Shadow Minister for Local Government; Shadow Minister for Urban Development and Town Planning	Don Taylor, BA, DipEd, MLA
Shadow Minister for Industrial Development; Shadow Minister for Electricity; Shadow Minister for Mines; Shadow Minister for Fuel and Energy	Donald May, MLA
Shadow Minister for Health; Shadow Minister for Community Welfare	Ron Davies, MLA
Shadow Minister for Labour and Industry; Shadow Minister for Consumer Affairs; Shadow Minister for Immigration; Shadow Minister for Tourism	John Harman, MLA
Shadow Attorney-General	Ron Bertram, LL.B., Dip.Acctg., AASA, MLA
Shadow Minister for Police; Shadow Minister for Transport; Shadow Minister for Traffic Safety	Tom Jones, MLA
Shadow Minister for Lands Shadow Minister for Forests; Shadow Minister for the North-West	Mal Bryce, BA, MLA
Shadow Chief Secretary; Shadow Minister for Conservation and the Environment; Shadow Minister for Fisheries and Fauna	Terry Burke, MLA
Leader of the Opposition in the Legislative Council	Ronald Thompson, MLC
