= Municipality of Collie =

Former local authority in Western Australia

The Municipality of Collie was a local government area in Western Australia, centred on the town of Collie. It covered an area of 1,170 acres in the Collie and Worsley townsites in 1950.

It was established on 17 May 1901, separating the town of Collie from the surrounding Collie Road District, which had been established a year earlier. The process of establishing the new municipality had been fraught: local residents had been divided regarding the municipality, with public meetings being held for and against the move, and then initial proclamations in January and again in early May were found to be invalid due to technical errors, resulting in its formal establishment being delayed until mid-May. The first election was finally held on 27 July 1901, with J. C. Coombes becoming the first mayor.

The municipal council consisted of nine councillors elected at large and a directly elected mayor. The new municipality assumed the functions of the Collie Coalfields Local Board of Health, which had existed since 1897, and initially met at the health board's offices. It soon negotiated space for a council chambers in the Collie Mechanics' Institute building. The municipality built permanent municipal buildings on the corner of Throssell Street and Steere Street in 1907, consisting of a two-storey building with three shops facing the street, two sitting rooms at the rear, and the council chamber, mayor's office, town clerk's office and other offices on the first floor. The buildings were demolished during the 1970s to make way for the current Shire of Collie Council Chambers.

It ceased to exist on 2 March 1951, when it merged with the Collie Road District to form the Collie Coalfields Road District following a report from the secretary of the Department of Local Government recommending amalgamation. The recommendation was supported by a "large majority" of ratepayers at a public meeting in November 1950. The municipality had been financially struggling, running a substantial deficit in the previous year and being unable to afford to carry out needed maintenance and construction work and facing criticism over the state of council services. The former municipality became the seven-member Town Ward of the thirteen-member amalgamated council.

Herbert Wells served as mayor of the council, while George Henderson served as a councillor.
