= James Dimmitt =

Australian politician

Member of the Legislative Council of Western Australia
- In office 22 May 1938 – 13 April 1953
- Preceded by: Alec Clydesdale
- Succeeded by: Arthur Griffith
- Constituency: Metropolitan-Suburban

Personal details
- Born: 21 June 1888 Richmond, Victoria, Australia
- Died: 29 January 1957 (aged 68) London, England
- Party: Liberal

James Albert Dimmitt (21 June 1888 – 29 January 1957) was an Australian politician who was a Liberal Party member of the Legislative Council of Western Australia from 1938 to 1953. He later served as Agent-General for Western Australia from 1953 until his death.

Dimmitt was born in Melbourne, and arrived in Western Australia in 1911, where he began working as a salesman. He eventually became a company director, serving on the boards of a wide variety of companies, including a match company, an insurance company, a coal-mining firm, and an airline (West Australian Airways). His own company, Armstrong Dimmitt Ltd., sold motor vehicle parts and accessories. Dimmitt was elected to parliament in 1938, representing Metropolitan-Suburban Province. He was appointed chairman of committees in the Legislative Council in 1946, replacing James Cornell. In 1953, the Liberal government of Ross McLarty appointed Dimmitt to the position of agent-general (the government's representative in London), which meant he had to resign from parliament. He served until his death in January 1957.
