= Collie Road District =

Local government area in Western Australia

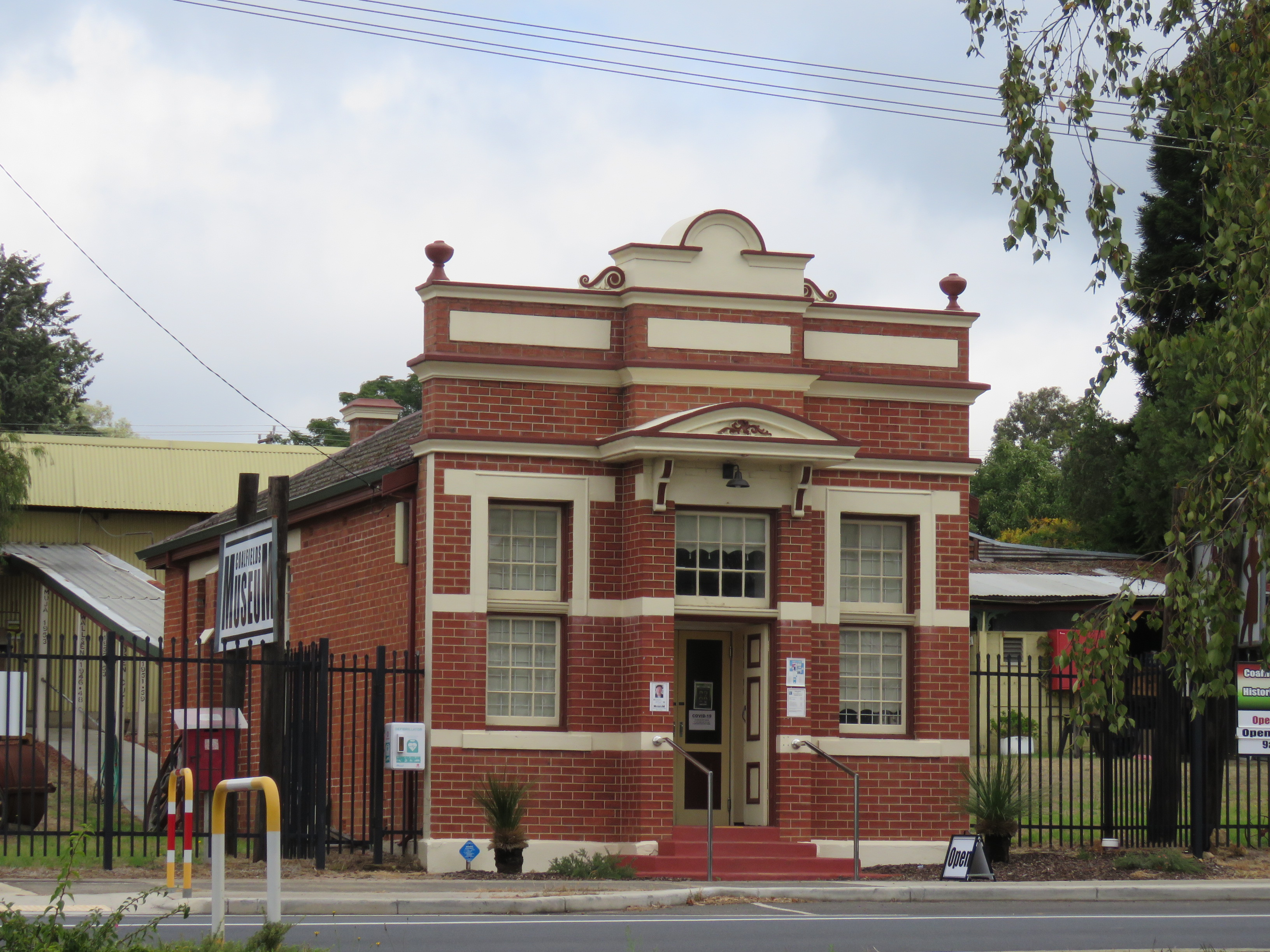
The former Roads Board Office in Collie in April 2022

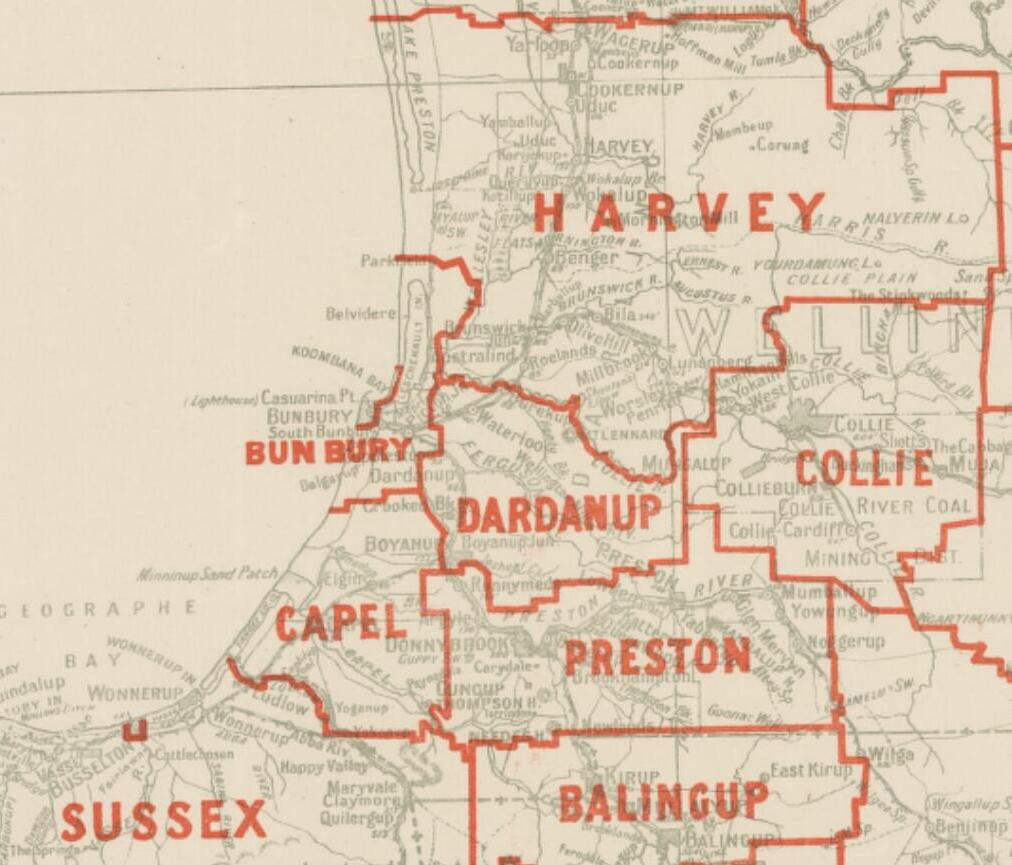
Collie and surrounding road districts, 1935

The Collie Road District was an early form of local government area in the Collie region of Western Australia.

It was established on 26 January 1900, separating the area in and around the town of Collie from the Dardanup and Brunswick Road Districts. The township of Collie separated from the new road district as the Municipality of Collie on 17 May 1900.

The road board built permanent offices in Throssell Street, Collie in 1905–06, holding their first meeting in the new offices in August 1906. The 1906 office was replaced in 1930 with a new building constructed in front of the old one, opening in September 1930. The 1930 building is now used as the Collie Museum.

The Western Mail wrote in 1930: "To the west of the municipality the boundary of the road board extends about six miles; to the north and south its boundaries are nine miles from the town; and the most distant point is 12 miles to the eat. Four timber mills and six coalmines are within its confines. These mines and mills contribute more than half of the board’s revenue". At its abolition in 1950, the road district was described as consisting of 238,000 acres, including 10,000 acres of townsites, 20,000 acres of freehold land owned by a timber company, 22,000 acres of mining leases, 30,000 acres of farming lands and a substantial area held by the Forestry Department in reserve.

It ceased to exist on 2 March 1951, when it amalgamated with the Municipality of Collie to form the Collie Coalfields Road District. The amalgamation followed a report by the secretary to the Department of Local Government recommending that outcome. The road board endorsed the report's outcome as "satisfactory". The road district became the west, south and northwards of the new district, each electing two members out of the 14-member board.

John Ewing and Herbert Wells both served as chairmen of the road board.
