= Herbert Wells (politician) =

Australian politician (1872–1960)

Member of the Legislative Assembly of Western Australia
- In office 12 April 1930 – 8 April 1933
- Preceded by: Alec Clydesdale
- Succeeded by: Charles Cross
- Constituency: Canning

Personal details
- Born: 9 October 1872 Durham Lead, Victoria, Australia
- Died: 9 November 1960 (aged 88) South Perth, Western Australia, Australia
- Party: Nationalist

Herbert Edward Wells (9 October 1872 – 9 November 1960) was an Australian politician who was a member of the Legislative Assembly of Western Australia from 1930 to 1933, representing the seat of Canning. He was a perennial candidate, standing for parliament unsuccessfully on another six occasions.

== Early life ==
Wells was born in Ballarat, Victoria, to Mary (née Murray) and James Wells. He arrived in Western Australia in 1895 and subsequently lived for periods in Fremantle, Coolgardie, and Leonora. He moved to Collie in 1899, where he worked as a bootmaker and later as an auctioneer. Wells was soon elected to both of the local government bodies in the area – to the Collie Road Board in 1900 and to the Collie Municipal Council in 1901. He chaired the road board for a period, and was mayor of Collie from 1908 to 1909 and again from 1911 to 1913. Wells enlisted in the Australian Imperial Force in 1916 and served as an officer in the 44th and 63rd Battalions during the war. He moved to Perth after being discharged.

== Politics and later life ==
Wells first stood for parliament at the 1914 state election, running for the Liberal Party in the seat of Collie. He lost to Labor's Arthur Wilson by a large margin. At the 1927 state election, Wells ran for the Nationalists in the seat of Canning, losing to Alec Clydesdale. He reprised his candidacy in 1930, beating Clydesdale by just 92 votes, but Labor reclaimed the seat in 1933. At the 1936 election, Wells made an unsuccessful attempt to reclaim Canning. He ran for the seat of East Perth at the 1939 election, claiming only 7.8 percent of the vote as an "independent Nationalist". His seventh and final run for parliament came at a 1941 Legislative Council by-election for Metropolitan Province, where he lost to James Hislop. Wells died in Perth in November 1960, aged 88. He had married Philippa Bayley in 1900, with whom he had four children.

== See also ==
- Members of the Western Australian Legislative Assembly

Parliament of Western Australia
Preceded by Alec Clydesdale	Member for Canning; 1930–1933	Succeeded by Charles Cross
