= Alec Clydesdale =

Australian politician (1875–1947)

The Honourable Alec Clydesdale MBE
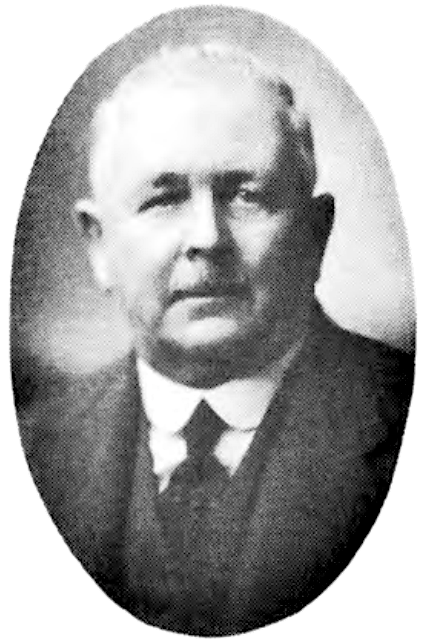

Member of the Legislative Assembly of Western Australia
- In office 12 March 1921 – 12 April 1930
- Preceded by: Robert Robinson
- Succeeded by: Herbert Wells
- Constituency: Canning

Member of the Legislative Council of Western Australia
- In office 22 May 1932 – 21 May 1938
- Preceded by: Sir William Lathlain
- Succeeded by: James Dimmitt
- Constituency: Metropolitan-Suburban Province

Personal details
- Born: 16 July 1875 Ballarat, Victoria, Australia
- Died: 24 January 1947 (aged 71) Perth, Western Australia, Australia
- Party: Labor

Alexander McAllister Clydesdale MBE (16 July 1875 – 24 January 1947) was an Australian politician who served in both houses of the Parliament of Western Australia, as a member of the Legislative Assembly from 1921 to 1930 and as a member of the Legislative Council from 1932 to 1938.

Clydesdale was born in Ballarat, Victoria, to Kate (née Glenn) and James Robert Clydesdale. He was articled to an architect for a period and then trained as a plumber. In 1894, during the gold rush, Clydesdale left for Western Australia, living first in Cue and later in Mount Magnet. He was elected to the Mount Magnet Municipal Council in 1899, aged only 24, and was later elected mayor. At the time of his election, he was believed to be the youngest mayor in the state. At the 1901 state election, Clydesdale contested the seat of Mount Magnet as a Ministerialist (a supporter of the government of George Throssell), but was defeated by Frank Wallace.

In 1903, Clydesdale moved to Perth. He became involved with horse racing, serving as secretary of two racing clubs, and eventually came to own racecourses in Belmont, Bicton, and Kensington. Clydesdale was elected mayor of the South Perth Municipality in 1913, and would serve until 1921. In 1920, he was made a Member of the Order of the British Empire (MBE), for services to the war effort. At the 1921 state election, Clydesdale contested the seat of Canning for the Labor Party, defeating Robert Robinson of the Nationalist Party (a former attorney-general).

Clydesdale was re-elected at the 1924 and 1927 state elections, but was defeated by Nationalist candidate Herbert Wells at the 1930 election. He re-entered parliament at the 1932 Legislative Council election, defeating Sir William Lathlain in Metropolitan-Suburban Province. In 1933, Clydesdale was appointed chairman of the State Lotteries Commission, but he had to resign the position the following year over a perceived conflict of interest. Clydesdale was defeated by James Dimmitt at the 1938 election, and was subsequently re-appointed to the Lotteries Commission. He died in Perth in January 1947, aged 71. Clydesdale had married twice, to May Smith in 1902, with whom he had three children, and to Lilian Knights in 1942.

Parliament of Western Australia
Preceded by Robert Robinson	Member for Canning; 1921–1930	Succeeded by Herbert Wells
