= Tony Williams (politician) =

Australian politician (1928–2012)

Member of the Legislative Assembly of Western Australia
- In office 19 February 1977 – 4 February 1989
- Preceded by: Don May
- Succeeded by: None (abolished)
- Constituency: Clontarf

Personal details
- Born: 9 August 1928 Mount Lawley, Western Australia
- Died: 19 May 2012 (aged 83) Salter Point, Western Australia
- Party: Liberal

Rex Geoffrey "Tony" Williams (9 August 1928 – 19 May 2012) was an Australian politician who was a Liberal Party member of the Legislative Assembly of Western Australia from 1977 to 1989, representing the seat of Clontarf.

Williams was born in Perth to Thelma (née Flanders) and William Bartle Williams. He attended Wesley College, and subsequently worked as a clerk. He eventually came to run his own business, and in October 1972 was also elected to the Swan Shire Council, where he would serve until May 1978. A member of the Liberal Party since 1947, Williams entered parliament at the 1977 state election, winning the seat of Clontarf from the Labor Party. He was re-elected at three subsequent state elections (in 1980, 1983 and 1986), and from 1983 to 1988 served as a Liberal Party whip in the Legislative Assembly. Williams left parliament at the 1989 election, which coincided with the abolition of his seat in a redistribution. He died in Perth in May 2012, aged 84.

Parliament of Western Australia
Preceded by Don May	Member for Clontarf; 1977–1989	Abolished
