= Robert Thomson Robinson =

Australian politician (1867–1926)

The Honourable Robert Robinson KC
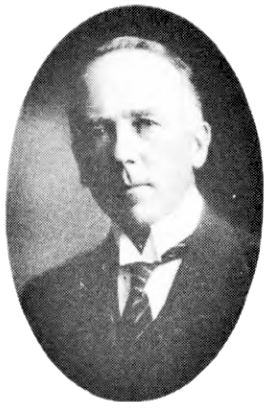

Attorney-General of Western Australia
- In office 27 July 1916 – 17 May 1919
- Preceded by: Thomas Walker
- Succeeded by: Thomas Draper

Member of the Legislative Assembly of Western Australia
- In office 21 October 1914 – 12 March 1921
- Preceded by: Charles Lewis
- Succeeded by: Alec Clydesdale
- Constituency: Canning

Personal details
- Born: 18 January 1867 Ballybay, County Monaghan, Ireland
- Died: 19 September 1926 (aged 59) Mount Lawley, Western Australia
- Party: Liberal (to 1917); Nationalist (from 1917)

Robert Thomson Robinson (18 January 1867 – 19 September 1926) was an Australian lawyer and politician who was a member of the Legislative Assembly of Western Australia from 1914 to 1921, representing the seat of Canning. He served as a minister in the governments of Frank Wilson, Henry Lefroy, Hal Colebatch, and James Mitchell.

== Early life ==
Robinson was born in Ballybay, County Monaghan, Ireland, to Margaret (née Thomson) and John Robinson. His family moved to Victoria in 1873, where his younger brother, Herbert Robinson, was born, and then to Albany, Western Australia, in June 1878. Robinson and his brother were both sent to Adelaide to be educated, attending Prince Alfred College. Entering the legal profession, he was articled to Edward Hare of Albany and Septimus Burt of Perth, eventually becoming an associate to Sir Alexander Onslow, the Chief Justice of Western Australia. Called to the bar in 1889, Robinson returned to Albany in 1897 to go into partnership with Samuel Johnson Haynes, with their firm eventually becoming known as Hayes, Robinson, and Cox. He was made King's Counsel in 1914.

== Politics ==
In 1908, Robinson was elected to the Perth Road Board (now the City of Stirling). He would serve as a councillor until his death. At the 1914 state election, Robinson contested the seat of Canning as a Liberal candidate, defeating the sitting member, Labor's Charles Lewis, and the former member for Swan, Arthur Gull. He was elevated to the ministry in July 1916, when Frank Wilson replaced John Scaddan as premier, and was named Attorney-General and Minister for Mines. When the Wilson government fell in June 1917, Robinson retained the attorney-generalship in the new ministry led by Henry Lefroy, and was also made Minister for Woods and Forests and Minister for Industries, although he was replaced as Minister for Mines by John Scaddan. He also switched to the newly formed Nationalist Party.

The Lefroy government fell in April 1919, with Robinson serving as Attorney-General, Minister for Forests, and Minister for Mines in the short-lived ministry led by Hal Colebatch. When that fell one month later, he retained the forests and mines portfolios in the new Mitchell government, but was replaced as Attorney-General by Thomas Draper. Robinson resigned from the ministry just after one month later, following disagreements with Mitchell. He remained in parliament until his defeat at the 1921 state election, losing Canning to Labor's Alec Clydesdale. At the 1924 election, Robinson unsuccessfully contested the seat of Albany, which had earlier been held by his brother.

== Later life ==
Robinson died of heart disease in September 1926, and was buried at Karrakatta Cemetery. He was married three times, firstly in 1890 to Ellen Francisco, with whom he had five daughters. They divorced in 1902, and Robinson remarried the following year to Winifred Corless. They had no children together, and he was widowed in 1908. His third marriage, which lasted until his death, was to Elizabeth Hedges, with whom he had three sons and four daughters.

Parliament of Western Australia
Preceded by Charles Lewis	Member for Canning; 1914–1921	Succeeded by Alec Clydesdale
Political offices
Preceded by Thomas Walker	Attorney-General; 1916–1919	Succeeded by Thomas Draper
Preceded by Philip Collier; Charles Hudson	Minister for Mines; 1916–1917; 1919	Succeeded by John Scaddan; John Scaddan
Preceded by James Mitchell	Minister for Industries; 1917–1919	Succeeded by John Scaddan
New creation	Minister for Woods and Forests; 1917–1919	Succeeded by John Scaddan
