= Charles Lewis (Australian politician) =

Australian politician

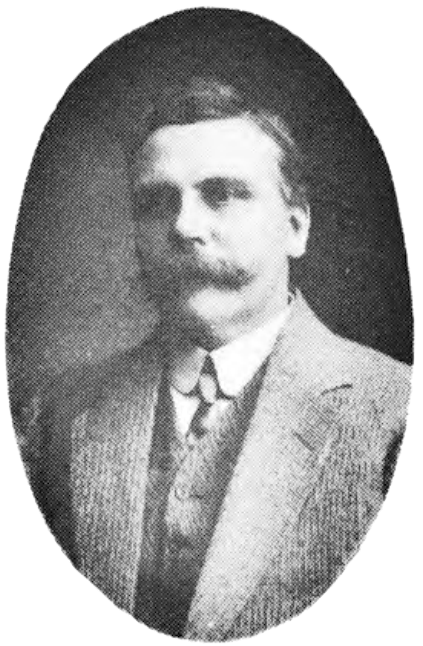

Member of the Legislative Assembly of Western Australia
- In office 3 October 1911 – 21 October 1914
- Preceded by: William Gordon
- Succeeded by: Robert Robinson
- Constituency: Canning

Personal details
- Born: 7 August 1870 Geelong, Victoria, Australia
- Died: 21 November 1935 (aged 65) Maylands, Western Australia, Australia
- Party: Labor

Charles Joseph Moore Lewis (7 August 1870 – 21 November 1935) was an Australian politician who was a Labor Party member of the Legislative Assembly of Western Australia from 1911 to 1914, representing the seat of Canning.

Lewis was born in Geelong, Victoria, to Sarah Ann (née Osbourne) and Alfred James Moore Lewis. Living in Bendigo and Melbourne for periods, he worked at various times as a grocer's assistant, farrier, coach-builder, and tram conductor. In 1896, Lewis went to Western Australia, where he initially worked in a foundry. He later found work with Western Australian Government Railways, and rose to the position of stationmaster. Lewis was prominent within the Amalgamated Society of Railway Employees, serving at various points as chairman of the Perth branch and secretary of the state branch. At the 1911 state election, he contested and won the seat of Canning for the Labor Party, defeating the sitting member, William Gordon. However, his time in parliament was short-lived, as he was defeated by the Liberal Party candidate, Robert Robinson, at the 1914 election. Lewis died in November 1935, aged 65, at which point he was living in Maylands. He had married Clara Hillier in 1902, with whom he had eight children.

Parliament of Western Australia
Preceded by William Gordon	Member for Canning; 1911–1914	Succeeded by Robert Robinson
