= Geoff Baker (politician) =

Australian politician

Geoff Baker MLA

Member of the Western Australian Legislative Assembly for South Perth
- Incumbent
- Assumed office 13 March 2021
- Preceded by: John McGrath

Personal details
- Born: 28 July 1969 (age 57) Ontario, Canada
- Party: Labor

Geoffrey Baker (born 28 July 1969) is a member of the Western Australian Legislative Assembly for the electoral district of South Perth for the Australian Labor Party. He won his seat at the 2021 Western Australian state election.

He attended school at Wesley College in South Perth.

Western Australian Legislative Assembly
Preceded by John McGrath	Member for South Perth; 2021–present	Incumbent
