= Charles Cross (Australian politician) =

Australian politician (1891–1955)

Member of the Legislative Assembly of Western Australia
- In office 8 April 1933 – 15 March 1947
- Preceded by: Herbert Wells
- Succeeded by: George Yates
- Constituency: Canning

Personal details
- Born: 29 October 1891 March, Cambridgeshire, England
- Died: 26 October 1955 (aged 63) Perth, Western Australia, Australia
- Party: Labor

Charles Cross (29 October 1891 – 26 October 1955) was an Australian trade unionist and politician who was a Labor Party member of the Legislative Assembly of Western Australia from 1933 to 1947, representing the seat of Canning.

Cross was born in March, Cambridgeshire, England, to Jane (née Bridgestock) and George Cross. He came to Western Australia as a child. After leaving school, Cross farmed at Wagin and Katanning for periods. He attempted to enlist in the military in 1915, but was rejected for service and instead began working as a conductor for Perth Electric Tramways. Cross eventually became an official of the Tramway Employees' Union. He entered parliament in the Labor landslide at the 1933 state election, defeating Herbert Wells of the Nationalist Party.

Cross was re-elected on three more occasions, though never with a comfortable majority, and lost his seat to George Yates at the 1947 election. In 1950, he unsuccessfully ran against the sitting premier, Sir Ross McLarty, in the seat of Murray. In 1955, Cross stood for Labor preselection in the seat of Beeloo for 1956 state election, but lost to Colin Jamieson. He was killed in a level crossing accident later in the year, at the age of 63. Cross had been married twice, firstly to Ruth Naomi Ayres in 1916, with whom he had two children. He was widowed in 1944, and remarried in 1947 to Fifi Marie Anderson.

Parliament of Western Australia
Preceded by Herbert Wells	Member for Canning; 1933–1947	Succeeded by George Yates
