= John McGrath (Western Australian politician) =

Australian politician

Member of the Western Australian Parliament for South Perth
- In office 26 February 2005 – 29 January 2021
- Preceded by: Phillip Pendal
- Succeeded by: Geoff Baker

Personal details
- Born: John Edwin McGrath; 17 June 1947 (age 79) Fremantle, Western Australia
- Citizenship: Australian
- Party: Liberal Party
- Occupation: Journalist

John Edwin McGrath (born 17 June 1947 in Fremantle, Western Australia) is a Western Australian politician and was the Liberal member for the electorate of South Perth in the Western Australian Legislative Assembly since the 2005 election.

Before entering Parliament McGrath was a journalist and held several positions including sports editor, chief football writer and bureau chief in Melbourne covering sport for The West Australian. McGrath was elected with a swing of 14.2 points following the retirement of Phillip Pendal and holds the seat by a margin of 5.8 points, he was appointed the opposition spokesperson on Seniors, Racing and Gaming and Liquor licensing in 2005 and in 2008 was appointed as Shadow Minister of Road Safety and Housing and Works.

In 2008, McGrath was cleared by the Corruption and Crime Commission in relation to dealings with lobbyist Brian Burke. Burke approached McGrath in order to move a parliamentary motion that Burke had prepared, but the CCC cleared the charges on the grounds that McGrath had no knowledge of Burke's commercial interest in the matter.

McGrath was appointed Government Whip following the 2008 election. McGrath retired at the 2021 election.

Western Australian Legislative Assembly
Preceded by Phillip Pendal	Member for South Perth; 2005–2021	Succeeded by Geoff Baker
