= John Hearman =

Australian politician (1910–1994)

The Honourable John Hearman CMG

17th Speaker of the Legislative Assembly of Western Australia
- In office 30 June 1959 – 23 March 1968
- Preceded by: James Hegney
- Succeeded by: Hugh Guthrie

Member of the Legislative Assembly of Western Australia
- In office 25 March 1950 – 23 March 1968
- Preceded by: None (new creation)
- Succeeded by: Ron Kitney
- Constituency: Blackwood

Personal details
- Born: 10 November 1910 Mortlake, Surrey, England
- Died: 20 February 1994 (aged 83) Western Australia
- Party: Liberal

John Merrifield Hearman CMG (10 November 1910 – 20 February 1994) was an Australian politician who was a Liberal Party member of the Legislative Assembly of Western Australia from 1950 to 1968, representing the seat of Blackwood. He served as Speaker of the Legislative Assembly from 1959 to 1968, with only Sir James Lee-Steere having served in the position longer.

== Early life ==
Hearman was born in Surrey, England, to Minnie (née Merrifield) and Walter Edgar Hearman. His family moved to Western Australia when he was three years old, settling in Donnybrook. His older sister, Joan Tully, became a prominent agricultural scientist. Attending Guildford Grammar School, Hearman was a talented rower in his youth and represented Western Australia at the 1930 King's Cup (the Australian national championships).

In 1939, Hearman enlisted in the Australian Army, where he was initially attached to the 2/16th Battalion as a platoon commander and machine gunner. Hearman saw service in the Middle East, New Guinea, Borneo, and the Celebes, and was mentioned in dispatches during the Kokoda Campaign. He reach the rank of major by the war's end and was briefly attached to the British Indian Army in 1946, as an officer in the 80th Infantry Brigade. Hearman was discharged in March 1946, and returned to his dairy farm.

== Politics and later life ==
A member of the Liberal Party from 1946, Hearman was elected to parliament at the 1950 state election, for the new seat of Blackwood. He was appointed deputy chairman of committees in 1957, and after the Liberals' victory at the 1959 election was elected to the speakership. Hearman was re-elected in Blackwood with a large majority in 1962, and unopposed in 1965. He remained speaker until the 1968 election, when he was unexpectedly defeated in his own seat (despite the return of the Liberal government for a third term). Ron Kitney of the Country Party was his only opponent, and polled 54.6 percent of the vote.

Hearman was the first sitting speaker since Timothy Quinlan in 1911 to be defeated at a general election. He served as speaker for just under nine years, with only Sir James Lee-Steere having served in the position longer. Hearman returned to his farm after leaving politics, and died in Donnybrook in February 1994, aged 83. He had married Millicent Jean Hardie in 1943, with whom he had two sons and two daughters.

== See also ==
- Members of the Western Australian Legislative Assembly

Parliament of Western Australia
New creation	Member for Blackwood; 1950–1968	Succeeded by Ron Kitney
Preceded by James Hegney	Speaker of the Legislative Assembly; 1959–1968	Succeeded by Hugh Guthrie
