= David Reid (politician) =

Australian politician

David Reid OAM
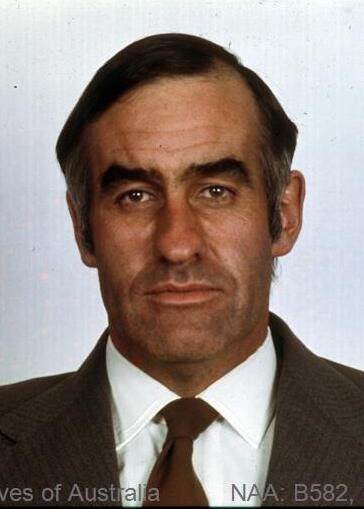

Senator for Western Australia
- In office 16 January 1974 – 11 April 1974
- Preceded by: Edgar Prowse

Personal details
- Born: 10 May 1933 Bridgetown, Western Australia, Australia
- Died: 27 October 2017 (aged 84) Busselton, Western Australia
- Party: Country Party
- Spouse: Jacynth Horley
- Profession: Farmer

David Donald Reid OAM (10 May 1933 – 27 October 2017) was an Australian politician. He briefly served as a member of the Western Australian Legislative Assembly in 1971–1972 representing the seat of Blackwood, then in 1974 was appointed to the Australian Senate to serve out a vacancy which ended the same year.

== Biography ==
Reid was born in Bridgetown in the South West region of Western Australia to Donald Reid, a primary producer, and Marion (née Davies). He was educated at Bridgetown Primary School and Denmark Agricultural College, before getting a Diploma in Agriculture as an external student at Muresk College (now part of Curtin University). After completing his schooling, he farmed at Bridgetown and did national service with the Army. On 19 October 1957 at St Mary's Church in West Perth, he married Jacynth Horley, with whom he was to have one son and two daughters. In 1970, he became state president of the WA Fruitgrowers' Association and deputy WA representative on the Apple and Pear Board.

Reid contested the seat of Blackwood in the Western Australian Legislative Assembly for the Country Party, of which he had been a member since 1965, at the 1971 election, and won with a 7% swing to his party against the Liberals, who had held the seat from 1950 until 1968. He resigned on 26 October 1972 to unsuccessfully contest the House of Representatives seat of Forrest at the December 1972 election, causing a by-election in the seat which was won by the Liberals' Sandy Lewis. While his bid to transfer to federal politics came up short, his preferences flowed overwhelmingly to Liberal challenger Peter Drummond, allowing Drummond to unseat Labor incumbent Frank Kirwan despite Labor's first national victory in 23 years.

On 16 January 1974, he was appointed to the Australian Senate as a Country Party Senator for Western Australia, filling the casual vacancy caused by the retirement of Senator Edgar Prowse. From 7 March until 11 April, he was a member of the Joint Committee on Prices. He contested the 1974 election three months later as a National Alliance candidate (the Alliance had been formed between the Western Australian Country Party and the WA branch of the Democratic Labor Party), but he was defeated. Reid served as state president of the party, renamed the National Country Party soon after the election, during 1974 and 1975. He left the party in 1978.

In the 1980s, he became heavily involved with promotion of the Bridgetown region, with a four-year stint as president of the Bridgetown-Greenbushes Tourist Bureau. He became involved with the South West Development Authority, one of several regional authorities set up by the Burke government. From 1984 until 1990, he served as deputy chairman of the Advisory Committee and convenor of the Economic Development subcommittee of the Authority. In 1987, he was elected to the Shire of Bridgetown-Greenbushes as a councillor, and from 1990 as Shire President. He was also president of the Bridgetown Rotary Club, director for 5 years of the Blackwood Marathon Relay, and a member of the Bridgetown Hospital Board and Bridgetown Golf Club.
