= George Yates (Western Australian politician) =

Australian politician

Member of the Legislative Assembly of Western Australia
- In office 15 March 1947 – 25 March 1950
- Preceded by: Charles Cross
- Succeeded by: Arthur Griffith
- Constituency: Canning
- In office 25 March 1950 – 7 April 1956
- Preceded by: None (new seat)
- Succeeded by: Bill Grayden
- Constituency: South Perth

Personal details
- Born: 27 July 1908 West Leederville, Western Australia, Australia
- Died: 3 October 1998 (aged 90) Sydney, New South Wales, Australia
- Party: Liberal

George Henry Yates (27 July 1908 – 3 October 1998) was an Australian businessman and politician who was a Liberal Party member of the Legislative Assembly of Western Australia from 1947 to 1956.

Yates was born in Perth to Sarah Ann (née Hill) and Henry Yates. He studied at Perth Technical College, and after leaving school worked variously as a photographer's assistant, mechanic's assistant, and car salesman. Yates joined the Citizens Military Forces in the 1920s, and in 1940 enlisted in the Australian Imperial Force. He served with the 2/28th Battalion in North Africa and New Guinea, beginning the war as a quartermaster and finishing with the rank of captain. After the war's end, Yates opened a grocery business.

At the 1947 state election, Yates was elected to the seat of Canning, defeating Labor's Charles Cross. He switched to the new seat of South Perth at the 1950 election, and was re-elected in 1953. Yates left parliament at the 1956 election and moved to Sydney, where he managed The Riverview Hotel, Balmain, for several years. He later worked for the Long Distance Road Transport Association, initially as secretary and then as executive director. Yates retired in 1975, and died in Sydney in 1998, aged 90. He had been married twice, firstly to Viola Beatrice Lathby (née Terrell) in 1928, with whom he had two daughters. He was divorced in 1960, and remarried the following year to Norma Joan Haines.

Parliament of Western Australia
Preceded by Charles Cross	Member for Canning; 1947–1950	Succeeded by Arthur Griffith
New seat	Member for South Perth; 1950–1956	Succeeded by Bill Grayden
