= William Gordon (Australian politician) =

Australian politician

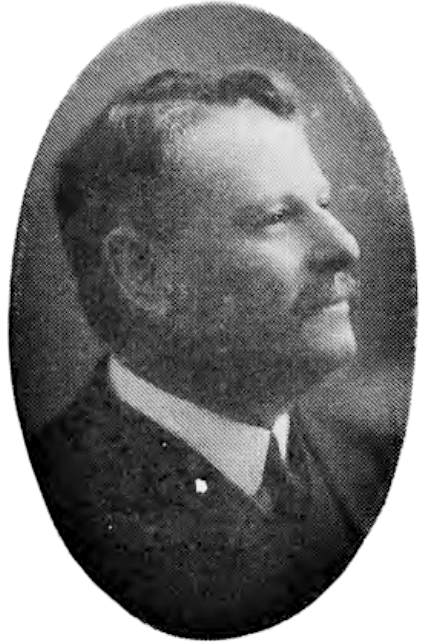

Member of the Legislative Assembly of Western Australia
- In office 24 April 1901 – 28 June 1904
- Preceded by: None (new seat)
- Succeeded by: None (abolished)
- Constituency: South Perth
- In office 28 June 1904 – 3 October 1911
- Preceded by: None (new seat)
- Succeeded by: Charles Lewis
- Constituency: Canning

Personal details
- Born: 20 October 1862 Gawler, South Australia, Australia
- Died: 12 August 1943 (aged 80) Glendalough, Western Australia, Australia

William Beattie Gordon (20 October 1862 – 12 August 1943) was an Australian politician who was a member of the Legislative Assembly of Western Australia from 1901 to 1911.

== Early life ==
Gordon was born in Gawler, South Australia, to Margaret (née Leonard) and James Gordon. His parents were originally from Renfrewshire, Scotland, and his father was a Free Church of Scotland minister. Initially working as a clerk for the Bank of Adelaide, Gordon later spent a period living in the south-east of the colony, working as a jackaroo and later as a farmer near Bordertown. He moved to Western Australia in 1890, and set up in Perth as a livestock auctioneer and salesman. From 1899 to 1901, Gordon was chairman of the Canning Road Board.

== Politics ==
At the 1901 state election, Gordon was elected to parliament as the member for the newly created seat of South Perth. His seat was abolished at the 1904 election, but he successfully transferred to the seat of Canning, which had been re-created. Gordon was appointed government whip after the election, and served in the position until the 1911 election, when he was defeated in Canning by the Labor Party's Charles Lewis. He made an attempt to re-enter parliament at the 1918 Legislative Council elections, but was defeated by Archibald Sanderson in Metropolitan-Suburban Province.

== Later life ==
After leaving office, Gordon lived in the country, farming first at Namban and later at Gingin. He died in Perth in August 1943, aged 80. Gordon had married Harriet Ann Scott in 1896, with whom he had four sons and two daughters. One of his sons, Jim Gordon, won the Victoria Cross in World War II. Additionally, Gordon's older brother, Sir John Hannah Gordon, was a member of parliament in South Australia.

Parliament of Western Australia
New seat	Member for South Perth; 1901–1904	Abolished
New seat	Member for Canning; 1904–1911	Succeeded by Charles Lewis
