= Arthur Griffith (Australian politician) =

Australian politician

Sir Arthur Griffith

12th President of the Western Australian Legislative Council
- In office May 1974 – May 1977
- Preceded by: Leslie Diver
- Succeeded by: Clive Edward Griffiths

Member of the Western Australian Legislative Council for North Metropolitan Province
- In office 22 May 1965 – 21 May 1977
- Preceded by: Division created
- Succeeded by: Bob Pike

Member of the Western Australian Legislative Council for Suburban Province
- In office 20 June 1953 – 21 May 1965
- Preceded by: James Dimmitt
- Succeeded by: Division abolished

Member of the Western Australian Legislative Assembly for Canning
- In office 25 March 1950 – 14 February 1953
- Preceded by: George Yates
- Succeeded by: Colin Jamieson

Personal details
- Born: 22 April 1913 Geraldton, Western Australia, Australia
- Died: 17 November 1982 (aged 69) Shenton Park, Western Australia
- Party: Liberal Party
- Spouse: Gweneth Macaulay
- Profession: Political organiser and secretary

Sir Arthur Frederick Griffith (22 April 1913 – 17 November 1982) was an Australian politician, and a member of the Western Australian Legislative Assembly from 1950 until 1953 representing the seat of Canning, and a member of the Western Australian Legislative Council representing the Suburban and North Metropolitan provinces from 1953 until 1977. He served as President of the Legislative Council from May 1974 until May 1977.

== Biography ==
Griffith was born in Geraldton, Western Australia, to George Griffith, a life insurance inspector, and Flora (née McDonald). He was educated at South Perth Primary School and at Perth Boys School. He left in 1928 at the age of 15 to take up a job in insurance, and in 1933, he became a law clerk.

On 24 June 1940, he enlisted in the Royal Australian Air Force for service in World War II. On 13 July 1940 at St Albans Church in Highgate, he married Gweneth Evans, with whom he later had one daughter. In 1941, he was commissioned from the ranks, and served in the Northern Territory as a Flying Officer for four weeks in late 1944. He was discharged on 5 November 1945.

Upon his return to civilian life, he became a political organiser for the newly formed Liberal Party, and at the 1950 state election, he won the seat of Canning in the Legislative Assembly. However, at the following election in February 1953, he lost it to Labor's Colin Jamieson. At a by-election four months later, he won one of the two Suburban Province seats in the Legislative Council, and served as a party whip and a member of the Library Committee, before becoming deputy chairman of committees in 1956. From 16 June 1958, he was the Coalition's most senior member in the Council.

Upon the election of the Brand-Watts government at the 1959 election, he became Minister for Mines and Housing in the new government. Upon Arthur Watts's retirement as Deputy Premier and Attorney-General on 1 February 1962, the Coalition had no lawyers amongst its ranks, so the Attorney-General role lapsed and Griffith became Minister for Justice, relying on his clerical training. He continued in these roles as well as Leader of the Government in the Legislative Council until the Government's defeat at the 1971 election.

In 1974, with 21 years' service to that chamber, he became the Father of the Legislative Council, and was elected President, a role he held for the next three years until his retirement from politics.

After his retirement, he served as a member of the Zoological Gardens Board from 1977 until 1982. He died on 17 November 1982 at Sir Charles Gairdner Hospital and was cremated at Karrakatta Cemetery.

Political offices
Preceded by N/A	Leader of the Opposition in the Legislative Council; 1958-1959	Succeeded by N/A
Preceded by Harry Strickland	Leader of the Government in the Legislative Council; 1959–1971	Succeeded by William Willesee
Preceded by Arthur Moir	Minister for Mines; 1959–1971	Succeeded by Donald May
Preceded by Herb Graham	Minister for Housing; 1959–1965	Succeeded by Des O'Neil
Parliament of Western Australia
Western Australian Legislative Assembly
Preceded by George Yates	Member for Canning; 1950–1953	Succeeded by Colin Jamieson
Western Australian Legislative Council
Preceded by James Dimmitt	Member for Suburban Province; 1953–1965	Division abolished
New division	Member for North Metropolitan Province; 1965–1977	Succeeded by Bob Pike
Preceded by Leslie Diver	President of the Western Australian Legislative Council; 1974–1977	Succeeded by Clive Griffiths
