= Ron Kitney =

Australian politician

Member of the Legislative Assembly of Western Australia
- In office 23 March 1968 – 20 February 1971
- Preceded by: John Hearman
- Succeeded by: David Reid
- Constituency: Blackwood

Personal details
- Born: 14 July 1918 Donnybrook, Western Australia, Australia
- Died: 29 March 2011 (aged 92) Wilson, Western Australia, Australia
- Party: Country

Ronald Wilfred Kitney (14 July 1918 – 29 March 2011) was an Australian farmer and politician who was a Country Party member of the Legislative Assembly of Western Australia from 1968 to 1971, representing the seat of Blackwood.

Kitney was born in Donnybrook, Western Australia, to Clara (née Nicholls) and Frank Sidney Kitney. He left school at the age of 14 to work on his family's orchard in Beelerup. In 1942, Kitney enlisted in the Australian Imperial Force. He served with the 35th and 42nd Battalions in the South-West Pacific, reaching the rank of lieutenant by the war's end. He returned to his orchard after the war, and became prominent in fruit-growing circles. Kitney entered parliament at the 1968 state election, unexpectedly defeating the sitting Liberal member in Blackwood, John Hearman, who was also the sitting Speaker of the Legislative Assembly. However, he remained in parliament for only a single term before retiring. The year after leaving parliament, Kitney moved to Lesmurdie, on the outskirts of Perth. He worked as a fruit inspector with the Department of Agriculture for a period, and with his wife also ran a garden centre in Kalamunda. Kitney died in March 2011, aged 92.

Parliament of Western Australia
Preceded by John Hearman	Member for Blackwood; 1968–1971	Succeeded by David Reid
