= Electoral district of South Perth =

State electoral district of Perth, Western Australia

South Perth Western Australia—Legislative Assembly
- Interactive map of electoral district boundaries from the 2025 state election
- State: Western Australia
- Dates current: 1901–1904; 1950–present
- MP: Geoff Baker
- Party: Labor
- Namesake: South Perth
- Electors: 30,403 (2025)
- Area: 19 km^{2} (7.3 sq mi)
- Demographic: Metropolitan
- Coordinates: 32.00°S 115.87°E
Electorates around South Perth:
| Perth | Perth | Victoria Park |
| Nedlands | South Perth | Victoria Park |
| Bateman | Riverton | Victoria Park |

South Perth is an electoral district of the Legislative Assembly in Western Australia. The district is located in the suburbs immediately south of the Perth central business district.

Although occasionally held by an independent, South Perth has typically been a safe Liberal seat. It had never been won by the Labor Party until Geoff Baker won it for the party at the 2021 election.

== Geography ==
South Perth is made up of affluent waterside areas in Perth's inner south. The district is bounded to the north by the Swan River and to the west and south by the Canning River. A series of roads separates the electorate from neighbouring eastern districts. The seat includes the suburbs of Como, Karawara, Manning, Salter Point, Waterford, as well as parts of the suburbs of Kensington and South Perth.

== History ==
South Perth was first created for the 1901 state election, largely replacing the abolished seat of Canning, and won by William Gordon. However, Canning was re-created for the 1904 election and South Perth abolished, with Gordon transferring to Canning.

South Perth was eventually revived for the 1950 state election and has existed continuously as an electorate since then. In 1950, it was won by Liberal candidate George Yates, previously the member for Canning. He was succeeded after one term by Bill Grayden, initially as an independent but soon after as a Liberal. Grayden had previously been the state member for Middle Swan and the federal member for Swan. Grayden was the member for South Perth for 37 years, finally retiring in 1993.

The seat's next MP was Phillip Pendal, first elected as a Liberal but twice re-elected as an independent. Upon Pendal's retirement at the 2005 state election, the seat returned to the Liberal fold when current member John McGrath was elected as its representative. McGrath held the seat until his own retirement at the 2021 election and was succeeded by Geoff Baker. Baker's win was historic as he became the first Labor candidate to win the seat.

== Members for South Perth ==
South Perth (1901–1904)
| Member | Party | Term |
|---|---|---|
| William Gordon | Ministerial | 1901–1904 |
South Perth (1950–present)
| Member | Party | Term |
| George Yates | Liberal Country League | 1950–1956 |
| Bill Grayden | Independent Liberal | 1956–1959 |
| Bill Grayden | Liberal Country League | 1959–1968 |
| Bill Grayden | Liberal | 1968–1993 |
| Phillip Pendal | Liberal | 1993–1995 |
| Phillip Pendal | Independent | 1995–2005 |
| John McGrath | Liberal | 2005–2021 |
| Geoff Baker | Labor | 2021–present |

== Election results ==
2025 Western Australian state election: South Perth
| Party | Candidate | Votes | % | ±% |
|---|---|---|---|---|
| Liberal | Bronwyn Waugh | 10,467 | 40.4 | +4.9 |
| Labor | Geoff Baker | 9,497 | 36.6 | −13.3 |
| Greens | Carl Evers | 3,517 | 13.6 | +3.1 |
| National | Jeremy Miles | 1,236 | 4.8 | +4.8 |
| Independent | Andrew Quin | 643 | 2.5 | +2.5 |
| Christians | Rachel Yuan Zhuang | 574 | 2.2 | +2.2 |
| Total formal votes | | 25,934 | 96.9 | −0.1 |
| Informal votes | | 834 | 3.1 | +0.1 |
| Turnout | | 26,768 | 88.0 | +2.3 |
Two-party-preferred result
| Labor | Geoff Baker | 13,375 | 51.6 | −8.5 |
| Liberal | Bronwyn Waugh | 12,551 | 48.4 | +8.5 |
| Labor hold | | Swing | −8.5 | |
