= Don May (politician) =

Australian politician from Western Australia (1924–2001)

The Honourable Don May

Member of the Legislative Assembly of Western Australia
- In office 31 March 1962 – 20 February 1965
- Preceded by: Des O'Neil
- Succeeded by: Ross Elliott
- Constituency: Canning
- In office 23 March 1968 – 19 February 1977
- Preceded by: None (new creation)
- Succeeded by: Tony Williams
- Constituency: Clontarf

Personal details
- Born: 15 February 1924 Collie, Western Australia, Australia
- Died: 23 September 2001 (aged 77) Perth, Western Australia, Australia
- Party: Labor

Donald George May (15 February 1924 – 23 September 2001) was an Australian politician who was a Labor Party member of the Legislative Assembly of Western Australia from 1962 to 1965 and again from 1968 to 1977. He was a minister in the government of John Tonkin.

== Early life ==
May was born in Collie, Western Australia, to Elizabeth Lyall (née Wilson) and Henry Thomas May. His mother was the daughter of Arthur Wilson, a long-serving Labor MP, and his father was the Labor member for Collie-Preston from 1947 to 1968. May was sent to school in Perth, attending Perth Boys' School and Perth Technical College. He worked as a coal miner and a railway clerk after leaving school, and in 1943 enlisted in the Australian Army, serving in the Pacific as a private with the 2/2nd Commando Squadron. Upon his return to Australia he secured work as a public relations officer with Western Australian Government Railways.

== Politics ==
A member of the Labor Party since 1941, May stood for parliament at the 1962 state election, winning the seat of Canning by a narrow margin. He and his father consequently became the first father–son pair to sit together in the Legislative Assembly. At the 1965 election, the result in Canning was reversed, with May narrowly being defeated by sports journalist Ross Elliott, the Liberal Party candidate. He returned to parliament at the 1968 election as the member for the new seat of Clontarf, located in Perth's southern suburbs.

May increased his majority at the 1971 election and was appointed Minister for Mines and Minister for the North-West in the new Labor government led by John Tonkin. In a reshuffle only a few months after his initial appointment, he lost the North-West portfolio to Herb Graham, but was instead created Minister for Electricity. In July 1972, he also replaced Arthur Bickerton as Minister for Fuel. The Tonkin government was defeated at the 1974 election, but May remained a member of the Tonkin shadow cabinet, and later the shadow cabinet of Colin Jamieson, who replaced Tonkin as leader in 1976. He left parliament at the 1977 election, and worked for a period as chief industrial personnel officer of CBH Group, a grain growers' cooperative. May died in September 2001, aged 77. He married twice, having three children by his first wife.

== See also ==
- Tonkin Ministry (Western Australia)
- Tonkin Shadow Ministry

Parliament of Western Australia
Preceded by Des O'Neil	Member for Canning; 1962–1965	Succeeded by Ross Elliott
New creation	Member for Clontarf; 1968–1977	Succeeded by Tony Williams
Political offices
Preceded by Arthur Griffith	Minister for Mines; 1971–1974	Succeeded by Andrew Mensaros
Preceded by Charles Court	Minister for the North-West; 1971	Succeeded by Herb Graham
Preceded by Crawford Nalder	Minister for Electricity; 1971–1974	Succeeded by Andrew Mensaros
Preceded by Arthur Bickerton	Minister for Fuel; 1972–1974	Succeeded by Andrew Mensaros
