= Electoral district of Clontarf =

Former electoral district in Perth, Western Australia

Clontarf Western Australia—Legislative Assembly
- State: Western Australia
- Dates current: 1968–1989

Clontarf was an electoral district of the Legislative Assembly in the Australian state of Western Australia from 1968 to 1989. It was located in the southern suburbs of Perth on the Canning River, including such suburbs as Wilson, Bentley, Karawara, Rossmoyne and Shelley. It was a marginal seat but with progressive redistributions lost Labor-voting areas to Victoria Park, Canning and Welshpool, and became substantially safer for the Liberal Party.

== Members for Clontarf ==
Member	Party	Term
Donald May	Labor	1968–1977
Tony Williams	Liberal	1977–1989
