= Electoral district of Canning =

Former state electoral district of Western Australia

Canning Western Australia—Legislative Assembly
- State: Western Australia
- Dates current: 1897–1901; 1904–1989
- Namesake: Canning River
- Demographic: South-East Metropolitan

The electoral district of Canning was an electorate in the state of Western Australia. The electorate, which was named for the Canning River which ran through it, was first contested at the 1897 election, but was abolished prior to the 1901 election, with most of its territory transferred to the new seat of South Perth. However, for the 1904 election, South Perth was abolished and Canning re-created. Canning was abolished for a second time in the 1988 redistribution.

Canning covered much of Perth's inner southern region, being reduced progressively as suburban areas such as Applecross, South Perth, Victoria Park and Belmont developed and became populous enough to require their own electorates. By the time of its dissolution it corresponded approximately with the present-day Kenwick district and had become a safe Labor Party seat.

== Geography ==
Canning initially covered all the land south of the Swan River between North Lake Road, Alfred Cove and Epsom Avenue, Redcliffe, extending south and southeast to what are now South Street, Roe Highway and Brook Road. Most of this area was rural at the time, and at the 1897 election contained only 321 enrolled voters, but from the 1920s onwards and especially after World War II, suburban development along with electoral reform resulted in areas meeting the threshold to require an elected member. In the 1929 redistribution, Victoria Park was established and areas northeast of Orrong Road were moved into Middle Swan. Other areas were split in subsequent redistributions:

- 1948: South Perth and Melville
- 1955: Beeloo
- 1966: Clontarf
- 1976: Murdoch

In its final incarnation, from 1983 until 1989, Canning included the suburbs of Beckenham, Ferndale, Kenwick, Langford, Lynwood, Thornlie and Wattle Grove, and parts of Cannington and East Cannington.

== Members for Canning ==
Canning (1897–1901)
Member	Party	Term
Frank Wilson	Oppositionist	1897–1901
Canning (1904–1989)
William Gordon	Ministerial	1904–1911
Charles Lewis	Labor	1911–1914
Robert Robinson	Liberal	1914–1917
Robert Robinson	Nationalist	1917–1921
Alec Clydesdale	Labor	1921–1930
Herbert Wells	Nationalist	1930–1933
Charles Cross	Labor	1933–1947
George Yates	Liberal	1947–1949
George Yates	LCL	1949–1950
Arthur Griffith	LCL	1950–1953
Colin Jamieson	Labor	1953–1956
William Gaffy	Labor	1956–1959
Des O'Neil	LCL	1959–1962
Don May	Labor	1962–1965
Ross Elliott	LCL	1965–1968
Tom Bateman	Labor	1968–1986
Judyth Watson	Labor	1986–1989
