= Electoral district of Blackwood =

Former electoral district in Western Australia

Blackwood Western Australia—Legislative Assembly
- State: Western Australia
- Dates current: 1950–1974
- Namesake: Blackwood River

Blackwood was an electoral district of the Legislative Assembly in the Australian state of Western Australia from 1950 to 1974.

The district was located in the south-west of the state and first contested at the 1950 state election. The seat was abolished ahead of the 1974 state election.

== Members for Blackwood ==
Member	Party	Term
John Hearman	Liberal Country League	1950–1968
Ron Kitney	Country	1968–1971
David Reid	Country	1971–1972
Sandy Lewis	Liberal	1972–1974
