= 1968 Western Australian state election =

- 23 March 1968

All 51 seats in the Western Australian Legislative Assembly and 15 (of the 30) seats to the Western Australian Legislative Council 26 Assembly seats were needed for a majority
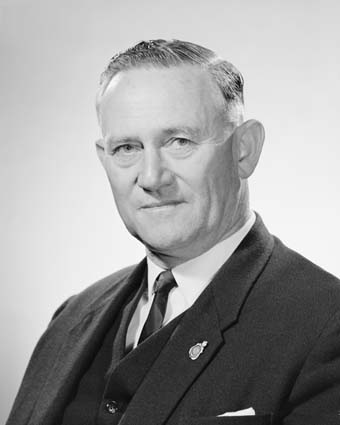

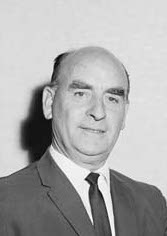
	First party	Second party
Leader	David Brand	John Tonkin
Party	Liberal/Country coalition	Labor
Leader since	1 March 1957	1 January 1967
Leader's seat	Greenough	Melville
Last election	29 seats	21 seats
Seats won	28 seats	23 seats
Seat change	▼1	▲2
Percentage	49.25%	45.35%
Swing	▼4.16	▲2.71
Premier before election
David Brand
Liberal/Country coalition
Elected Premier
David Brand
Liberal/Country coalition

Elections were held in the state of Western Australia on 23 March 1968 to elect all 51 members to the Legislative Assembly and 15 members to the 30-seat Legislative Council. The Liberal-Country coalition government, led by Premier Sir David Brand, won a record fourth term in office against the Labor Party, led by Opposition Leader John Tonkin.

== Results ==
=== Legislative Assembly ===
Western Australian state election, 23 March 1968 Legislative Assembly << 1965–1971 >>
Enrolled voters	359,790^{[1]}				
Votes cast	331,325		Turnout	92.09%	–0.24%
Informal votes	10,255		Informal	3.10%	–0.01%
Summary of votes by party
Party	Primary votes	%	Swing	Seats	Change
Labor	145,605	45.35%	+2.71%	23	+ 2
Liberal and Country	141,271	44.00%	–4.54%	19	– 2
Country	16,879	5.25%	+0.38%	9	+ 1
Democratic Labor	10,456	3.26%	+2.32%	0	± 0
Democratic	2,216	0.69%	+0.69%	0	± 0
Communist	1,694	0.53%	+0.44%	0	± 0
Independent	2,949	0.92%	–1.98%	0	± 0
Total	321,070			51	

^{1} 449,122 electors were enrolled to vote at the election, but 9 seats were uncontested—three Australian Labor Party seats, three Country seats, and three Democratic Labor Party seats.

=== Legislative Council ===
Western Australian state election, 23 March 1968 Legislative Council
Enrolled voters	208,417^{[1]}				
Votes cast	192,342		Turnout	92.29%	+0.15%
Informal votes	8,631		Informal	4.49%	+0.22%
Summary of votes by party
Party	Primary votes	%	Swing	Seats	Change
Labor	85,674	46.64%		6	10
Liberal and Country	67,977	37.00%		4	12
Country	21,228	11.56%		5	8
Democratic Labor	4,502	2.45%		0	0
Independent	4,330	2.36%		0	0
Total	183,711			15	30

^{1} 449,122 electors were enrolled to vote at the election, but 9 seats (60% of the total) were uncontested—three Liberal seats representing 99,137 enrolled voters, three Country seats representing 53,847 enrolled voters, and three Labor seats representing 86,198 enrolled voters.

== Post-election pendulum ==
LCL/Country seats (28)
Marginal
Subiaco	Hugh Guthrie	LCL	0.4%
Kimberley	Alan Ridge	LCL	2.2%
Moore	Edgar Lewis	CP	2.3% v IND
Mirrabooka	Doug Cash	LCL	2.8%
Merredin-Yilgarn	Jack Stewart	LCL	2.9%
Murray	Ewart Runciman	LCL	3.8%
Blackwood	Ron Kitney	CP	4.6% v LCL
Toodyay	James Craig	CP	4.7%
Bunbury	Maurice Williams	LCL	5.7%
Fairly safe
Roe	Bill Young	CP	9.7% v LCL
Safe
Cottesloe	Ross Hutchinson	LCL	10.0%
Mount Lawley	Ray O'Connor	LCL	10.0%
Floreat	Andrew Mensaros	LCL	14.6%
Dale	Cyril Rushton	LCL	15.4%
Darling Range	Ken Dunn	LCL	16.2%
Nedlands	Charles Court	LCL	26.6%
South Perth	Bill Grayden	LCL	28.6% v DLP
East Melville	Des O'Neil	LCL	30.3% v COM
Avon	Harry Gayfer	CP	unopp.
Greenough	David Brand	LCL	unopp.
Katanning	Crawford Nalder	CP	unopp.
Mount Marshall	Ray McPharlin	CP	unopp.
Murchison-Eyre	Richard Burt	LCL	unopp.
Narrogin	William Manning	CP	unopp.
Stirling	Clayton Mitchell	CP	unopp.
Vasse	Stewart Bovell	LCL	unopp.
Wellington	Iven Manning	LCL	unopp.
Wembley	Guy Henn	LCL	unopp.

Labor seats (23)
Marginal
Canning	Tom Bateman	ALP	0.5%
Clontarf	Donald May	ALP	2.2%
Maylands	John Harman	ALP	3.0%
Northam	Ken McIver	ALP	3.6%
Mount Hawthorn	Ron Bertram	ALP	4.2%
Karrinyup	Stan Lapham	ALP	4.3%
Albany	Jack Hall	ALP	5.4%
Fairly safe
Geraldton	Bill Sewell	ALP	6.2%
Perth	Terry Burke	ALP	6.2%
Collie	Tom Jones	ALP	6.6%
Warren	David Evans	ALP	8.8%
Safe
Ascot	Merv Toms	ALP	13.2%
Balcatta	Herb Graham	ALP	13.4%
Gascoyne	Daniel Norton	ALP	14.1%
Belmont	Colin Jamieson	ALP	14.5%
Melville	John Tonkin	ALP	17.5%
Cockburn	Don Taylor	ALP	18.6%
Swan	Bill Haigh	ALP	21.0%
Fremantle	Harry Fletcher	ALP	23.5% v DLP
Boulder-Dundas	Arthur Moir	ALP	unopp.
Kalgoorlie	Tom Evans	ALP	unopp.
Pilbara	Arthur Bickerton	ALP	unopp.
Victoria Park	Ron Davies	ALP	unopp.

== See also ==
- Members of the Western Australian Legislative Assembly, 1965–1968
- Members of the Western Australian Legislative Assembly, 1968–1971
- Candidates of the 1968 Western Australian state election
