= Tom Bateman (politician) =

Australian politician

Thomas Henry Bateman
- Born: 6 December 1922; Fremantle, Western Australia
- Died: 27 September 2003 (aged 80)
- Occupation: Politician
- Spouse: Jean Middleton

Thomas Henry Bateman (6 December 1922 – 27 September 2003) was the Labor Party member for the Electoral district of Canning in the Western Australian Legislative Assembly from 1968 to 1986.

He was born in Fremantle, Western Australia to George Arthur Robert Bateman (farmer) and Ellen Jane Back, and grew up in Toodyay.

Bateman married Jean Middleton on 3 July 1948 at the Methodist church in Donnybrook; they had four children.

He died on 27 September 2003, and was buried at Fremantle Cemetery.

The Tom Bateman Wetlands in the City of Gosnells are named after him. They play an important role in maintaining the health of the Canning River.
