= Results of the 1962 Western Australian state election (Legislative Assembly) =

Election results

Western Australian state election, 31 March 1962 Legislative Assembly << 1959–1965 >>
Enrolled voters	319,594^{[1]}				
Votes cast	297,520		Turnout	93.09%	+1.05%
Informal votes	5,324		Informal	1.79%	–0.79%
Summary of votes by party
Party	Primary votes	%	Swing	Seats	Change
Labor	129,757	44.41%	–0.51%	24	+ 1
Liberal and Country	120,267	41.16%	+3.68%	18	+ 1
Country	17,339	5.93%	–0.61%	8	± 0
Democratic Labor	6,601	2.26%	–2.86%	0	± 0
Ind. Lib.	4,556	1.56%	–2.26%	0	– 2
Communist	1,201	0.41%	–0.43%	0	± 0
Independent	12,475	4.27%	+2.99%	0	± 0
Total	292,196			50	

This is a list of electoral district results of the 1962 Western Australian election.

== Results by electoral district ==
=== Albany ===
1962 Western Australian state election: Albany
Party	Candidate	Votes	%	±%
Labor	Jack Hall	3,765	64.3	
Liberal and Country	John Hutchinson	2,095	35.7	
Total formal votes		5,860	99.2	
Informal votes		49	0.8	
Turnout		5,909	95.1	
Labor hold		Swing		

=== Avon ===
1962 Western Australian state election: Avon
Party	Candidate	Votes	%	±%
Liberal and Country	Arthur Kelly	1,724	37.4	
Country	Harry Gayfer	1,655	36.0	
Country	Leonard Doncon	1,224	26.6	
Total formal votes		4,603	98.6	
Informal votes		67	1.4	
Turnout		4,670	95.8	
Two-candidate-preferred result
Country	Harry Gayfer	2,633	57.2	
Liberal and Country	Arthur Kelly	1,970	42.8	
Country gain from Liberal and Country		Swing		

=== Balcatta ===
1962 Western Australian state election: Balcatta
Party	Candidate	Votes	%	±%
Labor	Herb Graham	5,371	54.9	
Liberal and Country	Rodney Treadgold	3,683	37.6	
Democratic Labor	Adrian Briffa	7,38	7.5	
Total formal votes		9,792	98.3	
Informal votes		167	1.7	
Turnout		9,959	95.9	
Two-party-preferred result
Labor	Herb Graham		56.0	
Liberal and Country	Rodney Treadgold		44.0	
Labor hold		Swing		

- Two party preferred vote was estimated.

=== Bayswater ===
1962 Western Australian state election: Bayswater
Party	Candidate	Votes	%	±%
Labor	Merv Toms	unopposed		
Labor hold		Swing		

=== Beeloo ===
1962 Western Australian state election: Beeloo
Party	Candidate	Votes	%	±%
Labor	Colin Jamieson	5,942	58.6	
Liberal and Country	William How	3,436	33.9	
Democratic Labor	Philip De Lacey	758	7.5	
Total formal votes		10,136	98.0	
Informal votes		202	2.0	
Turnout		10,338	93.7	
Two-party-preferred result
Labor	Colin Jamieson		59.7	
Liberal and Country	William How		40.3	
Labor hold		Swing		

- Two party preferred vote was estimated.

=== Belmont ===
1962 Western Australian state election: Belmont
Party	Candidate	Votes	%	±%
Labor	James Hegney	5,143	53.6	
Independent	Hudson Hudson-Taylor	2,051	21.4	
Independent Labor	Patrick Faulkner	1,198	12.5	
Democratic Labor	Stanley Meredith	841	8.8	
Independent Labor	Michael Coffey	360	3.8	
Total formal votes		9,593	96.3	
Informal votes		372	3.7	
Turnout		9,965	95.1	
Labor hold		Swing		

- Preferences were not distributed.

=== Blackwood ===
1962 Western Australian state election: Blackwood
Party	Candidate	Votes	%	±%
Liberal and Country	John Hearman	3,549	74.1	
Independent	Henry Rudd	1,242	25.9	
Total formal votes		4,791	98.7	
Informal votes		65	1.3	
Turnout		4,856	94.1	
Liberal and Country hold		Swing		

=== Boulder-Eyre ===
1962 Western Australian state election: Boulder-Eyre
Party	Candidate	Votes	%	±%
Labor	Arthur Moir	3,170	62.1	
Liberal and Country	Philip Charsley	1,161	22.7	
Independent	Orlando Stuart	389	7.6	
Country	William Kirwan	385	7.5	
Total formal votes		5,105	98.4	
Informal votes		81	1.6	
Turnout		5,186	92.0	
Two-party-preferred result
Labor	Arthur Moir		66.7	
Liberal and Country	Philip Charsley		33.3	
Labor hold		Swing		

- Two party preferred vote is estimated.

=== Bunbury ===
1962 Western Australian state election: Bunbury
Party	Candidate	Votes	%	±%
Liberal and Country	George Roberts	2,936	53.7	
Labor	Charles Webber	2,535	46.3	
Total formal votes		5,471	99.5	
Informal votes		25	0.5	
Turnout		5,496	94.1	
Liberal and Country hold		Swing		

=== Canning ===
1962 Western Australian state election: Canning
Party	Candidate	Votes	%	±%
Labor	Donald May	4,206	47.4	
Liberal and Country	Raymond Richardson	3,472	39.1	
Country	Arthur Mills	1,193	13.5	
Total formal votes		8,871	98.4	
Informal votes		146	1.6	
Turnout		9,017	94.4	
Two-party-preferred result
Labor	Donald May	4,527	51.0	
Liberal and Country	Raymond Richardson	4,344	49.0	
Labor gain from Liberal and Country		Swing		

=== Claremont ===
1962 Western Australian state election: Claremont
Party	Candidate	Votes	%	±%
Liberal and Country	Harold Crommelin	6,243	68.2	
Independent Liberal	John Smith	2,908	31.8	
Total formal votes		9,151	97.6	
Informal votes		229	2.4	
Turnout		9,380	91.2	
Liberal and Country hold		Swing		

=== Cockburn ===
1962 Western Australian state election: Cockburn
Party	Candidate	Votes	%	±%
Labor	Henry Curran	6,034	65.0	
Liberal and Country	James Burns	2,544	27.4	
Democratic Labor	Maurice Robinson	713	7.7	
Total formal votes		9,291	98.0	
Informal votes		191	2.0	
Turnout		9,482	94.5	
Two-party-preferred result
Labor	Henry Curran		66.1	
Liberal and Country	James Burns		33.9	
Labor hold		Swing		

- Two party preferred vote was estimated.

=== Collie ===
1962 Western Australian state election: Collie
Party	Candidate	Votes	%	±%
Labor	Harry May	2,937	58.9	
Liberal and Country	Edward Cocker	1,352	27.1	
Independent	Norman Coote	698	14.0	
Total formal votes		4,987	99.3	
Informal votes		33	0.7	
Turnout		5,020	94.8	
Two-party-preferred result
Labor	Harry May		65.9	
Liberal and Country	Edward Cocker		34.1	
Labor hold		Swing		

- Two party preferred vote was estimated.

=== Cottesloe ===
1962 Western Australian state election: Cottesloe
Party	Candidate	Votes	%	±%
Liberal and Country	Ross Hutchinson	5,666	56.8	
Labor	David Wright	4,310	43.2	
Total formal votes		9,976	99.0	
Informal votes		96	1.0	
Turnout		10,072	92.4	
Liberal and Country hold		Swing		

=== Dale ===
1962 Western Australian state election: Dale
Party	Candidate	Votes	%	±%
Liberal and Country	Gerald Wild	3,084	58.6	
Labor	Donald Culley	2,181	41.4	
Total formal votes		5,265	98.9	
Informal votes		57	1.1	
Turnout		5,322	93.5	
Liberal and Country hold		Swing		

=== Darling Range ===
1962 Western Australian state election: Darling Range
Party	Candidate	Votes	%	±%
Labor	Jack Metcalfe	1,969	34.3	
Liberal and Country	Ken Dunn	1,890	32.9	
Country	Ray Owen	1,889	32.9	
Total formal votes		5,748	98.2	
Informal votes		108	1.8	
Turnout		5,856	93.4	
Two-party-preferred result
Liberal and Country	Ken Dunn	3,367	58.6	
Labor	Jack Metcalfe	2,381	41.4	
Liberal and Country gain from Country		Swing		

=== East Melville ===
1962 Western Australian state election: East Melville
Party	Candidate	Votes	%	±%
Liberal and Country	Des O'Neil	6,527	63.6	
Labor	Mervyn Jahn	3,739	36.4	
Total formal votes		10,266	99.1	
Informal votes		90	0.9	
Turnout		10,356	94.8	
Liberal and Country hold		Swing		

=== Fremantle ===
1962 Western Australian state election: Fremantle
Party	Candidate	Votes	%	±%
Labor	Harry Fletcher	7,005	67.3	
Liberal and Country	Charles Scampton	3,208	30.8	
Communist	George Kendrick	194	1.9	
Total formal votes		10,407	97.3	
Informal votes		286	2.7	
Turnout		10,693	92.0	
Two-party-preferred result
Labor	Harry Fletcher		69.0	
Liberal and Country	Charles Scampton		31.0	
Labor hold		Swing		

- Two party preferred vote was estimated.

=== Gascoyne ===
1962 Western Australian state election: Gascoyne
Party	Candidate	Votes	%	±%
Labor	Daniel Norton	unopposed		
Labor hold		Swing		

=== Geraldton ===
1962 Western Australian state election: Geraldton
Party	Candidate	Votes	%	±%
Labor	Bill Sewell	2,750	52.4	
Independent	Charles Eadon-Clarke	2,338	44.6	
Independent	John Porteus	158	3.0	
Total formal votes		5,246	99.1	
Informal votes		45	0.9	
Turnout		5,291	93.0	
Two-candidate-preferred result
Labor	Bill Sewell		55.0	
Independent	Charles Eadon-Clarke		45.0	
Labor hold		Swing		

- Two candidate preferred vote was estimated.

=== Greenough ===
1962 Western Australian state election: Greenough
Party	Candidate	Votes	%	±%
Liberal and Country	David Brand	4,188	95.4	
Communist	John Gandini	202	4.6	
Total formal votes		4,390	96.5	
Informal votes		160	3.5	
Turnout		4,550	90.1	
Liberal and Country hold		Swing		

=== Kalgoorlie ===
1962 Western Australian state election: Kalgoorlie
Party	Candidate	Votes	%	±%
Labor	Tom Evans	4,195	76.3	
Liberal and Country	Graham Jonas	1,303	23.7	
Total formal votes		5,498	99.1	
Informal votes		50	0.9	
Turnout		5,548	92.6	
Labor hold		Swing		

=== Karrinyup ===
1962 Western Australian state election: Karrinyup
Party	Candidate	Votes	%	±%
Liberal and Country	Les Nimmo	4,843	46.8	
Labor	Stan Lapham	4,823	46.6	
Democratic Labor	Brian Peachey	685	6.6	
Total formal votes		10,351	99.1	
Informal votes		98	0.9	
Turnout		10,449	95.0	
Two-party-preferred result
Liberal and Country	Les Nimmo	5,437	52.5	
Labor	Stan Lapham	4,914	47.5	
Liberal and Country hold		Swing		

=== Katanning ===
1962 Western Australian state election: Katanning
Party	Candidate	Votes	%	±%
Country	Crawford Nalder	unopposed		
Country hold		Swing		

=== Kimberley ===
1962 Western Australian state election: Kimberley
Party	Candidate	Votes	%	±%
Labor	John Rhatigan	1,098	78.7	
Independent Labor	Lenin McAlear	297	21.3	
Total formal votes		1,395	96.1	
Informal votes		56	3.9	
Turnout		1,451	79.6	
Labor hold		Swing		

=== Maylands ===
1962 Western Australian state election: Maylands
Party	Candidate	Votes	%	±%
Labor	Edward Oldfield	5,109	50.5	
Liberal and Country	John Watts	4,419	43.7	
Democratic Labor	Gerard Lyons	594	5.9	
Total formal votes		10,122	98.5	
Informal votes		150	1.5	
Turnout		10,272	93.6	
Two-party-preferred result
Labor	Edward Oldfield		51.4	
Liberal and Country	John Watts		48.6	
Labor hold		Swing		

=== Melville ===
1962 Western Australian state election: Melville
Party	Candidate	Votes	%	±%
Labor	John Tonkin	6,162	61.3	
Liberal and Country	Eelco Tacoma	3,892	38.7	
Total formal votes		10,054	99.3	
Informal votes		74	0.7	
Turnout		10,128	94.3	
Labor hold		Swing		

=== Merredin-Yilgarn ===
1962 Western Australian state election: Merredin-Yilgarn
Party	Candidate	Votes	%	±%
Labor	Lionel Kelly	2,676	58.1	
Country	Squire Fletcher	1,927	41.9	
Total formal votes		4,603	98.9	
Informal votes		51	1.1	
Turnout		4,654	90.3	
Labor hold		Swing		

=== Moore ===
1962 Western Australian state election: Moore
Party	Candidate	Votes	%	±%
Country	Edgar Lewis	unopposed		
Country hold		Swing		

=== Mount Hawthorn ===
1962 Western Australian state election: Mount Hawthorn
Party	Candidate	Votes	%	±%
Labor	Bill Hegney	5,866	56.2	
Liberal and Country	Hugh O'Doherty	4,571	43.8	
Total formal votes		10,437	98.6	
Informal votes		153	1.4	
Turnout		10,590	93.0	
Labor hold		Swing		

=== Mount Lawley ===
1962 Western Australian state election: Mount Lawley
Party	Candidate	Votes	%	±%
Liberal and Country	Ray O'Connor	5,838	58.4	
Labor	Joe Berinson	4,156	41.6	
Total formal votes		9,994	98.7	
Informal votes		133	1.3	
Turnout		10,127	91.9	
Liberal and Country hold		Swing		

=== Mount Marshall ===
1962 Western Australian state election: Mount Marshall
Party	Candidate	Votes	%	±%
Country	George Cornell	unopposed		
Country hold		Swing		

=== Murchison ===
1962 Western Australian state election: Murchison
Party	Candidate	Votes	%	±%
Liberal and Country	Richard Burt	2,738	55.2	
Labor	William Matthews	1,892	38.2	
Democratic Labor	Kevin Bartle	329	6.6	
Total formal votes		4,959	99.0	
Informal votes		52	1.0	
Turnout		5,011	90.0	
Two-party-preferred result
Liberal and Country	Richard Burt		60.9	
Labor	William Matthews		39.1	
Liberal and Country hold		Swing		

- Two party preferred vote was estimated.

=== Murray ===
1962 Western Australian state election: Murray
Party	Candidate	Votes	%	±%
Liberal and Country	Ross McLarty	3,341	68.7	
Independent	Frederick Crockenberg	1,519	31.3	
Total formal votes		4,860	98.8	
Informal votes		61	1.2	
Turnout		4,921	93.3	
Liberal and Country hold		Swing		

=== Narrogin ===
1962 Western Australian state election: Narrogin
Party	Candidate	Votes	%	±%
Country	William Manning	unopposed		
Country hold		Swing		

=== Nedlands ===
1962 Western Australian state election: Nedlands
Party	Candidate	Votes	%	±%
Liberal and Country	Charles Court	7,165	71.4	
Labor	John Henshaw	2,866	28.6	
Total formal votes		10,031	99.2	
Informal votes		76	0.8	
Turnout		10,107	90.3	
Liberal and Country hold		Swing		

=== Northam ===
1962 Western Australian state election: Northam
Party	Candidate	Votes	%	±%
Labor	Albert Hawke	unopposed		
Labor hold		Swing		

=== Perth ===
1962 Western Australian state election: Perth
Party	Candidate	Votes	%	±%
Labor	Stanley Heal	5,485	53.4	
Liberal and Country	Raymond Nowland	4,151	40.4	
Democratic Labor	Terence Merchant	642	6.2	
Total formal votes		10,278	97.5	
Informal votes		260	2.5	
Turnout		10,538	90.0	
Two-party-preferred result
Labor	Stanley Heal		54.3	
Liberal and Country	Raymond Nowland		45.7	
Labor hold		Swing		

- Two party preferred vote was estimated.

=== Pilbara ===
1962 Western Australian state election: Pilbara
Party	Candidate	Votes	%	±%
Labor	Arthur Bickerton	unopposed		
Labor hold		Swing		

=== Roe ===
1962 Western Australian state election: Roe
Party	Candidate	Votes	%	±%
Country	Tom Hart	3,619	69.7	
Liberal and Country	Colin Cameron	1,571	30.3	
Total formal votes		5,190	98.4	
Informal votes		82	1.6	
Turnout		5,272	92.5	
Country hold		Swing		

=== South Perth ===
1962 Western Australian state election: South Perth
Party	Candidate	Votes	%	±%
Liberal and Country	Bill Grayden	5,557	53.8	
Independent	Harry Repacholi	3,117	30.2	
Independent Liberal	George Strickland	1,648	16.0	
Total formal votes		10,322	97.5	
Informal votes		262	2.5	
Turnout		10,584	92.7	
Two-candidate-preferred result
Liberal and Country	Bill Grayden		61.5	
Independent	Harry Repacholi		38.5	
Liberal and Country hold		Swing		

- Two candidate preferred vote was estimated.

=== Stirling ===
1962 Western Australian state election: Stirling
Party	Candidate	Votes	%	±%
Country	Clayton Mitchell	1,651	35.0	
Independent	Robin Faulkner	1,261	26.7	
Liberal and Country	Roy Dix	866	18.4	
Country	John Lyons	752	15.9	
Independent	Malcol Bateman	185	3.9	
Total formal votes		4,715	97.9	
Informal votes		101	2.1	
Turnout		4,816	92.4	
Two-candidate-preferred result
Country	Clayton Mitchell	2,956	62.7	
Independent	Robin Faulkner	1,759	37.3	
Country hold		Swing		

=== Subiaco ===
1962 Western Australian state election: Subiaco
Party	Candidate	Votes	%	±%
Liberal and Country	Hugh Guthrie	4,994	47.6	
Labor	Percival Potter	4,552	43.4	
Democratic Labor	Francis Dwyer	936	7.2	
Total formal votes		8,438	98.1	
Informal votes		165	1.9	
Turnout		8,603	92.5	
Two-party-preferred result
Liberal and Country	Hugh Guthrie	4,442	52.6	
Labor	Percival Potter	3,996	47.4	
Liberal and Country hold		Swing		

=== Swan ===
1962 Western Australian state election: Swan
Party	Candidate	Votes	%	±%
Labor	John Brady	8,962	91.8	
Communist	Gordon Murray	805	8.2	
Total formal votes		9,767	92.5	
Informal votes		795	7.5	
Turnout		10,562	94.1	
Labor hold		Swing		

=== Toodyay ===
1962 Western Australian state election: Toodyay
Party	Candidate	Votes	%	±%
Country	James Craig	3,044	62.0	
Labor	Slavejko Geroff	1,500	30.6	
Democratic Labor	Leo Agnello	365	7.4	
Total formal votes		4,909	98.1	
Informal votes		93	1.9	
Turnout		5,002	91.0	
Two-party-preferred result
Country	James Craig		68.3	
Labor	Slavejko Geroff		31.7	
Country hold		Swing		

- Two party preferred vote was estimated.

=== Vasse ===
1962 Western Australian state election: Vasse
Party	Candidate	Votes	%	±%
Liberal and Country	William Bovell	unopposed		
Liberal and Country hold		Swing		

=== Victoria Park ===
1962 Western Australian state election: Victoria Park
Party	Candidate	Votes	%	±%
Labor	Ron Davies	6,527	63.9	
Liberal and Country	John Stanbridge	3,691	36.1	
Total formal votes		10,218	99.0	
Informal votes		107	1.0	
Turnout		10,325	95.6	
Labor hold		Swing		

=== Warren ===
1962 Western Australian state election: Warren
Party	Candidate	Votes	%	±%
Labor	Joseph Rowberry	2,831	55.9	
Liberal and Country	Walter Muir	2,231	44.1	
Total formal votes		5,062	99.0	
Informal votes		52	1.0	
Turnout		5,114	94.1	
Labor hold		Swing		

=== Wellington ===
1962 Western Australian state election: Wellington
Party	Candidate	Votes	%	±%
Liberal and Country	Iven Manning	unopposed		
Liberal and Country hold		Swing		

=== Wembley ===
1962 Western Australian state election: Wembley
Party	Candidate	Votes	%	±%
Liberal and Country	Guy Henn	unopposed		
Liberal and Country hold		Swing		

== See also ==
- 1962 Western Australian state election
- Candidates of the 1962 Western Australian state election
- Members of the Western Australian Legislative Assembly, 1962–1965
