= Candidates of the 1962 Western Australian state election =

Western Australian state election candidates in 1962

The 1962 Western Australian state election was held on 31 March 1962.

== Retiring Members ==
=== Labor ===
- Emil Nulsen (MLA) (Eyre)

=== LCL ===
- James Mann (MLA) (Avon Valley)

=== Country ===
- Arthur Watts (MLA) (Stirling)

== Legislative Assembly ==
Sitting members are shown in bold text. Successful candidates are highlighted in the relevant colour. Where there is possible confusion, an asterisk (*) is also used.

Electorate	Held by	Labor candidate	LCL candidate	Country candidate	Other candidates
Albany	Labor	**Jack Hall**	John Hutchinson		
Avon	LCL		Arthur Kelly	Harry Gayfer*; Leonard Doncon	
Balcatta	Labor	**Herb Graham**	Rodney Treadgold		Adrian Briffa (DLP)
Bayswater	Labor	**Merv Toms**			
Beeloo	Labor	**Colin Jamieson**	William How		Philip De Lacey (DLP)
Belmont	Labor	**James Hegney**			Hudson Hudson-Taylor (Ind.); Patrick Faulkner (Ind. Lab); Stanley Meredith (DLP); Michael Coffey (Ind. Lab)
Blackwood	LCL		**John Hearman**		Henry Rudd (Ind.)
Boulder-Eyre	Labor	**Arthur Moir**	Philip Charsley	William Kirwan	Orlando Stuart (Ind.)
Bunbury	LCL	Charles Webber	**George Roberts**		
Canning	LCL	Don May	Raymond Richardson	Arthur Mills	
Claremont	LCL		**Harold Crommelin**		John Smith (Ind. Lib)
Cockburn	Labor	**Henry Curran**	James Burns		Maurice Robinson (DLP)
Collie	Labor	**Harry May**	Edward Cocker		Norman Coote (Ind.)
Cottesloe	LCL	David Wright	**Ross Hutchinson**		
Dale	LCL	Donald Culley	**Gerald Wild**		
Darling Range	Country	Jack Metcalfe	Ken Dunn	**Ray Owen**	
East Melville	LCL	Mervyn Jahn	**Des O'Neil**		
Fremantle	Labor	**Harry Fletcher**	Charles Scampton		George Kendrick (Comm.)
Gascoyne	Labor	**Daniel Norton**			
Geraldton	Labor	**Bill Sewell**			Charles Eadon-Clarke (Ind); John Porteus (Ind)
Greenough	LCL		**David Brand**		John Gandini (Comm.)
Kalgoorlie	Labor	**Tom Evans**	Graham Jonas		
Karrinyup	LCL	Stan Lapham	**Les Nimmo**		Brian Peachey (DLP)
Katanning	Country			**Crawford Nalder**	
Kimberley	Labor	**John Rhatigan**			Lenin McAlear (Ind. Lab)
Maylands	Labor	**Edward Oldfield**	John Watts		Gerard Lyons (DLP)
Melville	Labor	**John Tonkin**	Eelco Tacoma		
Merredin-Yilgarn	Labor	**Lionel Kelly**		Squire Fletcher	
Moore	Country			**Edgar Lewis**	
Mount Hawthorn	Labor	**Bill Hegney**	Hugh O'Doherty		
Mount Lawley	LCL	Joe Berinson	**Ray O'Connor**		
Mount Marshall	Country			**George Cornell**	
Murchison	LCL	William Matthews	**Richard Burt**		Kevin Bartle (DLP)
Murray	LCL		**Ross McLarty**		Frederick Crockenberg (Ind)
Narrogin	Country			**William Manning**	
Nedlands	LCL	John Henshaw	**Charles Court**		
Northam	Labor	**Albert Hawke**			
Perth	Labor	**Stanley Heal**	Raymond Nowland		Terence Merchant (DLP)
Pilbara	Labor	**Arthur Bickerton**			
Roe	Country		Colin Cameron	**Tom Hart**	
South Perth	LCL		**Bill Grayden**		Harry Repacholi (Ind); George Strickland (Ind. Lib)
Stirling	Country		Roy Dix	Clayton Mitchell*; John Lyons	Robin Faulkner (Ind); Malcol Bateman (Ind)
Subiaco	LCL	Percival Potter	**Hugh Guthrie**		Francis Dwyer (DLP)
Swan	Labor	**John Brady**			Gordon Murray (Comm)
Toodyay	Country	Slavejko Geroff		**James Craig**	Leo Agnello (DLP)
Vasse	LCL		**William Bovell**		
Victoria Park	Labor	**Ron Davies**	John Stanbridge		
Warren	Labor	**Joseph Rowberry**	Walter Muir		
Wellington	LCL		**William Bovell**		
Wembley	LCL		**Guy Henn**		

== See also ==
- Members of the Western Australian Legislative Assembly, 1959–1962
- Members of the Western Australian Legislative Assembly, 1962–1965
- 1962 Western Australian Legislative Council election
- 1962 Western Australian state election
