= Electoral results for the district of Murchison-Eyre =

Western Australian district election results

This is a list of electoral results for the electoral district of Murchison-Eyre in Western Australian state elections.

== Members for Murchison-Eyre ==
Murchison (1890–1968)
Member	Party	Term
Everard Darlot	Ministerial	1890–1894
E. T. Hooley	Ministerial	1894–1897
Samuel Mitchell	Ministerial	1897–1901
John Nanson	Ministerial	1901–1904
John Holman	Labor	1904–1921
William Marshall	Labor	1921–1952
Everard O'Brien	Labor	1952–1959
Richard Burt	Liberal Country League	1959–1968
Murchison-Eyre (1968–1989)
Member	Party	Term
Richard Burt	Liberal	1968–1971
Peter Coyne	Liberal	1971–1986
Ross Lightfoot	Liberal	1986–1989
Murchison-Eyre (2005–2008)
Member	Party	Term
John Bowler	Labor	2005–2006
John Bowler	Independent	2006–2008

== Election results ==
=== Elections in the 2000s ===
2005 Western Australian state election: Murchison-Eyre
Party	Candidate	Votes	%	±%
Labor	John Bowler	5,186	51.8	+10.1
Liberal	Colin Brand	3,706	37.0	+11.0
Greens	Scott Ludlam	498	5.0	+3.9
One Nation	Derek Major	355	3.5	−12.5
Christian Democrats	Don Byrne	265	2.6	+2.6
Total formal votes		10,010	95.4	−0.4
Informal votes		485	4.6	+0.4
Turnout		10,495	73.1	
Two-party-preferred result
Labor	John Bowler	5,811	58.1	+0.4
Liberal	Colin Brand	4,194	41.9	−0.4
Labor hold		Swing	+0.4	

=== Elections in the 1980s ===
1986 Western Australian state election: Murchison-Eyre
Party	Candidate	Votes	%	±%
Liberal	Ross Lightfoot	1,124	41.2	−8.1
Labor	Christopher Sweeney	956	35.1	−9.3
Independent	Aubrey Lynch	189	6.9	+6.9
Independent	Neil Dimer	158	5.8	+5.8
Independent	Cyril Barnes	153	5.6	+5.6
Independent	John Ford	147	5.4	+5.4
Total formal votes		2,727	94.8	−1.2
Informal votes		150	5.2	+1.2
Turnout		2,877	77.7	+0.9
Two-party-preferred result
Liberal	Ross Lightfoot	1,411	51.7	+0.4
Labor	Christopher Sweeney	1,316	48.3	−0.4
Liberal hold		Swing	+0.4	

1983 Western Australian state election: Murchison-Eyre
Party	Candidate	Votes	%	±%
Liberal	Peter Coyne	1,167	49.3	
Labor	Francis Donovan	1,052	44.4	
Independent	Kevin Seivwright	149	6.3	
Total formal votes		2,368	96.0	
Informal votes		98	4.0	
Turnout		2,466	76.8	
Two-party-preferred result
Liberal	Peter Coyne	1,214	51.3	
Labor	Francis Donovan	1,154	48.7	
Liberal hold		Swing		

1980 Western Australian state election: Murchison-Eyre
Party	Candidate	Votes	%	±%
Liberal	Peter Coyne	746	48.4	−15.4
Labor	Mark Nevill	558	36.2	0.0
National	Kevin Seivwright	237	15.4	+15.4
Total formal votes		1,541	97.7	+0.2
Informal votes		37	2.3	−0.2
Turnout		1,578	78.9	−2.6
Two-party-preferred result
Liberal	Peter Coyne	909	59.0	−4.9
Labor	Mark Nevill	632	41.0	+4.9
Liberal hold		Swing	−4.9	

=== Elections in the 1970s ===
1977 Western Australian state election: Murchison-Eyre
Party	Candidate	Votes	%	±%
Liberal	Peter Coyne	1,069	63.8	
Labor	Patricia Logue	607	36.2	
Total formal votes		1,676	97.5	
Informal votes		43	2.5	
Turnout		1,719	81.5	
Liberal hold		Swing		

1974 Western Australian state election: Murchison-Eyre
Party	Candidate	Votes	%	±%
Liberal	Peter Coyne	1,022	57.0	
Labor	Julian Grill	770	43.0	
Total formal votes		1,792	97.4	
Informal votes		48	2.6	
Turnout		1,840	83.0	
Liberal hold		Swing		

1971 Western Australian state election: Murchison-Eyre
Party	Candidate	Votes	%	±%
Liberal	Peter Coyne	658	46.0	−54.0
Labor	Geoffrey Bailey	600	42.0	+42.0
United Farmers	Bevan Hamersley	109	7.6	+7.6
Democratic Labor	Kevin Sauer	62	4.3	+4.3
Total formal votes		1,429	95.6	
Informal votes		65	4.4	
Turnout		1,494	81.2	
Two-party-preferred result
Liberal	Peter Coyne	747	52.3	−47.7
Labor	Geoffrey Bailey	682	47.7	+47.7
Liberal hold		Swing	N/A	

=== Elections in the 1960s ===
1968 Western Australian state election: Murchison-Eyre
Party	Candidate	Votes	%	±%
Liberal and Country	Richard Burt	unopposed		
Liberal and Country hold		Swing		

1965 Western Australian state election: Murchison
Party	Candidate	Votes	%	±%
Liberal and Country	Richard Burt	2,824	63.5	+8.3
Labor	Tom Hartrey	1,626	36.5	−1.7
Total formal votes		4,450	97.2	−1.8
Informal votes		128	2.8	+1.8
Turnout		4,578	86.7	−3.3
Liberal and Country hold		Swing	+2.9	

1962 Western Australian state election: Murchison
Party	Candidate	Votes	%	±%
Liberal and Country	Richard Burt	2,738	55.2	
Labor	William Matthews	1,892	38.2	
Democratic Labor	Kevin Bartle	329	6.6	
Total formal votes		4,959	99.0	
Informal votes		52	1.0	
Turnout		5,011	90.0	
Two-party-preferred result
Liberal and Country	Richard Burt		60.9	
Labor	William Matthews		39.1	
Liberal and Country hold		Swing		

- Two party preferred vote was estimated.

=== Elections in the 1950s ===
1959 Western Australian state election: Murchison
Party	Candidate	Votes	%	±%
Labor	Everard O'Brien	1,638	47.0	−12.1
Liberal and Country	Richard Burt	1,555	44.6	+3.7
Democratic Labor	George Jensen	295	8.5	+8.5
Total formal votes		3,488	98.7	+1.5
Informal votes		47	1.3	−1.5
Turnout		3,535	87.8	+2.7
Two-party-preferred result
Liberal and Country	Richard Burt	1,778	51.0	+10.1
Labor	Everard O'Brien	1,710	49.0	−10.1
Liberal and Country gain from Labor		Swing	+10.1	

1956 Western Australian state election: Murchison
Party	Candidate	Votes	%	±%
Labor	Everard O'Brien	2,064	59.1	
Liberal and Country	Carlyle Newman	1,430	40.9	
Total formal votes		3,494	97.2	
Informal votes		102	2.8	
Turnout		3,596	85.1	
Labor hold		Swing		

1953 Western Australian state election: Murchison
Party	Candidate	Votes	%	±%
Labor	Everard O'Brien	1,559	59.2	−0.8
Liberal and Country	John Porteus	569	21.6	+21.6
Liberal and Country	John Thompson	505	19.2	−20.8
Total formal votes		2,633	97.2	−1.0
Informal votes		77	2.8	+1.0
Turnout		2,710	89.6	+10.3
Two-party-preferred result
Labor	Everard O'Brien		61.1	+1.1
Liberal and Country	John Porteus		38.9	−1.1
Labor hold		Swing	+1.1	

- Two party preferred vote was estimated.

1952 Murchison state by-election
Party	Candidate	Votes	%	±%
Labor	Everard O'Brien	1,440	60.0	N/A
Liberal and Country	John Thompson	959	40.0	+40.0
Total formal votes		2,399	98.2	
Informal votes		45	1.8	
Turnout		2,444	79.3	
Labor hold		Swing	N/A	

1950 Western Australian state election: Murchison
Party	Candidate	Votes	%	±%
Labor	William Marshall	unopposed		
Labor hold		Swing		

=== Elections in the 1940s ===
1947 Western Australian state election: Murchison
Party	Candidate	Votes	%	±%
Labor	William Marshall	unopposed		
Labor hold		Swing		

1943 Western Australian state election: Murchison
Party	Candidate	Votes	%	±%
Labor	William Marshall	unopposed		
Labor hold		Swing		

=== Elections in the 1930s ===
1939 Western Australian state election: Murchison
Party	Candidate	Votes	%	±%
Labor	William Marshall	2,959	81.9	−18.1
Independent Labor	John Montgomery	655	18.1	+18.1
Total formal votes		3,614	97.3	
Informal votes		99	2.7	
Turnout		3,713	76.8	
Labor hold		Swing	N/A	

1936 Western Australian state election: Murchison
Party	Candidate	Votes	%	±%
Labor	William Marshall	unopposed		
Labor hold		Swing		

1933 Western Australian state election: Murchison
Party	Candidate	Votes	%	±%
Labor	William Marshall	1,483	86.9	−13.1
Independent Labor	Donald Dunjey	224	13.1	+13.1
Total formal votes		1,707	96.1	
Informal votes		69	3.9	
Turnout		1,776	69.6	
Labor hold		Swing		

1930 Western Australian state election: Murchison
Party	Candidate	Votes	%	±%
Labor	William Marshall	unopposed		
Labor hold		Swing		

=== Elections in the 1920s ===
1927 Western Australian state election: Murchison
Party	Candidate	Votes	%	±%
Labor	William Marshall	unopposed		
Labor hold		Swing		

1924 Western Australian state election: Murchison
Party	Candidate	Votes	%	±%
Labor	William Marshall	unopposed		
Labor hold		Swing		

1921 Western Australian state election: Murchison
Party	Candidate	Votes	%	±%
Labor	William Marshall	455	55.2	−8.7
Nationalist	Joseph Bryant	198	24.0	+24.0
Country	James Chesson	171	20.7	+20.7
Total formal votes		824	97.7	−1.6
Informal votes		19	2.3	+1.6
Turnout		843	73.0	+14.7
Labor hold		Swing	N/A	

- Preferences were not distributed.

=== Elections in the 1910s ===
1917 Western Australian state election: Murchison
Party	Candidate	Votes	%	±%
Labor	John Holman	562	63.9	–36.1
National Labor	William Spiers	318	36.1	+36.1
Total formal votes		880	99.3	n/a
Informal votes		6	0.7	n/a
Turnout		886	58.3	n/a
Labor hold		Swing	–36.1	

1914 Western Australian state election: Murchison
Party	Candidate	Votes	%	±%
Labor	John Holman	unopposed		
Labor hold		Swing		

1911 Western Australian state election: Murchison
Party	Candidate	Votes	%	±%
Labor	John Holman	unopposed		
Labor hold		Swing		

=== Elections in the 1900s ===
1908 Western Australian state election: Murchison
Party	Candidate	Votes	%	±%
Labour	John Holman	941	90.6	−9.4
Ministerialist	Samuel Dyke	98	9.4	+9.4
Total formal votes		1,039	98.0	
Informal votes		21	2.0	
Turnout		1,060	50.1	
Labour hold		Swing	N/A	

1905 Western Australian state election: Murchison
Party	Candidate	Votes	%	±%
Labour	John Holman	unopposed		
Labour hold		Swing	N/A	

1904 Western Australian state election: Murchison
Party	Candidate	Votes	%	±%
Labour	John Holman	unopposed		
Labour gain from Ministerialist		Swing	N/A	

1901 Western Australian state election: Murchison
Party	Candidate	Votes	%	±%
Opposition	John Nanson	153	50.2	+50.2
Ministerialist	Samuel Mitchell	152	49.8	–50.2
Total formal votes		305	98.4	n/a
Informal votes		5	1.6	n/a
Turnout		310	68.1	n/a
Opposition gain from Ministerialist		Swing	+50.2	

- Mitchell had held the seat unopposed in 1897.

=== Elections in the 1890s ===
1897 Western Australian colonial election: Murchison
Party	Candidate	Votes	%	±%
Ministerialist	Samuel Mitchell	unopposed		
Ministerialist hold		Swing		

1894 Western Australian colonial election: Murchison
Party	Candidate	Votes	%	±%
None	Everard Darlot	unopposed		

1890 Western Australian colonial election: Murchison
Party	Candidate	Votes	%	±%
None	Everard Darlot	unopposed		
