= Members of the Western Australian Legislative Assembly, 1962–1965 =

This is a list of members of the Western Australian Legislative Assembly from 1962 to 1965:

Name	Party	District	Years in office
Arthur Bickerton	Labor	Pilbara	1958–1974
Stewart Bovell	Liberal	Vasse	1947–1971
John Brady	Labor	Swan	1948–1974
David Brand	Liberal	Greenough	1945–1975
Richard Burt	Liberal	Murchison	1959–1971
George Cornell	Country	Mount Marshall	1947–1967
Charles Court	Liberal	Nedlands	1953–1982
James Craig	Country	Toodyay	1959–1971
Harold Crommelin	Liberal	Claremont	1956–1968
Henry Curran	Labor	Cockburn	1960–1968
Ron Davies	Labor	Victoria Park	1961–1986
Ken Dunn^{[2]}	Liberal	Darling Range	1962–1971
Donald May	Labor	Canning	1962–1965; 1968–1977
Tom Evans	Labor	Kalgoorlie	1956–1980
Harry Fletcher	Labor	Fremantle	1959–1977
Harry Gayfer	Country	Avon	1962–1974
Herb Graham	Labor	Balcatta	1943–1973
Bill Grayden	Liberal	South Perth	1947–1949; 1956–1993
Hugh Guthrie	Liberal	Subiaco	1959–1971
Jack Hall	Labor	Albany	1956–1970
Tom Hart	Country	Roe	1962–1967
Albert Hawke	Labor	Northam	1933–1968
Stanley Heal	Labor	Perth	1953–1965
John Hearman	Liberal	Blackwood	1950–1968
Bill Hegney	Labor	Mount Hawthorn	1939–1968
James Hegney	Labor	Belmont	1930–1947; 1950–1968
Guy Henn	Liberal	Wembley	1959–1971
Ross Hutchinson	Liberal	Cottesloe	1950–1977
Colin Jamieson	Labor	Beeloo	1953–1986
Lionel Kelly	Labor	Merredin-Yilgarn	1941–1968
Edgar Lewis	Country	Moore	1958–1974
Iven Manning	Liberal	Wellington	1950–1974
William Manning	Country	Narrogin	1956–1974
Harry May	Labor	Collie	1947–1968
Sir Ross McLarty^{[1]}	Liberal	Murray	1930–1962
Clayton Mitchell	Country	Stirling	1962–1971
Arthur Moir	Labor	Boulder-Eyre	1951–1971
Crawford Nalder	Country	Katanning	1947–1974
Les Nimmo	Liberal	Karrinyup	1947–1956; 1959–1968
Daniel Norton	Labor	Gascoyne	1953–1974
Ray O'Connor	Liberal	Mount Lawley	1959–1984
Des O'Neil	Liberal	East Melville	1959–1980
Edward Oldfield	Labor	Maylands	1951–1965
John Rhatigan	Labor	Kimberley	1953–1968
George Roberts^{[3]}	Liberal	Bunbury	1955–1962
Joseph Rowberry	Labor	Warren	1958–1968
Ewart Runciman^{[1]}	Liberal	Murray	1962–1974
Bill Sewell	Labor	Geraldton	1950–1974
Merv Toms	Labor	Bayswater	1956–1971
John Tonkin	Labor	Melville	1933–1977
Gerald Wild	Liberal	Dale	1947–1965
Maurice Williams^{[3]}	Liberal	Bunbury	1962–1973

== Notes ==
^{1} On 7 May 1962, the Liberal member for Murray, former premier Sir Ross McLarty, resigned. Liberal candidate Ewart Runciman won the resulting by-election on 23 June 1962.
^{2} At the 1962 state election in Darling Range, Liberal candidate Ken Dunn defeated the sitting Country member Ray Owen. The Labor candidate (Jack Metcalfe) narrowly won the primary vote, whilst Dunn polled one vote ahead of Owen, meaning Owen was eliminated and his votes distributed between Dunn and Metcalfe. A petition was filed and the Court of Disputed Returns ordered a fresh election for 22 July 1962, which widened the gap to 15 votes.
^{3} On 22 July 1962, the Liberal member for Bunbury, George Roberts, died. Liberal candidate Maurice Williams won the resulting by-election on 1 September 1962.

== Sources ==
- "Former Members" (PDF). Parliament of Western Australia. 2011. Archived from the original (PDF) on 7 August 2011.
