= Electoral results for the district of Avon =

Western Australian district election results

This is a list of electoral results for the electoral district of Avon in Western Australian state elections.

== Members for Avon ==
Avon (1911–1950)
| Member | Party | Term |
|---|---|---|
| Thomas Bath | Labor | 1911–1914 |
| Tom Harrison | Country | 1914–1923 |
| Tom Harrison | Country (MCP) | 1923–1924 |
| Harry Griffiths | Country (ECP) | 1924 |
| Harry Griffiths | Country | 1924–1935 |
| Ignatius Boyle | Country | 1935–1943 |
| William Telfer | Labor | 1943–1947 |
| George Cornell | Country | 1947–1950 |
Avon Valley (1950–1962)
| Member | Party | Term |
| James Mann | Liberal Country League | 1950–1962 |
Avon (1962–2008)
| Member | Party | Term |
| Harry Gayfer | Country | 1962–1974 |
| Ken McIver | Labor | 1974–1986 |
| Max Trenorden | National | 1986–2008 |

== Election results ==
=== Elections in the 2000s ===
2005 Western Australian state election: Avon
| Party | Candidate | Votes | % | ±% |
|---|---|---|---|---|
| National | Max Trenorden | 7,469 | 63.8 | +36.9 |
| Labor | Gerry Sturman | 2,650 | 22.6 | +0.8 |
| Greens | Adrian Price | 686 | 5.9 | +1.4 |
| One Nation | Boyd Martin | 470 | 4.0 | −15.1 |
| Christian Democrats | Bob Adair | 278 | 2.4 | +2.4 |
| Citizens Electoral Council | Ron McLean | 149 | 1.3 | +1.3 |
| Total formal votes | | 11,702 | 95.3 | −0.2 |
| Informal votes | | 571 | 4.7 | +0.2 |
| Turnout | | 12,273 | 90.9 | |
Two-party-preferred result
| National | Max Trenorden | 8,429 | 72.1 | +14.2 |
| Labor | Gerry Sturman | 3,266 | 27.9 | −14.2 |
| National hold | | Swing | +14.2 | |

2001 Western Australian state election: Avon
| Party | Candidate | Votes | % | ±% |
|---|---|---|---|---|
| National | Max Trenorden | 2,965 | 24.9 | −36.0 |
| Labor | Phil Shearer | 2,847 | 23.9 | −3.7 |
| One Nation | Ken Collins | 2,202 | 18.5 | +18.5 |
| Liberal | Joanne Burges | 1,905 | 16.0 | +16.0 |
| Independent | Peter Morton | 1,026 | 8.6 | +8.6 |
| Greens | Kate Elsey | 657 | 5.5 | +5.5 |
| Curtin Labor Alliance | Stuart Smith | 288 | 2.4 | +2.4 |
| Total formal votes | | 11,890 | 95.8 | +0.4 |
| Informal votes | | 522 | 4.2 | −0.4 |
| Turnout | | 12,412 | 92.6 | |
Two-party-preferred result
| National | Max Trenorden | 6,395 | 54.8 | −12.0 |
| Labor | Phil Shearer | 5,269 | 45.2 | +12.0 |
| National hold | | Swing | −12.0 | |

=== Elections in the 1990s ===
1996 Western Australian state election: Avon
| Party | Candidate | Votes | % | ±% |
|---|---|---|---|---|
| National | Max Trenorden | 6,795 | 60.9 | +22.9 |
| Labor | Paul Andrews | 3,080 | 27.6 | −2.4 |
| Independent | Stephen Bluck | 1,276 | 11.4 | +11.4 |
| Total formal votes | | 11,151 | 95.4 | −0.9 |
| Informal votes | | 536 | 4.6 | +0.9 |
| Turnout | | 11,687 | 91.0 | |
Two-party-preferred result
| National | Max Trenorden | 7,435 | 66.8 | +1.9 |
| Labor | Paul Andrews | 3,703 | 33.2 | −1.9 |
| National hold | | Swing | +1.9 | |

1993 Western Australian state election: Avon
| Party | Candidate | Votes | % | ±% |
|---|---|---|---|---|
| National | Max Trenorden | 4,555 | 38.8 | −0.7 |
| Labor | Walerjan Sieczka | 3,403 | 29.0 | −2.7 |
| Liberal | Bevan Henderson | 2,751 | 23.4 | −5.4 |
| Independent | Paul Maycock | 1,030 | 8.8 | +8.8 |
| Total formal votes | | 11,739 | 96.4 | +3.3 |
| Informal votes | | 439 | 3.6 | −3.3 |
| Turnout | | 12,178 | 94.2 | +2.5 |
Two-party-preferred result
| National | Max Trenorden | 7,750 | 66.0 | 0.0 |
| Labor | Walerjan Sieczka | 3,989 | 34.0 | 0.0 |
| National hold | | Swing | 0.0 | |

=== Elections in the 1980s ===
1989 Western Australian state election: Avon
| Party | Candidate | Votes | % | ±% |
|---|---|---|---|---|
| National | Max Trenorden | 4,132 | 39.5 | +10.9 |
| Labor | Robert Duncanson | 3,315 | 31.7 | −11.8 |
| Liberal | John Dival | 3,007 | 28.8 | +1.0 |
| Total formal votes | | 10,454 | 93.1 | |
| Informal votes | | 769 | 6.9 | |
| Turnout | | 11,223 | 91.7 | |
Two-party-preferred result
| National | Max Trenorden | 6,900 | 66.0 | +11.4 |
| Labor | Robert Duncanson | 3,554 | 34.0 | −11.4 |
| National hold | | Swing | +11.4 | |

1986 Western Australian state election: Avon
| Party | Candidate | Votes | % | ±% |
|---|---|---|---|---|
| Labor | Ken McIver | 4,186 | 46.5 | −6.1 |
| National | Max Trenorden | 2,575 | 28.6 | +5.3 |
| Liberal | Michael Cahill | 2,250 | 25.0 | +0.9 |
| Total formal votes | | 9,011 | 98.5 | +0.5 |
| Informal votes | | 139 | 1.5 | −0.5 |
| Turnout | | 9,150 | 93.9 | +3.8 |
Two-party-preferred result
| National | Max Trenorden | 4,668 | 51.8 | +51.8 |
| Labor | Ken McIver | 4,343 | 48.2 | −10.2 |
| National gain from Labor | | Swing | N/A | |

1983 Western Australian state election: Avon
| Party | Candidate | Votes | % | ±% |
|---|---|---|---|---|
| Labor | Ken McIver | 4,377 | 52.6 | |
| Liberal | Thomas Richards | 2,004 | 24.1 | |
| National Country | Max Trenorden | 1,938 | 23.3 | |
| Total formal votes | | 8,319 | 98.0 | |
| Informal votes | | 168 | 2.0 | |
| Turnout | | 8,487 | 90.1 | |
Two-party-preferred result
| Labor | Ken McIver | 4,858 | 58.4 | |
| Liberal | Thomas Richards | 3,461 | 41.6 | |
| Labor hold | | Swing | | |

1980 Western Australian state election: Avon
| Party | Candidate | Votes | % | ±% |
|---|---|---|---|---|
| Labor | Ken McIver | 3,913 | 55.4 | +1.6 |
| Liberal | Julian Stanwix | 2,124 | 30.1 | −16.1 |
| National Country | Allan Baxter | 1,021 | 14.5 | +14.5 |
| Total formal votes | | 7,058 | 97.0 | −0.7 |
| Informal votes | | 219 | 3.0 | +0.7 |
| Turnout | | 7,277 | 92.0 | −1.8 |
Two-party-preferred result
| Labor | Ken McIver | 4,005 | 56.7 | +2.9 |
| Liberal | Julian Stanwix | 3,053 | 43.3 | −2.9 |
| Labor hold | | Swing | +2.9 | |

=== Elections in the 1970s ===
1977 Western Australian state election: Avon
| Party | Candidate | Votes | % | ±% |
|---|---|---|---|---|
| Labor | Ken McIver | 3,787 | 53.8 | |
| Liberal | Kelvin Bulloch | 3,257 | 46.2 | |
| Total formal votes | | 7,044 | 97.7 | |
| Informal votes | | 168 | 2.3 | |
| Turnout | | 7,212 | 93.8 | |
| Labor hold | | Swing | −0.9 | |

1974 Western Australian state election: Avon
| Party | Candidate | Votes | % | ±% |
|---|---|---|---|---|
| Labor | Ken McIver | 3,542 | 50.5 | |
| Liberal | Owen Bloomfield | 1,777 | 25.3 | |
| National Alliance | Albert Llewellyn | 1,692 | 24.1 | |
| Total formal votes | | 7,011 | 98.0 | |
| Informal votes | | 140 | 2.0 | |
| Turnout | | 7,151 | 92.2 | |
Two-party-preferred result
| Labor | Ken McIver | 3,796 | 54.1 | |
| Liberal | Owen Bloomfield | 3,215 | 45.9 | |
| Labor hold | | Swing | | |

1971 Western Australian state election: Avon
| Party | Candidate | Votes | % | ±% |
|---|---|---|---|---|
| Country | Harry Gayfer | 4,145 | 75.3 | −24.7 |
| Independent | Tom Ingham | 786 | 14.3 | +14.3 |
| Democratic Labor | Brian Marwick | 576 | 10.5 | +10.5 |
| Total formal votes | | 5,507 | 96.9 | |
| Informal votes | | 173 | 3.1 | |
| Turnout | | 5,680 | 93.0 | |
Two-candidate-preferred result
| Country | Harry Gayfer | 4,433 | 80.5 | −19.5 |
| Independent | Tom Ingham | 1,074 | 19.5 | +19.5 |
| Country hold | | Swing | N/A | |

=== Elections in the 1960s ===
1968 Western Australian state election: Avon
| Party | Candidate | Votes | % | ±% |
|---|---|---|---|---|
| Country | Harry Gayfer | unopposed | | |
| Country hold | | Swing | | |

1965 Western Australian state election: Avon
| Party | Candidate | Votes | % | ±% |
|---|---|---|---|---|
| Country | Harry Gayfer | unopposed | | |
| Country hold | | Swing | | |

1962 Western Australian state election: Avon
| Party | Candidate | Votes | % | ±% |
|---|---|---|---|---|
| Liberal and Country | Arthur Kelly | 1,724 | 37.4 | |
| Country | Harry Gayfer | 1,655 | 36.0 | |
| Country | Leonard Doncon | 1,224 | 26.6 | |
| Total formal votes | | 4,603 | 98.6 | |
| Informal votes | | 67 | 1.4 | |
| Turnout | | 4,670 | 95.8 | |
Two-candidate-preferred result
| Country | Harry Gayfer | 2,633 | 57.2 | |
| Liberal and Country | Arthur Kelly | 1,970 | 42.8 | |
| Country gain from Liberal and Country | | Swing | | |

=== Elections in the 1950s ===
1959 Western Australian state election: Avon Valley
| Party | Candidate | Votes | % | ±% |
|---|---|---|---|---|
| Liberal and Country | James Mann | 2,712 | 60.6 | −1.5 |
| Country | John Stratton | 1,761 | 39.4 | +1.5 |
| Total formal votes | | 4,473 | 97.7 | +1.1 |
| Informal votes | | 106 | 2.3 | −1.1 |
| Turnout | | 4,579 | 93.3 | +1.7 |
| Liberal and Country hold | | Swing | −1.5 | |

1956 Western Australian state election: Avon Valley
| Party | Candidate | Votes | % | ±% |
|---|---|---|---|---|
| Liberal and Country | James Mann | 2,746 | 62.1 | |
| Country | John Stratton | 1,679 | 37.9 | |
| Total formal votes | | 4,425 | 96.6 | |
| Informal votes | | 155 | 3.4 | |
| Turnout | | 4,580 | 91.6 | |
| Liberal and Country hold | | Swing | | |

1953 Western Australian state election: Avon Valley
| Party | Candidate | Votes | % | ±% |
|---|---|---|---|---|
| Liberal and Country | James Mann | unopposed | | |
| Liberal and Country hold | | Swing | | |

1950 Western Australian state election: Avon Valley
| Party | Candidate | Votes | % | ±% |
|---|---|---|---|---|
| Liberal and Country | James Mann | 2,135 | 56.5 | |
| Country | Keith Halbert | 994 | 26.3 | |
| Country | Milford Smith | 648 | 17.2 | |
| Total formal votes | | 3,777 | 97.9 | |
| Informal votes | | 79 | 2.1 | |
| Turnout | | 3,856 | 93.8 | |
| Liberal and Country hold | | Swing | | |

- Preferences were not distributed.

=== Elections in the 1940s ===
1947 Western Australian state election: Avon
| Party | Candidate | Votes | % | ±% |
|---|---|---|---|---|
| Country | George Cornell | 1,529 | 50.7 | +1.0 |
| Labor | William Telfer | 1,487 | 49.3 | −1.0 |
| Total formal votes | | 3,016 | 98.8 | +1.0 |
| Informal votes | | 38 | 1.2 | −1.0 |
| Turnout | | 3,054 | 85.7 | −1.9 |
| Country gain from Labor | | Swing | +1.0 | |

1943 Western Australian state election: Avon
| Party | Candidate | Votes | % | ±% |
|---|---|---|---|---|
| Labor | William Telfer | 1,433 | 50.3 | +8.0 |
| Country | Ignatius Boyle | 1,418 | 49.7 | −8.0 |
| Total formal votes | | 2,851 | 97.8 | +0.3 |
| Informal votes | | 64 | 2.2 | −0.3 |
| Turnout | | 2,915 | 87.6 | −5.9 |
| Labor gain from Country | | Swing | +8.0 | |

=== Elections in the 1930s ===
1939 Western Australian state election: Avon
| Party | Candidate | Votes | % | ±% |
|---|---|---|---|---|
| Country | Ignatius Boyle | 1,972 | 57.7 | +4.8 |
| Independent Country | John Tankard | 1,445 | 42.3 | +42.3 |
| Total formal votes | | 3,417 | 97.5 | −0.5 |
| Informal votes | | 89 | 2.5 | +0.5 |
| Turnout | | 3,506 | 93.5 | +25.9 |
| Country hold | | Swing | N/A | |

1936 Western Australian state election: Avon
| Party | Candidate | Votes | % | ±% |
|---|---|---|---|---|
| Country | Ignatius Boyle | 1,301 | 52.9 | +11.3 |
| Country | Hugh Harling | 1,160 | 47.1 | +47.1 |
| Total formal votes | | 2,461 | 98.0 | +0.3 |
| Informal votes | | 51 | 2.0 | −0.3 |
| Turnout | | 2,512 | 67.6 | −24.2 |
| Country hold | | Swing | N/A | |

1933 Western Australian state election: Avon
| Party | Candidate | Votes | % | ±% |
|---|---|---|---|---|
| Labor | Fred Law | 1,608 | 46.0 | +9.2 |
| Country | Harry Griffiths | 1,453 | 41.6 | −21.6 |
| Country | John Mann | 433 | 12.4 | +12.4 |
| Total formal votes | | 3,494 | 97.7 | −1.5 |
| Informal votes | | 83 | 2.3 | +1.5 |
| Turnout | | 3,577 | 91.8 | +17.3 |
Two-party-preferred result
| Country | Harry Griffiths | 1,781 | 51.0 | −12.2 |
| Labor | Fred Law | 1,713 | 49.0 | +12.2 |
| Country hold | | Swing | −12.2 | |

1930 Western Australian state election: Avon
| Party | Candidate | Votes | % | ±% |
|---|---|---|---|---|
| Country | Harry Griffiths | 1,981 | 63.2 | |
| Labor | James Bermingham | 1,153 | 36.8 | |
| Total formal votes | | 3,134 | 99.2 | |
| Informal votes | | 25 | 0.8 | |
| Turnout | | 3,159 | 74.5 | |
| Country hold | | Swing | | |

=== Elections in the 1920s ===
1927 Western Australian state election: Avon
| Party | Candidate | Votes | % | ±% |
|---|---|---|---|---|
| Country | Harry Griffiths | 2,143 | 59.7 | +35.1 |
| Labor | Patrick Coffey | 1,449 | 40.3 | −4.6 |
| Total formal votes | | 3,565 | 99.2 | +0.9 |
| Informal votes | | 27 | 0.8 | −0.9 |
| Turnout | | 3,619 | 69.1 | +8.1 |
| Country hold | | Swing | +9.2 | |

1924 Western Australian state election: Avon
| Party | Candidate | Votes | % | ±% |
|---|---|---|---|---|
| Labor | Patrick Coffey | 1,199 | 44.9 | −0.6 |
| Executive Country | Harry Griffiths | 657 | 24.6 | +24.6 |
| Country | Tom Harrison | 504 | 18.9 | −30.6 |
| Executive Country | Tom Bolton | 311 | 11.6 | +11.6 |
| Total formal votes | | 2,671 | 98.3 | +0.2 |
| Informal votes | | 46 | 1.7 | −0.2 |
| Turnout | | 2,717 | 61.0 | +4.3 |
Two-party-preferred result
| Executive Country | Harry Griffiths | 1,350 | 50.5 | +50.5 |
| Labor | Patrick Coffey | 1,321 | 49.5 | +2.2 |
| Executive Country gain from Country | | Swing | N/A | |

1921 Western Australian state election: Avon
| Party | Candidate | Votes | % | ±% |
|---|---|---|---|---|
| Country | Tom Harrison | 1,028 | 49.5 | +14.2 |
| Labor | Steven Donovan | 943 | 45.5 | +7.8 |
| Independent Country | Alma McCorry | 104 | 5.0 | +5.0 |
| Total formal votes | | 2,075 | 98.1 | +1.1 |
| Informal votes | | 40 | 1.9 | −1.1 |
| Turnout | | 2,115 | 56.7 | −1.4 |
Two-party-preferred result
| Country | Tom Harrison | 1,093 | 52.7 | −2.3 |
| Labor | Steven Donovan | 982 | 47.3 | +2.3 |
| Country hold | | Swing | −2.3 | |

=== Elections in the 1910s ===
1917 Western Australian state election: Avon
| Party | Candidate | Votes | % | ±% |
|---|---|---|---|---|
| Labor | Patrick Coffey | 843 | 37.7 | –8.0 |
| National Country | Thomas Harrison | 789 | 35.3 | –19.0 |
| Nationalist | Thomas Duff | 314 | 14.1 | +14.1 |
| Country | William Carroll | 288 | 12.9 | +12.9 |
| Total formal votes | | 2,234 | 97.0 | –2.7 |
| Informal votes | | 68 | 3.0 | +2.7 |
| Turnout | | 2,302 | 58.1 | +0.3 |
Two-party-preferred result
| National Country | Thomas Harrison | 1,228 | 55.0 | +0.7 |
| Labor | Patrick Coffey | 1,006 | 45.0 | –0.7 |
| National Country hold | | Swing | +0.7 | |

- Harrison's designation at the 1914 election was simply "Country", rather than "National Country".

1914 Western Australian state election: Avon
| Party | Candidate | Votes | % | ±% |
|---|---|---|---|---|
| Country | Tom Harrison | 1,318 | 54.3 | +54.3 |
| Labor | Fred Membrey | 1,110 | 45.7 | −7.1 |
| Total formal votes | | 2,428 | 99.7 | +0.1 |
| Informal votes | | 8 | 0.3 | −0.1 |
| Turnout | | 2,436 | 57.7 | +12.1 |
| Country gain from Labor | | Swing | N/A | |

1911 Western Australian state election: Avon
| Party | Candidate | Votes | % | ±% |
|---|---|---|---|---|
| Labor | Thomas Bath | 1,155 | 52.8 | |
| Ministerialist | Hal Colebatch | 1,032 | 47.2 | |
| Total formal votes | | 2,187 | 99.6 | |
| Informal votes | | 8 | 0.4 | |
| Turnout | | 2,195 | 69.8 | |
| Labor win | | (new seat) | | |
