= Members of the Western Australian Legislative Assembly, 1959–1962 =

This is a list of members of the Western Australian Legislative Assembly between the 1959 election and the 1962 election, together known as the 23rd Parliament.

Name	Party	District	Years in office
Hugh Andrew^{[2]}	Labor	Victoria Park	1953–1961
Arthur Bickerton	Labor	Pilbara	1958–1974
Stewart Bovell	Liberal	Vasse	1947–1971
John Brady	Labor	Guildford-Midland	1948–1974
David Brand	Liberal	Greenough	1945–1975
Richard Burt	Liberal	Murchison	1959–1971
George Cornell	Country	Mount Marshall	1947–1967
Charles Court	Liberal	Nedlands	1953–1982
James Craig	Country	Toodyay	1959–1971
Harold Crommelin	Liberal	Claremont	1956–1968
Henry Curran^{[1]}	Labor	South Fremantle	1960–1968
Ron Davies^{[2]}	Labor	Victoria Park	1961–1986
Tom Evans	Labor	Kalgoorlie	1956–1980
Harry Fletcher	Labor	Fremantle	1959–1977
Herb Graham	Labor	East Perth	1943–1973
Bill Grayden	Liberal	South Perth	1947–1949; 1956–1993
Hugh Guthrie	Liberal	Subiaco	1959–1971
Jack Hall	Labor	Albany	1956–1970
Albert Hawke	Labor	Northam	1933–1968
Stanley Heal	Labor	West Perth	1953–1965
John Hearman	Liberal	Blackwood	1950–1968
Bill Hegney	Labor	Mount Hawthorn	1939–1968
James Hegney	Labor	Middle Swan	1930–1947; 1950–1968
Guy Henn	Liberal	Leederville	1959–1971
Ross Hutchinson	Liberal	Cottesloe	1950–1977
Colin Jamieson	Labor	Beeloo	1953–1986
Lionel Kelly	Labor	Merredin-Yilgarn	1941–1968
Dick Lawrence^{[1]}	Labor	South Fremantle	1951–1960
Edgar Lewis	Country	Moore	1958–1974
James Mann	Liberal	Avon Valley	1930–1962
Iven Manning	Liberal	Harvey	1950–1974
William Manning	Country	Narrogin	1956–1974
Harry May	Labor	Collie	1947–1968
Sir Ross McLarty	Liberal	Murray	1930–1962
Arthur Moir	Labor	Boulder	1951–1971
Crawford Nalder	Country	Katanning	1947–1974
Les Nimmo	Liberal	Wembley Beaches	1947–1956; 1959–1968
Daniel Norton	Labor	Gascoyne	1953–1974
Emil Nulsen	Labor	Eyre	1932–1962
Ray O'Connor	Liberal	North Perth	1959–1984
Des O'Neil	Liberal	Canning	1959–1980
Edward Oldfield	Ind. Lib./Labor	Mount Lawley	1951–1965
Ray Owen	Country	Darling Range	1944–1947; 1950–1962
Charles Perkins	Country	Roe	1942–1962
John Rhatigan	Labor	Kimberley	1953–1968
George Roberts	Liberal	Bunbury	1955–1962
Joseph Rowberry	Labor	Warren	1958–1968
Bill Sewell	Labor	Geraldton	1950–1974
Merv Toms	Labor	Maylands	1956–1971
John Tonkin	Labor	Melville	1933–1977
Arthur Watts	Country	Stirling	1935–1962
Gerald Wild	Liberal	Dale	1947–1965

== Notes ==
^{1} On 25 January 1960, the Labor member for South Fremantle, Dick Lawrence, died. Labor candidate Henry Curran won the resulting by-election on 12 March 1960.
^{2} On 1 July 1961, the Labor member for Victoria Park, Hugh Andrew, died. Labor candidate Ron Davies won the resulting by-election on 26 August 1961.

== Sources ==
- "Former Members" (PDF). Parliament of Western Australia. 2011. Archived from the original (PDF) on 7 August 2011.
