= Electoral results for the district of Wembley =

Western Australian district election results

This is a list of electoral results for the Electoral district of Wembley in Western Australian state elections.

== Members for Wembley ==
Member	Party	Term
Guy Henn	Liberal Country League	1962–1968
Guy Henn	Liberal	1968–1971
Ray Young	Liberal	1971–1974

== Election results ==
=== Elections in the 1970s ===
1971 Western Australian state election: Wembley
Party	Candidate	Votes	%	±%
Liberal	Ray Young	6,937	48.0	−52.0
Labor	John Elsegood	5,209	36.0	+36.0
Democratic Labor	Brian Peachey	2,310	16.0	+16.0
Total formal votes		14,456	97.5	
Informal votes		372	2.5	
Turnout		14,828	92.9	
Two-party-preferred result
Liberal	Ray Young	8,899	61.6	−38.4
Labor	John Elsegood	5,557	38.4	+38.4
Liberal hold		Swing	N/A	

=== Elections in the 1960s ===
1968 Western Australian state election: Wembley
Party	Candidate	Votes	%	±%
Liberal and Country	Guy Henn	unopposed		
Liberal and Country hold		Swing		

1965 Western Australian state election: Wembley
Party	Candidate	Votes	%	±%
Liberal and Country	Guy Henn	8,466	69.6	−30.4
Labor	Denis Kemp	3,702	30.4	+30.4
Total formal votes		12,168	98.8	
Informal votes		142	1.2	
Turnout		12,310	94.5	
Liberal and Country hold		Swing	N/A	

1962 Western Australian state election: Wembley
Party	Candidate	Votes	%	±%
Liberal and Country	Guy Henn	unopposed		
Liberal and Country hold		Swing		
