= Electoral results for the district of Bayswater (Western Australia) =

Western Australian district election results

This is a list of electoral results for the Electoral district of Bayswater in Western Australian state elections.

== Members for Bayswater ==
Member	Party	Term
Merv Toms	Labor	1962–1968

== Election results ==
=== Elections in the 1960s ===
1965 Western Australian state election: Bayswater
Party	Candidate	Votes	%	±%
Labor	Merv Toms	6,711	53.8	−46.2
Liberal and Country	Walter Bonnett	5,758	46.2	+46.2
Total formal votes		12,469	96.7	
Turnout		422	3.3	
Turnout		12,891	94.0	
Labor hold		Swing	N/A	

1962 Western Australian state election: Bayswater
Party	Candidate	Votes	%	±%
Labor	Merv Toms	unopposed		
Labor hold		Swing		
