= Terry Kenyon =

Australian politician

Terence "Terry" Kenyon is a former Australian municipal politician. He was a councillor for the west ward of the City of Bayswater in Western Australia between 1993 and 2017. He was mayor between 2005 and 2007, and again between 2009 and 2013. In June 2013, he was recognised as an Honorary Freeman of the City, an honour received after being a councillor continuously for 20 years, among other criteria.

In 2011, Kenyon commenced legal action against fellow councillors Mike Sabatino and Mike Anderton for leaking confidential CCTV video of him. They reached a settlement in 2013. Sabatino and Anderton counter sued in September 2013, alleging Kenyon leaked confidential information about the settlement at a council dinner. They refused to pay for the settlement, arguing that Kenyon broke the terms of their agreement. Kenyon took them to court in November 2013 to try and get them to declare bankruptcy

Between 2011 and 2013, Kenyon was a deputy member of the state's Local Government Advisory Board. Between 2011 and 2014, he was a deputy member of the WA Local Government Grants Commission. He was also a justice of the peace prior to 2020.
