= Electoral results for the district of Ascot =

Western Australian district election results

This is a list of electoral results for the Electoral district of Ascot in Western Australian state elections.

== Members for Ascot ==
Member	Party	Term
Merv Toms	Labor	1968–1971
Mal Bryce	Labor	1971–1988
Eric Ripper	Labor	1988–1989

== Election results ==
=== Elections in the 1980s ===
1988 Ascot state by-election
Party	Candidate	Votes	%	±%
Labor	Eric Ripper	6,252	48.4	−19.8
Liberal	Peter Blaxell	5,188	40.2	+8.4
Independent	Cedric Jacobs	732	5.7	+5.7
Independent	Amedo Misama	581	4.5	+4.5
Independent	Michael Ward	162	1.3	+1.3
Total formal votes		12,915	94.9	−1.5
Informal votes		695	5.1	+1.5
Turnout		13,610	81.8	−10.0
Two-party-preferred result
Labor	Eric Ripper	6,894	53.4	−14.8
Liberal	Peter Blaxell	6,021	46.6	+14.8
Labor hold		Swing	−14.8	

1986 Western Australian state election: Ascot
Party	Candidate	Votes	%	±%
Labor	Mal Bryce	10,163	68.2	−1.7
Liberal	Robert van Straalen	4,739	31.8	+1.7
Total formal votes		14,902	96.4	−1.0
Informal votes		552	3.6	+1.0
Turnout		15,454	91.8	+3.8
Labor hold		Swing	−1.7	

1983 Western Australian state election: Ascot
Party	Candidate	Votes	%	±%
Labor	Mal Bryce	9,733	69.9	
Liberal	Richard Dalgleish	4,201	30.1	
Total formal votes		13,934	97.4	
Informal votes		374	2.6	
Turnout		14,308	88.0	
Labor hold		Swing		

1980 Western Australian state election: Ascot
Party	Candidate	Votes	%	±%
Labor	Mal Bryce	8,184	62.1	+3.1
Liberal	Alam Richardson	4,991	37.9	−3.1
Total formal votes		13,175	95.0	−0.8
Informal votes		696	5.0	+0.8
Turnout		13,871	88.5	−2.3
Labor hold		Swing	+3.1	

=== Elections in the 1970s ===
1977 Western Australian state election: Ascot
Party	Candidate	Votes	%	±%
Labor	Mal Bryce	7,931	59.0	
Liberal	John Bamford	5,518	41.0	
Total formal votes		13,449	95.8	
Informal votes		589	4.2	
Turnout		14,038	90.8	
Labor hold		Swing	−7.4	

1974 Western Australian state election: Ascot
Party	Candidate	Votes	%	±%
Labor	Mal Bryce	8,912	67.2	
Liberal	Robert Carter	4,345	32.8	
Total formal votes		13,257	95.2	
Informal votes		663	4.8	
Turnout		13,920	90.4	
Labor hold		Swing		

1971 Western Australian state election: Ascot
Party	Candidate	Votes	%	±%
Labor	Merv Toms	9,210	75.8	+12.6
Democratic Labor	Albert Ots	2,946	24.2	+24.2
Total formal votes		12,156	93.2	−4.4
Informal votes		885	6.8	+4.4
Turnout		13,041	91.4	−0.2
Labor hold		Swing	N/A	

=== Elections in the 1960s ===
1968 Western Australian state election: Ascot
Party	Candidate	Votes	%	±%
Labor	Merv Toms	7,011	63.2	
Liberal and Country	Douglas Anderson	4,080	36.8	
Total formal votes		11,091	97.6	
Informal votes		277	2.4	
Turnout		11,368	91.6	
Labor hold		Swing		
