= List of mayors of Bayswater =

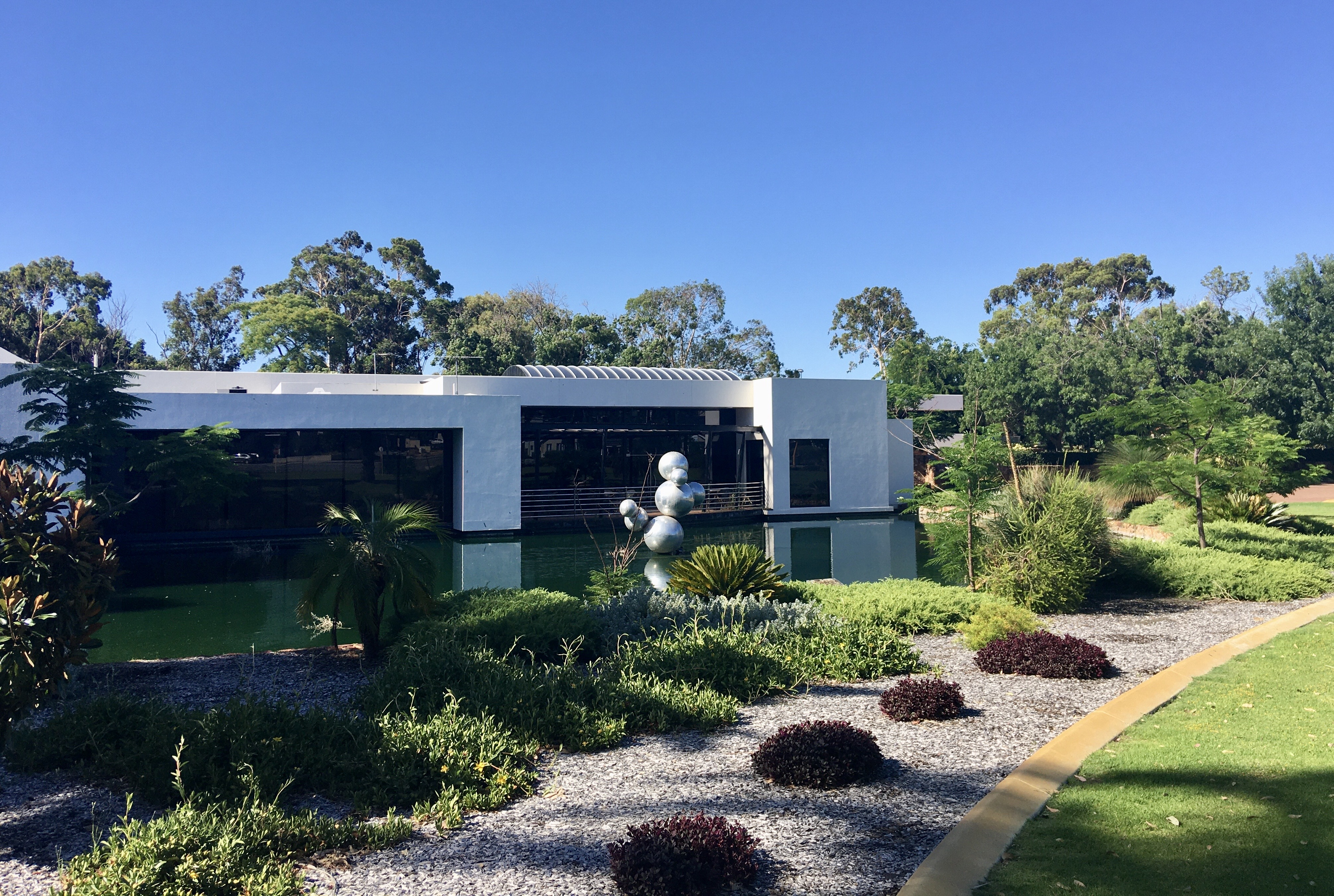
City of Bayswater Civic Centre in January 2022

The City of Bayswater is a local government area in Perth, Western Australia. It was established in 1897 as the Bayswater Road Board, with a chairman elected by the board members as its leader. In 1961, it became the Shire of Bayswater following the passage of the Local Government Act 1960, with a president elected by the councillors as its leader. In 1983, it achieved city status, becoming the City of Bayswater, with a mayor elected by the councillors as its leader. Since 2023, the mayor of the City of Bayswater has been popularly elected rather than elected by the councillors.

The first chairman of Bayswater was Henry Thomas Halliday, who was elected to the position at the board's inaugural meeting on 7 June 1897. He resigned on 20 December 1899. The current mayor of the City of Bayswater is Filomena Piffaretti, who was elected as the city's first female mayor on 18 October 2021. She became the city's first popularly elected mayor in October 2023. Prior to 2023, the mayor was elected by the councillors after each election, making Bayswater is one of the few councils to do so in 2021.

Political parties do not typically endorse candidates in local government in Western Australia. However, councillors are often members of political parties. Dick Ardagh was a member of the Western Australian Legislative Council for the North East Province from 1912 to 1924, serving concurrently as chairman of the Bayswater Road Board from 1920 to 1923, and in 1924. He was a member of the Australian Labor Party until 1917, and a member of the National Labor Party following 1917.

Two mayors/presidents/chairmen have continued on to become members of the Western Australian Legislative Assembly for the Australian Labor Party. Merv Toms was the member for Maylands from 1956 to 1962, member for Bayswater from 1962 to 1968, and member for Ascot from 1968 until his death in 1971. He served on the council during this time as well, albeit not as chairman. John D'Orazio was the member for Ballajura from 2001 to 2008. He left the Labor party in 2006, sitting as an independent politician, before joining again in 2008. He lost preselection for the seat for the 2008 state election, so he contested it as an independent.

Other Bayswater mayors known to have been part of the Labor party include Lou Magro, Terry Kenyon, Barry McKenna, Dan Bull and Filomena Piffaretti. Lou Magro quit the Labor party in May 2008 after failing to be preselected for the electoral district of Morley. Sylvan Albert is known to have been a member of the Liberal Party of Australia, having been their candidate for the electoral district of Maylands at the 2013 Western Australian state election.

Between October 1978 and February 1979, the Shire of Bayswater was run by a state government appointed commissioner, after the council was sacked for mismanagement, corruption and various actions breaking the Local Government Act. As such, the council did not have a mayor during that time.

== Bayswater Road Board ==
Chairman	Term	Ref.
Henry Thomas Halliday	1897–1899	
George Squire Berkley Pickett	1900–1901	
William Leonard Smeed	1901–1902	
Thomas Cherry	1902–1903	
Edward Stevens	1903–1904	
R. H. Beard	1904–1905	
John Donald	1905–1907	
Thomas Beard	1907	
Alfred Archibald West	1907–1909	
John William Williams	1909	
Ivan Granville	1909–1911	
Henry Owen Robinson	1911	
Christian P. Christiansen	1911–1913	
Henry Owen Robinson	1913–1915	
Christian P. Christiansen	1915–1919	
Henry Owen Robinson	1919–1920	
Richard George "Dick" Ardagh	1920–1923	
George Hickling	1923	
Richard George "Dick" Ardagh	1924	
Edgar Rowe	1924–1926	
Albert McGilvray	1926–1934	
James Earl Batey	1934–1935	
J. Andrews	1935–1936	
M. M. Roger	1936–1937	
Roberts V. Hill	1937–1942	
Henry Albert Osborne Hawkins	1942–1947	
Edward Menmuir	1947–1951	
John Mervyn "Merv" Toms	1951–1956	
Christian John Wotzko	1957–1961	

== Shire of Bayswater ==
President	Term	Ref.
Christian John Wotzko	1961–c. 1964	
Robert A. Cook	c. 1964–1975	
Arthur P. Hinds	1975–1978	
Neville Davis	1979–1982	
Carl C. Cardaci	1982–1983	

== City of Bayswater ==
Mayor	Term	Ref.
Carl C. Cardaci	1983–1984	
John D'Orazio	1984–2001	
Lou Magro	2001–2005	
Terry Kenyon	2005–2007	
Lou Magro	2007–2009	
Terry Kenyon	2009–2013	
Sylvan Albert	2013–2015	
Barry McKenna	2015–2017	
Dan Bull	2017–2021	
Filomena Piffaretti	2021–present	
