= Dan Bull (politician) =

Australian politician

Member of the Western Australian Legislative Assembly
- Incumbent
- Assumed office 8 March 2025
- Preceded by: Lisa Baker
- Constituency: Maylands

Mayor of Bayswater
- In office October 2017 – October 2021
- Preceded by: Barry McKenna
- Succeeded by: Filomena Piffaretti

City of Bayswater Councillor
- In office October 2015 – March 2025
- Constituency: West Ward

Personal details
- Born: Victoria
- Party: Labor
- Children: 2
- Education: University of Western Australia
- Occupation: Solicitor
- Website: danbull.org.au

Dan Bull is an Australian politician who has been the member for Maylands in the Western Australian Legislative Assembly since the March 2025 state election. A member of the Labor Party, he was a councillor for the City of Bayswater from 2015 to 2025 and the mayor of Bayswater from 2017 to 2021. Prior to entering politics Bull worked as a solicitor in Perth and Sydney, and was the original keyboard player for Eskimo Joe.

== Early life ==
Bull was born in Victoria to Julie and Ted Bull, a radio presenter, and had two brothers and one sister. Bull moved with his parents to Perth when he was four months old, and grew up in Perth other than one year in Adelaide when he was in year two.

Bull grew up in North Perth, Western Australia, and attended Kyilla Primary School. He then attended Hale School on a music scholarship, Churchlands Senior High School and the University of Western Australia, graduating with a double degree in law and arts. He was admitted to the bar in 2003 and has worked as a solicitor in Perth and Sydney.

Bull began learning the piano at the age of 6. He commenced learning the French Horn in 1989 at the age of 12, studying the instrument throughout his schooling and through to University. He was a member of the Western Australian Youth Orchestra Horn section between 1996 and 1997.

Bull was the keyboardist for the band Eskimo Joe in 2004 and 2005, and was a member of The Sleepy Jackson and End of Fashion.

Bull has released three solo EPs. A self titled EP in 2005, “Nothing Bad Again” in 2006, and “Hanging Up My Mind” in 2008.

Bull gave up being a musician after the birth of his two children.

In June 2005, Bull pleaded guilty to the possession of 1.05 grams (0.037 oz) of cocaine in Sydney. He was given a twelve-month good behaviour bond and was not given a conviction. The following year, Western Australia's State Administrative Tribunal allowed him to continue his career as a lawyer, ruling that his actions were unsatisfactory conduct but that they were out of character.

Bull moved to the Maylands electorate with his family in 2011.

== Political career ==
Bull first ran for the City of Bayswater council in 2015. He said he was interested in local politics because he wanted better road safety, accountability, trees and nature playgrounds. He was elected as a councillor for the west ward in October that year.

Bull is a member of the Labor Party's Left faction and is aligned with the United Workers Union. He was elected mayor by the Bayswater council unopposed after the October 2017 local government election, succeeding Barry McKenna. He was re-elected following the October 2019 local government election. Following the October 2021 local government election, Bull was unexpectedly defeated as mayor by Labor Right member Filomena Piffaretti, who received the support of independent and Liberal-aligned councillors.

Following Labor MP Lisa Baker's announcement that she would not contest the 2025 state election, Bull was preselected to be the Labor Party's candidate to replace Baker in the electoral district of Maylands. In March 2025, he won Maylands with about a 71 percent two-party-preferred vote.

Bull was appointed deputy chair of the Community Development and Justice Standing Committee on 21 May 2025 and as a member of the Joint Standing Committee on the Corruption and Crime Commission on 18 February 2026.

== Personal life ==
Bull is married and has two kids.

In 2023, Bull abseiled down Central Park for charity group Cahoots.

Western Australian Legislative Assembly
Preceded by Lisa Baker	Member for Maylands; 8 March 2025 – present	Incumbent
