= Everard Darlot =

Australian politician

Member of the Legislative Assembly of Western Australia
- In office 29 November 1890 – 18 September 1894
- Succeeded by: E. T. Hooley
- Constituency: Murchison

Personal details
- Born: 23 January 1859 Oakleigh, Victoria, Australia
- Died: 5 November 1937 (aged 78) Perth, Western Australia, Australia

Everard Firebrace Darlot (23 January 1859 – 5 November 1937) was an Australian pastoralist and politician who was a member of the Legislative Assembly of Western Australia from 1890 to 1894, representing the seat of Murchison.

Darlot was born in Oakleigh, Victoria (on the outskirts of Melbourne), and arrived in Western Australia in 1878. His brother Leonard Darlot (who also became an MP) arrived in 1882, and the two initially worked at Beringarra Station, which was owned by their father. Darlot was elected to the Upper Gascoyne Road Board in 1887, and then elected to parliament at the 1890 general election, which was the first to be held for the Legislative Assembly. He was re-elected at the 1894 election, but resigned his seat only a few months later. Beginning in 1893, Darlot and his brother acquired several pastoral leases, including Warrawagine Station, Mount Fraser Station, Byro Station, Melrose Station and Annean Station. In 1906, they sold their other properties and purchased Urella Station (near Mingenew). Darlot eventually retired to Perth, where he died in 1937, aged 78. He had married Harriet Mills in 1885, with whom he had two children. His brother-in-law, Joshua Mills, was also an MP.

Parliament of Western Australia
New creation	Member for Murchison; 1890–1894	Succeeded by E. T. Hooley
