= William Telfer (politician) =

Australian politician

Member of the Legislative Assembly of Western Australia
- In office 20 November 1943 – 15 March 1947
- Preceded by: Ignatius Boyle
- Succeeded by: George Cornell
- Constituency: Avon

Personal details
- Born: 21 August 1885 Gawler, South Australia, Australia
- Died: 25 August 1955 (aged 70) Subiaco, Western Australia, Australia
- Party: Labor

William Francis Telfer (21 August 1885 – 25 August 1955) was an Australian politician who was a member of the Legislative Assembly of Western Australia from 1943 to 1947, representing the seat of Avon.

== Biography ==
Telfer was born in Gawler, South Australia, to Ruth (née Penna) and George Wright Telfer. He and his father came to Western Australia in 1910, settling in the Wheatbelt town of Merredin. Telfer worked as a storekeeper and farmer, and in 1936 was elected to the Merredin Road Board, of which he would remain a member until 1955. From 1938, he served as the road board's chairman. Telfer was elected to parliament at the 1943 state election, defeating the sitting Country member, Ignatius Boyle, by 15 votes. That result was subsequently overturned in the Court of Disputed Returns, but Telfer again defeated Boyle at the resulting by-election. At the 1947 election, which saw the defeat of the four-term Labor government, Telfer lost his seat to the new Country Party candidate, George Cornell. He died in Perth in August 1955, aged 70.

Parliament of Western Australia
Preceded by Ignatius Boyle	Member for Avon; 1943–1947	Succeeded by George Cornell
