= Peter Coyne (politician) =

Australian politician

Member of the Legislative Assembly of Western Australia
- In office 20 February 1971 – 8 February 1986
- Preceded by: Richard Burt
- Succeeded by: Ross Lightfoot
- Constituency: Murchison-Eyre

Personal details
- Born: 6 July 1917 Geraldton, Western Australia, Australia
- Died: 4 November 2001 (aged 84) Osborne Park, Western Australia, Australia
- Party: Liberal

Peter Joseph Aloysius Coyne (6 July 1917 – 4 November 2001) was an Australian politician who was a Liberal Party member of the Legislative Assembly of Western Australia from 1971 to 1986, representing the seat of Murchison-Eyre.

Coyne was born in Geraldton, a port city in Western Australia's Mid West region, but his family moved to Yalgoo soon after his birth. After leaving school, he worked as a miner and metallurgist, and then at Agnew as a storekeeper. Coyne enlisted in the Royal Australian Air Force in 1941, and during the war served as a radio technician, eventually reaching the rank of flight sergeant. After the war's end, he returned to Agnew for a period, and then went to live in Perth, where he also worked as a storekeeper, television salesman, and life insurance salesman. Coyne entered parliament at the 1971 state election, succeeding the retiring Richard Burt as the member for Murchison-Eyre. He retired at the 1986 election, having served as deputy chairman of committees from 1980 to 1981, and died in Perth in 2001, aged 84.

Parliament of Western Australia
Preceded by Richard Burt	Member for Murchison-Eyre; 1971–1986	Succeeded by Ross Lightfoot
