= Ignatius Boyle =

Australian politician

- Born: 1 January 1882; Fremantle, Western Australia
- Died: 15 June 1960 (aged 78); Mount Lawley, Western Australia
- Education: CBC Perth
- Occupation: Politician
- Spouse: Catherine Mary Murphy
- Children: Four
- Parent(s): Francis William Boyle & Ellen Kelly

Ignatius George Boyle (1 January 1882 – 15 June 1960) was a politician from Western Australia who represented the Avon district in the Western Australian Legislative Assembly from 1935 until 1943.

== Biography ==
Boyle was educated at St Joseph's Convent, Fremantle and Christian Brothers College, Perth, and left school in 1897 for a job in the Western Australian Government Railways.

He married Catherine Mary Murphy on 9 September 1908, together they had four children.

Boyle was an elected member of the Albany Municipal Council from 1915 until 1920. He then moved to Toodyay and sat on the Toodyay Shire Council for some years, including two years (1928−1930) as its chairman. He stood for the Legislative Assembly seat of Toodyay in 1924 and 1927, on both occasions losing to fellow Country Party member and minister, John Lindsay. When Lindsay transferred to Mount Marshall, Boyle tried again but was beaten by another Country Party candidate, Lindsay Thorn.

Boyle was president of the Wheatgrowers' Union from 1931 to 1935 and chairman of directors of its newsletter, The Wheatgrower.

In May 1935, he accepted the Country Party's nomination to contest a by-election for the seat of Avon following the death of Harry Griffiths. He served as the member for Avon until the 1943 election, at which time he was defeated by a 15-vote margin by the Labor candidate William Telfer. He appealed against the result to the Court of Disputed Returns, who ordered a fresh election, but Telfer won by 298 votes at the by-election on 1 June 1944. He stood unsuccessfully for the Senate two years later.

Boyle died on 15 June 1960 and was buried in Karrakatta Cemetery.
