= William Marshall (Australian politician) =

Australian politician

Member of the Legislative Assembly of Western Australia
- In office 12 March 1921 – 19 August 1952
- Preceded by: John Holman
- Succeeded by: Everard O'Brien
- Constituency: Murchison

Personal details
- Born: 22 June 1885 North Creswick, Victoria, Australia
- Died: 19 August 1952 (aged 67) Darwin, Northern Territory, Australia
- Party: Labor

William Mortimer Marshall (22 June 1885 – 19 August 1952) was an Australian politician who was a Labor Party member of the Legislative Assembly of Western Australia from 1921 until his death, representing the seat of Murchison. He served as a minister in the government of Frank Wise.

Marshall was born in North Creswick, Victoria, a small town near Ballarat. His work as a miner took him to Malaya and Rhodesia, and eventually to Western Australia, where he was employed on the mines at Lawlers and Youanmi. Marshall eventually settled in Meekatharra, where he worked as a locomotive driver. He joined the Labor Party in 1915, and at the 1921 state election was elected to the seat of Murchison, having defeated the sitting member, John Holman, for preselection. After the 1939 election, Marshall was appointed chairman of committees in the Legislative Assembly. When Frank Wise replaced John Willcock as premier in 1945, he was elevated to the ministry, becoming Minister for Mines, Minister for Railways, and Minister for Transport. He held his titles until Labor's defeat at the 1947 election. While on a health trip on the MV Kabbarli in August 1952, Marshall was taken ill and put ashore at Darwin, where he would die in hospital. His cousin, Bob Marshall, was a billiards world champion and briefly also a member of parliament.

Parliament of Western Australia
Preceded by John Holman	Member for Murchison; 1921–1952	Succeeded by Everard O'Brien
Political offices
Preceded by Alexander Panton	Minister for Mines; 1945–1947	Succeeded by Hubert Parker
Preceded by Emil Nulsen	Minister for Railways; 1945–1947	Succeeded by Harrie Seward
New creation	Minister for Transport; 1945–1947	Succeeded by Harrie Seward
