= Everard O'Brien =

Australian politician

Member of the Legislative Assembly of Western Australia
- In office 8 November 1952 – 21 March 1959
- Preceded by: William Marshall
- Succeeded by: Richard Burt
- Constituency: Murchison

Personal details
- Born: 9 April 1907 Nunngarra, Western Australia, Australia
- Died: 17 August 1971 (aged 64) Fremantle, Western Australia, Australia
- Party: Labor

Everard McDonnell O'Brien (9 April 1907 – 17 August 1971) was an Australian politician who was a Labor Party member of the Legislative Assembly of Western Australia from 1952 to 1959, representing the seat of Murchison.

O'Brien was born in Nunngarra, a locality near the town of Sandstone in Western Australia's Mid West region. He went to school in Mount Margaret, and afterward worked as a labourer and shearer. In the 1930s, he went to live in Perth, working initially as a labourer and later as a rail and tram conductor. O'Brien returned to the Mid West in the 1940s, prospecting at Big Bell for a period and later serving as secretary of the Yalgoo Road Board. He first ran for parliament at a 1947 Legislative Council by-election for Central Province, but lost to the Liberal Party's Harold Daffen. O'Brien eventually entered parliament at the 1952 Murchison by-election, which was caused by the death of the sitting Labor member, William Marshall. He was re-elected at the 1953 and 1956 state elections, but at the 1959 election was defeated by the Liberal candidate, Richard Burt. O'Brien remained in Perth after leaving parliament, dying there in August 1971, aged 64. He married twice, and had seven children in total, one of whom, Simon O'Brien, became a Liberal member of parliament.

Parliament of Western Australia
Preceded by William Marshall	Member for Murchison; 1952–1959	Succeeded by Richard Burt
