= City of Bayswater =

Coordinates: 31°53′13″S 115°54′25″E

- Local government area
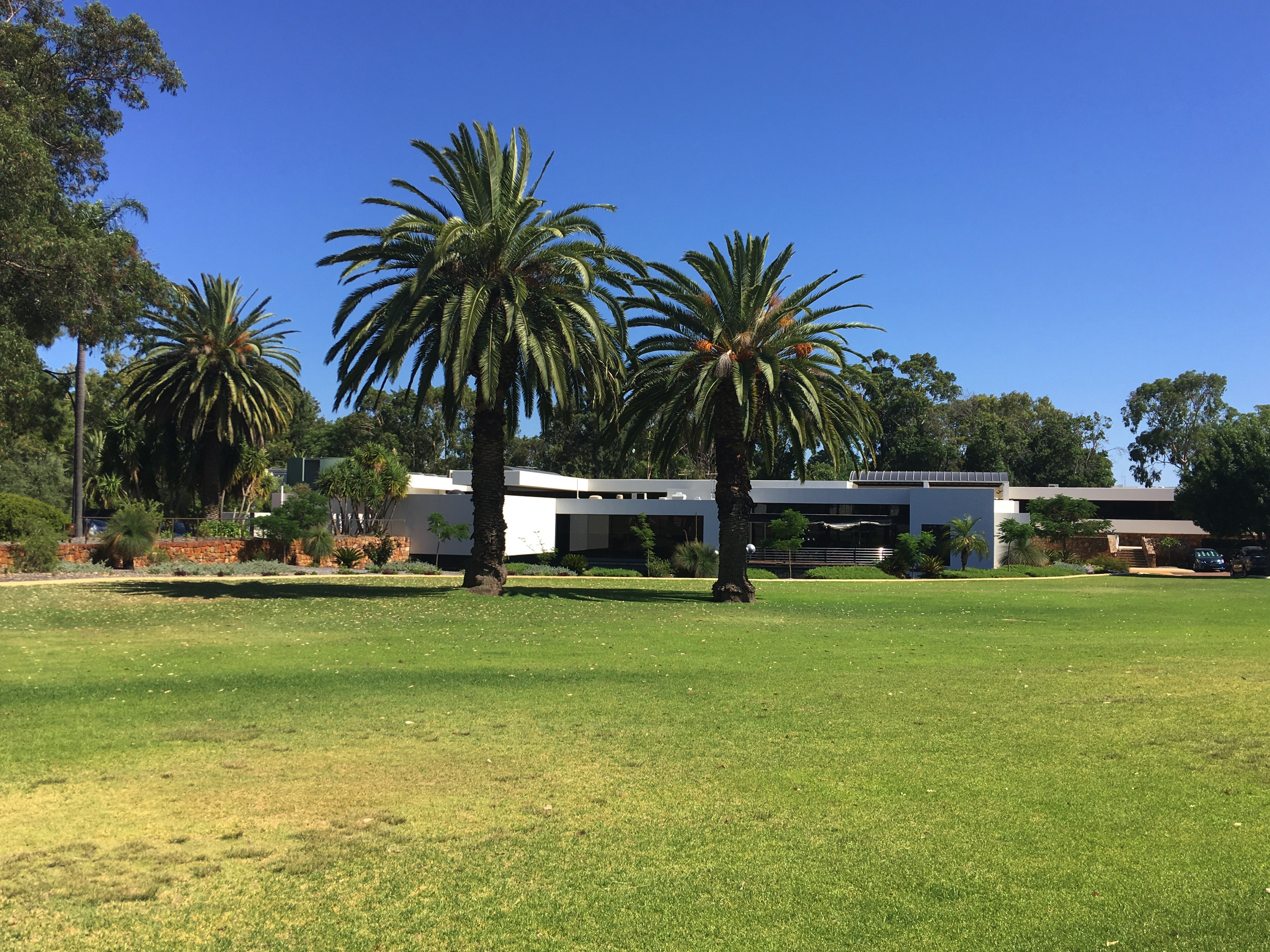
- City of Bayswater Civic Centre

- Interactive map of City of Bayswater
- Country: Australia
- State: Western Australia
- Region: Eastern Metropolitan Perth
- Established: 1897
- Council seat: Morley

Government
  - Mayor: Filomena Piffaretti
  - State electorate: Maylands, Bassendean, Morley
  - Federal division: Division of Perth

Area
  - Total: 34.6 km^{2} (13.4 sq mi)

Population
  - Total: 69,283 (LGA 2021)
- Website: City of Bayswater
LGAs around City of Bayswater
Stirling	Swan	Swan
Stirling	City of Bayswater	Bassendean
Vincent	Victoria Park	Belmont

The City of Bayswater is a local government area in the Western Australian capital city of Perth, about 7 kilometres (4 mi) northeast of Perth's central business district. The city covers an area of 34.6 square kilometres (13.4 sq mi) and had a population of 69,283 as at the 2021 Census. The City of Bayswater is a member of the Eastern Metropolitan Regional Council.

== History ==
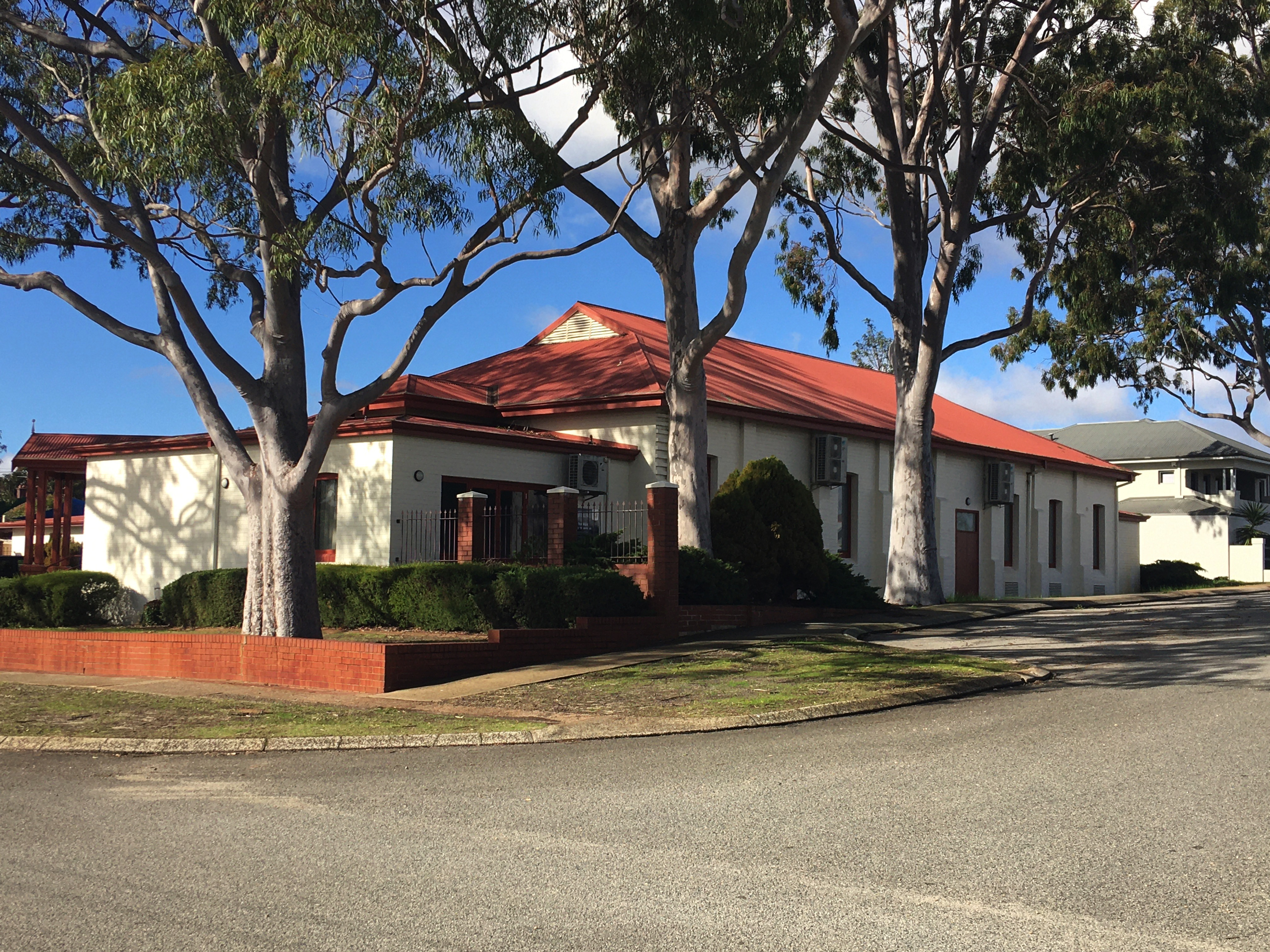
Bayswater Drill Hall, office for the Roads Board from 1907 to 1914

In the 1890s, Bayswater was a small settlement, awkwardly straddling the boundaries of the Perth and Swan Road Districts. In December 1894, residents held a meeting to petition for a road board. The government rejected the petition. A second attempt to get Bayswater's own road board in 1896 was successful. Both the Perth and Swan Road Boards were happy to relinquish responsibility for building roads there. The Bayswater Road Board was gazetted on 5 March 1897, becoming one of several new local government areas established in the 1890s along the railway. A wooden ratepayers' hall was constructed on Guildford Road.

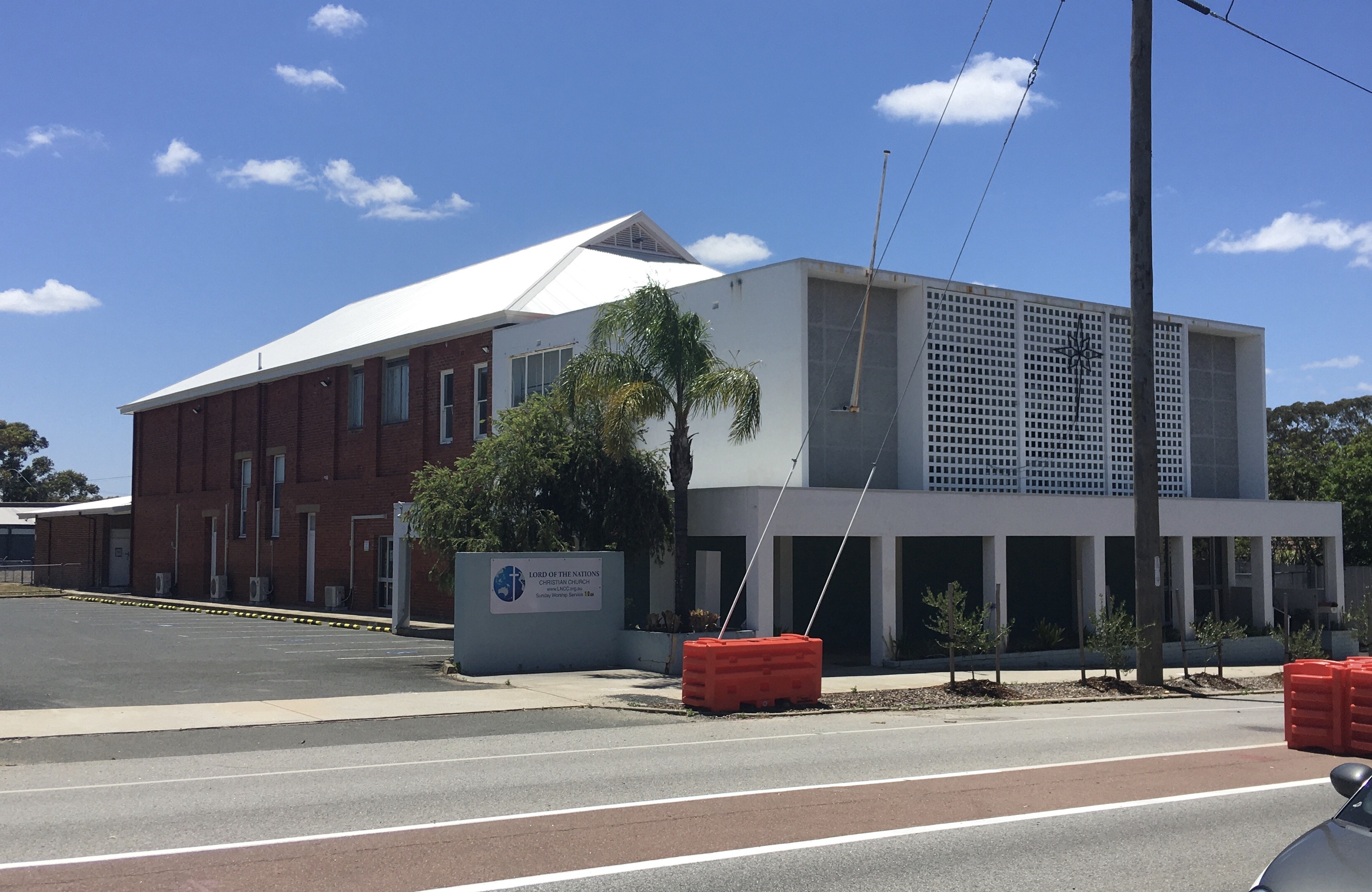
Roads Board office from 1914 to 1983. It has since been used as a church

In 1944, at the annual ratepayers' meeting, a majority of the seven ratepayers that attended voted for the board to change the district's name to "Oakleigh Park Road District". The name Bayswater was considered to obstruct progress due to its working-class connotations. After advertising for objections to the change in name, many came in and the idea was ditched. On 1 July 1961, it became a shire following the enactment of the Local Government Act 1960.

In October 1978, the shire council was sacked by the Government of Western Australia for mismanagement, corruption and various actions breaking the Local Government Act. The shire sold council property and several large contracts without tenders. A commissioner was placed in charge of the council for five months. At the next council election on 24 February 1979, 80% of ratepayers voted, much higher than the usual 30%. Only two of the councillors elected had been councillors before.

On 29 October 1983, it attained city status. Around this same time, it relocated its administration from Bayswater to its present location on Broun Avenue in Morley. In 1998 the suburb of Maylands was transferred into the City of Bayswater from the City of Stirling.

The portion of the suburb of Noranda north of Widgee Road was transferred to the City of Bayswater from the City of Swan on 1 July 2016.

== Logo ==
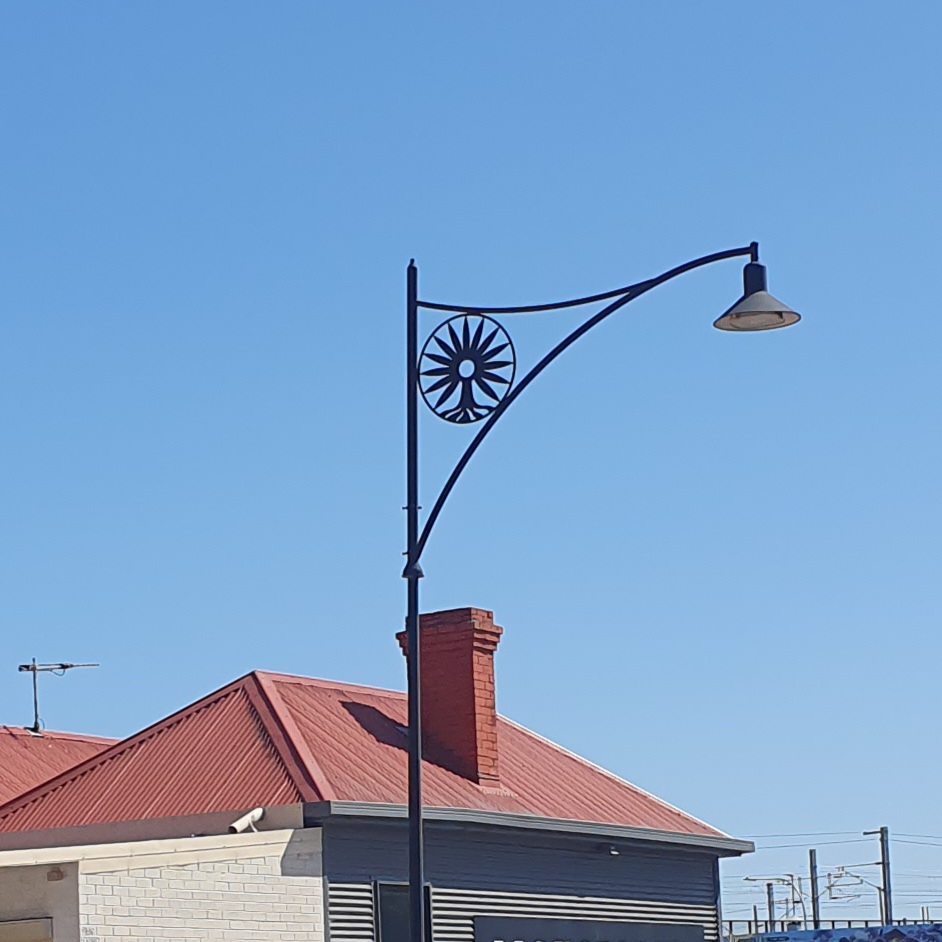
A Streetlight in Bayswater using the city's logo.

The City of Bayswater's logo features an olive tree, which has history relating to Bayswater. In the 1840s, an olive tree was planted on Slade Street. The tree is still standing today, and it is the earliest sign of European occupation in the area.

== Services ==
The City of Bayswater has three libraries. They are in Maylands, Bayswater and Morley. The city also owns The RISE, Bayswater Waves, Maylands Waterland and Morley Sport and Recreation Centre.

== Wards ==
The city is divided into four wards. The mayor and deputy mayor are each elected from among the councillors. Elections are held on the third Saturday in October every odd year, with councillors elected to four-year terms. Approximately half of all positions are up for election at each election.

Political parties do not typically endorse candidates in local government in Western Australia. However, elected members are required to disclose membership of any political party.

Ward	Councillor	Joined council	Term	Notes
Central	Assunta Meleca	2021	2025	
Central	Steven Ostaszewskyj	2019	2023	
Central	Sally Palmer	2015	2023	Member of the Australian Greens
North	Josh Eveson	2021	2025	
North	Filomena Piffaretti	2017	2025	Mayor since 2021, Member of the Australian Labor Party
North	Michelle Sutherland	2018	2023	Member of the Liberal Party of Australia
South	Catherine Ehrhardt	2015	2023	Deputy Mayor since 2021
South	Elli Petersen-Pik	2017	2025	
West	Dan Bull	2015	2023	Member of the Australian Labor Party
West	Lorna Clarke	2017	2025	WA State President of the Australian Labor Party
West	Giorgia Johnson	2017	2025	Formerly a member of the Australian Greens

== Suburbs ==
The suburbs of the City of Bayswater with population and size figures based on the most recent Australian census:

Suburb	Population	Area	Map
Bayswater	15,288 (SAL 2021)	9.8 km^{2} (3.8 sq mi)	
Bedford	5,716 (SAL 2021)	2.3 km^{2} (0.89 sq mi)	
Dianella *	24,169 (SAL 2021)	10.8 km^{2} (4.2 sq mi)	
Embleton	3,600 (SAL 2021)	1.7 km^{2} (0.66 sq mi)	
Maylands	13,199 (SAL 2021)	5.0 km^{2} (1.9 sq mi)	
Morley	22,539 (SAL 2021)	10.4 km^{2} (4.0 sq mi)	
Mount Lawley *	11,328 (SAL 2021)	4.4 km^{2} (1.7 sq mi)	
Noranda	8,002 (SAL 2021)	4.9 km^{2} (1.9 sq mi)	

* indicates suburb partially located within city

== Population ==
Historical population

Year	Pop.	±% p.a.
1911	1,790	—
1921	2,392	+2.94%
1933	4,138	+4.67%
1947	6,453	+3.22%
1954	14,555	+12.32%
1961	19,296	+4.11%
1966	26,112	+6.24%
1971	34,261	+5.58%
1976	38,302	+2.25%

Year	Pop.	±% p.a.
1981	38,526	+0.12%
1986	41,331	+1.42%
1991	43,810	+1.17%
1996	43,573	−0.11%
2001	54,008	+4.39%
2006	55,801	+0.66%
2011	61,262	+1.88%
2016	64,677	+1.09%
2021	69,283	+1.39%

== Heritage listed places ==
As of 2024, 401 places are heritage-listed in the City of Bayswater, of which 24 are on the State Register of Heritage Places, among them Tranby House, the Albany Bell Castle and the Garratt Road Bridge.

== See also ==
- List of mayors of Bayswater
