= 1962 Western Australian state election =

- 31 March 1962

All 50 seats in the Western Australian Legislative Assembly 26 Assembly seats were needed for a majority
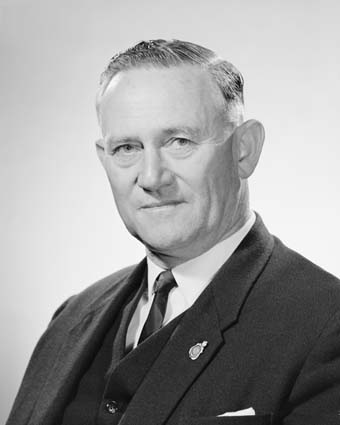

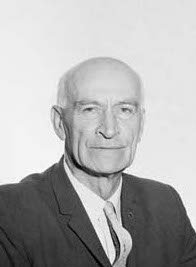
	First party	Second party
Leader	David Brand	Albert Hawke
Party	Liberal/Country coalition	Labor
Leader since	1 March 1957	3 July 1951
Leader's seat	Greenough	Northam
Last election	25 seats	23 seats
Seats won	26 seats	24 seats
Seat change	▲1	▲1
Percentage	46.09%	44.41%
Swing	▲3.07	▼0.51
Premier before election
David Brand
Liberal/Country coalition
Elected Premier
David Brand
Liberal/Country coalition

Elections were held in the state of Western Australia on 31 March 1962 to elect all 50 members to the Legislative Assembly. The Liberal-Country coalition government, led by Premier Sir David Brand, won a second term in office against the Labor Party, led by Opposition Leader Albert Hawke.

The election resulted in a confirmation of the status quo, with the only apparent seat changes since the 1959 election being due to the changes of affiliation of the two Independent Liberal members. Edward Oldfield, representing Mount Lawley, had joined the Labor Party during the previous term, whilst Bill Grayden, representing South Perth, had joined the Liberal Party. Both were re-elected.

Two seats changed between the Country and LCL Parties. In Avon, the sitting member James Mann (LCL) retired after 32 years in Parliament, and Harry Gayfer, one of the two Country Party candidates, succeeded him in the seat. Meanwhile, in outer-metropolitan Darling Range, LCL candidate Ken Dunn defeated the sitting Country member Ray Owen. The Labor candidate (Jack Metcalfe) narrowly won the primary vote, whilst Dunn polled one vote ahead of Owen, meaning Owen was eliminated and his votes distributed between Dunn and Metcalfe. A petition was filed and the Court of Disputed Returns ordered a fresh election for 22 July 1962, which widened the gap to 15 votes.

== Results ==
Western Australian state election, 31 March 1962 Legislative Assembly << 1959–1965 >>
Enrolled voters	319,594^{[1]}				
Votes cast	297,520		Turnout	93.09%	+1.05%
Informal votes	5,324		Informal	1.79%	–0.79%
Summary of votes by party
Party	Primary votes	%	Swing	Seats	Change
Labor	129,757	44.41%	–0.51%	24	+ 1
Liberal and Country	120,267	41.16%	+3.68%	18	+ 1
Country	17,339	5.93%	–0.61%	8	± 0
Democratic Labor	6,601	2.26%	–2.86%	0	± 0
Ind. Lib.	4,556	1.56%	–2.26%	0	– 2
Communist	1,201	0.41%	–0.43%	0	± 0
Independent	12,475	4.27%	+2.99%	0	± 0
Total	292,196			50	

^{1} 381,805 electors were enrolled to vote at the election, but 11 seats (22% of the total) were uncontested—4 Labor seats (two more than 1959) representing 29,773 enrolled voters, 4 LCL seats (one less than 1959) representing 26,836 enrolled voters, and 3 Country seats (one less than 1959) representing 15,532 enrolled voters.

== Post-election pendulum ==
LCL/Country seats (26)
Marginal
Karrinyup	Les Nimmo	LCL	2.5%
Subiaco	Hugh Guthrie	LCL	2.6%
Bunbury	George Roberts	LCL	3.7%
Fairly safe
Cottesloe	Ross Hutchinson	LCL	6.8%
Avon	Harry Gayfer	CP	7.2% v LCL
Mount Lawley	Ray O'Connor	LCL	8.4%
Dale	Gerald Wild	LCL	8.6%
Darling Range	Ken Dunn	LCL	8.6%
Safe
Murchison	Richard Burt	LCL	10.9%
Stirling	Clayton Mitchell	CP	12.7% v IND
East Melville	Des O'Neil	LCL	13.6%
Claremont	Harold Crommelin	LCL	18.2% v IND
Toodyay	James Craig	CP	18.3%
Murray	Ross McLarty	LCL	18.7% v IND
Roe	Tom Hart	CP	19.7% v LCL
Nedlands	Charles Court	LCL	21.4%
Blackwood	John Hearman	LCL	24.1% v IND
Greenough	David Brand	LCL	45.4% v COM
South Perth	Bill Grayden	LCL	undist.
Katanning	Crawford Nalder	CP	unopp.
Moore	Edgar Lewis	CP	unopp.
Mount Marshall	George Cornell	CP	unopp.
Narrogin	William Manning	CP	unopp.
Vasse	William Bovell	LCL	unopp.
Wellington	Iven Manning	LCL	unopp.
Wembley	Guy Henn	LCL	unopp.

Labor seats (24)
Marginal
Canning	Donald May	ALP	1.0%
Maylands	Edward Oldfield	ALP	1.4%
Perth	Stanley Heal	ALP	4.3%
Warren	Joseph Rowberry	ALP	5.9%
Fairly safe
Balcatta	Herb Graham	ALP	6.0%
Mount Hawthorn	Bill Hegney	ALP	6.2%
Merredin-Yilgarn	Lionel Kelly	ALP	8.1%
Beeloo	Colin Jamieson	ALP	9.7%
Safe
Melville	John Tonkin	ALP	11.3%
Victoria Park	Ron Davies	ALP	13.9%
Albany	Jack Hall	ALP	14.3%
Collie	Harry May	ALP	15.9%
Cockburn	Henry Curran	ALP	16.1%
Boulder-Eyre	Arthur Moir	ALP	16.7%
Fremantle	Harry Fletcher	ALP	19.0%
Kalgoorlie	Tom Evans	ALP	26.3%
Kimberley	John Rhatigan	ALP	28.7% v IND
Swan	John Brady	ALP	41.8% v COM
Belmont	James Hegney	ALP	undist.
Geraldton	Bill Sewell	ALP	undist.
Bayswater	Merv Toms	ALP	unopp.
Gascoyne	Daniel Norton	ALP	unopp.
Northam	Albert Hawke	ALP	unopp.
Pilbara	Arthur Bickerton	ALP	unopp.

== See also ==
- Members of the Western Australian Legislative Assembly, 1959–1962
- Members of the Western Australian Legislative Assembly, 1962–1965
- Candidates of the 1962 Western Australian state election
