= Electoral district of Wembley =

Former electoral district of Western Australia

Wembley Western Australia—Legislative Assembly
- State: Western Australia
- Dates current: 1962–1974
- Namesake: Wembley

The Electoral district of Wembley was a Legislative Assembly electorate in the state of Western Australia. The district was named for the inner western Perth suburb of Wembley, which fell within its borders.

Wembley was largely created out of the abolished Leederville and metropolitan sections of Wembley Beaches by a redistribution prior to the 1962 election, and was held by the Liberal Party for its entire duration.

The seat was abolished ahead of the 1974 election, and the last member for Wembley, Ray Young, contested and won the seat of Scarborough.

== Members for Wembley ==
Member	Party	Term
Guy Henn	Liberal Country League	1962–1968
Guy Henn	Liberal	1968–1971
Ray Young	Liberal	1971–1974

== See also ==
- Wembley, Western Australia
- Electoral district of Wembley Beaches
