= Electoral district of Bayswater (Western Australia) =

Former electoral district of Perth, Western Australia

Bayswater Western Australia—Legislative Assembly
- State: Western Australia
- Dates current: 1962–1968
- Namesake: Bayswater

Bayswater was an electoral district of the Legislative Assembly in the Australian state of Western Australia from 1962 to 1968.

The district was based in the eastern suburbs of Perth. First contested at the 1962 state election, it was held for two terms by Merv Toms of the Labor Party, hitherto the member for Maylands.

Bayswater was abolished at the 1968 state election, and Toms went on to become member for the new seat of Ascot.

== Members for Bayswater ==
Member	Party	Term
Merv Toms	Labor	1962–1968
