= Guy Henn =

Australian politician

Dr Guy Henn

Member of the Legislative Assembly of Western Australia
- In office 21 March 1959 – 1 March 1962
- Preceded by: Ted Johnson
- Succeeded by: None (seat abolished)
- Constituency: Leederville
- In office 1 March 1962 – 20 February 1971
- Preceded by: None (new seat)
- Succeeded by: Ray Young
- Constituency: Wembley

Personal details
- Born: 25 September 1909 Beckenham, Kent, England
- Died: 22 April 1998 (aged 88) Wembley, Western Australia
- Party: Liberal

Guy Gavin Henn (25 September 1909 – 22 April 1998) was an Australian medical doctor and politician who was a Liberal Party member of the Legislative Assembly of Western Australia from 1959 to 1971.

Henn was born in Beckenham, Kent, England, to Jean (née Elliott) and Percy Umfreville Henn. His family moved to Western Australia the year after his birth, where his father became headmaster of Guildford Grammar School. Henn initially attended his father's school, but was then sent to England to finish his secondary education, attending Lancing College in Sussex. He went on to study medicine at St Thomas' Hospital, London, although his medical training was interrupted by a two-year spell in Australia, which was spent working on sheep stations in the North West. In 1941, Henn enlisted as a medical officer in the British Merchant Navy, although he transferred to the Royal Australian Air Force (RAAF) the following year, with which he spent the rest of the war.

After the war's end, Henn settled in Perth. He initially worked as a general practitioner in Midland and Wembley, and later as the chief medical officer at the Repatriation General Hospital, Hollywood. Henn entered parliament at the 1959 state election, winning the seat of Leederville from the sitting Labor member, Ted Johnson. At the 1962 election, his seat was abolished and he transferred to the new seat of Wembley, which he held for the rest of his career. Henn retired from parliament at the 1971 election, and subsequently worked as the chief medical officer for a life insurance company. He died in Perth in 1998, aged 88. He had married Maureen O'Malley in 1941, with whom he had two children.

Parliament of Western Australia
Preceded by Ted Johnson	Member for Leederville; 1959–1962	Abolished
New seat	Member for Wembley; 1962–1971	Succeeded by Ray Young
