= Merv Toms =

Australian politician

The Honourable Merv Toms

19th Speaker of the Legislative Assembly of Western Australia
- In office 15 July 1971 – 8 October 1971
- Preceded by: Hugh Guthrie
- Succeeded by: Daniel Norton

Member of the Legislative Assembly of Western Australia
- In office 7 April 1956 – 1 March 1962
- Preceded by: Edward Oldfield
- Succeeded by: Edward Oldfield
- Constituency: Maylands
- In office 1 March 1962 – 23 March 1968
- Preceded by: None (new creation)
- Succeeded by: None (abolished)
- Constituency: Bayswater
- In office 23 March 1968 – 8 October 1971
- Preceded by: None (new creation)
- Succeeded by: Mal Bryce
- Constituency: Ascot

Personal details
- Born: 23 January 1909 Boulder, Western Australia, Australia
- Died: 8 October 1971 (aged 62) Nedlands, Western Australia, Australia
- Party: Labor

John Mervin Toms (23 January 1909 – 8 October 1971) was an Australian politician who was a Labor Party member of the Legislative Assembly of Western Australia from 1956 to 1971. He was appointed Speaker of the Legislative Assembly in July 1971, but served only a few months before dying in office.

== Early life ==
Toms was born in Boulder, Western Australia, to Lucy (née Kent) and John Pryor Toms. He moved to Perth during his childhood, attending Midland High School. Toms left school at the age of 15, initially working as a labourer and later as a carpenter and joiner. He married Winifred Ann Jenkinson in 1933, with whom he had three children. Toms was elected to the Bayswater Road Board in April 1944, and would serve on the council until May 1971, including as chairman from 1951 to 1956. He was recognised as an Honorary Freeman of the City in December 1971 due to his service on the board, and has the Mertome Village aged care complex named after him. He was also prominent in the Building Workers' Industrial Union, a forerunner of the CFMEU.

== Politics ==
Toms entered parliament at the 1956 state election, easily winning the seat of Maylands. At the 1962 election, he transferred to the new seat of Bayswater. When Bayswater was abolished at the 1968 election, he switched seats for a second time, winning the newly created seat of Ascot. Toms was subsequently appointed deputy chairman of committees in the Legislative Assembly.

Following Labor's victory at the 1971 election, Toms was elected to the speakership. His elevation meant that the government and opposition had equal numbers on the floor of the Legislative Assembly, so he made frequent use of his casting vote as speaker. During a sitting in October 1971, Toms collapsed and was rushed to Sir Charles Gairdner Hospital, where he died. Because his death reduced Labor to a minority government, the premier, John Tonkin, advised the governor, Sir Douglas Kendrew, to prorogue parliament until the necessary by-election had been held (which Labor won).

== See also ==
- James Lee-Steere, the only other speaker to die in office

Parliament of Western Australia
Preceded by Edward Oldfield	Member for Maylands; 1956–1962	Succeeded by Edward Oldfield
New creation	Member for Bayswater; 1962–1968	Abolished
New creation	Member for Ascot; 1968–1971	Succeeded by Mal Bryce
Preceded by Hugh Guthrie	Speaker of the Legislative Assembly; 1971	Succeeded by Daniel Norton
