= George Cornell (politician) =

Australian politician

Member of the Legislative Assembly of Western Australia
- In office 15 March 1947 – 3 March 1950
- Preceded by: William Telfer
- Succeeded by: None (abolished)
- Constituency: Avon
- In office 3 March 1950 – 6 July 1967
- Preceded by: Hugh Leslie
- Succeeded by: Ray McPharlin
- Constituency: Mount Marshall

Personal details
- Born: 3 September 1910 Boulder, Western Australia, Australia
- Died: 6 July 1967 (aged 56) Scarborough, Western Australia, Australia
- Party: Country

George Meredith Cornell (3 September 1910 – 6 July 1967) was an Australian politician who was a Country Party member of the Legislative Assembly of Western Australia from 1947 until his death. He served as a minister in the government of Sir David Brand.

== Biography ==
Cornell was born in Boulder, Western Australia, to Mary Ann (née Daws) and James Cornell. His father was also a member of parliament. Cornell was raised in Perth, and after leaving school studied accounting. He worked for periods at the Bank of Western Australia and the Agricultural Bank of Western Australia, and later at private firms in Perth and Kellerberrin (a small Wheatbelt town). Cornell served on the Kellerberrin Road Board from 1942 to 1947, including as chairman from 1945 to 1947. He entered parliament at the 1947 state election, defeating the sitting Labor member, William Telfer, in the seat of Avon.

At the 1950 election, Cornell's seat was abolished, and he transferred to the nearby seat of Mount Marshall. In 1961, following the death of Charles Perkins, he was elevated to the ministry, becoming Minister for Transport, Minister for Police, and Minister for Native Welfare in the Brand government. However, he served as a minister for less than six months, leaving cabinet after the 1962 state election. Having been returned unopposed at six consecutive elections, Cornell died in office in July 1967, as the result of a road accident outside his home in Scarborough. He had married Mollie Gladys Pope in 1940, with whom he had five sons.

Parliament of Western Australia
Preceded by William Telfer	Member for Avon; 1947–1950	Abolished
Preceded by Hugh Leslie	Member for Mount Marshall; 1950–1967	Succeeded by Ray McPharlin
Political offices
Preceded by Charles Perkins	Minister for Transport; 1961–1962	Succeeded by James Craig
Preceded by Charles Perkins	Minister for Police; 1961–1962	Succeeded by James Craig
Preceded by Charles Perkins	Minister for Native Welfare; 1961–1962	Succeeded by Edgar Lewis
