= Electoral district of Murchison-Eyre =

Former state electoral district of Western Australia

Murchison-Eyre Western Australia—Legislative Assembly
- State: Western Australia
- Dates current: 1890–1989^{1}; 2005–2008
- Namesake: Murchison region; Edward John Eyre

Footnotes
- ^{1} known as Murchison 1890–1968

Murchison-Eyre was an electoral district of the Legislative Assembly in the Australian state of Western Australia from 1890 to 1989 and again from 2005 to 2008.

Known as Murchison until 1968, it was one of the original 30 seats contested at the 1890 election. The district was located in the Western Australian outback. The seat was abolished ahead of the 1989 election.

Revived for the 2005 election, Murchison-Eyre was won by Labor candidate John Bowler, previously a member for the abolished Eyre. The district lasted one term before it was abolished ahead of the 2008 election. Its former territory was divided between the districts of Eyre, Kalgoorlie, North West, and Pilbara. Bowler, by this time an independent, successfully contested the seat of Kalgoorlie.

== Members for Murchison-Eyre ==
Murchison (1890–1968)
Member	Party	Term
Everard Darlot	Ministerial	1890–1894
E. T. Hooley	Ministerial	1894–1897
Samuel Mitchell	Ministerial	1897–1901
John Nanson	Ministerial	1901–1904
John Holman	Labor	1904–1921
William Marshall	Labor	1921–1952
Everard O'Brien	Labor	1952–1959
Richard Burt	LCL	1959–1968
Murchison-Eyre (1968–1989)
Member	Party	Term
Richard Burt	Liberal	1968–1971
Peter Coyne	Liberal	1971–1986
Ross Lightfoot	Liberal	1986–1989
Murchison-Eyre (2005–2008)
Member	Party	Term
John Bowler	Labor	2005–2006
John Bowler	Independent	2006–2008
