= Richard Burt (politician) =

Australian businessman and politician

Member of the Legislative Assembly of Western Australia
- In office 21 March 1959 – 23 March 1968
- Preceded by: Everard O'Brien
- Succeeded by: None (seat abolished)
- Constituency: Murchison
- In office 23 March 1968 – 20 February 1971
- Preceded by: None (new seat)
- Succeeded by: Peter Coyne
- Constituency: Murchison-Eyre

Personal details
- Born: 23 September 1909 Cottesloe, Western Australia
- Died: 7 November 1993 (aged 84) Claremont, Western Australia
- Party: Liberal

Richard Paull Septimus Burt (23 September 1909 – 7 November 1993) was an Australian businessman and politician who was a Liberal Party member of the Legislative Assembly of Western Australia from 1959 to 1971.

Burt was born in Perth to Gladys (née MacMurtrie) and Frederick Julius Augustus Burt. His grandfather was Septimus Burt, who was also a member of parliament and served as Attorney-General of Western Australia. Burt attended Guildford Grammar School, and after leaving school went to the North-West, working variously as a crayfisherman, stationhand, pearler, and tin miner. He opened a machinery and hardware store in Cue in 1935, and in 1939 was elected to the Cue Road Board, of which he eventually became chairman. Burt entered parliament at the 1959 state election, narrowly winning the seat of Murchison from Everard O'Brien of the Labor Party. He transferred to the new seat of Murchison-Eyre at the 1968 election, and retired from parliament at the 1971 election. After leaving politics, Burt held directorships with various mining companies. He died in Perth in November 1993, aged 84, and had married Mary Groom in 1937, with whom he had three sons.

Parliament of Western Australia
Preceded by Everard O'Brien	Member for Murchison; 1959–1968	Abolished
New seat	Member for Murchison-Eyre; 1968–1971	Succeeded by Peter Coyne
