= Electoral district of Avon =

Former state electoral district of Western Australia

Avon Western Australia—Legislative Assembly
- State: Western Australia
- Dates current: 1911–2008^{1}
- Namesake: Avon River

Footnotes
- ^{1} known as Avon Valley 1950–1962

Avon was an electoral district of the Legislative Assembly in the Australian state of Western Australia from 1911 to 2008. The name of the district was changed to Avon Valley in 1950, but reverted to its original name in 1962.

For most of its history, Avon was a Country Party (now Nationals) seat. However, at the 1974 state election, when it merged with the neighbouring safe Labor seat of Northam, Avon was held by Labor's Ken McIver until 1986, when it was won by the newly reunified Nationals. A boundary redistribution occasioned by electoral reforms in 1987 brought in more rural areas and ensured its continuing safety for the National Party.

Avon was abolished when the number of rural seats was reduced as a result of the one vote one value reforms. Almost all of its area moved into the new seat of Central Wheatbelt.

== Geography ==
At the time of its abolition Avon was a rural electorate covering the eastern side of the Darling Scarp. Its main population centres included Northam, York, Beverley, Brookton, Pingelly, Boddington, Wandering, Popanyinning, Cuballing and Wickepin.

== Members ==
Avon (1911–1950)
Member	Party	Term
Thomas Bath	Labor	1911–1914
Tom Harrison	Country	1914–1923
Tom Harrison	Country (MCP)	1923–1924
Harry Griffiths	Country (ECP)	1924
Harry Griffiths	Country	1924–1935
Ignatius Boyle	Country	1935–1943
William Telfer	Labor	1943–1947
George Cornell	Country	1947–1950
Avon Valley (1950–1962)
Member	Party	Term
James Mann	Liberal Country League	1950–1962
Avon (1962–2008)
Member	Party	Term
Harry Gayfer	Country	1962–1974
Ken McIver	Labor	1974–1986
Max Trenorden	National	1986–2008
