= Electoral results for the district of Harvey =

Western Australian district election results

This is a list of electoral results for the Electoral district of Harvey in Western Australian state elections.

== Members for Harvey ==
Member	Party	Term
Iven Manning	Liberal Country League	1950–1962

== Election results ==
=== Elections in the 1950s ===
1959 Western Australian state election: Harvey
Party	Candidate	Votes	%	±%
Liberal and Country	Iven Manning	unopposed		
Liberal and Country hold		Swing		

1956 Western Australian state election: Harvey
Party	Candidate	Votes	%	±%
Liberal and Country	Iven Manning	unopposed		
Liberal and Country hold		Swing		

1953 Western Australian state election: Harvey
Party	Candidate	Votes	%	±%
Liberal and Country	Iven Manning	2,737	64.6	+15.7
Labor	Robert McCallum	1,500	35.4	+5.1
Total formal votes		4,237	98.1	−0.6
Informal votes		84	1.9	+0.6
Turnout		4,321	94.6	+2.0
Liberal and Country hold		Swing	−2.3	

1950 Western Australian state election: Harvey
Party	Candidate	Votes	%	±%
Liberal and Country	Iven Manning	2,048	48.9	
Labor	Robert McCallum	1,269	30.3	
Country	Walter Eckersley	868	20.7	
Total formal votes		4,185	98.7	
Informal votes		56	1.3	
Turnout		4,241	92.6	
Two-party-preferred result
Liberal and Country	Iven Manning	2,802	66.9	
Labor	Robert McCallum	1,383	33.1	
Liberal and Country hold		Swing		
