= Members of the Western Australian Legislative Council =

Following are lists of members of the Western Australian Legislative Council:

Prior to responsible government:

- 1832–1870
- 1870–1872
- 1872–1874
- 1874–1880
- 1880–1884
- 1884–1889
- 1889–1890
- 1890–1894

After responsible government:

- 1894–1896
- 1896–1898
- 1898–1900
- 1900–1902
- 1902–1904
- 1904–1906
- 1906–1908
- 1908–1910
- 1910–1912
- 1912–1914
- 1914–1916
- 1916–1918
- 1918–1920
- 1920–1922
- 1922–1924
- 1924–1926
- 1926–1928
- 1928–1930
- 1930–1932
- 1932–1934
- 1934–1936
- 1936–1938
- 1938–1940
- 1940–1944
- 1944–1946
- 1946–1948
- 1948–1950
- 1950–1952
- 1952–1954
- 1954–1956
- 1956–1958
- 1958–1960
- 1960–1962
- 1962–1965
- 1965–1968
- 1968–1971
- 1971–1974
- 1974–1977
- 1977–1980
- 1980–1983
- 1983–1986
- 1986–1989

Under the proportional representation constituency system:

- 1989–1993
- 1993–1997
- 1997–2001
- 2001–2005
- 2005–2009
- 2009–2013
- 2013–2017
- 2017–2021
- 2021–2025

Under the proportional representation state-wide constituency system:

- 2025–2029
