= Members of the Western Australian Legislative Council, 1930–1932 =

This is a list of members of the Western Australian Legislative Council from 22 May 1930 to 21 May 1932. The chamber had 30 seats made up of ten provinces each electing three members, on a system of rotation whereby one-third of the members would retire at each biennial election.

Name	Party	Province	Term expires	Years in office
Frederick Allsop	Nationalist	North-East	1936	1930–1932
Charles Baxter	Country	East	1932	1914–1950
Leonard Bolton^{[2]}	Nationalist	Metropolitan	1936	1932–1948
James Cornell	Nationalist	South	1936	1912–1946
John Drew	Labor	Central	1936	1900–1918; 1924–1947
John Ewing	Nationalist	South-West	1936	1916–1933
James Franklin	Nationalist	Metropolitan	1934	1928–1940
Gilbert Fraser	Labor	West	1934	1928–1958
William Glasheen	Country	South-East	1932	1925–1932
Edmund Gray	Labor	West	1932	1923–1952
Edmund Hall	Country	Central	1934	1928–1947
Vernon Hamersley	Country	East	1934	1904–1946
Edgar Harris	Nationalist	North-East	1932	1920–1934
Joseph Holmes	Independent	North	1932	1914–1942
George Kempton	Country	Central	1932	1926–1932
Sir John Kirwan	Independent	South	1932	1908–1946
William Kitson	Labor	West	1936	1924–1947
Sir William Lathlain	Nationalist	Metropolitan-Suburban	1932	1926–1932
Arthur Lovekin^{[2]}	Nationalist	Metropolitan	1936	1919–1931
James Macfarlane	Nationalist	Metropolitan-Suburban	1936	1922–1928; 1930–1942
William Mann	Nationalist	South-West	1932	1926–1951
George Miles	Nationalist	North	1936	1916–1950
Sir Charles Nathan	Nationalist	Metropolitan-Suburban	1934	1930–1934
John Nicholson	Nationalist	Metropolitan	1932	1918–1941
Edwin Rose	Nationalist	South-West	1934	1916–1934
Harold Seddon	Nationalist	North-East	1934	1922–1954
Hector Stewart^{[1]}	Country	South-East	1936	1917–1931
Alec Thomson^{[1]}	Country	South-East	1936	1931–1950
Charles Williams	Labor	South	1934	1928–1948
Charles Wittenoom	Country	South-East	1934	1928–1940
Sir Edward Wittenoom	Nationalist	North	1934	1883–1884; 1885–1886; 1894–1898; 1902–1906; 1910–1934
Herbert Yelland	Nationalist	East	1936	1924–1936

== Notes ==
^{1} On 9 August 1931, South-East Province Country MLC Hector Stewart died. Country candidate Alec Thomson won the resulting by-election on 26 September 1931.
^{2} On 10 December 1931, Metropolitan Province Nationalist MLC Arthur Lovekin died. Nationalist candidate Leonard Bolton won the resulting by-election on 6 February 1932.

== Sources ==
- Black, David (1991). Legislative Council of Western Australia : membership register, electoral law and statistics, 1890-1989. Perth: Parliamentary History Project. ISBN 0-7309-3641-4.
- Hughes, Colin A.; Aitkin, Don (1986). Voting for the Australian State Upper Houses, 1890-1984. Canberra: Australian National University. ISBN 0-909779-18-X.
- Black, David; Bolton, Geoffrey (2001a). Biographical Register of Members of the Parliament of Western Australia. Vol. One: 1870–1930 (Revised ed.). Parliament House: Parliament of Western Australia. ISBN 0730738140.
