= Members of the Western Australian Legislative Council, 1940–1944 =

This is a list of members of the Western Australian Legislative Council from 22 May 1940 to 21 May 1944. The chamber had 30 seats made up of ten provinces each electing three members, on a system of rotation whereby one-third of the members would retire at each biennial election.

On 16 January 1942, the Governor assented to the Legislative Council (Postponement of Election) Act 1941 (No. 50 of 1941), which extended the terms of all Councillors whose terms expired on 21 May 1942. This was done, in the words of the Act's preamble, due to the "pressing national emergency arising out of the war with Japan in which the Commonwealth of Australia is presently engaged". Later amendments fixed the date as 21 May 1944, and extended all other Councillors' terms by two years.

Name	Party	Province	Term expires	Years in office
Charles Baxter	Country	East	1946	1914–1950
Leonard Bolton	Nationalist	Metropolitan	1944	1932–1948
Sir Hal Colebatch	Nationalist	Metropolitan	1948	1912–1923; 1940–1948
James Cornell	Nationalist	South	1944	1912–1946
Cyril Cornish^{[2]}	Independent	North	1946	1942–1946
Les Craig	Nationalist	South-West	1944	1934–1956
James Dimmitt	Nationalist	Metropolitan-Suburban	1946	1938–1953
John Drew	Labor	Central	1944	1900–1918; 1924–1947
Gilbert Fraser	Labor	West	1948	1928–1958
Frank Gibson^{[3]}	Nationalist	Metropolitan-Suburban	1944	1942–1956
Edmund Gray	Labor	West	1946	1923–1952
Edmund Hall	Country	Central	1948	1928–1947
William Hall	Labor	North-East	1946	1938–1963
Vernon Hamersley	Country	East	1948	1904–1946
Eric Heenan	Labor	North-East	1944	1936–1968
James Hislop^{[1]}	Nationalist	Metropolitan	1946	1941–1971
Joseph Holmes^{[2]}	Independent	North	1946	1914–1942
Sir John Kirwan	Independent	South	1946	1908–1946
William Kitson	Labor	West	1944	1924–1947
James Macfarlane^{[3]}	Nationalist	Metropolitan-Suburban	1944	1922–1928; 1930–1942
William Mann	Nationalist	South-West	1946	1926–1951
George Miles	Ind. Nat.	North	1944	1916–1950
Thomas Moore	Labor	Central	1946	1920–1926; 1932–1946
John Nicholson^{[1]}	Nationalist	Metropolitan	1946	1918–1941
Hubert Parker	Nationalist	Metropolitan-Suburban	1948	1934–1954
Harold Piesse	Country	South-East	1946	1932–1946
Hugh Roche	Country	South-East	1948	1940–1960
Harold Seddon	Nationalist	North-East	1948	1922–1954
Alec Thomson	Country	South-East	1944	1931–1950
Hobart Tuckey	Nationalist	South-West	1948	1934–1951
Frank Welsh	Nationalist	North	1948	1940–1954
Charles Williams	Labor	South	1948	1928–1948
Garnet Barrington Wood	Country	East	1944	1936–1952

== Notes ==
^{1} On 16 September 1941, Metropolitan Province Nationalist MLC John Nicholson died. James Hislop, one of the Nationalist candidates, won the resulting by-election on 1 November 1941.
^{2} On 25 April 1942, North Province Independent MLC Joseph Holmes died. Independent candidate Cyril Cornish won the resulting by-election on 13 June 1942.
^{3} On 16 May 1942, Metropolitan-Suburban Province Nationalist MLC James Macfarlane died. Unendorsed Nationalist candidate Frank Gibson won the resulting by-election on 11 July 1942.

== Sources ==
- Black, David (1991). Legislative Council of Western Australia : membership register, electoral law and statistics, 1890-1989. Perth: Parliamentary History Project. ISBN 0-7309-3641-4.
- Hughes, Colin A.; Aitkin, Don (1986). Voting for the Australian State Upper Houses, 1890-1984. Canberra: Australian National University. ISBN 0-909779-18-X.
- Black, David; Bolton, Geoffrey (2001b). Biographical Register of Members of the Parliament of Western Australia. Vol. Two: 1930-1990 (Revised ed.). Parliament House: Parliament of Western Australia. ISBN 0731697839.
