= Members of the Western Australian Legislative Council, 1936–1938 =

This is a list of members of the Western Australian Legislative Council from 22 May 1936 to 21 May 1938. The chamber had 30 seats made up of ten provinces each electing three members, on a system of rotation whereby one-third of the members would retire at each biennial election.

Terms expiring in 1942 and thereafter were extended due to World War II by the Legislative Council (Postponement of Election) Act 1941 (No. 50 of 1941), which was given assent on 16 January 1942.

| Name | Party | Province | Term expires | Years in office |
|---|---|---|---|---|
| Edward Angelo | Nationalist | North | 1940 | 1934–1940 |
| Charles Baxter | Country | East | 1938 | 1914–1950 |
| Leonard Bolton | Nationalist | Metropolitan | 1942* | 1932–1948 |
| Alec Clydesdale | Labor | Metropolitan-Suburban | 1938 | 1932–1938 |
| James Cornell | Nationalist | South | 1942* | 1912–1946 |
| Les Craig | Nationalist | South-West | 1942* | 1934–1956 |
| John Drew | Labor | Central | 1942* | 1900–1918; 1924–1947 |
| Charles Elliott^{[2]} | Nationalist | North-East | 1938 | 1934–1938 |
| James Franklin | Nationalist | Metropolitan | 1940 | 1928–1940 |
| Gilbert Fraser | Labor | West | 1940 | 1928–1958 |
| Edmund Gray | Labor | West | 1938 | 1923–1952 |
| Edmund Hall | Country | Central | 1940 | 1928–1947 |
| Vernon Hamersley | Country | East | 1940 | 1904–1946 |
| Eric Heenan | Labor | North-East | 1942* | 1936–1968 |
| Joseph Holmes | Independent | North | 1938 | 1914–1942 |
| Sir John Kirwan | Independent | South | 1938 | 1908–1946 |
| William Kitson^{[1]} | Labor | West | 1942* | 1924–1947 |
| James Macfarlane | Nationalist | Metropolitan-Suburban | 1942* | 1922–1928; 1930–1942 |
| William Mann | Nationalist | South-West | 1938 | 1926–1951 |
| George Miles | Ind. Nat. | North | 1942* | 1916–1950 |
| Thomas Moore | Labor | Central | 1938 | 1920–1926; 1932–1946 |
| John Nicholson | Nationalist | Metropolitan | 1938 | 1918–1941 |
| Hubert Parker | Nationalist | Metropolitan-Suburban | 1940 | 1934–1954 |
| Harold Piesse | Ind. Country | South-East | 1938 | 1932–1946 |
| Harold Seddon | Nationalist | North-East | 1940 | 1922–1954 |
| Alec Thomson | Country | South-East | 1942* | 1931–1950 |
| Hobart Tuckey | Nationalist | South-West | 1940 | 1934–1951 |
| Charles Williams | Labor | South | 1940 | 1928–1948 |
| Charles Wittenoom | Country | South-East | 1940 | 1928–1940 |
| Garnet Barrington Wood | Country | East | 1942* | 1936–1952 |

== Notes ==
^{1} On 27 August 1936, West Province Labor MLC William Kitson was appointed Chief Secretary in the new Ministry led by John Willcock. He was therefore required to resign and contest a ministerial by-election, at which he was returned unopposed on 4 September 1936.
^{2} On 23 March 1938, North-East Province Nationalist MLC Charles Elliott died. No by-election was held due to the proximity of the 7 May 1938 Council elections.

== Sources ==
- Black, David (1991). Legislative Council of Western Australia : membership register, electoral law and statistics, 1890-1989. Perth: Parliamentary History Project. ISBN 0-7309-3641-4.
- Hughes, Colin A.; Aitkin, Don (1986). Voting for the Australian State Upper Houses, 1890-1984. Canberra: Australian National University. ISBN 0-909779-18-X.
- Black, David; Bolton, Geoffrey (2001b). Biographical Register of Members of the Parliament of Western Australia. Vol. Two: 1930-1990 (Revised ed.). Parliament House: Parliament of Western Australia. ISBN 0731697839.
