= Members of the Western Australian Legislative Council, 1938–1940 =

This is a list of members of the Western Australian Legislative Council from 22 May 1938 to 21 May 1940. The chamber had 30 seats made up of ten provinces each electing three members, on a system of rotation whereby one-third of the members would retire at each biennial election.

Terms expiring in 1942 and thereafter were extended due to World War II by the Legislative Council (Postponement of Election) Act 1941 (No. 50 of 1941), which was given assent on 16 January 1942.

Name	Party	Province	Term expires	Years in office
Edward Angelo	Nationalist	North	1940	1934–1940
Charles Baxter	Country	East	1944*	1914–1950
Leonard Bolton	Nationalist	Metropolitan	1942*	1932–1948
James Cornell	Nationalist	South	1942*	1912–1946
Les Craig	Nationalist	South-West	1942*	1934–1956
James Dimmitt	Nationalist	Metropolitan-Suburban	1944*	1938–1953
John Drew	Labor	Central	1942*	1900–1918; 1924–1947
James Franklin	Nationalist	Metropolitan	1940	1928–1940
Gilbert Fraser	Labor	West	1940	1928–1958
Edmund Gray	Labor	West	1944*	1923–1952
Edmund Hall	Country	Central	1940	1928–1947
William Hall	Labor	North-East	1944*	1938–1963
Vernon Hamersley	Country	East	1940	1904–1946
Eric Heenan	Labor	North-East	1942*	1936–1968
Joseph Holmes	Independent	North	1944*	1914–1942
Sir John Kirwan	Independent	South	1944*	1908–1946
William Kitson^{[1]}	Labor	West	1942*	1924–1947
James Macfarlane	Nationalist	Metropolitan-Suburban	1942*	1922–1928; 1930–1942
William Mann	Nationalist	South-West	1944*	1926–1951
George Miles	Ind. Nat.	North	1942*	1916–1950
Thomas Moore	Labor	Central	1944*	1920–1926; 1932–1946
John Nicholson	Nationalist	Metropolitan	1944*	1918–1941
Hubert Parker	Nationalist	Metropolitan-Suburban	1940	1934–1954
Harold Piesse	Country	South-East	1944*	1932–1946
Harold Seddon	Nationalist	North-East	1940	1922–1954
Alec Thomson	Country	South-East	1942*	1931–1950
Hobart Tuckey	Nationalist	South-West	1940	1934–1951
Charles Williams	Labor	South	1940	1928–1948
Charles Wittenoom	Country	South-East	1940	1928–1940
Garnet Barrington Wood	Country	East	1942*	1936–1952

== Sources ==
- Black, David (1991). Legislative Council of Western Australia : membership register, electoral law and statistics, 1890-1989. Perth: Parliamentary History Project. ISBN 0-7309-3641-4.
- Hughes, Colin A.; Aitkin, Don (1986). Voting for the Australian State Upper Houses, 1890-1984. Canberra: Australian National University. ISBN 0-909779-18-X.
- Black, David; Bolton, Geoffrey (2001b). Biographical Register of Members of the Parliament of Western Australia. Vol. Two: 1930-1990 (Revised ed.). Parliament House: Parliament of Western Australia. ISBN 0731697839.
