= Members of the Western Australian Legislative Council, 1916–1918 =

This is a list of members of the Western Australian Legislative Council from 22 May 1916 to 21 May 1918. The chamber had 30 seats made up of ten provinces each electing three members, on a system of rotation whereby one-third of the members would retire at each biennial election.

In March 1917, the Labor Party split over the matter of military conscription, with a number of Labor members of Parliament either resigning from the Party or being expelled. By May 1917, they had formed a new National Labor Party with a base in the Goldfields region, historically the heart of the Labor vote in Western Australia. In June 1917, they formed a coalition with the new Nationalist Party (which replaced the former Liberal Party) and the Country Party to form a governing coalition in the Legislative Assembly. With these arrangements, another Ministry was formed under new Premier Henry Lefroy.

Name	Party	Province	Term expires	Years in office
Joseph Allen	Lib. / Nat.	West	1920	1914–1920
Richard Ardagh	Labor / Nat. Lab.	North-East	1918	1912–1924
Charles Baxter	Country	East	1920	1914–1950
Harry Boan^{[6]}	Lib. / Nat.	Metropolitan	1920	1917–1918; 1922–1924
Henry Briggs	Lib. / Nat.	West	1922	1896–1919
Henry Carson	Country	Central	1920	1914–1920
Ephraim Clarke	Lib. / Nat.	South-West	1920	1901–1921
Hal Colebatch^{[3]}	Lib. / Nat.	East	1918	1912–1923
Francis Connor^{[5]}	Independent	North	1918	1906–1916
James Cornell	Labor / Nat. Lab.	South	1918	1912–1946
Joseph Cullen^{[7]}	Lib.	South-East	1918	1909–1917
James Cunningham^{[2]}	Labor	North-East	1922	1916–1922
Jabez Dodd	Labor / Nat. Lab.	South	1922	1910–1928
John Drew	Labor	Central	1918	1900–1918; 1924–1947
Joseph Duffell	Lib. / Nat.	Metropolitan-Suburban	1920	1914–1926
John Ewing^{[1]}	Lib. / Nat.	South-West	1918	1916–1933
James Greig	Country	South-East	1920	1916–1925
James Griffiths^{[2]}	Labor	North-East	1922	1916
Vernon Hamersley^{[4]}	Lib. / Nat.	East	1922	1904–1946
James Hickey	Labor	Central	1922	1916–1928
Joseph Holmes	Lib. / Ind.	North	1920	1914–1942
Arthur Jenkins^{[6]}	Lib.	Metropolitan	1920	1898–1904; 1908–1917
Walter Kingsmill	Lib. / Nat.	Metropolitan	1922	1903–1922
John Kirwan	Independent	South	1920	1908–1946
Robert Lynn	Lib. / Nat.	West	1918	1912–1924
Cuthbert McKenzie	Country	South-East	1922	1910–1922
George Miles^{[5]}	Independent	North	1918	1916–1950
Harry Millington	Labor	North-East	1920	1914–1920
John Nicholson^{[6]}	Nationalist	Metropolitan	1920	1918–1941
Edwin Rose	Lib. / Nat.	South-West	1922	1916–1934
Archibald Sanderson	Lib. / Nat.	Metropolitan-Suburban	1918	1912–1922
Athelstan Saw	Lib. / Nat.	Metropolitan-Suburban	1922	1915–1929
Charles Sommers	Lib. / Nat.	Metropolitan	1918	1900–1918
Hector Stewart^{[7]}	Lib. / Nat.	South-East	1918	1917–1931
Sir Edward Wittenoom	Lib. / Nat.	North	1922	1883–1884; 1885–1886; 1894–1898; 1902–1906; 1910–1934

== Notes ==
^{1} On 19 February 1916, South-West Province Liberal MLC John Winthrop Hackett died. Liberal candidate John Ewing won the resulting by-election, which was called to coincide with the 1916 Council elections.
^{2} At the 13 May 1916 election, Labor candidate James Griffiths was elected to the North-East Province seat, but died on 21 June 1916 before he could be sworn in. Labor candidate James Cunningham was returned unopposed on 7 July 1916.
^{3} On 27 July 1916, East Province Liberal MLC Hal Colebatch was appointed Colonial Secretary and Minister for Education in the new Ministry led by Frank Wilson. He was therefore required to resign and contest a ministerial by-election, at which he was returned unopposed on 9 August 1916.
^{4} At the 13 May 1916 elections, the East Province election had resulted in a tie between Vernon Hamersley, the sitting member, and the Country Party candidate Michael McCabe, and Hamersley was declared elected on the casting vote of the returning officer. On 1 August 1916, the Court of Disputed Returns declared the election null and void, and a by-election was held on 2 September 1916 which resulted in Hamersley's return with a 324-vote majority on a significantly higher turnout.
^{5} On 25 July 1916, North Province Independent MLC Francis Connor died. Independent candidate George Miles was elected unopposed on 18 September 1916.
^{6} On 27 March 1917, Metropolitan Province Liberal MLC Arthur Jenkins died. Liberal candidate Harry Boan was elected unopposed on 14 April 1917.
^{7} On 31 March 1917, South-East Province Liberal MLC Joseph Cullen died. Country Party candidate Hector Stewart won the resulting by-election on 19 May 1917.
^{8} On 21 February 1918, Metropolitan Province Nationalist MLC Harry Boan resigned after ten months in office. Nationalist candidate John Nicholson won the resulting by-election on 23 March 1918.

== Sources ==
- Black, David (1991). Legislative Council of Western Australia : membership register, electoral law and statistics, 1890-1989. Perth: Parliamentary History Project. ISBN 0-7309-3641-4.
- Hughes, Colin A.; Aitkin, Don (1986). Voting for the Australian State Upper Houses, 1890-1984. Canberra: Australian National University. ISBN 0-909779-18-X.
- Black, David; Bolton, Geoffrey (2001a). Biographical Register of Members of the Parliament of Western Australia. Vol. One: 1870–1930 (Revised ed.). Parliament House: Parliament of Western Australia. ISBN 0730738140.
