= Members of the Western Australian Legislative Council, 1934–1936 =

This is a list of members of the Western Australian Legislative Council from 22 May 1934 to 21 May 1936. The chamber had 30 seats made up of ten provinces each electing three members, on a system of rotation whereby one-third of the members would retire at each biennial election.

Name	Party	Province	Term expires	Years in office
Edward Angelo	Nationalist	North	1940	1934–1940
Charles Baxter	Country	East	1938	1914–1950
Leonard Bolton	Nationalist	Metropolitan	1936	1932–1948
Alec Clydesdale	Labor	Metropolitan-Suburban	1938	1932–1938
James Cornell	Nationalist	South	1936	1912–1946
Les Craig	Nationalist	South-West	1936	1934–1956
John Drew	Labor	Central	1936	1900–1918; 1924–1947
Charles Elliott	Nationalist	North-East	1938	1934–1938
James Franklin^{[1]}	Nationalist	Metropolitan	1940	1928–1940
Gilbert Fraser	Labor	West	1940	1928–1958
Edmund Gray	Labor	West	1938	1923–1952
Edmund Hall	Country	Central	1940	1928–1947
Vernon Hamersley	Country	East	1940	1904–1946
Joseph Holmes	Independent	North	1938	1914–1942
Sir John Kirwan	Independent	South	1938	1908–1946
William Kitson	Labor	West	1936	1924–1947
James Macfarlane	Nationalist	Metropolitan-Suburban	1936	1922–1928; 1930–1942
William Mann	Nationalist	South-West	1938	1926–1951
George Miles	Ind. Nat.	North	1936	1916–1950
Richard Moore	Nationalist	North-East	1936	1932–1936
Thomas Moore	Labor	Central	1938	1920–1926; 1932–1946
John Nicholson	Nationalist	Metropolitan	1938	1918–1941
Hubert Parker	Nationalist	Metropolitan-Suburban	1940	1934–1954
Harold Piesse	Ind. Country	South-East	1938	1932–1946
Harold Seddon	Nationalist	North-East	1940	1922–1954
Alec Thomson	Country	South-East	1936	1931–1950
Hobart Tuckey	Nationalist	South-West	1940	1934–1951
Charles Williams	Labor	South	1940	1928–1948
Charles Wittenoom	Country	South-East	1940	1928–1940
Herbert Yelland	Country	East	1936	1924–1936

== Notes ==
^{1} At the 12 May 1934 elections, James George, a fellow Nationalist candidate, won the Metropolitan Province seat from incumbent member James Franklin on Labor preferences (both candidates got 1,991 primary votes). Upon a petition to the Court of Disputed Returns, Franklin was declared elected on 21 November 1934 without a by-election.

== Sources ==
- Black, David (1991). Legislative Council of Western Australia : membership register, electoral law and statistics, 1890-1989. Perth: Parliamentary History Project. ISBN 0-7309-3641-4.
- Hughes, Colin A.; Aitkin, Don (1986). Voting for the Australian State Upper Houses, 1890-1984. Canberra: Australian National University. ISBN 0-909779-18-X.
- Black, David; Bolton, Geoffrey (2001b). Biographical Register of Members of the Parliament of Western Australia. Vol. Two: 1930-1990 (Revised ed.). Parliament House: Parliament of Western Australia. ISBN 0731697839.
