= Members of the Western Australian Legislative Council, 1944–1946 =

This is a list of members of the Western Australian Legislative Council from 22 May 1944 to 21 May 1946. The chamber had 30 seats made up of ten provinces each electing three members, on a system of rotation whereby one-third of the members would retire at each biennial election.

Name	Party	Province	Term expires	Years in office
Charles Baxter	Country	East	1946	1914–1950
Leonard Bolton	Nationalist	Metropolitan	1950	1932–1948
Sir Hal Colebatch	Nationalist	Metropolitan	1948	1912–1923; 1940–1948
James Cornell	Nationalist	South	1950	1912–1946
Cyril Cornish	Independent	North	1946	1942–1946
Les Craig	Nationalist	South-West	1950	1934–1956
James Dimmitt	Nationalist	Metropolitan-Suburban	1946	1938–1953
John Drew	Labor	Central	1950	1900–1918; 1924–1947
Gilbert Fraser	Labor	West	1948	1928–1958
Frank Gibson	Nationalist	Metropolitan-Suburban	1950	1942–1956
Edmund Gray	Labor	West	1946	1923–1952
Edmund Hall	Country	Central	1948	1928–1947
William Hall	Labor	North-East	1946	1938–1963
Vernon Hamersley	Country	East	1948	1904–1946
Eric Heenan	Labor	North-East	1950	1936–1968
James Hislop	Nationalist	Metropolitan	1946	1941–1971
Sir John Kirwan	Independent	South	1946	1908–1946
William Kitson	Labor	West	1950	1924–1947
Anthony Loton^{[1]}	Country	South-East	1946	1944–1965
William Mann	Nationalist	South-West	1946	1926–1951
George Miles	Independent	North	1950	1916–1950
Thomas Moore	Labor	Central	1946	1920–1926; 1932–1946
Hubert Parker	Nationalist	Metropolitan-Suburban	1948	1934–1954
Harold Piesse^{[1]}	Country	South-East	1946	1932–1946
Hugh Roche	Country	South-East	1948	1940–1960
Harold Seddon	Nationalist	North-East	1948	1922–1954
Alec Thomson	Country	South-East	1950	1931–1950
Hobart Tuckey	Nationalist	South-West	1948	1934–1951
Frank Welsh	Nationalist	North	1948	1940–1954
Charles Williams	Labor	South	1948	1928–1948
Garnet Barrington Wood	Country	East	1950	1936–1952

== Notes ==
^{1} On 16 September 1944, South-East Province Country MLC Harold Piesse died. Anthony Loton, one of the three Country Party candidates, won the resulting by-election on 18 November 1944.

== Sources ==
- Black, David (1991). Legislative Council of Western Australia : membership register, electoral law and statistics, 1890-1989. Perth: Parliamentary History Project. ISBN 0-7309-3641-4.
- Hughes, Colin A.; Aitkin, Don (1986). Voting for the Australian State Upper Houses, 1890-1984. Canberra: Australian National University. ISBN 0-909779-18-X.
- Black, David; Bolton, Geoffrey (2001b). Biographical Register of Members of the Parliament of Western Australia. Vol. Two: 1930-1990 (Revised ed.). Parliament House: Parliament of Western Australia. ISBN 0731697839.
