= Members of the Western Australian Legislative Council, 1910–1912 =

This is a list of members of the Western Australian Legislative Council from 22 May 1910 to 21 May 1912. The chamber had 30 seats made up of ten provinces each electing three members, on a system of rotation whereby one-third of the members would retire at each biennial election. Prior to the 1910 election, the Council had thought of itself as entirely independent from party politics, but with the election of Labor members to the Council and Labor's vigorous (and ultimately successful) campaign at the 1911 election for the Legislative Assembly, many of its members joined the newly formed Liberal Party which had emerged from the various National Political Leagues and Liberal Leagues.

Name	Party	Province	Term expires	Years in office
Henry Briggs	Liberal	West	1916	1896–1919
Thomas Brimage	Independent	North-East	1912	1900–1912
Ephraim Clarke	Liberal	South-West	1914	1901–1921
James Connolly	Liberal	North-East	1914	1901–1914
Francis Connor	Independent	North	1912	1906–1916
Joseph Cullen	Liberal	South-East	1912	1909–1917
Frederick Davis^{[3]}	Labor	Metropolitan-Suburban	1914	1911–1914
Jabez Dodd	Labor	South	1916	1910–1928
James Doland^{[3]}	Labor	Metropolitan-Suburban	1912	1911–1912
John Drew^{[4]}	Labor	Central	1912	1900–1918; 1924–1947
Douglas Gawler^{[1]}	Liberal	Metropolitan-Suburban	1916	1910–1915
John Glowrey	Independent	South	1912	1900–1904; 1906–1912
Sir John Winthrop Hackett	Liberal	South-West	1912	1890–1916
Vernon Hamersley	Independent	East	1916	1904–1946
Arthur Jenkins	Liberal	Metropolitan	1914	1898–1904; 1908–1917
Walter Kingsmill^{[1]}	Liberal	Metropolitan	1916	1903–1922
John Kirwan	Independent	South	1914	1908–1946
Joseph Langsford^{[3]}	Liberal	Metropolitan-Suburban	1912	1904–1911
Robert Laurie	Liberal	West	1912	1901–1912
Cuthbert McKenzie	Liberal	South-East	1916	1910–1922
Robert McKenzie	Liberal	North-East	1916	1904–1916
Edward McLarty	Liberal	South-West	1916	1894–1916
Warren Marwick^{[2]}	Liberal	East	1912	1910–1912
Matthew Moss	Liberal	West	1914	1900–1901; 1902–1914
Con O'Brien	Labor	Central	1914	1901–1904; 1908–1914
William Patrick	Liberal	Central	1916	1904–1916
Richard Pennefather	Independent	North	1914	1907–1914
Charles Piesse	Liberal	South-East	1914	1894–1914
Charles Sommers	Liberal	Metropolitan	1912	1900–1918
Sydney Stubbs^{[3]}	Liberal	Metropolitan-Suburban	1914	1908–1911
George Throssell^{[2]}		East	1912	1907–1910
Thomas Wilding	Liberal	East	1914	1908–1914
Edward Wittenoom	Liberal	North	1916	1883–1884; 1885–1886; 1894–1898; 1902–1906; 1910–1934

== Notes ==
^{1} On 1 March 1910, Metropolitan-Suburban Province MLC Walter Kingsmill resigned to contest a Senate seat in the federal election, and Douglas Gawler won the regular election for the seat on 23 March. Walter Kingsmill was subsequently elected at the regular Council election to a Metropolitan Province seat.
^{2} On 2 September 1910, East Province MLC George Throssell died. Warren Marwick won the resulting by-election on 26 September 1910.
^{3} On 22 September 1911, Metropolitan-Suburban Province MLC Sydney Stubbs resigned to contest the Assembly seat of Wagin, which he went on to represent until 1947, and Joseph Langsford resigned to contest the Assembly seat of Claremont. Labor candidates Frederick Davis and James Doland respectively won the resulting by-elections on 2 November 1911.
^{4} On 7 October 1911, Central Province MLC John Drew was appointed Colonial Secretary in the new Ministry led by John Scaddan. He was therefore required to resign and contest a ministerial by-election, at which he was returned unopposed on 17 October 1910.

== Sources ==
- Black, David (1991). Legislative Council of Western Australia : membership register, electoral law and statistics, 1890-1989. Perth: Parliamentary History Project. ISBN 0-7309-3641-4.
- Hughes, Colin A.; Aitkin, Don (1986). Voting for the Australian State Upper Houses, 1890-1984. Canberra: Australian National University. ISBN 0-909779-18-X.
- Black, David; Bolton, Geoffrey (2001a). Biographical Register of Members of the Parliament of Western Australia. Vol. One: 1870–1930 (Revised ed.). Parliament House: Parliament of Western Australia. ISBN 0730738140.
