= Members of the Western Australian Legislative Council, 1946–1948 =

This is a list of members of the Western Australian Legislative Council from 22 May 1946 to 21 May 1948. The chamber had 30 seats made up of ten provinces each electing three members, on a system of rotation whereby one-third of the members would retire at each biennial election.

| Name | Party | Province | Term expires | Years in office |
|---|---|---|---|---|
| Charles Baxter | Country | East | 1952 | 1914–1950 |
| George Bennetts | Labor | South | 1952 | 1946–1965 |
| Leonard Bolton^{[7]} | Liberal | Metropolitan | 1950 | 1932–1948 |
| Robert Boylen^{[2]} | Labor | South | 1950 | 1947–1955 |
| Sir Hal Colebatch | Liberal | Metropolitan | 1948 | 1912–1923; 1940–1948 |
| James Cornell^{[2]} | Liberal | South | 1950 | 1912–1946 |
| Les Craig | Liberal | South-West | 1950 | 1934–1956 |
| Harold Daffen^{[6]} | Liberal | Central | 1950 | 1947–1950 |
| Evan Davies^{[5]} | Labor | West | 1950 | 1947–1963 |
| James Dimmitt | Liberal | Metropolitan-Suburban | 1952 | 1938–1953 |
| John Drew^{[6]} | Labor | Central | 1950 | 1900–1918; 1924–1947 |
| Mervyn Forrest | Liberal | North | 1952 | 1946–1952 |
| Gilbert Fraser | Labor | West | 1948 | 1928–1958 |
| Frank Gibson | Liberal | Metropolitan-Suburban | 1950 | 1942–1956 |
| Edmund Gray | Labor | West | 1952 | 1923–1952 |
| Edmund Hall^{[3]} | Country | Central | 1948 | 1928–1947 |
| William Hall | Labor | North-East | 1952 | 1938–1963 |
| Vernon Hamersley^{[1]} | Country | East | 1948 | 1904–1946 |
| Eric Heenan | Labor | North-East | 1950 | 1936–1968 |
| James Hislop | Liberal | Metropolitan | 1952 | 1941–1971 |
| William Kitson^{[5]} | Labor | West | 1950 | 1924–1947 |
| Sir Charles Latham^{[1]} | Country | East | 1948 | 1946–1960 |
| Les Logan^{[3]} | Country | Central | 1948 | 1947–1974 |
| Anthony Loton | Country | South-East | 1952 | 1944–1965 |
| William Mann | Liberal | South-West | 1952 | 1926–1951 |
| George Miles | Independent | North | 1950 | 1916–1950 |
| Hubert Parker^{[4]} | Liberal | Metropolitan-Suburban | 1948 | 1934–1954 |
| Hugh Roche | Country | South-East | 1948 | 1940–1960 |
| Harold Seddon | Liberal | North-East | 1948 | 1922–1954 |
| Charles Simpson | Liberal | Central | 1952 | 1946–1963 |
| Alec Thomson | Country | South-East | 1950 | 1931–1950 |
| Hobart Tuckey | Liberal | South-West | 1948 | 1934–1951 |
| Keith Watson^{[7]} | Liberal | Metropolitan | 1950 | 1948–1968 |
| Frank Welsh | Liberal | North | 1948 | 1940–1954 |
| Charles Williams | Labor | South | 1948 | 1928–1948 |
| Garnet Barrington Wood | Country | East | 1950 | 1936–1952 |

== Notes ==
^{1} On 24 October 1946, East Province Country MLC member Vernon Hamersley died. Country candidate and former party leader Charles Latham won the resulting by-election on 14 December 1946. At 42 years, 2 months and 19 days, Vernon Hamersley served the longest term ever as member of the Council.
^{2} On 25 November 1946, South Province Liberal MLC James Cornell died. Labor candidate Robert Boylen won the resulting by-election on 1 February 1947.
^{3} On 15 February 1947, Central Province Country MLC Edmund Hall resigned. Country Party candidate Les Logan won the resulting by-election on 12 April 1947.
^{4} On 19 April 1947, Metropolitan-Suburban Province Liberal MLC Hubert Parker was appointed Minister for Mines and Minister for Health in the new Ministry led by Ross McLarty. He was therefore required to resign and contest a ministerial by-election, at which he was returned unopposed on 17 April 1947.
^{5} On 15 May 1947, West Province Labor MLC William Kitson resigned to accept an appointment as Agent-General for Western Australia in London. Labor candidate Evan Davies won the resulting by-election on 21 June 1947.
^{6} On 17 July 1947, Central Province Labor MLC John Drew died. Liberal candidate Harold Daffen won the resulting by-election on 30 August 1947.
^{7} On 31 March 1948, Metropolitan Province Liberal MLC Leonard Bolton died. Liberal candidate Keith Watson won the resulting by-election on 8 May 1948.

== Sources ==
- Black, David (1991). Legislative Council of Western Australia : membership register, electoral law and statistics, 1890-1989. Perth: Parliamentary History Project. ISBN 0-7309-3641-4.
- Hughes, Colin A.; Aitkin, Don (1986). Voting for the Australian State Upper Houses, 1890-1984. Canberra: Australian National University. ISBN 0-909779-18-X.
- Black, David; Bolton, Geoffrey (2001b). Biographical Register of Members of the Parliament of Western Australia. Vol. Two: 1930-1990 (Revised ed.). Parliament House: Parliament of Western Australia. ISBN 0731697839.
