= Members of the Western Australian Legislative Council, 1922–1924 =

This is a list of members of the Western Australian Legislative Council from 22 May 1922 to 21 May 1924. The chamber had 30 seats made up of ten provinces each electing three members, on a system of rotation whereby one-third of the members would retire at each biennial election. During the term, the Country Party split into rival Ministerial (MCP) and Executive (ECP) factions–although in the Council, this was diluted somewhat by the refusal of some long-standing Country members to become involved in the dispute. The Executive faction, loyal to the Primary Producers' Association, prevailed and by 1925 the Ministerial faction had merged with the Nationalist Party.

Name	Party	Province	Term expires	Years in office
Richard Ardagh	National Labor	North-East	1924	1912–1924
Frederick Baglin^{[4]}	Labor	West	1926	1920–1923
Charles Baxter	Country	East	1926	1914–1950
Harry Boan^{[1]}	Nationalist	Metropolitan-Suburban	1924	1917–1918; 1922–1924
Alfred Burvill	Country	South-East	1928	1922–1928
William Carroll^{[3]}	Country/ECP	East	1924	1923–1924
Hal Colebatch^{[3]}	Nationalist	East	1924	1912–1923
James Cornell	National Labor	South	1924	1912–1946
Jabez Dodd	National Labor	South	1928	1910–1928
Joseph Duffell	Nationalist	Metropolitan-Suburban	1926	1914–1926
John Ewing^{[2]}	Nationalist	South-West	1924	1916–1933
Edmund Gray	Labor	West	1926	1923–1952
James Greig	Country	South-East	1926	1916–1925
Vernon Hamersley	Country	East	1928	1904–1946
Edgar Harris	Nationalist	North-East	1926	1920–1934
James Hickey	Labor	Central	1928	1916–1928
Joseph Holmes	Independent	North	1926	1914–1942
John Kirwan	Independent	South	1926	1908–1946
Arthur Lovekin	Nationalist	Metropolitan	1924	1919–1931
Robert Lynn	Nationalist	West	1924	1912–1924
James Macfarlane	Nationalist	Metropolitan	1928	1922–1928; 1930–1942
George Miles	Independent	North	1924	1916–1950
Joshua Mills	Ind. Nat./MCP	Central	1924	1918–1924
Thomas Moore	Labor	Central	1926	1920–1926; 1932–1946
John Nicholson	Nationalist	Metropolitan	1926	1918–1941
George Potter	Nationalist	West	1928	1922–1928
Edwin Rose	Nationalist	South-West	1928	1916–1934
Archibald Sanderson^{[1]}	Nationalist	Metropolitan-Suburban	1924	1912–1922
Athelstan Saw	Nationalist	Metropolitan-Suburban	1928	1915–1929
Harold Seddon	Nationalist	North-East	1928	1922–1954
Hector Stewart	Country/ECP	South-East	1924	1917–1931
Francis Willmott	Country	South-West	1926	1921–1926
Sir Edward Wittenoom	Nationalist	North	1928	1883–1884; 1885–1886; 1894–1898; 1902–1906; 1910–1934

== Notes ==
^{1} On 19 October 1922, Metropolitan-Suburban Province Nationalist MLC Archibald Sanderson resigned. Nationalist candidate Harry Boan won the resulting by-election on 25 November 1922.
^{2} On 18 June 1923, South-West Province Nationalist MLC John Ewing was appointed Minister for Education, North West and Justice in the Ministry led by James Mitchell. He was therefore required to resign and contest a ministerial by-election, at which he was returned unopposed on 27 June 1923.
^{3} On 17 June 1923, East Province Nationalist MLC Hal Colebatch resigned. Country candidate William Carroll won the resulting by-election on 11 August 1923.
^{4} On 13 August 1923, West Province Labor MLC Frederick Baglin resigned. Labor candidate Edmund Gray won the resulting by-election on 8 September 1923.

== Sources ==
- Black, David (1991). Legislative Council of Western Australia : membership register, electoral law and statistics, 1890-1989. Perth: Parliamentary History Project. ISBN 0-7309-3641-4.
- Hughes, Colin A.; Aitkin, Don (1986). Voting for the Australian State Upper Houses, 1890-1984. Canberra: Australian National University. ISBN 0-909779-18-X.
- Black, David; Bolton, Geoffrey (2001a). Biographical Register of Members of the Parliament of Western Australia. Vol. One: 1870–1930 (Revised ed.). Parliament House: Parliament of Western Australia. ISBN 0730738140.
