= Members of the Western Australian Legislative Council, 1912–1914 =

This is a list of members of the Western Australian Legislative Council from 22 May 1912 to 21 May 1914. The chamber had 30 seats made up of ten provinces each electing three members, on a system of rotation whereby one-third of the members would retire at each biennial election.

Name	Party	Province	Term expires	Years in office
Richard Ardagh	Labor	North-East	1918	1912–1924
Henry Briggs	Liberal	West	1916	1896–1919
Ephraim Clarke	Liberal	South-West	1914	1901–1921
Hal Colebatch	Liberal	East	1918	1912–1923; 1940–1948
James Connolly^{[2]}	Liberal	North-East	1914	1901–1914
Francis Connor	Independent	North	1918	1906–1916
James Cornell	Labor	South	1918	1912–1946
Joseph Cullen	Liberal	South-East	1918	1909–1917
Frederick Davis	Labor	Metropolitan-Suburban	1914	1911–1914
Jabez Dodd	Labor	South	1916	1910–1928
John Drew	Labor	Central	1918	1900–1918; 1924–1947
Douglas Gawler	Liberal	Metropolitan-Suburban	1916	1910–1915
Sir John Winthrop Hackett	Liberal	South-West	1918	1890–1916
Vernon Hamersley	Independent	East	1916	1904–1946
Joseph Holmes^{[1]}	Liberal	North	1914	1914–1942
Arthur Jenkins	Liberal	Metropolitan	1914	1898–1904; 1908–1917
Walter Kingsmill	Liberal	Metropolitan	1916	1903–1922
John Kirwan	Independent	South	1914	1908–1946
Robert Lynn	Liberal	West	1918	1912–1924
Cuthbert McKenzie	Liberal	South-East	1916	1910–1922
Robert McKenzie	Liberal	North-East	1916	1904–1916
Edward McLarty	Liberal	South-West	1916	1894–1916
Harry Millington^{[2]}	Labor	North-East	1920	1914–1920
Matthew Moss	Liberal	West	1914	1900–1901; 1902–1914
Con O'Brien	Labor	Central	1914	1901–1904; 1908–1914
William Patrick	Liberal	Central	1916	1904–1916
Richard Pennefather^{[1]}	Independent	North	1914	1907–1914
Charles Piesse	Liberal	South-East	1914	1894–1914
Archibald Sanderson	Liberal	Metropolitan-Suburban	1918	1912–1922
Charles Sommers	Liberal	Metropolitan	1918	1900–1918
Thomas Wilding	Liberal	East	1914	1908–1914
Sir Edward Wittenoom	Liberal	North	1916	1883–1884; 1885–1886; 1894–1898; 1902–1906; 1910–1934

== Notes ==
^{1} On 22 January 1914, North Province MLC Richard Pennefather died. Joseph Holmes won the resulting by-election on 21 March 1914 against three other Liberal candidates.
^{2} On 21 February 1914, North-East Province MLC James Connolly resigned. Labor candidate Harry Millington won the resulting by-election on 21 March 1914, and his term was deemed to expire in May 1920.

== Sources ==
- Black, David (1991). Legislative Council of Western Australia : membership register, electoral law and statistics, 1890-1989. Perth: Parliamentary History Project. ISBN 0-7309-3641-4.
- Hughes, Colin A.; Aitkin, Don (1986). Voting for the Australian State Upper Houses, 1890-1984. Canberra: Australian National University. ISBN 0-909779-18-X.
- Black, David; Bolton, Geoffrey (2001a). Biographical Register of Members of the Parliament of Western Australia. Vol. One: 1870–1930 (Revised ed.). Parliament House: Parliament of Western Australia. ISBN 0730738140.
