= Members of the Western Australian Legislative Council, 1948–1950 =

This is a list of members of the Western Australian Legislative Council from 22 May 1948 to 21 May 1950. The chamber had 30 seats made up of ten provinces each electing three members, on a system of rotation whereby one-third of the members would retire at each biennial election.

Name	Party	Province	Term expires	Years in office
Charles Baxter	Country	East	1952	1914–1950
George Bennetts	Labor	South	1952	1946–1965
Robert Boylen	Labor	South	1950	1947–1955
Les Craig	Liberal	South-West	1950	1934–1956
John Cunningham	Liberal	South	1948	1948–1954; 1955–1962
Harold Daffen	Liberal	Central	1950	1947–1950
Evan Davies	Labor	West	1950	1947–1963
James Dimmitt	Liberal	Metropolitan-Suburban	1952	1938–1953
Mervyn Forrest	Liberal	North	1952	1946–1952
Gilbert Fraser	Labor	West	1954	1928–1958
Sir Frank Gibson	Liberal	Metropolitan	1950	1942–1956
Edmund Gray	Labor	West	1952	1923–1952
William Hall	Labor	North-East	1952	1938–1963
Harry Hearn	Liberal	Metropolitan	1954	1948–1956
Eric Heenan	Labor	North-East	1950	1936–1968
James Hislop	Liberal	Metropolitan	1952	1941–1971
Sir Charles Latham	Country	East	1954	1946–1960
Les Logan	Country	Central	1954	1947–1974
Anthony Loton	Country	South-East	1952	1944–1965
William Mann	Liberal	South-West	1952	1926–1951
George Miles	Independent	North	1950	1916–1950
Hubert Parker	Liberal	Metropolitan-Suburban	1954	1934–1954
Hugh Roche	Country	South-East	1954	1940–1960
Harold Seddon	Liberal	North-East	1954	1922–1954
Charles Simpson	Liberal	Central	1952	1946–1963
Alec Thomson	Country	South-East	1950	1931–1950
Hobart Tuckey	Liberal	South-West	1954	1934–1951
Keith Watson	Liberal	Metropolitan	1950	1948–1968
Frank Welsh	Liberal	North	1954	1940–1954
Garnet Barrington Wood	Country	East	1950	1936–1952

== Sources ==
- Black, David (1991). Legislative Council of Western Australia : membership register, electoral law and statistics, 1890-1989. Perth: Parliamentary History Project. ISBN 0-7309-3641-4.
- Hughes, Colin A.; Aitkin, Don (1986). Voting for the Australian State Upper Houses, 1890-1984. Canberra: Australian National University. ISBN 0-909779-18-X.
- Black, David; Bolton, Geoffrey (2001b). Biographical Register of Members of the Parliament of Western Australia. Vol. Two: 1930-1990 (Revised ed.). Parliament House: Parliament of Western Australia. ISBN 0731697839.
