= Members of the Western Australian Legislative Council, 1904–1906 =

This is a list of members of the Western Australian Legislative Council from 30 May 1904 to 21 May 1906. The chamber had thirty seats made up of ten provinces each electing three members, on a system of rotation whereby one-third of the members would retire at each biennial election.

| Name | Province | Term expires | Years in office |
|---|---|---|---|
| George Bellingham | South-East | 1908 | 1900–1908 |
| Henry Briggs | West | 1910 | 1896–1919 |
| Thomas Brimage | South | 1906 | 1900–1912 |
| Ephraim Clarke | South-West | 1908 | 1901–1921 |
| James Connolly | North-East | 1908 | 1901–1914 |
| Charles Dempster | East | 1906 | 1873–1874; 1894–1907 |
| John Drew^{[2]} | Central | 1906 | 1900–1918; 1924–1947 |
| John Winthrop Hackett | South-West | 1906 | 1890–1916 |
| Vernon Hamersley^{[1]} | East | 1910 | 1904–1946 |
| Samuel Johnson Haynes | South-East | 1910 | 1894–1910 |
| Edward Vivien Harvey Keane^{[1]} | East | 1910 | 1886–1890; 1904 |
| Walter Kingsmill^{[3]} | Metropolitan-Suburban | 1910 | 1903–1922 |
| Zebina Lane | Metropolitan-Suburban | 1908 | 1903–1908 |
| Joseph Langsford | Metropolitan-Suburban | 1906 | 1904–1911 |
| Robert Laurie | West | 1906 | 1901–1912 |
| William Loton | East | 1908 | 1889–1890; 1898–1900; 1902–1908 |
| Robert McKenzie | North-East | 1910 | 1904–1916 |
| Edward McLarty | South-West | 1910 | 1894–1916 |
| Wesley Maley | South-East | 1906 | 1900–1909 |
| Matthew Moss | West | 1908 | 1900–1901; 1902–1914 |
| William Oats | South | 1910 | 1904–1910 |
| William Patrick | Central | 1910 | 1904–1916 |
| Charles Piesse | South-East | 1908 | 1894–1914 |
| George Randell | Metropolitan | 1910 | 1875–1878; 1880–1890; 1893–1894; 1897–1910 |
| Sir George Shenton | Metropolitan | 1906 | 1870–1873; 1875–1906 |
| Robert Frederick Sholl | North | 1910 | 1886–1890; 1904–1909 |
| Charles Sommers | North-East | 1906 | 1900–1918 |
| Joseph Thomson | Central | 1908 | 1902–1908 |
| Frank Stone | North | 1906 | 1894–1906 |
| Sir Edward Wittenoom | North | 1908 | 1883–1884; 1885–1886; 1894–1898; 1902–1906; 1910–1934 |
| James Wright | Metropolitan | 1908 | 1902–1908 |

== Notes ==
^{1} On 9 July 1904, East Province MLC Edward Vivien Harvey Keane died. Vernon Hamersley won the resulting by-election on 5 August 1904.
^{2} On 10 August 1904, Central Province MLC John Drew was appointed Minister for Lands in the new Ministry led by Labor premier Henry Daglish. He was therefore required to resign and contest a ministerial by-election, at which he was returned unopposed on 27 August 1904.
^{3} On 25 August 1905, Metropolitan-Suburban Province MLC Walter Kingsmill was appointed Colonial Secretary and Minister for Education in the new Ministry led by Cornthwaite Rason. He was therefore required to resign and contest a ministerial by-election, at which he was returned unopposed on 6 September 1905.

== Sources ==
- Black, David (1991). Legislative Council of Western Australia : membership register, electoral law and statistics, 1890-1989. Perth: Parliamentary History Project. ISBN 0-7309-3641-4.
- Hughes, Colin A.; Aitkin, Don (1986). Voting for the Australian State Upper Houses, 1890-1984. Canberra: Australian National University. ISBN 0-909779-18-X.
