= Members of the Western Australian Legislative Council, 1906–1908 =

This is a list of members of the Western Australian Legislative Council from 22 May 1906 to 21 May 1908. The chamber had 30 seats made up of ten provinces each electing three members, on a system of rotation whereby one-third of the members would retire at each biennial election.

Name	Province	Term expires	Years in office
George Bellingham	South-East	1908	1900–1908
Henry Briggs	West	1910	1896–1919
Thomas Brimage	North-East	1912	1900–1912
Ephraim Clarke	South-West	1908	1901–1921
James Connolly^{[1]}	North-East	1908	1901–1914
Francis Connor	North	1912	1906–1916
Charles Dempster^{[3]}	East	1912	1873–1874; 1894–1907
John Drew	Central	1912	1900–1918; 1924–1947
John Glowrey	South	1912	1900–1904; 1906–1912
John Winthrop Hackett	South-West	1912	1890–1916
Vernon Hamersley	East	1910	1904–1946
Samuel Haynes	South-East	1910	1894–1910
Walter Kingsmill	Metropolitan-Suburban	1910	1903–1922
Zebina Lane	Metropolitan-Suburban	1908	1903–1908
Joseph Langsford	Metropolitan-Suburban	1912	1904–1911
Robert Laurie	West	1912	1901–1912
William Loton	East	1908	1889–1890; 1898–1900; 1902–1908
Robert McKenzie	North-East	1910	1904–1916
Edward McLarty	South-West	1910	1894–1916
Wesley Maley	South-East	1912	1900–1909
Matthew Moss	West	1908	1900–1901; 1902–1914
William Oats	South	1910	1904–1910
William Patrick	Central	1910	1904–1916
Richard Pennefather^{[2]}	North	1908	1907–1914
Charles Piesse	South-East	1908	1894–1914
George Randell	Metropolitan	1910	1875–1878; 1880–1890; 1893–1894; 1897–1910
Robert Frederick Sholl	North	1910	1886–1890; 1904–1909
Charles Sommers	Metropolitan	1912	1900–1918
Joseph Thomson	Central	1908	1902–1908
George Throssell^{[3]}	East	1912	1907–1910
Sir Edward Wittenoom^{[2]}	North	1908	1883–1884; 1885–1886; 1894–1898; 1902–1906; 1910–1934
James Wright	Metropolitan	1908	1902–1908

== Notes ==
^{1} On 7 May 1906, North-East Province MLC James Connolly was appointed Colonial Secretary and Minister for Commerce and Labour in the new Ministry led by Newton Moore. He was therefore required to resign and contest a ministerial by-election, at which he was returned unopposed on 16 May 1906.
^{2} On 6 November 1906, North Province MLC Edward Wittenoom resigned. Richard Pennefather won the resulting by-election on 15 January 1907.
^{3} On 21 July 1907, East Province MLC Charles Dempster resigned. George Throssell, who had served briefly as Premier in 1901, won the resulting by-election on 12 August 1907.

== Sources ==
- Black, David (1991). Legislative Council of Western Australia : membership register, electoral law and statistics, 1890-1989. Perth: Parliamentary History Project. ISBN 0-7309-3641-4.
- Hughes, Colin A.; Aitkin, Don (1986). Voting for the Australian State Upper Houses, 1890-1984. Canberra: Australian National University. ISBN 0-909779-18-X.
