= Members of the Western Australian Legislative Council, 1900–1902 =

This is a list of members of the Western Australian Legislative Council from 14 May 1900 to 12 May 1902. The chamber had 24 seats made up of eight provinces each electing three members, on a system of rotation whereby one-third of the members would retire at each biennial election. The Constitution Act Amendment Act 1899, which took effect after the 1900 election, created two new electorates—Metropolitan-Suburban Province and South Province—which had their inaugural elections on 29 August and 5 September 1900 respectively with terms expiring in 1906, 1904 and 1902.

Name	Province	Term expires	Years in office
George Bellingham	South	1902	1900–1908
Henry Briggs	West	1904	1896–1919
Thomas Brimage	South	1906	1900–1912
William Brookman	Metropolitan-Suburban	1906	1900–1903
R. G. Burges	East	1904	1894–1903
Ephraim Clarke^{[4]}	South-West	1902	1901–1921
James Connolly^{[3]}	North-East	1902	1901–1914
Frederick Crowder^{[5]}	East	1902	1894–1900; 1901–1902
Charles Dempster	East	1906	1873–1874; 1894–1907
John Drew	Central	1906	1900–1918; 1924–1947
John Glowrey	South	1904	1900–1904; 1906–1912
John Winthrop Hackett	South-West	1906	1890–1916
Richard Septimus Haynes	Central	1902	1896–1902
Samuel Johnson Haynes	South-East	1904	1894–1910
Adam Jameson^{[7]}	Metropolitan-Suburban	1904	1900–1903
Arthur Jenkins	North-East	1904	1898–1904; 1908–1917
Alfred Kidson	West	1902	1895–1902
Robert Laurie^{[6]}	West	1906	1901–1912
Henry Lukin^{[5]}	East	1902	1899–1901
Donald McDonald MacKay	North	1902	1896–1902
Edward McLarty	South-West	1904	1894–1916
Wesley Maley	South-East	1906	1900–1909
Alexander Matheson^{[3]}	North-East	1902	1897–1901
Matthew Moss^{[6]}	West	1906	1900–1901; 1902–1914
Con O'Brien^{[1]}	Central	1904	1901–1904; 1908–1914
Charles Piesse	South-East	1902	1894–1914
George Randell	Metropolitan	1904	1875–1878; 1880–1890; 1893–1894; 1897–1910
John Richardson	North	1904	1894–1904
Henry Saunders	Metropolitan	1902	1894–1902; 1918–1919
Sir George Shenton	Metropolitan	1906	1870–1873; 1875–1906
Charles Sommers^{[2]}	North-East	1906	1900–1918
James Speed	Metropolitan-Suburban	1902	1900–1902
William Spencer^{[4]}	South-West	1902	1896–1901
Frank Stone	North	1906	1894–1906
Frederic Whitcombe^{[1]}	Central	1904	1898–1900

== Notes ==
^{1} On 3 December 1900, Central Province MLC Frederic Whitcombe resigned. Labor Party member Con O'Brien won the resulting by-election on 30 January 1901. He is generally regarded as the first Labor member of the Legislative Council, although John Drew who served in the first Labor Cabinet in 1904–1905 and later joined the Labor Party was elected eight months earlier.
^{2} On 27 May 1901, North-East Province MLC Charles Sommers was appointed to the Ministry as Minister for Lands. He was therefore required to resign and contest a ministerial by-election, at which he was returned unopposed at the close of nominations on 6 June 1901.
^{3} In March 1901, North-East Province MLC Alexander Matheson resigned to contest a seat in the Australian Senate. James Connolly won the resulting by-election on 12 June 1901.
^{4} On 21 July 1901, South-West Province MLC William Spencer died. Ephraim Clarke won the resulting by-election on 21 August 1901.
^{5} On 23 September 1901, East Province MLC Henry Lukin died. Frederick Crowder, who had lost his South-East seat 16 months earlier, won the resulting by-election on 30 October 1901.
^{6} Following the failure of the Leake Ministry, a new Ministry led by Alf Morgans was sworn in, and on 21 November 1901, West Province MLC Matthew Moss was appointed Colonial Secretary. He was therefore required to resign and contest a ministerial by-election, at which he was defeated by Robert Laurie.
^{7} On 23 December 1901, following the failure of the Morgans Ministry, a new Ministry led by George Leake was sworn in, and Metropolitan-Suburban Province MLC Adam Jameson was appointed as Minister for Lands. He was therefore required to resign and contest a ministerial by-election, at which he was returned unopposed at the close of nominations on 2 January 1902.

== Sources ==
- Black, David (1991). Legislative Council of Western Australia : membership register, electoral law and statistics, 1890-1989. Perth: Parliamentary History Project. ISBN 0-7309-3641-4.
- Hughes, Colin A.; Aitkin, Don (1986). Voting for the Australian State Upper Houses, 1890-1984. Canberra: Australian National University. ISBN 0-909779-18-X.
