= South-West Province =

South-West or Southwest Province may refer to:

- Southwest Australia, a bioregion in Western Australia;
- South-West Province (Western Australia), an electoral province of Western Australia;
- Southwest Region (Cameroon), a region of Cameroon (known as Southwest Province between 1983 and 2008).
