= Northeastern Province =

Northeastern Province or Northeast Province may refer to:

- North Eastern Province, Kenya
- North Eastern Province, Sri Lanka, a former province of Sri Lanka
- Northeast Province (IMCRA region), an Australian marine biogeographic province
- North-East Province (Western Australia), a former electoral province of Western Australia
- Northeastern provinces, an informal grouping of three Chinese provinces
- North-East Frontier, province of British India now Assam
- North-East Frontier Agency, former political division of India now Arunachal Pradesh
- North Eastern Province (Victoria), a former electoral province of Victoria
