= James Doland =

Australian politician

James Alfred Doland (26 April 1880 – 19 October 1943) was a Member of the Western Australian Legislative Council for four months in 1911–12.

The son of farmer Thomas Doland and Elizabeth née McGuffin, Doland was born in Albury, New South Wales on 26 April 1880. In 1889 he emigrated to Western Australia, working as a tailor at Bunbury and Perth from 1900. That year he was president of the Tailors' Association of Western Australia, and he was later president of the Perth chapter of the Australian Natives' Association. On 24 July 1907 he married Grace Margaret Radley, with whom he had a son and two daughters.

From 1907, Doland became active in the Labor movement. He was secretary of the Political Labor Council from 1907 to 1909, and thereafter became president of the Metropolitan District Council of the Australian Labor Federation. On 3 November 1911, he was elected to the Legislative Council's Metropolitan-Suburban Province, in a by-election occasioned by the resignation of Joseph Langsford. He held the seat until the dissolution of parliament on 21 March 1912. He contested the seat in the subsequent election of 14 May, but was unsuccessful. In the election of 21 October 1914 he contested the Western Australian Legislative Assembly seat of West Perth, again without success.

Little is known of Doland's life after 1914. He died on 19 October 1943, from injuries caused by an accident in which he fell from a moving tram. He was buried at Karrakatta Cemetery.
