= Charles Latham =

Australian politician

The Honourable Sir Charles Latham
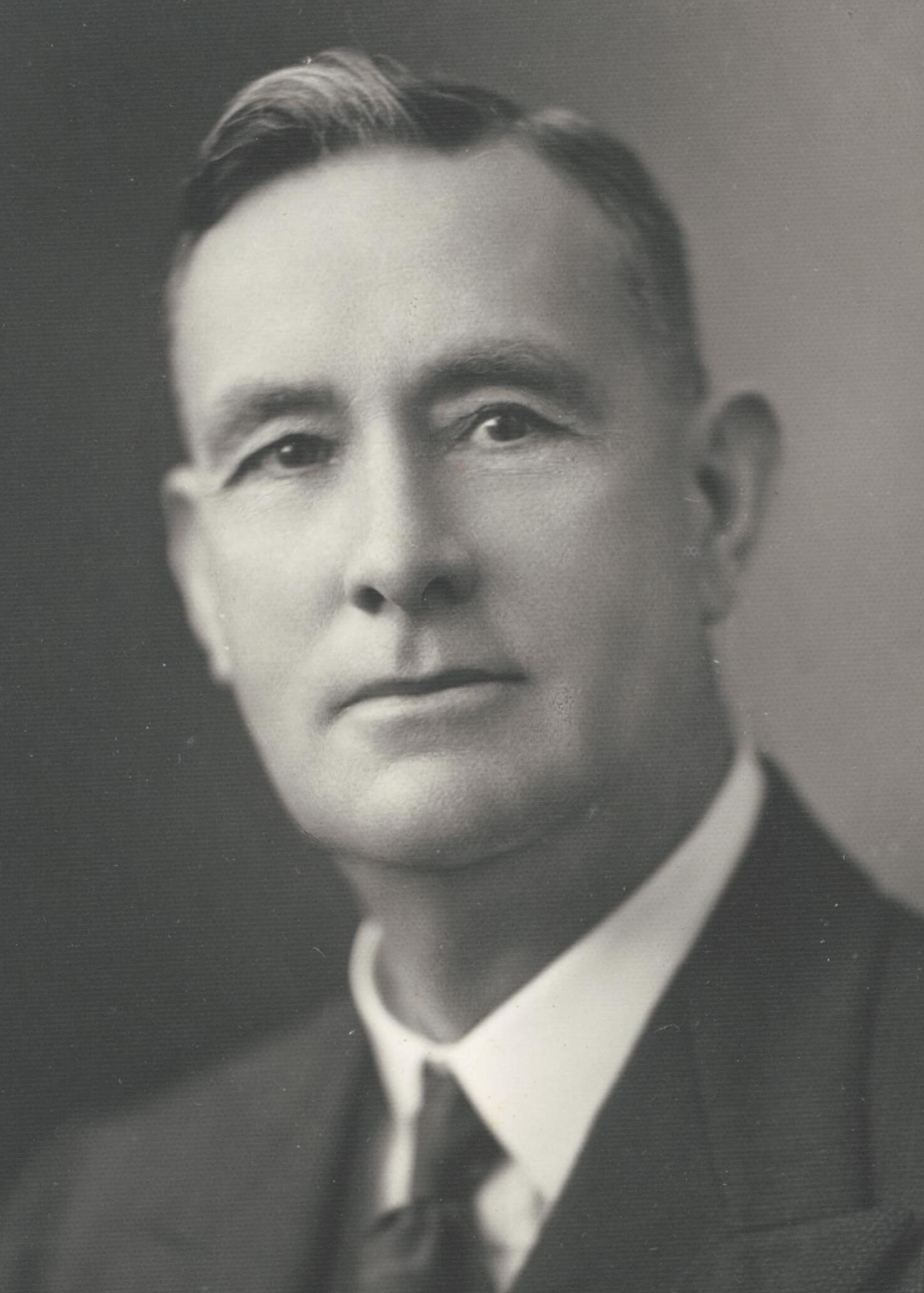
- Latham in the 1940s

10th President of the Western Australian Legislative Council
- In office 7 July 1958 – 21 May 1960
- Preceded by: Anthony Loton
- Succeeded by: Leslie Diver

Member of the Western Australian Legislative Council
- In office 22 May 1950 – 21 May 1960
- Preceded by: Les Logan
- Succeeded by: Norm Baxter
- Constituency: Central Province
- In office 14 December 1946 – 21 May 1950
- Preceded by: Vernon Hamersley
- Succeeded by: Electorate abolished
- Constituency: East Province

8th Leader of the Opposition in Western Australia
- In office 25 April 1933 – 7 October 1942
- Monarchs: George V Edward VIII; George VI
- Deputy: Norbert Keenan; Ross McDonald
- Lieutenant-Governor: John Northmore (1931–1933) (Note: Was Administrator of Western Australia from 1931 – 29 June 1932; Lieutenant-Governor until 10 July 1933.)
- Preceded by: Philip Collier
- Succeeded by: Arthur Watts

Leader of the Country Party in Western Australia
- In office 17 April 1930 – 7 October 1942
- Deputy: John Lindsay; Percy Ferguson
- Preceded by: Alec Thomson
- Succeeded by: Arthur Watts

Deputy Leader of the Country Party in Western Australia
- In office 21 November 1928 – 17 April 1930
- Leader: Alec Thomson
- Preceded by: Bertie Johnston
- Succeeded by: John Lindsay
Ministerial positions
Minister for Agriculture
In office 3 January 1952 – 23 February 1953
Premier	Ross McLarty
Preceded by	Garnet Wood
Succeeded by	Ernest Hoar
Minister for Lands
In office 24 April 1930 – 24 April 1933
Premier	James Mitchell
Preceded by	Frank Troy
Succeeded by	Frank Troy
Minister for Immigration
In office 24 April 1930 – 24 April 1933
Premier	James Mitchell
Preceded by	Frank Troy
Succeeded by	Frank Troy
Minister for Health
In office 24 April 1930 – 24 April 1933
Premier	James Mitchell
Preceded by	Selby Munsie
Succeeded by	Selby Munsie

Member of the Western Australian Legislative Assembly for York
- In office 12 March 1921 – 7 October 1942
- Preceded by: Harry Griffiths
- Succeeded by: Charles Perkins
Federal politics
Senator for Western Australia
Appointed
In office 8 October 1942 – 20 August 1943
Preceded by	Bertie Johnston
Succeeded by	Dorothy Tangney

Personal details
- Born: Charles George Latham; 26 January 1882 Hythe, Kent, England, UK
- Died: 27 August 1968 (aged 86) South Perth, Western Australia, Australia
- Resting place: Karrakatta Cemetery, Perth, Western Australia
- Citizenship: British; Australian
- Party: Country
- Spouse: Marie Louisa von Allwörden (m. 1903)
- Children: 2

Military service
- Allegiance: Australia
- Branch/service: Australian Army
- Years of service: 1916–1919
- Rank: Sergeant
- Unit: First Australian Imperial Force
- Commands: 16th Battalion
- Battles/wars: World War I; • Passchendaele; Polygon Wood: • St Quentin Canal

Sir Charles George Latham (26 January 1882 – 26 August 1968), often shortened to simply C. G. Latham, was an Australian politician, former leader of the opposition in Western Australia and the 10th President of the Western Australian Legislative Council. Latham served over twelve years as leader of the state's Country Party, and over thirty years in the Parliament of Western Australia. Latham also served roughly ten months in the Federal Parliament, as a Senator for Western Australia.

== Biography ==
Latham was born in Hythe, Kent in England, and became an orphan before the age of 8 when his parents Thomas Latham (a coast guard) and Isabella (née Isum) died. Latham moved to New South Wales in Australia with his siblings in 1890 and married Marie Louisa von Allwörden on 24 June 1903 at Hay in the same state.

In 1910, Latham moved to Western Australia to take up 1,000 acres (4.0 km^{2}) of land at East Kumminin (now Narembeen), 286 kilometers (178 mi) east of Perth. In his early farming days, he was unsuccessful, but was not deterred by the 1914 drought and owned 2,000 acres (8.1 km^{2}) of land in 1921 when he entered parliament.

In 1916 Latham enlisted in the entirely volunteer-run First Australian Imperial Force and was promoted to the rank of Corporal in January 1917. He was wounded in France in March 1918. Latham was promoted Sergeant in 1919 and was discharged in May of that year.

== Political career ==
Latham became the Country Party (now National Party) candidate for the Legislative Assembly seat of York in 1921 and became a MLA following this endorsement. Before the First World War Latham was a member of the Bruce Rock Road Board before the war, but upon his return to Australia he became the chairman of the Narembeen Road Board in 1924. In 1930 Latham became the parliamentary leader of the Country Party and fervently rallied for farmers' rights. Later that year he joined the Party with the Nationalist Party and served as deputy Premier of Western Australia under James Mitchell from 1930 to 1933. From 1933 onwards, Latham was the Leader of the Opposition until 1942, when he resigned to fill a vacancy in the Australian Senate but lost the 1943 election. Latham then returned to Parliament in 1946 to serve as a Member of the Legislative Council, became Minister for Agriculture in 1952–53 and retired in 1960, after another two years as the President of the Legislative Council.

Latham died on 26 August 1968 and was cremated at Karrakatta Cemetery.

== See also ==
- Leader of the Opposition (Western Australia)
- National Party of Western Australia

Western Australian Legislative Council
Preceded by Vernon Hamersley	Member for East Province; 1946-1950	Succeeded by Electorate abolished
Preceded by Les Logan	Member for Central Province; 1950-1960	Succeeded by Norm Baxter
Preceded by Anthony Loton	President of the Western Australian Legislative Council; 1958–1960	Succeeded by Leslie Diver
