= Hector Stewart =

Politician in Western Australia

Hector Joseph Stewart MLC (29 July 1875 – 9 August 1931) was the member of the Western Australian Legislative Council for the South-East Province, from 1917 to 1931. He was a member of what was then the Country Party (now the National Party).

He was born in Prahran in Victoria, to Andrew Stewart (publisher) and Josaphine Stuart Little.

He died on 9 August 1931 in Subiaco, Perth, whilst still in office. His death occurred after he was admitted to St John of God Subiaco Hospital for a "serious operation".
