= James Franklin (politician) =

Australian politician

James Franklin MLC

Member of the Western Australian Legislative Council for Suburban Province
- In office 22 May 1928 – 1940

James Thomas Franklin (25 October 1854 – 1 September 1940) was an Australian politician. He was a member of the Western Australian Legislative Council representing the Metropolitan and Suburban Provinces from his election on 22 May 1928 until the end of his term in 1940. Franklin was a member of the Liberal Party until 1917, then joined the National Party.
