= Alec Thomson =

Australian politician

- Constituency: Katanning, South-East Province

Personal details
- Born: 9 March 1873 South Shields, County Durham, England
- Died: 18 November 1953 (aged 80) Katanning, Western Australia
- Party: Country Party
- Spouse: Edith Jenkinson
- Profession: Builder and storekeeper

Alexander Thomson (9 March 1873 – 18 November 1953), known as Alec Thomson, was an Australian politician, and a member of the Western Australian Legislative Assembly from 1914 until 1930 representing the seat of Katanning, and a member of the Western Australian Legislative Council representing the South Province from 1931 until 1950.

== Biography ==
Thomson was born in South Shields, County Durham, England, to John Thomson, a carpenter, joiner and builder, and Jane (néé McWilliam). His mother died when he was very young, and the family moved to Melbourne, where he attended Essendon Primary School until the age of 14. He was apprenticed to his father in the carpentry trade before working in several Victorian towns.

In 1895, Thomson came to Western Australia, working as a journeyman at Fremantle before establishing a business there. On 4 April 1896, he married Edith Maud Jenkinson, with whom he was to have four sons. He worked at Buckland Hill and served as a councillor on the Buckland Hill Road Board from 1903 until 1905, before moving to the town of Katanning where he opened a timber and hardware store known as Thomson and Melany. In 1911, he was elected to the Katanning Road Board and served as its chairman in 1913.

At the 1914 state election, Thomson was elected under the Liberal Party banner to the seat of Katanning. He switched to the Country Party in 1917.

Thomson became the Country Party's deputy leader in 1921. In 1923, the party split between the majority of the party's parliamentary wing, who favoured a coalition with the Nationalist Party, and the party executive who favoured a more independent line. Thomson led the three-member Executive Country Party to the 1924 election, where most of the Majority faction lost their seats. Thomson became leader of a reunited Country Party and led it until being defeated in his own seat by Arnold Piesse, an unendorsed Country Party candidate, at the 1930 election.

He stood for and won a by-election for one of the South-East Province seats in the Western Australian Legislative Council on 26 September 1931 following the death of Hector Stewart, which he retained until his retirement at the 1950 Legislative Council election, at which his son, Jack Thomson, succeeded him. Jack went on to hold the seat for 24 years.

Over the intervening years, Alec Thomson had been director of the Katanning Flour Mill, founder of the Katanning Fresh Air League and the Historical Society, and was active in local affairs, including serving as president of the Katanning Bowling Club and the Katanning Club. He was also active in the Freemasons.

Thomson died at home on 18 November 1953, aged 80, and was cremated at Karrakatta Cemetery.

Parliament of Western Australia
Preceded by Arnold Piesse	Member for Katanning; 1914–1930	Succeeded by Arnold Piesse
Preceded by Henry Kennedy Maley	Leader of the WA Country Party; 1923–1930	Succeeded by Charles Latham
