= John Winthrop Hackett =

Australian politician (1848–1916)

Sir John Winthrop Hackett KCMG
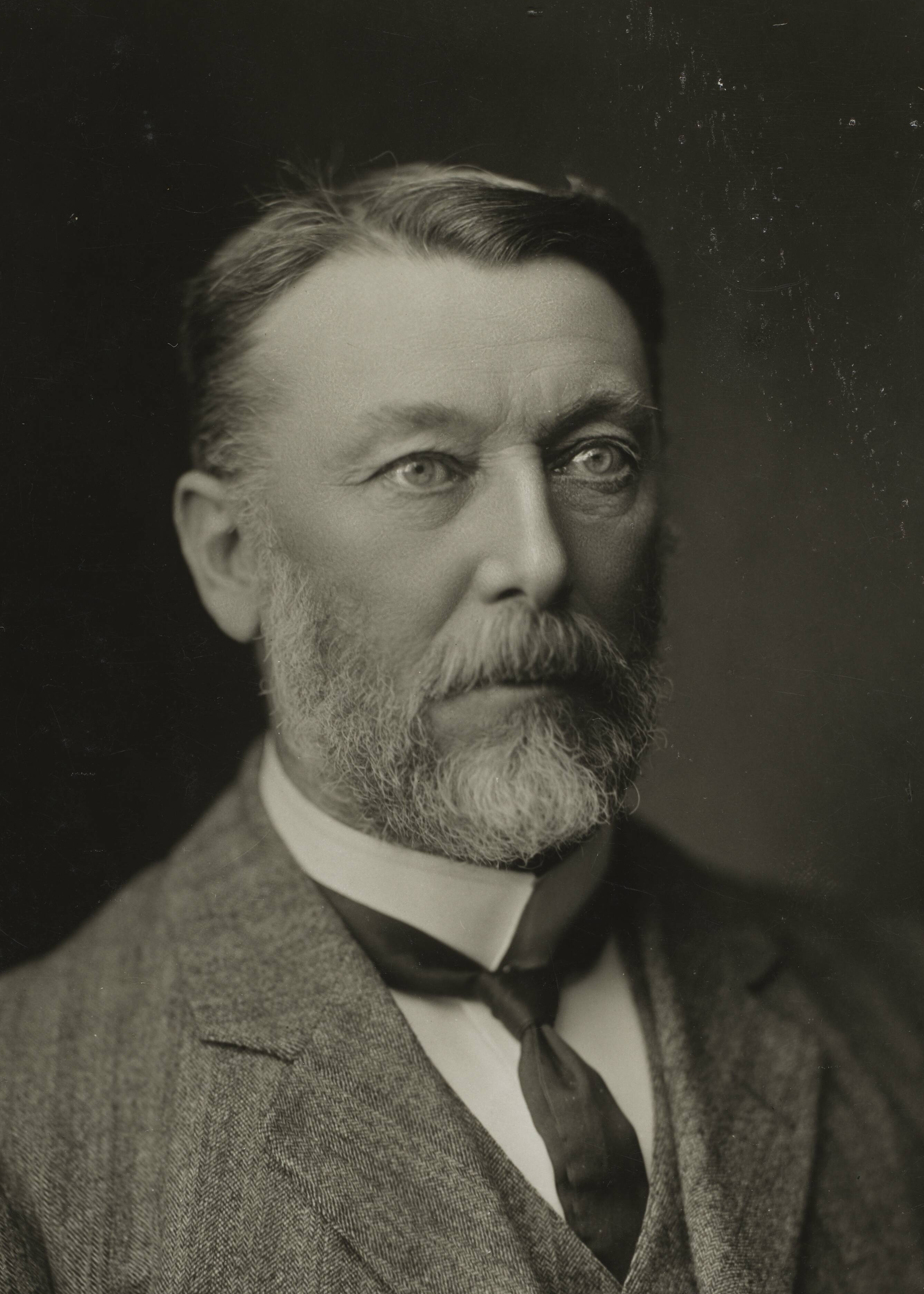
- Hackett c. 1912

Chancellor of the University of Western Australia
- In office 11 March 1912 – 19 February 1916
- Preceded by: New office
- Succeeded by: Charles Riley

Member of the Western Australian Legislative Council
- In office 29 December 1890 – 19 February 1916
- Preceded by: New office
- Succeeded by: John Ewing
- Constituency: South-West Province

Personal details
- Born: 4 February 1848 near Bray, County Wicklow, Ireland
- Died: 19 February 1916 (aged 67) Perth, Western Australia, Australia
- Spouse: Deborah Drake-Brockman (m. 1905)
- Children: 5, incl. John and Patricia
- Education: Trinity College, Dublin
- Profession: Barrister; Journalist; Newspaper editor

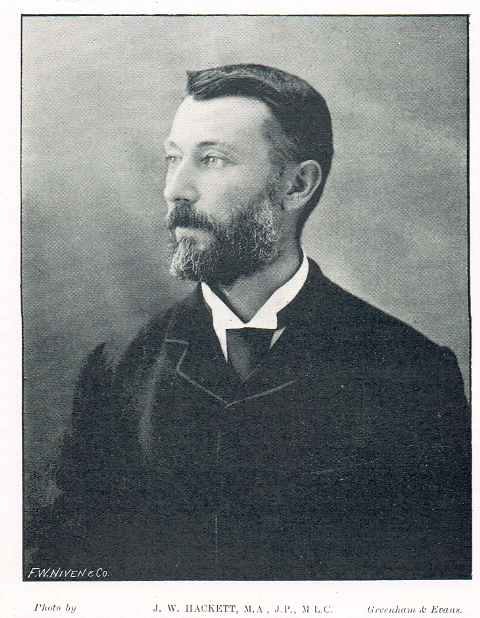
John Winthrop Hackett

Sir John Winthrop Hackett Sr. KCMG (4 February 1848 – 19 February 1916), generally known as "Winthrop Hackett", was a proprietor and editor of several newspapers in Western Australia, a politician and a university chancellor.

Hackett was born near Bray, County Wicklow, Ireland. He died suddenly on 19 February 1916 of a heart condition and was buried in Karrakatta Cemetery.

== Family ==
On 3 August 1905, Hackett married the 18-year-old Deborah Vernon Brockman (1887–1965). He confided in his political ally Walter James, "This is in the strictest sense a 'marriage de convenance' ". The couple had four daughters, and a son also called John. John (1910–1997) also became Sir John Hackett, a popular and distinguished General in the British Army. After she was widowed, Lady Hackett remarried to become Lady Moulden, and finally – after an honorary doctorate and a further widowhood – married Basil Buller Murphy to become Dr. Deborah Buller Murphy.

A daughter Patricia Hackett (1908–1963) followed her father into the legal profession, and is today remembered for the Patricia Hackett Prize awarded by the University of Western Australia and endowed in her memory in 1965.

== Legacy ==
Hackett was awarded the honorary degree of LL.D. by Trinity College, Dublin in June 1902. He left £425,000 (equivalent to $38,000,000 in 2022) to the University of Western Australia. This was an unexpectedly large sum, because by the time that the university was ready to receive it in 1926, shares in The West Australian had increased greatly in value. £250,000 of interest went to the construction of buildings such Winthrop Hall and Hackett Hall, which were built in a much grander architectural style than might previously have been envisaged. Another £200,000 was used to set up a fund for scholarships and bursaries.

The suburb of Hackett, in inner North Canberra, Australian Capital Territory, Australia bears his name, in recognition of his efforts to support the federation of the Australian colonies, which took place in 1901. Streets and a suburb in Perth are also named "Hackett" and "Winthrop".

The species epithet of the extinct giant echidna Murrayglossus hacketti honours Hackett.

== Arms ==
Coat of arms of John Winthrop Hackett

Notes
Confirmed by Sir Arthur Vicars, Ulster King of Arms, 30 July 1907.
Crest
On a wreath of the colours an eagle displayed with two heads per pale Azure and Gules between the heads a trefoil slipped Vert.
Escutcheon
Quarterly 1st & 4th Azure three hakes haurient fesswise Argent (Hackett 1508) 2nd & 3rd Gules three hakets Argent (Hackett 1639).
Motto
Mon Esperance Est En Dieu

Academic offices
New title	Chancellor of the University of Western Australia; 1912 – 1916	Succeeded by Most Rev. Charles Riley
