= Charles Williams (Australian politician) =

Australian politician

Charles Bennett Williams (9 February 1890 – 1 December 1952) was an Australian politician. He was a Labor member of the Western Australian Legislative Council (for South Province) from 1928 to 1948.
