= East Province (Western Australia) =

Former electoral province of Western Australia

East Province was an electoral province of the Legislative Council of Western Australia between 1894 and 1950. It elected three members throughout its existence.

== Members ==
Three members (1894–1950)
Member 1	Party	Term	Member 2	Party	Term	Member 3	Party	Term
Charles Dempster	None	1894–1907	R. G. Burges	None	1894–1903	Richard Hardey	None	1894–1896
Charles Dempster	None	1894–1907	R. G. Burges	None	1894–1903	Howard Taylor	None	1896–1899
Charles Dempster	None	1894–1907	R. G. Burges	None	1894–1903	Henry Lukin	None	1899–1901
Charles Dempster	None	1894–1907	R. G. Burges	None	1894–1903	Frederick Crowder	None	1901–1902
Charles Dempster	None	1894–1907	R. G. Burges	None	1894–1903	William Loton	None	1902–1908
Charles Dempster	None	1894–1907	Andrew Dempster	None	1903–1904	William Loton	None	1902–1908
Charles Dempster	None	1894–1907	Edward Vivien Harvey Keane	None	1904	William Loton	None	1902–1908
Charles Dempster	None	1894–1907	Vernon Hamersley	None	1904–1910	William Loton	None	1902–1908
George Throssell	None	1907–1910	Vernon Hamersley	None	1904–1910	William Loton	None	1902–1908
George Throssell	None	1907–1910	Vernon Hamersley	None	1904–1910	Thomas Wilding	None	1908–1910
Warren Marwick	Liberal	1910–1912	Vernon Hamersley	Liberal	1910–1917	Thomas Wilding	Liberal	1910–1914
Hal Colebatch	Liberal	1912–1917	Vernon Hamersley	Liberal	1910–1917	Thomas Wilding	Liberal	1910–1914
Hal Colebatch	Liberal	1912–1917	Vernon Hamersley	Liberal	1910–1917	Charles Baxter	Country	1914–1950
Hal Colebatch	Nationalist	1917–1923	Vernon Hamersley	Nationalist	1917–1920	Charles Baxter	Country	1914–1950
Hal Colebatch	Nationalist	1917–1923	Vernon Hamersley	Country	1920–1946	Charles Baxter	Country	1914–1950
William Carroll	Country	1923–1924	Vernon Hamersley	Country	1920–1946	Charles Baxter	Country	1914–1950
Herbert Yelland	Nationalist	1924–1936	Vernon Hamersley	Country	1920–1946	Charles Baxter	Country	1914–1950
Garnet Wood	Country	1936–1950	Vernon Hamersley	Country	1920–1946	Charles Baxter	Country	1914–1950
Garnet Wood	Country	1936–1950	Sir Charles Latham	Country	1946–1950	Charles Baxter	Country	1914–1950
Major reconstitution in 1950 – existing East Province effectively renamed Central Province and existing Central Province effectively renamed Midland Province.
