= Charles Baxter (politician) =

Australian politician

The Honourable Charles Baxter

Member of the Legislative Council of Western Australia
- In office 22 May 1914 – 2 March 1950
- Preceded by: Thomas Wilding
- Succeeded by: None (abolished)
- Constituency: East Province

Personal details
- Born: 20 May 1874 Croxton East, Victoria, Australia
- Died: 2 March 1950 (aged 75) Subiaco, Western Australia, Australia
- Party: Country

Charles Farquharson Baxter (20 May 1874 – 2 March 1950) was an Australian politician who was a Country Party member of the Legislative Council of Western Australia from 1914 until his death. He was a minister in the governments of Henry Lefroy, Hal Colebatch, and James Mitchell.

== Early life ==
Baxter was born in Croxton East, Victoria (near Hamilton), to Mary (née Barnes) and Patrick Duncan Baxter. He came to Western Australia in 1896, initially working as a butcher in Albany. He later worked as a telegraph linesman, an agent for a bicycle company, and as the director of an insurance company. Baxter eventually purchased a farming property near York.

== Politics ==
Baxter first attempted to enter parliament at the 1911 state election, but was defeated by Frederick Monger in the seat of York. At the 1914 Legislative Council elections, he was elected to East Province for the Country Party, replacing the retiring Thomas Wilding. He would be re-elected in 1920, 1926, 1932, 1938, and 1946, on each occasion unopposed.

In June 1917, when Henry Lefroy replaced Frank Wilson as premier, Baxter was made a minister without portfolio in his government. He was made Minister for Agriculture in April 1919, when Hal Colebatch became premier, but Colebatch's government lasted less than a month before James Mitchell replaced him as leader of the Nationalist Party (and thus premier). Baxter was again made a minister without portfolio under Mitchell, serving in that capacity until the 1921 state election. He returned to the ministry after the 1930 election, as Minister for Country Water Supplies and Minister for Trading Concerns.

When Norbert Keenan resigned from the ministry in late 1931, Baxter was also made Chief Secretary. He held his three portfolios until the defeat of Mitchell's government at the 1933 election. Baxter remained in parliament until his death in Perth in March 1950, aged 75.

He had married Jessica Minnie Millsom in 1896, with whom he had five children. One of his sons, Norman Eric Baxter, won the by-election occasioned by his death, and later also became a government minister. His oldest daughter Dorothy became an aerial acrobat on the early biplanes and later married WWI ace Paul McGuinness, who later started Qantas.

== See also ==
- Members of the Western Australian Legislative Council

Parliament of Western Australia
Political offices
Preceded by Henry Lefroy	Minister for Agriculture; 1919	Succeeded by Hal Colebatch
Preceded by James Cunningham	Minister for Country Water Supplies; 1930–1933	Succeeded by Alick McCallum
New creation	Minister for Trading Concerns; 1930–1933	Abolished
Preceded by Norbert Keenan	Chief Secretary; 1931–1933	Succeeded by John Drew
