= John Kirwan (politician) =

Australian politician

The Honourable Sir John Kirwan KCMG
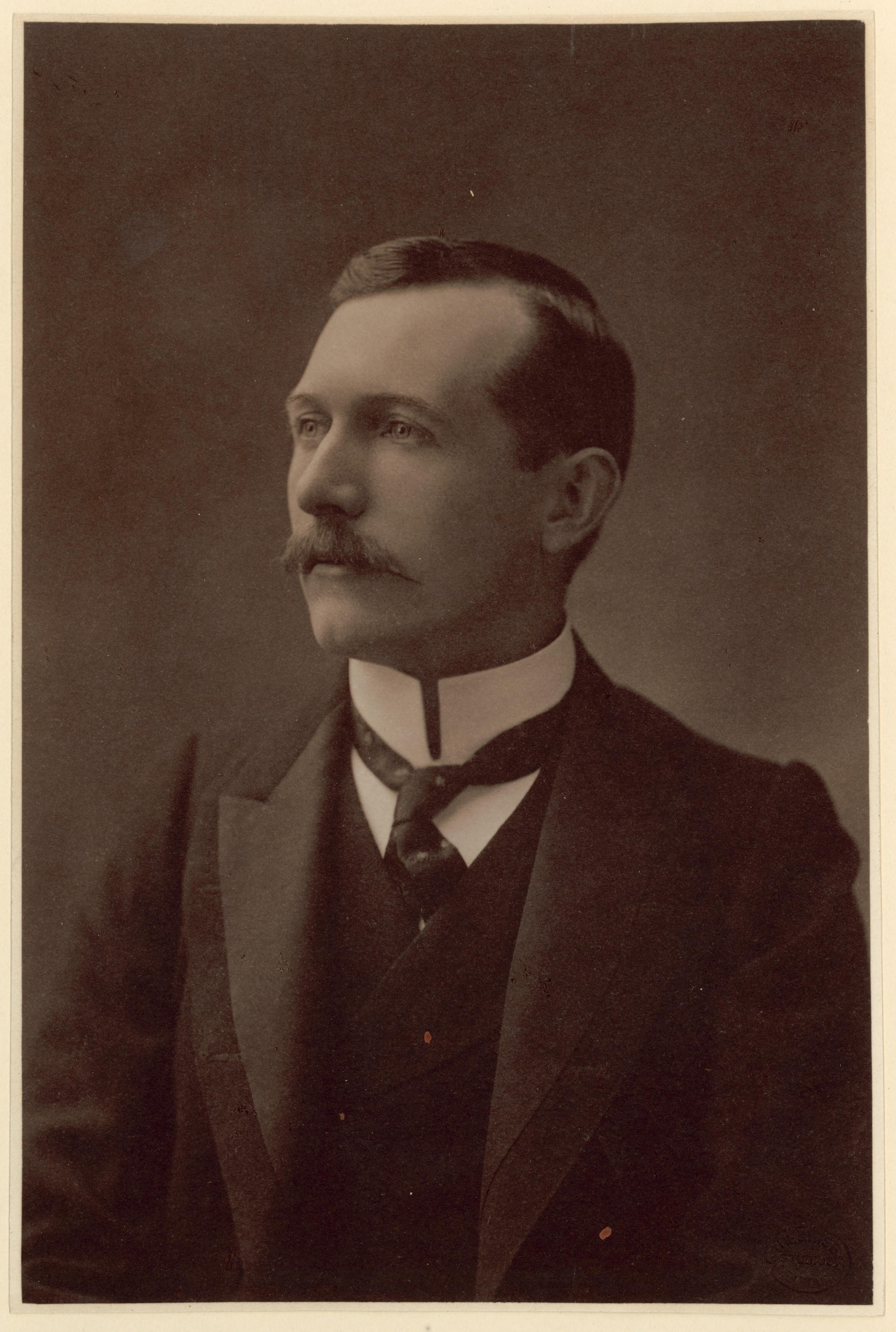

Member of the Australian Parliament for Kalgoorlie
- In office 29 March 1901 – 16 December 1903
- Preceded by: New seat
- Succeeded by: Charlie Frazer

6th President of the Western Australian Legislative Council
- In office 10 August 1926 – 21 May 1946
- Preceded by: Edward Wittenoom
- Succeeded by: James Cornell

Member of the Western Australian Legislative Council for South Province
- In office 22 May 1908 – 21 May 1946
- Preceded by: George Bellingham
- Succeeded by: George Bennetts

Personal details
- Born: 2 December 1869 Liverpool, England
- Died: 9 September 1949 (aged 79) Subiaco, Western Australia
- Party: Free Trade Party
- Spouse: Teresa Gertrude
- Occupation: Newspaper editor

Sir John Waters Kirwan, KCMG (2 December 1869 – 9 September 1949) was an Australian politician who was the President of the Western Australian Legislative Council and first Federal member for Kalgoorlie in the Australian House of Representatives.

== Early life ==
Kirwan was born on 2 December 1869 in Liverpool, England. He was the son of Irish immigrants Mary (née Waters) and Nicholas John Kirwan. His father was a "gentleman farmer" originally from County Galway, while his mother was the granddaughter of Garrett Byrne of Ballymanus, a leader of the Irish Rebellion of 1798.

== Journalism and public life ==
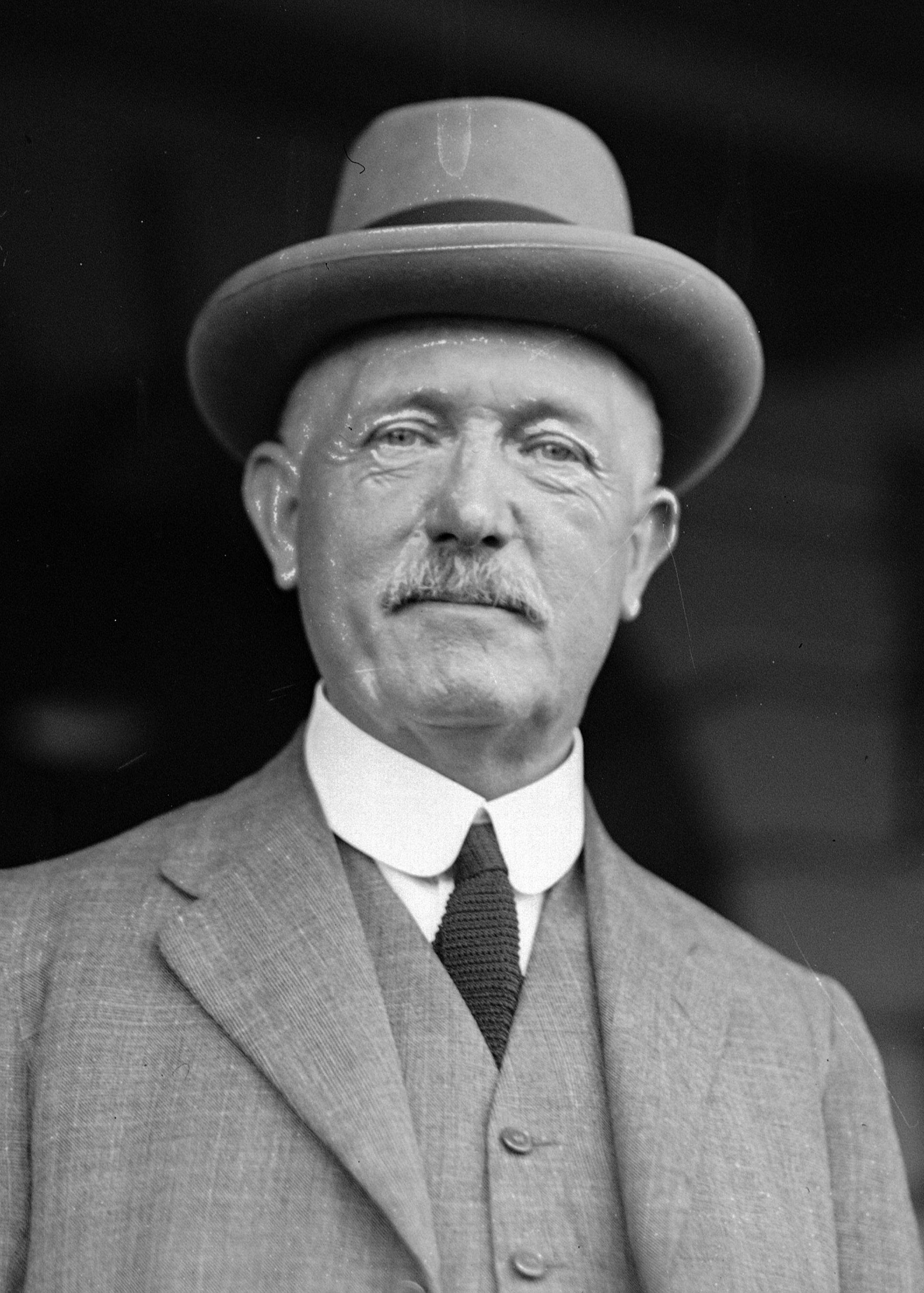
Kirwan in 1928 as president of the legislative council

He did literary work in London and Dublin before coming to Australia in 1889. At first, he continued writing in Brisbane, Melbourne and South Australian newspapers but moved to Kalgoorlie in 1895, attracted by the great gold discoveries.

In Kalgoorlie, he edited both the Western Argus and Kalgoorlie Miner newspapers, with the latter growing in size and importance under his editorship. He was posthumously inducted into the Australian Media Hall of Fame.

He served as an inaugural member on the Senate of the University of Western Australia from 1912 until 1924. He was also involved in the organising committee of the Western Australia Centenary of 1929. He was knighted in 1930 and appointed K.C.M.G. in 1947.

He was a member of the Royal Western Australian Historical Society, contributing numerous articles to Early Days and various international periodicals such as The Times and The Review of Reviews. He also wrote an autobiography in 1936.

== Politics ==
In 1898, he stood for the Legislative Council seat of North-East Province and lost by 90 votes. In 1901, he agreed to stand for the federal seat of Kalgoorlie under the Free Trade Party banner, and won the seat comfortably, becoming the youngest member of the First House of Representatives. During his time in federal politics he was a member of the Royal Commission on Iron Bonuses. He was defeated by the Labor nominee C. E. Frazer in the second federal election.

In 1908, he was elected to the Western Australian Legislative Council for the South Province, where he sat until 1946, and served as President of the Council from 1926 to 1946. Throughout his tenure, he remained an Independent, although he was an enthusiastic supporter of the Scaddan Labor government from 1911 until 1916, voting in 165 divisions with the government and none against. Following its defeat in 1916, he worked with governments of both major political persuasions and strongly advocated for his Goldfields constituency.

== Personal life ==
In 1912, he married Teresa Gertrude Quinlan, the daughter of politician Timothy Quinlan, and they had three sons (a twin male having died at birth), two grandchildren (a boy and a girl) and three great grandchildren (a girl and two boys).

Kirwan died in the Perth suburb of Subiaco in 1949.

== Notes ==
Parliament of Australia
New division	Member for Kalgoorlie; 1901–1903	Succeeded by Charlie Frazer

Western Australian Legislative Council
Preceded by George Bellingham	Member for South Province; 1908–1946	Succeeded by George Bennetts
Preceded by Edward Wittenoom	President of the Western Australian Legislative Council; 1926–1946	Succeeded by James Cornell
