= David Black (historian) =

Australian historian (1936–2024)

David William Black, AM (4 July 1936 – 23 November 2024) was an Australian historian. He lectured and wrote extensively on Australian and Western Australian history, especially political history. He was a professor in history and politics in the School of Social Sciences and Asian Languages at Curtin University of Technology until his retirement in 2002, and was then professor emeritus. He was Chairperson of the Parliamentary History Advisory Committee, and a Parliamentary Fellow (History). He has had numerous publications and considerable media exposure in regard to parliamentary history in Western Australia.

Black was appointed Member of the Order of Australia (AM) in the 2010 Australia Day Honours for "service to education and to the social sciences, particularly through the promotion and preservation of the political and parliamentary history of Western Australia".

Black died on 23 November 2024, at the age of 88.

== Publications ==
- Cohen, Barry and Black, David (1966). Australia: A Topical History. Carroll's, Perth, Western Australia.
- Black, David and Wood, Michael (1979). Western Australian Elections and Politics, 1965-1978: A Handbook and Guide. WAIT Press, Bentley, Western Australia.
- Black, David and Peachment, A. (1982). Values and Votes: The 1980 Western Australian Election. Western Australian Institute of Technology, Bentley, Western Australia.
- Black, David (1989). An index to Parliamentary Candidates in Western Australian Elections, 1890–1989. Parliament of Western Australia, Parliament House, Perth, Western Australia.
- Black, David (1989). Legislative Council of Western Australia: Membership Register, Electoral Law and Statistics 1890-1989. Parliament of Western Australia, Parliament House, Perth, Western Australia.
- Mandy, John and Black, David (eds) (1990). The Western Australian Parliamentary Handbook. Parliament of Western Australia, Parliament House, Perth, Western Australia.
- Black, David (ed) (1991). The House on the Hill: A History of the Parliament of Western Australia 1832-1990. Parliament of Western Australia, Parliament House, Perth, Western Australia.
- Black, David (ed) (1995). In His Own Words: John Curtin's Speeches and Writings. Paradigm Books, Curtin University of Technology.
- Black, David (1996). Women Parliamentarians in Australia 1921-1996: A Register of Women Members of Commonwealth, State and Territory Parliaments in Australia. Parliament of Western Australia, Parliament House, Perth, Western Australia.
- Black, David (1997). Election statistics, Legislative Assembly of Western Australia, 1890-1996. Parliament of Western Australia, Parliament House, Perth, Western Australia.
- Black, David (2000). Making a Difference: Women in the Western Australian Parliament 1921-1999. Parliament of Western Australia, Parliament House, Perth, Western Australia.
- Black, David and Bolton, Geoffrey (2001). Biographical Register of Members of the Parliament of Western Australia, Volume One, 1870–1930. Parliament of Western Australia, Parliament House, Perth, Western Australia.
- Black, David and Bolton, Geoffrey (2001). Biographical Register of Members of the Parliament of Western Australia, Volume Two, 1930–1990. Parliament of Western Australia, Parliament House, Perth, Western Australia.
- Black, David (2001). 'Friendship is a Sheltering Tree': John Curtin's Letters 1907 to 1945. John Curtin Prime Ministerial Library, Curtin University of Technology, Bentley, Western Australia.
- Black, David (2001). Reflections on Foundation Day Western Australia: Past, Present and Future. in Early Days 12(1).
- Black, David and Mandy, John (eds) (2002). The Western Australian Parliamentary Handbook. Parliament of Western Australia, Parliament House, Perth, Western Australia.
- Pendal, Phillips and Black, David (2004) House to House: The Story of Western Australia's Government and Parliament Houses over 175 years. Parliament of Western Australia, Parliament House, Perth, Western Australia.

== Sources ==
- Dyson, Noel.(2001) David never in the dark politically. Business news (Perth, W.A.), 18 Jan. 2001, p. 10,
- Kennedy, Peter (1 January 2025). "David Black obituary: Historian whose finger was always on the political pulse". The West Australian.
