= Geoffrey Bolton =

Australian historian

- Born: Geoffrey Curgenven Bolton; 5 November 1931; Perth, Western Australia
- Died: 3 September 2015 (aged 83); Perth, Western Australia
- Awards: Fellow of the Royal Historical Society; Fellow of the Australian Academy of the Humanities (1974); Fellow of the Academy of the Social Sciences in Australia (1976); Officer of the Order of Australia (1984); New South Wales Premier's Centenary of Federation Prize (2001); Western Australian of the Year (2006)

Academic background
- Education: University of Western Australia (MA); University of Oxford (MA, DPhil)

Academic work
- Institutions: Edith Cowan University (1994–96); University of Queensland (1989–93); Murdoch University (1973–89); University of Western Australia (1966–73); Monash University (1962–65); Australian National University (1957–61)
- Main interests: Australian history Biography; British Commonwealth history

Geoffrey Curgenven Bolton AO, FASSA, FAHA (5 November 1931 – 3 September 2015) was an Australian historian, academic and writer.

== Life ==
He attended Wesley College, Perth from 1943 to 1947. He published works on Australian history, authoring 13 books, his final being Land of Vision and Mirage: Western Australia since 1826.

His book, Daphne Street, published by Fremantle Press, describes his early surrounds, and is an attempt to write national history at the local level.

He was a frequent contributor to radio in Western Australia and did much to bring Western Australian history and socio-political development to life.

But can it be that the original Federation parents that you had, the founding fathers, that they're all there in their portraits...most of them have got beards and most of them are wearing suits? They look like boring old farts and that's the reason why it's hard to sell the Federation story. ...We are writing books...which will prove that they're a very lively, interesting bunch. For a long time, that image has killed the idea of excitement, though.

Part of his career was spent setting up the Australian Studies Centre (now the Menzies Centre) at the University of London in the United Kingdom.

He was Chairperson of the Western Australian Maritime Museum's Archaeology Advisory Committee.

Bolton was a Fellow of the Royal Historical Society (London), Fellow of the Academy of the Social Sciences in Australia, Fellow of the Australian Academy of the Humanities, and Fellow of the Royal Western Australian Historical Society. He served as the Chancellor of Murdoch University from 2002 to 2006.

In 2008, he published a single-volume short history of Western Australia since the start of British settlement in 1826, covering the social, cultural, political and economic development of the most geographically isolated area in the world.

Bolton died on 4 September 2015, in Perth, at the age of 83. He was married to Carol Grattan and has two sons and five grandchildren.

== Awards ==
Bolton was the recipient of several prestigious awards including his appointment as Officer of the Order of Australia (1984) in recognition of distinguished service to Australia for his services to education.

In 2001, Bolton received the Centenary of Federation prize at the New South Wales Premier's History Awards for Edmund Barton: The One Man for the Job, a biography of Australia's first Prime Minister. The one-off prize was intended to recognise a major work contributing to the understanding of Australian political, social and cultural issues during the Federation period. The biography was also shortlisted for the Colin Roderick Award (2000) and the National Biography Award (2001).

Since 2004, the State Records Office of Western Australia has hosted The Geoffrey Bolton Lecture series, acknowledging his service on various committees of the State Archive and his long period of use and promotion of archives. The aims of the Geoffrey Bolton Lecture are to encourage the expression of ideas and debate about the meaning and nature of history, culture and society, grounded in archival research; and to provide archival and historical context to national debate on contemporary issues.

In recognition of his major contribution to Australian history and the community, Bolton was named the Western Australia's Australian of the Year for 2006.

== Memorials ==
There are a number of eponymous memorials to Bolton.

In 2014 a new street, central to the Elizabeth Quay waterfront development, then under construction, was named Geoffrey Bolton Avenue in acknowledgement of the contribution made by Bolton to conserve, record and teach the history of Western Australia.

At a dedication ceremony held on 21 February 2017, Murdoch University renamed its library The Geoffrey Bolton Library to recognise Bolton's long association with the University.

We decided dedicating our Library in Geoffrey’s honour would be a fitting and lasting memorial. Our Library is considered to be the beating heart of our University, acting as a meeting place for our staff and students, a place of learning, research and community engagement. As a Foundation Professor, academic, Senate member and Chancellor, as well as being a friend and mentor to many colleagues and students, Geoffrey was also at the centre of all things Murdoch. It’s wonderful to ensure his legacy lives on in this way.

— Murdoch University Vice Chancellor, Eeva Leinonen, "Murdoch to name its Library after university icon Bolton"

== Publications ==
Citations to this author abbreviate his name to G. C. Bolton.

- Alexander Forrest: his life and times. 1958
- A Thousand Miles Away: A history of North Queensland to 1920. 1963 ISBN 9780708100486
- The Passing of the Irish Act of Union: a study in parliamentary politics. 1966
- Dick Boyer, an Australian humanist. 1967
- A fine country to starve in. 1972 ISBN 0-85564-061-8 (reprinted 1994, ISBN 1-875560-36-X)
- Britain's Legacy Overseas. 1973 ISBN 0-19-888076-6
- Spoils and spoilers : Australians make their environment 1788–1980. 1981 ISBN 0-86861-218-9 (second edition 1992, ISBN 1-86373-094-X)
- History of Royal Perth Hospital. 1982 ISBN 0-9597039-1-8
- It had better be a good one : the first ten years of Murdoch University. 1985 ISBN 0-86905-082-6
- John Ramsden Wollaston: the making of a pioneer priest. 1985 ISBN 0-9588841-0-2
- The Oxford history of Australia. Volume 5, 1942–1988 : the middle way. 1990 ISBN 0-19-554613-X
- Who owns Australia's past?. 1993 ISBN 0-7022-2578-9
- Daphne Street: The biography of an Australian community. 1996 ISBN 1-86368-167-1
- Claremont: a history. 1999 ISBN 1-876268-38-7
- Edmund Barton: The One Man for the Job. 2000 ISBN 1-86508-409-3
- The Fuss That Never Ended: The Life and Work of Geoffrey Blainey. 2003 ISBN 0-522-85034-0 (joint author with Stuart Macintyre, Deborah Gare and Tom Stannage)
- May it please Your Honour : a history of the Supreme Court of Western Australia 1861–2005. 2005 ISBN 0-9590067-7-X (with Geraldine Byrne)
- Land of Vision and Mirage: Western Australia since 1826. 2008 ISBN 978-0-9802964-0-2
- Paul Hasluck: A Life. 2014 ISBN 978-1-7425865-8-8

== Academic career ==
- Educated at the University of Western Australia and Oxford University
- Research Fellow at the Australian National University in 1957
- Senior Lecturer at Monash University in 1962
- Professor of Modern History at the University of Western Australia in 1966
- Foundation Professor of History at Murdoch University in 1973
- Pro Vice-Chancellor of Murdoch University from 1973 to 1975
- Dean of the School of Social Inquiry at Murdoch University from 1976 to 1978
- Visiting Commonwealth Fellow at St John's College, Cambridge 1978 and 1979.
- Professor and head of the Australian Studies Centre at the University of London from 1982 until 1985
- Professor of Australian History at the University of Queensland in 1989
- Professor of History at Edith Cowan University, Western Australia
- Retired from academia in 1996
- Chancellor of Murdoch University from July 2002 to November 2006.
