= John Drew (Australian politician) =

Australian politician

The Honourable John Drew MLC
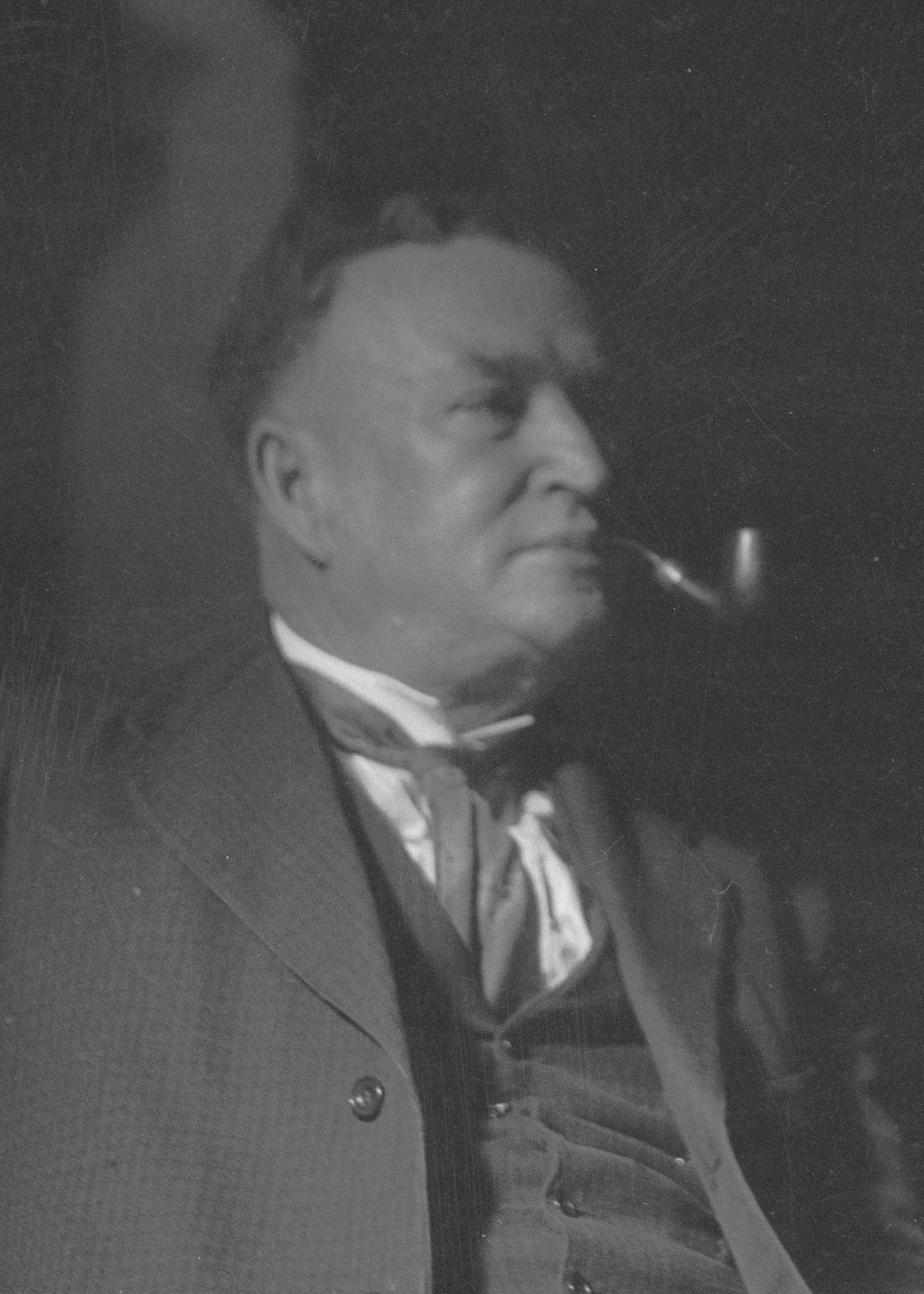
- Drew in 1927

Colonial Secretary of Western Australia
- In office 7 June 1905 – 5 August 1905
- Preceded by: George Taylor
- Succeeded by: Walter Kingsmill

Minister for Education of Western Australia
- In office 16 April 1924 – 24 April 1930
- Preceded by: John Ewing
- Succeeded by: Norbert Keenan
- In office 7 October 1911 – 27 July 1916
- Preceded by: James Connolly
- Succeeded by: Hal Colebatch

Member of the Western Australian Parliament for Central Province
- In office 14 May 1900 – 21 May 1918
- Preceded by: New position
- Succeeded by: Joshua Mills
- In office 16 April 1924 – 17 July 1947
- Preceded by: Joshua Mills
- Succeeded by: Harold Daffen

Personal details
- Born: 17 October 1865 Northampton, Western Australia
- Died: 17 July 1947 (aged 81) Perth, Western Australia, Australia
- Party: Independent (1900–1910); Labor Party (1910–1947)

John Michael Drew (17 October 1865 – 17 July 1947) was an Australian politician who served as a member of the Western Australian Legislative Council for 41 years in two separate terms between 1900 and his death in 1947. Born at Wanerenooka, Northampton, Western Australia, Drew established and edited several newspapers circulating in the Geraldton region before entering politics. A strong opponent of federation, he was elected to the Legislative Council in 1900. Nominally independent, Drew aligned himself with the Labor Party, and served in several Labor ministries during the early 1900s, in positions such as Minister for Agriculture, Minister for Lands, and Colonial Secretary. He officially joined the party in 1911, having been admitted to caucus sittings the previous year. During World War I, Drew supported conscription, but this issue, coupled with the ineffectual Scaddan Ministry, led to him losing his seat at the 1918 election. He regained his seat at the 1924 election, and subsequently served as chief secretary of the party, as well as Minister for Education, Health, and the North-West. Drew died of cancer in 1947, and was buried at Karrakatta Cemetery.
