= Parliament of Western Australia =

Bicameral legislature body of the Australian state

Coordinates: 31°57′06″S 115°50′49″E

- 41st Parliament
- Coat of arms of Western Australia

- Parliament of Western Australia logo

Type
- Type: Bicameral
- Houses: Legislative Council; Legislative Assembly
- Sovereign: King (represented by the governor of Western Australia)

History
- Founded: 30 December 1890; 135 years ago

Leadership
- Monarch: Charles III since 8 September 2022
- Governor: Chris Dawson since 15 July 2022
- President of the Legislative Council: Alanna Clohesy, Labor since 25 May 2021
- Speaker of the Legislative Assembly: Stephen Price, Labor since 8 April 2025
- Premier: Roger Cook, Labor since 8 June 2023
- Leader of the Opposition: Basil Zempilas, Liberal since 25 March 2025

Structure
- Seats: 96; 59 MLAs; 37 MLCs
- Legislative Assembly political groups: Government (45); Labor (45); Opposition (12) (Note: After the 2025 election, the Nationals and Liberals formed an opposition alliance. However, it is not a formal coalition and both parties maintain their independence from each other.); Liberal (6); National (6); Crossbench; Independent (1); One Nation (1)
- Legislative Council political groups: Government (16) Labor (16); Opposition (12); Liberal (10) (Note: After the 2021 election, the Nationals and Liberals formed an opposition alliance. However, it is not a formal coalition and both parties maintain their independence from each other.); National (2) Crossbench (9); Greens (4); One Nation (2); Animal Justice (1); Christians (1); Legalise Cannabis (1)

Elections
- Legislative Assembly voting system: Full preferential voting
- Legislative Council voting system: Single transferable vote
- Last general election: 8 March 2025
- Next general election: 10 March 2029

Meeting place
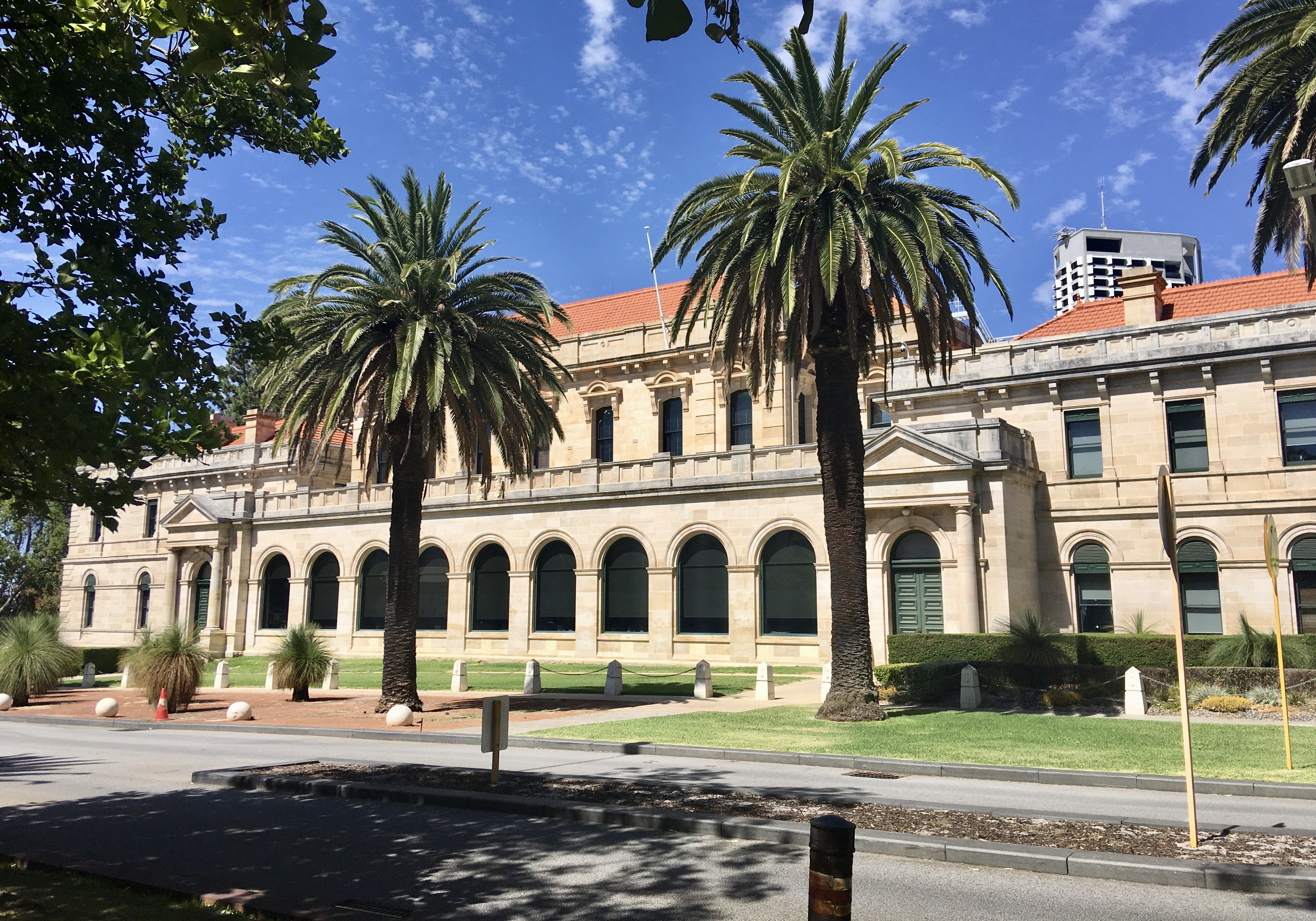
- Parliament House, Perth, Western Australia, Australia

Website
- parliament.wa.gov.au

The Parliament of Western Australia is the bicameral legislature of the Australian state of Western Australia, which constitutes the legislative branch of the state's political system. The parliament consists of the King (represented by the governor), the Legislative Council (the upper house) and the Legislative Assembly (the lower house). The two houses of parliament sit in Parliament House in the state capital, Perth.

For a bill to become law, it must be passed by both the Legislative Council and the Legislative Assembly, and receive royal assent from the Governor.

The party or coalition commanding the support of a majority of the members of the Legislative Assembly is invited by the governor to form government. The head of government holds the office of Premier of Western Australia.

Currently, the Legislative Council has 37 members elected for four-year terms from multi-member constituencies by proportional representation, and the Legislative Assembly has 59 members, elected for four-year terms from single-member constituencies, using preferential voting. As with all other Australian states and territories, enrolment to vote and voting for both Houses is compulsory for all resident Australian citizens—and eligible British citizens (i.e., those permanently resident and on the electoral roll prior to the passage of the Australia Act)—who are over the legal voting age of 18.

== History ==
The Western Australian Legislative Council was created in 1832 as an appointed body, initially including the governor as a member. In 1870 the then colony was ruled by a governor and an advisory Legislative Council made up of appointed officials and elected members. The Western Australian Legislative Assembly was created in 1890 when the then colony attained self-government. The first premier was John Forrest, who held office until 1901.

On 3 November 2011, the government introduced fixed four-year terms for Parliament, with elections being held every four years on the second Saturday in March. The 2013 state election was the first election under the fixed date system.

== Acts of Parliament ==
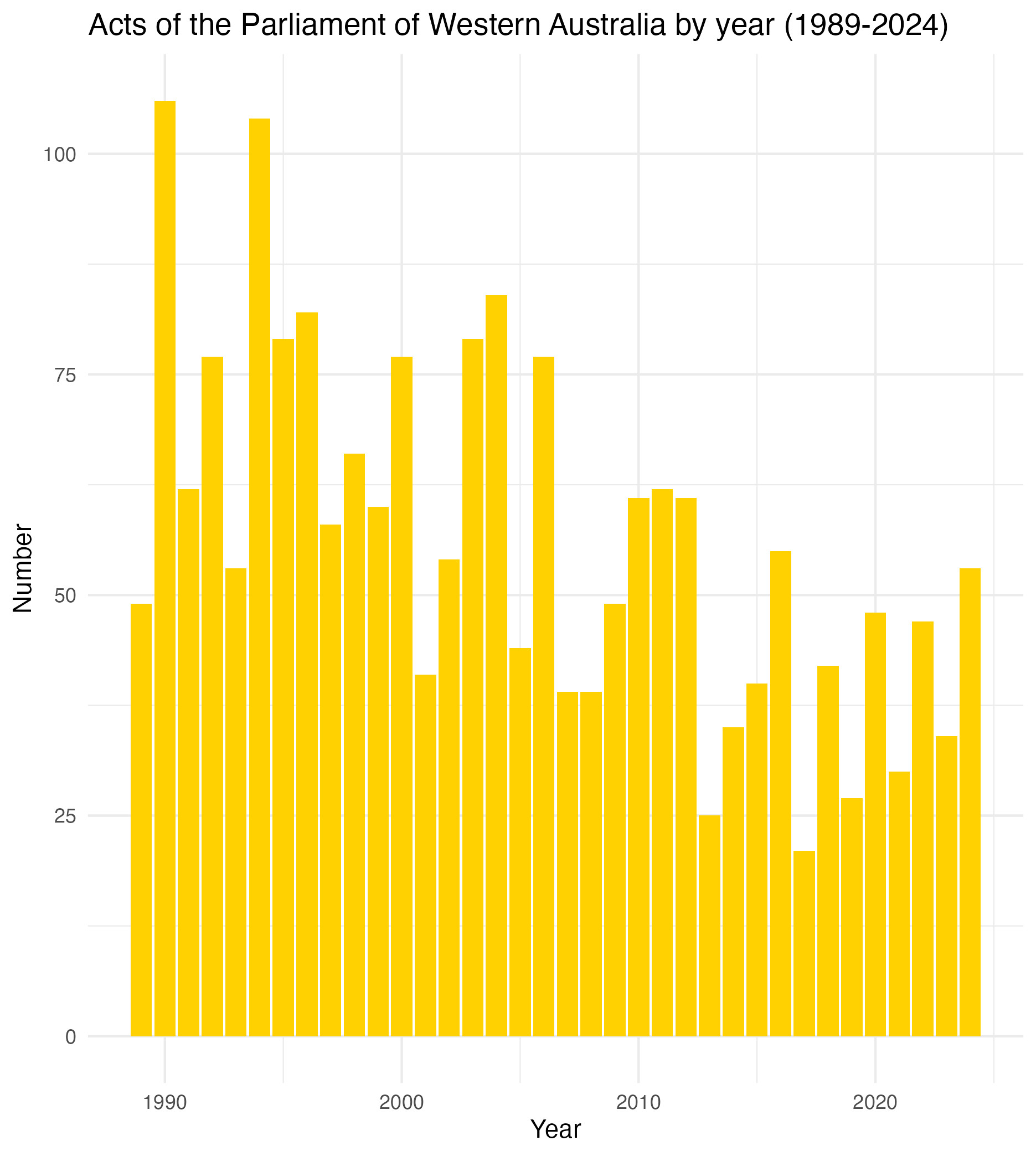
Bar chart showing the number of acts of the Parliament of Western Australia by year (1989–2024)

The oldest recorded act of Parliament in Western Australia is the Civil Court of Western Australia (1832) act, an act for establishing a Court of Civil Judicature, assented to on 10 February 1832, under the first Governor of Western Australia, James Stirling. It predates the Parliament of Western Australia and was passed by the Western Australian Legislative Council instead. All up, ten acts were passed in 1832.

Since 1832, acts have been passed in every year but 1890, the year the Western Australian Parliament was formed. The last act to be passed prior to the establishment of the Parliament was the Electoral Act 1889, assented to on 26 June 1890.

In 2023, the Western Australian Parliament passed 34 acts.

== Longest-serving members ==
Members of the Western Australian upper and lower houses with over 30 years of service.

Name	Party	Chamber	Start of tenure	End of tenure	Period of service
John Tonkin	Labor	Legislative Assembly	8 April 1933	19 February 1977	43 years, 317 days
Philip Collier	Labor	Legislative Assembly	27 October 1905	18 October 1948	42 years, 357 days
Vernon Hamersley	Country	Legislative Council	5 August 1904	24 October 1946	42 years, 80 days
John Drew	Labor	Legislative Council	14 May 1900	21 May 1918	41 years, 108 days
John Drew	Labor	Legislative Council	16 April 1924	17 July 1947	41 years, 108 days
Sydney Stubbs	Country	Legislative Council	22 May 1908	20 September 1911	39 years, 284 days
Sydney Stubbs	Country	Legislative Assembly	3 October 1911	15 March 1947	39 years, 284 days
William Johnson	Labor	Legislative Assembly	24 April 1901	27 October 1905	39 years, 215 days
William Johnson	Labor	Legislative Assembly	16 July 1906	29 September 1917	39 years, 215 days
William Johnson	Labor	Legislative Assembly	22 March 1924	26 January 1948	39 years, 215 days
Bill Grayden	Liberal	Legislative Assembly	15 March 1947	27 October 1949	39 years, 176 days
Bill Grayden	Liberal	Legislative Assembly	7 April 1956	6 February 1993	39 years, 176 days
Arthur Wilson	Labor	Legislative Assembly	11 September 1908	17 February 1947	38 years, 159 days
Sir John Kirwan	Free Trade	Legislative Council	22 May 1908	21 May 1946	37 years, 364 days
Norman Moore	Liberal	Legislative Council	22 May 1977	21 May 2013	35 years, 364 days
James Hegney	Labor	Legislative Assembly	12 April 1930	15 March 1947	35 years, 344 days
James Hegney	Labor	Legislative Assembly	25 March 1950	23 March 1968	35 years, 344 days
Charles Baxter	Country	Legislative Council	22 May 1914	2 March 1950	35 years, 284 days
Joseph Sleeman	Labor	Legislative Assembly	22 March 1924	21 March 1959	34 years, 364 days
Bert Hawke	Labor	Legislative Assembly	24 April 1933	23 March 1968	34 years, 334 days
Frank Troy	Labor	Legislative Assembly	24 June 1904	18 March 1939	34 years, 267 days
Sir Edward Wittenoom	Nationalist	Legislative Council	30 May 1883	23 January 1884	34 years, 113 days
Sir Edward Wittenoom	Nationalist	Legislative Council	25 June 1885	6 November 1886	34 years, 113 days
Sir Edward Wittenoom	Nationalist	Legislative Council	16 July 1894	28 April 1898	34 years, 113 days
Sir Edward Wittenoom	Nationalist	Legislative Council	12 May 1902	6 November 1906	34 years, 113 days
Sir Edward Wittenoom	Nationalist	Legislative Council	13 May 1910	12 May 1934	34 years, 113 days
George Miles	Independent	Legislative Council	18 September 1916	21 May 1950	33 years, 245 days
Colin Jamieson	Labor	Legislative Assembly	14 February 1953	8 February 1986	32 years, 359 days
Charles North	Liberal	Legislative Assembly	22 March 1924	7 April 1956	32 years, 16 days
Eric Heenan	Labor	Legislative Council	22 May 1936	21 May 1968	32 years, 0 days
Clive Griffiths	Liberal	Legislative Council	22 May 1965	21 May 1997	31 years, 364 days
Sir Harold Seddon	Liberal	Legislative Council	22 May 1922	21 May 1954	31 years, 364 days
Sir Ross McLarty	Labor	Legislative Assembly	12 April 1930	31 March 1962	31 years, 353 days
James Mann	Liberal	Legislative Assembly	12 April 1930	31 March 1962	31 years, 353 days
William Marshall	Labor	Legislative Assembly	12 March 1921	19 August 1952	31 years, 160 days
Michelle Roberts	Labor	Legislative Council	19 March 1994	8 March 2025	30 years, 354 days
Gilbert Fraser	Labor	Legislative Council	22 May 1928	1 November 1958	30 years, 163 days
Graham MacKinnon	Liberal	Legislative Council	22 May 1956	21 May 1986	30 years, 0 days

== See also ==
- 2021 Western Australian state election
- Parliaments of the Australian states and territories
- Lists of acts of the Parliament of Western Australia
- List of Western Australian railway-related acts
