= Vernon Hamersley =

Australian politician (1871–1946)

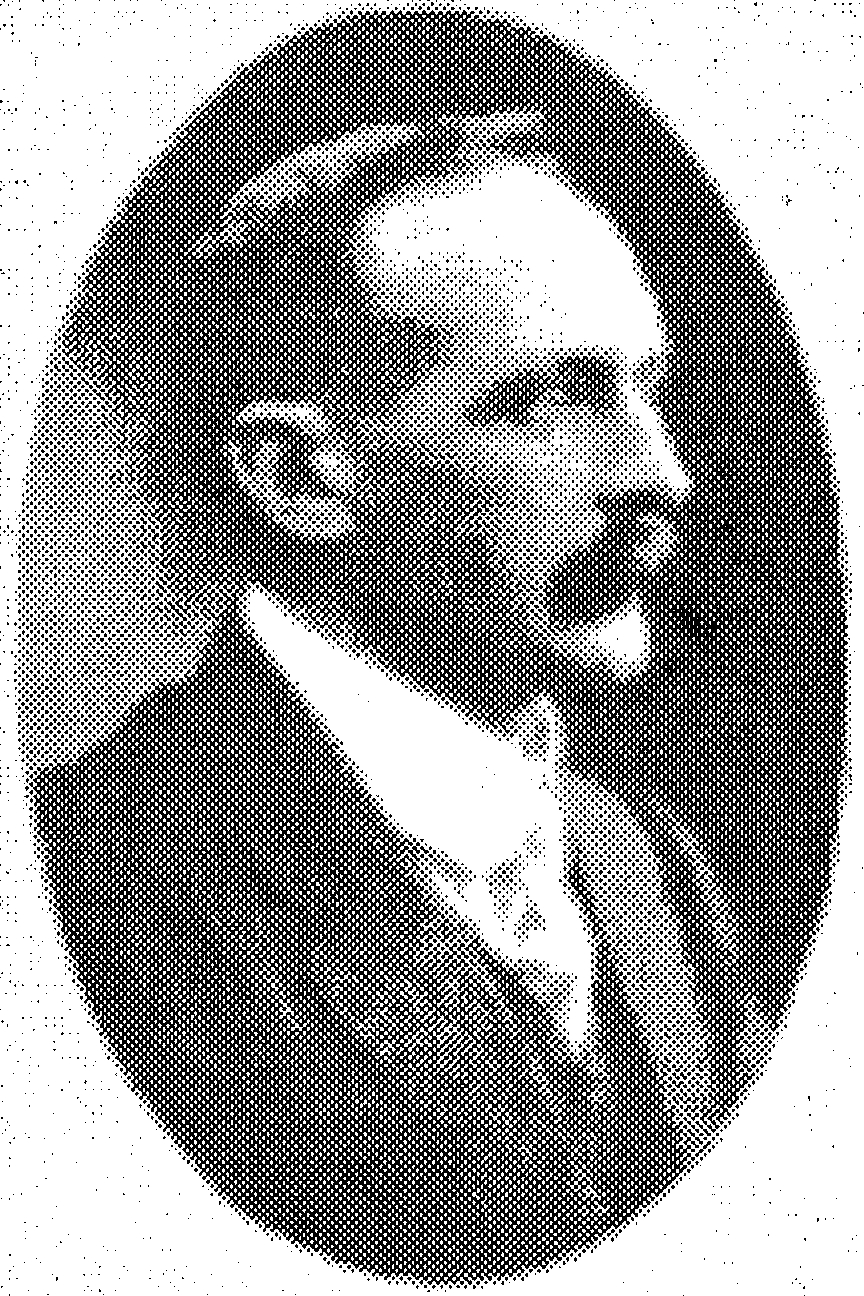
- Born: 18 March 1871; Guildford, Western Australia, Australia
- Died: 24 October 1946 (aged 75); West Perth, Western Australia, Australia
- Education: Guildford Grammar School; Magdalen College, Oxford
- Occupation: Politician
- Parent(s): Samuel Hamersley; Matilda Brown
- Relatives: Edward Hamersley, Sr. (paternal grandfather); Edward Hamersley (Jnr) (uncle); Maitland Brown (uncle)

Vernon Hamersley (1871–1946) was an Australian politician. He served the longest term ever as a Member of the Western Australian Legislative Council.

== Biography ==
=== Early life ===
Vernon Hamersley was born in Guildford, Western Australia. The son of Samuel Hamersley, he was a member of the prominent and well-connected Hamersley family. His grandfather was Edward Hamersley (Snr); among his uncles was Edward Hamersley (Jnr) and Maitland Brown; and he was related by blood or marriage to many prominent Western Australians including John Forrest and William Locke Brockman.

He was educated at Guildford Grammar School, before continuing his studies in England at the Magdalen College School at Oxford, and the Downton Agricultural College at Salisbury.

=== Career ===
He returned to Western Australia in 1889, spending some time on the Eastern goldfields, before farming with his father at York until 1895. On the death of his grandfather in 1874, he inherited the station Hasely in Toodyay, which he developed as a farm and stud. He also became a part owner of Mount Barnett cattle station in the Kimberley. In 1895, he married Clara Hicks.

He first became active in public life in 1899, becoming a member of the Toodyay Road Board. He would later become its chairman before retiring his membership in 1906. In 1900 he became a Justice of the Peace, and the following year he unsuccessfully contested the Legislative Assembly seat of Toodyay as an independent.

On 5 August 1904, he won the Legislative Council seat of East Province in a by-election following the death of Edward Keane. He would be returned to the seat in the next six elections, holding the seat until his death. He joined the Liberal Party in 1911.

He won the May 1916 election by a single vote. Upon a recount, both Hamersley and his opponent, Michael McCabe of the Country Party, had attained 1,651 votes each, and Hamersley was elected on the casting vote of the Returning Officer. McCabe then petitioned the Court of Disputed Returns against Hamersley's election, with the result that the election was declared null and void. Hamersley appealed to the full court, but the appeal was dismissed. A by-election was subsequently held on 2 September 1916, with Hamersley winning re-election on a significantly higher turnout.

After 1920, he held his seat for the Country Party, and from April 1921 he was Father of the House.

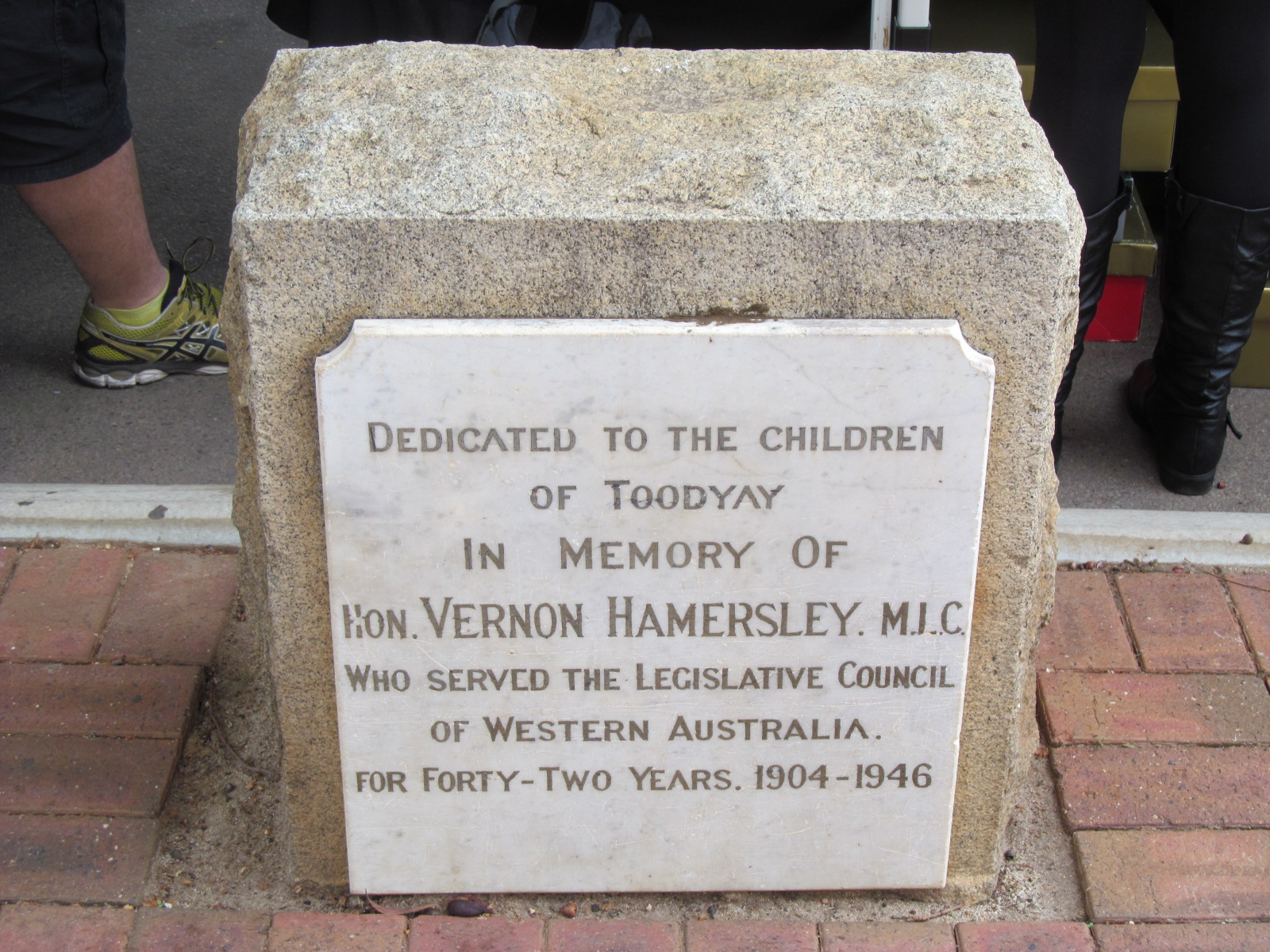
Plaque honouring Vernon Hamersley in Toodyay

=== Death ===
He died in West Perth on 24 October 1946. His term of 42 years, 2 months and 19 days remains the longest ever term as a member of the Western Australian Legislative Council.
