= South Province (Western Australia) =

South Province was an electoral province of the Legislative Council of Western Australia between 1900 and 1989. It elected three members between 1900 and 1965 and two members between 1965 and 1989.

== Members ==
Three members (1900–1965)
Member 1	Party	Term	Member 2	Party	Term	Member 3	Party	Term
Thomas Brimage	None	1900–1906	John Glowrey	None	1900–1904	George Bellingham	None	1900–1908
Thomas Brimage	None	1900–1906	William Oats	None	1904–1910	George Bellingham	None	1900–1908
John Glowrey	None	1906–1910	William Oats	None	1904–1910	George Bellingham	None	1900–1908
John Glowrey	None	1906–1910	William Oats	None	1904–1910	Sir John Kirwan	None	1908–1910
John Glowrey	Independent	1910–1912	Jabez Dodd	Labor	1910–1917	Sir John Kirwan	Independent	1910–1946
James Cornell	Labor	1912–1917	Jabez Dodd	Labor	1910–1917	Sir John Kirwan	Independent	1910–1946
James Cornell	Nat. Labor	1917–1924	Jabez Dodd	Nat. Labor	1917–1924	Sir John Kirwan	Independent	1910–1946
James Cornell	Nationalist	1924–1945	Jabez Dodd	Nationalist	1924–1928	Sir John Kirwan	Independent	1910–1946
James Cornell	Nationalist	1924–1945	George Rainsford	Nationalist	1928	Sir John Kirwan	Independent	1910–1946
James Cornell	Nationalist	1924–1945	Charles Williams	Labor	1928–1948	Sir John Kirwan	Independent	1910–1946
James Cornell	Liberal	1945–1946	Charles Williams	Labor	1928–1948	Sir John Kirwan	Independent	1910–1946
James Cornell	Liberal	1945–1946	Charles Williams	Labor	1928–1948	George Bennetts	Labor	1946–1950
Robert Boylen	Labor	1947–1950	Charles Williams	Labor	1928–1948	George Bennetts	Labor	1946–1950
Robert Boylen	Labor	1947–1950	John Cunningham	Liberal	1948–1950	George Bennetts	Labor	1946–1950
Major reconstitution in 1950 – existing South Province members effectively swapped with existing South-East Province members.
Jack Thomson	Country	1950–1965	Hugh Roche	Country	1950–1960	Anthony Loton	Country	1950–1965
Jack Thomson	Country	1950–1965	Sydney Thompson	Country	1960–1965	Anthony Loton	Country	1950–1965

Two members (1965–1989)
Member 1	Party	Term	Member 2	Party	Term
Edward House	Country	1965–1971	Jack Thomson	Country	1965–1974
David Wordsworth	Liberal	1971–1989	Jack Thomson	Country	1965–1974
David Wordsworth	Liberal	1971–1989	Thomas Knight	Liberal	1974–1986
David Wordsworth	Liberal	1971–1989	John Caldwell	National	1986–1989
