= South-West Province (Western Australia) =

South-West Province was an electoral province of the Legislative Council of Western Australia between 1894 and 1989. It elected three members between 1894 and 1965 and two members between 1965 and 1989.

== Members ==
Three members (1894–1965)
Member 1	Party	Term	Member 2	Party	Term	Member 3	Party	Term
Sir J. W. Hackett	None	1894–1911	Edward McLarty	None	1894–1911	John Foulkes	None	1894–1896
Sir J. W. Hackett	None	1894–1911	Edward McLarty	None	1894–1911	William Spencer	None	1896–1901
Sir J. W. Hackett	None	1894–1911	Edward McLarty	None	1894–1911	Ephraim Clarke	None	1901–1911
Sir J. W. Hackett	Liberal	1911–1916	Edward McLarty	Liberal	1911–1916	Ephraim Clarke	Liberal	1911–1917
John Ewing	Liberal	1916–1917	Edwin Rose	Liberal	1916–1917	Ephraim Clarke	Liberal	1911–1917
John Ewing	Nationalist	1917–1933	Edwin Rose	Nationalist	1917–1934	Ephraim Clarke	Nationalist	1917–1921
John Ewing	Nationalist	1917–1933	Edwin Rose	Nationalist	1917–1934	F. E. S. Willmott	Country	1921–1926
John Ewing	Nationalist	1917–1933	Edwin Rose	Nationalist	1917–1934	William Mann	Nationalist	1926–1945
Les Craig	Nationalist	1934–1945	Hobart Tuckey	Nationalist	1934–1945	William Mann	Nationalist	1926–1945
Les Craig	Liberal	1945–1956	Hobart Tuckey	Liberal	1945–1951	William Mann	Liberal	1945–1951
Les Craig	Liberal	1945–1956	Charles Henning	Liberal	1951–1955	James Murray	Liberal	1951–1965
Les Craig	Liberal	1945–1956	F. D. Willmott	Liberal	1955–1965	James Murray	Liberal	1951–1965
Graham MacKinnon	Liberal	1956–1965	F. D. Willmott	Liberal	1955–1965	James Murray	Liberal	1951–1965

Two members (1965–1989)
Member 1	Party	Term	Member 2	Party	Term
Vic Ferry	Liberal	1965–1987	F. D. Willmott	Liberal	1965–1974
Vic Ferry	Liberal	1965–1987	Graham MacKinnon	Liberal	1974–1986
Vic Ferry	Liberal	1965–1987	Doug Wenn	Labor	1986–1989
Barry House	Liberal	1987–1989	Doug Wenn	Labor	1986–1989
