= North-East Province (Western Australia) =

Former electoral province of Western Australia

North-East Province Western Australia—Legislative Council
- State: Western Australia
- Created: 1897
- Abolished: 1965

North-East Province was an electoral province of the Legislative Council of Western Australia between 1897 and 1965. It elected three members throughout its existence.

== Members ==
Three members (1897–1965)
Member 1	Party	Term	Member 2	Party	Term	Member 3	Party	Term
Alexander Matheson	None	1897–1901	Harold George Parsons	None	1897–1900	Andrew Henning	None	1897–1898
Alexander Matheson	None	1897–1901	Harold George Parsons	None	1897–1900	Arthur Jenkins	None	1898–1904
Alexander Matheson	None	1897–1901	Charles Sommers	None	1900–1906	Arthur Jenkins	None	1898–1904
James Connolly	None	1901–1911	Charles Sommers	None	1900–1906	Arthur Jenkins	None	1898–1904
James Connolly	None	1901–1911	Charles Sommers	None	1900–1906	Robert McKenzie	None	1904–1911
James Connolly	None	1901–1911	Thomas Brimage	None	1906–1911	Robert McKenzie	None	1904–1911
James Connolly	Liberal	1911–1914	Thomas Brimage	Independent	1911–1912	Robert McKenzie	Liberal	1911–1916
James Connolly	Liberal	1911–1914	Dick Ardagh	Labor	1912–1917	Robert McKenzie	Liberal	1911–1916
Harry Millington	Labor	1914–1920	Dick Ardagh	Labor	1912–1917	Robert McKenzie	Liberal	1911–1916
Harry Millington	Labor	1914–1920	Dick Ardagh	Labor	1912–1917	James Griffiths	Labor	1916
Harry Millington	Labor	1914–1920	Dick Ardagh	Labor	1912–1917	James Cunningham	Labor	1916–1922
Harry Millington	Labor	1914–1920	Dick Ardagh	Nat. Labor	1917–1924	James Cunningham	Labor	1916–1922
Edgar Harris	Nationalist	1920–1934	Dick Ardagh	Nat. Labor	1917–1924	James Cunningham	Labor	1916–1922
Edgar Harris	Nationalist	1920–1934	Dick Ardagh	Nat. Labor	1917–1924	Sir Harold Seddon	Nationalist	1922–1945
Edgar Harris	Nationalist	1920–1934	John Brown	Labor	1924–1930	Sir Harold Seddon	Nationalist	1922–1945
Edgar Harris	Nationalist	1920–1934	Frederick Allsop	Nationalist	1930–1932	Sir Harold Seddon	Nationalist	1922–1945
Edgar Harris	Nationalist	1920–1934	Richard Moore	Nationalist	1932–1936	Sir Harold Seddon	Nationalist	1922–1945
Charles Elliott	Nationalist	1934–1938	Richard Moore	Nationalist	1932–1936	Sir Harold Seddon	Nationalist	1922–1945
Charles Elliott	Nationalist	1934–1938	Eric Heenan	Labor	1936–1965	Sir Harold Seddon	Nationalist	1922–1945
William Hall	Labor	1938–1963	Eric Heenan	Labor	1936–1965	Sir Harold Seddon	Nationalist	1922–1945
William Hall	Labor	1938–1963	Eric Heenan	Labor	1936–1965	Sir Harold Seddon	Liberal	1945–1954
William Hall	Labor	1938–1963	Eric Heenan	Labor	1936–1965	John Teahan	Labor	1954–1965
David Dellar	Labor	1963–1965	Eric Heenan	Labor	1936–1965	John Teahan	Labor	1954–1965
