= Members of the Western Australian Legislative Council, 1924–1926 =

This is a list of members of the Western Australian Legislative Council from 22 May, 1924 to 21 May, 1926. The chamber had 30 seats made up of ten provinces each electing three members, on a system of rotation whereby one-third of the members would retire at each biennial election. In the previous term, the Country Party split into rival Ministerial (MCP) and Executive (ECP) factions. The Executive faction, loyal to the Primary Producers' Association, prevailed and by 1925 the Ministerial faction had merged with the remnants of the National Labor Party into the Nationalist Party.

| Name | Party | Province | Term expires | Years in office |
|---|---|---|---|---|
| Charles Baxter | Country | East | 1926 | 1914–1950 |
| John Reid Brown | Labor | North-East | 1930 | 1924–1930 |
| Alfred Burvill | Country | South-East | 1928 | 1922–1928 |
| James Cornell | National Labor / Nationalist | South | 1930 | 1912–1946 |
| Jabez Dodd | National Labor/ Nationalist | South | 1928 | 1910–1928 |
| John Drew | Labor | Central | 1930 | 1900–1918; 1924–1947 |
| Joseph Duffell | Nationalist | Metropolitan-Suburban | 1926 | 1914–1926 |
| John Ewing | Nationalist | South-West | 1930 | 1916–1933 |
| William Glasheen^{[1]} | Country | South-East | 1926 | 1925–1932 |
| Edmund Gray | Labor | West | 1926 | 1923–1952 |
| James Greig^{[1]} | Country | South-East | 1926 | 1916–1925 |
| Vernon Hamersley | Country | East | 1928 | 1904–1946 |
| Edgar Harris | Nationalist | North-East | 1926 | 1920–1934 |
| James Hickey | Labor | Central | 1928 | 1916–1928 |
| Joseph Holmes | Independent | North | 1926 | 1914–1942 |
| John Kirwan | Independent | South | 1926 | 1908–1946 |
| William Kitson | Labor | West | 1930 | 1924–1947 |
| Arthur Lovekin | Nationalist | Metropolitan | 1930 | 1919–1931 |
| James Macfarlane | Nationalist | Metropolitan | 1928 | 1922–1928; 1930–1942 |
| George Miles | Independent | North | 1930 | 1916–1950 |
| Thomas Moore | Labor | Central | 1926 | 1920–1926; 1932–1946 |
| John Nicholson | Nationalist | Metropolitan | 1926 | 1918–1941 |
| George Potter | Nationalist | West | 1928 | 1922–1928 |
| Edwin Rose | Nationalist | South-West | 1928 | 1916–1934 |
| Athelstan Saw | Nationalist | Metropolitan-Suburban | 1928 | 1915–1929 |
| Harold Seddon | Nationalist | North-East | 1928 | 1922–1954 |
| Henry Stephenson | Nationalist | Metropolitan-Suburban | 1930 | 1924–1930 |
| Hector Stewart | Country | South-East | 1930 | 1917–1931 |
| Francis Willmott | Country | South-West | 1926 | 1921–1926 |
| Sir Edward Wittenoom | Nationalist | North | 1928 | 1883–1884; 1885–1886; 1894–1898; 1902–1906; 1910–1934 |
| Herbert Yelland | MCP/Nationalist | East | 1930 | 1924–1936 |

== Notes ==
^{1} On 22 June 1925, South-East Country MLC James Greig died. Country candidate William Glasheen won the resulting by-election on 18 July 1925.

== Sources ==
- Black, David (1991). Legislative Council of Western Australia : membership register, electoral law and statistics, 1890-1989. Perth: Parliamentary History Project. ISBN 0-7309-3641-4.
- Hughes, Colin A.; Aitkin, Don (1986). Voting for the Australian State Upper Houses, 1890-1984. Canberra: Australian National University. ISBN 0-909779-18-X.
- Black, David; Bolton, Geoffrey (2001a). Biographical Register of Members of the Parliament of Western Australia. Vol. One: 1870–1930 (Revised ed.). Parliament House: Parliament of Western Australia. ISBN 0730738140.
