= Members of the Western Australian Legislative Council, 1926–1928 =

This is a list of members of the Western Australian Legislative Council from 22 May 1926 to 21 May 1928. The chamber had 30 seats made up of ten provinces each electing three members, on a system of rotation whereby one-third of the members would retire at each biennial election.

Name	Party	Province	Term expires	Years in office
Charles Baxter	Country	East	1932	1914–1950
John Reid Brown	Labor	North-East	1930	1924–1930
Alfred Burvill	Country	South-East	1928	1922–1928
James Cornell	Nationalist	South	1930	1912–1946
Jabez Dodd^{[1]}	Nationalist	South	1928	1910–1928
John Drew	Labor	Central	1930	1900–1918; 1924–1947
John Ewing	Nationalist	South-West	1930	1916–1933
William Glasheen	Country	South-East	1932	1925–1932
Edmund Gray	Labor	West	1932	1923–1952
Vernon Hamersley	Country	East	1928	1904–1946
Edgar Harris	Nationalist	North-East	1932	1920–1934
James Hickey	Labor	Central	1928	1916–1928
Joseph Holmes	Independent	North	1932	1914–1942
George Kempton	Country	Central	1932	1926–1932
John Kirwan	Independent	South	1932	1908–1946
William Kitson	Labor	West	1930	1924–1947
Sir William Lathlain	Nationalist	Metropolitan-Suburban	1932	1926–1932
Arthur Lovekin	Nationalist	Metropolitan	1930	1919–1931
James Macfarlane	Nationalist	Metropolitan	1928	1922–1928; 1930–1942
William Mann	Nationalist	South-West	1932	1926–1951
George Miles	Independent	North	1930	1916–1950
John Nicholson	Nationalist	Metropolitan	1932	1918–1941
George Potter	Nationalist	West	1928	1922–1928
George Rainsford^{[1]}	Nationalist	South	1928	1928
Edwin Rose	Nationalist	South-West	1928	1916–1934
Athelstan Saw	Nationalist	Metropolitan-Suburban	1928	1915–1929
Harold Seddon	Nationalist	North-East	1928	1922–1954
Henry Stephenson	Nationalist	Metropolitan-Suburban	1930	1924–1930
Hector Stewart	Country	South-East	1930	1917–1931
Sir Edward Wittenoom	Nationalist	North	1928	1883–1884; 1885–1886; 1894–1898; 1902–1906; 1910–1934
Herbert Yelland	Nationalist	East	1930	1924–1936

== Notes ==
^{1} On 2 January 1928, South Province Nationalist MLC Jabez Dodd died. Nationalist candidate George Rainsford won the resulting by-election on 11 February 1928—however, he was not sworn in and did not take his seat, and was defeated at the Council elections three months later.

== Sources ==
- Black, David (1991). Legislative Council of Western Australia : membership register, electoral law and statistics, 1890-1989. Perth: Parliamentary History Project. ISBN 0-7309-3641-4.
- Hughes, Colin A.; Aitkin, Don (1986). Voting for the Australian State Upper Houses, 1890-1984. Canberra: Australian National University. ISBN 0-909779-18-X.
- Black, David; Bolton, Geoffrey (2001a). Biographical Register of Members of the Parliament of Western Australia. Vol. One: 1870–1930 (Revised ed.). Parliament House: Parliament of Western Australia. ISBN 0730738140.
