= Members of the Western Australian Legislative Council, 1920–1922 =

This is a list of members of the Western Australian Legislative Council from 22 May 1920 to 21 May 1922. The chamber had 30 seats made up of ten provinces each electing three members, on a system of rotation whereby one-third of the members would retire at each biennial election.

Name	Party	Province	Term expires	Years in office
Richard Ardagh	National Labor	North-East	1924	1912–1924
Frederick Baglin	Labor	West	1926	1920–1923
Charles Baxter	Country	East	1926	1914–1950
Ephraim Clarke^{[1]}	Nationalist	South-West	1926	1901–1921
Hal Colebatch	Nationalist	East	1924	1912–1923
James Cornell	National Labor	South	1924	1912–1946
James Cunningham	Labor	North-East	1922	1916–1922
Jabez Dodd	National Labor	South	1922	1910–1928
Joseph Duffell	Nationalist	Metropolitan-Suburban	1926	1914–1926
John Ewing	Nationalist	South-West	1924	1916–1933
James Greig	Country	South-East	1926	1916–1925
Vernon Hamersley	Country	East	1922	1904–1946
Edgar Harris	Nationalist	North-East	1926	1920–1934
James Hickey	Labor	Central	1922	1916–1928
Joseph Holmes	Independent	North	1926	1914–1942
Walter Kingsmill	Independent	Metropolitan	1922	1903–1922
John Kirwan	Independent	South	1926	1908–1946
Arthur Lovekin	Nationalist	Metropolitan	1924	1919–1931
Robert Lynn	Nationalist	West	1924	1912–1924
Cuthbert McKenzie	Country	South-East	1922	1910–1922
George Miles	Independent	North	1924	1916–1950
Joshua Mills	Ind. Nat.	Central	1924	1918–1924
Thomas Moore	Labor	Central	1926	1920–1926; 1932–1946
John Nicholson	Nationalist	Metropolitan	1926	1918–1941
Alexander Panton	Labor	West	1922	1919–1922
Edwin Rose	Nationalist	South-West	1922	1916–1934
Archibald Sanderson	Nationalist	Metropolitan-Suburban	1924	1912–1922
Athelstan Saw	Nationalist	Metropolitan-Suburban	1922	1915–1929
Hector Stewart	Nationalist	South-East	1924	1917–1931
Francis Willmott^{[1]}	Country	South-West	1926	1921–1926
Sir Edward Wittenoom	Nationalist	North	1922	1883–1884; 1885–1886; 1894–1898; 1902–1906; 1910–1934

== Notes ==
^{1} On 15 April 1921, South-West Province Nationalist MLC Ephraim Clarke died. Country candidate Francis Willmott won the resulting by-election on 21 May 1921.

== Sources ==
- Black, David (1991). Legislative Council of Western Australia : membership register, electoral law and statistics, 1890-1989. Perth: Parliamentary History Project. ISBN 0-7309-3641-4.
- Hughes, Colin A.; Aitkin, Don (1986). Voting for the Australian State Upper Houses, 1890-1984. Canberra: Australian National University. ISBN 0-909779-18-X.
- Black, David; Bolton, Geoffrey (2001a). Biographical Register of Members of the Parliament of Western Australia. Vol. One: 1870–1930 (Revised ed.). Parliament House: Parliament of Western Australia. ISBN 0730738140.
