= Members of the Western Australian Legislative Council, 1918–1920 =

This is a list of members of the Western Australian Legislative Council from 22 May 1918 to 21 May 1920. The chamber had 30 seats made up of ten provinces each electing three members, on a system of rotation whereby one-third of the members would retire at each biennial election.

Name	Party	Province	Term expires	Years in office
Joseph Allen	Nationalist	West	1920	1914–1920
Richard Ardagh	National Labor	North-East	1924	1912–1924
Charles Baxter^{[1]}	Country	East	1920	1914–1950
Sir Henry Briggs^{[2]}	Nationalist	West	1922	1896–1919
Henry Carson	Country	Central	1920	1914–1920
Ephraim Clarke	Nationalist	South-West	1920	1901–1921
Hal Colebatch	Nationalist	East	1924	1912–1923
James Cornell	National Labor	South	1924	1912–1946
James Cunningham	Labor	North-East	1922	1916–1922
Jabez Dodd	National Labor	South	1922	1910–1928
Joseph Duffell	Nationalist	Metropolitan-Suburban	1920	1914–1926
John Ewing	Nationalist	South-West	1924	1916–1933
James Greig	Country	South-East	1920	1916–1925
Vernon Hamersley	Nationalist	East	1922	1904–1946
James Hickey	Labor	Central	1922	1916–1928
Joseph Holmes	Independent	North	1920	1914–1942
Walter Kingsmill	Nationalist	Metropolitan	1922	1903–1922
John Kirwan	Independent	South	1920	1908–1946
Arthur Lovekin^{[3]}	Nationalist	Metropolitan	1924	1919–1931
Robert Lynn	Nationalist	West	1924	1912–1924
Cuthbert McKenzie	Country	South-East	1922	1910–1922
George Miles	Independent	North	1924	1916–1950
Joshua Mills	Ind. Nat.	Central	1924	1918–1924
Harry Millington	Labor	North-East	1920	1914–1920
John Nicholson	Nationalist	Metropolitan	1920	1918–1941
Alexander Panton^{[2]}	Labor	West	1922	1919–1922
Edwin Rose	Nationalist	South-West	1922	1916–1934
Archibald Sanderson	Nationalist	Metropolitan-Suburban	1924	1912–1922
Henry Saunders^{[3]}	Independent	Metropolitan	1924	1894–1902; 1918–1919
Athelstan Saw	Nationalist	Metropolitan-Suburban	1922	1915–1929
Hector Stewart	Country	South-East	1924	1917–1931
Sir Edward Wittenoom	Nationalist	North	1922	1883–1884; 1885–1886; 1894–1898; 1902–1906; 1910–1934

== Notes ==
^{1} On 17 April 1919, East Province Country LC Charles Baxter was appointed Minister for Agriculture in the new Ministry led by Hal Colebatch. He was therefore required to resign and contest a ministerial by-election, at which he was returned unopposed on 3 May 1919.
^{2} On 8 June 1919, West Province Nationalist MLC Sir Henry Briggs died. Labor candidate Alexander Panton won the resulting by-election on 5 July 1919.
^{3} On 13 October 1919, Metropolitan Province Independent MLC Henry Saunders died. Nationalist candidate Arthur Lovekin won the resulting by-election on 15 November 1919.

== Sources ==
- Black, David (1991). Legislative Council of Western Australia : membership register, electoral law and statistics, 1890-1989. Perth: Parliamentary History Project. ISBN 0-7309-3641-4.
- Hughes, Colin A.; Aitkin, Don (1986). Voting for the Australian State Upper Houses, 1890-1984. Canberra: Australian National University. ISBN 0-909779-18-X.
- Black, David; Bolton, Geoffrey (2001a). Biographical Register of Members of the Parliament of Western Australia. Vol. One: 1870–1930 (Revised ed.). Parliament House: Parliament of Western Australia. ISBN 0730738140.
