= Members of the Western Australian Legislative Council, 1928–1930 =

This is a list of members of the Western Australian Legislative Council from 22 May 1928 to 21 May 1930. The chamber had 30 seats made up of ten provinces each electing three members, on a system of rotation whereby one-third of the members would retire at each biennial election.

Name	Party	Province	Term expires	Years in office
Charles Baxter^{[2]}	Country	East	1932	1914–1950
John Reid Brown^{[3]}	Labor	North-East	1930	1924–1930
James Cornell	Nationalist	South	1930	1912–1946
John Drew	Labor	Central	1930	1900–1918; 1924–1947
John Ewing	Nationalist	South-West	1930	1916–1933
James Franklin	Nationalist	Metropolitan	1934	1928–1940
Gilbert Fraser	Labor	West	1934	1928–1958
William Glasheen	Country	South-East	1932	1925–1932
Edmund Gray	Labor	West	1932	1923–1952
Edmund Hall	Country	Central	1934	1928–1947
Vernon Hamersley	Country	East	1934	1904–1946
Edgar Harris	Nationalist	North-East	1932	1920–1934
Joseph Holmes	Independent	North	1932	1914–1942
George Kempton	Country	Central	1932	1926–1932
John Kirwan	Independent	South	1932	1908–1946
William Kitson	Labor	West	1930	1924–1947
Sir William Lathlain	Nationalist	Metropolitan-Suburban	1932	1926–1932
Arthur Lovekin	Nationalist	Metropolitan	1930	1919–1931
William Mann	Nationalist	South-West	1932	1926–1951
George Miles	Independent	North	1930	1916–1950
Sir Charles Nathan^{[1]}	Nationalist	Metropolitan-Suburban	1934	1930–1934
John Nicholson	Nationalist	Metropolitan	1932	1918–1941
Edwin Rose	Nationalist	South-West	1934	1916–1934
Athelstan Saw^{[1]}	Nationalist	Metropolitan-Suburban	1934	1915–1929
Harold Seddon	Nationalist	North-East	1934	1922–1954
Henry Stephenson	Nationalist	Metropolitan-Suburban	1930	1924–1930
Hector Stewart	Country	South-East	1930	1917–1931
Charles Williams	Labor	South	1934	1928–1948
Charles Wittenoom	Country	South-East	1934	1928–1940
Sir Edward Wittenoom	Nationalist	North	1934	1883–1884; 1885–1886; 1894–1898; 1902–1906; 1910–1934
Herbert Yelland	Nationalist	East	1930	1924–1936

== Notes ==
^{1} On 28 November 1929, Metropolitan-Suburban Province Nationalist MLC Athelstan Saw died. Nationalist candidate Charles Nathan won the resulting by-election on 11 January 1930.
^{2} On 24 April 1930, East Province Country MLC Charles Baxter was appointed Minister for Country Water Supplies and Trading Concerns in the new Ministry led by Sir James Mitchell. He was therefore required to resign and contest a ministerial by-election, at which he was returned unopposed on 1 May 1930.
^{3} On 24 February 1930, North-East Province Labor MLC John Reid Brown died. The seat remained vacant until the 1930 elections on 10 May.

== Sources ==
- Black, David (1991). Legislative Council of Western Australia : membership register, electoral law and statistics, 1890-1989. Perth: Parliamentary History Project. ISBN 0-7309-3641-4.
- Hughes, Colin A.; Aitkin, Don (1986). Voting for the Australian State Upper Houses, 1890-1984. Canberra: Australian National University. ISBN 0-909779-18-X.
- Black, David; Bolton, Geoffrey (2001a). Biographical Register of Members of the Parliament of Western Australia. Vol. One: 1870–1930 (Revised ed.). Parliament House: Parliament of Western Australia. ISBN 0730738140.
