= Members of the Western Australian Legislative Council, 1902–1904 =

This is a list of members of the Western Australian Legislative Council from 12 May 1902 to 30 May 1904. The chamber had 30 seats made up of ten provinces each electing three members, on a system of rotation whereby one-third of the members would retire at each biennial election.

Name	Province	Term expires	Years in office
George Bellingham	South	1908	1900–1908
Henry Briggs	West	1904	1896–1919
Thomas Brimage	South	1906	1900–1912
William Brookman^{[5]}	Metropolitan-Suburban	1906	1900–1903
Richard Burges^{[3]}	East	1904	1894–1903
Ephraim Clarke	South-West	1908	1901–1921
James Connolly	North-East	1908	1901–1914
Frederick Crowder^{[1]}	East	1908	1894–1900; 1901–1902
Andrew Dempster^{[3]}	East	1904	1903–1904
Charles Dempster	East	1906	1873–1874; 1894–1907
John Drew	Central	1906	1900–1918; 1924–1947
John Glowrey	South-East	1904	1900–1904; 1906–1912
John Winthrop Hackett	South-West	1906	1890–1916
Samuel Johnson Haynes	South-East	1904	1894–1910
Adam Jameson^{[2]}	Metropolitan-Suburban	1904	1900–1903
Arthur Jenkins	North-East	1904	1898–1904; 1908–1917
Walter Kingsmill^{[2]}	Metropolitan-Suburban	1904	1903–1922
Zebina Lane^{[4]}	Metropolitan-Suburban	1908	1903–1908
Joseph Langsford^{[5]}	Metropolitan-Suburban	1906	1904–1911
Robert Laurie	West	1906	1901–1912
William Loton^{[1]}	East	1908	1889–1890; 1898–1900; 1902–1908
Edward McLarty	South-West	1904	1894–1916
Wesley Maley	South-East	1906	1900–1909
Matthew Moss	West	1908	1900–1901; 1902–1914
Con O'Brien	Central	1904	1901–1904; 1908–1914
Charles Piesse	South-East	1908	1894–1914
George Randell	Metropolitan	1904	1875–1878; 1880–1890; 1893–1894; 1897–1910
John Richardson	North	1904	1894–1904
Sir George Shenton	Metropolitan	1906	1870–1873; 1875–1906
Charles Sommers	North-East	1906	1900–1918
Joseph Thomson	Central	1908	1902–1908
Frank Stone	North	1906	1894–1906
Sir Edward Wittenoom	North	1908	1883–1884; 1885–1886; 1894–1898; 1902–1906; 1910–1934
Barrington Wood^{[4]}	Metropolitan-Suburban	1908	1902–1903
James Wright	Metropolitan	1908	1902–1908

== Notes ==
^{1} On 2 May 1902, East Province MLC Frederick Crowder, who had been elected unopposed one week earlier, died. William Loton was elected unopposed on 17 May 1902.
^{2} On 24 January 1903, Metropolitan-Suburban Province MLC Adam Jameson resigned. Walter Kingsmill, who had resigned as the Assembly member for Pilbara to contest the seat, was elected unopposed on 9 February 1903.
^{3} On 6 April 1903, East Province MLC Richard Burges resigned. Andrew Dempster won the resulting by-election on 6 May 1903.
^{4} On 25 August 1903, Metropolitan-Suburban Province MLC Barrington Wood died. Zebina Lane won the resulting by-election on 11 September 1903.
^{5} On 15 December 1903, Metropolitan-Suburban Province MLC William Brookman's seat was declared vacant on the grounds of absence without leave. Joseph Langsford won the resulting by-election on 5 January 1904.

== Sources ==
- Black, David (1991). Legislative Council of Western Australia : membership register, electoral law and statistics, 1890-1989. Perth: Parliamentary History Project. ISBN 0-7309-3641-4.
- Hughes, Colin A.; Aitkin, Don (1986). Voting for the Australian State Upper Houses, 1890-1984. Canberra: Australian National University. ISBN 0-909779-18-X.
