= Charles Nathan =

Australian politician (1870–1936)

The Honourable Sir Charles Nathan CBE
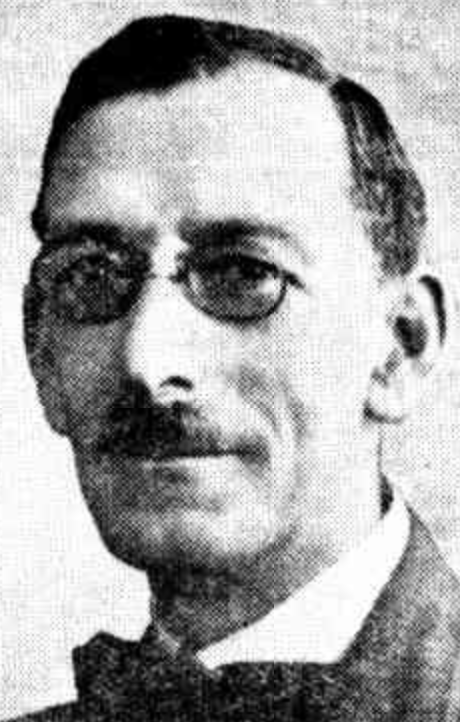

Member of the Legislative Council of Western Australia
- In office 11 January 1930 – 21 May 1934 Serving with William Lathlain (1930–1932); Henry Stephenson (1930); James Macfarlane (1930–1934); Alec Clydesdale (1932–1934)
- Preceded by: Athelstan Saw
- Constituency: Metropolitan-Suburban Province

Personal details
- Born: Charles Samuel Nathan; 23 July 1870 South Melbourne, Colony of Victoria
- Died: 5 June 1936 (aged 65) Perth, Western Australia, Australia
- Party: Nationalist

Sir Charles Samuel Nathan CBE (23 July 1870 – 5 June 1936) was an Australian businessman, politician, and philanthropist. For many years an economic adviser to the Commonwealth government and the state government of Western Australia, he was later elected to the Legislative Council of Western Australia, serving from 1930 to 1934.

== Early life and business career ==
Nathan was born to a Jewish family in South Melbourne, Victoria, with his parents, Flora (née Levy) and Solomon David Nathan, both born in England. The family soon immigrated to New Zealand, and Nathan attended school in Christchurch. He briefly trained as a solicitor, but did not go any further down that path. After a period in Dunedin, Nathan left for Australia, arriving in New South Wales in 1890 before going on to Western Australia four years later. There, he set up as a merchant in the port city of Fremantle. In 1901, Nathan joined Charles Atkin and Co. (later Atkins Pty Ltd), a large South Australia-based manufacturing concern with which he would remain involved until 1927, as business manager (from 1903) and then as managing director (from 1911).

== Public career ==
Nathan first entered public life in 1901, when he was elected as a councillor for the East Fremantle Municipality. He served in that role until 1905, when he unsuccessfully ran for mayor against the incumbent, William Angwin, losing by 59 votes as he polled 46.31 percent of the total. He then went on to serve on the Fremantle Municipal Tramways board for several years. During the First World War, Nathan involved himself in several charitable funds relating to the war effort. After the conclusion of the war, in addition to his personal business activities, he was often invited to fill various positions on state and federal government advisory bodies. In 1921, during his term (from 1920 to 1923) as chairman of the state government's Council of Industrial Development, he led a trade delegation to Malaya and Java. Nathan also conducted trade negotiations for the federal government in the United Kingdom, serving as a commissioner to the British Empire Exhibition in London in 1924. He was involved in the federal Advisory Council of Science and Industry (now CSIRO) from its beginnings in the early 1920s, and served a one-year term on its executive starting in 1927. For his services, Nathan was appointed a CBE in 1926 and created a Knight Bachelor in the 1928 New Year Honours.

== Parliament and later life ==
Following the death of Athelstan Saw in November 1929, Nathan was endorsed as one of three Nationalist Party candidates at the resulting by-election for the Legislative Council's Metropolitan-Suburban Province. There was also one "independent Labor" candidate. His campaign was strongly endorsed by the Mirror, a now-defunct Perth newspaper, which branded him "the man who gave something for nothing". He went on to poll 34.38% on first preferences, and was eventually elected with 52.57% of the two-candidate-preferred vote. In 1931, following the resignation of Sir Norbert Keenan from Cabinet, Nathan was regarded as a contender to replace him in the ministry, though this did not eventuate. Completing the remainder of Saw's six-year term, he announced his retirement from the Legislative Council in December 1933, and was replaced at the 1934 election by another Nationalist candidate, Hubert Parker. Nathan died in Perth in 1936, having suffered from cerebrovascular disease for several years. He had married Mary Bessie Lichtenstein in 1898, with whom he had a daughter (who predeceased him) and two sons.
