= Zebina Lane =

Australian politician

Zebina Bartholomew Lane MLC
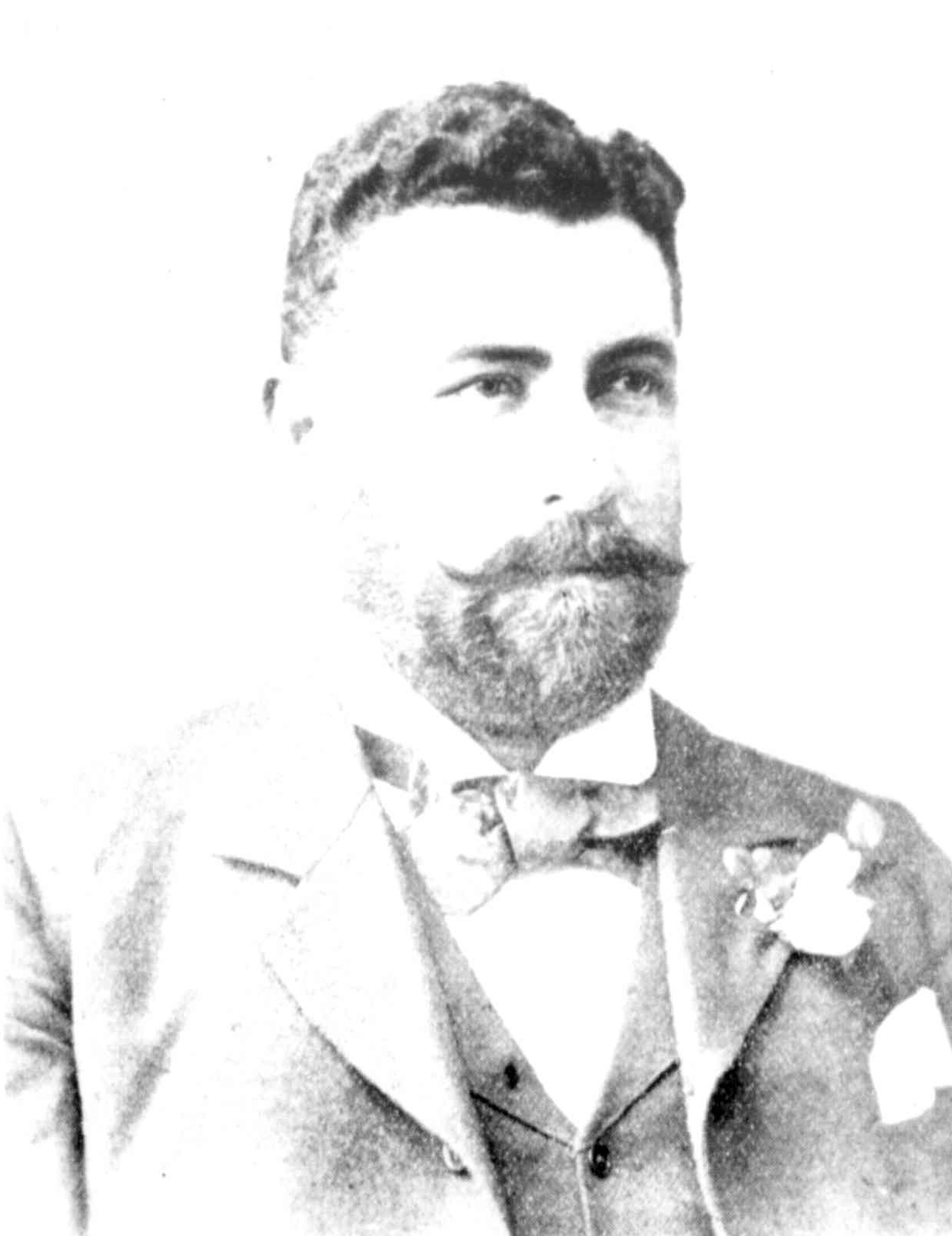

Member of the Western Australian Legislative Council
- In office 11 September 1903 – 21 May 1908 Serving with William Brookman, Walter Kingsmill, Joseph Langsford
- Constituency: Metropolitan-Suburban Province

Personal details
- Born: 27 January 1856 Moliagul, Victoria, British Empire
- Died: 20 October 1912 (aged 56) Berlin, Germany
- Party: None
- Spouse: Euphemia Leslie
- Children: Two sons and one daughter

Zebina Bartholomew Lane (1856–1912) was an Australian mining engineer and politician who was a member of the Western Australian Legislative Council for the Metropolitan-Suburban Province from 11 September 1903 to 21 May 1908. He was also mayor of Broken Hill in New South Wales from 11 February 1889 to 12 February 1890, and was the manager of several mines across New South Wales, Victoria and Western Australia.

== Early life ==
Lane was born at Moliagul, near Bendigo, Victoria, on 27 January 1856. His parents were Canadian-born mining engineer Zebina Lane and Irish-born Mary Kearney.

== Career ==
At age 15, he managed a mine at St Arnaud, Victoria, later joining the Colonial Smelting Co. He moved to New Zealand, living there for eight years and working at the Hauraki goldfields. He also visited California in the United States, and lived in Ballarat, Victoria, in 1878.

In 1885, Lane moved to Broken Hill, New South Wales, to manage several mines. His methods of management were tough, and caused friction between him and his workers. An effigy of Lane was hanged and burned in July 1892 during a workers strike. He obstructed an inquiry into lead poisoning despite his daughter having died of it as a baby in 1890.

Lane was an active member of the Mine Managers' Association. In 1888, Lane was elected to the first ever Broken Hill Municipal Council. In February 1889, he became mayor of Broken Hill. He did not stand for re-election, and so was succeeded as mayor by Thomas Coombe (father of Thomas Coombe) on 12 February 1890.

In November 1893, Lane visited Coolgardie, Western Australia. He floated nearby mining companies in mid-1894 in London. He worked at the Great Boulder as a consultant engineer and attorney until 1899. In 1895, a syndicate he formed floated the Great Boulder Perseverance mine. After that, he invested in jarrah timber and urban development, floating the Collie Proprietary Coalfields Co.

In January 1902, he moved to Perth, Western Australia. He was elected to the Metropolitan-Suburban Province of the Western Australian Legislative Council at a by-election on 11 September 1903. He succeeded Barrington Wood, who had died on 24 August 1903. He had strong participation in debates at first, but was quiet after criticism from the 1904 royal commission into the Great Boulder Perseverance mine. Lane retired on 21 May 1908, and was replaced by Sydney Stubbs.

== Personal life ==
Lane married Euphemia Leslie on 12 February 1878 at Sandhurst, Victoria. He had two sons and one daughter. His daughter died of lead poisoning as a baby in 1890.

== Death and legacy ==
In 1910, Lane had abdominal surgery in London to have a silver plate placed into him. He died on 20 October 1912 in Berlin, Germany, during surgery to fix his plate.

Zebina Street and Lane Street in Broken Hill are named after Lane. So too is Zebina Street in East Perth (an area which he developed), and Lane Street in Perth, Kalgoorlie and Boulder.
