= Garnet Wood =

Australian politician

The Honourable Garnet Wood

Member of the Legislative Council of Western Australia
- In office 22 May 1936 – 22 May 1950
- Preceded by: Herbert Yelland
- Succeeded by: None (abolished)
- Constituency: East Province
- In office 22 May 1950 – 3 January 1952
- Preceded by: None (new seat)
- Succeeded by: Leslie Diver
- Constituency: Central Province

Personal details
- Born: 1 July 1888 Fremantle, Western Australia, Australia
- Died: 3 January 1952 (aged 63) Perth, Western Australia, Australia
- Party: Country

Garnet Barrington Wood (1 July 1888 – 3 January 1952) was an Australian politician who served as a Country Party member of the Legislative Council of Western Australia from 1936 until his death. He was a minister in the government of Ross McLarty.

== Early life ==
Wood was born in Fremantle, Western Australia, to Mary Louisa (née Whitfield) and Barrington Clarke Wood. His father, who died when he was 15, was also a member of parliament and government minister. Wood attended Hale School, Perth, and after graduating worked for a period as an accountant for Western Australian Government Railways. He moved to MarribankCarrolup (in the Great Southern) in 1912, and later farmed at Narrogin and York. Wood was elected to the York Road Board in 1932, and would serve until 1951.

== Politics and later life ==
Prominent in agricultural circles, Wood was elected to the Legislative Council at the 1936 election, defeating Herbert Yelland in East Province. He was re-elected in 1944, and in January 1948 was made an honorary minister in the ministry of Ross McLarty, with responsibility for agriculture and the North-West. Wood's constituency was abolished at the 1950 election, and he successfully transferred to Central Province. Later in the year, in October 1950, he was given a substantive position in the ministry, becoming Minister for Agriculture.

Wood died in office in January 1952, while attending a cabinet meeting in Perth, and was granted a state funeral. He had married twice, to Gillian Richardson in 1917 and to Eveline Parker in 1925, having two daughters by each marriage. His first wife was the daughter of Alexander Richardson, who was also an MP.

== See also ==
- Members of the Western Australian Legislative Council

Parliament of Western Australia
Political offices
Preceded by Lindsay Thorn	Minister for Agriculture; 1948–1952	Succeeded by Sir Arthur Griffith
