= Barrington Wood =

Australian politician

The Honourable Barrington Wood
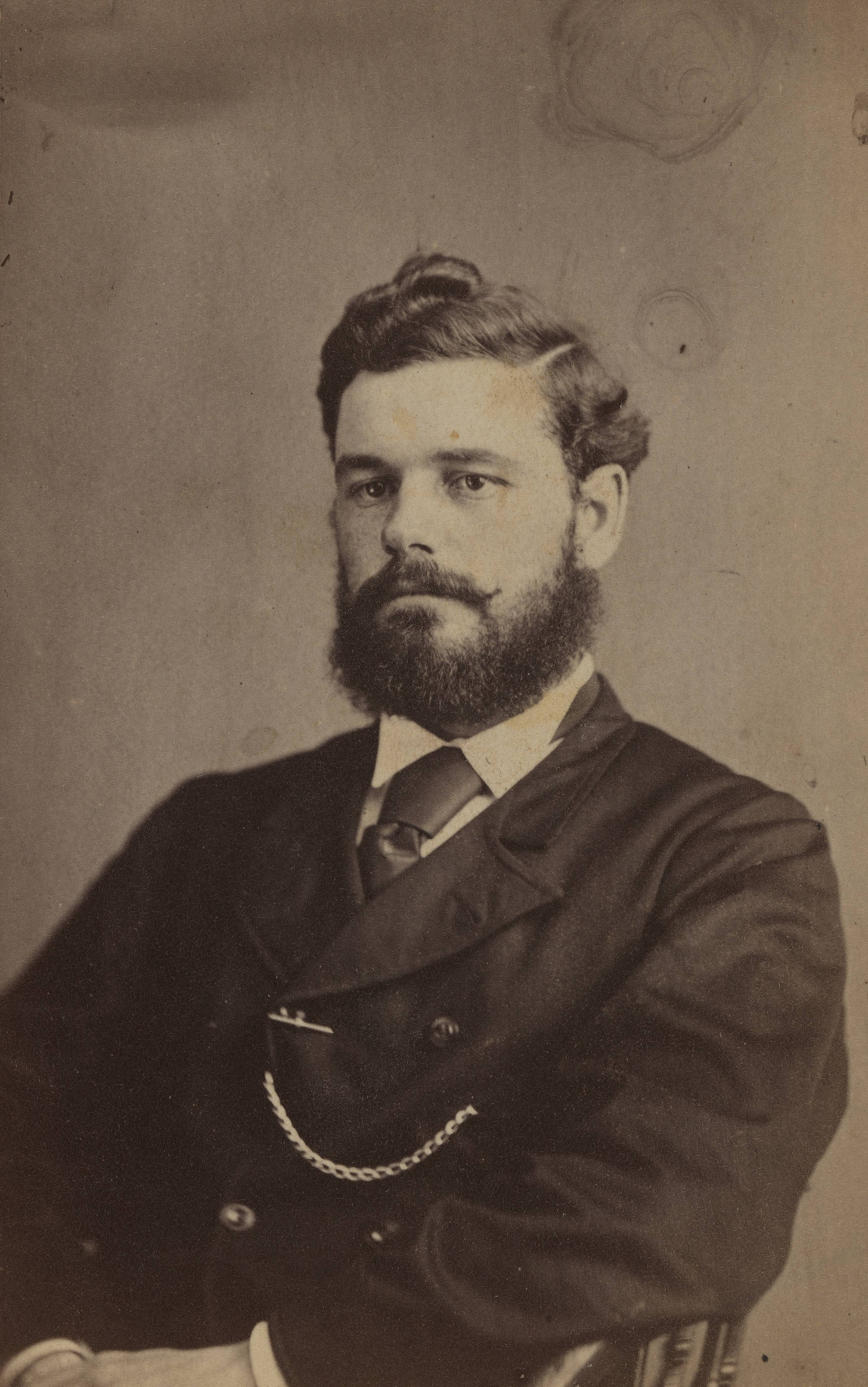
- c. 1880

Member of the Legislative Assembly of Western Australia
- In office 14 June 1894 – 24 April 1901
- Preceded by: Timothy Quinlan
- Succeeded by: George Leake
- Constituency: West Perth

Member of the Legislative Council of Western Australia
- In office 12 May 1902 – 24 August 1903
- Preceded by: James Speed
- Succeeded by: Zebina Lane
- Constituency: Metropolitan-Suburban Province

Personal details
- Born: 9 May 1850 Fremantle, Western Australia, Australia
- Died: 24 August 1903 (aged 53) Mandurah, Western Australia, Australia

Barrington Clarke Wood (9 May 1850 – 24 August 1903) was an Australian businessman and politician who served in both houses of the Parliament of Western Australia. A minister in the governments of Sir John Forrest and George Throssell, he was a member of the Legislative Assembly from 1894 to 1901, and then a member of the Legislative Council from 1902 until his death.

Wood was born in Fremantle, Western Australia, to Ellen (née Woodward) and George Wood. His father died when he was young, and his mother remarried in 1863 to Edward Newman, who was later elected to the Legislative Council. A merchant, Wood was elected to the Fremantle Town Council in 1875, and later served as Mayor of Fremantle from 1883 to 1885. In 1888, he moved to Perth, establishing his own auctioneering and land agency business. He was elected to parliament at the 1894 general election, defeating the sitting member, Timothy Quinlan, and a future MP, Richard Haynes, in the seat of West Perth. Wood was re-elected at the 1897 election, and in 1900 replaced Frederick Piesse as Commissioner for Railways and Director of Public Works in the government of Sir John Forrest. He continued on in those positions when George Throssell became premier in February 1901.

At the 1901 general election, Wood was defeated in West Perth by George Leake, who succeeded George Throssell as premier just over a month later. He attempted to re-enter parliament at the 1901 West Kimberley by-election, but lost to Sydney Pigott. In 1902, Wood was elected to the Legislative Council, defeating James Speed in Metropolitan-Suburban Province. He served until his sudden death in August 1903, which occurred while on a holiday to Mandurah. He had been walking back to his lodgings from a day at the beach when he collapsed on the roadside (presumably due to heart failure), and his body was not found until the following morning. Wood had married Mary Louisa Whitfield in 1879, with whom he had four children. One of his sons, Garnet Wood, was also a member of parliament, and also died in office.

== See also ==
- List of mayors of Fremantle

Parliament of Western Australia
Preceded by Timothy Quinlan	Member for West Perth; 1894–1901	Succeeded by George Leake
Political offices
Preceded by Frederick Piesse	Commissioner for Railways; 1900–1901	Succeeded by Joseph Holmes
Preceded by Frederick Piesse	Director of Public Works; 1900–1901	Succeeded by Walter Kingsmill
