= Joseph Duffell =

Australian politician

Joseph Duffell MLC

Member of the Western Australian Legislative Council
- In office 22 May 1914 – 21 May 1926 Serving with Harry Boan, Archibald Sanderson, Athelstan Saw, Henry Stephenson
- Constituency: Metropolitan-Suburban Province

Personal details
- Born: c. 1862 England, United Kingdom
- Died: 28 February 1936 St John of God Hospital, Subiaco, Western Australia
- Party: Liberal (1914–1917); National (1917–1926)
- Spouse: Mary Jane Tandy
- Children: Two sons and one daughter

Joseph Duffell was an Australian politician who was a member of the Western Australian Legislative Council for the Metropolitan-Suburban Province from 22 May 1914 to 21 May 1926. He was a member of the Liberal Party up until 1917, when he became a member of the National Party.

He was born in England c. 1862 to John, a saddler and moulder, and Eliza. He married Mary Jane Tandy (c. 1863 – 6 January 1919) on 25 December 1883 at the North Harborne Parish Church in England. They had two sons and one daughter.

The Duffells arrived in Western Australia in 1905, where he founded a firm of cork importers and vinegar manufacturers.

In November 1906, Duffell was elected to the Subiaco Municipal Council. He was sworn in on 4 December 1906. In November 1912, he was elected as mayor of Subiaco, serving in that role until 1915.

At the 1914 Western Australian Legislative Council election, Duffell was elected to the Metropolitan-Suburban Province. His term started on 22 May 1914. At first, he was part of the Liberal Party, but he became part of the National Party in 1917 when the Liberal Party merged into it. At the 1926 Western Australian Legislative Council election, Duffell was voted out.

Duffell died on 28 February 1936 at St John of God Subiaco Hospital. He was buried in Karrakatta Cemetery.
