= Douglas Gawler =

Australian lawyer and politician (1860–1915)

The Honourable Douglas Gawler

Member of the Legislative Council of Western Australia
- In office 23 March 1910 – 6 May 1915
- Preceded by: Walter Kingsmill
- Succeeded by: Athelstan Saw
- Constituency: Metropolitan-Suburban Province

Personal details
- Born: 9 November 1860 Adelaide, Colony of South Australia
- Died: 6 May 1915 (aged 54) Peppermint Grove, Western Australia, Australia
- Parent: Henry Gawler (father)
- Relatives: George Gawler grandfather
- Education: University of Adelaide

Douglas George Gawler (9 November 1860 – 6 May 1915) was an Australian lawyer and politician who was a member of the Legislative Council of Western Australia from 1910 until his death, representing Metropolitan-Suburban Province.

Gawler was born in Adelaide, South Australia, to Caroline (née Philpot) and Henry Gawler. His grandfather, George Gawler, was the second Governor of South Australia. Gawler attended St Peter's College, Adelaide, and then studied law at the University of Adelaide. Gawler was called to the bar in South Australia in 1886, and left for Western Australia later that year, establishing his own firm in Perth. At one time, he was in partnership with Robert Bruce Burnside, a future Supreme Court justice. Having previously served on the Peppermint Grove Road Board for a period, Gawler was elected to parliament at a 1910 Legislative Council by-election, which had been caused by the resignation of Walter Kingsmill. He died in office in May 1915 (aged 54), of typhoid fever. He had married Eva Mary Waldeck in 1893, with whom he had four children.
