= James Gordon Hislop =

Australian doctor and politician

The Honourable James Hislop FRCP FRACP

Member of the Legislative Council of Western Australia
- In office 1 November 1941 – 21 May 1971
- Preceded by: John Nicholson
- Succeeded by: John Williams
- Constituency: Metropolitan Province

Personal details
- Born: 14 August 1895 Windsor, Victoria, Australia
- Died: 4 May 1972 (aged 76) Perth, Western Australia, Australia
- Party: Nationalist (to 1945); Liberal (from 1945)
- Education: University of Melbourne

James Gordon Hislop (14 August 1895 – 4 May 1972) was an Australian medical doctor and politician who was a member of the Legislative Council of Western Australia from 1941 to 1971, representing Metropolitan Province. Before entering politics he was better known as a hospital administrator.

== Early life and medical career ==
Hislop was born in Melbourne to Katherine (née Collins) and James Hislop, his father being an immigrant from Scotland. He attended Scotch College before going on to study medicine the University of Melbourne, where he graduated in 1918. After brief periods working in Victoria, Tasmania, and Western Australia, Hislop left for England in 1920 to undertake postgraduate study. He spent at the Manchester Royal Infirmary and the Brompton Hospital in London, and developed an interest in chest disease which he maintained for the rest of his professional career. Hislop returned to Melbourne in 1923, working at Melbourne Hospital, but the following year left for Perth, where he was made superintendent of the Perth Children's Hospital. He entered private practice in 1927.

== Politics and later life ==
A member of the Nationalist Party, Hislop entered parliament at a 1941 Legislative Council by-election, caused by the death of John Nicholson. He joined the new Liberal Party upon its formation in 1945. During his time in parliament, Hislop often contributed to debates on health issues. He was also involved in the establishment of a medical school at the University of Western Australia (the first in the state), and also made several unsuccessful attempts to liberalise Western Australia's abortion laws. Hislop retired at the 1971 state election, after almost 30 years as a member of the Legislative Council, and died in Perth the following year, aged 76. He had married Netta Millicent Searll in 1925, with whom he had two children.

== See also ==
- Members of the Western Australian Legislative Council
