= James Speed (Australian politician) =

Australian politician

James Speed MLC
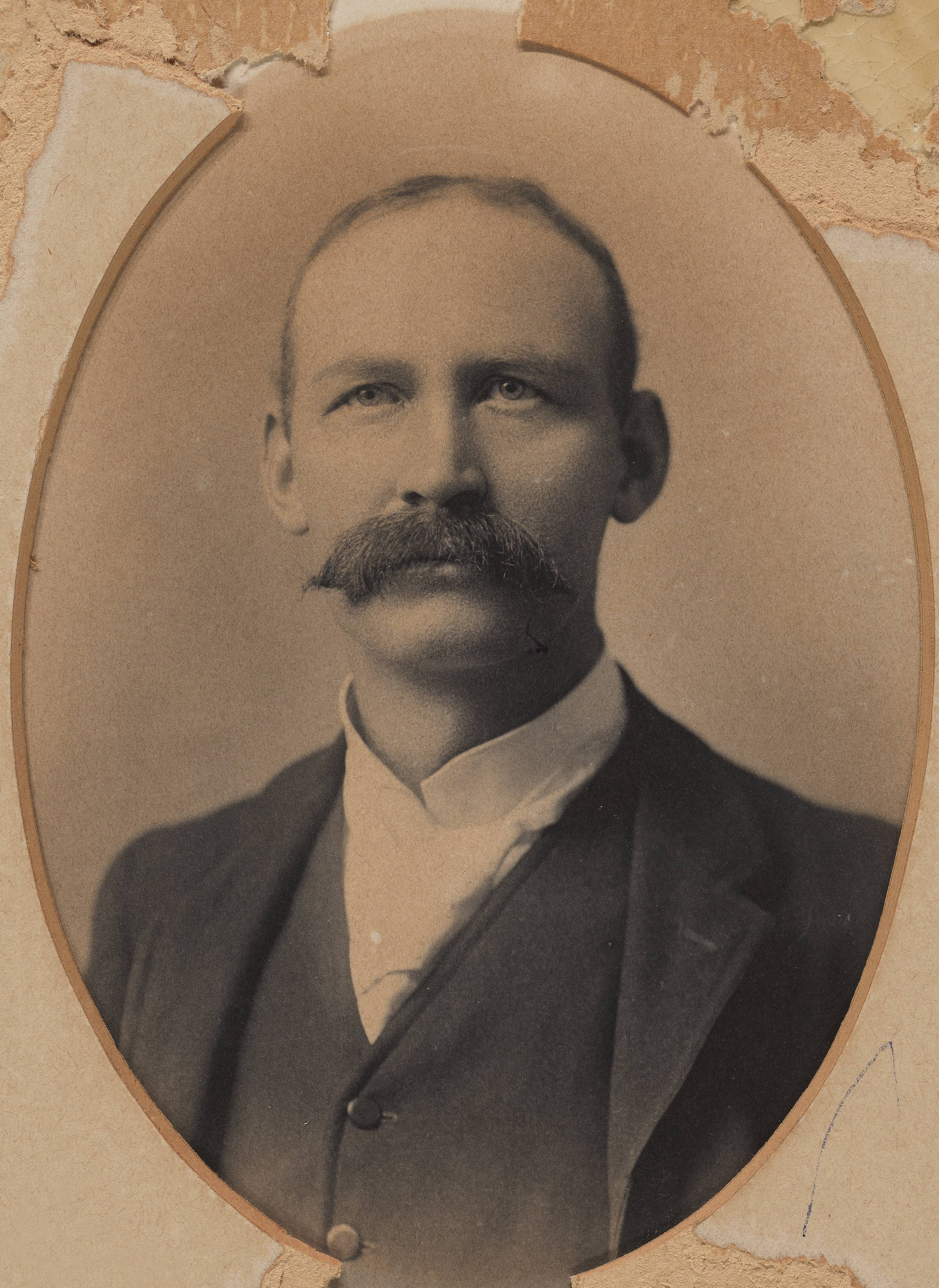
- Speed c. 1897

Member of the Western Australian Legislative Council
- In office 29 August 1900 – 21 May 1902 Serving with William Brookman, Adam Jameson
- Constituency: Metropolitan-Suburban Province

Personal details
- Born: 10 August 1856 Wanganui, Wellington Province, New Zealand
- Died: 9 July 1925 (aged 68) Paris, France
- Resting place: Karrakatta Cemetery
- Occupation: Lawyer

James Montgomery Speed was a politician who was a member of the Western Australian Legislative Council (upper house) for the Metropolitan-Suburban Province from 29 August 1900 to 21 May 1902. He was not elected as a member of any political party, but was a delegate from the Parliamentary Labor Party to the August 1901 Labor Congress. He was also a cricketer, and played in four first-class matches for Wellington from 1877 to 1880.

== Life in New Zealand ==
Speed was born on 10 August 1856 in Wanganui, Wellington Province, New Zealand. His parents were James, a licensed publican, and Janet Montgomery. He was educated at Nelson College and the University of New Zealand. Following that, he worked as a lawyer in Wellington and Auckland.

Speed played in four first-class matches for Wellington from 1877 to 1880.

== Life in Perth ==
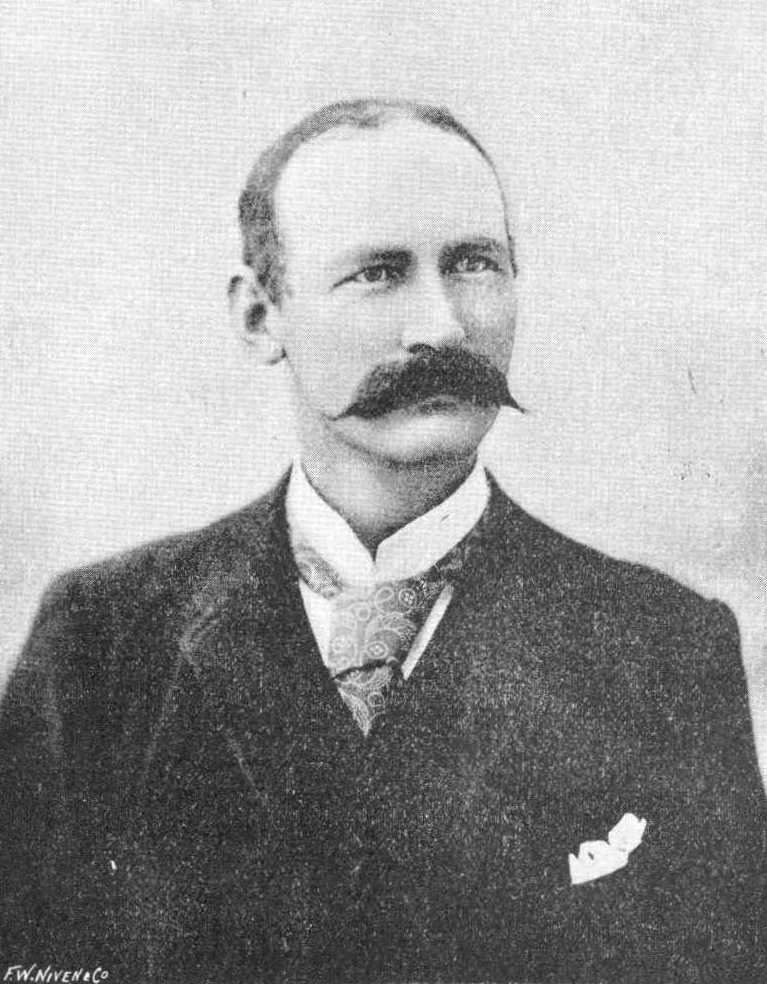
Speed c. 1897

In 1892, Speed moved to Perth, Western Australia. He married Louisa Katherine Carey (née Hester, born c. January 1856) on 25 March 1894 at St John's Church, Perth. She died on 15 November 1894. On 14 February 1895, Speed married Georgina Henrietta Spencer (born c. March 1872) at a private residence at Wilberforce, near York, Western Australia. No children resulted from either marriage.

From June 1897 to November 1900, Speed was on the Perth City Council.

At the September 1900 Western Australian Legislative Council election, Speed was elected as one of three inaugural members of the Metropolitan-Suburban Province, alongside William Brookman and Adam Jameson. His term started on 29 August 1900. Upon election, he was not a member of any political party, but was a delegate from the Parliamentary Labor Party to the August 1901 Labor Congress. As it is not known when he joined the Labor Party, he is possibly the first Labor Party member of the Parliament of Western Australia. He did not win re-election at the 1902 Western Australian Legislative Council election, with his term running out on 21 May 1902. He unsuccessfully stood for the electoral district of West Perth in the Western Australian Legislative Assembly at the 1905 Western Australian state election on 27 October 1905.

== Later life ==
In around 1910, shortly after he received a sizeable inheritance from New Zealand, Speed left his wife Georgina and took up residence with Barbara Bridget Hayes. This resulted in Georgina divorcing him in 1913. He and Hayes moved to New Zealand in the wake of the divorce and he married her there in 1914. He died in Paris, on 9 July 1925 as the result of a car accident. His body was embalmed and returned to Perth, where it was buried at Karrakatta Cemetery.
