= Boan =

Boan may refer to:

== People ==
- Boan Venter (born 1997), South African rugby player
- Christophe Boan, French curler
- Harry Boan (1860–1941), Australian businessman and politician, founder of Boans
- Pierre Boan (1925–2011), French curler

== Other uses ==
- Boan languages, a proposed group of Bantu languages
- Boan, Montenegro, a village in Šavnik

== See also ==
- Boann, Irish goddess
- Boans, a defunct Australian department store chain
