= Leslie Diver =

Australian politician

The Honourable Sir Leslie Diver

11th President of the Legislative Council of Western Australia
- In office 28 July 1960 – 21 May 1974
- Preceded by: Sir Charles Latham
- Succeeded by: Sir Arthur Griffith

Member of the Legislative Council of Western Australia
- In office 3 May 1952 – 21 May 1974
- Preceded by: Garnet Wood
- Succeeded by: Harry Gayfer
- Constituency: Central Province

Personal details
- Born: 4 November 1899 Perth, Western Australia, Australia
- Died: 4 August 1995 (aged 95) Kellerberrin, Western Australia, Australia
- Party: Country

Sir Leslie Charles Diver (4 November 1899 – 4 August 1995) was an Australian politician who served as a Country Party member of the Legislative Council of Western Australia from 1952 to 1974. He was President of the Legislative Council from 1960 to 1974. Only Clive Griffiths and Sir John Kirwan have served in the position longer.

== Early life ==
Diver was born in Perth to Charlotte Ella (née Pearce) and Joseph William Diver. Leaving school at an early age, he worked for a period as a farm labourer and contractor before buying his own farm at Yorkrakine (a small Wheatbelt town) in 1924. Diver was elected to the Kellerberrin Road Board in 1933, and served until 1946. He was chairman in 1940, and again from 1942 to 1946.

== Politics ==
A long-time member of the Country Party, Diver first stood for parliament at the 1950 Legislative Council election, but was defeated by Norm Baxter in his candidacy for Central Province. He eventually entered parliament in May 1952, after winning the by-election caused by the death of Garnet Wood. Following the retirement of Sir Charles Latham in 1960, Diver was elected President of the Legislative Council. He served in the position for almost 14 years (a term length surpassed by only Clive Griffiths and Sir John Kirwan), finally retiring from politics in 1974.

== Later life ==
Diver was knighted for his service in June 1975, on the recommendation on the government of Sir Charles Court. He died in Kellerberrin in August 1995, aged 95. At the time of his death, he was the oldest-lived MP in Western Australia's history, although several others have since died at greater ages.

Parliament of Western Australia
Western Australian Legislative Council
Preceded by Garnet Wood	Member for Central Province; 1952-1974	Succeeded by Harry Gayfer
Preceded by Sir Charles Latham	President of the Western Australian Legislative Council; 1960–1974	Succeeded by Sir Arthur Griffith
