= Harold George Parsons =

English-born Australian lawyer, mayor, politician and colonial administrator

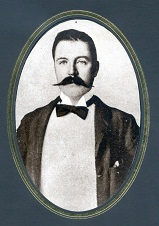

Member of the Western Australian Legislative Council
- In office 29 June 1897 – 1900
- Preceded by: New seat
- Succeeded by: Charles Sommers
- Constituency: North-East Province

Mayor of Kalgoorlie
- In office 1896–1897
- Preceded by: John Wilson
- Succeeded by: Robert Donald McKenzie

Personal details
- Born: 8 March 1867 Kent, England
- Died: August 1905 (aged 38) Lagos, Southern Nigeria
- Party: Independent
- Education: Wadham College, Oxford
- Occupation: Lawyer, journalist, soldier, and mining investor

Harold George Parsons (8 March 1867 – 27 August 1905) was an English-born Australian lawyer, journalist, soldier, mining investor, and politician. He served as Mayor of Kalgoorlie (1896–1897) and as a member of the Western Australian Legislative Council for the North-East Province (1897–1900).

== History ==
Parsons was born on 8 March 1867 in Kent, England and was educated at the Church of England Grammar School, winning a scholarship to Wadham College, Oxford, where he won a senior scholarship in 1887. In 1891 and 1892 he worked for W. E. Henley's The Scotsman as chief leader writer. In 1893 he was called to the bar, Inner Temple, and emigrated to Western Australia, where he was one of the first solicitors practising on the goldfields. After some hardships he became quite wealthy as a result of speculations, and in 1897 was elected as a member of the Legislative Council. He was elected mayor of Kalgoorlie (1896–1897), and was the founder and first vice-president of the Kalgoorlie Chamber of Mines. He married in London, to a wealthy widow, but she died within a year, leaving him nothing. He obtained a commission and served in South Africa as lieutenant of the 53rd East Kent Imperial Yeomanry. He was wounded and later decorated. He organised a detachment of troops for the coronation in 1902, and in 1903 applied for an Imperial posting and was appointed District Commissioner and acting Police Magistrate in Lagos, where he died of heart failure, attributed to fatigue and overwork.

== Other interests ==
Parsons was a frequent contributor to literary magazines such as Blackwood and Fortnightly Review. He was a close friend, from Oxford days, of Theodore Andrea Cook, private secretary to Joseph Pulitzer.

== Family ==
In May 1896 in London he married Mrs Snell, née Elizabeth Annie De Vaux, widow of Walter Thomas Snell, well known as an hotelier on the goldfields, and possessor of a considerable fortune. Her children included

- Cyril Louis Snell (1884–1937), gold miner; killed when excavation collapsed.
- On 20 April 1899 her daughter Florance Snell married John Stroud Read, a Perth stockbroker, who in May 1909 killed himself rather than face the Bankruptcy Court.
- On 3 September 1895 her daughter Katherine De Vaus Snell married stockbroker Charles Augustus Saw, also referred to as Charles Augustus Saw (died 1941). They divorced in 1919.
