= President of the Western Australian Legislative Council =

- Incumbent; Alanna Clohesy since 25 May 2021
- Style: The Honourable; Mr / Madam President (in the Council)
- Appointer: The Monarch's representative at the behest of the Legislative Council
- Term length: Elected at start of each Parliament
- Inaugural holder: Sir Thomas Cockburn-Campbell
- Formation: 29 December 1890
- Website: www.parliament.wa.gov.au

The President of the Western Australian Legislative Council, also known as the Presiding Officer of the Council, is the presiding officer of the Western Australian Legislative Council, the upper house of the Parliament of Western Australia. The position is analogous to that of the President of the Australian Senate.

== The role of the president ==
The President is always a Member of the Western Australian Legislative Council, and is the ceremonial head of that Council. The President therefore performs ceremonial duties, and represents the Council to other organisations. In conjunction with the Speaker of the Western Australian Legislative Assembly, the President is responsible for the administration of the Western Australian Parliament. When the Council is sitting, the President enforces procedures, maintains order, puts questions after debate and ensures each member of the chamber gets a fair opportunity to speak to matters under debate. The President also makes decisions and formal rulings with regards to the chamber's standing orders.

== Election of the president ==
The President of the Legislative Council is elected by the other members of the Council in accordance with Section 49 of the Constitution Act 1889. They must be elected after each general election or upon the death, resignation or removal of a previous President, and can be brought down by a vote of the chamber's members (although this has never happened in Western Australia), so must maintain the confidence of the chamber.

== List of presidents of the Legislative Council ==
Note: where no political party is listed, this means that either the party is unknown, or that the President in question was not affiliated with any particular party. Multiple parties are listed in cases where the President represented more than one party over their career as a Member of the Legislative Council.

Order	President	Party (if applicable)	Term begin	Term end	Term in office	Notes
1	Sir Thomas Cockburn-Campbell	N/A	29 December 1890	27 September 1892	1 year, 273 days	
2	Sir George Shenton	N/A	11 October 1892	21 May 1906	13 years, 222 days	
3	Sir Henry Briggs	Independent	21 June 1906	8 June 1919	12 years, 352 days	
4	Sir Walter Kingsmill	Independent	31 July 1919	21 May 1922	2 years, 294 days	
5	Sir Edward Wittenoom	Nationalist	27 July 1922	9 August 1926	4 years, 43 days	
6	Sir John Kirwan	Independent	10 August 1926	21 May 1946	19 years, 284 days	
7	James Cornell	Liberal	25 July 1946	25 November 1946	123 days	
8	Sir Harold Seddon	Liberal	26 November 1946	21 May 1954	7 years, 176 days	
9	Anthony Loton	Country	14 June 1954	6 August 1958	4 years, 53 days	
10	Sir Charles Latham	Country	7 August 1958	21 May 1960	1 year, 288 days	
11	Sir Leslie Diver	Country	28 July 1960	21 May 1974	13 years, 297 days	
12	Sir Arthur Griffith	Liberal	22 May 1974	21 May 1977	2 years, 364 days	
13	Clive Edward Griffiths	Liberal	24 May 1977	21 May 1997	19 years, 362 days	
14	George Cash	Liberal	27 May 1997	21 May 2001	3 years, 359 days	
15	John Cowdell	Labor	22 May 2001	21 May 2005	3 years, 364 days	
16	Nick Griffiths	Labor	24 May 2005	21 May 2009	3 years, 362 days	
17	Barry House	Liberal	22 May 2009	21 May 2017	7 years, 364 days	
18	Kate Doust	Labor	23 May 2017	21 May 2021	3 years, 363 days	
19	Alanna Clohesy	Labor	25 May 2021	present	5 years, 105 days	

== See also ==
- Speaker of the Western Australian Legislative Assembly
