= Henry Gawler (lawyer) =

Australian lawyer

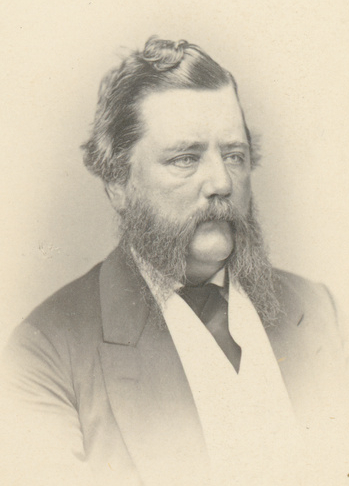
- Henry Gawler Approximately 1860
- Born: 12 August 1827; Quarndon, Derbyshire, England
- Died: 1 December 1894 (aged 67); Mount Lofty, South Australia
- Burial place: West Terrace Cemetery, Adelaide
- Occupation: Lawyer
- Known for: Introduction of Torrens Title
- Spouse: Caroline Augusta Philpot (m. 1857)
- Father: George Gawler

Henry Gawler (1827–1894) was the eldest surviving son of George Gawler. He first travelled to South Australia with his parents and siblings in the Pestonjee Bomanjee, arriving on 12 October 1838 when his father took over the role of Governor of South Australia. They returned to England in 1841.

Henry Gawler was admitted to the bar in England in November 1852. He returned to South Australia in 1858 and worked as a solicitor in the Lands Titles Office from July 1858 to September 1884. During that time he spent two short periods as Attorney-General of South Australia. He assisted Robert Torrens in drafting and amending the Real Property Act 1858 and in the early operation if the Torrens Title system.

Gawler was never an elected member of parliament, but he twice served a few days as Attorney-General of South Australia, 8–17 October 1861 and 23–25 March 1876. He visited New Zealand in 1870 to assist the government there to adopt the Torrens Title system.

Gawler married Caroline Augusta Philpot, daughter of Rev. Benjamin Philpot (later the Archdeacon of Man) on 25 June 1857. One of their sons, Douglas Gawler moved to Perth, Western Australia and established a law firm there and was later elected to the Western Australian Legislative Council.

Political offices
Preceded by Randolph Isham Stow	Attorney-General of South Australia; 1861, 1876	Succeeded by Randolph Isham Stow
Preceded by Samuel Way	Attorney-General of South Australia; 1861, 1876	Succeeded by Charles Mann
