= Charles Sommers =

Australian businessman and politician

The Honourable Charles Sommers

Member of the Legislative Council of Western Australia
- In office 14 May 1900 – 21 May 1906
- Preceded by: Harold George Parsons
- Succeeded by: Thomas Brimage
- Constituency: North-East Province
- In office 22 May 1906 – 21 May 1918
- Preceded by: Sir George Shenton
- Succeeded by: Henry Saunders
- Constituency: Metropolitan Province

Personal details
- Born: 20 January 1862 Geelong, Victoria, Australia
- Died: 19 March 1922 (aged 60) Cottesloe, Western Australia, Australia

Charles Sommers (20 January 1862 – 19 March 1922) was an Australian businessman and politician who was a member of the Legislative Council of Western Australia from 1900 to 1918. He was a minister in the first government of George Leake.

Sommers was born in Geelong, Victoria, and attended Geelong Grammar School. After a period farming at Bendigo, he went to Morwell (in the Gippsland region). Sommers was elected to the Traralgon Shire Council in 1883, aged only 21. He returned to Geelong in 1886, and was elected to the Geelong Municipal Council, serving until 1894. The following year, Sommers left for Western Australia and settled in Coolgardie, where he had interests in various mines and was the managing director of a hotel that had previously been owned by his brother. He was elected mayor of the Coolgardie Municipality in 1899, and would serve until 1903.

Sommers was elected to parliament at the 1900 Legislative Council elections, replacing Harold Parsons (a former mayor of Kalgoorlie) in North-East Province. In May 1901, following the 1901 state election, Sommers was appointed Minister for Lands in the new ministry formed by George Leake. He served only until November of the same year, when Leake was replaced as premier by Alf Morgans. At the 1906 Legislative Council elections, Sommers transferred to Metropolitan Province, succeeding the retiring Sir George Shenton. He was re-elected in 1912, but in 1918 was defeated by Henry Saunders. Sommers died in Perth in 1922, aged 60. He had married Agnes Donaldson in 1886, with whom he had four children.

Parliament of Western Australia
Political offices
Preceded by Charles Moran	Minister for Lands; 1901	Succeeded by John Nanson
