= Joshua Mills (Australian politician) =

Australian politician

Member of the Legislative Council of Western Australia
- In office 22 May 1918 – 21 May 1924 Serving with Henry Carson (1918–1920); James Hickey (1918–1924); Thomas Moore (1920–1924)
- Preceded by: John Drew
- Succeeded by: John Drew
- Constituency: Central Province

Personal details
- Born: 13 January 1859 Narra Tarra, Colony of Western Australia
- Died: March 21, 1943 (aged 84) Geraldton, Western Australia
- Party: Ind. Nationalist (1918–1923); MCP (1923–1924); Nationalist (from 1924)

Joshua "Joe" Mills (13 January 1859 – 21 March 1943) was an Australian politician who was a member of the Legislative Council of Western Australia from 1918 to 1924. Prominent in the state's Murchison and Mid West regions, he served a single six-year term in parliament.

Mills was born at Narra Tarra, a locality on the Chapman River, near Geraldton. Before standing for parliament, he worked variously as an inspector of stock, a sheep farmer (at Narra Tarra), a station manager (at Wurarga, Barnong, and Gabyon), and an Agricultural Bank inspector. Mills stood as an "independent Nationalist" candidate for Central Province at the 1918 Legislative Council elections. He defeated Labor's John Drew, who had become personally unpopular in the seat. Mills' age (he was 59 when he first stood for office) led to him being nicknamed "Uncle Joe" by The Sunday Times. After briefly joining the Ministerial Country Party in 1923 (a Country Party splinter group), Mills stood as an endorsed Nationalist candidate at the 1924 election, but was defeated by Drew. He stood again in 1926, but was defeated by Country candidate George Kempton.

After losing his seat, Mills farmed with his son at Waggrakine. He had married Hannah Maley in 1892, and the couple had one son and one daughter together, but she died in childbirth in 1905. Her brothers, Charles and Henry Maley, were both later members of the Legislative Assembly (for Irwin and Greenough, respectively). Mills' own sister, Harriet Mills, was married to Everard Darlot, who was the inaugural MLA for Murchison. He was consequently the brother-in-law of three other MPs in Western Australia. Mills died in Geraldton in 1943, aged 84, and was buried at Narra Tarra.
