= Thomas Brimage =

Australian businessman and politician

The Honourable Thomas Brimage
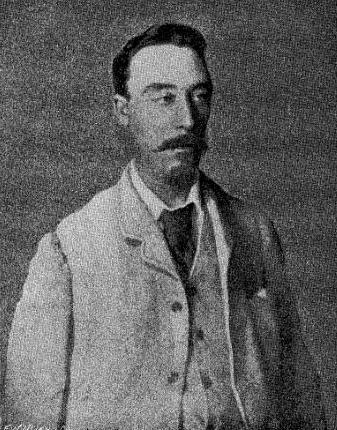

Member of the Legislative Council of Western Australia
- In office 5 September 1900 – 21 May 1906
- Preceded by: None (new seat)
- Succeeded by: John Glowrey
- Constituency: South Province
- In office 22 May 1906 – 21 May 1912
- Preceded by: Charles Sommers
- Succeeded by: Dick Ardagh
- Constituency: North-East Province

Personal details
- Born: 23 July 1866 Ratcliff, London, England
- Died: 25 May 1915 (aged 48) Narrogin, Western Australia, Australia

Thomas Frederick Outridge Brimage (23 July 1866 – 25 May 1915) was an Australian businessman and politician who served as a member of the Legislative Council of Western Australia from 1900 to 1912. He was prominent in mining circles on the Eastern Goldfields before entering politics.

== Early life ==
Brimage was born in Ratcliff, London, England, to Emma (née Atkinson) and Thomas Brimage. He moved to Port Pirie, South Australia, as a small child, where his father became the harbour master. After leaving school, Brimage completed an engineering apprenticeship with South Australian Railways, and was then employed as a mechanical draughtsman. He moved to Western Australia in 1894, during the gold rush, and initially set up as a consulting engineer in Coolgardie. Brimage later moved to Kalgoorlie and established himself as a land agent and sharebroker. He became general manager of one major mine and a consulting engineer on several smaller ones, and also pegged out several mining claims of his own.

== Politics and later life ==
In 1896, Brimage was elected to the East Coolgardie Road Board (renamed the Kalgoorlie Road Board in 1897). He served until 1899, including as chairman for a period. Brimage entered parliament at the 1900 Legislative Council election, winning a six-year term as one of three members for the new South Province. He transferred to North-East Province at the 1906 election, but was defeated in his bid for re-election in 1912, losing to Hal Colebatch (a future premier) in East Province. After leaving politics, Brimage worked as a hotelkeeper, living for periods in Kojonup, Katanning, Northam, and Narrogin. He died in Narrogin in May 1915, aged 48, after a long illness. He had married Marie Louise Reynolds in 1896, with whom he had four children.

== See also ==
- Members of the Western Australian Legislative Council
