= Joseph Langsford =

Australian businessman and politician (1865–1957)

The Honourable Joseph Langsford

Member of the Legislative Council of Western Australia
- In office 6 January 1904 – 3 October 1911
- Preceded by: William Brookman
- Succeeded by: James Doland
- Constituency: Metropolitan-Suburban Province

Personal details
- Born: Joseph Wood Langsford; 29 July 1865 Norwood, South Australia, Australia
- Died: 5 April 1957 (aged 91) Claremont, Western Australia, Australia

Joseph Wood Langsford (29 July 1865 – 5 April 1957) was an Australian businessman and politician who was a member of the Legislative Council of Western Australia from 1904 to 1911. He ran for parliament eight times in total, but won election only twice.

== Early life ==
Langsford was born in Adelaide to Mary Ann (née Ware) and John Langsford. He attended Prince Alfred College, and after leaving school found work with the AMP Society (an insurance firm). In 1884, Langsford was sent to Western Australia to work in the company's Perth office. He left AMP in 1896 to set up his own business as an accountant and auditor. In the late 1890s, he became one of the leading advocates for the creation of a new Claremont Municipality (now the Town of Claremont) out of the existing Claremont Road District (now the City of Nedlands). This was accomplished in 1898, and the following year Langsford was elected the inaugural Mayor of Claremont. He held that position until 1901, when he was succeeded by Sydney Stubbs, and later served on the municipal council again from 1903 to 1906, and 1915 to 1918.

== Politics ==
Langsford first stood for parliament at the 1901 state election, running for the Legislative Assembly, but was defeated by William Sayer (the attorney-general) in the newly created seat of Claremont. At the 1902 Claremont by-election, caused by Sayer's resignation, Langsford placed third behind John Foulkes and Frank Wilson. He eventually entered parliament at a 1904 Legislative Council by-election, replacing William Brookman in Metropolitan-Suburban Province. Langsford was re-elected in 1906, but resigned a few months before the end of his second term to contest the Legislative Assembly at the 1911 state election. He again ran in Claremont, but lost to Evan Wisdom, with both candidates standing as Ministerialists. In 1912, Langsford attempted to return to his previous Legislative Council seat, but was defeated by Archibald Sanderson. He recontested Claremont at the 1914 election, but again lost to Wisdom. His final run for parliament came at the 1918 Claremont by-election, where he ran as an independent but was defeated by Thomas Duff.

== Later life ==
Outside of business and politics, Langsford served for periods as treasurer of Methodist Ladies' College and chairman of the board of trustees of Karrakatta Cemetery. He died in Claremont in 1957, aged 91. He had married Agnes Jane Read in 1888, with whom he had five children.
