= Henry Briggs (politician) =

Australian politician

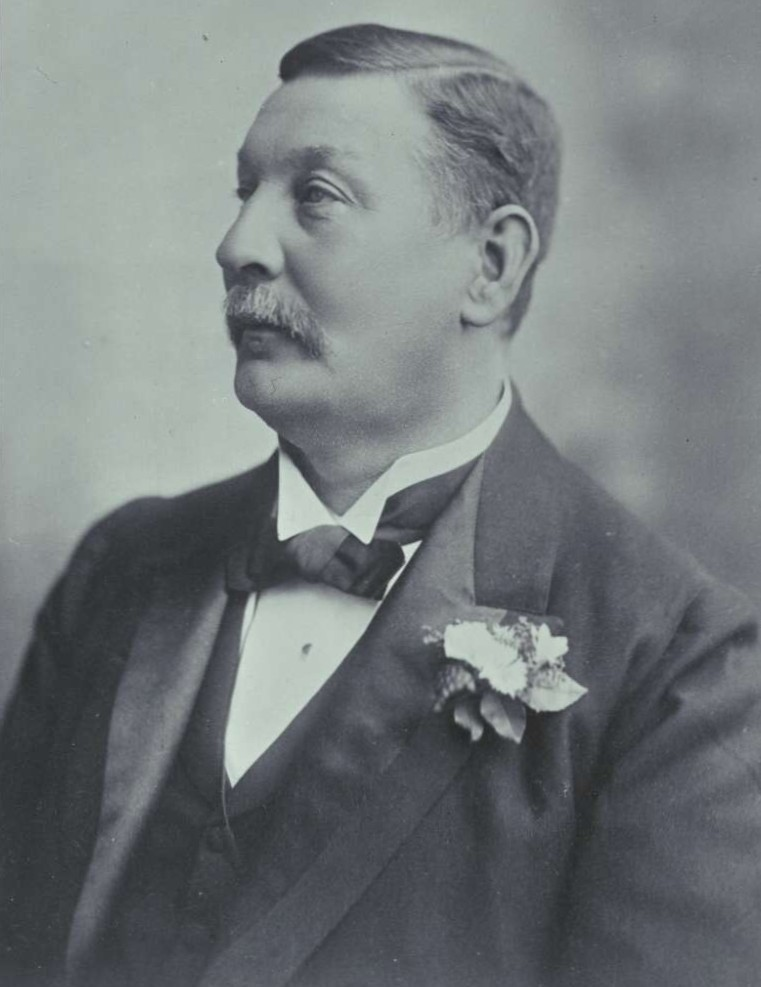
- Henry Briggs at the Australasian National Convention, Melbourne, 1898

3rd President of the Western Australian Legislative Council
- In office 21 June 1906 – 8 June 1919
- Preceded by: George Shenton
- Succeeded by: Walter Kingsmill

Member of the Western Australian Legislative Council for West Province
- In office 30 June 1896 – 8 June 1919
- Preceded by: Edward Davies
- Succeeded by: Alexander Panton

Personal details
- Born: 17 March 1844 Kettering, England, UK
- Died: 8 June 1919 (aged 75) Fremantle, Western Australia, Australia
- Resting place: Fremantle Cemetery
- Party: Liberal (until 1917); Nationalist (from 1917)
- Education: St Mark’s College, Chelsea
- Profession: Teacher, politician

Sir Henry Briggs (17 March 1844 – 8 June 1919), Australian politician, was a Member of the Western Australian Legislative Council for 23 years, and its President for 13 years.

== Life ==
Born in Kettering, Northamptonshire, England on 17 March 1844, Henry Briggs was the son of shoemaker George Briggs and Sarah née Tibbutt. He was educated at Kettering National School and later at St. Mark's College in Chelsea where he was a Queen's Scholar. He became a lecturer on scientific matters for the South Kensington Museum, and was headmaster of Mottram Grammar School from 1868 to 1878. In 1878 the board of governors sent him to Western Australia to found the Fremantle Grammar School. He became the school's headmaster from its establishment in 1885 until 1889, when he resigned to open his own school. The governors of his old school were presented with Briggs leaving and all the pupils following him. He later purchased the Fremantle Grammar School and returned as its headmaster until 1897. (The grammar school closed in 1905 and that was put down to Briggs' interest in politics.)

Briggs became secretary of the Fremantle Chamber of Commerce in 1883, holding the position until 1895. In that year he became a Justice of the Peace. On 30 June 1896, Briggs was elected to the Western Australian Legislative Council for the West Province in a by-election occasioned by the resignation of Edward Davies. He became heavily involved in the Federation movement, becoming president of the Fremantle branch of the Australian Federation League, and representing Western Australia at a series of federal conventions, including the National Australasian Convention in Adelaide in 1897, and the Australasian Federal Conventions in Sydney in 1897 and Melbourne in 1898. On 7 June 1900 he was appointed Chairman of Committees in the Legislative Council, holding the office until 20 June 1906, when he was promoted to President of the Legislative Council. He would hold the presidency until his death 13 years later.

Briggs' contributions during his parliamentary career include examining a scheme of commercial qualifications in 1904, and being a member of the 1910 Royal Commission into the establishment of the University of Western Australia. He was also a member of the committee on technical education, a trustee of the Western Australian public library, museum and art gallery, and a prominent freemason.

In 1916, Briggs was knighted for his work as President of the Legislative Council. He died, unmarried, on 8 June 1919, and was buried in Fremantle Cemetery.

Western Australian Legislative Council
| Preceded by Edward Davies | Member for West Province; 1896–1919 | Succeeded by Alexander Panton |
| Preceded by George Shenton | President of the Western Australian Legislative Council; 1906–1919 | Succeeded by Walter Kingsmill |
