= Adam Jameson =

Scottish-born physician and government minister of physics

The Honourable Dr Adam Jameson
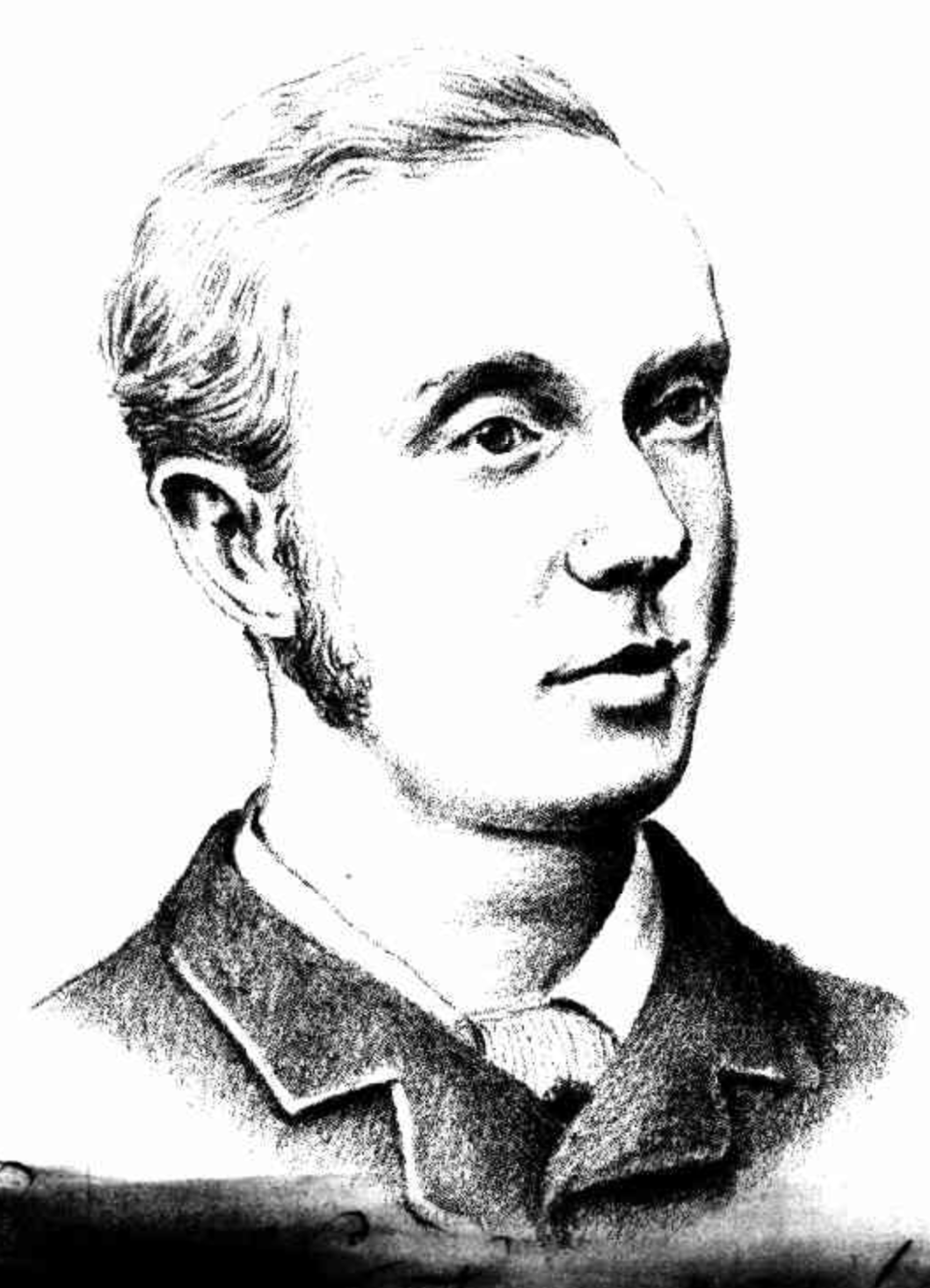
- Jameson in 1888

Member of the Legislative Council of Western Australia
- In office 29 August 1900 – 23 January 1905
- Preceded by: None (new creation)
- Succeeded by: Walter Kingsmill
- Constituency: Metropolitan-Suburban Province

Member of the Legislative Council of the Transvaal
- In office January 1903 – February 1907
- Constituency: None (nominated by governor)

Personal details
- Born: 5 May 1860 Pathhead, Fife, Scotland
- Died: 12 March 1907 (aged 46) Alkmaar, Transvaal, South Africa
- Education: University of Edinburgh

Adam Jameson (5 May 1860 – 12 March 1907) was a Scottish-born physician who was a member of parliament and government minister in both the Australian state of Western Australia and the Transvaal Colony (in present-day South Africa).

== Early life ==
Jameson was born in Pathhead, Fife, Scotland, where his father, Charles Adam Jameson, was a Church of Scotland minister. He attended Craigmount School, Edinburgh, before going on to study medicine at the University of Edinburgh, graduating M.B., C.M. in 1883. After a brief period at Chalmers Hospital, Banff, Jameson left for Western Australia, arriving in 1884. In 1889, he married Ethel Mary Hensman, the daughter of Alfred Hensman (a former Attorney-General of Western Australia). Jameson left for Europe in 1893, on a health trip, and lived in Rome until his wife's death in 1897. That same year he received his medical degree from the University of Edinburgh, and then returned to Australia.

== Australian politics ==
Jameson first attempted to enter politics at the 1890 general election, the first to be held for the Legislative Assembly. He was defeated by William Silas Pearse in the seat of North Fremantle. In 1899, Jameson was appointed chairman of a royal commission into the prisons system in Western Australia. He was elected to parliament at the 1900 Legislative Council elections, as one of three members for the newly created Metropolitan-Suburban Province. In George Leake's first government, which lasted from June to November 1901, Jameson served as a minister without portfolio. When Leake returned as premier in December 1901, he was made Minister for Lands. He remained in the position under Walter James (who became premier in July 1902 following Leake's death in office), but resigned from both parliament and the ministry in January 1903 in order to go to South Africa.

== South African politics ==
The Governor of Western Australia from 1901 to 1902 was Sir Arthur Lawley, who left office when he was appointed Lieutenant-Governor of the Transvaal. In late 1902, Lawley offered Jameson the position of Commissioner of Lands in his government, which would also make him an ex officio member of the Transvaal Legislative Council. Jameson accepted the position, which he took up the following year. Outside of his friendship with Lawley, he also had another connection with South Africa – his second cousin, Leander Starr Jameson, was a Prime Minister of the Cape Colony. Jameson served in the ministry until early 1907, when responsible government was implemented, and received a substantial pension after his retirement.

== Death ==
After leaving South Africa, Jameson intended to take a brief trip to London, and then to retire to Cairo. He left Pretoria in March 1907, taking an overnight train to Lourenço Marques, Mozambique. However, recent heavy rainfall had washed away a culvert on the line near Alkmaar, and caused the train to derail. Jameson and eleven others were killed in the accident. He was survived by his three daughters, living in London, and a sister, who was married to John Foulkes (an MP in Western Australia).
