= Henry Stephenson (Australian politician) =

Australian politician (1862–1930)

The Honourable Henry Stephenson

Member of the Legislative Council of Western Australia
- In office 22 May 1924 – 21 May 1930
- Preceded by: Harry Boan
- Succeeded by: James Macfarlane
- Constituency: Metropolitan-Suburban Province

Personal details
- Born: 24 October 1862 Port Sorell, Tasmania, Australia
- Died: 28 December 1930 (aged 68) Subiaco, Western Australia, Australia
- Party: Nationalist

Henry Alfred Stephenson (24 October 1862 – 28 December 1930) was an Australian businessman and politician who was a Nationalist member of the Legislative Council of Western Australia from 1924 to 1930.

Stephenson was born in Port Sorell, Tasmania, to Margaret (née Develin) and Frederick Wilkinson Stephenson. He spent his early life in Devonport, a larger town nearby, where he worked as a carpenter and later as a produce merchant. Stephenson served on the Devonport Town Council from 1891 to 1897, when he left for Western Australia. Settling in Perth, where he had his own business, he went on to serve two terms as president of the Perth Chamber of Commerce, and was also chairman of an insurance company and a coal prospecting firm. Stephenson was elected to parliament at the 1924 Legislative Council elections, replacing Harry Boan in Metropolitan-Suburban Province. He stood for re-election in 1930, but was defeated by another Nationalist candidate, James Macfarlane. Outside of politics, Stephenson had a keen interest in horse racing, owning several successful racehorses and serving on the committee of the Western Australian Turf Club. He died in Perth in December 1930 (aged 68), after a long illness. He had married Louisa Wood in 1884, with whom he had four children.
