= William Brookman =

Australian mining entrepreneur and politician

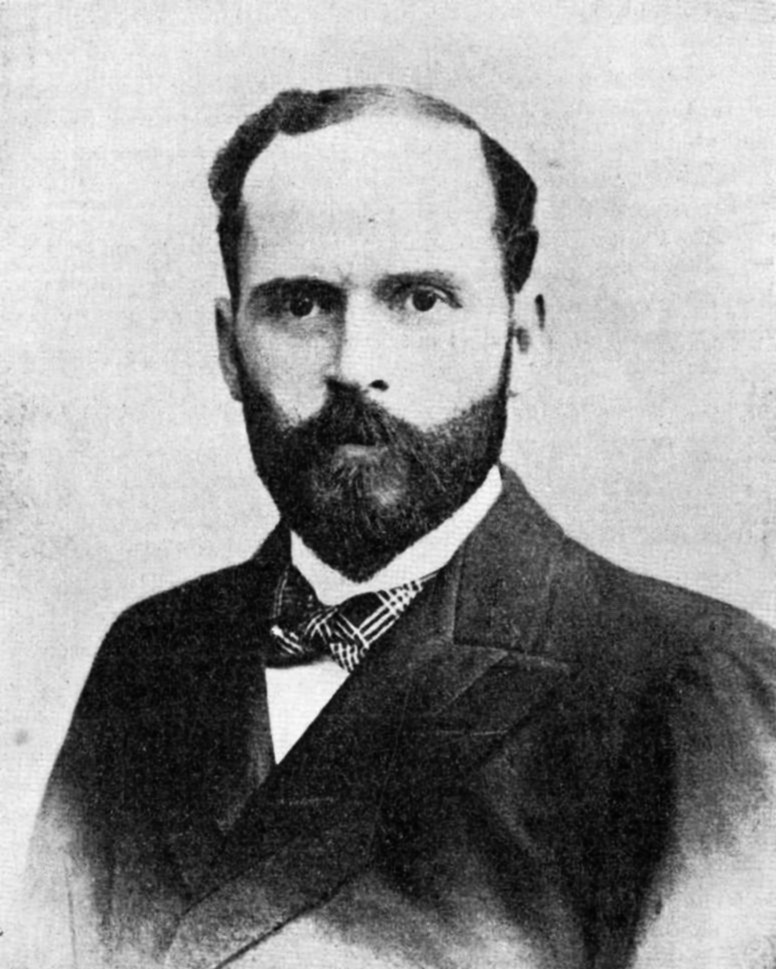

Mayor of Perth
- In office 1 December 1900 – 26 June 1901
- Preceded by: Alexander Forrest
- Succeeded by: Stephen Parker

Member of the Legislative Council of Western Australia
- In office 29 August 1900 – 15 December 1903
- Preceded by: None (new seat)
- Succeeded by: Joseph Langsford
- Constituency: Metropolitan-Suburban Province

Personal details
- Born: 8 August 1859 Prospect, South Australia, Australia
- Died: 5 January 1910 (aged 50) Prospect, South Australia, Australia

William Gordon Brookman (8 August 1859 – 5 January 1910) was an Australian mining entrepreneur and politician. He made a fortune in the Western Australian gold rush of the 1890s, and later served as Mayor of Perth from 1900 to 1901 and as a member of the Legislative Council of Western Australia from 1900 to 1903.

== Early life ==
Brookman was born in Adelaide, Colony of South Australia, to Jane (née Wilson) and Benjamin Brookman, his father being a printer. His parents, originally from Glasgow, Scotland, had moved to Australia seven years before his birth. Brookman attended North Adelaide Grammar School, leaving in 1875 after securing a position as a government clerk. He considered the civil service monotonous, and in 1880 left to work for his older brother George Brookman, a land agent and general merchant. Brookman later bought into Chance & Co., a jam and pickle manufacturer. The company went bankrupt in 1890 (with insolvency proceedings dragging on for two years), and Brookman received most of the blame for its collapse.

== Mining ==
After the collapse of his company, Brookman and a schoolmate, Charles De Rose, went to the Glen Taggart goldfields (near Mount Burr). They staked a small claim after partnering with a more experienced prospector, Sam Pearce, but had little success. In late 1892, the three men heard the news that gold had been discovered at Coolgardie, Western Australia. Brookman convinced his brother to form a syndicate to finance a prospecting party, and in June 1893 he and Pearce set off for Western Australia. They travelled from Perth to York by train and then proceeded to Coolgardie on foot, walking ahead of a dray carrying their equipment. On their journey, they heard of Paddy Hannan's discovery of gold at what would become Kalgoorlie, and chose to continue there rather than examine the Coolgardie field.

Unlike almost all of the other prospectors, Brookman and Pearce were not seeking alluvial (surface) gold, but instead were after gold in reef or lode form, which would be fit for commercial mining. They pegged out a 20-acre (0.081 km^{2}) claim in their first few days, and in the next weeks and months had made so many other claims that it was joked that they were planning to establish a sheep station. Shortly after their arrival, Brookman and Pearce had moved their camp some distance from Hannan's main camp (the future Kalgoorlie townsite). Their camp's population swelled in size as they began to hire other prospectors to assist them, and over the next few years grew into a town, which was named Boulder.

While Brookman oversaw operations on the ground in Western Australia, his brother reconstituted their syndicate (now called the Coolgardie Gold Mining and Prospecting Company) as a public company on the Adelaide stock exchange. He also floated several subsidiaries in other colonies. By the time Brookman left Western Australia in 1895, he had pegged out 2,000 acres (8.1 km^{2}) of territory, which would eventually house some of the most lucrative mines in Western Australia. He first went to Adelaide to resolve his earlier bankruptcy, and then went on to England to secure capital from London's financiers. Brookman spent just over a year in London, acquiring directorships in thirty mining companies and reputedly becoming a millionaire.

== Politics ==
On his return to Perth, Brookman's reputation was such that he was called upon to act as a spokesman for the mining industry. He was an opponent of John Forrest's government, which he and many other miners viewed as unsympathetic to their interests. Brookman was elected to parliament at the 1900 Legislative Council election, winning a six-year term in the new Metropolitan-Suburban Province. He was not actually in Perth for the election, instead letting his supporters campaign for him while he attended the 1900 Paris Exhibition. Later in the year, Brookman was also elected Mayor of Perth, defeating two other candidates (Timothy Quinlan and Thomas Molloy) by a large margin.

Brookman's status as a political outsider helped secure his victory in the mayoral race, but once in office it proved to be a disadvantage. His lack of alignment with any of the existing council factions meant he was unable to control the agenda of council meetings, leading to persistent criticism from the press. After a series of minor controversies, Brookman resigned the mayoralty in June 1901. He continued on in the Legislative Council until December 1903, when his seat was declared vacant due to non-attendance.

== Later life ==
As was the norm before payment of members, Brookman maintained his business interests while in parliament. He suffered heavy losses in a stock-market collapse and also lost several directorships due to unexplained absences, finally losing much of his remaining wealth in a failed venture to build a smelting plant at South Fremantle. Brookman moved to Mandurah for a period, and then spent his final years travelling with his widowed sister, all the while suffering from tuberculosis. He died at his father's home in Adelaide in January 1910, aged only 50. His estate was valued at £134 10s.
