= William Glasheen =

Australian politician

William Glasheen MLC

Member of the Western Australian Legislative Council for South-East Province
- In office 18 July 1925 – 1932

William Thomas Glasheen (10 November 1876 – 19 February 1941) was an Australian politician. He was a member of the Western Australian Legislative Council representing the South-East Province from his election on 18 July 1925 until his retirement in 1932. Glasheen was a member of the Country Party.
