= John Brown (Western Australian politician) =

Australian politician

The Honourable John Brown MLC

Member of the Western Australian Legislative Council for North-East Province
- In office 22 May 1924 – 1930

Personal details
- Born: 30 December 1867 Newtown, Scarsdale, Victoria, Australia
- Died: 25 February 1930 (aged 62) Subiaco, Western Australia
- Spouse: Olivia Jane Blakely
- Children: 3

John Reid Brown (30 December 1867 – 25 February 1930) was an Australian politician. He was a member of the Western Australian Legislative Council representing the North-East Province from his election on 22 May 1924 until his retirement in 1930. Brown was a member of the Labor Party.
