= Metropolitan-Suburban Province =

Former electoral province of the Western Australia

The Metropolitan-Suburban Province was a three-member electoral province of the Western Australian Legislative Council, located in the metropolitan region of Perth. It was created by the Constitution Acts Amendment Act 1899, and became effective on 29 August 1900 following a special election to fill all three seats. Historically taking in many coastal and riverside areas in the western suburbs of Perth, it was considered safe for the Nationalist Party for most of its existence.

At the 1950 elections, it was renamed Suburban Province, losing Claremont and Subiaco and moving inland. In 1963–1964, electoral changes to the Legislative Council, which abolished the 10 three-member seats and created 15 two-member seats in their place, resulted in the seat's abolishment, with its area being divided between North-East Metropolitan Province and South-East Metropolitan Province.

== Geography ==
The province was made up of several complete Legislative Assembly districts, which changed at each distribution. It had a more restrictive franchise than the Legislative Assembly, however, so not all voters in the corresponding Assembly districts were eligible to vote in the Council.

Redistribution	Period	Electoral districts	Electors	% of State
1899	29 August 1900 – 22 May 1904	Claremont, Guildford, South Perth, Subiaco		
1904	22 May 1904 – 22 May 1912	Balcatta, Canning, Claremont, Guildford, Subiaco	6,858	18.10%
1911	22 May 1912 – 22 May 1930	Canning, Claremont, Guildford, Leederville, Subiaco	12,093	25.65%
1929	22 May 1930 – 22 May 1950	Canning, Claremont, Guildford-Midland, Leederville, Maylands, Middle Swan, Mount Hawthorn, Nedlands, South Perth, Subiaco Victoria Park,		
1948	22 May 1950 – 22 May 1956	Canning, Guildford-Midland, Maylands, Middle Swan, Mount Hawthorn, Mount Lawley, South Perth, Victoria Park,		
1955	22 May 1956 – 22 May 1962	Beeloo, Guildford-Midland, Maylands, Middle Swan, Mount Lawley, South Perth, Victoria Park,		
1961	22 May 1962 – 22 May 1965	Bayswater, Beeloo, Belmont, Maylands, Mount Lawley, South Perth, Swan, Victoria Park,		

== Representation ==
=== Members ===
Member 1	Party	Term	Member 2	Party	Term	Member 3	Party	Term
William Brookman		1900–1903	Adam Jameson		1900–1903	James Speed		1900–1902
William Brookman		1900–1903	Adam Jameson		1900–1903	Barrington Wood		1902–1903
Joseph Langsford		1904–1911	Walter Kingsmill		1903–1910	Zebina Lane		1903–1908
Joseph Langsford		1904–1911	Walter Kingsmill		1903–1910	Sydney Stubbs	Ministerial	1908–1911
James Doland	Labor	1911–1912	Douglas Gawler	Liberal	1910–1915	Frederick Davis	Labor	1911–1914
Archibald Sanderson	Liberal	1912–1917	Athelstan Saw	Liberal	1914–1917	Joseph Duffell	Liberal	1914–1917
Archibald Sanderson	Nationalist	1917–1922	Athelstan Saw	Nationalist	1917–1929	Joseph Duffell	Nationalist	1917–1926
Harry Boan	Nationalist	1922–1924	Athelstan Saw	Nationalist	1917–1929	Joseph Duffell	Nationalist	1917–1926
Henry Stephenson	Nationalist	1924–1930	Athelstan Saw	Nationalist	1917–1929	Sir William Lathlain	Nationalist	1926–1932
James Macfarlane	Nationalist	1930–1942	Sir Charles Nathan	Nationalist	1930–1934	Alec Clydesdale	Labor	1932–1938
James Macfarlane	Nationalist	1930–1942	Hubert Parker	Nationalist	1934–1945	Alec Clydesdale	Labor	
Frank Gibson	Nationalist	1942–1945	Hubert Parker	Nationalist	1934–1945	James Dimmitt	Nationalist	1938–1945
Frank Gibson	Liberal	1945–1956	Hubert Parker	Liberal	1945–1954	James Dimmitt	Liberal	1945–1953
George Jeffery	Labor	1956–1962	Ruby Hutchison	Labor	1954–1965	Arthur Griffith	Liberal	1953–1965
Herbert R. Robinson	Liberal	1962–1965	Ruby Hutchison	Labor	1954–1965	Arthur Griffith	Liberal	1953–1965
