= Edgar Harris =

Australian politician

Edgar Harris MLC

Member of the Western Australian Legislative Council for North-East Province
- In office 22 May 1920 – 1934

Edgar Henry Harris (11 August 1875 – 13 February 1934) was an Australian politician. He was a member of the Western Australian Legislative Council representing the North-East Province from his election on 22 May 1920 until his retirement in 1934. Harris was a member of the Australian Labor Party until 1917, when he became a member of the National Party.
