= Herbert Yelland =

Australian politician (1878–1962)

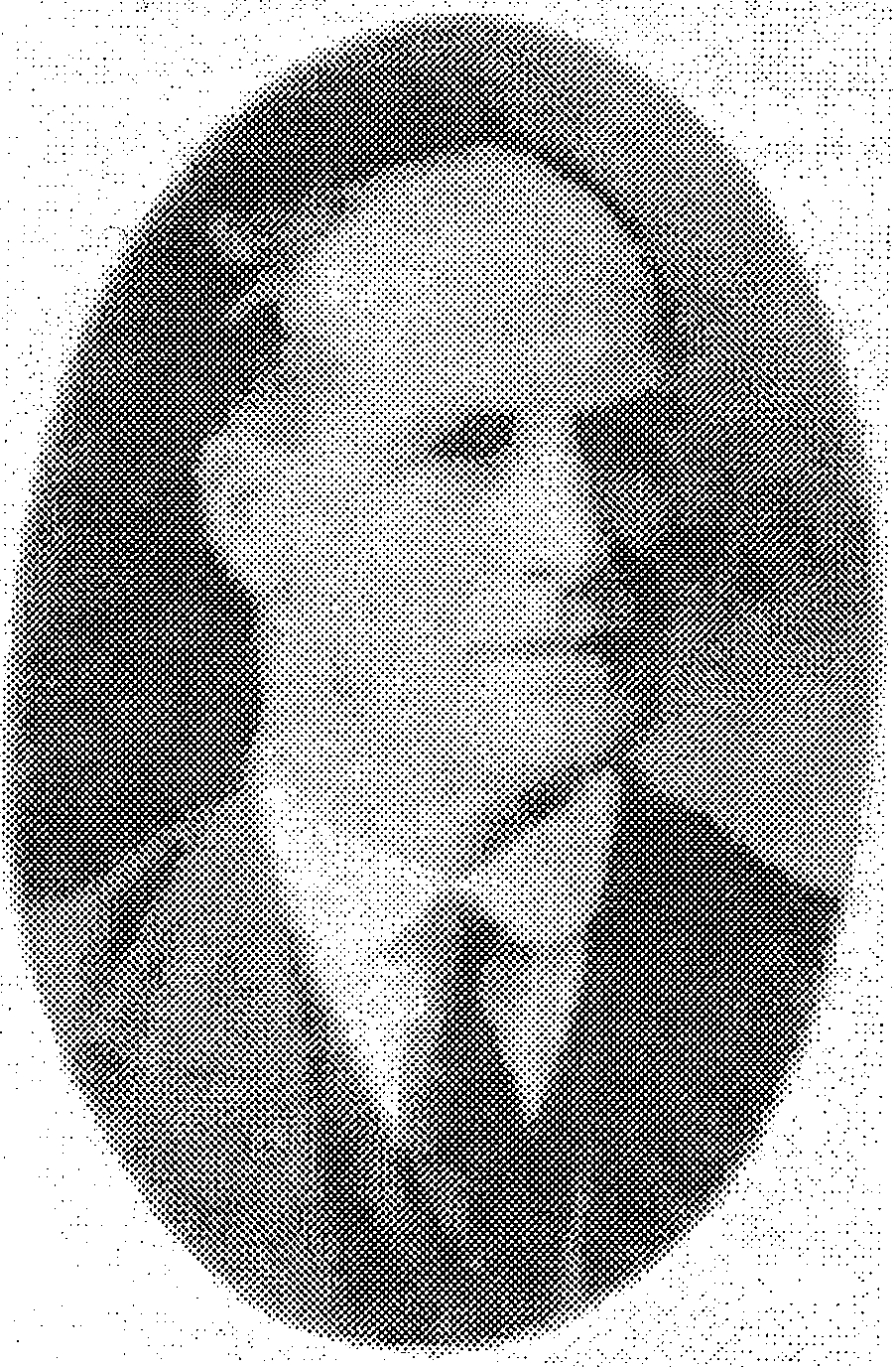
Herbert Yelland

Herbert John Yelland (27 February 1878 – 22 May 1962) was a Member of the Western Australian Legislative Council from 1924 to 1936.

== Biography ==
Herbert Yelland was born at Point Macleay in South Australia on 27 February 1878. The son of a farmer, he was educated at Roseworthy Agricultural College, and in 1899 started working for the South Australian education department. By 1901 he had emigrated to Western Australia and was working as a schoolmaster at Midland. In 1904 he took up a position of Clerk in the Lands Department, remaining there until 1911. In 1905 he married Rose Franklin; they had two sons and one daughter. Yelland resigned his job in 1911 and took up land in the Bruce Rock district, becoming one of the district's pioneer farmers.

Yelland joined the Nationalist Party in 1923, and that August unsuccessfully contested the Legislative Council seat of East Province in a by-election. The following year he contested the seat again, this time in a general election, and won. He held the seat until the election of May 1936. In 1928 he completed a Bachelor of Science in Agriculture from the University of Western Australia. Yelland contested the 1944 Swan by-election for the Nationalists, but placed sixth out of six candidates. From 1945 he farmed at Calingiri with his son. He died on 22 May 1962 and was buried in Karrakatta Cemetery.
