= Walter Kingsmill =

Australian politician (1864–1935)

The Honourable Sir Walter Kingsmill
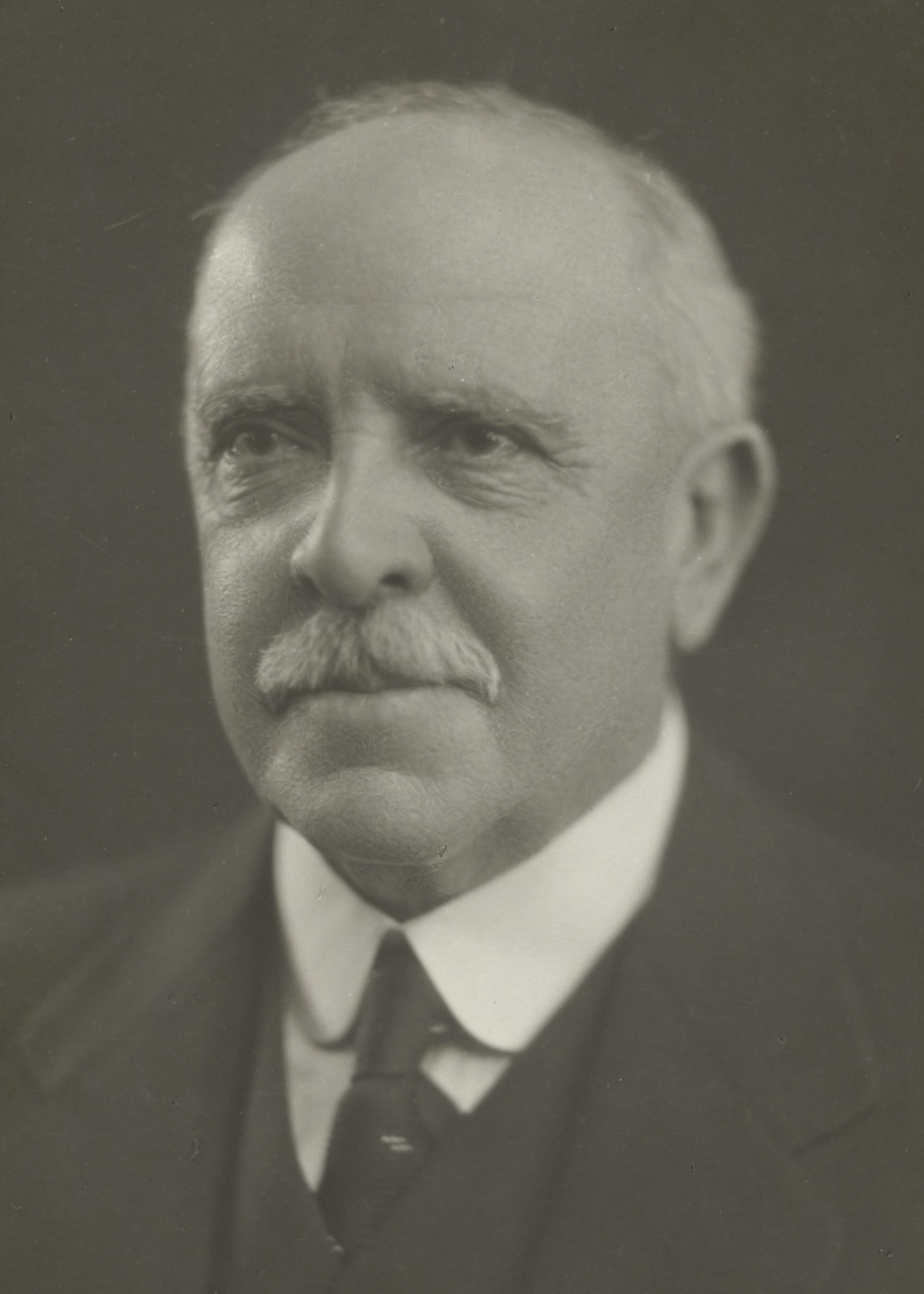

President of the Senate
- In office 14 August 1929 – 30 August 1932
- Preceded by: John Newlands
- Succeeded by: Patrick Lynch

Senator for Western Australia
- In office 1 July 1923 – 15 January 1935

President of the Western Australian Legislative Council
- In office 31 July 1919 – 21 May 1922
- Preceded by: Henry Briggs
- Succeeded by: Edward Wittenoom

Personal details
- Born: 10 April 1864 Glenelg, South Australia, Australia
- Died: 15 January 1935 (aged 70) Elizabeth Bay, New South Wales, Australia
- Party: Nationalist (1923–31); UAP (1931–35)
- Spouse: Mary Agatha Fanning (m. 1899)
- Education: University of Adelaide
- Occupation: Mine manager

Sir Walter Kingsmill (10 April 1864 – 15 January 1935) was an Australian politician who served as a Senator for Western Australia from 1923 to 1935. He was President of the Senate from 1929 to 1932.

Kingsmill was born in Adelaide and became a geologist and prospector. He moved to Western Australia in 1888, participating in the Pilbara goldrush and serving as a mining registrar. Kingsmill was a member of the Western Australian Legislative Assembly (1897–1903) and Legislative Council (1903–1922), serving as a state government minister and president of the Legislative Council (1919–1922). He transferred to the Senate at the 1922 federal election, serving two terms as a Nationalist and United Australia Party senator. Outside of politics he had a long association with the Perth Zoo.

== Early life ==
Kingsmill was born on 10 April 1864 in Glenelg, South Australia. He was the son of Jane Elizabeth (née Haslam) and Walter Kingsmill; his father was a pastoralist.

Kingsmill attended St Peter's College, Adelaide. He graduated Bachelor of Arts from the University of Adelaide in 1883 and subsequently joined the Geological Department of South Australia. In 1886 he left the public service to work as a prospector, spending time on the Teetulpa and Mannahill goldfields and in the Barrier Ranges of New South Wales.

In 1888, Kingsmill moved to Western Australia, initially settling in Perth where he represented the Victorians Football Club in two matches in the West Australian Football League during the 1888 season. He soon moved to the north-west to participate in the Pilbara goldrush, remaining in the district for eight years where he managed the Stray Shot, Excelsior, Augusta, and Talga-Talga mines. He served as mining registrar at Marble Bar from November 1894 to October 1895 and was also a member of the Pilbara Road Board.

== Western Australian politics ==
Kingsmill was elected to the Western Australian Legislative Assembly at the 1897 general election, representing the seat of Pilbara. He was initially a supporter of John Forrest's government, but by 1899 was whip for the opposition.

Kingsmill moved to the Legislative Council in 1903. He served as Minister for Public Works in 1901, Commissioner for Railways 1901–1902, Colonial Secretary 1902–1904 and 1905–1906, and Minister for Education 1902–1904 and 1905–1906. He was President of the Legislative Council 1919–1922.

== Federal politics ==
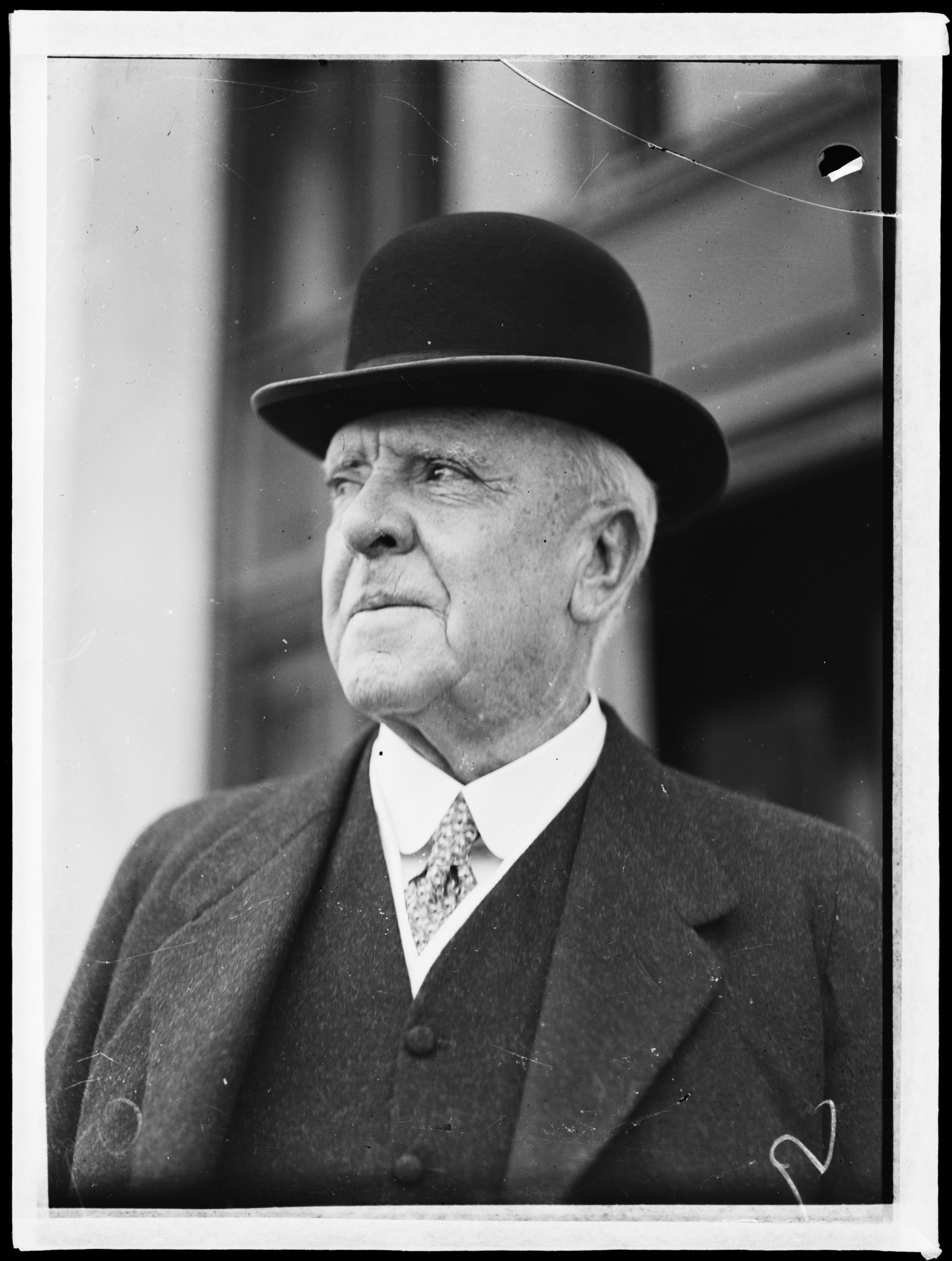
Kingsmill as senator

Kingsmill was elected to the Senate at the 1922 federal election, to a six-year term beginning on 1 July 1923. He was re-elected to a further six-year term at the 1928 election.

Kingsmill served on the Joint Statutory Committee on Public Accounts from 1924 to 1929, including as chairman from 1927. In parliament he spoke regularly on trade and foreign affairs, advocated for improvements in transport and telecommunications, and supported scientific research. He considered that senators should primarily act in the interest of their states, in line with what he viewed as the intent of the constitution, although he typically voted along party lines.

Kingsmill was elected president of the Senate on 14 August 1929, following the retirement of John Newlands. The partyroom vote for the Nationalist nominee for the position was tied between Kingsmill and fellow Western Australian Patrick Lynch, with Kingsmill winning on the casting vote of the party's Senate leader George Pearce. Kingsmill was "strict in the maintenance of standing orders and keen to ensure decorum", ruling even minor insults to be unparliamentary. According to Geoffrey Bolton, the author of his Australian Dictionary of Biography entry, Kingsmill "won respect by his dignified and impartial conduct of business during the Scullin Labor ministry", at a time when the Nationalist Party still held a Senate majority. He did come into conflict with Lang Labor senator James Dunn on several occasions, notably after the 1932 New South Wales constitutional crisis when he ordered Dunn to remove a bust of Jack Lang from his desk; this led Dunn to call him the "Mussolini of the Senate".

On 7 May 1931, Kingsmill chaired the meeting of opposition members at which the United Australia Party (UAP) came into existence as a parliamentary party. Following the 1931, he was narrowly defeated by Lynch as the UAP's nominee for Senate president, with his term ending on 20 August 1932. In December 1933, at the urging of Senate clerk-assistant Robert Broinowski, Kingsmill successfully lobbied Prime Minister Joseph Lyons against a plan to construct the National Library of Australia buildings in the gardens of Parliament House. He failed to win UAP preselection for the 1934 election, likely due to his lack of support for the Western Australian secession movement. He died in office on 15 January 1935, before the conclusion of his term.

== Personal life ==
Kingsmill married Mary Fanning in 1899, but had no children. He moved to Sydney after his election to the Senate and died of a coronary occlusion at his home in Elizabeth Bay on 15 January 1935, aged 70. He was cremated at Rookwood Cemetery and his ashes were later scattered by the senate clerk over the rose gardens at Parliament House.

Kingsmill served two terms as president of the Lawn Tennis Association of Western Australia and was voted a life member. He was the president of the board of Perth Zoo from 1916 to 1922 and acting director from 1916 to 1917, during which time he travelled to Singapore and the Federated Malay States to buy animals. He was also a member of the senate of the University of Western Australia and the Kings Park board. Botanist Joseph Maiden named a species of mallee Eucalyptus kingsmillii in his honour.

Parliament of Australia
Preceded by John Newlands	President of the Senate; 1929–1932	Succeeded by Patrick Lynch

Western Australian Legislative Assembly
Preceded by Henry Keep	Member for Pilbara; 1897 – 1903	Succeeded by James Isdell
Western Australian Legislative Council
Preceded by Adam Jameson	Member for Metropolitan-Suburban Province; 1903-1910	Succeeded by Douglas Gawler
Preceded by George Randell	Member for Metropolitan Province; 1910-1922	Succeeded by James Macfarlane
Preceded by Henry Briggs	President of the Western Australian Legislative Council; 1919–1922	Succeeded by Edward Wittenoom
