= William Lathlain =

Sir William Lathlain (1862–1936) was the Mayor of the City of Perth in Western Australia from 1918 to 1923, and Lord Mayor from 1930 to 1932.

Poems were written about him after his first mayoral role.

He contested seats in state politics.

He was involved in the process of establishing the War Memorial in Kings Park, and said of the establishment:

...not for the glorification of war, but in loving memory of men who paid the supreme sacrifice.

— Sir William Lathlain, November 1929, Mayors of the City of Perth 1914–1918 and their legacy in remembering World War

The suburb of Lathlain was named after him.
