= Jabez Dodd =

Australian politician (1867–1928)

Jabez Edward Dodd (14 June 1867 - 2 January 1928) was an Australian politician. He was a member of the Western Australian Legislative Council from 1910 until his death, representing South Province. He was elected as a member of the Australian Labor Party, but left the party in the 1917 Labor split and represented the Nationalist Party thereafter.

Dodd was born at Callington in South Australia. His family moved to Kadina in 1871 when he was aged four. He became a miner, and lived there until 1889; he joined the Wallaroo Miners' Union aged 17. Dodd went to Broken Hill in New South Wales from 1889 to 1896, during which he was involved in the 1890 maritime strike and 1892 Broken Hill miners' strike. He then went to Coolgardie in Western Australia, where he continued as a miner and became involved in trade union work before moving to Kalgoorlie in 1899. Dodd was a founder of the Amalgamated Workers' Association (AWA) and then the Amalgamated Miners' Association (AMA). He was secretary of the Kalgoorlie–Boulder branch of the Westralian Federated Miners' Union from 1899 to 1911, was vice-president of the Goldfields Trades and Labour Council in 1903, was appointed a justice of the peace in 1904 and was a regular contributor to The Worker. He was an unsuccessful candidate for South Province at the 1908 biennial Legislative Council elections.

Dodd was elected to the Legislative Council at the 1910 biennial election. He served as Minister Without Portfolio under John Scaddan from 1911 to 1916. Dodd was expelled from the Labor Party in April 1917 during the 1917 Labor split and joined the new National Labor Party. He died in office in the Perth suburb of Subiaco in January 1928 and was buried at Karrakatta Cemetery.
