= Metropolitan Province (Western Australia) =

The Metropolitan Province was a multi-member electoral province of the Western Australian Legislative Council, located in the metropolitan region of Perth. It was created by the Constitution Acts Amendment Act 1893, and became effective on 22 May 1894 following the first council elections following the granting of responsible government to Western Australia. The seat was safe for the Liberal Party and its predecessors.

Until the 1950 elections, it covered Perth's central business district and nearby environs, but moved at that point to the western and northern suburbs while still extending to include Perth itself. In 1963–1964, electoral changes to the Legislative Council, which abolished the 10 three-member seats and created 15 two-member seats in their place, resulted in the seat shrinking into the wealthy western suburbs region. Thereafter, it was a safe seat for the Liberal Party. In 1989, the province was abolished by the Acts Amendment (Electoral Reform) Act 1987, and with two others became part of the North Metropolitan Region under the new proportional voting system.

== Geography ==
The province was made up of several complete Legislative Assembly districts, which changed at each distribution. It had a more restrictive franchise than the Legislative Assembly, however, so not all voters in the corresponding Assembly districts were eligible to vote in the Council.

Redistribution	Period	Electoral districts	Electors	% of State
1893	22 May 1894 – 22 May 1898	Perth, East Perth, West Perth		
1896	22 May 1898 – 22 May 1900	Perth, East Perth, North Perth, West Perth		
1899	22 May 1900 – 22 May 1904	Perth, East Perth, North Perth, West Perth		
1904	22 May 1904 – 22 May 1912	Perth, East Perth, North Perth, West Perth		
1911	22 May 1912 – 22 May 1930	Perth, East Perth, North Perth, West Perth		
1929	22 May 1930 – 22 May 1950	Perth, East Perth, North Perth, West Perth		
1948	22 May 1950 – 22 May 1956	Claremont, Cottesloe, East Perth, Leederville, Nedlands, North Perth, Subiaco, Wembley Beaches, West Perth		
1955	22 May 1956 – 22 May 1962	Claremont, Cottesloe, East Perth, Leederville, Mount Hawthorn, Nedlands, North Perth, Subiaco, Wembley Beaches, West Perth		
1961	22 May 1962 – 22 May 1965	Balcatta, Claremont, Cottesloe, Karrinyup, Mount Hawthorn, Nedlands, Perth, Subiaco, Wembley		
1963–64	22 May 1965 – 22 May 1968	Claremont, Cottesloe, Nedlands, Perth, Subiaco		
1966	22 May 1968 – 22 May 1974	Cottesloe, Floreat, Nedlands, Perth, Subiaco		
1972	22 May 1974 – 22 May 1977	Cottesloe, Floreat, Nedlands, Perth, Subiaco		
1976	22 May 1977 – 22 May 1983	Cottesloe, Floreat, Nedlands, Perth, Subiaco		
1982	22 May 1983 – 22 May 1989	Cottesloe, Floreat, Nedlands, Perth, Subiaco		

== Representation ==
=== Members ===
Three-member seat

Member 1	Party	Term	Member 2	Party	Term	Member 3	Party	Term
Sir George Shenton		1894–1906	Stephen Henry Parker		1894–1897	Henry Saunders		1894–1902
Sir George Shenton		1894–1906	George Randell		1897–1910	Henry Saunders		1894–1902
Sir George Shenton		1894–1906	George Randell		1897–1910	James Wright		1902–1908
Charles Sommers	Liberal	1906–1918	Walter Kingsmill		1903–1922	Arthur Jenkins	Liberal	1908–1917
Charles Sommers	Liberal	1906–1918	Walter Kingsmill		1903–1922	Harry Boan	Nationalist	1917–1918
Henry Saunders	Independent	1918–1919	Walter Kingsmill		1903–1922	John Nicholson	Nationalist	1918–1941
Arthur Lovekin	Nationalist	1919–1931	James Macfarlane	Nationalist	1922–1928	John Nicholson	Nationalist	1918–1941
Leonard Bolton	Nationalist	1932–1945	James Franklin	Nationalist	1928–1940	John Nicholson	Nationalist	1918–1941
Leonard Bolton	Nationalist	1932–1945	Sir Hal Colebatch	Nationalist	1940–1945	James Hislop	Nationalist	1941–1945
Leonard Bolton	Liberal	1945–1948	Sir Hal Colebatch	Liberal	1945–1948	James Hislop	Liberal	1945–1965
Keith Watson	Liberal	1948–1965	Harry Hearn	Liberal	1948–1956	James Hislop	Liberal	1945–1965
Keith Watson	Liberal	1948–1965	Reg Mattiske	Liberal	1956–1965	James Hislop	Liberal	1945–1965

Two-member seat

Member 1	Party	Term	Member 2	Party	Term
James Hislop	Liberal	1965–1971	Keith Watson	Liberal	1965–1968
John Williams	Liberal	1971–1989	Ian Medcalf	Liberal	1968–1986
John Williams	Liberal	1971–1989	Max Evans	Liberal	1986–1989
