= Edwin Rose =

Australian politician (1863–1948)

The Honourable Edwin Rose

Member of the Legislative Council of Western Australia
- In office 22 May 1916 – 21 May 1934
- Preceded by: Edward McLarty
- Succeeded by: Hobart Tuckey
- Constituency: South-West Province

Personal details
- Born: 12 December 1863 Harvey, Western Australia, Australia
- Died: 11 January 1948 (aged 84) Bunbury, Western Australia, Australia
- Party: Liberal (to 1917); Nationalist (from 1917)
- Spouse: Janet Louisa Clarke (m.1902–1926; her death)

Edwin Rose (12 December 1863 – 11 January 1948) was an Australian politician who was a member of the Legislative Council of Western Australia from 1916 to 1934, representing South-West Province.

Rose was born in Harvey, Western Australia, to Annie Bishop (née Allnutt) and Robert Henry Rose. Having followed their father into farming, in 1887 he and his brother George Canler Rose became managers and part-owners of Quanbun Station, a pastoral lease in the Kimberley. They were later also involved with Cherrabun Station. In 1898, Rose returned to the South-West, purchasing a farm in Brunswick. He served on the Harvey Road Board in 1910. Rose entered parliament at the 1916 Legislative Council elections, standing for the Liberal Party. He switched to the Nationalist Party upon its foundation the following year, and was re-elected as a Nationalist in 1922 and 1928. Rose left parliament at the expiration of his third term, in 1934, and eventually retired to Bunbury, dying there in January 1948 (aged 84). He had married Janet Louise Clarke in 1902, with whom he had two daughters. His father-in-law, Ephraim Clarke, was also a member of the Legislative Council, and the two sat together between 1916 and 1921.
