= Arthur Lovekin =

Journalist, newspaper editor and owner, and politician

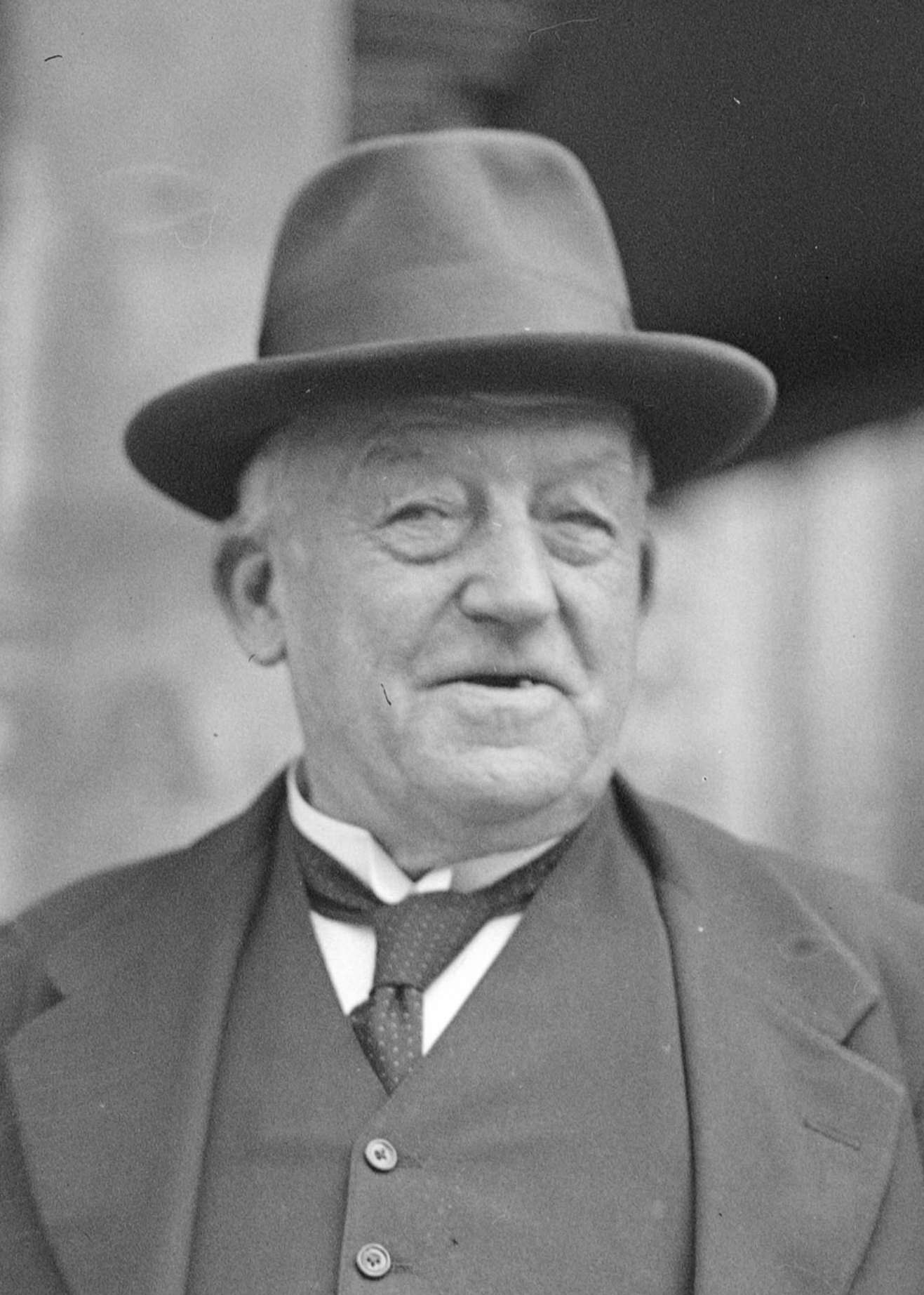
- Lovekin in 1930

Member of the Western Australian Legislative Council
- In office 15 November 1919 – 10 December 1931
- Constituency: Metropolitan Province

Personal details
- Born: 12 November 1859 Slough, Buckinghamshire, England
- Died: 10 December 1931 (aged 72) West Perth, Western Australia, Australia
- Party: Nationalist
- Spouse: Elizabeth Letcher (m. 1882; died 1929)
- Occupation: Journalist

Arthur Lovekin (12 November 1859 – 10 December 1931) was an Australian journalist, newspaper proprietor, and politician. He had a long association with The Daily News in Perth, Western Australia, initially as editor and later as owner. He was a member of the Western Australian Legislative Council from 1919 until his death in 1931 and was a prominent advocate for Western Australia's secession from the federation. He was also involved in the development of Kings Park and founded the Arthur Lovekin Prize in Journalism.

== Early life ==
Lovekin was born in England on 12 November 1859, probably in Slough, Buckinghamshire, but possibly in Sevenoaks, Kent. He was the son of Mariann (née Kenyon) and Lewis James Lovekin; his father was an Anglican clergyman. He was partly educated at St Edmund's School, Canterbury, from 1871 to 1875.

== Victoria and South Australia ==
He came to Australia in 1879 and worked in Victoria for 12 months as a surveyor. The next year he joined The Age in Melbourne as a journalist; he married Elizabeth Jane Letcher on 26 June 1882. In 1883 he joined the South Australian Register, "and with Thomas Harry formed a partnership as public shorthand writers in 1885."

== Western Australia ==
In 1886, Lovekin was a senior reporter on the Fremantle Herald: "the colony's first radical newspaper", according to the Australian Dictionary of Biography. The Herald was absorbed by the owners of a rival newspaper, Daily News, and in 1890, Lovekin became company secretary and director. In 1893, in England, he bought machinery which enabled Daily News to install the first rotary printing press and Linotype typesetting machines in Western Australia. By 1894, he was managing director and editor of Daily News. In 1896, Lovekin launched the Morning Herald in competition with John Winthrop Hackett's The West Australian. He provoked Australia's first newspaper strike in 1912, when he rejected a claim from Daily News journalists for equal pay with West Australian journalists. The strike lasted a week before Lovekin granted the claim. In 1916, he became sole owner of the Daily News. By the end of World War I, he was very wealthy thanks to stockpiles of newsprint he sold to newspapers affected by wartime shortages. Lovekin sold the Daily News to News Ltd for £86,000 in 1926 (equivalent to $8,000,000 in 2022).

== Politics ==
In the 1890s Lovekin and Hackett, and Alexander and David Forrest, were regular attendees at Sunday morning discussions at the home of Sir John Forrest.

... much government policy resulted—with, not surprisingly, support from the Perth press. Lovekin was a patriotic Western Australian and crusader for development, based on an expanding rural economy and the fashioning of a beautiful city: like Hackett, he was a substantial benefactor to Perth.

During World War I Lovekin helped organise the conscription campaign in 1916, and "matched the 'King's Shilling' with his own", according to the Australian Dictionary of Biography. From 1919 to 1931 Lovekin was a member of the Legislative Council for the Metropolitan Province.

== Kings Park ==
Lovekin Drive

In 1893 Lovekin was a foundation member of the Kings Park honorary committee, which became the King's Park Board in 1896 (and now known as Botanic Gardens and Parks Authority). In 1918 he became president for 13 years until his death.

It was Lovekin's idea to honour WA's war dead by planting rows of commemorative trees in the park. His initiative was based on the Avenue of Honour in Ballarat, Victoria. In 1920 Lovekin and board member Sir William Loton each donated £500 to clear and plant Forrest Avenue with sugar gums. Forrest Avenue was renamed Lovekin Drive after his death.

== Other interests ==
Lovekin was a chairman of the Children's Hospital board of management, helped set up the Perth Children's Court (and served on its bench for nearly 20 years), and was interested in economics, amateur theatre, cricket and cycling. He established the Arthur Lovekin Prize in Journalism in 1928.
