= James Hickey (Australian politician) =

Australian trade unionist and politician

The Honourable James Hickey

Member of the Legislative Council of Western Australia
- In office 22 May 1916 – 21 May 1928
- Preceded by: William Patrick
- Succeeded by: Edmund Hall
- Constituency: Central Province

Personal details
- Born: 14 January 1878 Clunes, Victoria, Australia
- Died: 8 April 1932 (aged 54) Mount Lawley, Western Australia, Australia
- Party: Labor

James William Hickey (14 January 1878 – 8 April 1932) was an Australian trade unionist and politician who was a Labor Party member of the Legislative Council of Western Australia from 1916 to 1928, representing Central Province. He was a minister in the first government of Philip Collier.

Hickey was born in Clunes, Victoria, to Annie Agnes (née Baker) and William Francis Hickey. He came to Western Australia to work on the Murchison goldfields. Hickey became an organiser for the Australian Workers' Union, eventually becoming vice-president of its Geraldton branch. He was also a director of the Westralian Worker, a labour journal. Hickey first ran for parliament at the 1914 Legislative Council elections, but lost to Henry Carson of the Country Party. He ran again in 1916 and was successful, defeating another Country candidate, William Patrick. He was re-elected in 1922. After Labor's victory at the 1924 state election, Hickey was made a minister without portfolio in the new Collier government. However, he was defeated by the Country Party's Edmund Hall at the 1928 election. He stood for the Legislative Assembly at the 1930 state election, but lost to Edward Angelo in the seat of Gascoyne. Hickey died in Perth in April 1932, aged 54. He had married Clarice Evelyn Page in 1911, with whom he had three children.
