= George Miles (politician) =

Australian politician (1873–1952)

George James Gallup Warden Miles (8 May 1873 in Fremantle, Western Australia – 29 June 1952 in Perth, Western Australia) was a long serving independent member of the Western Australian Legislative Council.

Miles participated in the Western Australian gold rushes of the 1890s and settled at Marble Bar, Western Australia, where he became interested in politics and the development of the North-West. He married his wife Nellie in 1906. He was a member of the Marble Bar Road Board from 1906 to 1918 and its chairman from 1909 to 1916.

In 1916 Miles was elected to the Legislative Council as an Independent member for the North Province. He held this position for 33 years, until Labor's Harry Strickland succeeded him in 1950. During the early part of his political life Miles urged the establishment of the now disbanded Port Hedland-Marble Bar railway and the mining of iron ore from Cockatoo Island, Yampi Sound. For many years Miles was a member of the Western Australian Cricket Association (WACA) and was its president from 1939 to 1951.

His great niece Jo Vallentine served as a Senator for Western Australia and his great-granddaughter Mary Jo Fisher served as a Senator for South Australia.
