= James Macfarlane (Western Australian politician) =

Western Australian politician

James Mortimer Macfarlane (12 October 1865 – 16 May 1942) was a Western Australian politician and businessman. He was a prominent figure in the development of the state's butter industry, former member of the Perth City Council, and member of the Western Australian Legislative Council.

== Early life ==
James Macfarlane was born in Oakleigh, Victoria, on 12 October 1865 to farmer Robert Macfarlane and his wife Elizabeth. He was educated in Victoria, and was engaged in mining prior to 1897, in which year he came to Western Australia. Three years later he returned to Victoria, but in 1902 relocated once again to Western Australia.

== Businesses and organisations ==
Macfarlane formed Bacchus Marsh Concentrate Milk Co in Melbourne in the 1890s. In Western Australia he founded the firm of Macfarlane and Co, Ltd, and became associated prominently with the milk and butter industry. In 1902 he obtained a lease of a butter factory at Busselton.

In 1910 Macfarlane was appointed by the Government as a commercial member of the Food Standards Committee, set up under the Pure Foods Act. He advocated in the eastern states for recognition of Western Australia's dairy industry when an Australian dairy organisation was being developed. He was chairman of the West Australian committee of the Australian Dairy Council until it ceased to function in 1935. Macfarlane then became chairman of the West Australian Pasture Improvement Committee of the Australian Dairy Produce Board, retaining that post until he retired in 1940.

Macfarlane was treasurer of the War Patriotic Fund, which collected and distributed £129,000 among soldiers during World War II. He was also a president of the Royal Agricultural Society, and vice-patron of the Royal Life Saving Society of Western Australia, having been a member for over 30 years. Additionally, Macfarlane was the chairman of the executive of the Soldiers' Dependants' appeal.

== Politics ==
Macfarlane became a member of the Perth City Council in 1915, and served until 1922. Six years later he unsuccessfully contested the council mayoral position.

Macfarlane was elected to the Legislative Council as member for the Metropolitan Province in 1922. In 1928 he failed to gain re-election, but two years later was again elected to the Legislative Council as member for the Metropolitan-Suburban Province. He served as a member of the National Party of Western Australia, and in 1930 became president of that party.

== Family ==
Macfarlane married Ellen Eliza Howie on 13 May 1889 at The Manse in South Melbourne. They had no children together, and he was widowed on 16 July 1911.

On 4 December 1912, Macfarlane married Jane Whyte (née Bellamy) in St Andrews Church, Perth, and became a stepfather to her son and two daughters. Jane died on 25 September 1940.

== Death ==
Macfarlane died on 16 May 1942, at his home in Flay Street, West Perth. At about 10:20pm, he went to bed and asked for a glass of water; when it was brought to him, he was found dead from what appeared to be a heart attack.

Macfarlane's funeral was held at Karrakatta Cemetery, where he was buried, on 19 May 1942.
