= Harry Boan =

Australian politician and businessman

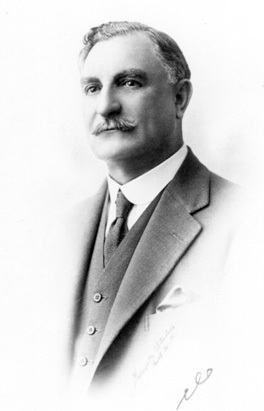
Harry Boan

Henry Boan (1860–1941) was an Australian businessman and politician, who was best known for establishing the Boans department store in Perth, Western Australia.

Boan was born at Jones Creek near Dunolly, Victoria on 4 November 1860. He was the son of English born Jewish parents Thomas, a miner and road contractor, and Rachel Isaacs. Thomas and Rachel had previously lived in California before coming to Australia in about 1850 in relatively poor circumstances. When Harry was about 16 he left home and worked as a messenger in Flegeltaub's Ballarat warehouse on wages of 10s. per week including lodging. He was later promoted to a position of town-traveller at £2 10s. per week but soon resigned. From here he moved between jobs in Melbourne and later Sydney, Brisbane, Toowoomba and Charters Towers including positions at 'Anthony Hordern's' and 'David Jones's'.

== Broken Hill ==
In 1886, his parents gave Henry and his brother Ernest, £200 of their savings which the brothers used to open a business called 'Boan Bros Ltd' in Broken Hill in western New South Wales in 1890. The business expanded rapidly and soon became the leading drapery in the prosperous town. However, by the mid-1890s Broken Hill was suffering a downturn, and in 1895 Harry sold his share of the business to Ernest.

== Perth ==
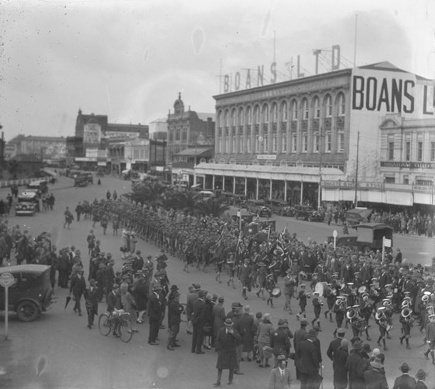
Boans Ltd. Department Store, c. 1927–29.

Harry and another brother Benjamin moved to Perth, which was undergoing an economic boom with gold discoveries around Coolgardie and Kalgoorlie. The brothers purchased a site on the edge of the city which was directly opposite the Perth railway station. They borrowed £62,000 and within a few months had built and opened a single-storey emporium on the site and named it 'Boans Bros.'. The store opened on 7 November 1895 with spectacular results, almost selling out.

On 17 June 1896, Harry married Sophie Bebarfald (born 1868). They would have four children.

Benjamin died in 1901 and in 1910 Harry bought land adjoining the Boans site so that his holdings now comprised a large single block between Wellington and Murray Streets, near Forrest Place. He travelled to Europe and America to research marketing ideas and in about 1913 his wife and children settled in England. Boan returned to Perth, living alone in Perth hotels.

On 14 April 1917 Boan was elected unopposed as a member for the Metropolitan Province in the Western Australian Legislative Council for the Nationalists. In February the following year however, he resigned from parliament after he was criticised for allowing the State Savings Bank (which was taken over in 1931 by the Commonwealth Bank) to open a branch in his store. The store was floated as a limited company shortly after and he moved to England, living there between 1918 and 1920. Boan returned to Perth in about 1920 and was re-elected to the Legislative Council in November 1922; he did not renominate in 1924.

After his retirement from politics, Boan's consuming passion was horse-racing and hunting. He established a successful racing stud which produced many winners and which won the 1910 AJC Derby with 'Tanami'. Other successful horses included 'Maltfield' and 'Maltblossom'.

He served as president of the board of the Children's Hospital and made frequent generous donations. In late 1929, Boan handed control of the Boans store to his son Frank Boan who had returned from England and by about 1932, Harry resettled in Melbourne near a brother and sister. He died at Caulfield of chronic heart and kidney conditions on 18 March 1941. Harry Boan is buried in Karrakatta Cemetery, Perth.

The Boans department store in Wellington Street Perth was subject to a major fire in 1979, which closed the store for some weeks. The store reopened, prior to its closure in 1986 when it was sold to Coles Myer Ltd to make way for the new Forrest Chase Myer complex. This was later considered as somewhat ironic, as the Boans department store in Morley, was destroyed by fire in 1986. The Morley complex was later rebuilt, housing a Myer department store.

The iconic Boans store finally closed on 12 April 1986 after the property was purchased by the Myer Group to make way for a $60 million site redevelopment. The footbridge over Wellington Street between the Perth City Train Station and Myer was named the Harry Boan Footbridge by Landgate's Geographic Names Committee in 1988.
