= Archibald Sanderson =

Australian politician and journalist

Archibald Sanderson (1 April 1870 – 18 June 1937) was an Australian politician and journalist.

Born at Glenthompson in Victoria to pastoralist John Sanderson and Agnes Roberts, he attended Haileybury College and Christ Church, Oxford (graduating in 1892) after the family's move to England before travelling to New Zealand to work as a parliamentary reporter for the Christchurch Press and the Wellington Evening Press. In 1895 he moved to Western Australia and joined the Perth Morning Herald. In 1897 he began establishing a rural retreat and fruit-growing property in the Darling Scarp which he named Lesmurdie after Lesmurdie Cottage, a shooting box near Dufftown, Scotland that his father had rented; the area of his property is now a suburb of Perth. He studied law from 1903, being called to the English Bar in 1906 and the Western Australian equivalent in 1907. He married Maude Louisa Rose Parry in 1906. In 1911 he was first president of the Western Australian Liberal Club, and in 1912 was elected to the Western Australian Legislative Council as a Liberal member, where he advocated laissez-faire economic policies and occasionally supported Labor legislation. Although he had been an opponent of Federation, he also opposed the secession movement. He joined the Country Party and ran on its Senate ticket in 1922. Sanderson died in 1937.
