= John Nicholson (Western Australian politician) =

Australian politician

John Nicholson, OBE (2 November 1867 – 16 September 1941) was a lawyer and politician in Western Australia. Born in Partick, Glasgow, Scotland, he travelled to WA in 1896. Nicholson was a Perth City Councillor from 1901 to 1914, and was the mayor in 1915. On 23 March 1918 he was elected as a member of the Western Australia Legislative Council, representing the Metropolitan Province until his death on 16 September 1941.
