= Athelstan Saw =

Western Australian politician and university administrator

Athelstan John Henton Saw OBE (16 July 1868 – 28 November 1929), was a Western Australian politician and university administrator.

== Biography ==
Saw was born in Perth, Western Australia, the son of merchant Henry Saw, and studied at Perth High School and Trinity College, Cambridge, where he graduated with a Master of Arts. He subsequently gained a Bachelor of Medicine and was elected a Fellow of the Royal College of Surgeons. In 1895 he was appointed honorary surgeon to the Perth Hospital.

In 1915 Saw was first elected unopposed for the Liberal Party to the Legislative Council for the Metropolitan-Suburban Province, retaining his seat for 14 years. He was Honorary Minister in the Wilson government when he enlisted for war duty. Saw held the rank of lieutenant colonel in the Australian Army Medical Corps as senior surgeon at the 14th Australian Garrison Hospital.

Saw played a distinguished part in the formation of the University of Western Australia. He became a member of its original Senate in 1912, and succeeded the late Archbishop Charles Riley as the Chancellor in 1921. He bequeathed a substantial sum of money to the University of Western Australia to endow the "Athelstan and Amy Saw Medical Research Fellowship"

On 17 April 1895 he married Amy Enid Staples (13 August 1870 – 23 May 1950), daughter of Dr. J. H. P. Staples. She helped found the university's women's college, which was a beneficiary of her will. Their home was at 242 St Georges Terrace, Perth, then in Darlington.

== Honours and awards ==
In 1918, when occupying the rank of lieutenant-colonel, Saw was mentioned in dispatches. In 1918 he was appointed an officer of the Order of the British Empire.

Academic offices
Preceded by Most Rev. Charles Riley	Chancellor of the University of Western Australia; 1922 – 1929	Succeeded by Sir Walter James
