= List of cemeteries in Australia =

This is a list of cemeteries in Australia.

== Australian Capital Territory ==
- Gungahlin Cemetery, Mitchell, ACT
- Hall Cemetery
- St John the Baptist Church, Reid
- Woden Cemetery

== Australian island territories ==
=== Cocos (Keeling) Islands ===
- Early Settlers' Graves, Home Island
- Home Island Cemetery

=== Christmas Island ===
- Christmas Island Cemetery

=== Heard Island ===
- historic sealers cemetery

=== Macquarie Island ===
- Isolated burials

=== Norfolk Island ===
- Norfolk Island Cemetery, Kingston

== New South Wales ==
=== Blue Mountains ===
  - Blackheath
  - Faulconbridge
  - Katoomba
  - Kurrajong
  - Lawson
  - Megalong Valley
  - Mount Irvine
  - Mount Victoria
  - Mount Wilson
  - Wentworth Falls

=== Central Coast ===
  - Bradys Gully
  - Catherine Hill Bay
  - Cooranbong
  - Frosts Rest
  - Helys Grave
  - Jilliby
  - Kincumber South
  - Kincumber – St Pauls
  - Lisarow
  - Martinsville
  - Morisset
  - Point Clare
  - Point Frederick
  - Ronkana
  - Veteran Hall
  - Wamberal
  - Woongarrah
  - Wyee
  - Wyee Bethshan

=== Greater West ===
  - Bowenfels
  - South Bowenfels
  - Moyne Farm, Lithgow

=== Hunter Region ===
  - Maitland Jewish Cemetery
  - Sandgate Cemetery

=== Illawarra Region ===
  - Berkeley Pioneer
  - Bulli Anglican Churchyard
  - Bulli Cemetery
  - Coniston Cemetery
  - Helensburgh
  - Mount Kembla Miners Memorial
  - Waterfall
  - Windy Gully
  - Wollongong - Andrew Lysaght Park
  - Wollongong Lawn Cemetery
  - Wollongong Memorial Park

=== Lord Howe Island ===
- Main cemetery
- Pinetrees cemetery
- Thompson Family Cemetery

=== Macarthur Region ===
  - Camden
  - Greendale Anglican
  - Greendale Catholic
  - Mulgoa
  - Picton

=== Sydney ===
  - Badgerys Creek – 2 cleared
  - Balmain Cemetery
  - Balmain Catholic Cemetery
  - Botany, Pioneer Memorial Park
  - Brooklyn Cemetery
  - Camperdown Cemetery
  - Castlebrook Memorial Park, Rouse Hill
  - Crows Nest, St Thomas Rest Park
  - Devonshire Street Cemetery
  - Eastern Suburbs Memorial Park – Incorporates Botany Cemetery, Eastern Suburbs Crematorium and Pioneer Park (where headstones from early Sydney burial grounds have been relocated).
  - Field of Mars Cemetery – Ryde, it was proclaimed on 3 December 1887 and opened for burials in 1890. Famous interments include: Herbert Hepburn Calvert (artist) and Rita Hunter (opera singer).
  - Gordon – St Johns Anglican Church and Cemetery
  - Gore Hill, Gore Hill Cemetery – Operated from 1864 to 1974.
  - Little Bay, Coast Hospital Cemetery
  - Liverpool
  - Macquarie Park Cemetery and Crematorium – North Ryde
  - Matraville, Eastern Suburbs Memorial Park
  - North Parramatta, St Patrick's Cemetery, North Parramatta – Oldest Catholic cemetery in Australia (1824)
  - Northern Suburbs Memorial Gardens – North Ryde
  - Old Sydney Burial Ground
  - Parramatta, St John's Cemetery, Parramatta – Australia's oldest surviving European cemetery (1790)
  - Petersham Cemetery
  - Pine Grove Memorial Park
  - Randwick, St Jude's Anglican Cemetery
  - Richmond
  - Rookwood Cemetery, – Proper name 'The Necropolis, Rookwood" at over 2.8 km^{2}, reputedly the largest necropolis in the Southern Hemisphere if not the world, first used in 1867. More than 1,000,000 interments.
  - Ryde – St Annes
  - South Coogee, Randwick General Cemetery
  - St Peters, St Peters Church, St Peters and cemetery
  - Vaucluse, South Head Cemetery
  - Waverley Cemetery, (Sydney) – Opened in 1877. Dramatic location on picturesque coastal site, many local historical figures such as writer Henry Lawson. 50,000 allotments.
  - Windsor

=== Southern Highlands (New South Wales) ===
  - Goulburn
    - Old Goulburn
    - Jewish
  - Gundaroo Catholic Pioneer Cemetery
  - Marulan Anglican
  - Marulan Catholic
  - Michelago Cemetery
  - Penrose
  - Queanbeyan Lawn Cemetery
  - Riverside Cemetery, Queanbeyan
  - Taralga
  - Welby
- Wagga Wagga War Cemetery

== Northern Territory ==
- Adelaide River War Cemetery
- Elsey Cemetery

=== Alice Springs ===
- Alice Springs Cemetery
- Alice Springs Pioneer Cemetery or Stuart Town Cemetery

=== Darwin ===
- Darwin Chinese Memorial Cemetery
- Darwin General Cemetery
- Darwin Pioneer Cemetery (1865–1919)
- Gardens Cemetery
- Thorak Regional Cemetery

== Queensland ==
=== Brisbane City ===
- Balmoral Cemetery, Brisbane—also known as Bulimba Cemetery and (historically) Kangaroo Point Cemetery
- First Brisbane Burial Ground, also known as the Skew Street Cemetery
- Francis Lookout, a private cemetery at Corinda
- God's Acre Cemetery, Archerfield
- Lutwyche Cemetery, Kedron
- Mount Gravatt Cemetery and Crematorium, Nathan
- Mount Thompson Crematorium, Queensland's first crematorium
- North Brisbane Burial Ground, also known as Paddington Cemetery, Milton Cemetery, now redeveloped as Lang Park
- Nudgee Cemetery & Crematorium
- Nundah Cemetery – Formerly known as German Station Cemetery
- Pinnaroo Cemetery and Crematorium, Brisbane
- South Brisbane Cemetery – also known as Dutton Park Cemetery
- St Matthews Anglican Church, Grovely
- The Gap Uniting (formerly Methodist) Church Cemetery & Columbarium Wall, The Gap
- Toowong Cemetery, Brisbane – Proper name "The Brisbane General Cemetery" the oldest existing and largest Brisbane cemetery. Opened in 1875. Resting place of author Steele Rudd.

=== Croydon Shire ===
- Croydon Cemetery
- Old Croydon Cemetery
- Station Creek Cemetery
- Tabletop Cemetery

=== Logan City ===
- Bethania Lutheran Church
- Carbrook Lutheran Cemetery
- Kingston Pioneer Cemetery
- Old St Mark's Anglican Church, Daisy Hill (formerly Slacks Creek)

=== Redland City ===
- Cleveland Pioneer Cemetery
- Dunwich Cemetery

Toowoomba Region

- Allora Cemetery
- Drayton and Toowoomba Cemetery

=== Whitsunday Region ===
- Flemington Road Cemetery, Bowen
- Collinsville Cemetery
- Proserpine Cemetery

=== Others ===
- Cooktown Cemetery, Shire of Cook
- Cressbrook Cemetery, Evelyn, Tablelands Region
- Garners Beach Burial Ground, Cassowary Coast Region
- Gympie Cemetery, Gympie Region
- Ipswich General Cemetery, City of Ipswich
- Joskeleigh Cemetery, Joskeleigh, Shire of Livingstone
- Mackay General Cemetery, Mackay Region
- Maryborough Cemetery, Fraser Coast Region
- McLeod Street Pioneer Cemetery, Cairns, Cairns Region
- Mill Point Cemetery, Shire of Noosa
- St Patrick's Church, Rosevale, Scenic Rim Region
- South Rockhampton Cemetery, Rockhampton Region
- Thursday Island Cemetery, Shire of Torres
- Warwick General Cemetery, Southern Downs Region
- West End Cemetery, Townsville, City of Townsville

== South Australia ==
- Adelaide Cemeteries Authority:
  - Cheltenham Cemetery (and Cheltenham Mausoleum), Cheltenham
  - Enfield Memorial Park (including Enfield Crematorium and Enfield Mausoleum), Clearview
  - Salisbury Memorial Park, Salisbury Downs
  - Smithfield Memorial Park (and Smithfield Mausoleum), Evanston South
  - Walkerville Wesleyan Cemetery, Walkerville
  - West Terrace Cemetery, Adelaide — South Australia's oldest public cemetery.
- Alberton Cemetery, Alberton (Closed)
- Centennial Park Cemetery, Pasadena — Opened in 1936 during South Australia's centenary year.
- Dudley Park Cemetery, Dudley Park
- Hindmarsh Cemetery, Hindmarsh
- Kadina Cemetery, Kadina
- Mitcham Cemetery (General, Anglican and St Joseph's),Mitcham
- Moonta Cemetery, Moonta
- Mount Crawford Cemetery, Mount Crawford
- Mount Gambier
  - Pioneer Park Cemetery
  - Lake Terrace Cemetery
  - Carinya Gardens Cemetery
- North Brighton Cemetery, Somerton Park
- North Road Cemetery, Nailsworth
- Payneham Cemetery, Payneham South
- St Jude's Church Cemetery, Brighton
- St Mary's Anglican Church Graveyard, St Marys
- St Michael's Lutheran Church & Cemetery, Hahndorf
- Willaston General Cemetery, Willaston

== Tasmania ==
- Cambridge Cemetery
- Cornelian Bay Cemetery
- East Risdon Cemetery
- Isle of the Dead – Port Arthur, early convict graves, part of the old gaol and convict reform settlement.
- Kingston Cemetery
- Mornington Memorial Gardens
- Penguin General Cemetery
- Pontville Cemetery
- Queenborough Cemetery – headstones relocated to Queenborough Memorial Garden and Cornelian Bay Cemetery

== Victoria ==
=== Metropolitan Melbourne cemeteries ===
- Altona Memorial Park
- Andersons Creek Cemetery
- Boroondara General Cemetery
- Box Hill Cemetery
- Brighton Cemetery
- Bunurong Memorial Park
- Burwood Cemetery
- Cheltenham Memorial Park
- Cheltenham Pioneer Cemetery
- Coburg Cemetery
- Dandenong Community Cemetery
- Eltham Cemetery
- Emerald Cemetery
- Fawkner Crematorium and Memorial Park
- Footscray General Cemetery
- Frankston Memorial Park
- Greensborough Cemetery
- Hawdon Street Cemetery
- Healesville Cemetery
- Keilor Cemetery
- Lilydale Lawn Cemetery
- Lilydale Memorial Park
- Melbourne General Cemetery
- Mornington Cemetery
- Northcote Cemetery
- Northern Memorial Park
- Oakleigh Pioneer Memorial Park
- Old Melbourne Cemetery
- Preston Cemetery
- Rye Cemetery and Memorial Gardens
- Scots Uniting Church Graveyard, Campbellfield
- Sorrento Cemetery
- Springvale Botanical Cemetery
- St Andrew's Graveyard, Brighton
- St Kilda Cemetery
- St Katherine's Graveyard, St Helena
- Templestowe Cemetery
- Truganina Cemetery
- Warringal Cemetery
- Werribee Cemetery
- Will Will Rook Cemetery
- Williamstown Cemetery
- Yarra Glen Cemetery

=== Country Victorian cemeteries ===
- Aberfeldy Cemetery
- Ararat General Cemetery
- Bacchus Marsh – Maddingley General Cemetery
- Bairnsdale Cemetery
- Ballaarat New Cemetery
- Ballaarat Old Cemetery
- Bendigo
  - Bendigo Cemetery
  - Eaglehawk Cemetery
  - Kangaroo Flat Remembrance Park
  - White Hills Cemetery
- Castlemaine Cemetery
- Geelong Eastern Cemetery
- Geelong Western Cemetery
- Kyneton Cemetery
- Warracknabeal Cemetery
- Wooling Hill Memorial Estate

== Western Australia ==
- East Perth Cemeteries
- Fremantle Cemetery, (Perth) – Opened 1898 south of the Swan River and city of Perth
- Guildford Cemetery, Western Australia
- Karrakatta Cemetery, (Perth) – Opened in 1899 north of the Swan River and closest to the Perth city centre.
- Kenwick Pioneer Cemetery, in the City of Gosnells
- Lakes Lawn Cemetery, Parklands, Mandurah
- Mandurah Cemetery, Mandurah – Closed Dec 1985
- Memorial Park Cemetery (Albany, Western Australia)
- Mundaring Cemetery, in the Shire of Mundaring
- Midland Cemetery
- Parkerville Children's Home bush cemetery, in the Shire of Mundaring
- Pinnaroo Valley Memorial Park, in the Perth suburb of Padbury
- Wooroloo Sanatorium and cemetery, in the Shire of Mundaring
