= Frederick Davis (politician) =

Australian trade unionist, newspaper editor and politician

Frederick Davis MLC

Member of the Western Australian Legislative Council
- In office 2 November 1911 – 21 May 1914
- Preceded by: Sydney Stubbs
- Succeeded by: Joseph Duffell
- Constituency: Metropolitan-Suburban Province

Personal details
- Born: 8 July 1866 Radford, Coventry, England
- Died: 5 February 1950 (aged 83) Midland Junction, Western Australia, Australia
- Resting place: Midland Cemetery
- Party: Labor
- Occupation: Bricklayer, union official, newspaper editor

Frederick Davis (8 July 1866 – 5 February 1950) was an English-born Australian trade unionist, newspaper editor and politician. He was a member of the Western Australian Legislative Council representing the Metropolitan-Suburban Province from his election on 2 November 1911 until the end of his term in 1914. Davis was a member of the Labor Party. Before entering parliament he was secretary of the Perth Trades and Labor Council and founded the Swan Express newspaper at Midland Junction.

== Early life ==
Davis was born on 8 July 1866 at Radford, Coventry, England, the son of John Davis, a stonemason, and his wife Eliza (née Moor). He had come to Australia by the early 1880s and moved to Victoria in 1882. He worked as a bricklayer in the eastern colonies.

== Early career ==
Davis moved to Western Australia in 1893. From 1894 to 1899 he was secretary of the Perth Trades and Labor Council. He was also associated with the Sunday Chronicle during those years. He was secretary of the Eight Hour Day Committee and served on the Leederville Municipal Council.

In 1900 he founded the Swan Express at Midland Junction. He edited the paper until 1909, and then became an orchardist at Greenmount.

== Political career ==
Davis first stood for the Legislative Council at a by-election for the Metropolitan-Suburban Province on 23 March 1910, but lost to Douglas Gawler.

He was elected for the province at another by-election on 2 November 1911. The vacancy was caused by the resignation of Sydney Stubbs, who had moved to the Legislative Assembly as the member for Wagin. A by-election for the province's other vacant seat, caused by the resignation of Joseph Langsford, was held on the same day and won by fellow Labor candidate James Doland.

Davis gave his inaugural speech on 9 November 1911. He disagreed with members who described the Legislative Council as a non-party chamber, and said he had been elected "as a party man" on the Labor platform. He also defended the Arbitration Act against criticism from Matthew Moss, and called for compulsory continuation schools for young people aged 12 to 18.

Davis stood for re-election at the Legislative Council election on 16 May 1914, but lost the seat to the Liberal candidate Joseph Duffell.

== Later life and death ==
By 1916 Davis was secretary of the Midland District Council of the Australian Labor Federation. He also served as president of the Greenmount Progress Association.

Davis never married. He died at St Andrews Hospital in Midland Junction on 5 February 1950, aged 83, and was buried at Midland Cemetery.
