= H. H. Calvert =

Australian painter (1870–1923)

Herbert Hepburn Calvert (1870-1923) was an Australian watercolour artist. He commonly signed his paintings "H. H. Calvert".

== Biography ==
Herbert Hepburn Calvert was born on 30 December 1870 in London. He was the first son of journalist Thomas Calvert and his wife Grace (née Hepburn).

In 1887 the family emigrated to Sydney, Australia where in 1904 H. H. Calvert married Mary Elsie O’Brien.

Calvert was known for his watercolours depicting Australian bird life. He was active from at least 1910 until his death in 1923 and is represented in the collections of the Mitchell Library, State Library of New South Wales and the Art Gallery of New South Wales.

The work of Calvert's younger son, Harold Hepburn Calvert (1906–1963), is often incorrectly attributed to his father. This misidentification is exacerbated by both men having similar names and painting careers which overlapped in the early 1920s. In terms of subject matter, style and medium, Harold's art mirrored that of Herbert, however, the son usually signed his paintings as H. Hep. Calvert or H. Hepburn Calvert which helps differentiate his output.

Calvert died in Adelaide on 16 February 1923 and was subsequently buried at the Field of Mars Cemetery in the Sydney suburb of Ryde. He was survived by his wife and sons Herbert and Harold.

== Gallery ==
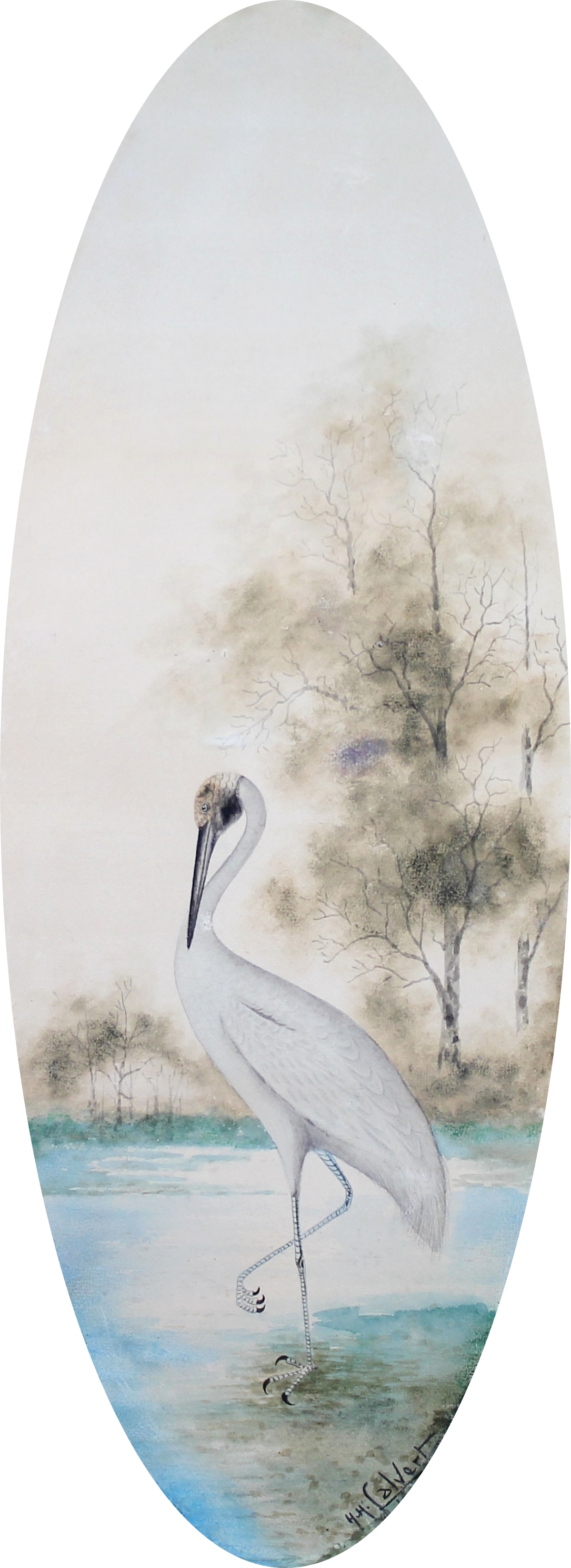
Brolga (1912)

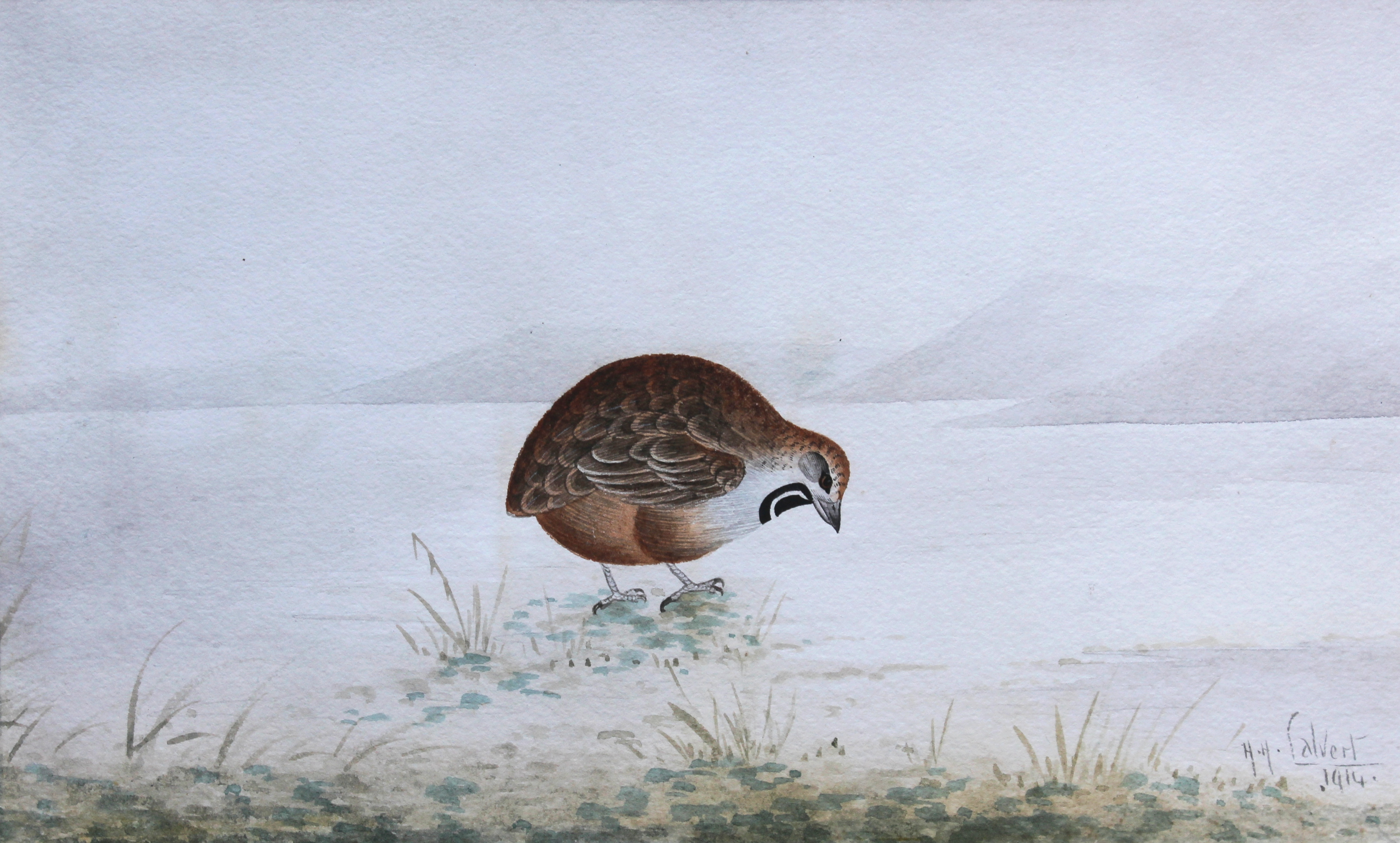
King Quail (1914)

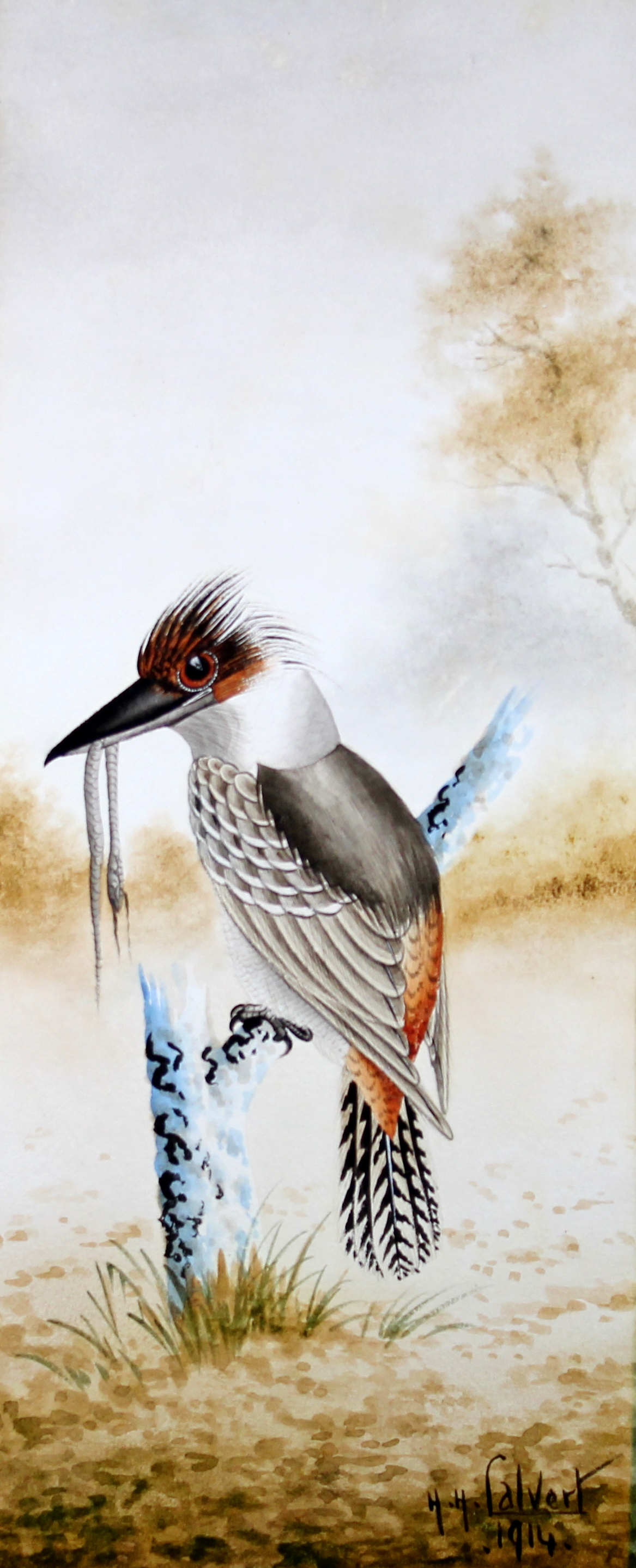
Kookaburra (1914)

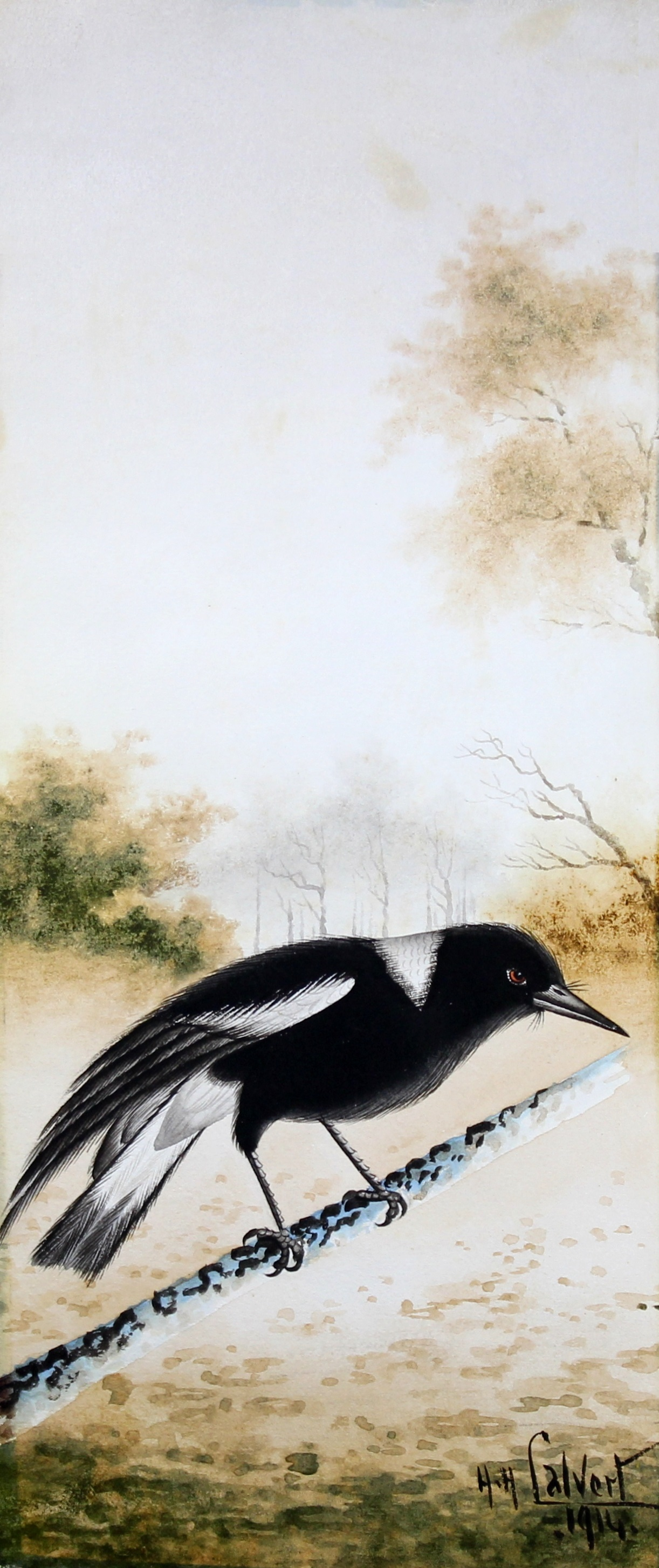
Magpie (1914)

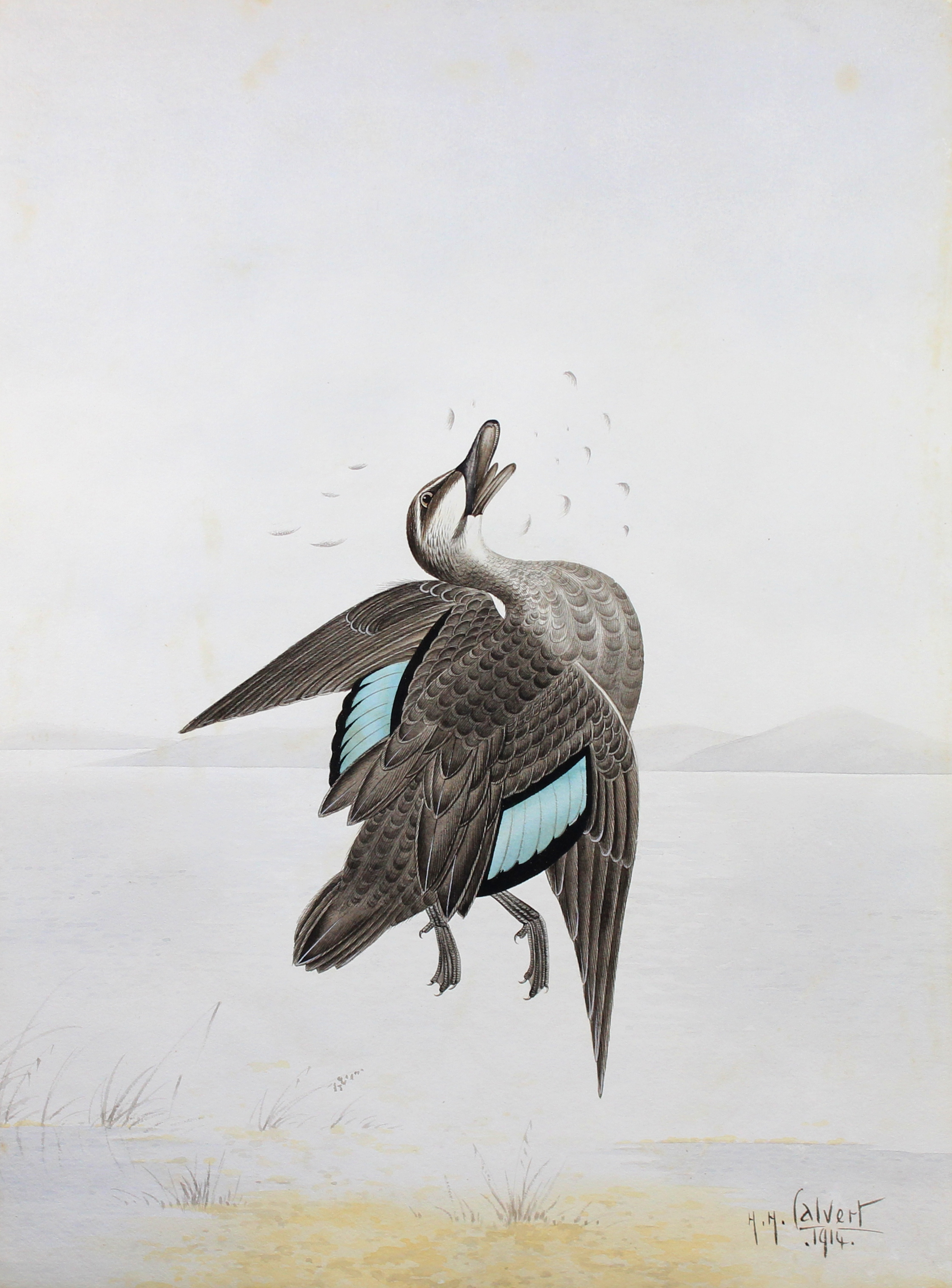
Pacific Black Duck shot in flight (1914)

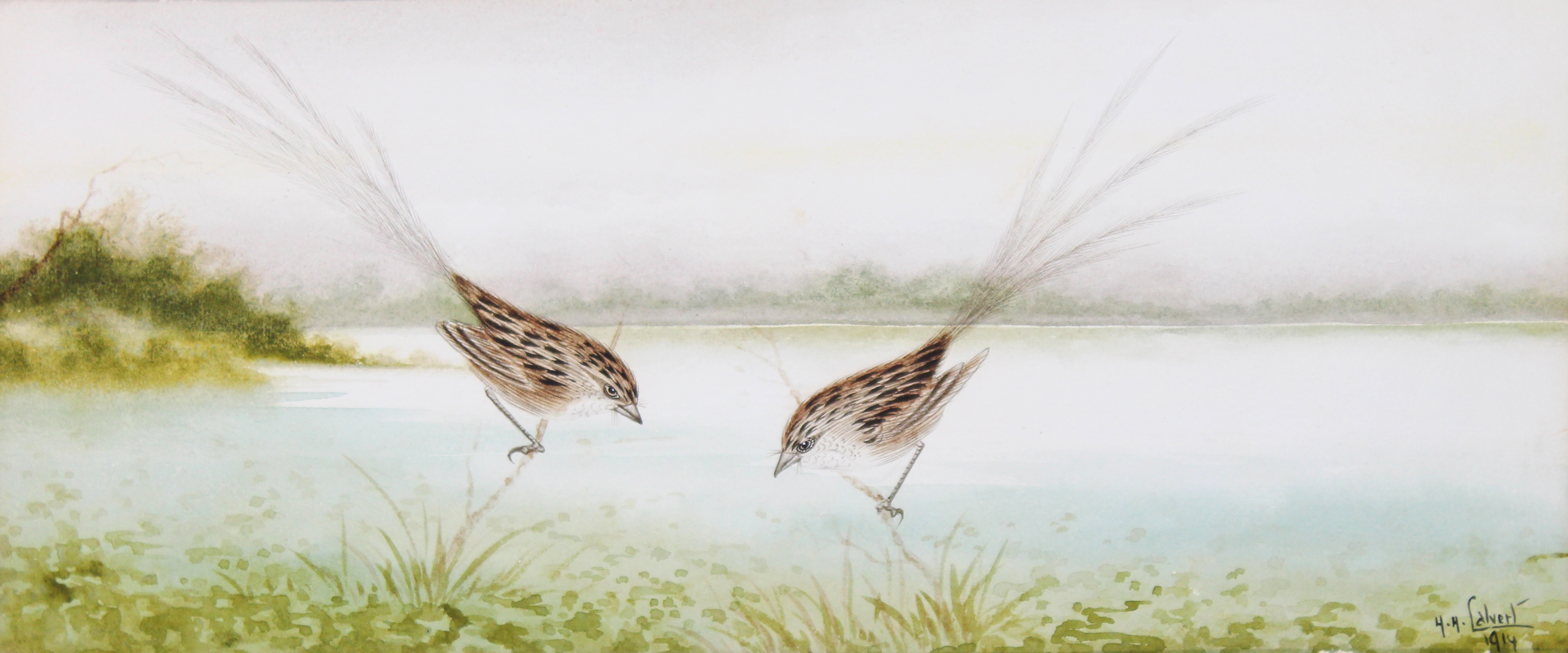
Southern Emu-wrens (1914)

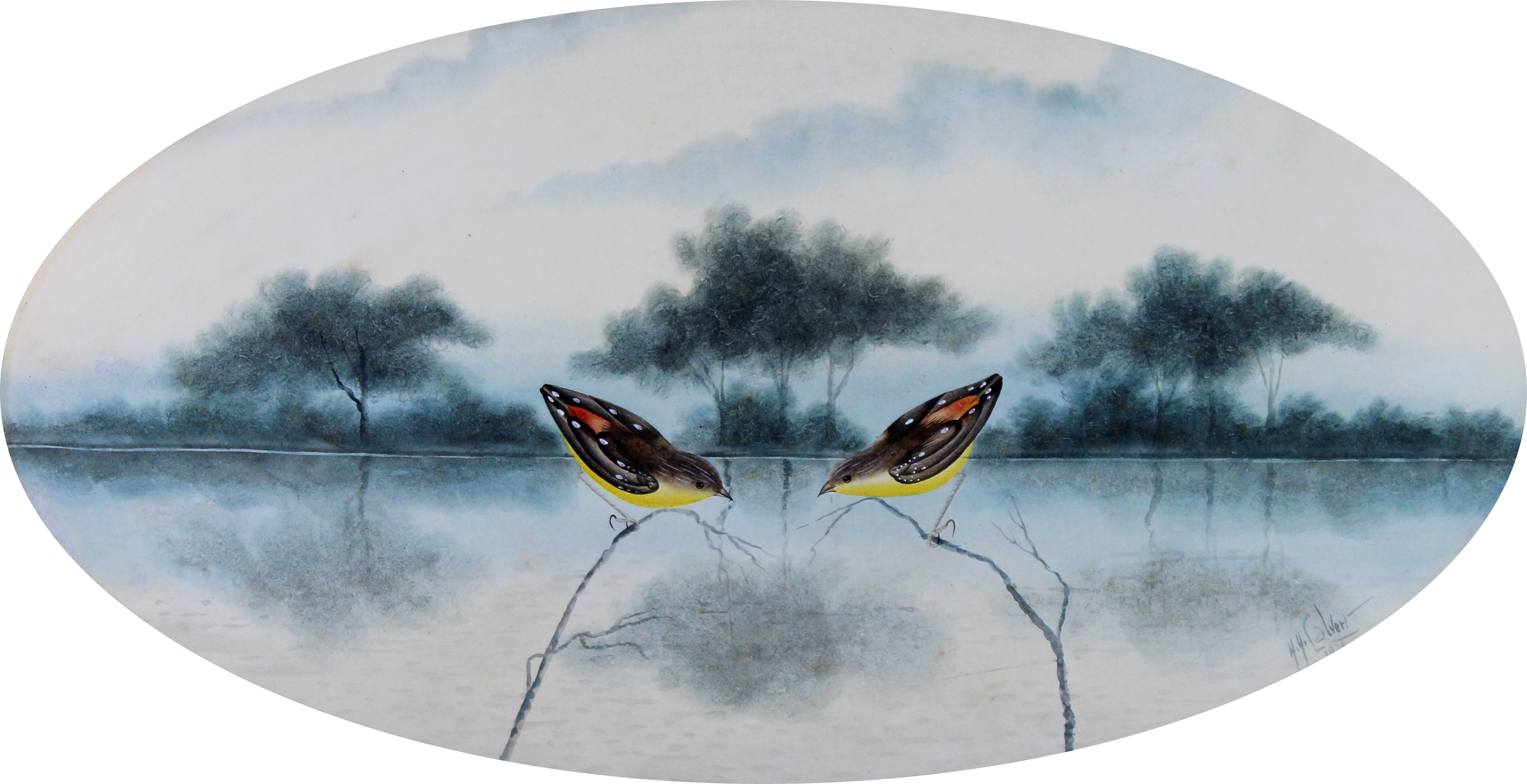
Spotted Pardalotes (1921)

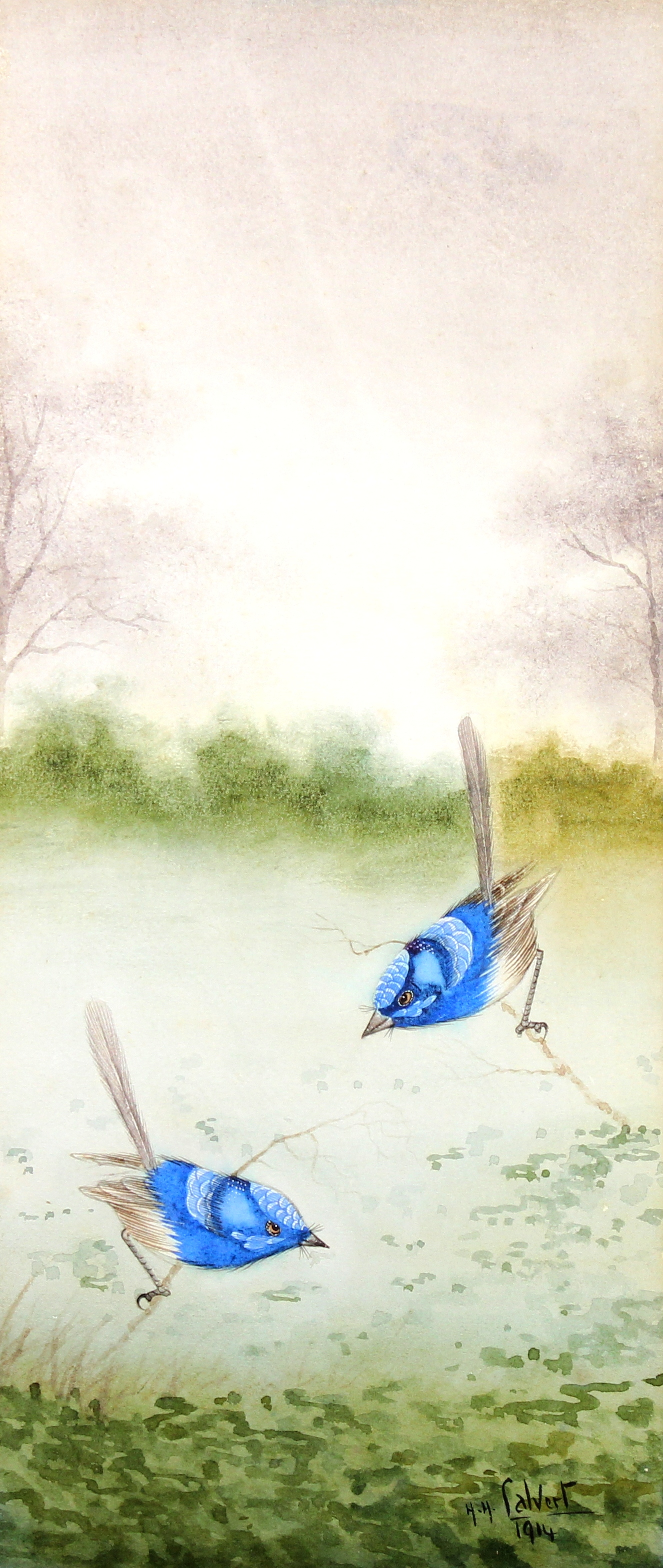
Superb Fairy-wrens (1914)

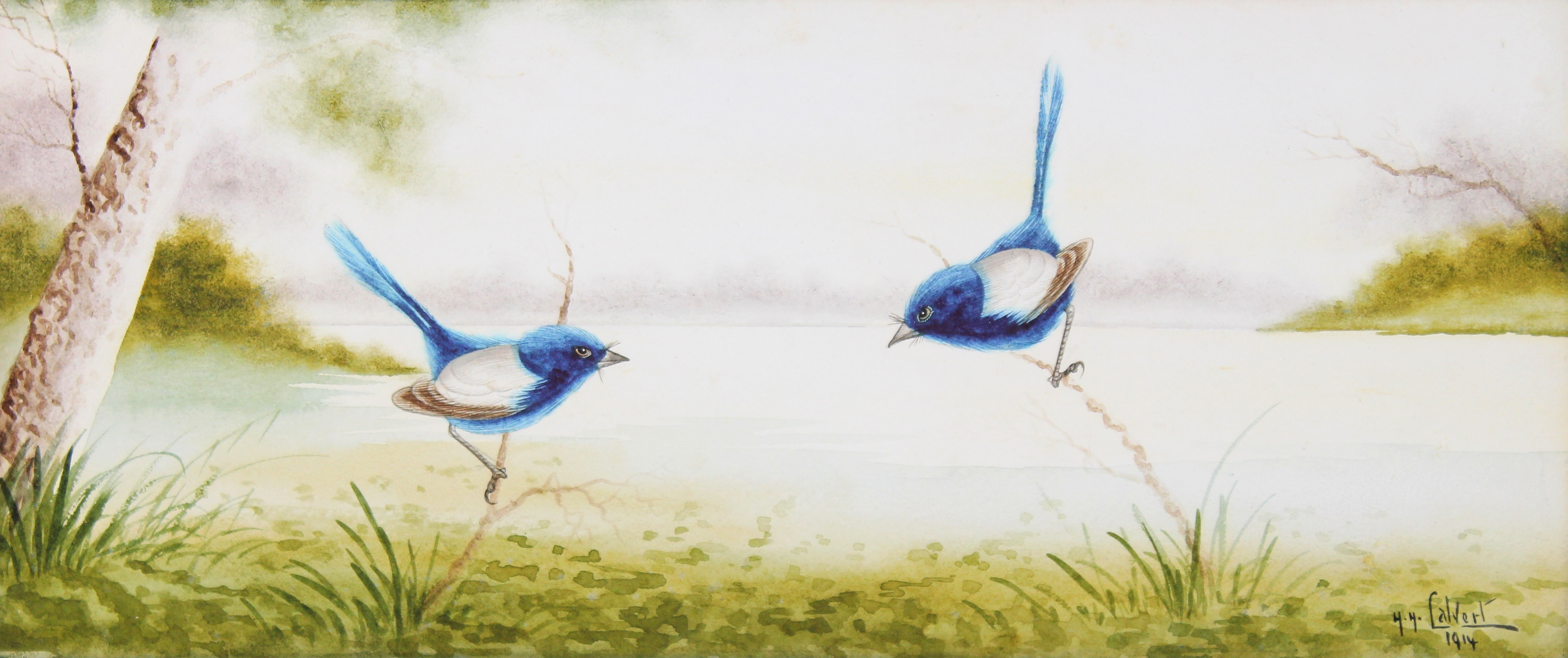
White-winged Fairy-wrens (1914)
