= Swan Express =

Former newspaper in Midland Junction, Western Australia

The Swan Express
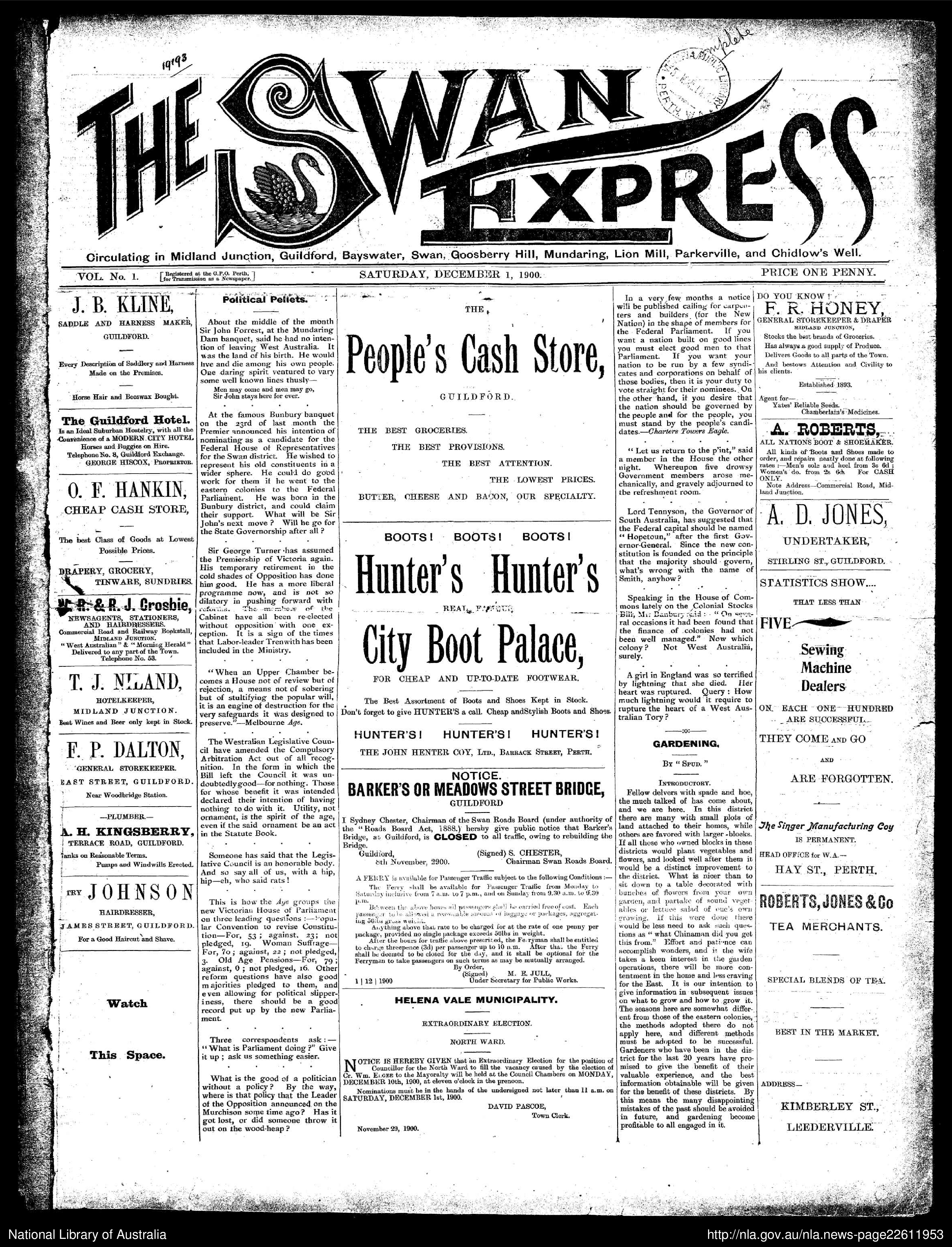
- Founder: Frederick Davis
- Founded: 1900
- Ceased publication: 1979
- Language: English
- City: Midland Junction
- Country: Australia

The Swan Express was a weekly English language newspaper published in Midland, Western Australia.

== History ==
The Swan Express was published from 1 December 1900 until 8 November 1979. It was printed by William Heller at 184 Barrack St, Perth, and published at The Crescent, Midland Junction.

It was established by Frederick Davis, who had previously worked as the second in charge at The Sunday Chronicle. Davis owned and edited the newspaper for 8 and a half years before he sold the business to Herbert James Lambert, who took control on Monday 3 April 1909. Lambert was an experienced journalist and had previously worked as sub-editor at the Morning Herald.

During World War I, Lambert ran the soldiers' camp newspaper, Camp Chronicle: the soldier's paper, and he later went on to become editor of The West Australian.

Camp Chronicle was published at Blackboy Hill army camp, recording the day-to-day events of the camp. The newspaper contained personal paragraphs, anecdotes and matters pertaining to the life of a soldier.

The weekly newspaper served the eastern suburbs of Perth, including Midland (then known as Midland Junction), which in 1900 was a major railway junction.

== Availability ==
Issues of The Swan Express (1900–1954) and the Camp Chronicle (1915–1918) have been digitised as part of the Australian Newspapers Digitisation Program of the National Library of Australia in cooperation with the State Library of Western Australia.

Microfilm and hard copies of The Swan Express and the Camp Chronicle are also available at the State Library of Western Australia.

== See also ==
- List of newspapers in Australia
- List of newspapers in Western Australia
