= Bethania Lutheran Church =

Bethania Lutheran Heritage Church
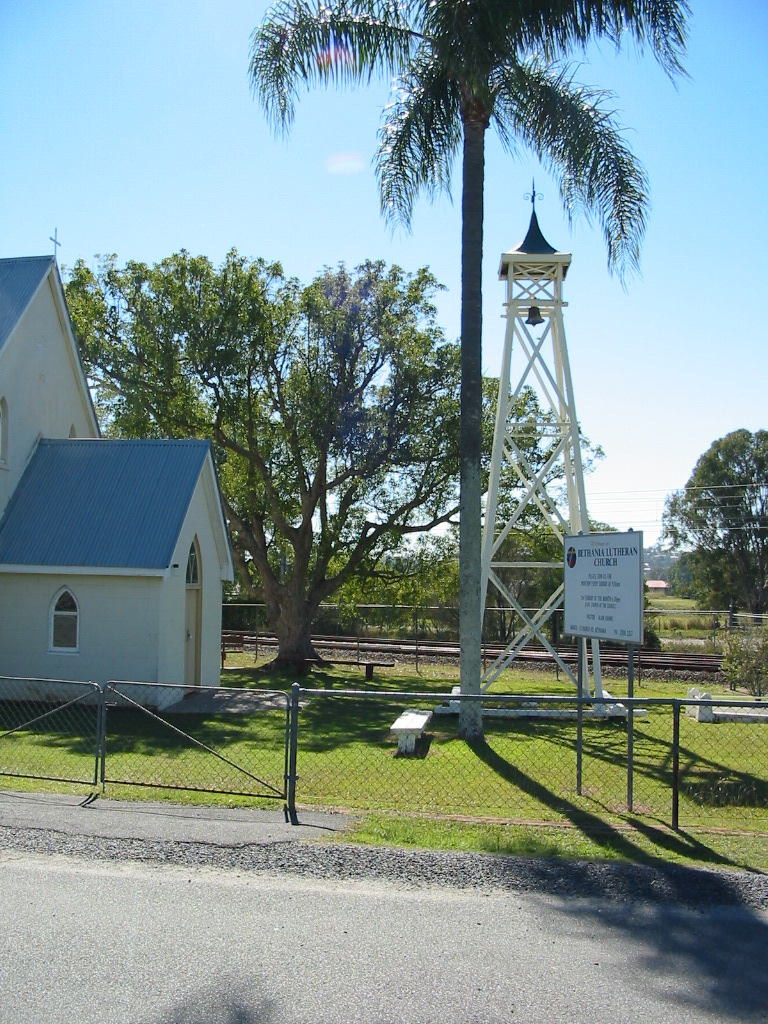
- Bethania Lutheran Church and bell tower, 2005

- Location within Queensland Location within Australia
- 27.6912°S 153.1609°E
- Location: Church Road, Bethania, City of Logan, Queensland, Australia

History
- Design period: 1870s–1890s (late 19th century)
- Built: 1872

Queensland Heritage Register
- Official name: Bethania Lutheran Church
- Type: state heritage (built)
- Designated: 21 October 1992
- Reference no.: 600002
- Significant period: 1866–1872 (fabric)
- Significant components: furniture/fittings, stained glass window/s, graveyard, tower – bell / belfry

Bethania Lutheran Heritage Church is a heritage-listed church at Church Road, Bethania, City of Logan, Queensland, Australia. It was built in 1872 and is the oldest Lutheran church in Queensland. It was added to the Queensland Heritage Register on 21 October 1992.

== History ==
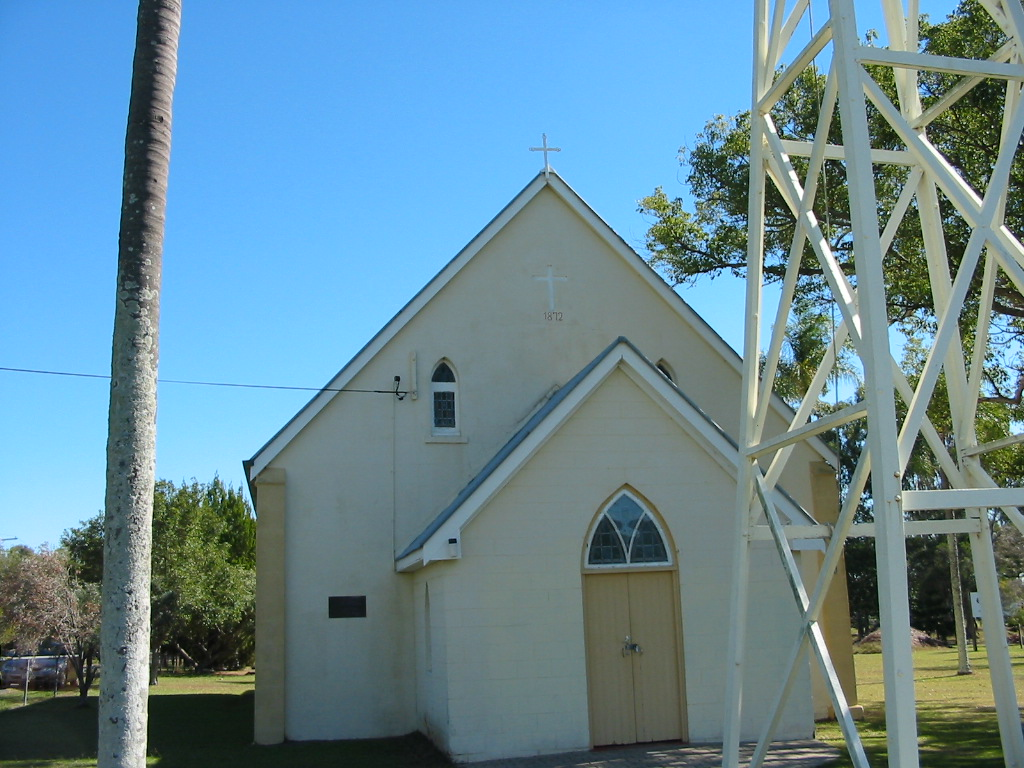
Bethania Lutheran Church, the year of construction 1872 is visible, 2005

The church was built in 1872 from locally sourced handmade bricks, timber and shingles.

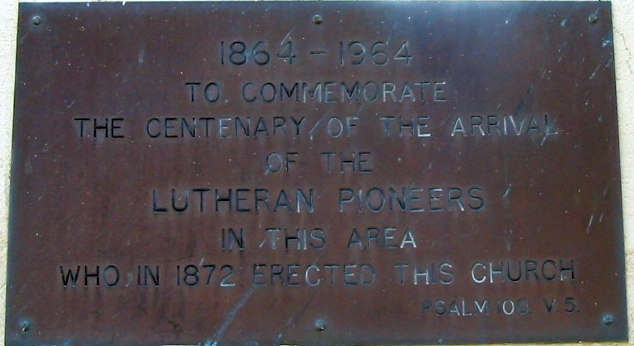
Plaque commemorating the establishment of the congregation in 1864

It replaced an earlier slab church built in 1864 when a group of German immigrants who immigrated on the ship Susannah Godeffroy first settled in the area and gave it the name Bethanien. The graveyard next to the church has graves dating from 1866. In 1875, the railway line was built, passing close to the church and over the site of the earlier building.

The shingle roof was replaced with iron in 1907 and the new pulpit was built in 1926. For the centenary celebrations in 1972 major renovations were undertaken. A new iron roof, a plywood ceiling, new lighting and leadlight windows were installed. The church, although still used, is no longer the major worship centre of the parish.

== Description ==
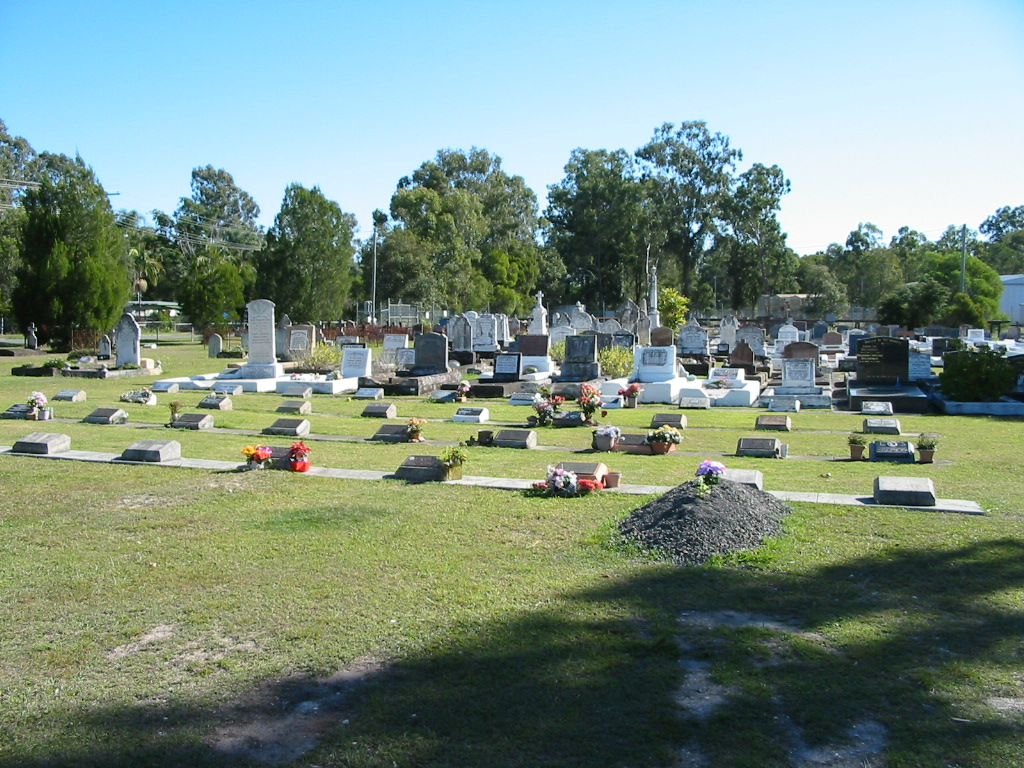
Bethania Lutheran Church cemetery, 2005

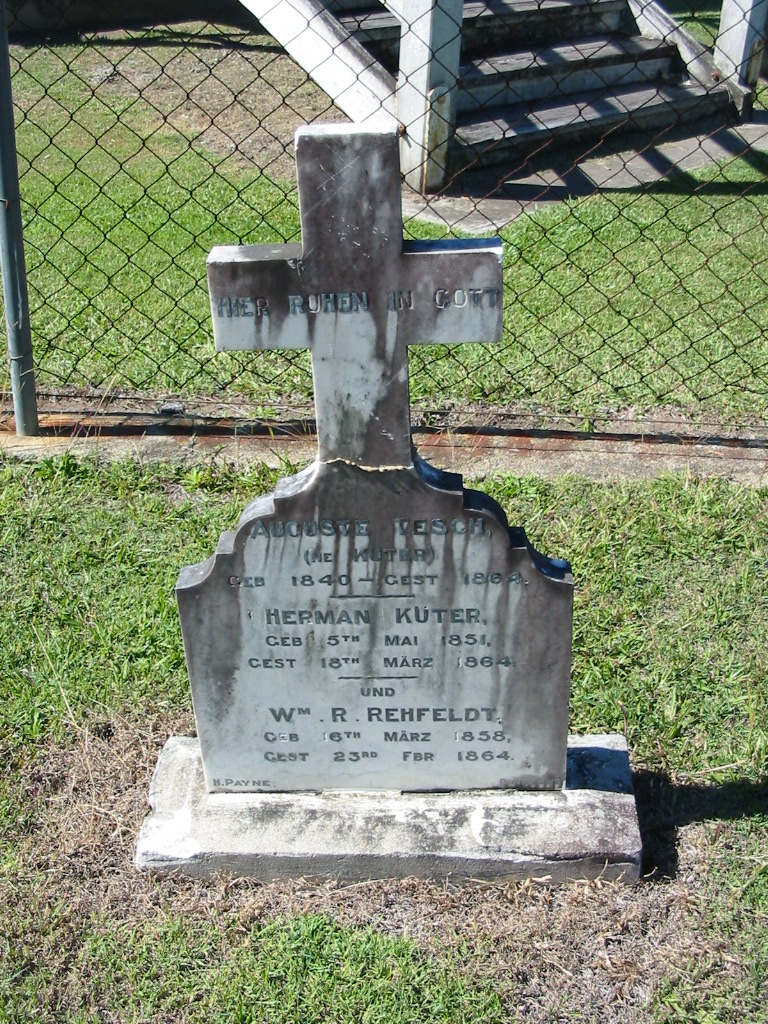
1864 headstone in the cemetery ("gest[orben]" means "d[ied]")

This single storey church is constructed of hand-made bricks, rendered internally and externally and has steep gable roofs sheeted with galvanised corrugated iron. The brick walls are strengthened with engaged brick piers visible externally. The exterior plaster is raked to suggest stone construction.

The original timber bell tower is positioned opposite the entry doors to the church. The Beenleigh railway line runs adjacent to the property and a timber footbridge allows pedestrian access across this line. Several graves established prior to the railway line still exist in front of the church and on the other side of the line. The cemetery is now located at the rear of the church.

The building consists of a rectangular double height nave with square projections at both ends. The gable roofs over the two projecting rooms are lower than the nave roof. At the eastern end is a 1972 concrete block entry vestibule that replaced a timber entry porch. It is rendered to match the rest of the building and has double entry doors located on its eastern face. The original entry doors have been removed. On the western end is a private room that contains the staircase leading to the pulpit.

The pulpit located at the western end of the main space has been built as a balcony above the altar. This arrangement is original but the fabric has been reconstructed.

At the eastern end of this space, over the original entry is a timber mezzanine which has been extended to twice its original size. The mezzanine is reached by a steep timber staircase. The raked ceiling has a plywood lining that replaced painted sheet metal. Two steel tie rods connect the roof structure above the wall level.

The church has tall pointed arched windows in the side walls. Stained glass hopper windows replaced the original casement windows in 1972. The end walls and the attached vestibules have small pointed arched windows.

The church has suffered some alterations. Fabric has been replaced but the original forms have been maintained.

== Heritage listing ==
Bethania Lutheran Church was listed on the Queensland Heritage Register on 21 October 1992 having satisfied the following criteria.

The place is important in demonstrating the evolution or pattern of Queensland's history.

Bethania Lutheran Church is significant for its association with the German settlers and the continuing association with the Lutheran community in the area.

The place demonstrates rare, uncommon or endangered aspects of Queensland's cultural heritage.

Bethania Lutheran Church is significant as the oldest Lutheran Church in Queensland.

The place is important in demonstrating a high degree of creative or technical achievement at a particular period.

Bethania Lutheran Church shows evidence of handmade materials and rudimentary construction techniques used by the area's pioneers.
