= Joskeleigh Cemetery =

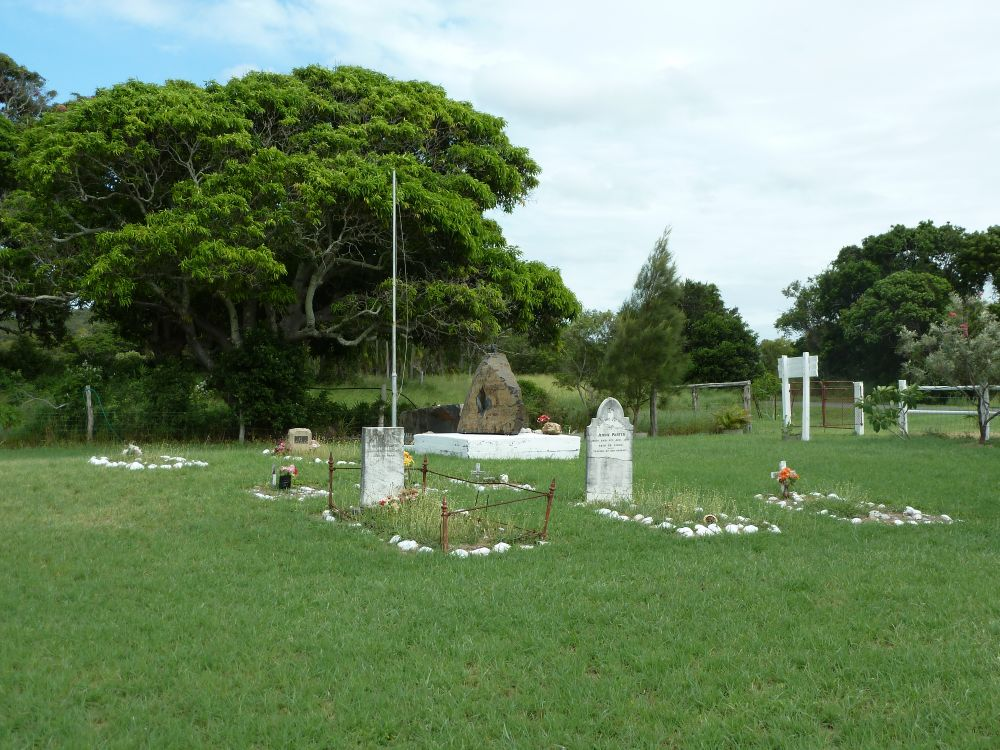
- Joskeleigh Cemetery, 2001

- Location within Queensland Location within Australia
- 23.3678°S 150.7791°E
- Location: Joskeleigh Road, Joskeleigh, Shire of Livingstone, Queensland, Australia

History
- Design period: 1870s–1890s (late 19th century)
- Built: 1890s–1900s

Queensland Heritage Register
- Official name: Joskeleigh Cemetery, Sandhills Historical South Sea Islander Cemetery
- Type: state heritage (built, landscape)
- Designated: 21 October 1992
- Reference no.: 600659
- Significant period: 1890s– (social); 1890s (fabric); 1890s–2001 (historical)
- Significant components: cemetery, grave surrounds/railings, memorial – rock/stone/boulder, headstone, trees/plantings

Joskeleigh Cemetery is a heritage-listed cemetery at Joskeleigh Road, Joskeleigh, Shire of Livingstone, Queensland, Australia. It was built from 1890s to 1900s. It is also known as Sandhills Historical South Sea Islander Cemetery. It was added to the Queensland Heritage Register on 21 October 1992.

== History ==
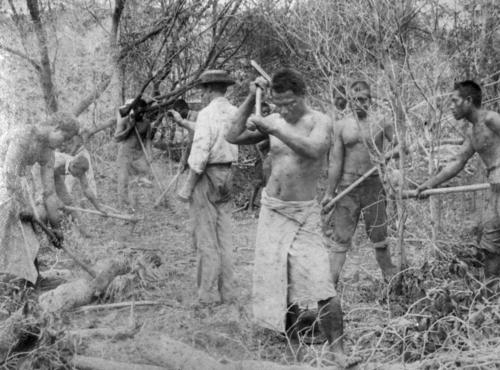
Kanakas working in Farnborough, 1895

The use of the area that became the Joskeleigh Cemetery was established on privately owned land at Sandhills/Joskeleigh by the late 1890s/early 1900s by the local South Sea Islander community. By 1983 there were fifth-generation descendants of the original cane workers brought to the Rockhampton district in the late 19th century living in the Joskeleigh area.

In the period 1863–1904, South Sea Islanders were the principal labour force in Queensland's sugar industry, and until about 1880 also worked in the pastoral and maritime industries. Approximately 50,000 Islanders took up indentures to work in Queensland in this period, many signing up more than once. Following federation of the Australian colonies in 1901 and the resultant triumph of the "White Australia" movement, the new Australian Government passed the Pacific Island Labourers Act 1901, which proclaimed that the recruiting of South Sea Islands labour was to cease from 1904 and that as many Islanders as possible were to be repatriated by 1907. Between 1904 and 1908, 7,068 Islanders were repatriated and another 194 were deported in 1914. However, between 2,000 and 2,500 Islanders were exempt from repatriation and acquired Australian citizenship. In the late 1990s their descendants number around 15,000.

In Queensland, Islanders were introduced firstly as labour in the cotton industry and on pastoral properties, and later to work on the sugar plantations along the coast. Clearing the land before planting the sugar cane. In the Rockhampton area, extensive sugar plantations were established in the Yeppoon, Farnborough, Cawarral, and Joskeleigh districts. Sugar was first tried at the Sand hills by Mr Joske (after whom Joskeleigh is named) but the land was too arid. The Yeppoon Sugar Plantation employed up to 180 South Sea Islander workers, both men and women.

When forcible repatriation of Islanders was introduced by the Commonwealth Government in the early 1900s, the Islander population around Rockhampton comprised 79 island born, 47 Queensland born, and 8 married women not liable to deportation. No children were to be sent back, and of the island born all but 23 had lived in Queensland for more than 20 years and so could claim exemption from deportation. Of these 23, five were married to women who did not come from their own island, and so were permitted to remain, and the other 18 were able to stay because they were mostly earning their own living on land they either owned or leased.

The majority of Islanders who chose to stay in Central Queensland settled in the Keppel Sands (originally Sandhills) area at Joskeleigh, which has a beach frontage of several kilometres and is the nearest ocean beach to Rockhampton. By 1914 the population was estimated at 200. The Joskeleigh School was established in 1915, and by the 1930s the population had peaked at around 250–300. The community estimates that the Islander population had a 10% intermarriage rate with an Aboriginal tribe which lived in the area until the 1930s, when the last of these Indigenous people were forcibly removed to reserves.

The Islander community first rented land from Bill Cuff, the Sandhills storekeeper, for a nominal 2/6 per year, and on this they built thatched huts of blady grass in the traditional manner, with Tea Tree Bark and traditionally made rope from the wild hibiscus bark. The Islanders soon became self-sufficient by growing crops and market gardens to provide food and an income for their families. Their families grew up there and soon began buying their own blocks of land south of Mr Cuff's who first invited the South Sea Islanders to the Sandhills. He originally worked at the Yeppoon Sugar Plantation Sugar Mill at Farnborough. When the mill ceased to operate in 1904 he invited some of the Islanders who worked on the plantation to work for him on his newly purchased acreage. Another land owner, Alexander Charles Huth sold them some of his land. They worked for him in his gardens and with their earnings paid for their land.

Traditional skills in fishing, net-making, medicine, horticulture and building continued to be practised and even taught in the local school, and this was a rich source of cultural pride and community cohesion. Between 1901 and 1914 the Islanders accepted Christianity, taught by Gospel hall missionaries from Rockhampton, but retained many of their island religious customs and spiritual beliefs.

When someone died, a wake was held and in days gone by this celebration lasted for three days with a huge feast prepared and cooked island style. It was a happy time and celebrated that the spirit of the deceased had gone to a happier place. Inexpensive use of glass ornamentation, and shells around the graves, were used to decorate the graves. Shells were used quite often to decorate not only the graves, but also their garden beds. Glass ornamentation was used as the families could often not afford anything else.

The Joskeleigh Cemetery is associated mostly with the first generation of Australian Islanders who resided at Sandhills. Twenty-two men, women and children are buried there, almost all Islanders except for one English women who had married into the community. Oral history suggests that there are other unmarked graves outside the boundaries of the cemetery.

The burial ground, established on about a quarter of an acre of a 100-acre freehold at Sandhills, appears to have been abandoned when the Islander community took up their own land south of Sandhills. By the early 1980s the cemetery had been badly damaged by farm machinery. Twenty of the graves had been bulldozed; headstones were broken and picket fences had been burnt to clear some of the area. This caused considerable distress amongst Joskeleigh residents whose relatives were buried there. In response, the local Islander community, led by Mrs Mabel Edmund, encouraged the National Trust to list the site in 1981 and formed the Joskeleigh Historical and Progress Association in 1983 to preserve the place.

Fund raising commenced and negotiations with the then landholder were undertaken in order to purchase the area of land where the graves were located. These discussions were unsuccessful and the Association, led by Mrs Edmund, lobbied the Queensland Government to resume the burial ground and officially declare it a reserve for cemetery purposes. This was achieved in 1984.

The State Government bought a quarter acre of land surrounding most of the graves to preserve the area as an historical site. The land was held in trust by the Joskeleigh Historical Society, however in recent times this has been handed over to the Livingstone Shire Council. The community also maintains the grounds. Little restoration work was undertaken until 1991, when graves were marked; headstones re-erected where possible; a stone monument was erected with a plaque which bears the names of all those buried in the cemetery; a fence and gates were constructed and a sign painted.

The most recent burial in the Joskeleigh Cemetery was Mrs Evelyn Warcon in 2001. The Joskeleigh Cemetery has become an important and attractive part of the landscape and a source of pride to the community and a permanent reminder of South Sea Islander heritage.

== Description ==
The South Sea Islander village of Joskeleigh is located 40 kilometres (25 mi) from Rockhampton, on the coast.

The cemetery site comprised approximately a quarter of an acre and was originally part of a 100-acre freehold block. It is bounded on the north by Joskeleigh Road and to the south, west and east by freehold property on which is located mature vegetation, including mango and pine trees. All headstones within the cemetery face easterly.

The plaque bearing the names of those buried there is mounted on a large memorial stone. Oral history suggests that some Islanders are buried outside the present cemetery boundaries [in some cases it is said that people are buried outside of the cemetery grounds even though their headstones are located within the grounds].

Glass ornamentation and shells surround most of the graves. Shells were used quite often to decorate not only the graves, but also garden beds. Some graves are marked with timber crucifixes. There are a number of marble headstones, one of which has a metal grave surround.

A timber rotunda is located with the cemetery. The cemetery is surrounded by a timber fence with access via Joskeleigh Road.

== Heritage listing ==
Joskeleigh Cemetery was listed on the Queensland Heritage Register on 21 October 1992 having satisfied the following criteria.

The place is important in demonstrating the evolution or pattern of Queensland's history.

Joskeleigh Cemetery is important in illustrating the pattern of Queensland's history as evidence of the development of Joskeleigh and surrounding area as a settlement predominantly of South Sea Islander people, who owned or leased land, farmed it, and lived in the area since the 1890s.

A well-known landmark, Joskeleigh Cemetery, with its grave surrounds, markers and headstones, set in a tended lawn, with the surrounding area bounded by mature vegetation, particularly mango and pine trees, is significant for its aesthetic appeal.

The place demonstrates rare, uncommon or endangered aspects of Queensland's cultural heritage.

The Joskeleigh Cemetery is comparatively rare in Queensland, as the final resting place for, predominantly, South Sea Islander people.

The place is important in demonstrating the principal characteristics of a particular class of cultural places.

Joskeleigh Cemetery illustrates some of the principal characteristics of a small burial ground, including a lack of denominational divisions and locally connected interments.

The place has a strong or special association with a particular community or cultural group for social, cultural or spiritual reasons.

Joskeleigh Cemetery is especially important for its strong social significance and for the association it holds for descendants of the early South Sea Islander families of Joskeleigh and surrounding area with their heritage and the experiences of their ancestors in Queensland.
