= St Andrew's Graveyard, Brighton =

Church cemetery in Melbourne, Victoria, Australia

- Interactive map of St Andrew's Graveyard, Brighton

Details
- Established: 1843
- Location: Brighton, Victoria
- Country: Australia
- Coordinates: 37°54′40″S 144°59′34″E
- Size: 2 acres (0.81 ha)
- No. of interments: >350
- Find a Grave: St Andrew's Graveyard, Brighton

St Andrew's Graveyard, Brighton is the graveyard of St Andrew's Anglican Church, Brighton, Melbourne, Victoria, Australia. The St Andrew's Graveyard is of historical significance as an extremely early, pre-Gold Rush graveyard and as a rare surviving example of such a graveyard in Victoria.

It is one of four remaining churchyards in Victoria.

The St Andrew's Graveyard is notable for the tombstones of early Victorian pioneers and prominent citizens, and their families, contained within it. These include Jonathan B. Were, leading merchant and agent and founder of J. B. Were and Son (d. 1885); Henry B. Foot, surveyor and planner of the Brighton township (d. 1857); William A. Brodribb, pastoralist and politician (d. 1886) and Thomas Higinbotham, chief engineer of the Victorian Railways (d. 1880). The retention of a wooden memorial marker (date unknown) is also of significance.

== See also ==
Scots Uniting Church Graveyard, Campbellfield
