= Proserpine Cemetery =

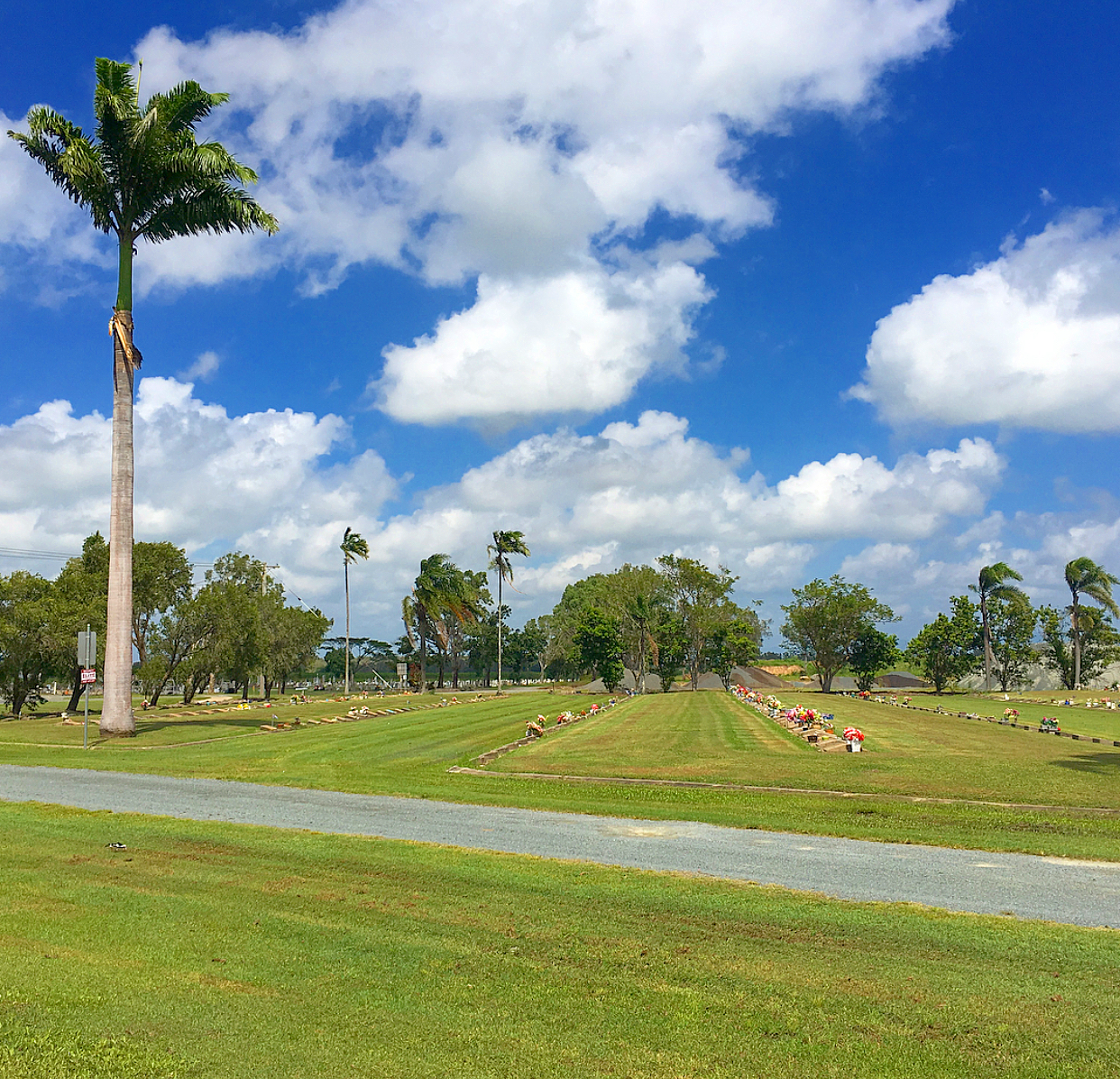
- Proserpine Lawn Cemetery.
- Interactive map of Proserpine Cemetery

Details
- Established: circa 1880.
- Location: Proserpine, Queensland
- Country: Australia
- Coordinates: 20.3948°S 148.5640°E
- Type: Public
- Find a Grave: Proserpine Cemetery

Proserpine Cemetery is a cemetery located in Proserpine a town in the Whitsunday Region of Queensland, Australia. It opened in the late 1880s and has seen the burials of many of the town's and region's pioneers. It is made up of two sections. The "Old" section was used from the late 1880s up until the 1980s and a "New" section which is the lawn cemetery that opened in the 1980s.

== History ==
The Proserpine Cemetery began being used in the late 1880s and was placed under the control of the Proserpine Shire Council in the early 1900s.

Before this, many burials occurred in isolated locations, and efforts have been made to document all of them. Unfortunately, some of these "lone graves" may never be found, but acknowledging their existence is crucial.

In the early days of Proserpine Cemetery, burials were largely unstructured, except for the separation of Catholic and Protestant sections. The weather often determined burial locations, with rainy-season burials in the northern part and dry-season burials in the southern part.

Originally, the cemetery had just two main sections: the Catholic Section (now mapped as Sections C-1 to C-8) and the Protestant Section (now mapped as Sections OP-1 to OP-11).

For a long time, babies were buried wherever space allowed, often between other graves. Later, specific sections were designated for baby burials. Notably, children and babies feature prominently in the list of "Missing Graves".

Unfortunately, early burial practices showed evidence of racial prejudice, with certain minority groups buried "against the fence" on the western side of the original Protestant section.

The fence was later removed when the cemetery was extended, and a road was built in its place. This road now serves the New Protestant area (mapped as Sections NP-1 to NP-9). It is highly likely that graves lie beneath this road.

When suicides were considered shameful, pressure existed to bury victims "outside the gates." Evidence suggests at least one such burial occurred. The "Missing Graves" list includes several suicides, but despite extensive research, it remains unclear which individuals were buried outside the cemetery or where those burials took place.

== War graves ==
Proserpine Cemetery contains many war graves of Proserpine people who have served in all major wars.

== Gallery ==
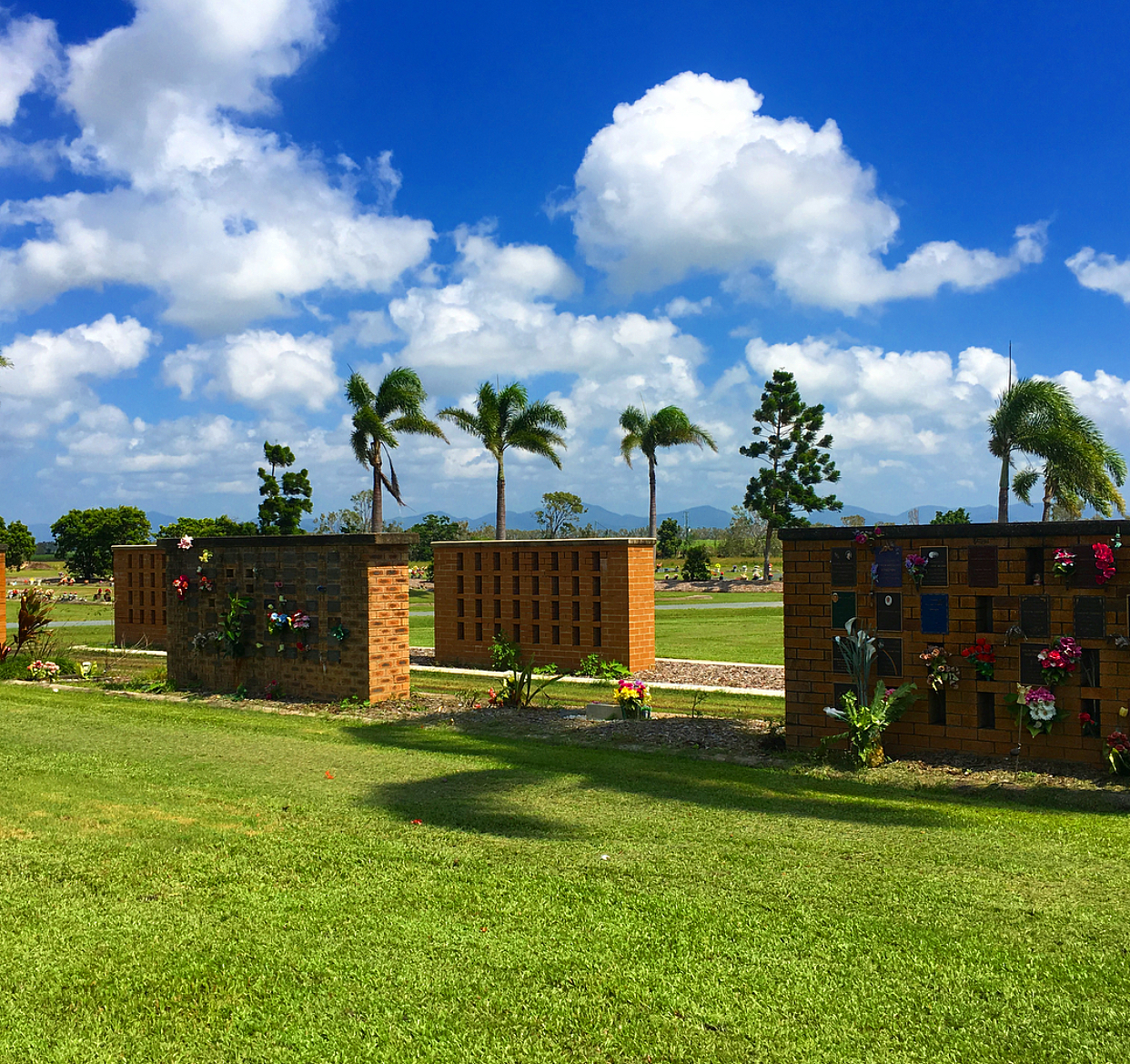
The Columbarium

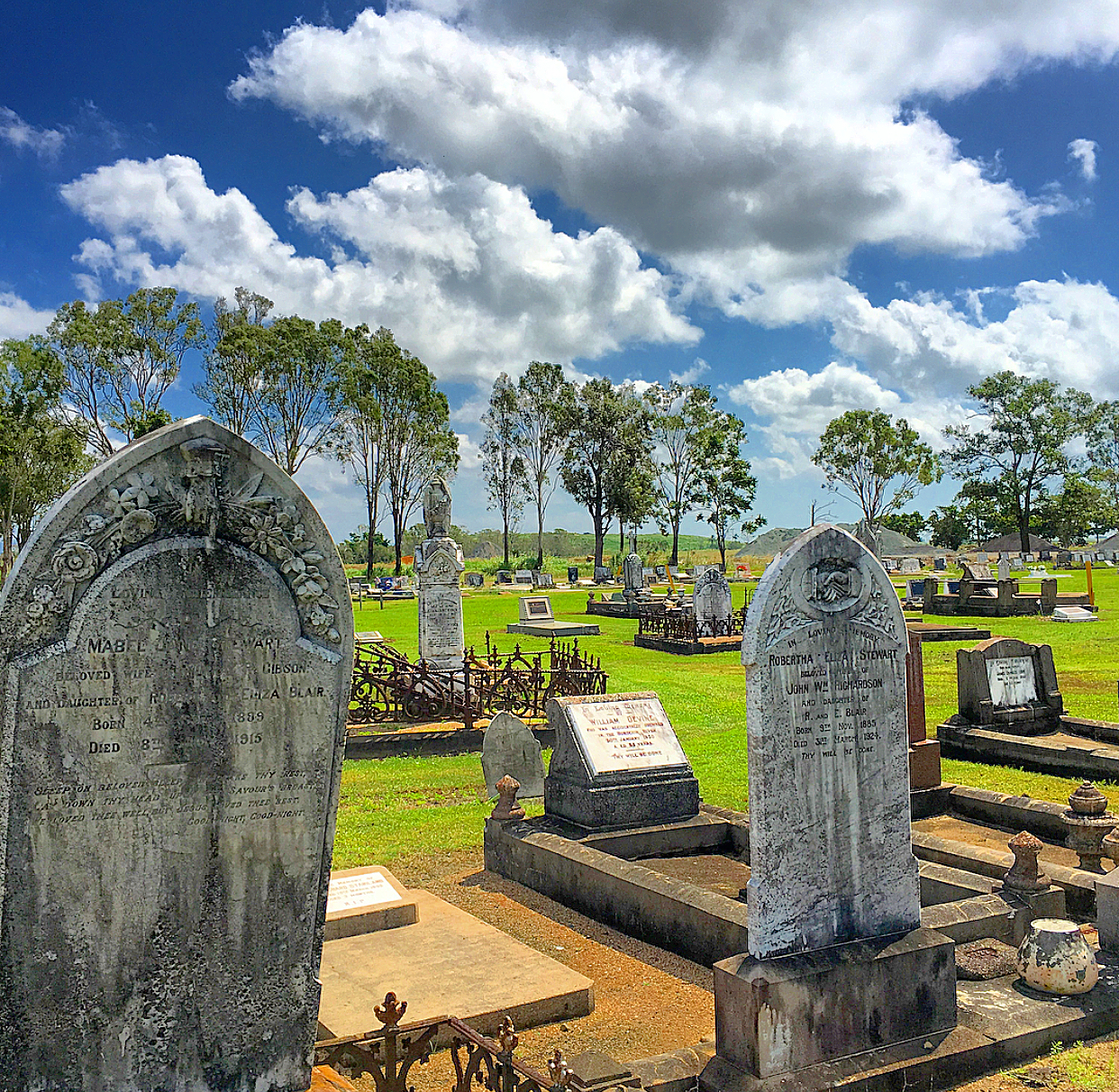
The "Old" Section

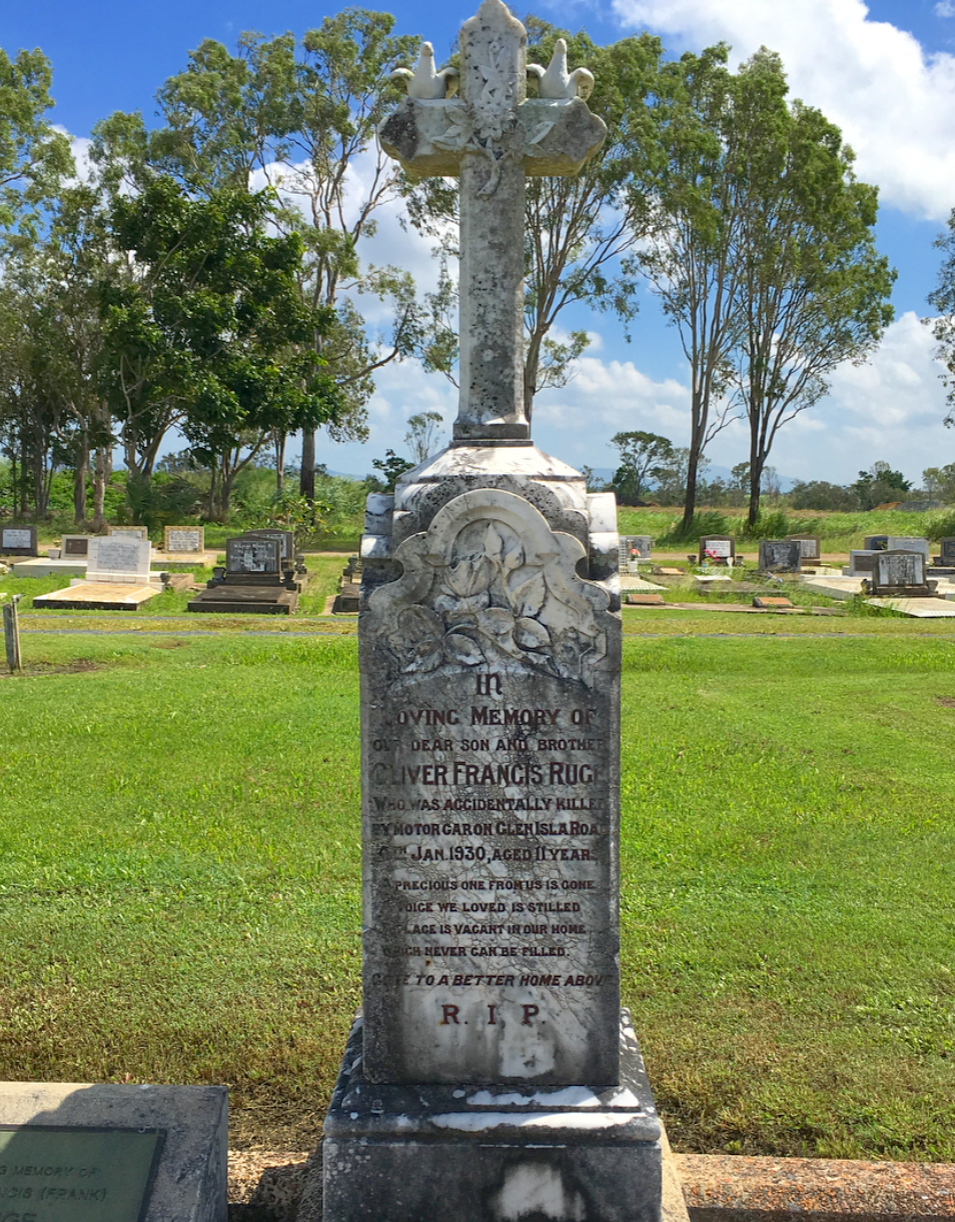
Grave of Oliver Francis Ruge (d. 1930)

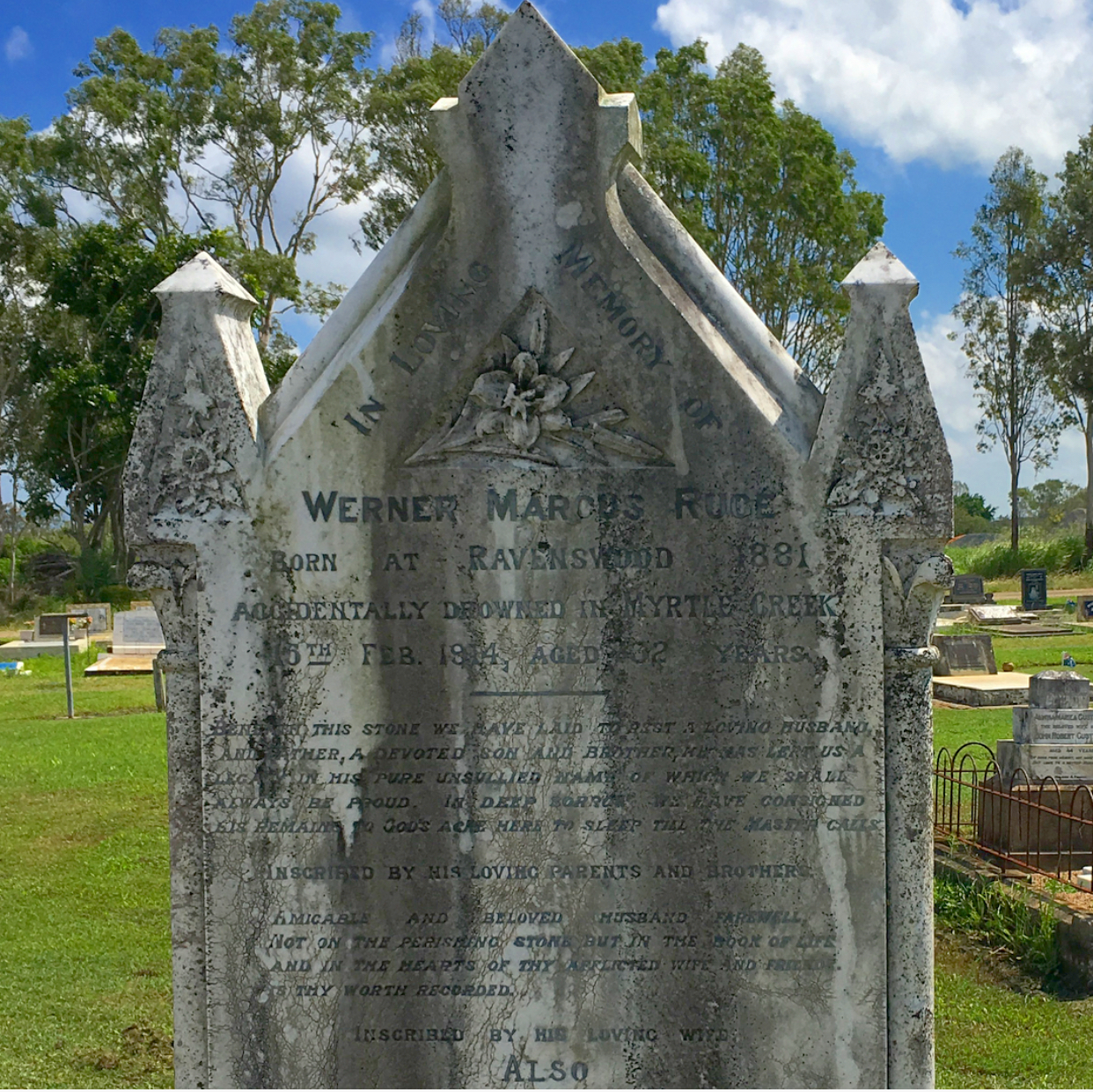
Grave of Werner Marcus Ruge (d. 1914)

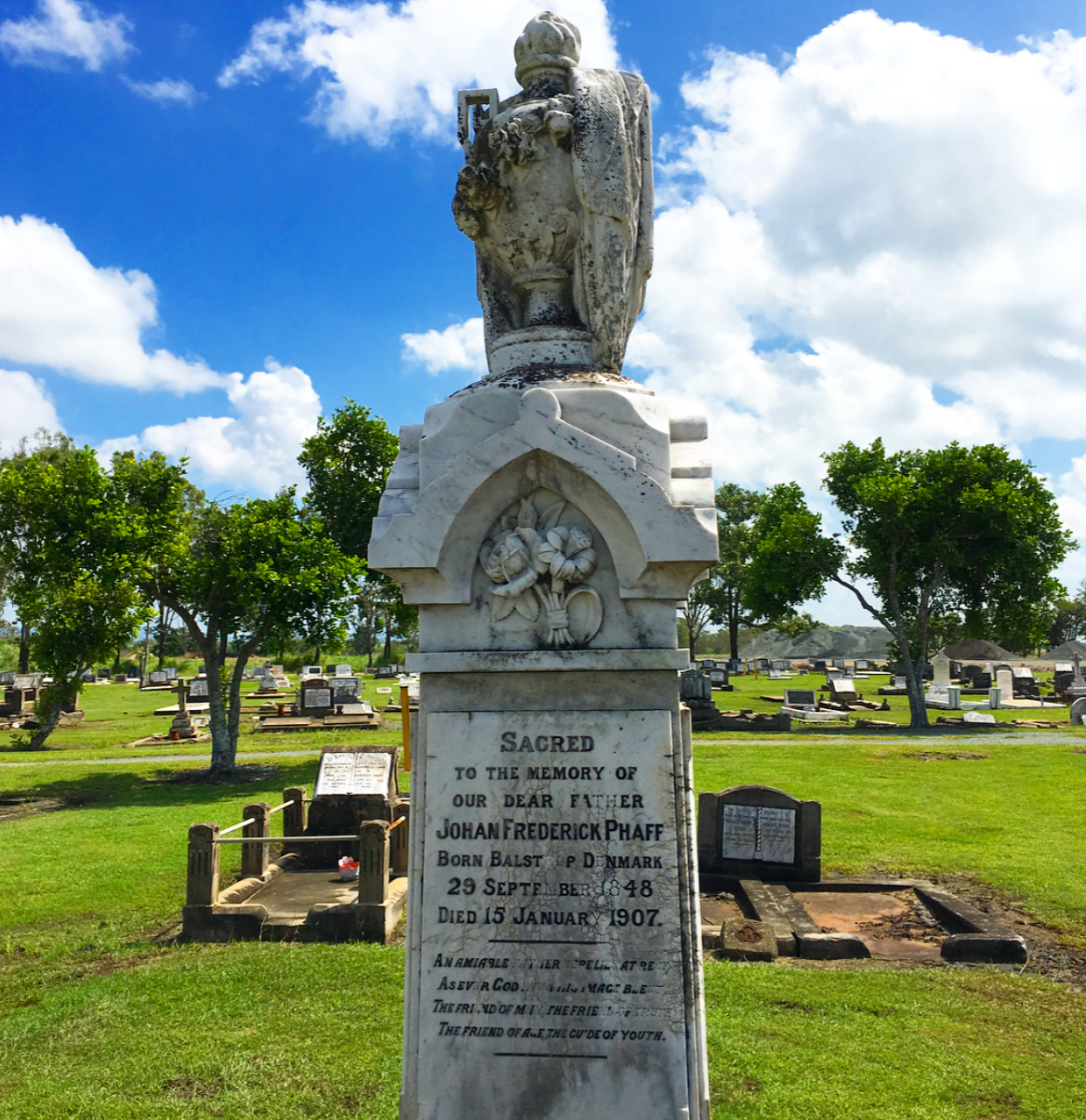
Grave of Johan Frederick Phaff (d. 1907)

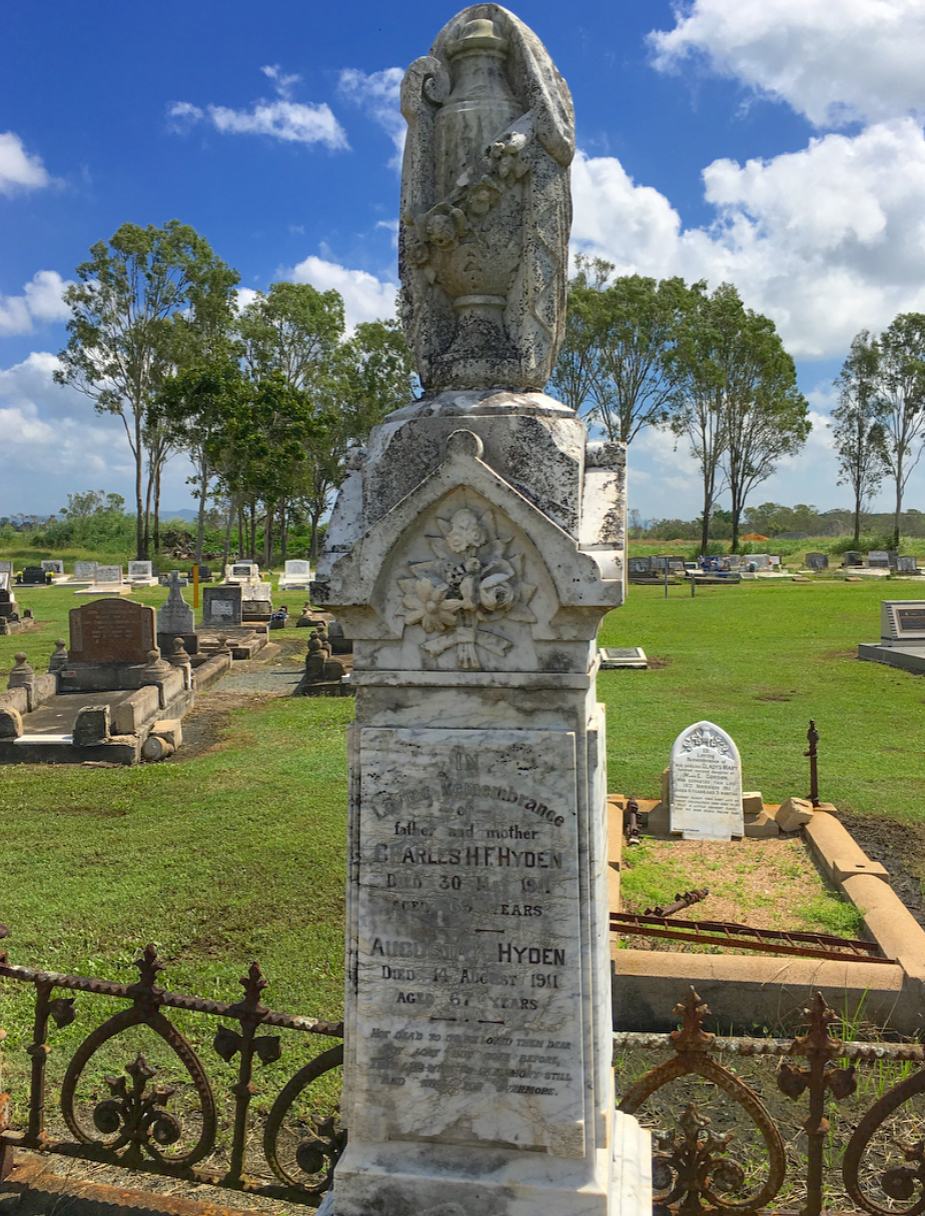
Grave of Charles & August Hyden (both d. 1911)

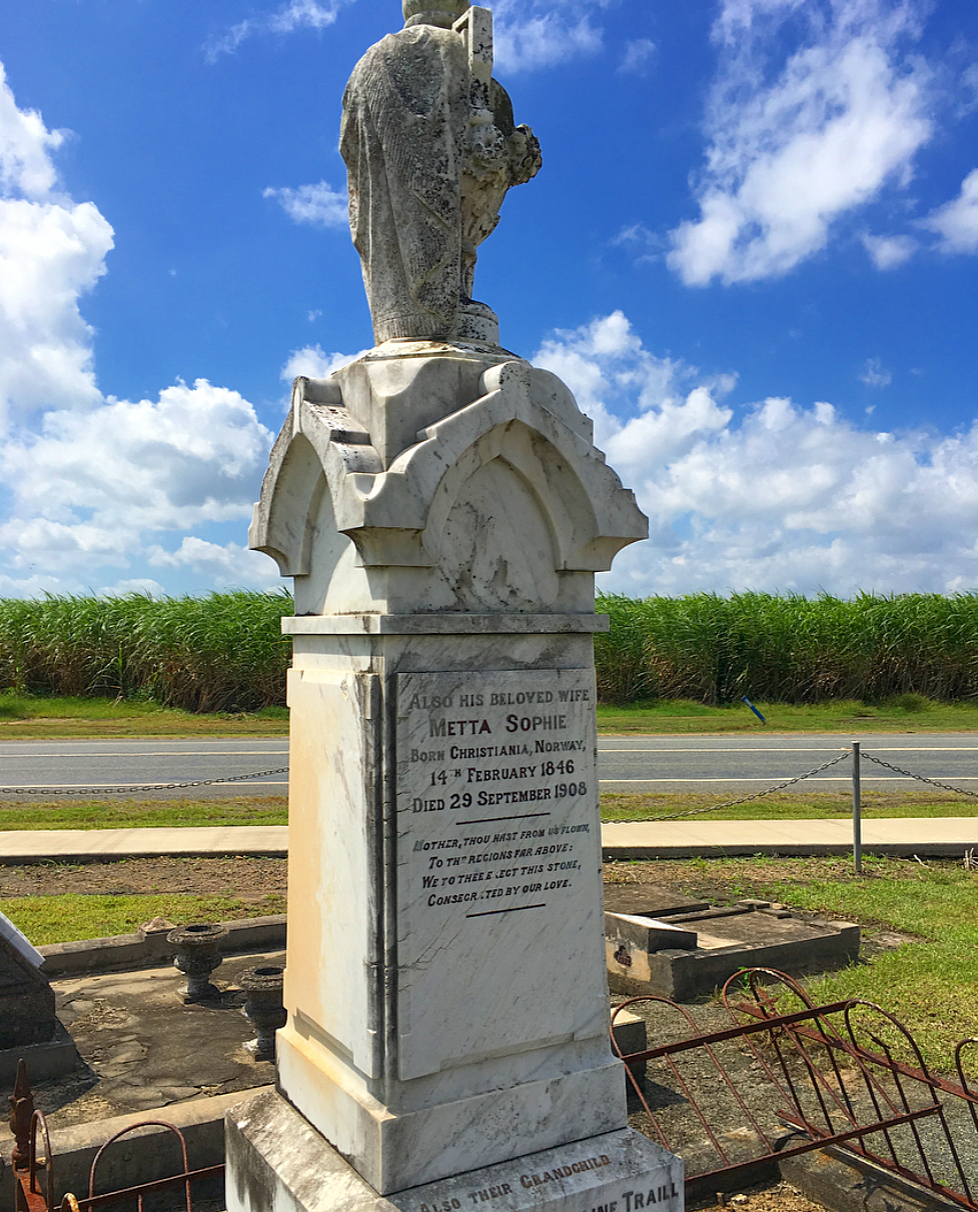
Grave of Metta Sophie (d. 1908)

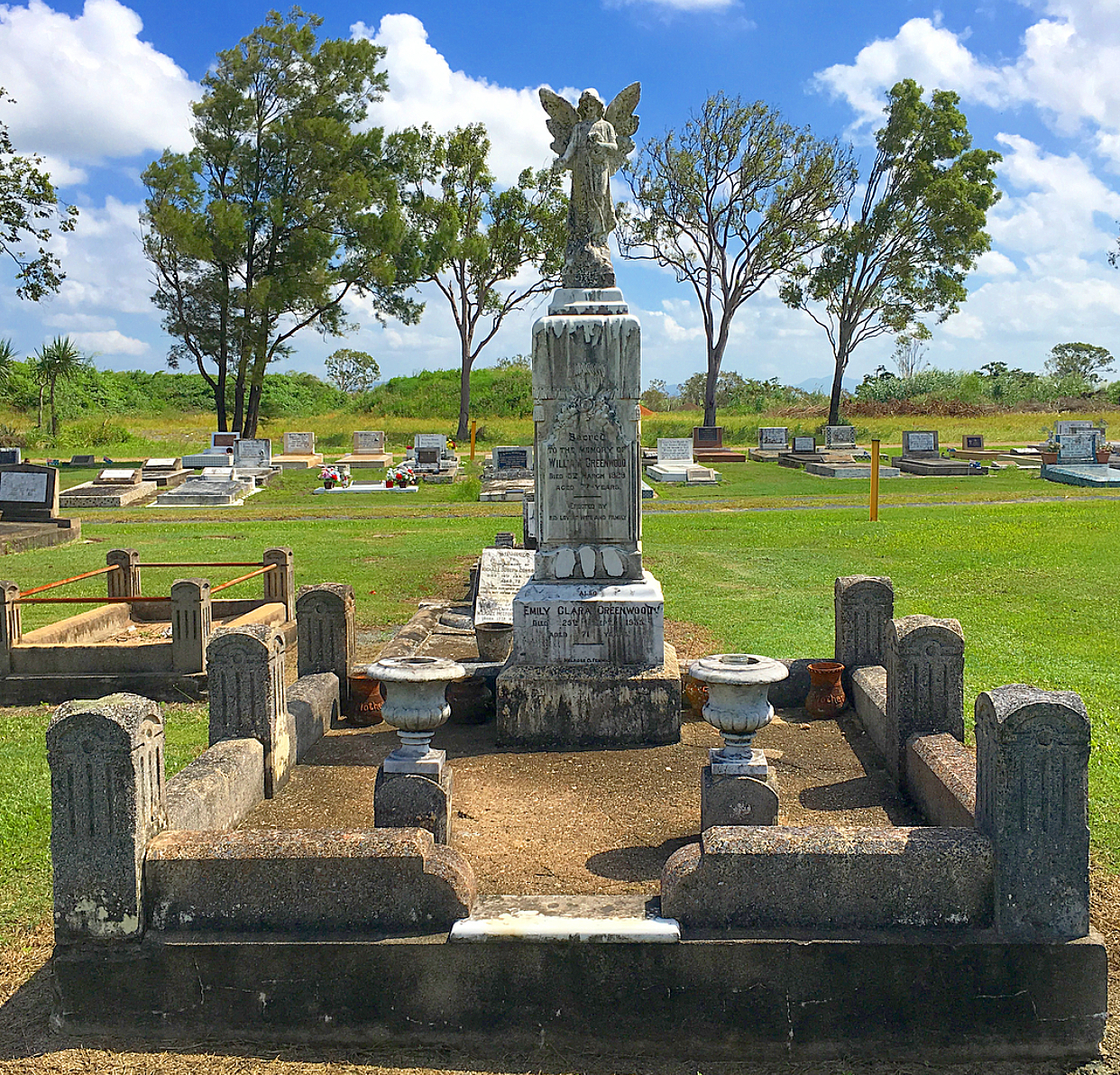
Grave of William Greenwood
