= Guildford Cemetery, Western Australia =

Cemetery in South Guildford, Western Australia

Guilford Cemetery
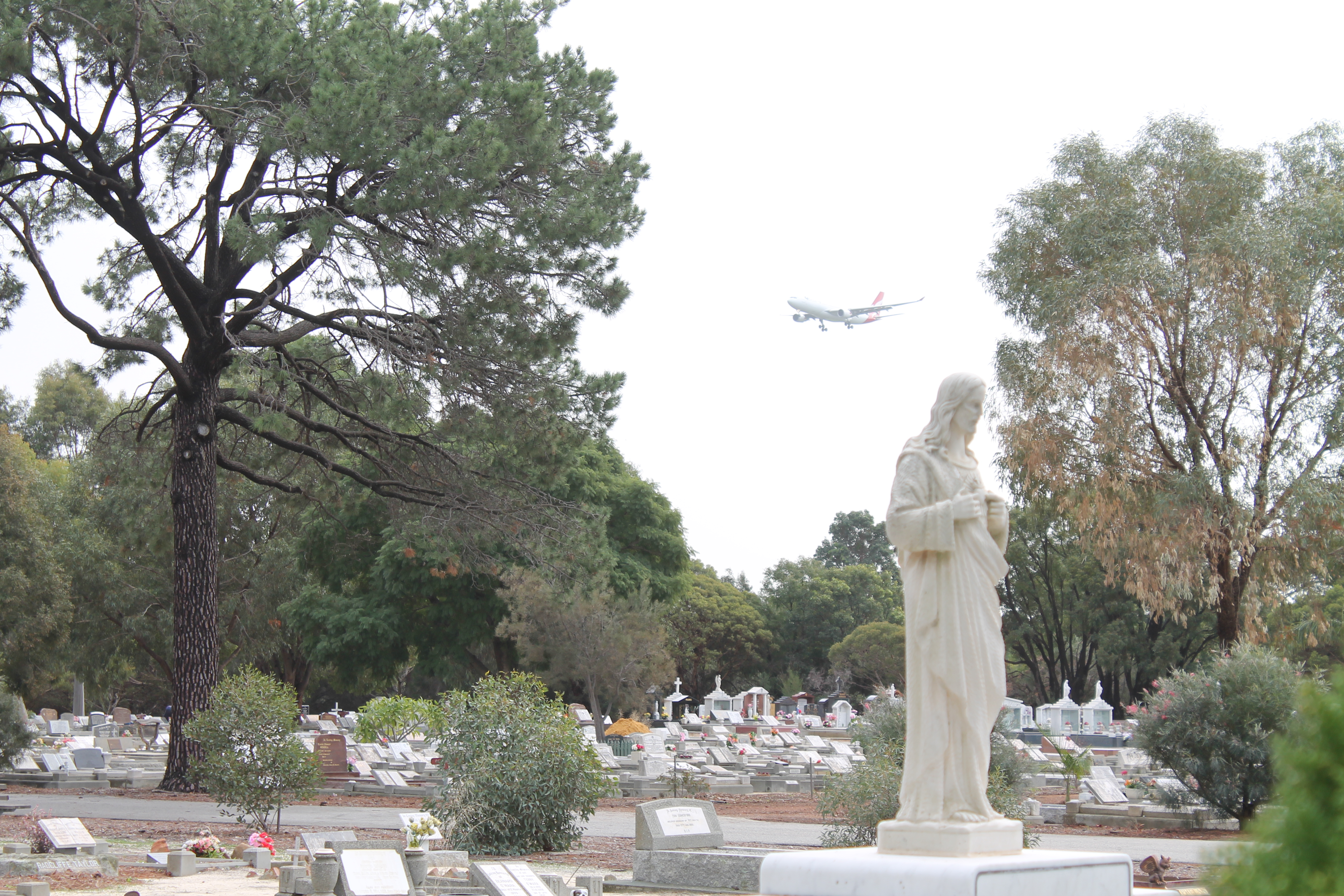
- Guildford Cemetery
- Interactive map of Guilford Cemetery

Details
- Location: South Guildford, Western Australia
- Country: Australia
- Coordinates: 31°55′06″S 115°58′41″E
- Owned by: Metropolitan Cemeteries Board
- Find a Grave: Guilford Cemetery

Western Australia Heritage Register
- Official name: Guildford Cemetery
- Type: State Register
- Designated: 2 September 1998
- Reference no.: 4647

Guildford Cemetery is a cemetery in the southern part of South Guildford, Western Australia, located between the Great Eastern Highway Bypass and Kalamunda Road adjacent to the Perth Airport.

An earlier cemetery in Guildford was established early in the history of the Swan River Colony in James Street; some headstones were moved to Guildford Cemetery when it was established. Burials also occurred in the churchyard in what is now Stirling Square.

In 1888 it was decided that the present cemetery site, which was already in some use at that time, should be used for all future burials. A year later, the church was asking for donations to help maintain the cemetery.

In 1937 a new management board was established, to broaden the responsibility for the cemetery from the Anglican, Roman Catholic and Wesleyan churches to also include the Salvation Army and the three local road boards (Swan, Bassendean, and Belmont and Darling). It is currently managed by the Metropolitan Cemeteries Board.

Burial lists up to 1998 are available from the Cemeteries Board and are viewable at Battye Library.

== See also ==
- Category:Burials at Karrakatta Cemetery
- East Perth Cemeteries
- Midland Cemetery
