= Scots Uniting Church, Campbellfield =

Early Presbyterian church and graveyard in Victoria, Australia

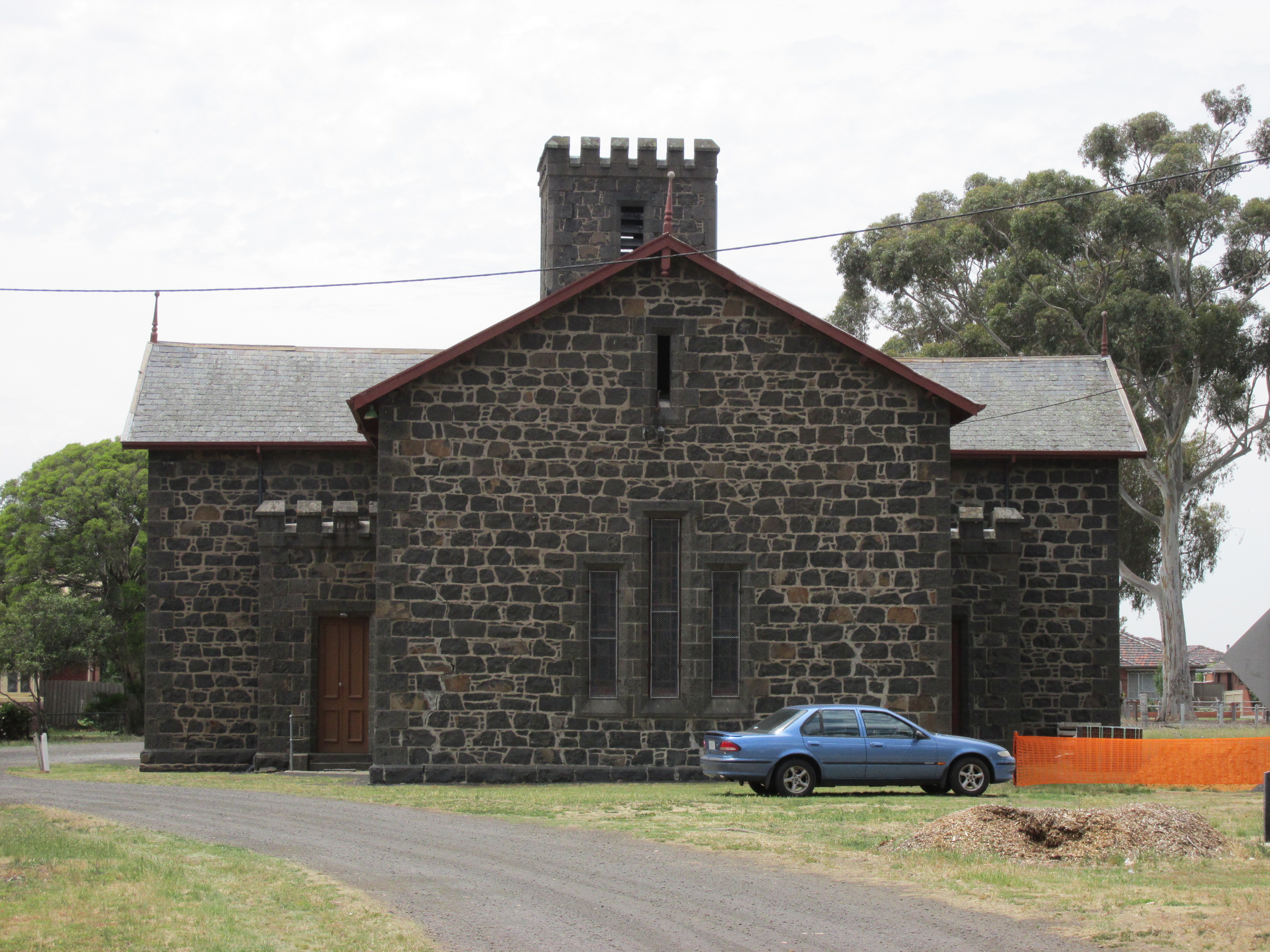
- The church exterior in 2014

- Location of the church in Greater Metropolitan Melbourne
- Scots Uniting Church, Campbellfield
- 37°40′33″S 144°57′24″E
- Location: Campbellfield, Hume City, Victoria
- Country: Australia
- Denomination: Uniting
- Previous denomination: Presbyterian

History
- Status: Active

Architecture
- Functional status: Church
- Architect: Charles Laing
- Architectural type: Church
- Style: Tudor Gothic
- Completed: 1855

Specifications
- Materials: Bluestone

Victorian Heritage Register
- Official name: Scots Uniting Church
- Type: State heritage (building)
- Designated: 9 October 1974
- Reference no.: H0127
- Heritage overlay no.: HO3
- Category: Religion

The Scots Uniting Church is a heritage-listed Uniting Church in Australia church, located at 1702 Hume Highway, Campbellfield, Hume City, Victoria, Australia. The church was added to the Victorian Heritage Register on 9 October 1974 in recognition of its historical, architectural and archaeological significance; and has one of the four remaining churchyards in Victoria.

== History ==
In 1842 a timber church was constructed on the site. In 1855 the bluestone church, designed by Charles Laing, was built to replace the original church. The churchyard, which adjoins the church, has its earliest surviving gravestone from 1846 and the cemetery contains approximately 150 burials.

== See also ==
- St Andrew's Graveyard, Brighton
