= St Patrick's Cemetery, North Parramatta =

Cemetery in Sydney, New South Wales

St Patricks Roman Catholic Cemetery
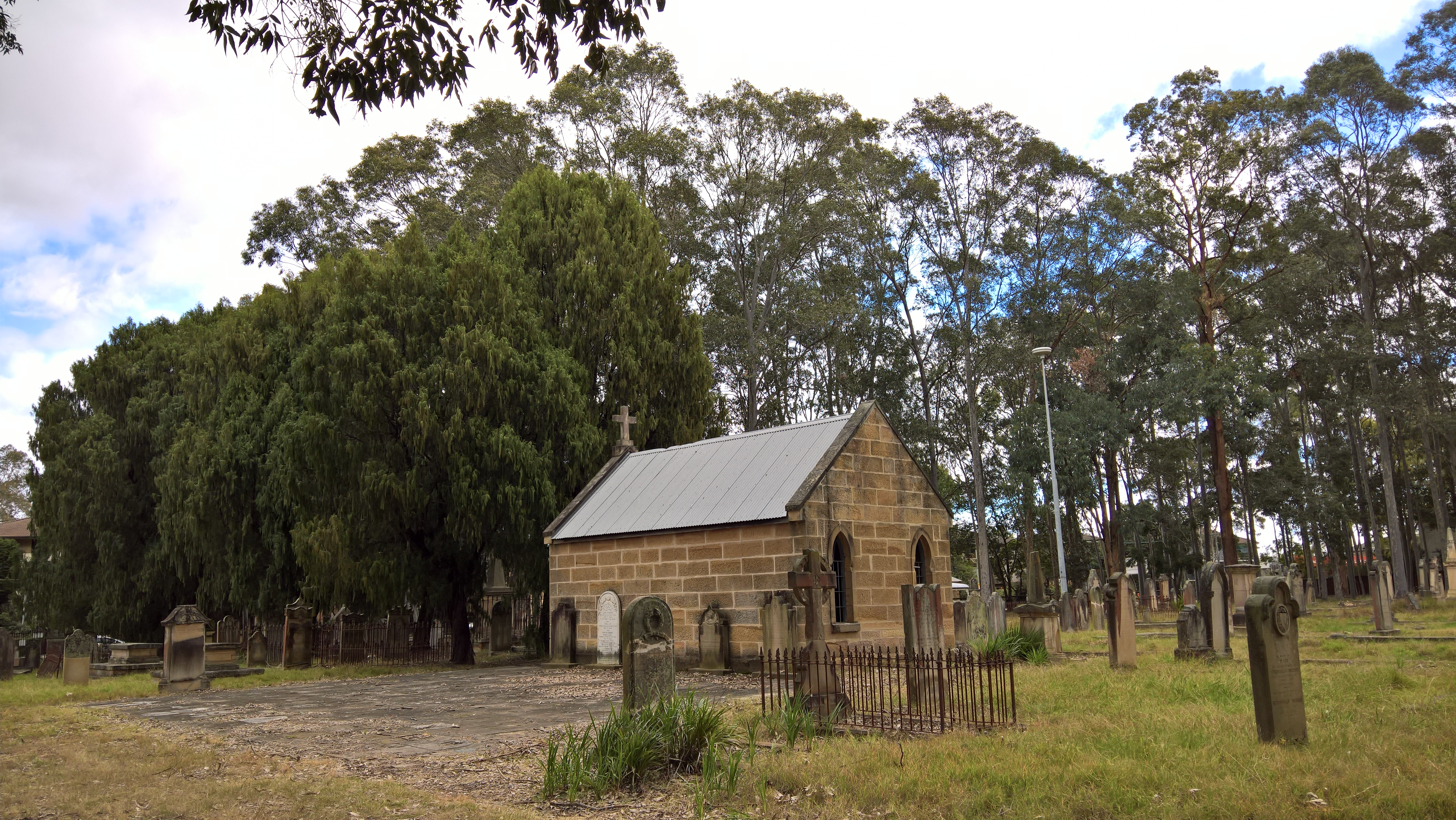
- Mortuary Chapel and graves at St Patrick's Cemetery, North Parramatta
- Interactive map of St Patricks Roman Catholic Cemetery

Details
- Established: 1824
- Closed: 1972
- Location: Cnr Pennant Hills Road and Church Street, North Parramatta, Sydney, New South Wales
- Country: Australia
- Coordinates: 33.796606°S 151.005914°E
- Type: Historic
- Owned by: City of Parramatta Council
- Size: 5 hectares (12 acres)
- No. of graves: 2000+
- Find a Grave: St Patricks Roman Catholic Cemetery

Designations

New South Wales Heritage Register
- Official name: St. Patrick's Roman Catholic Cemetery
- Designated: 23 March 2012
- Reference no.: 01880

St Patrick's Roman Catholic Cemetery is a heritage-listed closed cemetery on the corner of Pennant Hills Road and Church Street, North Parramatta, City of Parramatta, New South Wales, Australia. It is the earliest formalised Catholic cemetery in Australia, and was in use from 1824 to 1972. A central feature of this historic cemetery is the 1844 Gothic revival styled mortuary chapel, which is the oldest mortuary chapel in Australia. The cemetery was closed in 1972 and subsequently transferred to the City of Parramatta in 1975. It was added to the New South Wales State Heritage Register on 23 March 2012.

== History ==
=== Aboriginal associations with the area ===
The Indigenous people who inhabited the Parramatta River and its headwaters consisted of a number of clans, hordes or families known generally as the Darug Nation. At the head of the river were the Burramattagal clan (or Barramattagal) whose tribal lands included the area of the present day city of Parramatta. The country was highly suitable as a place to live with its ample fresh water, prolific plant and animal life and temperate climate.

While there seems to have been little conflict between the new settlers and the Indigenous inhabitants at this time in the Parramatta area (unlike Sydney Cove) the Barrumattagal clan were devastated by introduced European diseases, including the 1789 smallpox epidemic. By 1830 there were no known survivors of the Burramattagal clan (Kass, Liston, McClymont: 1996: 4–6, 14–16, 26; Parramatta Council riverside interpretation).

=== Establishing St Patrick's Roman Catholic Cemetery ===
The establishment of St Patrick's Cemetery, the oldest formal Catholic burial ground in Australia, is surrounded by some ambiguity.

In 1822 Father John Joseph Therry, the Catholic Chaplain, sought the assistance of the Colonial Government to obtain a grant for a burial ground for the exclusive use of Catholics in Parramatta. The matter was the subject of an article published in The Australian in 1825 where it was stated that "it was in strict accordance with the discipline of the Catholic Church, and calculated to prevent the clashing or inconvenient interference of the respective duties of the clergymen of different societies, and the recurrence of an instance which had more than once taken place, in which burials or surplice dues were required from the surviving friends of the deceased Catholics by a minister who had not officiated at the interments".

In 1826, after having sought further government assistance for the erection of a temporary church at Parramatta, Father Therry was finally able to secure tenure of a block of land at the junction of Pennant Hills Road and Church Street, (then Windsor Road), for use as the Catholic Cemetery. Three headstones, however, date from 1824: Thomas Nugent, Phillip Reilly and Thomas McKenna. Therefore, it seems Father Therry's actions preceded the approval of Government.

Research conducted by the Heritage Branch in August–September 2010 on the extant burial registers from St Patrick's Cemetery and convict records held at State Records NSW has determined 44 known convict burials, including two Irish rebel convicts, with a further ten possible convict burials at the cemetery. Further research is likely to determine more convict and Irish rebel burials.

The value of the land sited at the intersection of two main roads soon formed a basis for attempts to resume the block while another block next to the Brickfield Protestant Burial Ground (now All Saints Cemetery) was offered as a substitute. This move was resisted and the original cemetery site was quickly fenced in 1834.

The foundation stone of the sandstone mortuary chapel was laid in August 1844. The dedication of the chapel is unusual in that it is recorded under the patronage of St Francis of Assisi rather than being named after the patron saint of the dead and dying, St Michael (as is for example at the old mortuary chapel at Rookwood Cemetery). The change arose from the intention of Dean Coffey (himself a Franciscan) to honour his friend Father McCarthy of the Capuchin Order, which was founded in Italy in 1528. Capuchins are followers of St Francis of Assisi. As the Capuchins were not established as an order in Australia until 1945, the many Capuchins who worked in the Australian Catholic Church prior to then did so an individual missionaries (or were associated with the group that worked under the Bishop of Armidale). Bishop Elzear Torreggiani.The completed chapel provided the focus for a Chinese funeral cypress (Cupressus funebris)-lined avenue leading from Church Street.

Possibly prompted by the construction of the chapel on land that had been approved but not actually granted, the Lands Department finally formalised the situation when Governor Sir George Gipps signed a grant on 31 March 1846. This however, was only for a "Church or Chapel on land with an area of 1 acre 3 roods 4 perches". On 20 May 1846 the land was surveyed, leading to a further deed being granted on 12 June 1846 for an area of 5 acres 3 roods 20 perches. This included that area already granted for the chapel. On the 1 December 1874 the land was granted once again and signed by the Governor in 1875. This means that the cemetery has been granted twice and that portion around the chapel, three times.

St Patrick's Cemetery is a material reminder of the early recognition of the independence of Catholics in a Protestant-dominated colonial society and demonstrates important phases in the origins, nature and development of the Catholic community in Australia. The sandstone mortuary chapel is the oldest remaining in Australia and is an important early example of Australian religious architecture. Its construction, together with the 1834 site fencing, also served as a political statement by confirming the claim to the site by the Catholic community.

=== A cemetery in progress ===
On 18 January 1878 Father John Rigney noted that "the one Catholic Cemetery in the district [was] fenced in and [had] been blessed by the Archbishop. The graves [were] moderately well kept". In 1936 a lych gate within a brick and iron fence was constructed to denote the entrance from the Pennant Hills Road and Church Street intersection.

In November 1946 there was a call by Parramatta Council to close all Parramatta cemeteries to further burials. Council was unsuccessful on this occasion. A survey in 1954 indicated that the cemetery, while well fenced in and stockproofed, had been used for only three burials in recent years. No accounts or books were being kept and the general condition was only fair.

Efforts were made to improve the condition through a "beautification and tree planting" program in the 1950s, which included the planting of the scattered spotted gums (Corymbia maculata) and brush box (Lophostemon confertus) that give the site much of its identity today.

=== The closure of the cemetery ===
The continuing expense of maintenance led finally to the first suggestion of closure of the cemetery in 1971 and the eventual transfer of the land from the Church to Parramatta City Council in 1975 pursuant with the Conversion of Cemeteries Act, 1974. Notice of closure had appeared in the Parish Bulletin on 30 January 1972 and 6 February 1972. But on 5 May 1974 Parramatta City Council refused to accept trusteeship if St Patrick's was to remain a cemetery. It was not until 22 May 1975, after some dispute over the plans for converting the cemetery, that the deed vesting trusteeship with Parramatta City Council was finally signed. On 27 January 1976 Council's control of the cemetery was noted by the Registrar General.

St Patrick's Roman Catholic Cemetery was classified by the National Trust in 1976.

== Description ==
As granted, St Patrick's Cemetery area was over 5 acres (2 hectares) in size, but has been slightly reduced and reshaped by subsequent modern road widening and reservations.

The cemetery occupies a large, trapezoid-shaped site at the northern uphill corner of the Church Street and Pennant Hills Road intersection. Both roads are major district traffic routes. A third road, Castle Street, borders the north-eastern side of the cemetery, and modern three-storey home unit blocks adjoin the north-western boundary of the site. The cemetery area is level, and features an intensive tree cover, including some surviving older tree plantings including a pair of Chinese funeral cypresses (Cupressus funebris) west of and flanking the entrance to the Mortuary Chapel and extensive plantings of spotted gums (Corymbia maculata) and brush box (Lophostemon confertus) dating from the 1950s.

St Patrick's Cemetery is a prominent townscape element when viewed from the surrounding road corridors. The extensive tree cover creates a "green oasis" at the Church Street/Pennant Hills Road intersection, providing a visual respite from the otherwise intensively developed built environment adjacent to the site. The cemetery also provides an item of visual interest in this surrounding context owing to the different quality and texture of its landscape in an otherwise suburban setting.

The earliest monuments in the cemetery date from the 1820s. Three extant headstones date from 1824, the earliest being that of Thomas Nugent (29 April 1824). These are generally simple, Georgian style, sandstone headstones which continue into the 1840s, and some early altar tombs. The oldest evident (marked) graves are situated in the southern half of the site area. The orientation of the older graves varies considerably in this area, with fairly short and random rows, or clusters of monuments scattered across the cemetery. The scattered distribution of monuments may reflect the loss of intervening elements, for example monuments such as timber crosses, and also unmarked graves. The cemetery is known to contain some 2000 burials although only around 400 monuments are now extant. Whilst a majority of these older monuments generally face in an easterly direction (90 degrees), others face northeast, and some face west.

An early feature added to the cemetery was the Mortuary Chapel erected in 1844 over the remains of Father Thomas Francis McCarthy and dedicated to St Francis. The stone over the chapel door states it was dedicated in 1844, "To the glory of God under the patronage of Saint Francis". Inside the chapel is a bronze plaque placed by the Capuchins in 1994 to mark the 150th anniversary of the chapel that reads Fr Thomas McCarthy OSFC (Order of St Francis Capuchin). The chapel is a small Gothic style building, constructed of fine ashlar masonry with a gable roof. Detailing includes two lancet arched windows at the eastern end, and a lancet arched doorway with decorative hood moulding and a cross finial at the western end of the building. The chapel also features a marble altar (now damaged) between the windows. Five other Parramatta priests are buried under the chapel floor: the Franciscan Dean Nicholas Coffey (died 1857) who built the third St Patrick's Church; Dean John Rigney, pioneer of the Illawarrra; Monsignor Thomas O'Reilly (died 1919), parish priest of Parramatta, and Monsignor Joseph McGovern, founder of the Catholic Historical Society.

The Mortuary Chapel was placed in the centre of the cemetery with access on an axis almost 60 degrees to the Church Street boundary. This axis/access to Church Street was reinforced by the planting of staggered rows of cypresses lining the entrance way. The access from Church Street itself was provided by a lay-back or curved carriageway entry which was also reinforced by cypress planting. The entry to the cemetery was marked by elaborate Gothic style iron gates with substantial sandstone gate posts. After the acquisition of a reservation for road widening in the 1970s, the gates were relocated to a position on the new (realigned) cemetery boundary. The original footings for the gates, and other significant physical remnants of this early entry design are still evident in-situ and should be conserved. Road widening works to create a bus lane and shared cycleway within the Church Street road reservation will result in a reconfiguring of the Church Street entrance and impact on the surviving physical evidence within the road reservation.

From the mid nineteenth century onwards, the areas adjoining and north of the Mortuary Chapel appear to have been increasingly utilised and developed. The layout of the burial areas appears to have become more organised, with regular rows of east facing graves and headstones, some apparently laid out in relation to the access from Church Street. Judging from the elaboration of the extant monuments, locations adjoining the access from Church Street to the Mortuary Chapel were prime positions. A range of highly decorated headstones within substantial iron surrounds survives on either side of the pathway.

Many of the earlier inscriptions include biographical detail such as county of origin, place of death, names of relatives, etc. Several of the earlier inscriptions also feature the inclusion of verses which record typical sentiments and beliefs of the era, or in some cases particular and elaborate detail concerning the deceased and/or circumstances of death. The simpler headstone forms continue into the second half of the nineteenth century but are supplemented by some more elaborate profiles and designs which derive from the High Victorian and Gothic Revival architectural styles which were popular during the period. St Patrick's Cemetery contains several examples of sandstone headstones notable for the aesthetics and technical accomplishment of their carving or other detailing. There are also some interesting examples of more naive attempts at elaborate carving. Typical more elaborate mid to late nineteenth century forms are the larger pedestal, spire and obelisk memorials which occur in the cemetery. St Patrick's Cemetery is notable for the extensive use of a wide range of symbolic motifs on headstones. This is particularly the case for monuments dating from the high-Victorian era of the last half of the nineteenth century.

Other significant individual elements added to the site include the two Chinese funeral cypresses (Cupressus funebris) planted as a pair at the corners of the sandstone pedestal which marks the Martin Family vault just west of the Mortuary Chapel, and a number of larger scale individual monuments which now provide minor focal points within the cemetery.

Design elements were added to the cemetery during the twentieth century. In 1936 a low brick and iron panel fence was constructed across the southern end of the site (adjacent to the Church Street and Pennant Hills Road intersection) with a timber framed lych gate providing entry to the cemetery. The construction of this feature suggests that, at this time, the focus of the site may have been shifting south to meet the expanding edge of Parramatta.

Although St Patrick's Cemetery remained in use until the 1970s it contains very few recent memorials. This may partly have resulted from the ongoing use of existing family plots with metal plaques or inscriptions added to already existing monuments. Monuments of manufactured materials such as concrete or terrazzo are not common in the cemetery, and the general lack of recent memorials gives the cemetery an important overall unity of materials and styles which should be maintained.

=== Condition ===
The removal of footstones has deprived early graves of part of their originally intended design. Most of the footstones which are not in their original position have been placed face upwards within a concrete courtyard adjacent to the Mortuary Chapel. Some headstones have also been relocated into the chapel courtyard. Most of these seem to have been moved in anticipation of the widening of Church Street, and the consequent infringement on the older cemetery boundary. Other reset stones appear to have been previously broken by vandals and were possibly transferred to the courtyard either for "safekeeping" or in an effort to "tidy up" the cemetery.

A significant proportion of heritage monuments and the 1844 sandstone mortuary chapel have been damaged through vandalism. The increasing aging and weathering of monuments is exacerbating their vulnerability to vandalism, with some previously repaired and re-erected monuments having sustained subsequent damage (grant application, 1/2011)

The cemetery is largely intact, although there have been some unsympathetic modifications in the recent past.

=== Modifications and dates ===
The landscape of St Patrick's Cemetery presents a combination of elements from a number of phases in the previous development of the site. The cemetery has also been subject to several attempts at both improvement and restoration which have left indelible impressions on the site and partly altered the character of its surviving physical evidence.

A 1950s tree planting program introduced the scattered spotted gums and brush box that characterise the site.

1970s landscaping works included:

- light poles to deter vandalism;
- paved paths;
- relocation of footstones and headstones to the Mortuary Chapel courtyard;
- low brick wall constructed around the Mortuary Chapel
- re-roofing of the Mortuary Chapel with asbestos cement shingles.

Widening Church Street:

- 1967 gazettal enabled the Roads and Traffic Authority (RTA) to resume a strip of land fronting Church Street under Section 27E(6) of the Main Roads Act 1924–1965.
- Since 1993 there have been a series of RTA proposals for widening Church street to allow for extra bus lanes. Most of these have involved resuming a ribbon of land from the Church Street frontage of the cemetery. The Heritage Office/Heritage Branch and the Heritage Council have been involved in negotiations with Parramatta Council and the RTA in relation to these proposals.

1970s works included:

- relocation of iron cemetery gates and sandstone entrance pillars on Church Street to their present position on the realigned boundary to allow for future road widening of Church Street (east side).
- relocation of at least seven headstones (but not the burials) to allow for road widening.

== Heritage listing ==
St Patrick's Cemetery is of state and national significance as one of Australia's most significant burial grounds and as the earliest formalised Catholic cemetery in Australia, with, as its central design feature, the oldest mortuary chapel in Australia. Dating from the early 1820s, the cemetery demonstrates the early recognition of the independence of Catholics in a Protestant (particularly Anglican) -dominated colonial society, and important phases in the origins, nature and development of the Catholic community in Australia. The cemetery's fabric demonstrates an evolving approach to the planning and spatial organisation of the place as a burial ground, the development of funerary customs and tastes, and changing notions of appropriate landscape and architectural design. The stylistically restrained Gothic-revival styled mortuary chapel is the focal point for a largely surviving formal entry layout, oriented towards Church Street, of considerable charm and distinction. The cemetery offers evidence of associations with Catholic convicts and Irish rebels; with the Capuchin and Franciscan communities; with the wider Catholic community of the Parramatta region from the 1820s; with notable individuals, families and early institutions of the Parramatta district, as well as evidence of the multiculturalism of the early settlement in its recorded burials of German, Italian and Chinese nationals.

St Patrick's Roman Catholic Cemetery was listed on the New South Wales State Heritage Register on 23 March 2012 having satisfied the following criteria.

The place is important in demonstrating the course, or pattern, of cultural or natural history in New South Wales.

St Patrick's Cemetery is of State significance as the earliest formalised Catholic cemetery in Australia that demonstrates the early recognition of the independence of Catholics in a Protestant (largely Anglican) -dominated colonial society. The cemetery demonstrates important phases in the origins, nature and development of the Catholic community in NSW.

The cemetery is of State significance for the earliest large group of Catholic convict burials in a Catholic cemetery. Approximately 50 convicts (including 2 Irish rebels) are known to be buried at the cemetery. Further research is likely to demonstrate a larger number of convict and Irish rebels burials.

The cemetery is State significant for the 1844 sandstone mortuary chapel which is the oldest remaining in Australia and an important early example of Australian religious architecture. Its construction, together with its 1834 site fencing, also served as a political statement by confirming the claim to the site by the Catholic community.

The place has a strong or special association with a person, or group of persons, of importance of cultural or natural history of New South Wales's history.

St Patrick's Cemetery is State significant for its early associations with the Franciscan and Capuchin orders in Australia though its 1844 mortuary chapel which is the oldest in Australia.

The cemetery is of state significance for its association with the wider Catholic community of the Parramatta region from the 1820s which includes prominent individuals from the Parramatta region's Catholic community over almost 180 years. The three earliest surviving headstones date from 1824, while many of the other hundreds of monuments on site provide important and rich biographical details.

As a colonial-era cemetery it is of state significance as the burial ground for many Catholic convicts and an unknown number of exiled Irish rebels.

St Patrick's Cemetery is of local significance for its association with Parramatta's first Parish Priest, Father John Joseph Therry, who persisted with acquiring and establishing this cemetery in its present location despite recalcitrance on the part of the colonial government of the day.

The cemetery has local significance for the five eminent parish priests to have served at Parramatta who are buried under the chapel floor, two of whom were Franciscans: Father Thomas McCarthy, Franciscan died 1844; Dean Nicholas Coffey, Franciscan, who built the third St Patrick's Church, died 1857; Dean John Rigney, pioneer of the Illawarra, died 1903; Monsignor Thomas O'Reilly, parish priest of Parramatta for 30 years, died 1919; and Monsignor Joseph McGovern, who founded the Catholic Historical Society, died 1964.

The place is important in demonstrating aesthetic characteristics and/or a high degree of creative or technical achievement in New South Wales.

St Patrick's Cemetery is of State significance for the high aesthetic quality of some of its landscaping and mortuary monuments and for its mortuary chapel. The cemetery contains individual headstones of considerable aesthetic as well as historical interest and its formal landscape design is of a high calibre and rare quality.

Prominently located at a key road junction, the cemetery provides visual interest, textural variety and a measure of tranquillity that contrasts with the forms of development and land use in the immediate area. As such it fulfils an important townscape function.

The Gothic revival mortuary chapel is architecturally significant with many features exemplifying a high degree of craft quality. In particular the small sandstone altar with its inverted pyramidal base, black metal panel and white crucifix echoes the stepped base and cruciform motif above the front gable of the building.

The chapel is also the focus of an important early formal landscape layout where the ornate sandstone and iron gates (1870s or late 1860s), together with Chinese mourning cypress trees (Cupressus funebris), enclosed a driveway entry area and framed a cypress-lined pathway up to the chapel's front facade. Both the extant structure of this formal layout (including the sandstone kerbing and layback on Church Street) and the surviving cypresses are significant elements, integral with the importance of the whole site.

The place has strong or special association with a particular community or cultural group in New South Wales for social, cultural or spiritual reasons.

St Patrick's Cemetery is of State significance for its long and continuous links with the Catholic community of the Parramatta region that date from November 1788 with the establishment of Parramatta as the second mainland settlement of the colony of NSW. A burial register from 1840 suggests that people made great efforts to bring the dead from outlying areas (as far away as Liverpool, Windsor, Wilberforce, Colo and Berrima) to St Patrick's Cemetery, rather than bury them in nearer but non-Catholic cemeteries.

The cemetery contains evidence of burials from a comprehensive cross section of Catholic society in the Parramatta region from the 1820s, with all classes and levels represented. The collective cemetery fabric is indicative and representative of the changing cultural preferences, beliefs, tastes, customs and styles of the Catholic community throughout this time.

The cemetery has particular significance to the current Catholic community which regularly celebrates mass every All Soul's Day (2 November) in the mortuary chapel.

The place has potential to yield information that will contribute to an understanding of the cultural or natural history of New South Wales.

St Patrick's Cemetery is of State significance for its research and archaeological potential:

- of all burials, marked and unmarked, to determine the full extent of convict and Irish rebel burials;
- of its material fabric, including mortuary detailing and early landscaping remnants.
- of its older surviving plants for the retention of useful genetic material. Many of these plants remain in a healthy condition after more than a century of poor growing conditions, including the ravages of white ant infestations and vandalism.

The place possesses uncommon, rare or endangered aspects of the cultural or natural history of New South Wales.

St Patrick's Cemetery is of State significance for its rarity as an early, formalised Catholic burial ground in NSW and for the rare quality of its formal landscape design. St Patrick's Cemetery has comparative significance with two other early Catholic cemeteries that were both consecrated in the 1830s: the McCarthy family cemetery at Castlereagh/Penrith Lakes with its earliest burial c. 1809; and the Catholic estate cemetery for convict workers at Sir John Jamieson's residence "Regentville". St Patrick's Cemetery is rare for its chapel dedication to St Francis of Assisi (rather than to St Michael as the patron saint of the dead and dying) which honours Father McCarthy who was of the Capuchin Order (Capuchins being followers of St Francis of Assisi).

The place is important in demonstrating the principal characteristics of a class of cultural or natural places/environments in New South Wales.

St Patrick's Cemetery is of State significance for its mortuary monuments, which are representative of the common types and styles used in Catholic cemeteries in NSW between 1820 and 1970.

== See also ==
- https://stpatscemeterynp.com/

  Website of Friends of St Patrick's Cemetery

- Roman Catholic Archdiocese of Sydney
