= Midland Cemetery =

Cemetery in Swan View, Perth, Western Australia

- Midland Cemetery in September, 2026
- Interactive map of Midland Cemetery

Details
- Location: Swan View, Western Australia
- Country: Australia
- Coordinates: 31°52′47″S 116°02′36″E
- Owned by: Metropolitan Cemeteries Board
- Website: Midland Cemetery
- Find a Grave: Midland Cemetery
- Footnotes: Midland Cemetery – Billion Graves; Midland Junction Cemetery CWGC

Midland Cemetery is a metropolitan cemetery in the suburb of Swan view in Perth, Western Australia. In earlier times it was known as the Midland Junction Cemetery due to its control by the local council of that name.

It is currently administered by the Metropolitan Cemeteries Board. Previously it had been administered by the local government.

People interred at Midland Cemetery include Albert Facey.

Burial lists up to 1998 are available from the Cemeteries Board and are viewable at Battye Library.

== War graves ==
There are two war graves at the cemetery of Australian soldiers of World War I.

== See also ==
- Burials at Karrakatta Cemetery
- East Perth Cemeteries
- Guildford cemetery
