= Members of the Western Australian Legislative Council, 1962–1965 =

This is a list of members of the Western Australian Legislative Council from 22 May 1962 to 21 May 1965.

Significant changes occurred to the structure of the Legislative Council and the manner of voting during the term. The Constitution Acts Amendment Act (No.2) 1963 (No.72 of 1963) abolished the 10 three-member provinces which had existed almost unaltered since 1900, and created 15 new two-member provinces. Voting became compulsory and the property franchise was abolished, and the practice of having separate Legislative Council elections in May of every even-numbered year was abolished—the Council's members would now go to the voters at the same elections as members of the Legislative Assembly, although the rotational system where one member per province would retire at each election remained in effect, and unlike the Assembly, the Council's term still expired on 22 May every three years.

A number of transitional arrangements were necessary to put these changes into effect. Those who had terms expiring on 21 May 1964, and five of the ten whose terms were to expire on 21 May 1966 (those who had the lowest winning margins at the 1960 election) would retire on 21 May 1965. The remaining 15 members were eligible to be appointed to new provinces for terms expiring on 21 May 1968. Five of the 15 members whose terms expired in 1965 opted to retire—George Bennetts (Labor), Anthony Loton (Country), Reg Mattiske (Liberal), James Murray (Liberal) and John Teahan (Labor).

Name	Party	Province	Term expires	Years in office
Charles Abbey	Liberal	Central	~~1964~~ 1965	1958–1977
Norm Baxter	Country	Central	~~1966~~ 1965	1950–1958; 1960–1983
George Bennetts	Labor	South-East	~~1964~~ 1965	1946–1965
Evan Davies^{[2]}	Labor	West	1968	1947–1963
David Dellar^{[1]}	Labor	North-East	~~1964~~ 1965	1963–1965
Leslie Diver	Country	Central	1968	1952–1974
Jerry Dolan^{[2]}	Labor	West	1968	1963–1974
Jim Garrigan	Labor	South-East	~~1966~~ 1965	1954–1971
Arthur Griffith	Liberal	Suburban	~~1964~~ 1965	1953–1977
William Hall^{[1]}	Labor	North-East	1964	1938–1963
Eric Heenan	Labor	North-East	1968	1936–1968
Jack Heitman^{[3]}	Liberal	Midland	~~1964~~ 1965	1963–1977
James Hislop	Liberal	Metropolitan	~~1964~~ 1965	1941–1971
Ruby Hutchison	Labor	Suburban	~~1966~~ 1965	1954–1971
Ray Jones	Country	Midland	1968	1950–1967
Frederick Lavery	Labor	West	~~1964~~ 1965	1952–1971
Les Logan	Country	Midland	~~1966~~ 1968	1947–1974
Anthony Loton	Country	South	~~1964~~ 1965	1944–1965
Graham MacKinnon	Liberal	South-West	1968	1956–1986
Reg Mattiske	Liberal	Metropolitan	~~1966~~ 1965	1956–1965
James Murray	Liberal	South-West	~~1964~~ 1965	1951–1965
Herbert R. Robinson	Liberal	Suburban	1968	1962–1968
Charles Simpson^{[3]}	Country	Midland	1964	1946–1963
Harry Strickland	Labor	North	1968	1950–1970
Claude Stubbs	Labor	South-East	1968	1962–1980
John Teahan	Labor	North-East	~~1966~~ 1965	1954–1965
Ron Thompson	Labor	West	~~1966~~ 1968	1959–1980
Sydney Thompson	Country	South	~~1966~~ 1968	1960–1974
Jack Thomson	Country	South	1968	1950–1974
Keith Watson	Liberal	Metropolitan	1968	1948–1968
Bill Willesee	Labor	North	~~1966~~ 1968	1954–1974
Francis Drake Willmott	Liberal	South-West	~~1966~~ 1968	1955–1974
Frank Wise	Labor	North	~~1964~~ 1965	1956–1971

== Notes ==
^{1} On 1 May 1963, North-East Province Labor MLC William Hall died. Labor candidate David Dellar won the resulting by-election on 29 June 1963.
^{2} On 10 April 1963, West Province Labor MLC Evan Davies died. Labor candidate Jerry Dolan won the resulting by-election on 29 June 1963.
^{3} On 12 June 1963, Midland Province Country MLC Charles Simpson died. Liberal candidate Jack Heitman won the resulting by-election on 17 August 1963.

== Sources ==
- Black, David (1991). Legislative Council of Western Australia : membership register, electoral law and statistics, 1890-1989. Perth: Parliamentary History Project. ISBN 0-7309-3641-4. (especially p. 6)
- Hughes, Colin A.; Aitkin, Don (1986). Voting for the Australian State Upper Houses, 1890-1984. Canberra: Australian National University. ISBN 0-909779-18-X.
- Black, David; Bolton, Geoffrey (2001b). Biographical Register of Members of the Parliament of Western Australia. Vol. Two: 1930-1990 (Revised ed.). Parliament House: Parliament of Western Australia. ISBN 0731697839.
