= Members of the Western Australian Legislative Council, 1960–1962 =

This is a list of members of the Western Australian Legislative Council from 22 May 1960 to 21 May 1962. The chamber had 30 seats made up of ten provinces each electing three members, on a system of rotation whereby one-third of the members would retire at each biennial election.

The Constitution Acts Amendment Act (No.2) 1963 (No.72 of 1963) affected all terms concluding after 1962, as well as the provinces which members represented.

| Name | Party | Province | Term expires | Years in office |
|---|---|---|---|---|
| Charles Abbey | Liberal | Central | 1964* | 1958–1977 |
| Norm Baxter | Country | Central | 1966* | 1950–1958; 1960–1983 |
| George Bennetts | Labor | South-East | 1964* | 1946–1965 |
| John Cunningham | Liberal | South-East | 1962 | 1948–1954; 1955–1962 |
| Evan Davies | Labor | West | 1962 | 1947–1963 |
| Leslie Diver | Country | Central | 1962 | 1952–1974 |
| Jim Garrigan | Labor | South-East | 1966* | 1954–1971 |
| Arthur Griffith | Liberal | Suburban | 1964* | 1953–1977 |
| William Hall | Labor | North-East | 1964* | 1938–1963 |
| Eric Heenan | Labor | North-East | 1962 | 1936–1968 |
| James Hislop | Liberal | Metropolitan | 1964* | 1941–1971 |
| Ruby Hutchison | Labor | Suburban | 1966* | 1954–1971 |
| George Jeffery | Labor | Suburban | 1962 | 1956–1962 |
| Ray Jones | Country | Midland | 1962 | 1950–1967 |
| Frederick Lavery | Labor | West | 1964* | 1952–1971 |
| Les Logan | Country | Midland | 1966* | 1947–1974 |
| Anthony Loton | Country | South | 1964* | 1944–1965 |
| Graham MacKinnon | Liberal | South-West | 1962 | 1956–1986 |
| Reg Mattiske | Liberal | Metropolitan | 1966* | 1956–1965 |
| James Murray | Liberal | South-West | 1964* | 1951–1965 |
| Charles Simpson | Country | Midland | 1964* | 1946–1963 |
| Harry Strickland | Labor | North | 1962 | 1950–1970 |
| John Teahan | Labor | North-East | 1966* | 1954–1965 |
| Ron Thompson | Labor | West | 1966* | 1959–1980 |
| Sydney Thompson | Country | South | 1966* | 1960–1974 |
| Jack Thomson | Country | South | 1962 | 1950–1974 |
| Keith Watson | Liberal | Metropolitan | 1962 | 1948–1968 |
| Bill Willesee | Labor | North | 1966* | 1954–1974 |
| Francis Drake Willmott | Liberal | South-West | 1966* | 1955–1974 |
| Frank Wise | Labor | North | 1964* | 1956–1971 |

== Sources ==
- Black, David (1991). Legislative Council of Western Australia : membership register, electoral law and statistics, 1890-1989. Perth: Parliamentary History Project. ISBN 0-7309-3641-4.
- Hughes, Colin A.; Aitkin, Don (1986). Voting for the Australian State Upper Houses, 1890-1984. Canberra: Australian National University. ISBN 0-909779-18-X.
- Black, David; Bolton, Geoffrey (2001b). Biographical Register of Members of the Parliament of Western Australia. Vol. Two: 1930-1990 (Revised ed.). Parliament House: Parliament of Western Australia. ISBN 0731697839.
