= Members of the Western Australian Legislative Council, 1958–1960 =

This is a list of members of the Western Australian Legislative Council from 22 May 1958 to 21 May 1960. The chamber had 30 seats made up of ten provinces each electing three members, on a system of rotation whereby one-third of the members would retire at each biennial election.

The Constitution Acts Amendment Act (No.2) 1963 (No.72 of 1963) affected all terms concluding after 1962, as well as the provinces which members represented.

Name	Party	Province	Term expires	Years in office
Charles Abbey	Liberal	Central	1964*	1958–1977
George Bennetts	Labor	South-East	1964*	1946–1965
John Cunningham	Liberal	South-East	1962	1948–1954; 1955–1962
Evan Davies	Labor	West	1962	1947–1963
Leslie Diver	Country	Central	1962	1952–1974
Gilbert Fraser^{[1]}	Labor	West	1960	1928–1958
Jim Garrigan	Labor	South-East	1960	1954–1971
Arthur Griffith	Liberal	Suburban	1964*	1953–1977
William Hall	Labor	North-East	1964*	1938–1963
Eric Heenan	Labor	North-East	1962	1936–1968
James Hislop	Liberal	Metropolitan	1964*	1941–1971
Ruby Hutchison	Labor	Suburban	1960	1954–1971
George Jeffery	Labor	Suburban	1962	1956–1962
Ray Jones	Country	Midland	1962	1950–1967
Sir Charles Latham	Country	Central	1960	1946–1960
Frederick Lavery	Labor	West	1964*	1952–1971
Les Logan	Country	Midland	1960	1947–1974
Anthony Loton	Country	South	1964*	1944–1965
Graham MacKinnon	Liberal	South-West	1962	1956–1986
Reg Mattiske	Liberal	Metropolitan	1960	1956–1965
James Murray	Liberal	South-West	1964*	1951–1965
Hugh Roche	Country	South	1960	1940–1960
Charles Simpson	Country	Midland	1964*	1946–1963
Harry Strickland	Labor	North	1962	1950–1970
John Teahan	Labor	North-East	1960	1954–1965
Ron Thompson^{[1]}	Labor	West	1960	1959–1980
Jack Thomson	Country	South	1962	1950–1974
Keith Watson	Liberal	Metropolitan	1962	1948–1968
Bill Willesee	Labor	North	1960	1954–1974
Francis Drake Willmott	Liberal	South-West	1960	1955–1974
Frank Wise	Labor	North	1964*	1956–1971

== Notes ==
^{1} On 1 November 1958, West Province Labor MLC Gilbert Fraser died. Labor candidate Ron Thompson won the resulting by-election on 7 February 1959.

== Sources ==
- Black, David (1991). Legislative Council of Western Australia : membership register, electoral law and statistics, 1890-1989. Perth: Parliamentary History Project. ISBN 0-7309-3641-4.
- Hughes, Colin A.; Aitkin, Don (1986). Voting for the Australian State Upper Houses, 1890-1984. Canberra: Australian National University. ISBN 0-909779-18-X.
- Black, David; Bolton, Geoffrey (2001b). Biographical Register of Members of the Parliament of Western Australia. Vol. Two: 1930-1990 (Revised ed.). Parliament House: Parliament of Western Australia. ISBN 0731697839.
