= Members of the Western Australian Legislative Council, 1954–1956 =

This is a list of members of the Western Australian Legislative Council from 22 May 1954 to 21 May 1956. The chamber had 30 seats made up of ten provinces each electing three members, on a system of rotation whereby one-third of the members would retire at each biennial election.

Name	Party	Province	Term expires	Years in office
Don Barker	Labor	North	1958	1952–1956
Norm Baxter	Country	Central	1958	1950–1958; 1960–1983
George Bennetts	Labor	South-East	1958	1946–1965
Robert Boylen^{[1]}	Labor	South-East	1956	1947–1955
Les Craig	Liberal	South-West	1956	1934–1956
John Cunningham^{[1]}	Liberal	South-East	1956	1948–1954; 1955–1962
Evan Davies	Labor	West	1956	1947–1963
Leslie Diver	Country	Central	1956	1952–1974
Gilbert Fraser	Labor	West	1960	1928–1958
Jim Garrigan	Labor	South-East	1960	1954–1971
Sir Frank Gibson	Liberal	Suburban	1956	1942–1956
Arthur Griffith	Liberal	Suburban	1958	1953–1977
William Hall	Labor	North-East	1958	1938–1963
Harry Hearn^{[3]}	Liberal	Metropolitan	1960	1948–1956
Eric Heenan	Labor	North-East	1956	1936–1968
Charles Henning^{[2]}	Liberal	South-West	1960	1951–1955
James Hislop	Liberal	Metropolitan	1958	1941–1971
Ruby Hutchison	Labor	Suburban	1960	1954–1971
Ray Jones	Country	Midland	1956	1950–1967
Sir Charles Latham	Country	Central	1960	1946–1960
Frederick Lavery	Labor	West	1958	1952–1971
Les Logan	Country	Midland	1960	1947–1974
Anthony Loton	Country	South	1958	1944–1965
James Murray	Liberal	South-West	1958	1951–1965
Hugh Roche	Country	South	1960	1940–1960
Charles Simpson	Liberal	Midland	1958	1946–1963
Harry Strickland	Labor	North	1956	1950–1970
John Teahan	Labor	North-East	1960	1954–1965
Jack Thomson	Country	South	1956	1950–1974
Keith Watson	Liberal	Metropolitan	1956	1948–1968
Bill Willesee	Labor	North	1960	1954–1974
Francis Drake Willmott^{[2]}	Liberal	South-West	1960	1955–1974

== Notes ==
^{1} On 25 June 1955, South-East Province Labor MLC Robert Boylen died. Liberal candidate John Cunningham, who had represented the area until his defeat the previous year by Labor's Jim Garrigan, won the resulting by-election on 10 September 1955.
^{2} On 22 June 1955, South-West Province Liberal MLC Charles Henning died. Liberal candidate Francis Drake Willmott won the resulting by-election on 10 September 1955.
^{3} On 20 March 1956, Metropolitan Province Liberal MLC Harry Hearn died. Liberal candidate Reg Mattiske won the resulting by-election on 9 June 1956.

== Sources ==
- Black, David (1991). Legislative Council of Western Australia : membership register, electoral law and statistics, 1890-1989. Perth: Parliamentary History Project. ISBN 0-7309-3641-4.
- Hughes, Colin A.; Aitkin, Don (1986). Voting for the Australian State Upper Houses, 1890-1984. Canberra: Australian National University. ISBN 0-909779-18-X.
- Black, David; Bolton, Geoffrey (2001b). Biographical Register of Members of the Parliament of Western Australia. Vol. Two: 1930-1990 (Revised ed.). Parliament House: Parliament of Western Australia. ISBN 0731697839.
