= Members of the Western Australian Legislative Council, 1956–1958 =

This is a list of members of the Western Australian Legislative Council from 22 May 1956 to 21 May 1958. The chamber had 30 seats made up of ten provinces each electing three members, on a system of rotation whereby one-third of the members would retire at each biennial election.

Name	Party	Province	Term expires	Years in office
Don Barker^{[2]}	Labor	North	1958	1952–1956
Norm Baxter	Country	Central	1958	1950–1958; 1960–1983
George Bennetts	Labor	South-East	1958	1946–1965
John Cunningham	Liberal	South-East	1962	1948–1954; 1955–1962
Evan Davies	Labor	West	1962	1947–1963
Leslie Diver	Country	Central	1962	1952–1974
Gilbert Fraser	Labor	West	1960	1928–1958
Jim Garrigan	Labor	South-East	1960	1954–1971
Arthur Griffith	Liberal	Suburban	1958	1953–1977
William Hall	Labor	North-East	1958	1938–1963
Eric Heenan	Labor	North-East	1962	1936–1968
James Hislop	Liberal	Metropolitan	1958	1941–1971
Ruby Hutchison	Labor	Suburban	1960	1954–1971
George Jeffery	Labor	Suburban	1962	1956–1962
Ray Jones	Country	Midland	1962	1950–1967
Sir Charles Latham	Country	Central	1960	1946–1960
Frederick Lavery	Labor	West	1958	1952–1971
Les Logan	Country	Midland	1960	1947–1974
Anthony Loton	Country	South	1958	1944–1965
Graham MacKinnon	Liberal	South-West	1962	1956–1986
Reg Mattiske^{[1]}	Liberal	Metropolitan	1960	1956–1965
James Murray	Liberal	South-West	1958	1951–1965
Hugh Roche	Country	South	1960	1940–1960
Charles Simpson	Liberal	Midland	1958	1946–1963
Harry Strickland	Labor	North	1962	1950–1970
John Teahan	Labor	North-East	1960	1954–1965
Jack Thomson	Country	South	1962	1950–1974
Keith Watson	Liberal	Metropolitan	1962	1948–1968
William Willesee	Labor	North	1960	1954–1974
Francis Drake Willmott	Liberal	South-West	1960	1955–1974
Frank Wise^{[2]}	Labor	North	1958	1956–1971

== Notes ==
^{1} On 20 March 1956, Metropolitan Province Liberal MLC Harry Hearn had died. Liberal candidate Reg Mattiske won the resulting by-election on 9 June 1956.
^{2} On 18 July 1956, North Province Labor MLC Don Barker died. Labor candidate and former Premier Frank Wise won the resulting by-election on 22 September 1956.

== Sources ==
- Black, David (1991). Legislative Council of Western Australia : membership register, electoral law and statistics, 1890-1989. Perth: Parliamentary History Project. ISBN 0-7309-3641-4.
- Hughes, Colin A.; Aitkin, Don (1986). Voting for the Australian State Upper Houses, 1890-1984. Canberra: Australian National University. ISBN 0-909779-18-X.
- Black, David; Bolton, Geoffrey (2001b). Biographical Register of Members of the Parliament of Western Australia. Vol. Two: 1930-1990 (Revised ed.). Parliament House: Parliament of Western Australia. ISBN 0731697839.
