= Members of the Western Australian Legislative Council, 1968–1971 =

This is a list of members of the Western Australian Legislative Council from 22 May 1968 to 21 May 1971. The chamber had 30 seats made up of 15 provinces each electing two members, on a system of rotation whereby one-half of the members would retire at each triennial election.

Name	Party	Province	Term expires	Years in office
Charles Abbey	Liberal	West	1971	1958–1977
Norm Baxter	Country	Central	1971	1950–1958; 1960–1983
George Berry	Liberal	Lower North	1974	1968–1980
George Brand	Liberal	Lower North	1971	1965–1971
Roy Claughton	Labor	North Metropolitan	1974	1968–1980
Leslie Diver	Country	Central	1974	1952–1974
Jerry Dolan	Labor	South-East Metropolitan	1974	1963–1974
Vic Ferry	Liberal	South-West	1971	1965–1987
Jim Garrigan^{[2]}	Labor	South-East	1971	1954–1971
Arthur Griffith	Liberal	North Metropolitan	1971	1953–1977
Clive Griffiths	Liberal	South-East Metropolitan	1971	1965–1997
Jack Heitman	Liberal	Upper West	1971	1963–1977
James Hislop	Liberal	Metropolitan	1971	1941–1971
Edward House^{[2]}	Country	South	1971	1965–1971
John Hunt^{[1]}	Labor	North	1974	1971–1974
Ruby Hutchison	Labor	North-East Metropolitan	1971	1954–1971
Frederick Lavery^{[2]}	Labor	South Metropolitan	1971	1952–1971
Les Logan	Country	Upper West	1974	1947–1974
Graham MacKinnon	Liberal	Lower West	1974	1956–1986
Neil McNeill	Liberal	Lower West	1971	1965–1983
Ian Medcalf	Liberal	Metropolitan	1974	1968–1986
Thomas Perry	Country	Lower Central	1971	1965–1977
Harry Strickland^{[1]}	Labor	North	1974	1950–1970
Claude Stubbs	Labor	South-East	1974	1962–1980
Ron Thompson	Labor	South Metropolitan	1974	1959–1980
Sydney Thompson	Country	Lower Central	1974	1960–1974
Jack Thomson	Country	South	1974	1950–1974
Fred White	Country	West	1974	1967–1973
Bill Willesee	Labor	North-East Metropolitan	1974	1954–1974
Francis Drake Willmott	Liberal	South-West	1974	1955–1974
Frank Wise	Labor	North	1971	1956–1971

== Notes ==
^{1} On 31 December 1970, North Province Labor MLC Harry Strickland resigned. Labor candidate John Hunt won the resulting by-election on 20 February 1971.
^{2} Three retiring MLCs died in the period leading to the 1971 election, and their positions were not filled. These were Labor members Frederick Lavery (12 January 1971) and Jim Garrigan (5 April 1971), and Country Party member Edward House (1 January 1971).

== Sources ==
- Black, David (1991). Legislative Council of Western Australia : membership register, electoral law and statistics, 1890-1989. Perth: Parliamentary History Project. ISBN 0-7309-3641-4.
- Hughes, Colin A.; Aitkin, Don (1986). Voting for the Australian State Upper Houses, 1890-1984. Canberra: Australian National University. ISBN 0-909779-18-X.
- Black, David; Bolton, Geoffrey (2001b). Biographical Register of Members of the Parliament of Western Australia. Vol. Two: 1930-1990 (Revised ed.). Parliament House: Parliament of Western Australia. ISBN 0731697839.
