= Members of the Western Australian Legislative Council, 1965–1968 =

This is a list of members of the Western Australian Legislative Council from 22 May 1965 to 21 May 1968.

The term was the first to be conducted under the Constitution Acts Amendment Act (No.2) 1963 (No.72 of 1963), which abolished the 10 three-member provinces which had existed almost unaltered since 1900 and replaced them with 15 new two-member provinces, while abolishing the practice of having separate Legislative Council elections in May of every even-numbered year. Hence, members whose terms expired on 21 May 1971 were elected at the 1965 state general election.

The chamber as a result had 30 seats made up of 15 provinces each electing two members, on a system of rotation whereby one-half of the members would retire every three years.

Name	Party	Province	Term expires	Years in office
Charles Abbey	Liberal	West	1971	1958–1977
Norm Baxter	Country	Central	1971	1950–1958; 1960–1983
George Brand	Liberal	Lower North	1971	1965–1971
Leslie Diver	Country	Central	1968	1952–1974
Jerry Dolan	Labor	South-East Metropolitan	1968	1963–1974
Vic Ferry	Liberal	South-West	1971	1965–1987
Jim Garrigan	Labor	South-East	1971	1954–1971
Arthur Griffith	Liberal	North Metropolitan	1971	1953–1977
Clive Griffiths	Liberal	South-East Metropolitan	1971	1965–1997
Eric Heenan	Labor	Lower North	1968	1936–1968
Jack Heitman	Liberal	Upper West	1971	1963–1977
James Hislop	Liberal	Metropolitan	1971	1941–1971
Edward House	Country	South	1971	1965–1971
Ruby Hutchison	Labor	North-East Metropolitan	1971	1954–1971
Ray Jones^{[1]}	Country	West	1968	1950–1967
Frederick Lavery	Labor	South Metropolitan	1971	1952–1971
Les Logan	Country	Upper West	1968	1947–1974
Graham MacKinnon	Liberal	Lower West	1968	1956–1986
Neil McNeill	Liberal	Lower West	1971	1965–1983
Thomas Perry	Country	Lower Central	1971	1965–1977
Herbert R. Robinson	Liberal	North Metropolitan	1968	1962–1968
Harry Strickland	Labor	North	1968	1950–1970
Claude Stubbs	Labor	South-East	1968	1962–1980
Ron Thompson	Labor	South Metropolitan	1968	1959–1980
Sydney Thompson	Country	Lower Central	1968	1960–1974
Jack Thomson	Country	South	1968	1950–1974
Keith Watson	Liberal	Metropolitan	1968	1948–1968
Fred White^{[1]}	Country	West	1968	1967–1973
Bill Willesee	Labor	North-East Metropolitan	1968	1954–1974
Francis Drake Willmott	Liberal	South-West	1968	1955–1974
Frank Wise	Labor	North	1971	1956–1971

== Notes ==
^{1} On 3 September 1967, West Province (formerly Midland Province) Country MLC Ray Jones died. Country Party candidate Fred White won the resulting by-election on 21 October 1967.

== Sources ==
- Black, David (1991). Legislative Council of Western Australia : membership register, electoral law and statistics, 1890-1989. Perth: Parliamentary History Project. ISBN 0-7309-3641-4. (especially p. 6)
- Hughes, Colin A.; Aitkin, Don (1986). Voting for the Australian State Upper Houses, 1890-1984. Canberra: Australian National University. ISBN 0-909779-18-X.
- Black, David; Bolton, Geoffrey (2001b). Biographical Register of Members of the Parliament of Western Australia. Vol. Two: 1930-1990 (Revised ed.). Parliament House: Parliament of Western Australia. ISBN 0731697839.
