= Candidates of the 1965 Western Australian state election =

The 1965 Western Australian state election was held on 20 February 1965.

== Retiring Members ==
=== Labor ===
- George Bennetts (MLC) (South-East)
- John Teahan (MLC) (North-East)

=== LCL ===
- Reg Mattiske (MLC) (Metropolitan)
- James Murray (MLC) (South-West)

=== Country ===
- Anthony Loton (MLC) (South)

== Legislative Assembly ==
Sitting members are shown in bold text. Successful candidates are highlighted in the relevant colour. Where there is possible confusion, an asterisk (*) is also used.

Electorate	Held by	Labor candidate	LCL candidate	Country candidate	Other candidates
Albany	Labor	**Jack Hall**	Norman Swarbrick	Charles Johnson	
Avon	Country			**Harry Gayfer**	
Balcatta	Labor	**Herb Graham**	Terrence Browne		
Bayswater	Labor	**Merv Toms**	Walter Bonnett		
Beeloo	Labor	**Colin Jamieson**	Henry Watson		
Belmont	Labor	**James Hegney**	Boyd Buttsworth		
Blackwood	LCL		**John Hearman**		
Boulder-Eyre	Labor	**Arthur Moir**			
Bunbury	LCL	Edward Cooke	**Maurice Williams**		
Canning	Labor	**Don May**	Ross Elliott		Louis Raven (DLP)
Claremont	LCL	John Henshaw	**Harold Crommelin**		
Cockburn	Labor	**Henry Curran**			
Collie	Labor	**Harry May**	Edward Cocker		
Cottesloe	LCL	Richard Bryant	**Ross Hutchinson**		
Dale	LCL	Donald Culley	**Gerald Wild**		
Darling Range	LCL	Jack Metcalfe	**Ken Dunn**	Ray Owen	
East Melville	LCL		**John Hearman**		Louis Joseph (Ind)
Fremantle	Labor	**Harry Fletcher**	Ronald Shires		
Gascoyne	Labor	**Daniel Norton**	Stewart Maver		Neville Brandstater (Ind)
Geraldton	Labor	**Bill Sewell**	Charles Raynor		Raymond Goss (Ind)
Greenough	LCL		**David Brand**		
Kalgoorlie	Labor	**Tom Evans**			
Karrinyup	LCL	Stan Lapham	**Les Nimmo**		Gerardus Sappelli (DLP)
Katanning	Country			**Crawford Nalder**	
Kimberley	Labor	**John Rhatigan**	George Drysdale		
Maylands	Labor	**Edward Oldfield**	Bob Marshall		Francis Pownall (DLP)
Melville	Labor	**John Tonkin**	Albert Gainsford-Brackley		
Merredin-Yilgarn	Labor	**Lionel Kelly**	Jack Stewart	Kenneth Jones	
Moore	Country			**Edgar Lewis**	Albert Tonkin (Ind)
Mount Hawthorn	Labor	**Bill Hegney**	James Ring		
Mount Lawley	LCL	Mervyn Knight	**Ray O'Connor**		
Mount Marshall	Country			**George Cornell**	
Murchison	LCL	Tom Hartrey	**Richard Burt**		
Murray	LCL		**Ewart Runciman**		Dudley Tuckey (Ind)
Narrogin	Country			**William Manning**	Percy Munday (Ind)
Nedlands	LCL	Alastair Rae	**Charles Court**		
Northam	Labor	**Albert Hawke**	Claude Roediger		
Perth	Labor	**Stanley Heal**	Peter Durack		Terence Merchant (DLP)
Pilbara	Labor	**Arthur Bickerton**	David Hughes		
Roe	Country			**Tom Hart**	
South Perth	LCL		**Bill Grayden**		
Stirling	Country			**Clayton Mitchell**	
Subiaco	LCL	Frank Baden-Powell	**Hugh Guthrie**		John Martyr (DLP)
Swan	Labor	**John Brady**	Lindsay Ellis		Gordon Murray (Comm)
Toodyay	Country			**James Craig**	Charles Hooper (Ind)
Vasse	LCL	Colin Smith	**William Bovell**		
Victoria Park	Labor	**Ron Davies**	Nicholas Di Lello		
Warren	Labor	**Joseph Rowberry**	William Brockman	Gordon Errington	
Wellington	LCL	Ivor Hill	**William Bovell**		
Wembley	LCL	Denis Kemp	**Guy Henn**		

== Legislative Council ==
Sitting members are shown in bold text. Successful candidates are highlighted in the relevant colour. Where there is possible confusion, an asterisk (*) is also used.

Electorate	Held by	Labor candidate	LCL candidate	Country candidate	Other candidates
Central	Country			**Norm Baxter**	
Lower Central	Country			**Thomas Perry**	Bill Stretch (Ind)
Lower North	Labor	**David Dellar**	George Brand		
Lower West	LCL	Fred Crockenberg	**Neil McNeill**		
Metropolitan	LCL	Annette Aarons	**James Hislop**		
North	Labor	**Frank Wise**	Francis Cameron		
North Metropolitan	LCL	Ron Bertram	**Arthur Griffith**		Frederick Simpson (Ind)
North-East Metropolitan	Labor	**Ruby Hutchison**	Douglas Klem		
South	Country	Robin Faulkner		Edward House	Francis Gomm (Ind)
South Metropolitan	Labor	**Frederick Lavery**	George Lithgo		
South-East	Labor	**Jim Garrigan**	John Cunningham		
South-East Metropolitan	LCL	Ethel Douglas	**Clive Griffiths**		
South-West	LCL	Raymond Halden	Vic Ferry		
Upper West	Country	Oliver Sutherland		**Jack Heitman**	
West	LCL	Newell Jamieson	**Charles Abbey**		

== See also ==
- Members of the Western Australian Legislative Assembly, 1962–1965
- Members of the Western Australian Legislative Assembly, 1965–1968
- Members of the Western Australian Legislative Council, 1962–1965
- Members of the Western Australian Legislative Council, 1965–1968
- 1965 Western Australian state election
