= Candidates of the 1968 Western Australian state election =

The 1968 Western Australian state election was held on 23 March 1968.

== Retiring Members ==
=== Labor ===
- James Hegney MLA (Belmont)
- Albert Hawke MLA (Northam)
- Bill Hegney MLA (Mount Hawthorn)
- Lionel Kelly MLA (Merredin-Yilgarn)
- Harry May MLA (Collie)
- Joseph Rowberry MLA (Warren)
- Henry Curran MLA (Cockburn)

=== LCL ===
- Les Nimmo MLA (Karrinyup)
- Bill Crommelin MLA (Claremont)
- Keith Watson MLC (Metropolitan)

== Legislative Assembly ==
Sitting members are shown in bold text. Successful candidates are highlighted in the relevant colour. Where there is possible confusion, an asterisk (*) is also used.

Electorate	Held by	Labor candidate	LCL candidate	Country candidate	Other candidates
Albany	Labor	**Jack Hall**	Henry Ayers		
Ascot	Labor	**Merv Toms**	Douglas Anderson		
Avon	Country			**Harry Gayfer**	
Balcatta	Labor	**Herb Graham**	Anthony Scolaro		
Belmont	Labor	Colin Jamieson	Bruce Tomlinson		
Blackwood	LCL		**John Hearman**	Ron Kitney	
Boulder-Dundas	Labor	**Arthur Moir**			
Bunbury	LCL	Alexandra White	**Maurice Williams**		John Guidera (DLP)
Canning	LCL	Tom Bateman	**Ross Elliott**		Lydia Obbes (DLP); Melford Roe (Ind)
Clontarf	LCL	Don May	Paul Buddee		John Martyr (DLP); Ian Skipworth (Ind)
Cockburn	Labor	Don Taylor	Stanley Elliman		
Collie	Labor	Tom Jones	Bob Pike		John Davidson (Ind)
Cottesloe	LCL	Christopher Caldwell	**Ross Hutchinson**		Lola Griggs (Ind)
Dale	LCL	James Wolfe	**Cyril Rushton**		
Darling Range	LCL	Alick Smith	**Ken Dunn**	George Spriggs; Daniel Varney	
East Melville	LCL		**Des O'Neil**		Victor Williams (CPA); Ralph Von Paleske (Ind)
Floreat	LCL	Lyla Elliott	**Andrew Mensaros**	George Gummow	Bernard Flanagan (DLP)
Fremantle	Labor	**Harry Fletcher**			William Kenneally (DLP)
Gascoyne	Labor	**Daniel Norton**	Peter Butler		Neville Brandstater (Ind)
Geraldton	Labor	**Bill Sewell**	Phillip Cooper		
Greenough	LCL		**David Brand**		
Kalgoorlie	Labor	**Tom Evans**			
Karrinyup	LCL	Stan Lapham	John Waghorne		Arthur White (DLP)
Katanning	Country			**Crawford Nalder**	
Kimberley	Labor	**John Rhatigan**	Alan Ridge		
Maylands	LCL	John Harman	**Bob Marshall**		Francis Pownall (DLP); Cornelis de Bruin (Ind)
Melville	Labor	**John Tonkin**	Albert Box		
Merredin-Yilgarn	Labor	Jim Brown	Jack Stewart	Geoffrey Telfer	Raymond Evans (Ind)
Mirrabooka	LCL	Kevin Parker	Doug Cash		John Poole (DLP)
Moore	Country			**Edgar Lewis**	Albert Tonkin (Ind)
Mount Hawthorn	Labor	Ron Bertram	James Ring		Gavan O'Connor (DLP)
Mount Lawley	LCL	Patrick Weir	**Ray O'Connor**		
Mount Marshall	Country			**Ray McPharlin**	
Murchison-Eyre	LCL		**Richard Burt**		
Murray	LCL	Fred Crockenberg	**Ewart Runciman**		
Narrogin	Country			**William Manning**	
Nedlands	LCL	Eric Hicks	**Charles Court**		
Northam	Labor	Ken McIver	Claude Roediger	Maurice Armstrong	
Perth	LCL	Terry Burke	**Peter Durack**		Paul Ritter (Ind); William Spence (DLP)
Pilbara	Labor	**Arthur Bickerton**			
Roe	Country	John Jehu	Mel Bungey	**Bill Young**	
South Perth	LCL		**Bill Grayden**		Brian Peachey (DLP)
Stirling	Country			**Clayton Mitchell**	
Subiaco	LCL	Ronnay Foster	**Hugh Guthrie**		Jacqueline Lander (Ind)
Swan	Labor	**John Brady**	John Pitsikas		
Toodyay	Country	Edmond Hewett		**James Craig**	
Vasse	LCL		**William Bovell**		
Victoria Park	Labor	**Ron Davies**			
Warren	Labor	David Evans	Gordon Thompson		Francis Dwyer (DLP)
Wellington	LCL		**Iven Manning**		
Wembley	LCL		**Guy Henn**		

== Legislative Council ==
Sitting members are shown in bold text. Successful candidates are highlighted in the relevant colour. Where there is possible confusion, an asterisk (*) is also used.

Electorate	Held by	Labor candidate	LCL candidate	Country candidate	Other candidates
Central	Country			**Leslie Diver**	
Lower Central	Country	Alfred Jacobs		**Sydney Thompson**	
Lower North	Labor	**Eric Heenan**	George Berry		Dennis Sands (DLP)
Lower West	LCL		**Graham MacKinnon**		
Metropolitan	LCL		Ian Medcalf		
North	Labor	**Harry Strickland**			
North Metropolitan	LCL	Roy Claughton	**Herbert Robinson**		
North-East Metropolitan	Labor	**William Willesee**			
South	Country			**Jack Thomson**	
South-East	Labor	**Claude Stubbs**			
South Metropolitan	Labor	**Ron Thompson**	Albert Gainsford-Brackley		
South-East Metropolitan	Labor	**Jerry Dolan**	Nigel Guest		Alan Crofts (DLP)
South West	LCL		**Francis Willmott**		
Upper West	Country			**Les Logan**	
West	Country	Owen Hanlon		**Fred White**	

== See also ==
- Members of the Western Australian Legislative Assembly, 1965–1968
- Members of the Western Australian Legislative Assembly, 1968–1971
- Members of the Western Australian Legislative Council, 1965–1968
- Members of the Western Australian Legislative Council, 1968–1971
- 1968 Western Australian state election
