= 1960 Western Australian Legislative Council election =

Elections were held in the Australian state of Western Australia on 30 April 1960 to elect 10 of the 30 members of the state's Legislative Council.

== Results ==
=== Legislative Council ===
Western Australian state election, 30 April 1960 Legislative Council
Enrolled voters	162,662				
Votes cast	65,821		Turnout	44.5	+1.3
Informal votes	498		Informal	0.8	-0.3
Summary of votes by party
Party	Primary votes	%	Swing	Seats won	Seats held
Labor	29,830	45.7	+8.0	5	13
Liberal and Country	23,718	36.3	-14.0	2	9
Country	10,829	16.6	+7.7	3	8
Independent	946	1.5	+0.7	0	0
Total	65,323			10	30

== Retiring Members ==
=== Country ===
- Charles Latham (Central)
- Hugh Roche (South)

== Candidates ==
Province	Held by	Labor candidates	LCL candidates	Country candidates	Independent candidates
Central	Country		Arthur Kelly	Norm Baxter*; Arthur Latham; Allan McLean	
Metropolitan	LCL	Percy Munday	Reg Mattiske		
Midland	Country	Oliver Sutherland		Les Logan	
North	Labor	Bill Willesee	Robert Lukis		
North-East	Labor	John Teahan	David Hoar		Albert Gerick (Ind.)
South	Country		Charles Bolt	Sydney Thompson*; Bill Robinson	Joseph Weir (Ind.)
South-East	Labor	Jim Garrigan	Percival Millington	Alfred Walker	
South-West	LCL		Frank Willmott		
Suburban	Labor	Ruby Hutchison	Alfred Rosser		
West	Labor	Ron Thompson	Louis Joseph		

== Election results ==
=== Central ===
1960 Western Australian Legislative Council election: Central
Party	Candidate	Votes	%	±%
Liberal and Country	Arthur Kelly	2,314	35.6	
Country	Norm Baxter	2,258	34.7	
Country	Arthur Latham	1,230	18.9	
Country	Allan McLean	705	10.8	
Total formal votes		6,507	98.8	
Informal votes		79	1.2	
Turnout		6,586	50.2	
Two-candidate-preferred result
Country	Norm Baxter	3,661	56.3	
Liberal and Country	Arthur Kelly	2,846	43.7	
Country hold		Swing		

=== Metropolitan ===
1960 Western Australian Legislative Council election: Metropolitan
Party	Candidate	Votes	%	±%
Liberal and Country	Reg Mattiske	7,728	59.7	
Labor	Percy Munday	5,215	40.3	
Total formal votes		12,943	99.4	
Informal votes		71	0.6	
Turnout		13,014	32.1	
Liberal and Country hold		Swing		

=== Midland ===
1960 Western Australian Legislative Council election, Midland
Party	Candidate	Votes	%	±%
Country	Les Logan	2,121	75.1	
Labor	Oliver Sutherland	704	24.9	
Total formal votes		2,825	99.4	
Informal votes		17	0.6	
Turnout		2,842	52.8	
Country hold		Swing		

=== North ===
1960 Western Australian Legislative Council election: North
Party	Candidate	Votes	%	±%
Labor	Bill Willesee	959	65.1	
Liberal and Country	Robert Lukis	515	34.9	
Total formal votes		1,474	99.5	
Informal votes		8	0.5	
Turnout		1,482	76.8	
Labor hold		Swing		

=== North-East ===
1960 Western Australian Legislative Council election: North-East
Party	Candidate	Votes	%	±%
Labor	John Teahan	1,682	57.7	
Liberal and Country	David Hoar	927	31.8	
Independent	Albert Gerick	304	10.4	
Total formal votes		2,913	99.1	
Informal votes		25	0.9	
Turnout		2,938	60.8	
Labor hold		Swing	N/A	

- Preferences were not distributed.

=== South ===
1960 Western Australian Legislative Council election: South
Party	Candidate	Votes	%	±%
Liberal and Country	Charles Bolt	1,928	31.4	
Country	Bill Robinson	1,903	31.0	
Country	Sydney Thompson	1,663	27.1	
Independent	Joseph Weir	642	10.5	
Total formal votes		6,136	98.9	
Informal votes		66	1.1	
Turnout		6,202	55.7	
Two-candidate-preferred result
Country	Sydney Thompson	3,724	60.7	
Liberal and Country	Charles Bolt	2,412	39.3	
Country hold		Swing	N/A	

=== South-East ===
1960 Western Australian Legislative Council election: South-East
Party	Candidate	Votes	%	±%
Labor	Jim Garrigan	2,401	55.5	
Liberal and Country	Percival Millington	978	22.6	
Country	Alfred Walker	949	21.9	
Total formal votes		4,328	99.1	
Informal votes		39	0.9	
Turnout		4,367	61.8	
Labor hold		Swing		

- Preferences were not distributed.

=== South-West ===
1960 Western Australian Legislative Council election: South-West
Party	Candidate	Votes	%	±%
Liberal and Country	Francis Drake Willmott	unopposed		
Liberal and Country hold		Swing		

=== Suburban ===
1960 Western Australian Legislative Council election: Suburban
Party	Candidate	Votes	%	±%
Labor	Ruby Hutchison	9,776	57.5	
Liberal and Country	Alfred Rosser	7,241	42.5	
Total formal votes		17,017	99.3	
Informal votes		116	0.7	
Turnout		17,133	42.9	
Labor hold		Swing		

=== West ===
1960 Western Australian Legislative Council election: West
Party	Candidate	Votes	%	±%
Labor	Ron Thompson	6,779	60.4	
Liberal and Country	Louis Joseph	4,401	39.4	
Total formal votes		11,180	99.3	
Informal votes		77	0.7	
Turnout		11,257	47.2	
Labor hold		Swing		

== See also ==
- Members of the Western Australian Legislative Council, 1960–1962
