= 1958 Western Australian Legislative Council election =

Elections were held in the Australian state of Western Australia on 10 May 1958 to elect 10 of the 30 members of the state's Legislative Council.

== Results ==
=== Legislative Council ===
Western Australian state election, 10 May 1958 Legislative Council
Enrolled voters	150,671				
Votes cast	53,284		Turnout	43.2	–30.1
Informal votes	609		Informal	1.1	-0.6
Summary of votes by party
Party	Primary votes	%	Swing	Seats won	Seats held
Liberal and Country	26,472	50.3	–2.0	4	9
Labor	19,869	37.7	–8.3	4	13
Country	4,670	8.9	*	2	8
Democratic Labor	1,253	2.4	*	0	0
Independent	411	0.8	–1.0	0	0
Total	52,675			10	30

== Retiring Members ==
- No sitting MLC's retired at this election.

== Candidates ==
Province	Held by	Labor candidates	LCL candidates	Country candidates	Independent candidates
Central	Country		Charles Abbey	Norm Baxter	
Metropolitan	LCL	Alfred Buggins	James Hislop		
Midland	Country		Francis Horwood	Charles Simpson	
North	Labor	Frank Wise			
North-East	Labor	William Hall	Ian Rosenberg	Lincoln Sullivan	
South	Country			Anthony Loton	
South-East	Labor	George Bennetts			Harold Illingworth (Ind.)
South-West	LCL		James Murray		
Suburban	LCL	Herbert Fletcher	Arthur Griffith		Joseph Martin (DLP)
West	Labor	Frederick Lavery	James Collins		

== Election results ==
=== Central ===
1958 Western Australian Legislative Council election: Central
Party	Candidate	Votes	%	±%
Liberal and Country	Charles Abbey	2,662	51.0	
Country	Norm Baxter	2,559	49.0	
Total formal votes		5,221	98.7	
Informal votes		66	1.3	
Turnout		5,287	44.7	
Liberal and Country gain from Country		Swing		

=== Metropolitan ===
1958 Western Australian Legislative Council election: Metropolitan
Party	Candidate	Votes	%	±%
Liberal and Country	James Hislop	11,313	64.0	
Labor	Alfred Buggins	6,360	36.0	
Total formal votes		17,673	99.2	
Informal votes		140	0.8	
Turnout		17,813	45.4	
Liberal and Country hold		Swing		

=== Midland ===
1958 Western Australian Legislative Council election: Midland
Party	Candidate	Votes	%	±%
Country	Charles Simpson	1,660	66.6	
Liberal and Country	Francis Horwood	834	33.4	
Total formal votes		2,494	99.2	
Informal votes		21	0.8	
Turnout		2,515	47.5	
Country hold		Swing		

=== North ===
1958 Western Australian Legislative Council election: North
Party	Candidate	Votes	%	±%
Labor	Frank Wise	unopposed		
Labor hold		Swing		

=== North-East ===
1958 Western Australian Legislative Council election: North-East
Party	Candidate	Votes	%	±%
Labor	William Hall	1,378	50.5	
Liberal and Country	Ian Rosenberg	898	32.9	
Country	Lincoln Sullivan	451	16.5	
Total formal votes		2,727	98.8	
Informal votes		33	1.2	
Turnout		2,760	62.7	
Labor hold		Swing		

- Preferences were not distributed.

=== South ===
1958 Western Australian Legislative Council election: South
Party	Candidate	Votes	%	±%
Country	Anthony Loton	unopposed		
Country hold		Swing		

=== South-East ===
1958 Western Australian Legislative Council election: South-East
Party	Candidate	Votes	%	±%
Labor	George Bennetts	2,031	83.2	
Independent	Harold Illingworth	411	16.8	
Total formal votes		2,442	99.1	
Informal votes		21	0.9	
Turnout		2,463	38.0	
Labor hold		Swing		

=== South-West ===
1958 Western Australian Legislative Council election: South-West
Party	Candidate	Votes	%	±%
Liberal and Country	James Murray	unopposed		
Liberal and Country hold		Swing		

=== Suburban ===
1958 Western Australian Legislative Council election: Suburban
Party	Candidate	Votes	%	±%
Liberal and Country	Arthur Griffith	9,392	53.8	
Labor	Herbert Fletcher	6,817	39.0	
Democratic Labor	Joseph Martin	1,253	7.2	
Total formal votes		17,462	98.5	
Informal votes		257	1.5	
Turnout		17,719	49.0	
Liberal and Country hold		Swing		

- Preferences were not distributed.

=== West ===
1958 Western Australian Legislative Council election: West
Party	Candidate	Votes	%	±%
Labor	Frederick Lavery	3,283	70.5	
Liberal and Country	James Collins	1,373	29.5	
Total formal votes		4,656	98.5	
Informal votes		71	1.5	
Turnout		4,727	23.6	
Labor hold		Swing		

== See also ==
- Members of the Western Australian Legislative Council, 1958–1960
