= 1956 Western Australian Legislative Council election =

Elections were held in the Australian state of Western Australia on 7 April 1956 to elect 10 of the 30 members of the state's Legislative Council.

== Results ==
=== Legislative Council ===
Western Australian state election, 7 April 1956 Legislative Council
Enrolled voters	100,773				
Votes cast	50,935		Turnout	73.3	+24.3
Informal votes	855		Informal	1.7	+0.7
Summary of votes by party
Party	Primary votes	%	Swing	Seats won	Seats held
Liberal and Country	26,178	52.3	+12.1	3	9
Labor	23,018	46.0	–9.0	4	13
Country	*	*	*	3	8
Independent	884	1.8	–2.2	0	0
Total	50,080			10	30

== Retiring Members ==
=== LCL ===
- Les Craig (South-West)
- Frank Gibson (Suburban)

== Candidates ==
Province	Held by	Labor candidates	LCL candidates	Country candidates	Independent candidates
Central	Country			Leslie Diver	
Metropolitan	LCL	Herbert Fletcher	Keith Watson		Ray O'Connor (Ind. Lib)
Midland	Country			Ray Jones	
North	Labor	Harry Strickland	Edmund Webb		
North-East	Labor	Eric Heenan	James Boyd		
South	Country			Jack Thomson	
South-East	LCL	Archibald McGillivray	John Cunningham		
South-West	LCL	Ernest Stapleton	Graham MacKinnon		
Suburban	LCL	George Jeffery	William McPherson		
West	Labor	Evan Davies			

== Election results ==
=== Central ===
1956 Western Australian Legislative Council election: Central
Party	Candidate	Votes	%	±%
Country	Leslie Diver	unopposed		
Country hold		Swing		

=== Metropolitan ===
1956 Western Australian Legislative Council election: Metropolitan
Party	Candidate	Votes	%	±%
Liberal and Country	Keith Watson	8,873	59.6	N/A
Labor	Herbert Fletcher	5,127	34.5	+34.5
Independent Liberal	Ray O'Connor	884	5.9	+5.9
Total formal votes		14,884	98.2	N/A
Informal votes		275	1.8	N/A
Turnout		15,159	73.0	N/A
Liberal and Country hold		Swing	N/A	

- Preferences were not distributed.

=== Midland ===
1956 Western Australian Legislative Council election: Midland
Party	Candidate	Votes	%	±%
Country	Ray Jones	unopposed		
Country hold		Swing		

=== North ===
1956 Western Australian Legislative Council election: North
Party	Candidate	Votes	%	±%
Labor	Harry Strickland	906	63.7	+12.2
Liberal and Country	Edmund Webb	517	36.3	+2.7
Total formal votes		1,423	98.7	+1.4
Informal votes		18	1.3	−1.4
Turnout		1,423	82.4	+3.4
Labor hold		Swing	N/A	

=== North-East ===
1956 Western Australian Legislative Council election: North-East
Party	Candidate	Votes	%	±%
Labor	Eric Heenan	2,113	65.8	+7.7
Liberal and Country	James Boyd	1,098	34.2	−7.7
Total formal votes		3,211	98.2	−0.8
Informal votes		58	1.8	+0.8
Turnout		3,269	75.1	+2.0
Labor hold		Swing	+7.7	

=== South ===
1956 Western Australian Legislative Council election South
Party	Candidate	Votes	%	±%
Country	Jack Thomson	unopposed		
Country hold		Swing		

=== South-East ===
1956 Western Australian Legislative Council election: South-East
Party	Candidate	Votes	%	±%
Liberal and Country	John Cunningham	2,225	51.0	+3.3
Labor	Archibald McGillivray	2,141	49.0	−3.3
Total formal votes		4,366	98.9	+0.1
Informal votes		53	1.1	−0.1
Turnout		4,419	75.9	+12.1
Liberal and Country hold		Swing	+3.3	

=== South-West ===
1956 Western Australian Legislative Council election: South-West
Party	Candidate	Votes	%	±%
Liberal and Country	Graham MacKinnon	4,457	59.8	N/A
Labor	Ernest Stapleton	2,992	40.2	+40.2
Total formal votes		7,449	98.5	N/A
Informal votes		115	1.5	N/A
Turnout		7,564	67.7	N/A
Liberal and Country hold		Swing	N/A	

=== Suburban ===
1956 Western Australian Legislative Council election: Suburban
Party	Candidate	Votes	%	±%
Labor	George Jeffery	9,739	52.0	+4.0
Liberal and Country	William McPherson	9,008	48.0	−4.0
Total formal votes		18,747	98.2	−1.0
Informal votes		336	1.8	+1.0
Turnout		19,083	74.5	+25.7
Labor gain from Liberal and Country		Swing	+4.0	

=== West ===
1956 Western Australian Legislative Council election: West
Party	Candidate	Votes	%	±%
Labor	Evan Davies	unopposed		
Labor hold		Swing		

== See also ==
- Members of the Western Australian Legislative Council, 1956–1958
