= 1962 Western Australian Legislative Council election =

State election in Australia

Elections were held in the Australian state of Western Australia on 12 May 1962 to elect 10 of the 30 members of the state's Legislative Council. This was the last time the Legislative Council elections were held separately to those of the Legislative Assembly.

== Results ==
=== Legislative Council ===
Western Australian state election, 12 May 1962 Legislative Council
Enrolled voters	110,448				
Votes cast	46,014		Turnout	41.7	–2.8
Informal votes	193		Informal	0.4	–0.4
Summary of votes by party
Party	Primary votes	%	Swing	Seats won	Seats held
Liberal and Country	26,769	58.4	+18.6	3	10
Labor	18,988	41.4	–0.7	4	13
Country	*	*	*	3	7
Independent Liberal	64	0.1	+0.1	0	0
Total	45,821			10	30

== Retiring Members ==
No MLCs retired at this election.

== Candidates ==
Province	Held by	Labor candidates	LCL candidates	Country candidates	Independent candidates
Central	Country			Leslie Diver	
Metropolitan	LCL	Percy Munday	Keith Watson		
Midland	Country			Ray Jones	
North	Labor	Harry Strickland			
North-East	Labor	Eric Heenan	Grahame Jonas		James Collins (Ind. Liberal)
South	Country			Jack Thomson	
South-East	LCL	Claude Stubbs	John Cunningham		
South-West	LCL	Daniel O'Keeffe	Graham MacKinnon		
Suburban	Labor	George Jeffery	Herbert Robinson		
West	Labor	Evan Davies			

== Results by Province ==
=== Central ===
Western Australian Legislative Council election, 1962: Central Province
Party	Candidate	Votes	%	±%
Country	Leslie Diver	unopposed		
Country hold		Swing		

=== Metropolitan ===
Western Australian Legislative Council election, 1962: Metropolitan Province
Party	Candidate	Votes	%	±%
Liberal and Country	Keith Watson	10,862	70.1	+10.4
Labor	Percy Munday	4,622	29.9	−10.4
Total formal votes		15,484	99.5	+0.1
Informal votes		71	0.5	−0.1
Turnout		15,555	38.4	+6.3
Liberal and Country hold		Swing	+10.4	

=== Midland ===
Western Australian Legislative Council election, 1962: Midland Province
Party	Candidate	Votes	%	±%
Country	Ray Jones	unopposed		
Country hold		Swing		

=== North ===
Western Australian Legislative Council election, 1962: North Province
Party	Candidate	Votes	%	±%
Labor	Harry Strickland	unopposed		
Labor hold		Swing		

=== North-East ===
Western Australian Legislative Council election, 1962: North-East Province
Party	Candidate	Votes	%	±%
Labor	Eric Heenan	1,868	62.2	+4.5
Liberal and Country	Grahame Jonas	1,072	35.7	+3.9
Independent Liberal	James Collins	64	2.1	+2.1
Total formal votes		3,004	99.6	+0.5
Informal votes		11	0.4	−0.5
Turnout		3,015	51.9	−8.9
Labor hold		Swing	N/A	

=== South ===
Western Australian Legislative Council election, 1962: South Province
Party	Candidate	Votes	%	±%
Country	Jack Thomson	unopposed		
Country hold		Swing	N/A	

=== South-East ===
Western Australian Legislative Council election, 1962: South-East
Party	Candidate	Votes	%	±%
Labor	Claude Stubbs	1,682	51.6	−3.9
Liberal and Country	John Cunningham	1,576	48.4	+25.8
Total formal votes		3,258	99.7	+0.6
Informal votes		10	0.3	−0.6
Turnout		3,268	60.7	−1.1
Labor gain from Liberal and Country		Swing	N/A	

=== South-West ===
Western Australian Legislative Council election, 1962: South-West
Party	Candidate	Votes	%	±%
Liberal and Country	Graham MacKinnon	3,664	65.1	−34.9
Labor	Daniel O'Keefe	1,964	34.9	+34.9
Total formal votes		5,628	99.9	
Informal votes		20	0.1	
Turnout		5,648	38.2	
Liberal and Country hold		Swing	N/A	

=== Suburban ===
Western Australian Legislative Council election, 1962: Suburban Province
Party	Candidate	Votes	%	±%
Liberal and Country	Herbert Robinson	9,595	52.0	+9.5
Labor	George Jeffery	8,852	48.0	−9.5
Total formal votes		18,447	99.6	+0.3
Informal votes		81	0.4	−0.3
Turnout		18,528	42.2	−0.7
Liberal and Country gain from Labor		Swing	+9.5	

=== West ===
Western Australian Legislative Council election, 1962: West Province
Party	Candidate	Votes	%	±%
Labor	Evan Davies	unopposed		
Labor hold		Swing		

== See also ==
- 1962 Western Australian state election
