= Bill Withers (politician) =

Australian politician

William Robert Withers (born 8 August 1931) is a former Australian politician.

He was born in Sydney to butcher Robert Stephen Withers and Elsie Mary McPharland. He attended Kogarah Primary School and then Sydney Technical High School, graduating in 1947. He worked as a fishing and tourist guide before joining the Royal Australian Air Force in 1948, serving until 1957. On 3 July 1954, he married Judith Mary Wakefield in Werribee; they had three children. From 1956 until 1964 he was a senior cloud seeding officer in a joint RAAF-CSIRO operation. In 1964 he moved to Kununurra, becoming a partner in a general store and then a motor dealership. From 1966 he rain a jewellery store.

He served on Wyndham-East Kimberley Shire Council from 1965 to 1971. In September 1970 he joined the Liberal Party, and four days later he was endorsed for the Western Australian Legislative Council's North Province. He was a backbencher throughout his time in parliament, and in 1981 he resigned from the Liberal Party due to his disagreement with an electoral redistribution. He resigned from the Council in 1982.

Western Australian Legislative Council
Preceded by Frank Wise	Member for North Province; 1971–1982; Served alongside: John Hunt, John Tozer, Peter Dowding	Succeeded by Tom Stephens
