= Tonkin ministry (Western Australia) =

The Tonkin Ministry was the 25th Ministry of the Government of Western Australia, led by Labor Premier John Tonkin and deputy Herb Graham (Don Taylor replaced Graham following his resignation on 30 May 1973). It commenced on 3 March 1971, eleven days after the Brand–Nalder Ministry, led by Premier David Brand of the Liberal Party, was defeated at the 1971 election. The ministry was followed by the Court–McPharlin Ministry on 8 April 1974 after the Labor Party lost government at the state election held on 31 March.

As was the norm for Labor ministries, the caucus consisting of all parliamentary members elected the ministers, and the Premier then allocated portfolios.

== First Ministry ==
On 3 March 1971, the Governor, Major-General Sir Douglas Kendrew, constituted the Ministry. He designated 12 principal executive offices of the Government and appointed the following ministers to their positions, who served until a reshuffle on 30 May 1973. Four reshuffles took place—on 12 October 1971, following the resignation of Ron Bertram (due to ill health); a minor reshuffle amongst existing ministers on 6 July 1972; on 7 February 1973 following the resignation of William Willesee (also due to ill health); and on 30 May 1973 following the resignation of Deputy Premier Herb Graham to chair the Licensing Board.

The list below is ordered by decreasing seniority within the Cabinet, as indicated by the Government Gazette and the Hansard index. The members of the Ministry were:

Office	Minister
Premier; Treasurer (from 12 October 1971); Minister for Education (until 12 October 1971); Minister for Environmental Protection (until 12 October 1971); Minister for Cultural Affairs	John Tonkin, Dip.Tchg., FAIA, MLA
Deputy Premier; Minister for Industrial Development and Decentralisation; Minister for Town Planning (until 6 July 1972); Minister for the North-West (from 12 October 1971)	Herb Graham, MLA
(until 12 October 1971:) Treasurer Minister for Forests Minister for Tourism (from 12 October 1971:) Minister for Education Attorney-General Assistant to the Treasurer Minister for Recreation (from 6 July 1972)	Tom Evans, LL.B., MLA
Leader of the Government in the Legislative Council; Minister for Community Welfare	William Willesee, Dip.Acctg., MLC (until 7 February 1973)
Minister for Police; Minister for Transport; Minister for Railways (from 12 October 1971); Leader of the Government in the Legislative Council (from 7 February 1973)	Jerry Dolan, MLC
Minister for Mines; Minister for the North-West (until 12 October 1971); Minister for Electricity (from 12 October 1971); Minister for Fuel (from 6 July 1972)	Donald May, MLA
Minister for Works; Minister for Water Supplies; Minister for Electricity (until 12 October 1971); Minister for Traffic Safety (from 6 July 1972)	Colin Jamieson, MLA
Minister for Lands; Minister for Agriculture; Minister for Immigration (until 7 February 1973); Minister for Forests (from 12 October 1971)	David Evans, BA, MLA
Minister for Health; Minister for Environmental Protection (from 12 October 1971); Minister for Fisheries and Fauna (until 6 July 1972); Minister for Town Planning (from 6 July 1972) (until 12 October 1971:) Minister for Prices Control Minister for Consumer Protection	Ron Davies, MLA
Minister for Labour; Minister for Housing (until 12 October 1971); Minister for Immigration (from 7 February 1973) (from 12 October 1971:) Minister for Prices Control Minister for Consumer Protection Minister for Tourism	Don Taylor, BA, DipEd, MLA
Attorney-General; Minister for Railways	Ron Bertram, LL.B., Dip.Acctg., AASA, MLA (until 1 October 1971)
Chief Secretary; Minister for Local Government	Claude Stubbs, MLC
Minister for Housing; Minister for Fuel (until 6 July 1972); Minister for Fisheries and Fauna (from 6 July 1972)	Arthur Bickerton, MLA (from 12 October 1971)
Minister for Community Welfare	Ron Thompson, MLC (from 7 February 1973)

== Second Ministry ==
Following the resignation of Deputy Premier Herb Graham, a major reshuffle took place on 30 May 1973. These 12 ministers served until the end of the Tonkin Ministry on 8 April 1974.

Office	Minister
Premier; Treasurer; Minister for Cultural Affairs	John Tonkin, Dip.Tchg., FAIA, MLA
Deputy Premier; Minister for Development and Decentralisation	Don Taylor, BA, DipEd, MLA
Attorney-General; Assistant to the Treasurer; Minister for Recreation	Tom Evans, LL.B., MLA
Leader of the Government in the Legislative Council; Minister for Education; Minister for Transport; Minister for Railways	Jerry Dolan, MLC
Minister for Mines; Minister for Electricity; Minister for Fuel	Donald May, MLA
Minister for Works; Minister for Water Supplies; Minister for Traffic Safety	Colin Jamieson, MLA
Minister for Lands; Minister for Agriculture; Minister for Forests	David Evans, BA, MLA
Minister for Environmental Protection; Minister for Health; Minister for Town Planning	Ron Davies, MLA
Chief Secretary; Minister for Local Government	Claude Stubbs, MLC
Minister for Housing; Minister for Fisheries and Fauna; Minister for the North-West	Arthur Bickerton, MLA
Minister for Police; Minister for Community Welfare; Minister for Tourism	Ron Thompson, MLC
Minister for Labour; Minister for Immigration; Minister for Prices Control; Minister for Consumer Protection	John Harman, MLA

== Shadow Ministry ==
While serving no formal status, the Tonkin shadow ministry was a Shadow Cabinet led by the Opposition Leader and leader of the Labor Party, John Tonkin, in the Parliament of Western Australia. It lasted from March 1974 until 15 April 1976, when Tonkin stepped down at the age of 74. The Tonkin shadow ministry was the first of its kind in Western Australia.

Preceded by Brand–Nalder Ministry	Tonkin Ministry; 1971-1974	Succeeded by Court–McPharlin Ministry
