= Mervyn Forrest =

Australian politician (1891–1975)

Member of the Legislative Council of Western Australia
- In office 22 May 1946 – 21 May 1952
- Preceded by: Cyril Cornish
- Succeeded by: Don Barker
- Constituency: North Province

Personal details
- Born: 28 April 1891 Bunbury, Western Australia
- Died: 22 August 1975 (aged 84) Perth, Western Australia
- Party: Liberal

Robert Mervyn Forrest (28 April 1891 – 22 August 1975) was an Australian pastoralist and politician who served as a Liberal Party member of the Legislative Council of Western Australia from 1946 to 1952, representing North Province.

== Early life ==
Forrest was born in Bunbury, Western Australia, to Mary (née Parker) and David Forrest. His father and two uncles (Alexander and John) were also members of parliament, with John being Western Australia's first premier. Forrest lived at Minderoo Station for periods as a child, and was later sent to Perth to be educated, attending Hale School and Guildford Grammar School. After leaving school, he worked for family businesses as a jackaroo at Cubbine Station, bookkeeper in Perth, and station overseer of Minderoo. Forrest eventually became managing director of the holding company for the Minderoo and Wyloo leases, and also served on the executive of the Pastoralists and Graziers Association. He became a justice of the peace in 1916.

== Family ==
Forrest married Agnes Courthope (the granddaughter of Archdeacon James Brown) in 1918, with whom he had four children. A grandson, Andrew Forrest, became a prominent mining entrepreneur.

== Politics and later life ==
Forrest served on the Ashburton Road Board from 1915 to 1947, including as chairman from 1924. He entered parliament at the 1946 Legislative Council election, defeating Cyril Cornish (an independent) for one of the three North Province seats. Forrest served a single six-year term before losing his seat to Labor's Don Barker at the 1952 election. After allocation of preferences he was defeated by five votes (873 votes were cast).

Forrest died in Perth in August 1975, aged 84, and was buried at Karrakatta Cemetery.

== See also ==
- Members of the Western Australian Legislative Council
