= Donald McDonald Mackay =

Australian politician

The Honourable Donald McDonald MacKay
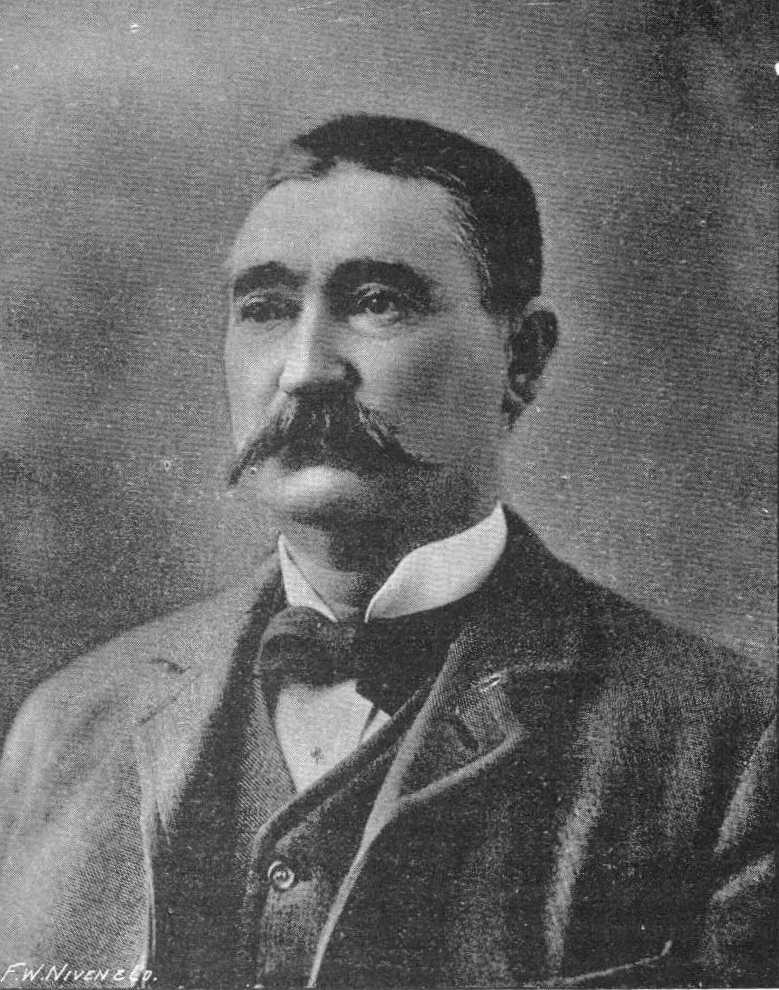

Member of the Legislative Council of Western Australia
- In office 27 July 1896 – 21 May 1902
- Preceded by: Edward Robinson
- Succeeded by: Sir Edward Wittenoom
- Constituency: North Province

Personal details
- Born: c. 1845 Isle of Skye, Scotland
- Died: 30 January 1904 Fremantle, Western Australia, Australia

Donald McDonald MacKay (c. 1845 – 30 January 1904) was an Australian pastoralist and politician who was a member of the Legislative Council of Western Australia from 1896 to 1902, representing North Province.

MacKay was born in Ben Mohr Estate, Snizort, Isle of Skye, Inverness-shire in 1847, a son of Samuel Nicholson Mackay and Janette Mackay (née McKinnon) (died 23 June 1891), who emigrated with their family to South Australia in 1855, settling in Naracoorte. MacKay left for Western Australia in 1869, and went to the Pilbara, where he developed a pastoral lease on the Maitland River. With his brother, Roderick MacKay, he later developed Mundabullangana Station on the Yule River. In 1892, after a drought, MacKay sold his property in the North-West and moved to Fremantle. He was elected to the Legislative Council for the North Province at the 1896 elections, replacing Edward Robinson, and served a single six-year term before retiring. MacKay died in Fremantle in January 1904.

== Family ==
MacKay married (Emily) Charlotte Vincent on 21 February 1893 at Scots Church, Fremantle, with whom he had three children.

The author Catherine Edith Macauley Martin was his youngest sister, and it may be noted that the subject of this article, Donald McDonald MacKay, had a brother (third son of Samuel) Donald Mackay (1832 – 24 December 1901), sheep grazier of Mundabullangana, Yule and Benmore stations.
