= National Alliance (Australia) =

Former Australian political party

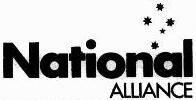
- Abbreviation: Alliance
- Founded: 1974; 51 years ago
- Dissolved: 1974; 51 years ago
- Political position: Centrist
- Member parties: WA Country Party; Democratic Labor Party

The National Alliance was an Australian electoral alliance. The alliance was formed in 1974 as a short-lived arrangement between the Western Australian branches of the Country Party and Democratic Labor Party (DLP), covering the 1974 Western Australian state election and 1974 federal election.

== History ==
Candidates stood on a centrist platform as the "National Alliance" in both the March 1974 state election and the May 1974 federal election. It contested most of the state seats and every federal seat, standing in many metropolitan seats for the first time. At the Western Australian state election, National Alliance won more than 8.5% of the primary vote. At the 1974 federal election it won 10.7% of the primary vote in WA, but lost the Country Party's last two seats in the House of Representatives and one of its Senate seats, winning only a single Senate seat for incumbent Tom Drake-Brockman. However, in both elections the party lost votes and seats compared to the combined performance of its component parties in previous elections.

== Aftermath ==
Following the 1974 state election, members of the parliamentary Country Party resolved that they would abandon the "National Alliance" branding. In June 1974, the state council of the Country Party resolved to "defer indefinitely" negotiations with the DLP towards a formal merger of the parties. The party's state president Jim Fletcher stated that the "supreme decision-makers are the voters and the fact that they did not support the alliance was sufficient evidence that it should be discontinued".

Country Party federal MP John Hallett, who lost his seat at the 1974 federal election, stated that "the formation of the National Alliance was the probably the biggest mistake in the history of the Country Party".

The Country Party rebranded itself as the National Country Party and Senator Drake-Brockman continued to sit as its member, leading the party in the Senate. It reverted to its traditional approach of only contesting rural seats. In the 1977 federal election, Drake-Brockman retired and his seat was lost. As at 2018, he is the last member of what is now the National Party to be elected to the Senate from Western Australia.
