= Edward Robinson (Australian politician) =

Politician in Australia

Edward Robinson (c. August 1839 – 31 January 1913) was a Member of the Western Australian Legislative Council from 1894 to 1896.

Born in Brampton, Suffolk, England, Robinson was the son of veterinarian William Robinson, and Margaret Maria née Ford, from Sunninghill, Berkshire, England. His father died on the ship 'Success' leaving his mother and five small children. At the age of four he emigrated to Western Australia with his family, arriving on board the Success in March 1843. He received no formal schooling, and worked as a shepherd in the Brookton area from a young age. In 1859 he was working as a labourer for John Seabrook, and in 1863 he accompanied Henry Maxwell Lefroy on an exploring expedition to the east of York. The following year he look up land at Pingelly, where he established a wheat and sheep farm in partnership with his stepbrother. He also took up 2000 acres (8 km^{2}) at Brookton, establishing the Sunning Hill farm. In 1874 he made a second exploring expedition, this time with William Lukin in search of pastoral land. He took up Croydon Station near Roebourne in 1875, and later also Langwell station. On 15 March 1877 he married a widow named Beverley Sophia Pennel Baddock (née Wells); they would have no children. In 1885 he sold his entire estate and bought a farm near Bellevue.

On 16 July 1894, Edward Robinson was elected to a North Province seat in the Western Australian Legislative Council. He held the seat until the election of 27 July 1896, when he was defeated by Donald McDonald MacKay. He was a member of the Greenmount Road Board from 1904 until his death. He died at Bellevue (near Midland) on 31 January 1913, and was buried in Middle Swan Cemetery.
