= Eric Heenan =

Former Justice of the Supreme Court of Western Australia

Eric Michael Heenan KC
- Born: 24 June 1945; Kalgoorlie, Western Australia
- Education: Aquinas College, Perth
- Occupation: Judge

Eric Michael Heenan KC is a former justice of the Supreme Court of Western Australia, the highest ranking court in the Australian state of Western Australia.

== Education ==
He was educated at Aquinas College (class of 1962), and the University of Western Australia from which he graduated in 1966. He left his father's firm E.M. Heenan & Co in 1983 to practise as a barrister. He was appointed King's Counsel in 1985.

== Career ==
Heenan served as president of the WA Bar Association from 1990 to 1992, and as vice-president of the Australian bar association in 1992. He also served as a Commissioner of the Western Australian Supreme Court in 1990 and 1994.

From 1988 to 1994, Heenan served as the deputy chairman of the Aquinas College Board.

Heenan was appointed to the Supreme Court on 4 April 2002. He retired in 2015.
