= Minister for Local Government (Western Australia) =

The Minister for Local Government is a position in the Cabinet of Western Australia, first created in 1949 during the McLarty–Watts Ministry. The minister, who may also hold other portfolios, is responsible for the relationships between the state government and the local government areas of Western Australia, often facilitated through the WA Local Government Association (WALGA). The current Minister for Local Government is Hannah Beazley of WA Labor, who was appointed to Cabinet under a reshuffle following the appointment of Roger Cook as Premier of Western Australia.

== List of ministers for local government ==
22 people have been appointed as Minister for Local Government in Western Australia, with Leslie Logan's 11 years and 335 days the longest time period in the position. From the early 1950s through to the 1980s, the Minister for Local Government was generally also the Minister for Town Planning, although the portfolios were always created separately. In the table below, members of the Legislative Council are designated "MLC". All others were members of the Legislative Assembly at the time of their service. In Western Australia, serving ministers are entitled to be styled "The Honourable", and may retain the style after three years' service in the ministry.

Order	Minister	Party	Premier	Term start	Term end
1	David Brand	Liberal	McLarty	7 October 1949	6 April 1950
2	Victor Doney	Country	McLarty	6 April 1950	23 February 1953
3	Gilbert Fraser	Labor	Hawke	23 February 1953	1 November 1958
4	Frank Wise MLC	Labor	Hawke	1 November 1958	2 April 1959
5	Leslie Logan MLC	Country	Brand	2 April 1959	3 March 1971
6	Claude Stubbs MLC	Labor	Tonkin	3 March 1971	8 April 1974
7	Cyril Rushton	Liberal	C. Court	8 April 1974	25 August 1978
8	June Craig	Liberal	C. Court	25 August 1978	25 January 1982
8	June Craig	Liberal	O'Connor	25 January 1982	25 February 1983
9	Jeff Carr	Labor	Burke	25 February 1983	25 February 1988
9	Jeff Carr	Labor	Dowding	25 February 1988	28 February 1989
10	Kay Hallahan MLC	Labor	Dowding	28 February 1989	12 February 1990
11	Gordon Hill	Labor	Lawrence	12 February 1990	5 February 1991
12	David Smith	Labor	Lawrence	5 February 1991	16 February 1993
13	Paul Omodei	Liberal	R. Court	16 February 1993	16 February 2001
14	Michelle Roberts	Labor	Gallop	16 February 2001	1 July 2001
15	Tom Stephens MLC	Labor	Gallop	1 July 2001	16 September 2004
16	Ljiljanna Ravlich	Labor	Gallop	21 September 2004	10 March 2005
17	John Bowler	Labor	Gallop	10 March 2005	25 January 2006
17	John Bowler	Labor	Carpenter	25 January 2006	3 February 2006
18	Jon Ford MLC	Labor	Carpenter	3 February 2006	13 December 2006
– (17)	John Bowler	Labor	Carpenter	13 December 2006	2 March 2007
– (16)	Ljiljanna Ravlich MLC	Labor	Carpenter	2 March 2007	23 September 2008
19	John Castrilli	Liberal	Barnett	23 September 2008	21 March 2013
20	Tony Simpson	Liberal	Barnett	21 March 2013	20 September 2016
21	Paul Miles	Liberal	Barnett	22 September 2016	17 March 2017
22	David Templeman	Labor	McGowan	17 March 2017	19 March 2021
23	John Carey	Labor	McGowan	19 March 2021	8 June 2023
24	David Michael	Labor	Cook	8 June 2023	8 December 2023
25	Hannah Beazley	Labor	Cook	8 December 2023	
