= George Berry (Australian politician) =

Australian politician

The Honourable George Berry

Member of the Legislative Council of Western Australia
- In office 22 May 1968 – 21 May 1980
- Preceded by: Eric Heenan
- Succeeded by: Phil Lockyer
- Constituency: South Province

Personal details
- Born: 18 May 1913 Maylands, Western Australia, Australia
- Died: 4 April 1998 (aged 84) Carnarvon, Western Australia, Australia
- Party: Liberal

George William Berry (18 May 1913 – 4 April 1998) was an Australian politician who was a Liberal Party member of the Legislative Council of Western Australia from 1968 to 1980, representing Lower North Province.

Berry was born in Perth to Annie Adelaide (née Holding) and George Berry. He attended the Fremantle Boys' School, but left at the age of 13. Berry enlisted in the Royal Australian Air Force (RAAF) in 1941, and during the war served as a flight sergeant. After the war, he worked in Spearwood as a master butcher, and served on the Fremantle Road Board from 1946 to 1952. Berry moved to Carnarvon in 1954, where he farmed bananas. He served as secretary and treasurer of the local Liberal Party branch, and entered parliament at the 1968 state election, winning his seat from Labor's Eric Heenan. Berry was re-elected at the 1974 election, but retired at the 1980 election. He died in Carnarvon in April 1998, aged 84. He had married Dorothy Isabel Straughair in 1943, with whom he had three children. A son-in-law, Ian Laurance, was also a member of parliament.
