= John Tozer =

Australian politician (1922–1990)

Member of the Legislative Council of Western Australia
- In office 22 May 1974 – 21 May 1980
- Preceded by: John Hunt
- Succeeded by: None (reconstituted)
- Constituency: North Province

Personal details
- Born: 23 June 1922 Perth, Western Australia
- Died: 23 April 1990 (aged 67) Cottesloe, Western Australia
- Party: Liberal

John Carmichael Tozer (23 June 1922 – 23 April 1990) was an Australian public servant and politician who served as a Liberal Party member of the Legislative Council of Western Australia from 1974 to 1980, representing North Province.

Tozer was born in Perth to Evaline (née Carmichael) and Hubert John Harris Tozer. He attended Hale School and Perth Technical College, and in 1940 was accepted as an engineering cadet with Western Australian Government Railways. He enlisted in the Australian Army later in the year, however, and during the war served for periods with the Royal Australian Engineers, the 2/6th Commando Squadron, and the Parachute Training Centre. Tozer studied surveying after being discharged in 1946. He worked on Ocean Island from 1947 to 1952, as an employee of the British Phosphate Commission.

After a period working as a local government engineer, Tozer moved into administration. He held several senior public service positions in the North-West, including as assistant administrator at Derby from 1964 to 1967 and administrator at Port Hedland from 1970 to 1972. He was then a Department of Development and Decentralisation officer from 1972 to 1974. Tozer entered parliament at the 1974 state election, defeating John Hunt of the Labor Party. He served a single six-year term before being defeated by Peter Dowding at the 1980 election.

== Death ==
Tozer retired to Perth, dying there in April 1990 (aged 67).
