= Robert Boylen =

Australian politician (1901–1955)

- Born: 16 November 1901; Kensington, England
- Died: 25 June 1955 (aged 53)
- Burial place: Boulder Cemetery, Kalgoorlie

Robert Joseph Boylen (16 November 1901 – 25 June 1955) was an Australian politician. He was an Australian Labor Party member of the Western Australian Legislative Council from 1947 until his death, representing South Province (1947–1950) and South-East Province (1950–1955).

Boylen was born in the London suburb of Kensington, but his family migrated to Western Australia in 1903 and he was raised in Kalgoorlie–Boulder. He was educated at Christian Brothers College, Kalgoorlie and passed his final pharmacy examinations in 1926. He then practised in Perth for several years at Boans' Pharmacy and then at the Royal Perth Hospital before returning to Boulder in 1934 and opening his own pharmacy in Burt Street, which he would operate for the rest of his life. He was appointed a justice of the peace for the East Coolgardie district in 1938 and was a councillor for the Municipality of Boulder from 1944 until his death; he was also a member of the Eastern Goldfields Transport Board and a committee member of the Boulder Racing Club.

Boylen was elected to the Legislative Council at a by-election on 1 February 1947 following the death of Liberal MLC James Cornell. He won easily with a majority of the overall vote and nearly double the vote of his Liberal opponent, marking the first time Labor had ever held all three South Province seats. An anti-communist, he claimed in 1949 that the Communist Party of Australia were "the tools of a foreign organisation" and that "their leaders had proved their disloyalty to this country" while blocking their access to Boulder council facilities. Following a major electoral redistribution, he was easily re-elected for a full-term for South-East Province in 1950, with a more than two-to-one margin over his Liberal opponent. In 1953, Labor won government under Albert Hawke, and Boylen was appointed Government Whip in the Legislative Council. He died suddenly in office in June 1955 and was buried at the Boulder Cemetery, South Boulder, Kalgoorlie.

He married Elsie Kathleen Starr on 28 April 1928; they had four sons and one daughter.
