= Ewart Runciman =

Australian politician (1907–1981)

Member of the Legislative Assembly of Western Australia
- In office 23 June 1962 – 30 March 1974
- Preceded by: Sir Ross McLarty
- Succeeded by: Richard Shalders
- Constituency: Murray

Personal details
- Born: 15 July 1907 Edinburgh, Scotland
- Died: 14 December 1981 (aged 74) Pinjarra, Western Australia
- Party: Liberal

Ewart Henry Runciman (15 July 1907 – 14 December 1981) was an Australian farmer and politician who was a Liberal Party member of the Legislative Assembly of Western Australia from 1962 to 1974, representing the seat of Murray.

Runciman was born in Edinburgh, Scotland, to Agnes Evelyn (née Williamson) and Robert Thomas Ewart Runciman. His family moved to Albany, Western Australia, in 1912, but returned to Scotland in 1915 before going back to Australia in 1919. Runciman attended Scotch College, Perth, and subsequently won a scholarship to the Royal Military College, Duntroon, although he did not pursue a military career. Before entering politics, he was a farmer, spending periods at Wilga (1927 to 1948), Boyup Brook (1948 to 1952), and North Dandalup (from 1952).

Runciman entered parliament at the 1962 Murray by-election, which was caused by the resignation of Sir Ross McLarty (a former premier). He was re-elected three more times (in 1965, 1968 and 1971) before leaving parliament at the 1974 election. Runciman died in Pinjarra in December 1981, aged 74. He had married Flora Hester Mayhew (née Inglis) in 1942, with whom he had two daughters.

Parliament of Western Australia
Preceded by Sir Ross McLarty	Member for Murray; 1962–1974	Succeeded by Richard Shalders
