= John Hunt (Western Australian politician) =

Australian politician

Member of the Legislative Council of Western Australia
- In office 20 February 1971 – 21 May 1974
- Preceded by: Harry Strickland
- Succeeded by: John Tozer
- Constituency: North Province

Personal details
- Born: 22 November 1912 Kalgoorlie, Western Australia, Australia
- Died: 16 July 1988 (aged 75) Shenton Park, Western Australia, Australia
- Party: Labor

John Leslie Hunt (22 November 1912 – 16 July 1988) was an Australian politician who served as a Labor Party member of the Legislative Council of Western Australia from 1971 to 1974, representing North Province.

Hunt was born in Kalgoorlie to Ruby Maud (née Seddon) and Edwin Charles Hunt. He attended Eastern Goldfields High School and then farmed in Moorine Rock for several years. He later worked as a miner in Kalgoorlie and Marvel Loch. Hunt enlisted in the Australian Imperial Force in 1942, and during the war serving in New Guinea and Borneo with the 2/6th Commando Squadron. He was discharged in 1946, and in 1953 moved to the Pilbara, initially working at Wittenoom for ABA. He was later employed by the Mines Department, as a workmen's inspector based out of Port Hedland.

From 1964 to 1971, Hunt served on the Port Hedland Shire Council, including as shire president for several years. He was elected to parliament at a February 1971 by-election, caused by the resignation of Harry Strickland. At the 1974 state election, Hunt was narrowly defeated by John Tozer of the Liberal Party. He eventually retired to Perth, dying in Shenton Park in July 1988, aged 75. Hunt had married Dorothy Ellen Barger in 1933, with whom he had two children.
