= Edward House (Australian politician) =

Australian politician

Edward Charles House (29 September 1916 – 1 January 1971) was an Australian politician. He was a Country Party member of the Western Australian Legislative Council from 1965 until his death, representing South Province.

== Biography ==
House was born in Katanning and educated at Guildford Grammar School. He worked on his family's farm, "Eugenup" at Gnowangerup until 1940. On 7 October 1940, House enlisted for service with the Royal Australian Air Force in World War II, serving as a fighter pilot in the Middle East, North Africa and the Mediterranean with the No. 450 Squadron RAAF and on secondment with the No. 238 Squadron RAF. He was discharged on 14 September 1945, having been awarded the Distinguished Flying Medal, Distinguished Flying Cross and the Africa Star. House subsequently returned to farming at Gnowangerup and assumed the day-to-day management from his father in 1945, inheriting the property upon his father's death in 1954. He was a Shire of Gnowangerup councillor from 1962 to 1966 and a member of the executive of the Great Southern Regional Council Association.

House was elected to the Legislative Council at the 1965 state election. He was a member of the Printing Committee from 1965 to 1971. He died in office on 1 January 1971 at Hollywood Private Hospital in Perth and was buried at Karrakatta Cemetery.

== Personal life ==
House married RAAF Nursing Sister Catherine Joan Callaghan on 31 August 1945. They had one son and two three daughters; his son, Monty House, went on to become a long-serving member of the Western Australian Legislative Assembly.
