= Don Barker (politician) =

Australian politician

The Honourable Don Barker

Member of the Legislative Council of Western Australia
- In office 22 May 1951 – 18 July 1956
- Preceded by: Mervyn Forrest
- Succeeded by: Frank Wise
- Constituency: North Province

Personal details
- Born: 14 August 1904 York, Yorkshire, England
- Died: 18 July 1956 (aged 51) near Broome, Western Australia
- Party: Labor

Charles William Donald Barker (14 August 1904 – 18 July 1956) was an Australian politician who was a Labor Party member of the Legislative Council of Western Australia from 1952 until his death, representing North Province.

== Biography ==
Barker was born in York, England, and came to Western Australia at the age of 17, working as a station hand in the North-West. He served with the Royal Australian Navy during World War II. On his return to Australia, he ran a café in Broome for a period, and then worked in Derby as a stock inspector. Barker entered parliament at the 1952 Legislative Council elections, defeating the sitting Liberal member, Mervyn Forrest, by just five votes. He died in office in July 1956, aged 51. In parliament, he was known for his concern for Aboriginal welfare, and he and his wife (who had no children of their own) often put up visiting Aboriginal students from the North-West at their home in Perth.
