= Fred White (politician) =

Australian politician

The Honourable Fred White

Member of the Legislative Council of Western Australia
- In office 21 October 1967 – 20 October 1973
- Preceded by: Ray Jones
- Succeeded by: Gordon Masters
- Constituency: West Province

Personal details
- Born: 6 February 1927 Subiaco, Western Australia
- Died: 20 October 1973 (aged 46) Millendon, Western Australia
- Party: Country
- Education: University of Western Australia

Frederick Richard "Fred" White (6 February 1927 – 20 October 1973) was an Australian politician who served as a Country Party member of the Legislative Council of Western Australia from 1967 until his death.

White was born in Perth but was raised in the country, attending Northam Senior High School. He enlisted in the Royal Australian Air Force (RAAF) in February 1945, just after his 18th birthday, and served until the war ended later in the year. White worked as a tradesman for a period after the war, and then studied teaching at the University of Western Australia and Claremont Teachers College. Beginning in 1959, he worked as a science teacher at various high schools in the Perth metropolitan area. He was elected to the Kalamunda Shire Council in 1963, while still working as a teacher, and served as shire president from 1965 to 1968. White entered parliament at a 1967 Legislative Council by-election, necessitated by the death of Ray Jones, and was re-elected at the 1968 state election. However, his time in parliament was cut short by his sudden death in October 1973, at the age of 46. White had married Joyce Mary Bridges in 1953, with whom he had three children.
