= George Jeffery (politician) =

Australian politician

Member of the Legislative Council of Western Australia
- In office 22 May 1956 – 21 May 1962
- Preceded by: Frank Gibson
- Succeeded by: Herbert Robinson
- Constituency: Suburban Province

Personal details
- Born: 5 September 1920 Tumby Bay, South Australia, Australia
- Died: 24 July 1989 (aged 68) Kelmscott, Western Australia, Australia
- Party: Labor

George Edward Jeffery (5 September 1920 – 24 July 1989) was an Australian politician who served as a Labor Party member of the Legislative Council of Western Australia from 1956 to 1962, representing Suburban Province.

Jeffery was born in Tumby Bay, South Australia, to Mary Dora (née Fyfe) and Charles Victor Jeffery. His parents moved to Perth, Western Australia, when he was six, and he attended Perth Boys High School and Perth Technical School. Jeffery initially entered the police force, but later trained as a chemical plumber. He joined the Australian Army in 1941, and during the war served as a sapper with the Royal Australian Engineers. Jeffery returned to plumbing after leaving the military, and served on the executive of the Plumbers' Union. He was elected to parliament at the 1956 Legislative Council election, but served only a single six-year term before being defeated by Herbert Robinson at the 1962 election. After leaving politics, Jeffery worked for periods as a legal officer, company representative (with Burns Philp), and part-time local magistrate, and also became a life member of the Swan Districts Football Club. He died in Kelmscott in 1989, aged 68.
