= Jack Heitman =

Australian farmer and politician (1906-1977)

Member of the Legislative Council of Western Australia
- In office 17 August 1963 – 21 May 1965
- Preceded by: Charles Simpson
- Succeeded by: None (abolished)
- Constituency: Midland Province
- In office 22 May 1965 – 25 April 1977
- Preceded by: None (new seat)
- Succeeded by: Tom McNeil
- Constituency: Upper West Province

Personal details
- Born: 1 August 1906 Boulder, Western Australia, Australia
- Died: 25 April 1977 (aged 70) Mount Lawley, Western Australia, Australia
- Party: Liberal

Jack Heitman (1 August 1906 – 25 April 1977) was an Australian farmer and politician who was a member of the Legislative Council of Western Australia from 1963 until his death, representing the Liberal Party.

Heitman was born in Boulder, Western Australia, to Lillian Caroline (née Pascoe) and Herman Albert Heitman. He worked as a farm labourer in Morawa after leaving school, and eventually bought his own property there, where he established a sheep stud. He also owned a farm in Meekatharra. Heitman served on the Morawa Road Board from 1939 to 1940 and again from 1945 to 1961, including as chairman from 1950 to 1952. He entered parliament at a 1963 Legislative Council by-election for Midland Province, caused by the death of Charles Simpson. Heitman transferred to Upper West Province at the 1965 state election, and was re-elected in 1971. He did not contest the 1977 election, but died in office a month before his term ended. Heitman had married Adela Elizabeth Yewers in 1934, with whom he had four children.
