= Hugh Roche =

Australian politician

The Honourable Hugh Roche

Member of the Legislative Council of Western Australia
- In office 22 May 1940 – 21 May 1950
- Preceded by: Charles Wittenoom
- Succeeded by: None (seat reconstituted)
- Constituency: South-East Province
- In office 22 May 1950 – 21 May 1960
- Preceded by: None (seat reconstituted)
- Succeeded by: Sydney Thompson
- Constituency: South Province

Personal details
- Born: 5 November 1893 York, Western Australia, Australia
- Died: 15 July 1962 (aged 68) Bicton, Western Australia, Australia
- Party: Country

Hugh Lewis Roche (5 November 1893 – 15 July 1962) was an Australian politician who served as a Country Party member of the Legislative Council of Western Australia from 1940 to 1960.

Roche was born in York, Western Australia, to Maria Josephine (née Lockyer) and Hugh Henry Roche. He completed his early schooling in York before boarding at Christian Brothers' College, Perth. Roche enlisted in the Australian Imperial Force in January 1915, and during the war served with the 10th Light Horse, reaching the rank of warrant officer by the war's end. He was discharged in February 1920, and worked in Perth as a clerk for a period before going to farm in Kojonup. He served on the Kojonup Road Board from 1926 to 1940. Roche entered parliament at the 1940 Legislative Council elections, replacing Charles Wittenoom in South-East Province. He was re-elected in 1948, appointed to South Province in 1950 after a reconstitution, and then re-elected again in 1954. Roche left parliament in 1960 and died in Perth in July 1962, aged 68. He had married Mariane Florence Reid in 1944, but had no children.
