= Charles Abbey =

Farmer and politician of Western Australia

Member of the Legislative Council of Western Australia
- In office 22 May 1958 – 21 May 1965
- Preceded by: Norm Baxter
- Succeeded by: None (reconstituted)
- Constituency: Central Province
- In office 22 May 1965 – 21 May 1977
- Preceded by: None (new seat)
- Succeeded by: Neil Oliver
- Constituency: West Province

Personal details
- Born: 24 November 1913 Fremantle, Western Australia, Australia
- Died: 2 September 1982 (aged 68) Mandurah, Western Australia, Australia
- Party: Liberal

Charles Roy Abbey (24 November 1913 – 2 September 1982) was an Australian farmer and politician who served as a Liberal Party member of the Legislative Council of Western Australia from 1958 to 1977.

Abbey was born in Fremantle to Clara Gertrude (née Berry) and Charles Thomas Abbey. His parents moved to Beverley (a Wheatbelt farming community) when he was a small child. Abbey worked as a shop assistant after leaving school and then turned to farming, leasing a property near the Dale River for five years before purchasing it outright. He was prominent in local agricultural circles and also served on the Beverley Road Board from 1953 to 1962. Abbey entered parliament at the 1958 Legislative Council election, defeating Norm Baxter of the Country Party in Central Province. After a redistribution, he transferred to West Province at the 1965 state election, which he held until his retirement in 1977. Abbey retired to Mandurah, dying there in September 1982 (aged 68). He had married Winifred Doreen Strange in 1941, with whom he had one daughter.
