= J. M. A. Cunningham =

Australian politician

The Honourable John Cunningham

Member of the Legislative Council of Western Australia
- In office 22 May 1948 – 21 May 1950
- Preceded by: Charles Williams
- Succeeded by: None (seat reconstituted)
- Constituency: South Province
- In office 22 May 1950 – 21 May 1954
- Preceded by: None (seat reconstituted)
- Succeeded by: Jim Garrigan
- Constituency: South-East Province
- In office 10 September 1955 – 21 May 1965
- Preceded by: Robert Boylen
- Succeeded by: Claude Stubbs
- Constituency: South-East Province

Personal details
- Born: 25 April 1912 Boulder, Western Australia, Australia
- Died: 29 July 1996 (aged 84) Bentley, Western Australia, Australia
- Party: Liberal

John Michael Adrenne Cunningham (25 April 1912 – 29 July 1996) was an Australian politician who was a Liberal Party member of the Legislative Council of Western Australia from 1948 to 1954 and again from 1955 to 1962. He also served as mayor of Boulder from 1954 to 1955.

== Early life ==
Cunningham was born in Boulder, Western Australia, to Alice Frances (née Oaklands) and John Edmond Cunningham. His father died when he was eight, and he moved to Perth to live with his grandmother. After leaving school, Cunningham worked a number of odd jobs, spending periods as a printer's devil, delivery boy, prospector, and miner (at Meekatharra). He eventually became a certified boiler attendant and engine driver, and worked on the railway at Mount Isa, Queensland. Cunningham enlisted in the Royal Australian Air Force (RAAF) in September 1942, and served in the South-West Pacific theatre (including in New Guinea) as a radar operator and hygiene officer.

== Politics ==
Cunningham returned to Boulder after his military service, and in 1947 was elected to the Boulder Municipal Council. He served on the council until 1955, including as mayor from 1954 to 1955. Cunningham entered parliament at the 1948 Legislative Council elections, standing in South Province. After a reconstitution, he was appointed to South-East Province in 1950, but was defeated by Labor's Jim Garrigan in 1954. Cunningham re-entered the Legislative Council just over a year later, at a by-election following the death of Robert Boylen. He was re-elected in 1956, but in 1962 lost his seat to Labor's Claude Stubbs. He made an unsuccessful attempt to reclaim his seat at the 1965 state election.

== Later life ==
After leaving parliament, Cunningham bought a news agency in Boulder. He sold that in 1965, and then worked for periods for Western Mining and Hendry, Rae and Court (an accounting firm). Cunningham died in Perth in July 1996, aged 84. He had married Elva May Alcock in 1939, with whom he had two children, but was widowed in 1987.
