= Claude Stubbs =

Australian politician

The Honourable Claude Stubbs

Member of the Legislative Council of Western Australia
- In office 22 May 1962 – 21 May 1980
- Preceded by: John Cunningham
- Succeeded by: Jim Brown
- Constituency: South-East Province

Minister for Local Government
- In office 3 March 1971 – 8 April 1974
- Premier: John Tonkin
- Preceded by: Les Logan
- Succeeded by: Cyril Rushton

Personal details
- Born: Robert Henry Clause Stubbs; 2 April 1905 Northam, Western Australia, Australia
- Died: 25 May 1998 (aged 93) Wembley, Western Australia, Australia
- Party: Labor
- Spouse: Violet Gammage (m. 1931)
- Children: 3

Robert Henry Claude Stubbs (2 April 1905 – 25 May 1998) was an Australian politician who was a Labor Party member of the Legislative Council of Western Australia from 1962 to 1980, representing South-East Province. He served as a minister in the government of John Tonkin.

Stubbs was born in Northam, Western Australia, to Mary Jane (née Marshall) and Stokes Stubbs. He attended the Kalgoorlie School of Mines and Perth Technical College, and then worked as a miner in Collie. Stubbs moved to Kalgoorlie in 1932, and then to Norseman in 1937, where he eventually became an underground supervisor. He later worked as a health inspector for the Shire of Dundas. Stubbs entered parliament at the 1962 Legislative Council elections, defeating John Cunningham (the sitting Liberal Party member). He was made a Labor Party whip in 1965, and after the Labor victory at the 1971 state election was made Chief Secretary and Minister for Local Government in the new ministry formed by John Tonkin. Stubbs remained in the ministry until the Labor government was defeated at the 1974 election, and left parliament at the 1980 election. He died in Perth in May 1998, aged 93. Stubbs had married Violet Gammage in 1931, with whom he had three children.

Parliament of Western Australia
Political offices
Preceded by James Craig	Chief Secretary; 1971–1974	Succeeded by Matt Stephens
Preceded by Les Logan	Minister for Local Government; 1971–1974	Succeeded by Cyril Rushton
