= Sydney Thompson (politician) =

Australian politician

The Honourable Sydney Thompson

Member of the Legislative Council of Western Australia
- In office 22 May 1960 – 21 May 1965
- Preceded by: Hugh Roche
- Succeeded by: None (seat reconstituted)
- Constituency: South Province
- In office 22 May 1965 – 21 May 1974
- Preceded by: None (new seat)
- Succeeded by: Winifred Piesse
- Constituency: Lower Central Province

Personal details
- Born: 21 February 1906 Wagin, Western Australia, Australia
- Died: 1 August 1994 (aged 88) Narrogin, Western Australia, Australia
- Party: Country

Sydney Thomas Joseph Thompson (21 February 1906 – 1 August 1994) was an Australian politician who served as a Country Party member of the Legislative Council of Western Australia from 1960 to 1974.

Thompson was born in Wagin, Western Australia, to Annie Agnes (née Carpenter) and James William Thompson. He left school in 1921 and worked on his parents' farm until 1928, when he bought his own property. Thompson became prominent in local agricultural circles, serving as president of the Wagin Agricultural Society and the local branch of the farmers' union. He served on the Wagin Road Board from 1951 to 1961. Thompson entered parliament at the 1960 Legislative Council election, replacing Hugh Roche in South Province. Following a redistribution, he was appointed to the new Lower Central Province in 1965, and was re-elected at the 1968 state election. Thompson retired at the 1974 election and died in Narrogin in August 1994, aged 88. He had married Violet Mary Gell in 1931, with whom he had four children.
