= William Hall (Australian politician) =

Australian trade unionist and politician

Member of the Legislative Council of Western Australia
- In office 22 May 1938 – 1 May 1963
- Preceded by: Charles Elliott
- Succeeded by: David Dellar
- Constituency: North-East Province

Personal details
- Born: 3 May 1902 Boulder, Western Australia, Australia
- Died: 1 May 1963 (aged 60) Subiaco, Western Australia, Australia
- Party: Labor

William Reaper Hall (3 May 1902 – 1 May 1963) was an Australian trade unionist and politician who served as a Labor Party member of the Legislative Council of Western Australia from 1938 until his death, representing North-East Province.

Hall was born in Boulder, Western Australia. He attended state schools in Kalgoorlie and then began working as a miner. Hall later began working for the Kalgoorlie Tramways, and eventually became secretary of the Tramway Employees' Union. He was elected to the Kalgoorlie Road Board in 1933 and would serve until 1949, including as chairman from 1935.

Hall entered parliament in 1938, defeating Catherine Reid Elliott, MBE, widow of the previous incumbent, Charles Elliott. He was re-elected in 1944, 1950, 1956, and 1962, and in 1954 was made chairman of committees. Hall died in Perth two days before his 61st birthday in 1963. Hall married Dulcie Tangney in 1922; the couple had two daughters.
