= Charles Simpson (politician) =

Australian politician

The Honourable Charles Simpson

Member of the Legislative Council of Western Australia
- In office 22 May 1946 – 21 May 1950
- Preceded by: Thomas Moore
- Succeeded by: None (seat reconstituted)
- Constituency: Central Province
- In office 22 May 1950 – 12 June 1963
- Preceded by: None (new seat)
- Succeeded by: Jack Heitman
- Constituency: Midland Province

Personal details
- Born: 28 August 1887 near Yanac, Victoria, Australia
- Died: 12 June 1963 (aged 75) Morawa, Western Australia, Australia
- Party: Liberal (to 1958); Country (from 1958)

Charles Herbert Simpson (28 August 1887 – 12 June 1963) was an Australian politician who was a member of the Legislative Council of Western Australia from 1946 until his death. He served as a minister in the government of Ross McLarty.

Simpson was born near Yanac, Victoria, to Mary Ann (née Stone) and John Michael Simpson. He moved to Western Australia at a young age, and in 1905 went to the Murchison goldfields, living at Youanmi for a period. Simpson lived in Rhodesia from 1914 to 1916, and then enlisted in the British Army, serving in England with the Royal Engineers. He returned to Australia after the war's end, initially living in Paynesville and later working as a storekeeper and land agent in Pindar.

At the 1946 Legislative Council elections, Simpson won a seat in Central Province for the Liberal Party. He became a government whip in 1948, and after the 1950 state election was appointed Minister for Transport, Minister for Railways, and Minister for Mines. Simpson served in cabinet until the McLarty government's defeat at the 1953 state election. He was leader of the Liberal Party in the Legislative Council from 1955 until 1958, when he instead joined the Country Party. Simpson died in office in June 1963, aged 75. He had married Neta Annice Matyr in 1921, with whom he had two daughters.

Parliament of Western Australia
Political offices
Preceded by Hubert Parker	Minister for Mines; 1950–1953	Succeeded by Lionel Kelly
Preceded by Harrie Seward	Minister for Transport; 1950–1953	Succeeded by Herbert Styants
Preceded by Harrie Seward	Minister for Railways; 1950–1953	Succeeded by Herbert Styants
