= James Murray (Australian politician) =

Australian politician

The Honourable James Murray

Member of the Legislative Assembly of Western Australia
- In office 15 March 1947 – 25 March 1950
- Preceded by: Frederick Withers
- Succeeded by: Frank Guthrie
- Constituency: Bunbury

Member of the Legislative Council of Western Australia
- In office 2 June 1951 – 21 May 1965
- Preceded by: William Mann
- Succeeded by: Vic Ferry
- Constituency: South-West Province

Personal details
- Born: 9 April 1895 Inverness, Scotland
- Died: 19 January 1974 (aged 78) Nedlands, Western Australia, Australia
- Party: Liberal

James Murray (9 April 1895 – 19 January 1974) was an Australian politician who served in both houses of the Parliament of Western Australia, as a member of the Legislative Assembly from 1947 to 1950 and as a member of the Legislative Council from 1951 to 1965. He represented the Liberal Party.

Murray was born in Inverness, Scotland, and attended Inverness High School. He came to Australia as a teenager, and in March 1915 enlisted in the Australian Imperial Force. Murray had reached the rank of lieutenant by the war's end, and in June 1918 was wounded in action while fighting in France. After being discharged from the army, he worked at various timbermills in Western Australia's South West, including as a millhand, clerk, and foreman. Murray re-enlisted in the army in 1940, but was able to remain in Western Australia, working as a training officer and in logistics. He entered politics at the 1947 state election, winning the seat of Bunbury from the Labor Party. However, his time in the Legislative Assembly was short-lived, with Labor's Frank Guthrie reclaiming the seat for his party at the 1950 election. Murray re-entered parliament at a 1951 by-election for South-West Province, having worked as a sawmill manager in the meantime. The by-election had been caused by the death of the sitting member, William Mann. Murray remained in parliament until retiring at the 1965 state election. He died in Perth in January 1974, aged 78.

Parliament of Western Australia
Preceded by Frederick Withers	Member for Bunbury; 1947–1950	Succeeded by Frank Guthrie
