= Bill Willesee =

Australian politician

The Honourable Bill Willesee

Member of the Legislative Council of Western Australia
- In office 22 May 1954 – 21 May 1965
- Preceded by: Frank Welsh
- Succeeded by: None (seat abolished)
- Constituency: North Province
- In office 22 May 1965 – 21 May 1974
- Preceded by: None (new seat)
- Succeeded by: Don Cooley
- Constituency: North-East Metropolitan Province

Personal details
- Born: 26 December 1911 Adelaide, South Australia, Australia
- Died: 18 August 2000 (aged 88) Yokine, Western Australia, Australia
- Party: Labor

William Francis Willesee (26 December 1911 – 18 August 2000) was an Australian politician who served as a Labor Party member of the Legislative Council of Western Australia from 1954 to 1974. He was a minister in the government of John Tonkin.

== Early life ==
Willesee was born in Adelaide, South Australia, to Ethel May (née Flinders) and William Robert Willesee. His father ran for parliament unsuccessfully on three occasions in the 1920s, while his younger brother, Don Willesee, was a senator. Moving to Western Australia as a small child, Willesee attended various schools in the country, and later studied accounting at Perth Technical College. He was employed as a clerk by the Carnarvon Municipality from 1936 to 1942, and then joined the Volunteer Defence Corps, working as a pay clerk. After the war's end, Willesee worked for periods in a state government department and in a private transport firm, eventually returning to Carnarvon in 1951 to work again as town clerk. He was involved with both the Clerks' Union and the Australian Workers' Union.

== Politics and later life ==
At the 1954 Legislative Council election, Willesee won election to North Province, joining two other Labor MPs (Don Barker and Harry Strickland) in the three-member constituency. He was re-elected in 1960, but North Province was reduced to two members at the 1965 state election, and he consequently transferred to the new North-East Metropolitan Province. In July 1966, Willesee replaced Frank Wise as leader of the Labor Party in the Legislative Council. When Labor won the 1971 state election, he became Leader of the Government in the Legislative Council, and was also made Minister for Community Welfare (a new title) in the new ministry formed by John Tonkin. He held both positions until February 1973, when he resigned them due to ill health. Willesee left parliament at the 1974 state election. He died in Perth on August 18, 2000, aged 88.

== See also ==
- Tonkin Ministry

Parliament of Western Australia
Political offices
New creation	Minister for Community Welfare; 1971–1973	Succeeded by Ronald Thompson
