= John Teahan =

Australian politician

Member of the Legislative Council of Western Australia
- In office 22 May 1954 – 21 May 1965
- Preceded by: Sir Harold Seddon
- Succeeded by: None (seat abolished)
- Constituency: North-East Province

Personal details
- Born: 28 August 1900 Boulder, Western Australia, Australia
- Died: 21 October 1968 (aged 68) Boulder, Western Australia, Australia
- Party: Labor

John Denis Teahan (28 August 1900 – 21 October 1968) was an Australian politician who served as a Labor Party member of the Legislative Council of Western Australia from 1954 to 1965, representing North-East Province.

Teahan was born in Boulder, Western Australia, to Ellen (née Anglis) and Patrick Teahan. He attended Christian Brothers' College, Kalgoorlie, and then moved to Perth to work as a clerk with the Commonwealth Taxation Office. Teahan moved back to Kalgoorlie in 1932, setting up as a storekeeper and taxation consultant. He was elected to the Boulder Municipal Council in 1938, and in 1944 was elected mayor. Teahan contested Labor preselection for the 1948 Boulder by-election, but was defeated by Charlie Oliver. He entered parliament at the 1954 Legislative Council election, defeating Sir Harold Seddon of the Liberal Party (the serving President of the Legislative Council). Teahan was re-elected in 1960, but retired at the 1965 state election. He died in Boulder in October 1968, aged 68.
