= Jim Garrigan =

Australian trade unionist and politician

The Honourable Jim Garrigan

Member of the Legislative Assembly of Western Australia
- In office 22 May 1954 – 5 April 1971
- Preceded by: John Cunningham
- Succeeded by: Ron Leeson
- Constituency: South-East Province

Personal details
- Born: 26 May 1905 West Perth, Western Australia, Australia
- Died: 5 April 1971 (aged 65) Adelaide, South Australia, Australia
- Party: Labor

James Joseph Garrigan (26 May 1905 – 5 April 1971) was an Australian trade unionist and politician who served as a Labor Party member of the Legislative Council of Western Australia from 1954 until his death, representing South-East Province.

Garrigan was born in Perth to Mary Henrietta (née Anderson) and Timothy Garrigan. After leaving school, he lived in New South Wales for a period, working variously as a farmer, horse breaker, shearer, and station overseer. Garrigan moved to Kalgoorlie-Boulder in 1929 to work on the mines, and eventually became an underground supervisor. He served on the executive and management committee of the Australian Workers' Union's mining division.

From 1946 to 1950, Garrigan served on the Boulder Municipal Council. He was elected to parliament at the 1954 Legislative Council election, defeating John Cunningham of the Liberal Party. Garrigan was re-elected in 1960 and in 1965, but did not contest the 1971 election. He died in office just over a month before his final term would have ended. He had married Gweneth Huxtable in 1935, with whom he had one son.
