= Evan Davies (Western Australian politician) =

Australian trade unionist and politician

The Honourable Evan Davies

Member of the Legislative Council of Western Australia
- In office 21 June 1947 – 10 April 1963
- Preceded by: William Kitson
- Succeeded by: Jerry Dolan
- Constituency: West Province

Personal details
- Born: 22 June 1892 Melbourne, Victoria, Australia
- Died: 10 April 1963 (aged 70) Fremantle, Western Australia, Australia
- Party: Labor

Evan Morris Davies (22 June 1892 – 10 April 1963) was an Australian trade unionist and politician who was a Labor Party member of the Legislative Council of Western Australia from 1947 until his death, representing West Province.

Davies was born in Melbourne to Ann Elmira (née Davis) and John Morris Davies. He moved to Western Australia as a small child, and after leaving school began working for Western Australian Government Railways. Davies enlisted in the Australian Army in August 1917, and served in France with the 16th Battalion. He was discharged in September 1919, and subsequently returned to the railways. Davies became president of the Fremantle branch of the Locomotive Drivers, Firemen and Cleaners' Union, and in 1928 was elected to the Fremantle City Council, where he would serve for the rest of his life (including as deputy mayor for a period). He entered parliament at a 1947 Legislative Council by-election, caused by the resignation of William Kitson. Davies was re-elected in 1950, 1956, and 1962, but died in office in April 1963. He had married Gertrude May Potter in 1915, with whom he had two children.

== See also ==
- Evan Davies Building
