= Frederick Lavery =

Australian trade unionist and politician

The Honourable Frederick Lavery

Member of the Legislative Council of Western Australia
- In office 22 May 1952 – 21 May 1965
- Preceded by: Edmund Gray
- Succeeded by: None (seat reconstituted)
- Constituency: West Province
- In office 22 May 1965 – 12 January 1971
- Preceded by: None (new seat)
- Succeeded by: Des Dans
- Constituency: South Metropolitan Province

Personal details
- Born: 13 February 1898 Coolgardie, Western Australia, Australia
- Died: 12 January 1971 (aged 72) Subiaco, Western Australia, Australia
- Party: Labor

Frederick Richard Hugh Lavery (13 February 1898 – 12 January 1971) was an Australian trade unionist and politician who was a Labor Party member of the Legislative Council of Western Australia from 1952 to 1971.

Lavery was born in Coolgardie, Western Australia, to Mary (née de Landgrafft) and William Lavery. He began his schooling in Southern Cross, but later moved away from the country and attended Fremantle Boys' School. After leaving school, Lavery worked for periods as a contractor (at Ballidu), bus driver, and truck driver (for Commonwealth Oil Refineries). He joined the Road Transport Union in 1920, and served as treasurer for 14 years and on the executive for 24 years, and eventually becoming a life member. Lavery entered parliament at the 1952 Legislative Council election, replacing the retiring Edmund Gray in West Province. He was re-elected in 1958, and at the 1965 state election transferred to the new South Metropolitan Province, following a redistribution. Lavery died in office in January 1971, at St John of God Subiaco Hospital. He had been married twice, firstly to Nora Newbold in 1925, with whom he had two sons. He was widowed in 1958, and remarried in 1966 to Ruby Hutchison, who was also a member of the Legislative Council. They were the first married couple to serve together in an Australian parliament.
