= Reg Mattiske =

Australian politician

Reginald Clair Mattiske (22 June 1912 - 6 May 1992) was an Australian politician. He was a Liberal Party of Australia member of the Western Australian Legislative Council from 1956 to 1965, representing Metropolitan Province.

Mattiske was born in the regional town of York, and was educated at York State School, Northam High School and Perth Modern School and the University of Western Australia, where he received a diploma of commerce. He was a junior clerk in the state Premier's Department from 1928 to 1934 and then a clerk from 1934 to 1940; by 1940 he was the accountant for the State Gardens Board and the Perth Zoo.

He was promoted to inspecting accountant in the Treasury Department on 19 March 1940, but enlisted for service in World War II with the Perth-based 5th Anti-Aircraft Battery on 30 January 1942. He was stationed at the 418 Gun Station, then the School of Artillery and then the Perth Anti-Aircraft Headquarters, and was promoted to sergeant in May 1942 and acting lieutenant in October 1942. He was placed on the military's retired list on 24 April 1945 and resigned from the state public service on 15 June 1945.

Mattiske was involved in establishing the Building Industry Congress of Western Australia in 1945 and became its organising director. He then worked as a public accountant in private practice from 1946 to 1974, while continuing in his role at the BIC for several years. He served as a member of the Perth Road Board from 1953 to 1957, the Registrar of the Hairdressers' Registration Board and the secretary of the West Australian Amateur Football Association. He also became a life member of the South Perth Cricket Club in 1947, and was appointed a justice of the peace in 1954.

Mattiske was elected to the Legislative Council at a by-election for Metropolitan Province on 9 June 1956. He was touted as a possible nominee for a Senate vacancy in 1964, but this did not occur. He left the Legislative Council in 1965.

After leaving politics, Mattiske continued his accountancy practice, was state president of the RSPCA from 1961 to 1979, was a director of the Perth Building Society from 1966 until 1983 and was the honorary consul of Finland in Perth from 1972. Mattiske died at Sir Charles Gairdner Hospital in 1992 and was buried at Karrakatta Cemetery.

He married Kathleen Eva Gratwick on 17 August 1937; they had one daughter.
