= Ron Thompson (Australian politician) =

Australian trade unionist and politician

The Honourable Ron Thompson

Member of the Legislative Council of Western Australia
- In office 7 February 1959 – 21 May 1965
- Preceded by: Gilbert Fraser
- Succeeded by: None (seat reconstituted)
- Constituency: West Province
- In office 22 May 1965 – 21 May 1980
- Preceded by: None (new seat)
- Succeeded by: Howard Olney
- Constituency: South Metropolitan Province

Personal details
- Born: 15 November 1917 Northam, Western Australia, Australia
- Died: 18 May 2006 (aged 88) Wembley, Western Australia, Australia
- Party: Labor (to 1977)
- Other political affiliations: Independent (from 1977)

Ronald Thompson (15 November 1917 – 16 May 2006) was an Australian trade unionist and politician who was a member of the Legislative Council of Western Australia from 1959 to 1980. He served as a minister in the government of John Tonkin.

Thompson was born in Fremantle to Margaret Alice (née Mewburn) and Samuel Thompson. He left school at the age of 14, and subsequently worked as a wool classer at the Fremantle Woolstores. He was later employed as a shopkeeper and waterside worker, and held various positions in the local branch of the Waterside Workers' Federation (WWF). Thompson entered parliament at a 1959 Legislative Council by-election for West Province, caused by the death of Gilbert Fraser. He transferred to the new South Metropolitan Province at the 1965 state election. After Labor's victory at the 1971 election, Thompson was appointed government whip and deputy leader of the government in the Legislative Council.

In February 1973, when Bill Willesee resigned due to ill health, Thompson was elevated to the ministry, becoming Minister for Community Welfare and Minister for Police. A few months later, he also replaced Don Taylor as Minister for Tourism, holding all three portfolios until the government's defeat at the 1974 election. He then became a member of the Tonkin Shadow Ministry. In 1977, Thompson was expelled from the Labor Party after publicly opposing its policy on homosexuality. He sat as an independent until his term ended at the 1980 state election, and died in Perth in May 2006, aged 88. He had married Doris Violet Brams in 1943, with whom he had two children.

Parliament of Western Australia
Political offices
Preceded by Bill Willesee	Minister for Community Welfare; 1973–1974	Succeeded by Norm Baxter
Preceded by Jerry Dolan	Minister for Police; 1973–1974	Succeeded by Ray O'Connor
Preceded by Don Taylor	Minister for Tourism; 1973–1974	Succeeded by Bill Grayden
