= George Bennetts =

Australian politician (1890–1980)

George Bennetts (11 April 1890 - 27 March 1980) was an Australian politician. He was an Australian Labor Party member of the Western Australian Legislative Council from 1946 to 1965, representing South-East Province.

Bennetts was born at Wallaroo Mines in South Australia, but his family moved to the Kalgoorlie-Boulder area of Western Australia in 1896. His family's situation during his time in Boulder was reportedly "beset with difficulties", living in a home of hessian and bags and struggling with insufficient water rations. He was educated at Collick's school, the convent school on the Horseshoe Lease and the South Boulder School, but left school at fourteen. He was a builders' labourer, worked in the bicycle trade and carted sandalwood before joining the Western Australian Government Railways in 1911.

Initially working as a porter, Bennetts was promoted to acting conductor in the WAGR before joining the Commonwealth Railways in 1913. He worked in their construction branch during the construction of the Trans-Australian Railway and later as a porter and conductor for many years. Bennetts was a councillor of the Municipality of Kalgoorlie from 1935 to 1952, was variously president or secretary of the Commonwealth Railways section of the Australian Workers' Union for 30 years, was a justice of the peace from 1943 and a superintendent of St John's Ambulance at Kalgoorlie. Bennetts was an unsuccessful candidate for North-East Province in 1940.

Bennetts was elected to the Legislative Council at the 1946 biennial elections. He was a member of the Joint Printing Committee from 1953 to 1965. He left parliament in 1965.

Bennetts retired to Perth after leaving parliament and died in a convalescent home in Como in 1980. He was buried at Karrakatta Cemetery.
