= Ray Jones (Western Australia politician) =

Australian farmer and politician

The Honourable Ray Jones

Member of the Legislative Council of Western Australia
- In office 22 May 1950 – 21 May 1965
- Preceded by: None (new seat)
- Succeeded by: None (seat abolished)
- Constituency: Midland Province
- In office 22 May 1965 – 3 September 1967
- Preceded by: None (new seat)
- Succeeded by: Fred White
- Constituency: West Province

Personal details
- Born: 18 January 1909 Perth, Western Australia, Australia
- Died: 3 September 1967 (aged 58) Claremont, Western Australia, Australia
- Party: Country

Arthur Raymond Jones (18 January 1909 – 3 September 1967) was an Australian farmer and politician who served as a Country Party member of the Legislative Council of Western Australia from 1950 until his death.

Jones was born in Perth but was raised in the country, in the small Wheatbelt town of Miling. He began farming in the area in the 1930s, and later also farmed at Bindoon. Jones enlisted in the Royal Australian Air Force (RAAF) in March 1942. He was posted to a flying school at the time of his discharge in March 1945. In April 1948, Jones was elected to the Moora Road Board, where he served for four years. He entered parliament at the 1950 Legislative Council election, winning election to the new Midland Province. Jones was re-elected in 1956 and 1962, and then was appointed to West Province when Midland Province was abolished prior to the 1965 state election. After the 1959 election, he had been elected deputy chairman of committees. Jones died in office in September 1967, aged 58. He had married Mavis Mary Slater in February 1940, with whom he had two daughters.
