= Les Logan =

Australian politician

The Honourable Les Logan AM

Member of the Legislative Council of Western Australia
- In office 12 April 1947 – 3 March 1950
- Preceded by: Edmund Hall
- Succeeded by: None (reconstituted)
- Constituency: Central Province
- In office 3 March 1950 – 21 May 1965
- Preceded by: None (new seat)
- Succeeded by: None (abolished)
- Constituency: Midland Province
- In office 22 May 1965 – 21 May 1974
- Preceded by: None (new seat)
- Succeeded by: Margaret McAleer
- Constituency: Upper West Province

Minister for Local Government
- In office 2 April 1959 – 3 March 1971
- Premier: David Brand
- Preceded by: Frank Wise
- Succeeded by: Claude Stubbs

Minister for Town Planning
- In office 2 April 1959 – 3 March 1971
- Premier: David Brand
- Preceded by: Frank Wise
- Succeeded by: Herb Graham

Minister for Child Welfare
- In office 2 April 1959 – 3 March 1971
- Premier: David Brand
- Preceded by: Albert Hawke
- Succeeded by: Roger Nicholls (1995)

Personal details
- Born: 28 January 1908 Geraldton, Western Australia, Australia
- Died: 15 December 2000 (aged 92) Geraldton, Western Australia, Australia
- Party: Country
- Spouse: Edgarina Bond (m. 1931)
- Children: 4

Leslie Arthur Logan AM (28 January 1908 – 15 December 2000) was an Australian politician who was a Country Party member of the Legislative Council of Western Australia from 1947 to 1974. He served as a minister in the government of Sir David Brand.

Logan was born in Geraldton, Western Australia, to Laura (née Eaton) and Alan Logan. He was raised on a small farm near Northampton, and after leaving school worked for a few years in Geraldton before returning to take over the farm. He was prominent in local agricultural circles, and also served on the Northampton Road Board from 1940 to 1945. Logan entered parliament at a 1947 Legislative Council by-election for Central Province, caused by the resignation of Edmund Hall. He was re-elected in 1948, and following a redistribution in 1950 was appointed to the new Midland Province, which covered the same area. Logan was re-elected again in 1954, and in 1957 was made Country Party whip in the Legislative Council.

Following the 1959 state election, which saw the formation of a Liberal–Country coalition government, Logan was appointed Minister for Local Government, Minister for Town Planning, and Minister for Child Protection in the new ministry formed by David Brand. He held his positions until the government's defeat at the 1971 election, a period of almost 12 years. At the 1965 election, Logan had transferred to the new two-member Upper West Province, which he held until his retirement at the 1974 election. He was made a Member of the Order of Australia (AM) in 1980, "for service to parliament and to the community". After leaving politics, Logan retired to Geraldton, dying there in December 2000 (aged 92). He had married Edgarina Bond in 1931, with whom he had four daughters.

Parliament of Western Australia
Political offices
Preceded by Frank Wise	Minister for Local Government; 1959–1971	Succeeded by Claude Stubbs
Preceded by Frank Wise	Minister for Town Planning; 1959–1971	Succeeded by Herb Graham
Preceded by Albert Hawke	Minister for Child Welfare; 1959–1971	Abolished
