= Jack Thomson (politician) =

Australian politician

Member of the Legislative Council of Western Australia
- In office 22 May 1950 – 21 May 1974
- Preceded by: None (seat reconstituted)
- Succeeded by: Thomas Knight
- Constituency: South Province

Personal details
- Born: 11 June 1907 Katanning, Western Australia, Australia
- Died: 19 June 1997 (aged 90) Albany, Western Australia, Australia
- Party: Country

Jack McIntosh Thomson (11 June 1907 – 19 June 1997) was an Australian politician who served as a Country Party member of the Legislative Council of Western Australia from 1950 to 1974, representing South Province.

Thomson was born in Katanning, Western Australia, to Edith Maud (née Jenkinson) and Alexander Thomson. His father was also a member of parliament. Thomson boarded at Guildford Grammar School, Perth, and then followed his father into the building trade, eventually becoming a master builder. He lived in Albany, and served on the Albany Municipal Council from 1945 to 1951. Thomson entered parliament at the 1950 Legislative Council election. He effectively replaced his father in parliament, although a reconstitution meant that they technically represented different constituencies. Thomson was re-elected three times (in 1956, 1962, and 1968), eventually retiring from parliament at the 1974 state election. He served as deputy chairman of committees from 1968 to 1974. Thomson died in Albany in June 1997, aged 90. He had married Catherine Mary Hill in 1937, but had no children.
