= Ruby Hutchison =

Australian politician

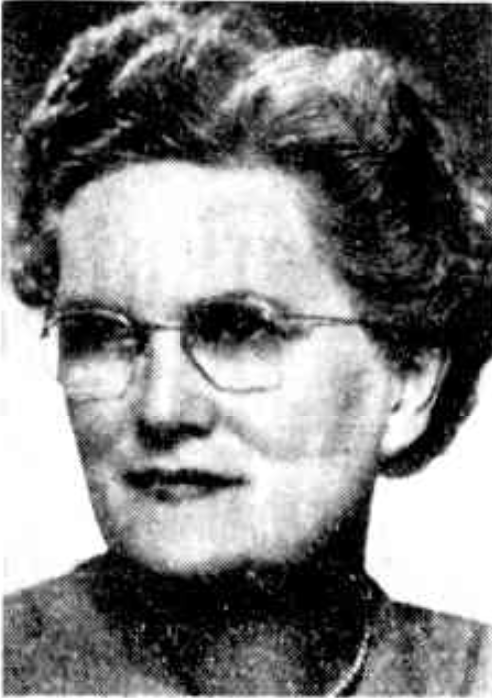
Ruby Hutchison, c1954, first woman elected to Western Australia's Legislative Council

Ruby Florence Hutchison (15 February 1892 – 17 December 1974) was an Australian politician. She was a Labor Party member of the Western Australian Legislative Council from 1954 to 1971, representing Suburban Province (1954–1965) and North-East Metropolitan Province (1965–1971).

She was the first woman to be elected to the Legislative Council, the fourth woman to be elected to the Parliament of Western Australia, and with her third marriage in 1966 to Frederick Lavery, the first woman in Australia to serve in parliament alongside her husband.

Prior to entering politics, she was a homemaker, ran boarding houses, and worked as a dressmaker. She was active in community organisations, among her roles being as the founding chairperson of the Epilepsy Association of Western Australia and a founding member of the Australian Consumers Association in Western Australia.

The Ruby Hutchison Memorial Lecture is held annually in her honour by the Australian Competition & Consumer Commission and Choice. She was posthumously inducted onto the Victorian Honour Roll of Women in 2001.
