= Eric Heenan (politician) =

Australian politician

Eric Michael Heenan (29 April 1900 – 26 June 1998) was an Australian politician. He was born in Kanowna, Western Australia to Michael Joseph Heenan and Josephine Frances (McCarthy) and educated at CBC Wakefield Street Adelaide, South Australia.

Articled to Neville Heenan in Northam.

Practiced Law in the Western Australian goldfields and Perth. Member of the Western Australian Legislative Council from 1936 to 1968.

Married Joan McKenna, one child Eric Michael Heenan.

Enlisted in Australian Army in the First World War 22 July 1918. Arrived in Durban on HMAT Boonah on way to Europe as peace declared.
