= Midland Province =

Former electoral province of Western Australia

Midland Province was an electoral province of the Legislative Council of Western Australia between 1950 and 1965. It elected three members throughout its existence.

== Members ==
Three members (1894–1950)
Member 1	Party	Term	Member 2	Party	Term	Member 3	Party	Term
Ray Jones	Country	1950–1965	Les Logan	Country	1950–1965	Charles Simpson	Liberal	1950–1963
Ray Jones	Country	1950–1965	Les Logan	Country	1950–1965	Jack Heitman	Liberal	1963–1965
