= Central Province (Western Australia) =

Electoral province of Western Australia

Central Province was an electoral province of the Legislative Council of Western Australia between 1894 and 1989. It elected three members between 1894 and 1965 and two members between 1965 and 1989.

== Members ==
Three members (1894–1965)
Member 1	Party	Term	Member 2	Party	Term	Member 3	Party	Term
Edward Wittenoom	None	1894–1898	Ernest Henty	None	1894–1895	Hugh McKernan	None	1894–1896
Edward Wittenoom	None	1894–1898	William Alexander	None	1895–1898	Hugh McKernan	None	1894–1896
Edward Wittenoom	None	1894–1898	William Alexander	None	1895–1898	Richard Haynes	None	1896–1902
William Loton	None	1898–1900	Frederic Whitcombe	None	1898–1900	Richard Haynes	None	1896–1902
John Drew	None	1900–1910	Frederic Whitcombe	None	1898–1900	Richard Haynes	None	1896–1902
John Drew	None	1900–1910	Con O'Brien	Labor	1901–1904	Richard Haynes	None	1896–1902
John Drew	None	1900–1910	Con O'Brien	Labor	1901–1904	Joseph Thomson	None	1902–1908
John Drew	None	1900–1910	William Patrick	None	1904–1910	Joseph Thomson	None	1902–1908
John Drew	None	1900–1910	William Patrick	None	1904–1910	Con O'Brien	Labor	1908–1914
John Drew	Labor	1910–1918	William Patrick	Liberal	1910–1914	Con O'Brien	Labor	1908–1914
John Drew	Labor	1910–1918	William Patrick	Country	1914–1916	Henry Carson	Country	1914–1920
John Drew	Labor	1910–1918	James Hickey	Labor	1916–1928	Henry Carson	Country	1914–1920
Joshua Mills	Ind. Nat.	1918–1923	James Hickey	Labor	1916–1928	Henry Carson	Country	1914–1920
Joshua Mills	Ind. Nat.	1918–1923	James Hickey	Labor	1916–1928	Thomas Moore	Labor	1920–1926
Joshua Mills	Country	1923–1924	James Hickey	Labor	1916–1928	Thomas Moore	Labor	1920–1926
Joshua Mills	Nationalist	1924	James Hickey	Labor	1916–1928	Thomas Moore	Labor	1920–1926
John Drew	Labor	1924–1947	James Hickey	Labor	1916–1928	Thomas Moore	Labor	1920–1926
John Drew	Labor	1924–1947	James Hickey	Labor	1916–1928	George Kempton	Country	1926–1932
John Drew	Labor	1924–1947	Edmund Hall	Country	1928–1947	George Kempton	Country	1926–1932
John Drew	Labor	1924–1947	Edmund Hall	Country	1928–1947	Thomas Moore	Labor	1932–1946
John Drew	Labor	1924–1947	Edmund Hall	Country	1928–1947	Charles Simpson	Liberal	1946–1950
John Drew	Labor	1924–1947	Les Logan	Country	1947–1950	Charles Simpson	Liberal	1946–1950
Harold Daffen	Liberal	1947–1950	Les Logan	Country	1947–1950	Charles Simpson	Liberal	1946–1950
Major reconstitution in 1950 – existing East Province effectively renamed Central Province and existing Central Province effectively renamed Midland Province.
Garnet Wood	Country	1950–1952	Charles Latham	Country	1950–1960	Norm Baxter	Country	1950–1958
Leslie Diver	Country	1952–1965	Charles Latham	Country	1950–1960	Norm Baxter	Country	1950–1958
Leslie Diver	Country	1952–1965	Charles Latham	Country	1950–1960	Charles Abbey	Liberal	1958–1965
Leslie Diver	Country	1952–1965	Norm Baxter	None	1960–1965	Charles Abbey	Liberal	1958–1965

Two members (1965–1989)
Member 1	Party	Term	Member 2	Party	Term
Leslie Diver	Country	1965–1971	Norm Baxter	Country	1965–1983
Harry Gayfer	Nat. Country	1974–1985	Norm Baxter	Country	1965–1983
Harry Gayfer	Nat. Country	1974–1985	Gordon Atkinson	Liberal	1983–1984
Harry Gayfer	Nat. Country	1974–1985	Eric Charlton	National (WA)	1984–1985
Harry Gayfer	National	1985–1989	Eric Charlton	National	1985–1989
