= 1965 Western Australian state election =

Australian state election

- 20 February 1965

All 50 seats in the Western Australian Legislative Assembly and 15 (of the 30) seats to the Western Australian Legislative Council 26 Assembly seats were needed for a majority
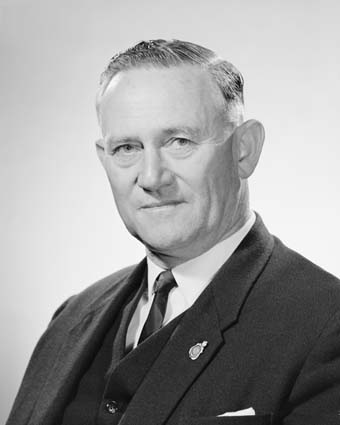

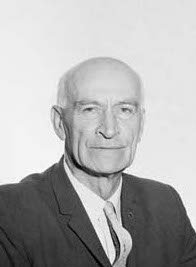
| | First party | Second party |
|---|---|---|
| Leader | David Brand | Albert Hawke |
| Party | Liberal/Country coalition | Labor |
| Leader since | 1 March 1957 | 3 July 1951 |
| Leader's seat | Greenough | Northam |
| Last election | 26 seats | 24 seats |
| Seats won | 29 seats | 21 seats |
| Seat change | ▲3 | ▼3 |
| Percentage | 52.89% | 42.64% |
| Swing | ▲5.78 | ▼1.77 |
Premier before election
David Brand
Liberal/Country coalition
Elected Premier
David Brand
Liberal/Country coalition

Elections were held in the state of Western Australia on 20 February 1965 to elect all 50 members to the Legislative Assembly and 15 members to the 30-seat Legislative Council. The Liberal-Country coalition government, led by Premier Sir David Brand, won a third term in office against the Labor Party, led by Opposition Leader Albert Hawke.

== Electoral changes ==
The Legislative Council election held on the same day was the first since significant changes to the Council's structure and manner of voting under the Constitution Acts Amendment Act (No.2) 1963 (No.72 of 1963). The Act abolished the 10 three-member provinces which had existed almost unaltered since 1900, and created 15 new two-member provinces. Voting became compulsory and the property franchise was abolished, and the practice of having separate Legislative Council elections in May of every even-numbered year was abolished—the Council's members would now go to the voters at the same elections as members of the Legislative Assembly, although the rotational system where one member per province would retire at each election remained in effect, and unlike the Assembly, the Council's term expired on 22 May every three years, rather than at the election itself.

A number of transitional arrangements were necessary to put these changes into effect. Those who had terms expiring on 21 May 1964, and five of the ten whose terms were to expire on 21 May 1966 (those who had the lowest winning margins at the 1960 election) would retire on 21 May 1965. The remaining 15 members were eligible to be appointed to new provinces for terms expiring on 21 May 1968.

== Results ==
=== Legislative Assembly ===
Western Australian state election, 20 February 1965 Legislative Assembly << 1962–1968 >>
| Enrolled voters | 335,633^{[1]} | | | | |
| Votes cast | 309,893 | | Turnout | 92.33% | –0.76% |
| Informal votes | 9,634 | | Informal | 3.11% | +1.32% |
Summary of votes by party
| Party | Primary votes | % | Swing | Seats | Change |
| Liberal and Country | 144,178 | 48.02% | +6.84% | 21 | + 3 |
| Labor | 128,025 | 42.64% | –1.77% | 21 | – 3 |
| Country | 14,630 | 4.87% | –1.06% | 8 | ± 0 |
| Democratic Labor | 2,825 | 0.94% | –1.32% | 0 | ± 0 |
| Communist | 284 | 0.09% | –0.32% | 0 | ± 0 |
| Ind. Lib. | 4,630 | 1.54% | –0.02% | 0 | ± 0 |
| Independent | 5,687 | 1.89% | –2.38% | 0 | ± 0 |
| Total | 300,259 | | | 50 | |

^{1} 408,462 electors were enrolled to vote at the election, but 11 seats (22% of the total) were uncontested—3 Labor seats (one less than 1962) representing 23,717 enrolled voters, 3 LCL seats (one less than 1962) representing 22,175 enrolled voters, and 5 Country seats (two more than 1962) representing 26,937 enrolled voters.

=== Legislative Council ===
Western Australian state election, 20 February 1965 Legislative Council << 1962–1968 >>
| Enrolled voters | 392,586 | | | | |
| Votes cast | 361,752 | | Turnout | 92.2 | +50.5 |
| Informal votes | 346,319 | | Informal | 4.3 | +3.9 |
Summary of votes by party
| Party | Primary votes | % | Swing | Seats won | Seats held |
| Liberal and Country | 176,051 | 50.8 | –7.6 | 8 | 12 |
| Labor | 134,694 | 38.9 | –2.6 | 4 | 10 |
| Country | 20,030 | 5.8 | * | 3 | 8 |
| Communist | 8,369 | 2.4 | +2.4 | 0 | 0 |
| Independent Liberal | 3,579 | 1.0 | +1.0 | 0 | 0 |
| Conservative | 1,749 | 0.5 | +0.5 | 0 | 0 |
| Independent | 1,847 | 0.5 | +0.5 | 0 | 0 |
| Total | 346,319 | | | 15 | 30 |

== Post-election pendulum ==
LCL/Country seats (29)
Marginal
| Canning | Ross Elliott | LCL | 0.7% |
| Perth | Peter Durack | LCL | 1.1% |
| Bunbury | Maurice Williams | LCL | 2.4% |
| Maylands | Bob Marshall | LCL | 2.6% |
Fairly safe
| Karrinyup | Les Nimmo | LCL | 6.0% |
| Subiaco | Hugh Guthrie | LCL | 8.3% |
| East Melville | Des O'Neil | LCL | 9.4% v IND |
| Dale | Gerald Wild | LCL | 9.8% |
Safe
| Darling Range | Ken Dunn | LCL | 10.9% |
| Cottesloe | Ross Hutchinson | LCL | 11.7% |
| Murchison | Richard Burt | LCL | 13.5% |
| Mount Lawley | Ray O'Connor | LCL | 13.6% |
| Wellington | Iven Manning | LCL | 13.6% |
| Murray | Ewart Runciman | LCL | 13.8% v IND |
| Moore | Edgar Lewis | CP | 18.0% v IND |
| Wembley | Guy Henn | LCL | 19.6% |
| Vasse | Stewart Bovell | LCL | 20.4% |
| Toodyay | James Craig | CP | 24.2% v IND |
| Claremont | Harold Crommelin | LCL | 27.0% |
| Narrogin | William Manning | CP | 30.5% v IND |
| Nedlands | Charles Court | LCL | 30.9% |
| Avon | Harry Gayfer | CP | unopp. |
| Blackwood | John Hearman | LCL | unopp. |
| Greenough | David Brand | LCL | unopp. |
| Katanning | Crawford Nalder | CP | unopp. |
| Mount Marshall | George Cornell | CP | unopp. |
| Roe | Tom Hart | CP | unopp. |
| South Perth | Bill Grayden | LCL | unopp. |
| Stirling | Clayton Mitchell | CP | unopp. |

Labor seats (21)
Marginal
| Belmont | James Hegney | ALP | 2.3% |
| Mount Hawthorn | Bill Hegney | ALP | 2.7% |
| Geraldton | Bill Sewell | ALP | 3.0% |
| Warren | Joseph Rowberry | ALP | 3.1% |
| Balcatta | Herb Graham | ALP | 3.7% |
| Bayswater | Merv Toms | ALP | 3.8% |
| Merredin-Yilgarn | Lionel Kelly | ALP | 4.9% |
Fairly safe
| Melville | John Tonkin | ALP | 7.0% |
| Northam | Albert Hawke | ALP | 7.9% |
| Albany | Jack Hall | ALP | 9.6% |
Safe
| Beeloo | Colin Jamieson | ALP | 10.1% |
| Collie | Harry May | ALP | 10.9% |
| Kimberley | John Rhatigan | ALP | 11.6% |
| Victoria Park | Ron Davies | ALP | 14.0% |
| Gascoyne | Daniel Norton | ALP | 15.8% |
| Pilbara | Arthur Bickerton | ALP | 17.2% |
| Fremantle | Harry Fletcher | ALP | 17.4% |
| Swan | John Brady | ALP | 18.7% |
| Boulder-Eyre | Arthur Moir | ALP | unopp. |
| Cockburn | Henry Curran | ALP | unopp. |
| Kalgoorlie | Tom Evans | ALP | unopp. |

== See also ==
- Members of the Western Australian Legislative Assembly, 1962–1965
- Members of the Western Australian Legislative Assembly, 1965–1968
- Candidates of the 1965 Western Australian state election
