= North Province (Western Australia) =

Electoral province of Western Australia

North Province was an electoral province of the Legislative Council of Western Australia between 1894 and 1989. It elected three members between 1894 and 1965 and two members between 1965 and 1989.

== Members ==
Three members (1900–1965)
Member 1	Party	Term	Member 2	Party	Term	Member 3	Party	Term
Frank Stone	None	1894–1906	John Richardson	None	1894–1904	Edward Robinson	None	1894–1896
Frank Stone	None	1894–1906	John Richardson	None	1894–1904	Donald McDonald MacKay	None	1896–1902
Frank Stone	None	1894–1906	John Richardson	None	1894–1904	Sir Edward Wittenoom	None	1902–1906
Frank Stone	None	1894–1906	R. F. Sholl	None	1904–1909	Sir Edward Wittenoom	None	1902–1906
Francis Connor	None	1906–1911	R. F. Sholl	None	1904–1909	Sir Edward Wittenoom	None	1902–1906
Francis Connor	None	1906–1911	R. F. Sholl	None	1904–1909	Richard Pennefather	None	1907–1911
Francis Connor	None	1906–1911	Sir Edward Wittenoom	None	1910–1911	Richard Pennefather	None	1907–1911
Francis Connor	Independent	1911–1916	Sir Edward Wittenoom	Liberal	1911–1917	Richard Pennefather	Independent	1911–1914
Francis Connor	Independent	1911–1916	Sir Edward Wittenoom	Liberal	1911–1917	Joseph Holmes	Independent	1914–1942
George Miles	Independent	1916–1930	Sir Edward Wittenoom	Liberal	1911–1917	Joseph Holmes	Independent	1914–1942
George Miles	Independent	1916–1930	Sir Edward Wittenoom	Nationalist	1917–1934	Joseph Holmes	Independent	1914–1942
George Miles	Nationalist	1930–1936	Sir Edward Wittenoom	Nationalist	1917–1934	Joseph Holmes	Independent	1914–1942
George Miles	Nationalist	1930–1936	Edward Angelo	Nationalist	1934–1940	Joseph Holmes	Independent	1914–1942
George Miles	Independent	1936–1950	Edward Angelo	Nationalist	1934–1940	Joseph Holmes	Independent	1914–1942
George Miles	Independent	1936–1950	Frank Welsh	Nationalist	1940–1945	Joseph Holmes	Independent	1914–1942
George Miles	Independent	1936–1950	Frank Welsh	Nationalist	1940–1945	Cyril Cornish	Independent	1942–1946
George Miles	Independent	1936–1950	Frank Welsh	Liberal	1945–1954	Cyril Cornish	Independent	1942–1946
George Miles	Independent	1936–1950	Frank Welsh	Liberal	1945–1954	Mervyn Forrest	Liberal	1946–1952
Harry Strickland	Labor	1950–1965	Frank Welsh	Liberal	1945–1954	Mervyn Forrest	Liberal	1946–1952
Harry Strickland	Labor	1950–1965	Frank Welsh	Liberal	1945–1954	Don Barker	Labor	1952–1956
Harry Strickland	Labor	1950–1965	William Willesee	Labor	1954–1965	Don Barker	Labor	1952–1956
Harry Strickland	Labor	1950–1965	William Willesee	Labor	1954–1965	Frank Wise	Labor	1956–1965

Two members (1965–1989)
Member 1	Party	Term	Member 2	Party	Term
Frank Wise	Labor	1965–1971	Harry Strickland	Labor	1965–1970
Frank Wise	Labor	1965–1971	John Hunt	Labor	1971–1974
Bill Withers	Liberal	1971–1981	John Hunt	Labor	1971–1974
Bill Withers	Liberal	1971–1981	John Tozer	Liberal	1974–1980
Bill Withers	Liberal	1971–1981	Peter Dowding	Labor	1980–1986
Bill Withers	Independent	1981–1982	Peter Dowding	Labor	1980–1986
Tom Stephens	Labor	1982–1989	Peter Dowding	Labor	1980–1986
Tom Stephens	Labor	1982–1989	Tom Helm	Labor	1986–1989
