= West Province (Western Australia) =

West Province Western Australia—Legislative Council
- State: Western Australia
- Created: 1894
- Abolished: 1989

West Province was an electoral province of the Legislative Council of Western Australia between 1894 and 1989. It elected three members from 1894 to 1965 and two members from 1965 to 1989.

== Members ==
Three members (1894–1965)
Member 1	Party	Term	Member 2	Party	Term	Member 3	Party	Term
Daniel Congdon	None	1894–1900	Edward Davies	None	1894–1896	Harry Marshall	None	1894–1895
Daniel Congdon	None	1894–1900	Edward Davies	None	1894–1896	Alfred Kidson	None	1895–1902
Daniel Congdon	None	1894–1900	Sir Henry Briggs	None	1896–1911	Alfred Kidson	None	1895–1902
Matthew Moss	None	1900–1901	Sir Henry Briggs	None	1896–1911	Alfred Kidson	None	1895–1902
Robert Laurie	None	1901–1912	Sir Henry Briggs	None	1896–1911	Alfred Kidson	None	1895–1902
Robert Laurie	None	1901–1912	Sir Henry Briggs	None	1896–1911	Matthew Moss	None	1902–1911
Robert Laurie	Liberal	1911–1912	Sir Henry Briggs	Liberal	1911–1917	Matthew Moss	Liberal	1911–1914
Robert Lynn	Liberal	1912–1917	Sir Henry Briggs	Liberal	1911–1917	Matthew Moss	Liberal	1911–1914
Robert Lynn	Liberal	1912–1917	Sir Henry Briggs	Liberal	1911–1917	Joseph Allen	Liberal	1914–1917
Robert Lynn	Nationalist	1917–1924	Sir Henry Briggs	Nationalist	1917–1919	Joseph Allen	Nationalist	1917–1920
Robert Lynn	Nationalist	1917–1924	Alexander Panton	Labor	1919–1922	Joseph Allen	Nationalist	1917–1920
Robert Lynn	Nationalist	1917–1924	Alexander Panton	Labor	1919–1922	Frederick Baglin	Labor	1920–1923
Robert Lynn	Nationalist	1917–1924	George Potter	Nationalist	1922–1928	Frederick Baglin	Labor	1920–1923
Robert Lynn	Nationalist	1917–1924	George Potter	Nationalist	1922–1928	Edmund Gray	Labor	1923–1952
William Kitson	Labor	1924–1947	George Potter	Nationalist	1922–1928	Edmund Gray	Labor	1923–1952
William Kitson	Labor	1924–1947	Gilbert Fraser	Labor	1928–1958	Edmund Gray	Labor	1923–1952
Evan Davies	Labor	1947–1963	Gilbert Fraser	Labor	1928–1958	Edmund Gray	Labor	1923–1952
Evan Davies	Labor	1947–1963	Gilbert Fraser	Labor	1928–1958	Frederick Lavery	Labor	1952–1965
Evan Davies	Labor	1947–1963	Ronald Thompson	Labor	1959–1965	Frederick Lavery	Labor	1952–1965
Jerry Dolan	Labor	1963–1965	Ronald Thompson	Labor	1959–1965	Frederick Lavery	Labor	1952–1965

Two members (1965–1989)
Member 1	Party	Term	Member 2	Party	Term
Charles Abbey	Liberal	1965–1977	Ray Jones	Country	1965–1967
Charles Abbey	Liberal	1965–1977	Fred White	Country	1967–1973
Charles Abbey	Liberal	1965–1977	Gordon Masters	Liberal	1974–1989
Neil Oliver	Liberal	1977–1989	Gordon Masters	Liberal	1974–1989
