= Members of the Western Australian Legislative Council, 1914–1916 =

This is a list of members of the Western Australian Legislative Council from 22 May 1914 to 21 May 1916. The chamber had 30 seats made up of ten provinces each electing three members, on a system of rotation whereby one-third of the members would retire at each biennial election.

Name	Party	Province	Term expires	Years in office
Joseph Allen	Liberal	West	1920	1914–1920
Richard Ardagh	Labor	North-East	1918	1912–1924
Charles Baxter	Country	East	1920	1914–1950
Henry Briggs	Liberal	West	1916	1896–1919
Henry Carson	Country	Central	1920	1914–1920
Ephraim Clarke	Liberal	South-West	1920	1901–1921
Hal Colebatch	Liberal	East	1918	1912–1923
Francis Connor	Independent	North	1918	1906–1916
James Cornell	Labor	South	1918	1912–1946
Joseph Cullen	Liberal	South-East	1918	1909–1917
Jabez Dodd	Labor	South	1916	1910–1928
John Drew	Labor	Central	1918	1900–1918; 1924–1947
Joseph Duffell	Liberal	Metropolitan-Suburban	1920	1914–1926
Douglas Gawler^{[2]}	Liberal	Metropolitan-Suburban	1916	1910–1915
James Greig^{[3]}	Country	South-East	1920	1916–1925
Sir John Winthrop Hackett^{[4]}	Liberal	South-West	1918	1890–1916
Vernon Hamersley	Liberal	East	1916	1904–1946
Joseph Holmes	Liberal/Ind.	North	1920	1914–1942
Arthur Jenkins	Liberal	Metropolitan	1920	1898–1904; 1908–1917
Walter Kingsmill	Liberal	Metropolitan	1916	1903–1922
John Kirwan	Independent	South	1920	1908–1946
Robert Lynn	Liberal	West	1918	1912–1924
Cuthbert McKenzie	Country	South-East	1916	1910–1922
Robert McKenzie	Liberal	North-East	1916	1904–1916
Edward McLarty	Liberal	South-West	1916	1894–1916
Harry Millington	Labor	North-East	1920	1914–1920
William Patrick	Country	Central	1916	1904–1916
Charles Piesse^{[1]}	Liberal	South-East	1920	1894–1914
Archibald Sanderson	Liberal	Metropolitan-Suburban	1918	1912–1922
Athelstan Saw^{[2]}	Liberal	Metropolitan-Suburban	1916	1915–1929
George Sewell^{[1]}^{[3]}	Country	South-East	1920	1914–1916
Charles Sommers	Liberal	Metropolitan	1918	1900–1918
Sir Edward Wittenoom	Liberal	North	1916	1883–1884; 1885–1886; 1894–1898; 1902–1906; 1910–1934

== Notes ==
^{1} On 13 July 1914, South-East Liberal MLC Charles Piesse died. Country candidate George Sewell won the resulting by-election on 18 August 1914.
^{2} On 16 May 1915, Metropolitan-Suburban Province Liberal MLC Douglas Gawler died. Liberal candidate Athelstan Saw won the resulting by-election on 26 June 1915.
^{3} On 8 March 1916, South-East Country MLC George Sewell died. Country candidate James Greig was returned unopposed on 20 April 1916.
^{4} On 19 February 1916, South-West Province Liberal MLC John Winthrop Hackett died. A by-election was called to coincide with the upcoming Council elections on 13 May 1916.

== Sources ==
- Black, David (1991). Legislative Council of Western Australia : membership register, electoral law and statistics, 1890-1989. Perth: Parliamentary History Project. ISBN 0-7309-3641-4.
- Hughes, Colin A.; Aitkin, Don (1986). Voting for the Australian State Upper Houses, 1890-1984. Canberra: Australian National University. ISBN 0-909779-18-X.
- Black, David; Bolton, Geoffrey (2001a). Biographical Register of Members of the Parliament of Western Australia. Vol. One: 1870–1930 (Revised ed.). Parliament House: Parliament of Western Australia. ISBN 0730738140.
