= Members of the Western Australian Legislative Council, 1932–1934 =

This is a list of members of the Western Australian Legislative Council from 22 May 1932 to 21 May 1934. The chamber had 30 seats made up of ten provinces each electing three members, on a system of rotation whereby one-third of the members would retire at each biennial election.

Name	Party	Province	Term expires	Years in office
Frederick Allsop^{[1]}	Nationalist	North-East	1936	1930–1932
Charles Baxter	Country	East	1938	1914–1950
Leonard Bolton	Nationalist	Metropolitan	1936	1932–1948
Alec Clydesdale	Labor	Metropolitan-Suburban	1938	1932–1938
James Cornell	Nationalist	South	1936	1912–1946
Les Craig^{[3]}	Nationalist	South-West	1936	1934–1956
John Drew^{[2]}	Labor	Central	1936	1900–1918; 1924–1947
Charles Elliott^{[4]}	Nationalist	North-East	1938	1934–1938
John Ewing^{[3]}	Nationalist	South-West	1936	1916–1933
James Franklin	Nationalist	Metropolitan	1934	1928–1940
Gilbert Fraser	Labor	West	1934	1928–1958
Edmund Gray	Labor	West	1938	1923–1952
Edmund Hall	Country	Central	1934	1928–1947
Vernon Hamersley	Country	East	1934	1904–1946
Edgar Harris^{[4]}	Nationalist	North-East	1938	1920–1934
Joseph Holmes	Independent	North	1938	1914–1942
Sir John Kirwan	Independent	South	1938	1908–1946
William Kitson	Labor	West	1936	1924–1947
James Macfarlane	Nationalist	Metropolitan-Suburban	1936	1922–1928; 1930–1942
William Mann	Nationalist	South-West	1938	1926–1951
George Miles	Nationalist	North	1936	1916–1950
Richard Moore^{[1]}	Nationalist	North-East	1936	1932–1936
Thomas Moore	Labor	Central	1938	1920–1926; 1932–1946
Sir Charles Nathan	Nationalist	Metropolitan-Suburban	1934	1930–1934
John Nicholson	Nationalist	Metropolitan	1938	1918–1941
Harold Piesse	Ind. Country	South-East	1938	1932–1946
Edwin Rose	Nationalist	South-West	1934	1916–1934
Harold Seddon	Nationalist	North-East	1934	1922–1954
Alec Thomson	Country	South-East	1936	1931–1950
Charles Williams	Labor	South	1934	1928–1948
Charles Wittenoom	Country	South-East	1934	1928–1940
Sir Edward Wittenoom	Nationalist	North	1934	1883–1884; 1885–1886; 1894–1898; 1902–1906; 1910–1934
Herbert Yelland	Country	East	1936	1924–1936

== Notes ==
^{1} On 15 September 1932, North-East Province Nationalist MLC Frederick Allsop died. Nationalist candidate Richard Moore won the resulting by-election on 29 October 1932.
^{2} On 24 April 1933, Central Province Labor MLC John Drew was appointed Chief Secretary in the new Ministry led by Philip Collier. He was therefore required to resign and contest a ministerial by-election, at which he was returned unopposed on 2 May 1933.
^{3} On 30 November 1933, South-West Province Nationalist MLC John Ewing died. Nationalist candidate Les Craig won the resulting by-election on 20 January 1934.
^{4} On 13 February 1934, North-East Province Nationalist MLC Edgar Harris died. Nationalist candidate Charles Elliott won the resulting by-election on 17 March 1934.

== Sources ==
- Black, David (1991). Legislative Council of Western Australia : membership register, electoral law and statistics, 1890-1989. Perth: Parliamentary History Project. ISBN 0-7309-3641-4.
- Hughes, Colin A.; Aitkin, Don (1986). Voting for the Australian State Upper Houses, 1890-1984. Canberra: Australian National University. ISBN 0-909779-18-X.
- Black, David; Bolton, Geoffrey (2001b). Biographical Register of Members of the Parliament of Western Australia. Vol. Two: 1930-1990 (Revised ed.). Parliament House: Parliament of Western Australia. ISBN 0731697839.
