= Members of the Western Australian Legislative Council, 1894–1896 =

This is a list of members of the Western Australian Legislative Council from 16 July 1894 to 27 July 1896. The chamber had 21 seats made up of seven provinces each electing three members, on a system of rotation whereby one-third of the members would retire at each biennial election. As this was the first election of the Legislative Council under responsible government in Western Australia, following the passage of the Constitution Act Amendment Act 1893, all seats were vacant at the time of the election, and therefore the candidate with most votes in each province was elected for six years, the second-most for four years and the third-most for two years.

Name	Province	Term expires	Years in office
William Alexander^{[3]}	Central	1898	1895–1898
Henry Briggs^{[4]}	West	1898	1896–1919
R. G. Burges	East	1898	1894–1903
Daniel Keen Congdon	West	1900	1887–1890; 1892–1900
Frederick Crowder	South-East	1900	1894–1900; 1901–1902
Edward Davies^{[4]}	West	1898	1894–1896
Charles Dempster	East	1900	1873–1874; 1894–1907
John Foulkes	South-West	1896	1894–1896
John Winthrop Hackett	South-West	1900	1890–1916
Richard Hardey	East	1896	1876–1880; 1890–1896
Samuel Haynes	South-East	1898	1894–1910
Ernest Henty^{[3]}	Central	1898	1894–1895
Hugh McKernan	Central	1896	1894–1896
Alfred Kidson^{[2]}	West	1896	1895–1902
Edward McLarty	South-West	1898	1894–1916
Harry Marshall^{[2]}	West	1896	1894–1895
Stephen Henry Parker	Metropolitan	1898	1878–1888; 1889–1890; 1892–1897
Charles Piesse	South-East	1896	1894–1914
John Richardson	North	1898	1894–1904
Edward Robinson	North	1896	1894–1896
Henry Saunders	Metropolitan	1896	1894–1902; 1918–1919
Sir George Shenton	Metropolitan	1900	1870–1873; 1875–1906
Frank Stone	North	1900	1894–1906
Edward Wittenoom^{[1]}	Central	1900	1883–1884; 1885–1886; 1894–1898; 1902–1906; 1910–1934

== Notes ==
^{1} On 19 December 1894, Edward Wittenoom (Central Province) was appointed Minister for Mines in the Forrest Ministry. He was therefore required to resign and submit to a ministerial by-election, and was returned unopposed on 17 January 1895.
^{2} On 11 July 1895, the seat held by Harry Marshall (West Province) was declared vacant due to bankruptcy. Alfred Kidson was elected unopposed to fill the remainder of the term.
^{3} On 25 June 1895, Ernest Henty (Central Province) died, and a by-election was held on 25 July 1895, at which William Alexander was elected to fill the remainder of the term.
^{4} On 9 June 1896, Edward Davies (West Province) resigned, and a by-election was held on 30 June 1896, at which Henry Briggs was elected to fill the remainder of the term.

== Sources ==
- Black, David (1991). Legislative Council of Western Australia : membership register, electoral law and statistics, 1890-1989. Perth: Parliamentary History Project. ISBN 0-7309-3641-4.
- Hughes, Colin A.; Aitkin, Don (1986). Voting for the Australian State Upper Houses, 1890-1984. Canberra: Australian National University. ISBN 0-909779-18-X.
