= Members of the Western Australian Legislative Council, 1896–1898 =

This is a list of members of the Western Australian Legislative Council from 27 July 1896 to 9 May 1898. The chamber had 21 seats made up of seven provinces each electing three members, on a system of rotation whereby one-third of the members would retire at each biennial election. The Constitution Act Amendment Act 1896, which passed after the 1896 Council election, created a new seat of North-East Province, which had its inaugural election on 29 June 1897 with terms expiring in 1904, 1902 and 1900.

Name	Province	Term expires	Years in office
William Alexander	Central	1898	1895–1898
Henry Briggs	West	1898	1896–1919
R. G. Burges	East	1898	1894–1903
Daniel Keen Congdon	West	1900	1887–1890; 1892–1900
Frederick Crowder	South-East	1900	1894–1900; 1901–1902
Charles Dempster	East	1900	1873–1874; 1894–1907
John Winthrop Hackett	South-West	1900	1890–1916
Richard Septimus Haynes	Central	1902	1896–1902
Samuel Johnson Haynes	South-East	1898	1894–1910
Andrew Henning	North-East	1898	1897–1898
Alfred Kidson	West	1902	1895–1902
Donald McDonald MacKay	North	1902	1896–1902
Edward McLarty	South-West	1898	1894–1916
Alexander Matheson	North-East	1902	1897–1901
Stephen Henry Parker^{[1]}	Metropolitan	1898	1878–1888; 1889–1890; 1892–1897
Harold George Parsons	North-East	1900	1897–1900
Charles Piesse	South-East	1902	1894–1914
George Randell^{[1]}	Metropolitan	1898	1875–1878; 1880–1890; 1893–1894; 1897–1910
John Richardson	North	1898	1894–1904
Henry Saunders	Metropolitan	1902	1894–1902; 1918–1919
Sir George Shenton	Metropolitan	1900	1870–1873; 1875–1906
William Spencer	South-West	1902	1896–1901
Frank Stone	North	1900	1894–1906
John Howard Taylor	East	1902	1896–1899
Edward Wittenoom	Central	1900	1883–1884; 1885–1886; 1894–1898; 1902–1906; 1910–1934

== Notes ==
^{1} On 28 April 1897, Stephen Henry Parker (Metropolitan Province) resigned, and a by-election was held on 28 May 1897, at which George Randell was elected to fill the remainder of the term.

== Sources ==
- Black, David (1991). Legislative Council of Western Australia : membership register, electoral law and statistics, 1890-1989. Perth: Parliamentary History Project. ISBN 0-7309-3641-4.
- Hughes, Colin A.; Aitkin, Don (1986). Voting for the Australian State Upper Houses, 1890-1984. Canberra: Australian National University. ISBN 0-909779-18-X.
