= Members of the Western Australian Legislative Council, 1898–1900 =

This is a list of members of the Western Australian Legislative Council from 9 May 1898 to 14 May 1900. The chamber had 24 seats made up of eight provinces each electing three members, on a system of rotation whereby one-third of the members would retire at each biennial election.

Name	Province	Term expires	Years in office
Henry Briggs	West	1904	1896–1919
R. G. Burges	East	1904	1894–1903
Daniel Keen Congdon	West	1900	1887–1890; 1892–1900
Frederick Crowder	South-East	1900	1894–1900; 1901–1902
Charles Dempster	East	1900	1873–1874; 1894–1907
John Winthrop Hackett	South-West	1900	1890–1916
Richard Septimus Haynes	Central	1902	1896–1902
Samuel Johnson Haynes	South-East	1904	1894–1910
Arthur Jenkins	North-East	1904	1898–1904; 1908–1917
Alfred Kidson	West	1902	1895–1902
William Loton^{[1]}	Central	1900	1889–1890; 1898–1900; 1902–1908
Henry Lukin^{[2]}	East	1902	1899–1901
Donald McDonald MacKay	North	1902	1896–1902
Edward McLarty	South-West	1904	1894–1916
Alexander Matheson	North-East	1902	1897–1901
Harold George Parsons	North-East	1900	1897–1900
Charles Piesse	South-East	1902	1894–1914
George Randell	Metropolitan	1904	1875–1878; 1880–1890; 1893–1894; 1897–1910
John Richardson	North	1904	1894–1904
Henry Saunders	Metropolitan	1902	1894–1902; 1918–1919
Sir George Shenton	Metropolitan	1900	1870–1873; 1875–1906
William Spencer	South-West	1902	1896–1901
Frank Stone	North	1900	1894–1906
John Taylor^{[2]}	East	1902	1896–1899
Frederic Whitcombe	Central	1904	1898–1900

== Notes ==
^{1} On 28 April 1898, Central Province MLC Edward Wittenoom resigned. William Loton was elected on 13 June 1898 to fill the remaining two years of his term.
^{1} On 9 June 1899, East Province MLC John Taylor resigned. Henry Lukin was elected on 11 July 1899 to fill the remainder of his term.

== Sources ==
- Black, David (1991). Legislative Council of Western Australia : membership register, electoral law and statistics, 1890-1989. Perth: Parliamentary History Project. ISBN 0-7309-3641-4.
- Hughes, Colin A.; Aitkin, Don (1986). Voting for the Australian State Upper Houses, 1890-1984. Canberra: Australian National University. ISBN 0-909779-18-X.
