= Members of the Western Australian Legislative Council, 1950–1952 =

This is a list of members of the Western Australian Legislative Council from 22 May 1950 to 21 May 1952. The chamber had 30 seats made up of ten provinces each electing three members, on a system of rotation whereby one-third of the members would retire at each biennial election.

Several of the provinces were renamed at the election. The Electoral Districts Act 1947 had obviated the need for Parliament to redistribute seats itself, instead appointing three Electoral Commissioners who were to review the boundaries according to certain defined criteria. The redistribution was gazetted on 21 December 1948, but did not come into effect until 22 May 1950.

The changes of names were as follows:

- Central Province → Midland Province
- East Province → Central Province
- Metropolitan-Suburban Province → Suburban Province
- South Province → South-East Province
- South-East Province → South Province

Name	Party	Province	Term expires	Years in office
Charles Baxter^{[1]}	Country	Central	1952	1914–1950
Norm Baxter^{[1]}	Country	Central	1952	1950–1958; 1960–1983
George Bennetts	Labor	South-East	1952	1946–1965
Robert Boylen	Labor	South-East	1956	1947–1955
Les Craig	Liberal	South-West	1956	1934–1956
John Cunningham	Liberal	South-East	1948	1948–1954; 1955–1962
Evan Davies	Labor	West	1956	1947–1963
James Dimmitt	Liberal	Suburban	1952	1938–1953
Leslie Diver^{[4]}	Country	Central	1956	1952–1974
Mervyn Forrest	Liberal	North	1952	1946–1952
Gilbert Fraser	Labor	West	1954	1928–1958
Sir Frank Gibson	Liberal	Suburban	1956	1942–1956
Edmund Gray	Labor	West	1952	1923–1952
William Hall	Labor	North-East	1952	1938–1963
Harry Hearn	Liberal	Metropolitan	1954	1948–1956
Eric Heenan	Labor	North-East	1956	1936–1968
Charles Henning^{[2]}	Liberal	South-West	1954	1951–1955
James Hislop	Liberal	Metropolitan	1952	1941–1971
Ray Jones	Country	Midland	1956	1950–1967
Sir Charles Latham	Country	Central	1954	1946–1960
Les Logan	Country	Midland	1954	1947–1974
Anthony Loton	Country	South	1952	1944–1965
William Mann^{[3]}	Liberal	South-West	1952	1926–1951
James Murray^{[3]}	Liberal	South-West	1952	1951–1965
Hubert Parker	Liberal	Suburban	1954	1934–1954
Hugh Roche	Country	South	1954	1940–1960
Sir Harold Seddon	Liberal	North-East	1954	1922–1954
Charles Simpson	Liberal	Midland	1952	1946–1963
Harry Strickland	Labor	North	1956	1950–1970
Jack Thomson	Country	South	1956	1950–1974
Hobart Tuckey^{[2]}	Liberal	South-West	1954	1934–1951
Keith Watson	Liberal	Metropolitan	1956	1948–1968
Frank Welsh	Liberal	North	1954	1940–1954
Garnet Barrington Wood^{[4]}	Country	Central	1956	1936–1952

== Notes ==
^{1} On 2 March 1950, Central (formerly East) Province Country MLC Charles Baxter died. His son Norm Baxter won the resulting by-election on 6 May 1950.
^{2} On 10 March 1951, South-West Province Liberal MLC Hobart Tuckey died. Liberal candidate Charles Henning won the resulting by-election on 2 June 1951.
^{3} On 22 April 1951, South-West Province Liberal MLC William Mann died. Liberal candidate James Murray won the resulting by-election on 2 June 1951.
^{4} On 3 January 1952, Central (formerly East) Province Country MLC Garnet Barrington Wood died. Country Party candidate Leslie Diver won the resulting by-election on 3 May 1952.

== Sources ==
- Black, David (1991). Legislative Council of Western Australia : membership register, electoral law and statistics, 1890-1989. Perth: Parliamentary History Project. ISBN 0-7309-3641-4.
- Hughes, Colin A.; Aitkin, Don (1986). Voting for the Australian State Upper Houses, 1890-1984. Canberra: Australian National University. ISBN 0-909779-18-X.
- Black, David; Bolton, Geoffrey (2001b). Biographical Register of Members of the Parliament of Western Australia. Vol. Two: 1930-1990 (Revised ed.). Parliament House: Parliament of Western Australia. ISBN 0731697839.
- "Electoral Districts Act 1947 - Order in Council". Western Australia Government Gazette. 21 December 1948. p. 1948:3027-3036.
