= Members of the Western Australian Legislative Council, 1908–1910 =

This is a list of members of the Western Australian Legislative Council from 22 May 1908 to 21 May 1910. The chamber had 30 seats made up of ten provinces each electing three members, on a system of rotation whereby one-third of the members would retire at each biennial election.

Name	Province	Term expires	Years in office
Henry Briggs	West	1910	1896–1919
Thomas Brimage	North-East	1912	1900–1912
Ephraim Clarke	South-West	1914	1901–1921
James Connolly	North-East	1914	1901–1914
Francis Connor	North	1912	1906–1916
Joseph Cullen^{[1]}	South-East	1912	1909–1917
John Drew	Central	1912	1900–1918; 1924–1947
John Glowrey	South	1912	1900–1904; 1906–1912
John Winthrop Hackett	South-West	1912	1890–1916
Vernon Hamersley	East	1910	1904–1946
Samuel Haynes	South-East	1910	1894–1910
Arthur Jenkins	Metropolitan	1914	1898–1904; 1908–1917
Walter Kingsmill	Metropolitan-Suburban	1910	1903–1922
John Kirwan	South	1914	1908–1946
Joseph Langsford	Metropolitan-Suburban	1912	1904–1911
Robert Laurie	West	1912	1901–1912
Robert McKenzie	North-East	1910	1904–1916
Edward McLarty	South-West	1910	1894–1916
Wesley Maley^{[1]}	South-East	1912	1900–1909
Matthew Moss	West	1914	1900–1901; 1902–1914
William Oats	South	1910	1904–1910
Con O'Brien	Central	1914	1901–1904; 1908–1914
William Patrick	Central	1910	1904–1916
Richard Pennefather	North	1914	1907–1914
Charles Piesse	South-East	1914	1894–1914
George Randell	Metropolitan	1910	1875–1878; 1880–1890; 1893–1894; 1897–1910
Robert Frederick Sholl^{[2]}	North	1910	1886–1890; 1904–1909
Charles Sommers	Metropolitan	1912	1900–1918
Sydney Stubbs	Metropolitan-Suburban	1914	1908–1911
George Throssell	East	1912	1907–1910
Thomas Wilding	East	1914	1908–1914
Sir Edward Wittenoom^{[2]}	North	1910	1883–1884; 1885–1886; 1894–1898; 1902–1906; 1910–1934

== Notes ==
^{1} On 7 September 1909, South-East MLC Wesley Maley resigned. Joseph Cullen won the resulting by-election on 1 October 1907.
^{2} On 8 December 1909, North Province MLC Robert Frederick Sholl died. Edward Wittenoom was returned unopposed on 8 January 1910.

== Sources ==
- Black, David (1991). Legislative Council of Western Australia : membership register, electoral law and statistics, 1890-1989. Perth: Parliamentary History Project. ISBN 0-7309-3641-4.
- Hughes, Colin A.; Aitkin, Don (1986). Voting for the Australian State Upper Houses, 1890-1984. Canberra: Australian National University. ISBN 0-909779-18-X.
