= List of Western Australian Legislative Council by-elections =

The list of Western Australia Legislative Council by-elections includes every by-election held in the Australian state of Western Australia for the Legislative Council. Prior to the Acts Amendment (Electoral Reform) Act 1987 which came into force at the 1989 election, it was necessary for a by-election to be held to fill any vacancy; they have since been filled by recounts from the previous poll based on a proportional voting system. An imminent Council election often allowed the vacancy to remain until the inauguration of the new Council, usually on the following 22 May.

== Ministerial by-elections ==
Until a constitutional amendment in 1947, it was necessary for members who were appointed as a Minister to resign their seat and contest their seat at a ministerial by-election. This was because the Ministers became members of the Executive Council, which reported to the Governor of Western Australia and was therefore deemed an "office of profit" under the Crown. Most ministerial by-elections were a formality with the Minister being re-elected unopposed, but on one occasion, in 1901, a Minister from the Council was defeated at the by-elections.

== List of Legislative Council by-elections ==
=== 1950–1989 ===
By-election	Date	Incumbent	Party	Winner	Party	Vacated	Cause	Retained
South-West	24 October 1987	Vic Ferry	Liberal	Barry House	Liberal	24 July 1987	Resignation	Yes
Central	17 November 1984	Gordon Atkinson	Liberal	Eric Charlton	National	4 August 1984	Death	No
North	31 July 1982	Bill Withers	Liberal	Tom Stephens	Labor	21 May 1982	Resignation	No
South Metropolitan	13 March 1982	Howard Olney	Labor	Garry Kelly	Labor	16 December 1981	Resignation	Yes
North	20 February 1971	Harry Strickland	Labor	John Hunt	Labor	31 December 1970	Resignation	Yes
West	21 October 1967	Ray Jones	Country	Fred White	Country	3 September 1967	Death	Yes
Midland	17 August 1963	Charles Simpson	Country	Jack Heitman	Liberal	12 June 1963	Death	No
North-East	29 June 1963	William Hall	Labor	David Dellar	Labor	1 May 1963	Death	Yes
West	29 June 1963	Evan Davies	Labor	Jerry Dolan	Labor	10 April 1963	Death	Yes
West	7 February 1959	Gilbert Fraser	Labor	Ron Thompson	Labor	1 November 1958	Death	Yes
North	22 September 1956	Charles Barker	Labor	Frank Wise	Labor	18 July 1956	Death	Yes
Metropolitan	9 June 1956	Harry Hearn	Liberal	Reg Mattiske	Liberal	20 March 1956	Death	Yes
South-East	10 September 1955	Robert Boylen	Labor	John Cunningham	Liberal	25 June 1955	Death	No
South-West	10 September 1955	Charles Henning	Liberal	F. D. Willmott	Liberal	22 June 1955	Death	Yes
Suburban	20 June 1953	James Dimmitt	Liberal	Arthur Griffith	Liberal	13 April 1953	Resignation (appointed as Agent-General)	Yes
Central	3 May 1952	G. B. Wood	Country	Leslie Diver	Country	3 January 1952	Death	Yes
South-West	2 June 1951	William Mann	Liberal	James Murray	Liberal	22 April 1951	Death	Yes
South-West	2 June 1951	Hobart Tuckey	Liberal	Charles Henning	Liberal	10 March 1951	Death	Yes
Central	6 May 1950	Charles Baxter	Country	Norm Baxter	Country	2 March 1950	Death	Yes

=== 1940–1949 ===
The changes of names of electoral provinces at the 1950 election, effected by the Electoral Districts Act 1947, were as follows:

- Central Province → Midland Province
- East Province → Central Province
- Metropolitan-Suburban Province → Suburban Province
- South Province → South-East Province
- South-East Province → South Province

By-election	Date	Incumbent	Party	Winner	Party	Vacated	Cause	Retained
Metropolitan	8 May 1948	Leonard Bolton	Liberal	Keith Watson	Liberal	31 March 1948	Resignation	Yes
Central	30 August 1947	John Drew	Labor	Harold Daffen	Liberal	17 July 1947	Death	No
West	21 June 1947	William Kitson	Labor	Evan Davies	Labor	15 May 1947	Resignation (appointed as Agent-General)	Yes

== See also ==
- List of Western Australian state by-elections
