= Joseph Cullen =

Australian journalist and politician (1849–1917)

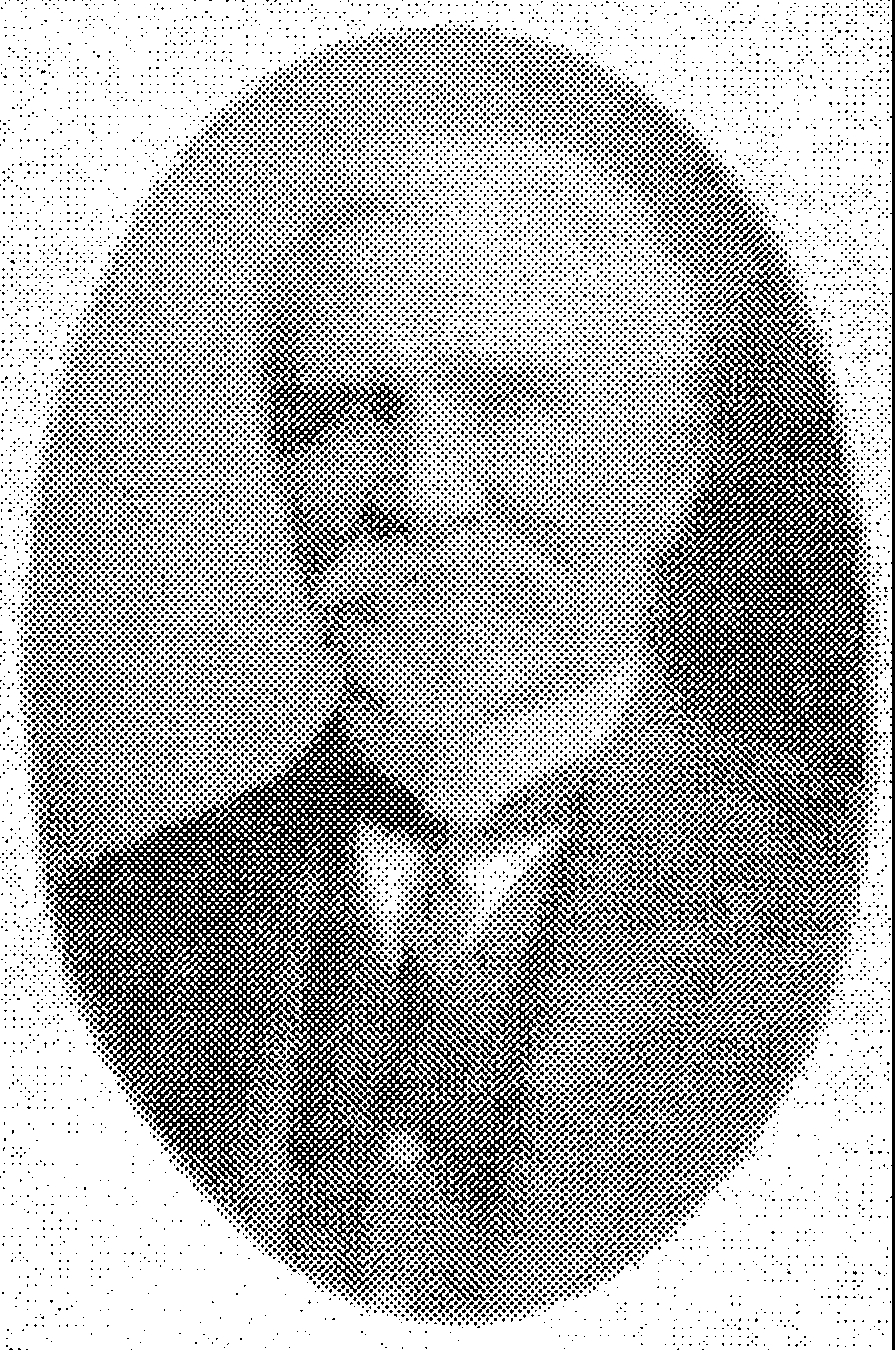

Member of the Western Australian Legislative Council for South-East Province
- In office 1909–1917 Serving with Samuel Haynes, Cuthbert McKenzie, Charles Piesse, George Sewell, and James Greig
- Preceded by: Wesley Maley
- Succeeded by: Hector Stewart

Member of the New South Wales Parliament for Willoughby
- In office 1894
- Preceded by: District established
- Succeeded by: Edward Clark

Member of the New South Wales Parliament for St Leonards
- In office 27 February 1889 – 7 August 1894 Serving with Henry Parkes, John Burns, and Edward Clark
- Succeeded by: Henry Parkes

Personal details
- Born: Joseph Francis Cullen; 1 February 1849 Jamberoo, New South Wales
- Died: 31 March 1917 (aged 68) Katanning, Western Australia, Australia
- Party: Free Trade
- Spouse: Annie Butler (m. 1878)
- Relations: William Portus Cullen (brother)
- Children: 3

Joseph Francis Cullen (1 February 1849 – 31 March 1917) was an Australian journalist and politician, serving as a Member of Parliament in New South Wales and Western Australia.

== Early life ==
Born on 1 February 1849 in Jamberoo, New South Wales around 1849, Joseph Cullen was the son of farmer John Cullen and Rebecca Clinton. His brother William was also a member of the New South Wales parliament and became Chief Justice of New South Wales. Joseph Cullen was educated at state schools before attending Camden College in Sydney.

== Career ==
Cullen became congregational minister for Windsor, North Sydney, North Willoughby and Watsons Bay. He resigned in 1886, and shortly afterwards purchased and edited a North Sydney newspaper.

He was elected to the New South Wales Legislative Assembly on a Free Trade ticket for St Leonards at the 1889 election. He held the seat until the election of 1894, when multi-member districts were abolished. St Leonards was split into three with the new districts being Warringah and Willoughby. Cullen was the Free Trade candidate for Willoughby, winning the election in July 1894. He was forced to resign 4 months later due to insolvency, being made bankrupt on 21 November 1894. He re-contested Willoughby at the resulting by-election however there were 3 free trade candidates and he was defeated by Edward Clark.

In 1904, Cullen emigrated to Western Australia, spending two years on the Eastern Goldfields. Settling at Katanning, he was owner and editor of the Great Southern Herald from 1906. On 4 October 1909, he was elected to the Western Australian Legislative Council in a by-election for the South-East Province. He held the seat until his death.

== Personal life and death ==
On 18 April 1878 he married Annie Butler, with whom he had one son and two daughters.

He died in Katanning on 31 March 1917.

New South Wales Legislative Assembly
Preceded by	Member for St Leonards; 1889 – 1894; With: Henry Parkes; John Burns / Edward Clark	Succeeded by Henry Parkes
New district	Member for Willoughby; 1894	Succeeded by Edward Clark
Western Australian Legislative Council
Preceded by Wesley Maley	Member for South-East Province; 1909 – 1917; With: Samuel Haynes / Cuthbert McKenzie; Charles Piesse / George Sewell / James Greig	Succeeded by Hector Stewart
