= Piesse =

Piesse is a surname. Notable people with the surname include:

- Alfred Piesse (1866–1939), Australian politician
- Arnold Piesse (1872–1935), Australian politician
- Bonnie Piesse (born 1983), Australian actress and musician
- Charles Piesse (1855–1914), Australian politician
- Edmund Piesse (1900–1952), Australian politician
- Frederick Henry Piesse (1853–1912), Australian politician
- Frederick William Piesse (1848–1902), Australian politician
- George William Septimus Piesse (1820–1882), English chemist and perfumer
- Harold Piesse (1884–1944), Australian politician
- Ken Piesse (born 1955), Australian journalist
- Paul Piesse, New Zealand politician
- Winifred Piesse (1923–2017), Australian politician

== See also ==
- Piesse Brook, Western Australia
