= Frederick Allsop =

Australian politician (1865–1932)

The Honourable Frederick Allsop

Member of the Legislative Council of Western Australia
- In office 22 May 1930 – 15 September 1932
- Preceded by: John Brown
- Succeeded by: Richard Moore
- Constituency: North-East Province

Personal details
- Born: 22 September 1865 Auckland, New Zealand
- Died: 15 September 1932 (aged 66) Kalgoorlie, Western Australia, Australia
- Party: Nationalist

Frederick William Allsop (22 September 1865 – 15 September 1932) was an Australian politician who was a Nationalist Party member of the Legislative Council of Western Australia from 1930 until his death, representing North-East Province. Prior to entering politics he worked as a metallurgist.

Allsop was born in Auckland, New Zealand, to Anne (née Jefferies) and William Allsop. His parents moved to Australia when he was an infant and settled in Ballarat, Victoria, where he attended Ballarat High School and the Ballarat School of Mines. In 1893, Allsop moved to South Africa, where he worked as a metallurgical assayer for a Johannesburg-based gold mining firm. He later helped to establish a cyanide plant at Spitzkop (near Lydenburg). Allsop returned to Australia in 1896 and lived in Victoria until 1905, when he moved to Kalgoorlie, Western Australia. He served on the Kalgoorlie Municipal Council from 1921 to 1930, including as mayor from 1922 to 1927. At the 1928 Legislative Council elections, Allsop contested North-East Province as an independent, but was defeated by the sitting Nationalist member, Harold Seddon. He ran again two years later, with the Nationalist Party's endorsement, and won the seat from the Labor Party. However, Allsop's time in parliament was short-lived, as he died in Kalgoorlie in September 1932, aged 66. He had married Florence Hollway in 1896, with whom he had three children.
