= UnionsWA =

Organised labour organisation in Western Australia

- Founded: 1891; 135 years ago
- Headquarters: Level 4, 445 Hay Street Perth WA 6000
- Location: Australia
- Key people: Secretary – Rikki Hendon
- Affiliations: ACTU
- Website: www.unionswa.com.au

UnionsWA is the peak Trades and Labour Council in Western Australia. It represents over 30 affiliated unions, which have over 150,000 members in Western Australia. The organisation is affiliated with the Australian Council of Trade Unions (ACTU). Since the 1980s, the UnionsWA International Committee has acted as the ACTU's representative to the Southern Initiative for Global Trade Union Rights (SIGTUR).

== History ==
=== Early history ===
The Trades & Labor Council, Perth was formed in 1891 and operated as such until 1907 when it re-emerged as the Western Australian Branch of the Australian Labour Federation. Twenty years later, in 1927, it was operating as the Australian Labor Party (WA). It continued in this guise for another twenty years when, in 1947, the name was changed once more, this time to the Trade Unions Industrial Council (ALP, WA) to more accurately delineate its trade union role from the political motives of the labour movement.

=== An independent trades and labour council ===
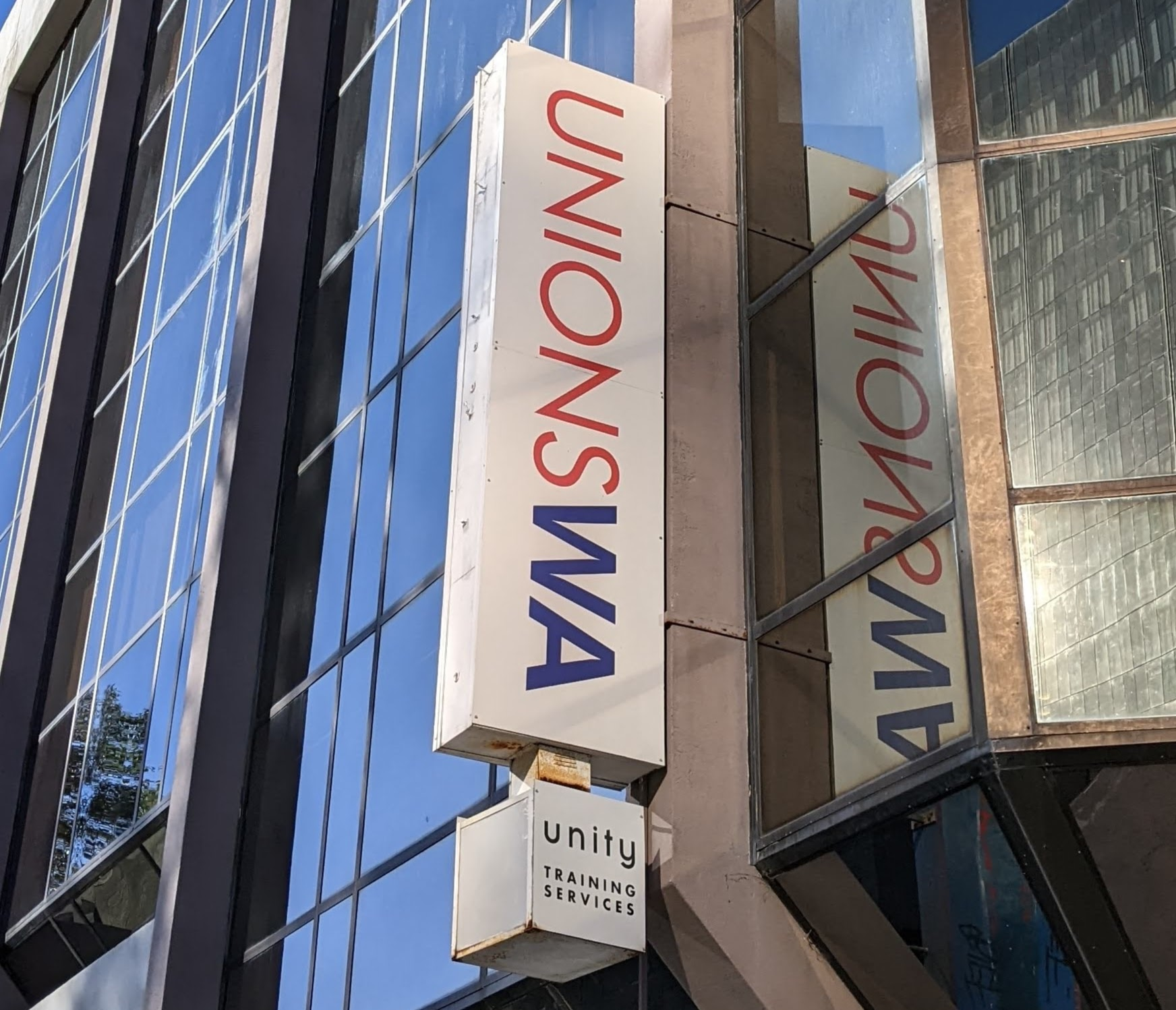
The present day offices of UnionsWA are at 445 Hay Street, Perth

In 1947, six militant unions came together to form the Western Australian Council of Trade Unions (WACTU) as an independent organisation from the Australian Labor Party. The WACTU quickly gained a membership of 33 unions, representing thousands of unionists. The council sought affiliation with the Australian Council of Trade Unions (ACTU). However, during the Twentieth State Labor Congress in the same year, the ALP preempted this move by establishing the Western Australian Trades Unions Industrial Council (WATUIC) as its representative body in the state. ALP State Secretary Joe Chamberlain played a key role in this decision, opposing the creation of an independent Trade and Labour Council.

Chamberlain's objections were primarily political. He was concerned about the growing influence of non-ALP members, especially communists, within the labour movement. Additionally, he recognised that forming a separate industrial body could jeopardise the primary source of party funds, which at that time was the affiliation fees collected from affiliated unions. WATUIC membership was strictly limited to industrial unions affiliated with the ALP and delegates were required to sign the ALP pledge before participating in voting processes.

During the 1950s, there was significant debate among Western Australian unions and the WA branches of federal unions regarding the anomalous situation for the representation of state unions within the Australian Council of Trade Unions (ACTU). The ACTU's Federal Executive faced mounting pressure to address this situation. In 1959, Western Australia's ACTU affiliation was up for renewal. The ACTU Federal Executive hinted that it might withhold re-affiliation unless an independent Trades and Labor Council (TLC) was established as the state's affiliated body.

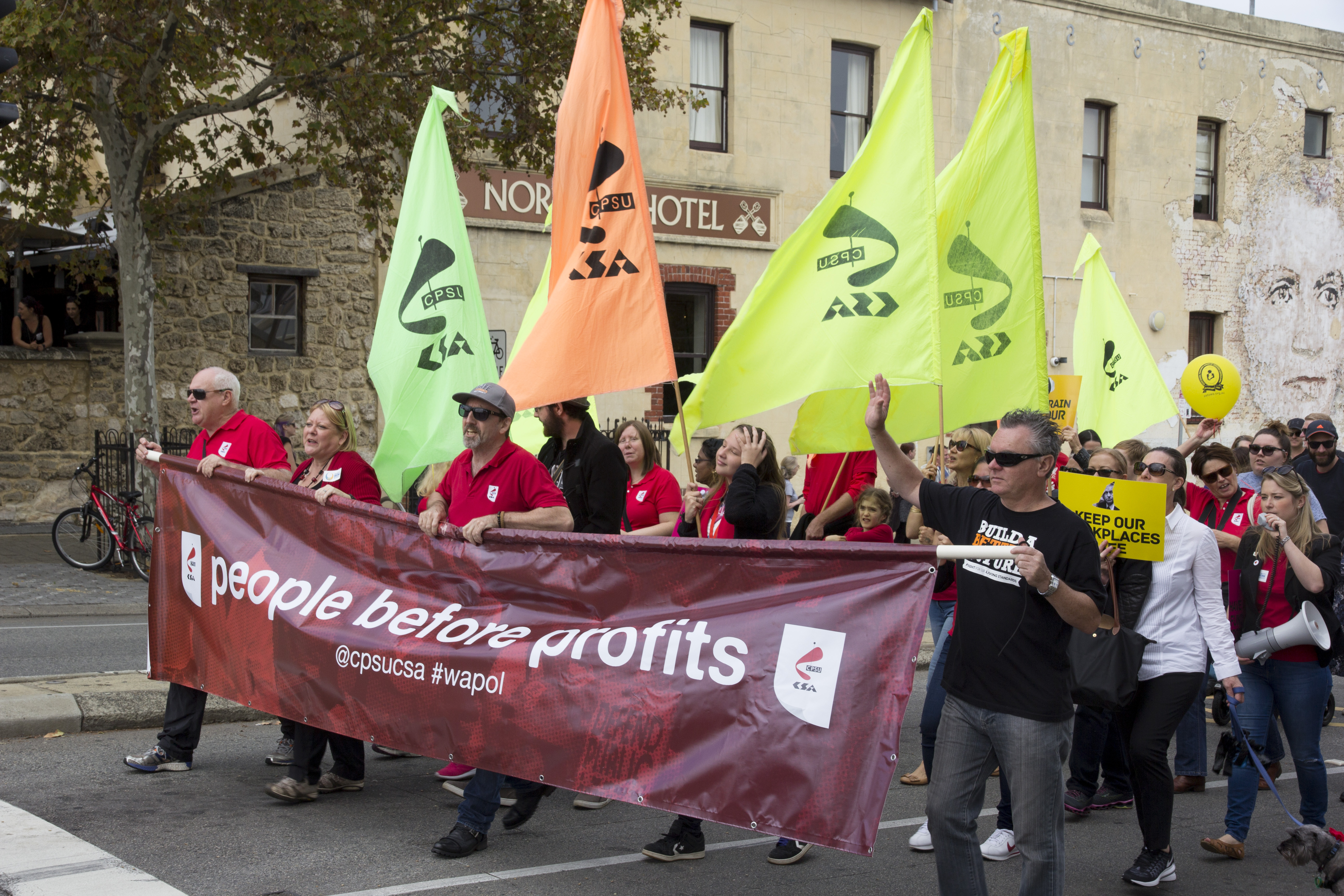
Unions marching through Fremantle as part of the annual UnionsWA May Day Festival.

At the 1959 ACTU Congress, Jim Healy, the General Secretary of the Western Workers' Federation (WWF), proposed that the WA Branch of the ACTU adhere fully to "the democratic principles of affiliation" followed by the ACTU and its other five branches. Healy advocated for making affiliation open to "any bona fide registered trade union or any branch of a Federal Union operating within the State." Jim White, a delegate from the Painters' and Decorators' Union in Western Australia, seconded this motion, which was subsequently approved. The decision was influenced by a letter signed by officials from 12 WA trade unions, expressing support for establishing an independent TLC.

Non-affiliated unions and union representatives who were not ALP members, however, were excluded from a Special Congress of Unions convened in Perth on November 23, 1959. During this congress, a vote was held regarding any structural changes, resulting in 555 against and 206 in favor. However, some critics argued that the officials representing the 27,000 members were "a small group of people who never consulted their membership."

In February 1960, the TLC Campaign Committee, comprising 16 unions with a combined membership of over 32,000 workers, was formed to implement the decision made by the ACTU Congress. The committee's manifesto emphasised that every bona fide trade union or branch of a federal union had an inalienable right to membership in a State TLC and the ability to join the ACTU.

In 1961, a Special Affiliated Union Conference passed a motion for the Special General Council to establish a committee. This committee would examine the process of setting up a separate industrial organization. The goal was to structure this organisation to meet the ACTU's requirements, ensuring that each affiliated union could be represented on the Industrial Council without any political restrictions, as decided in accordance with its rules.

The first federally affiliated independent Western Australian Trades and Labor Council met in Perth Trades Hall in 1963, with the now more politically open Executive Committee including the prominent communist Paddy Troy as Trustee.

=== General strike ===
In November 1963, the newly formed Trades & Labor Council of Western Australia led the state's first general strike. The strike was called in response to industrial relations legislation being introduced by the WA Liberal Government of David Brand, which sought to restrict the power of trade unions, and replace the Court of Arbitration with the Western Australian Industrial Commission and the Western Australian Industrial Appeal Court. The strike was ultimately unable to prevent the passage of the legislation, though it cemented the leadership of the TLC within the union movement.

=== Noonkanbah dispute ===
In 1979, the WA Liberal Government of Charles Court approved exploratory drilling by American oil company Amax at Noonkanbah station, even though it was located on the sacred sites of the Yungngora community. Aboriginal workers and the community opposed the exploration, and in May 1979 Dicky Skinner, a representative of the Noonkanbah workers, spoke to one hundred delegates of the Trades & Labor Council who passed a solidarity motion for the traditional owners. On 25 March 1980, the Trades & Labor Council and the ACTU placed bans on the transport and operation of the drilling rig at Noonkanbah. The Transport Workers Union and the Australian Workers' Union refused to transport or work on the rig. The Court Government was insistent that the drilling occur and organised a 50-truck convoy of non-union workers to travel to the site with a police convoy in August 1980. Police broke up the blockade and forcibly removed and arrested protestors. By November 1980, Amax realised there was no oil on the site.

=== Third-wave dispute ===
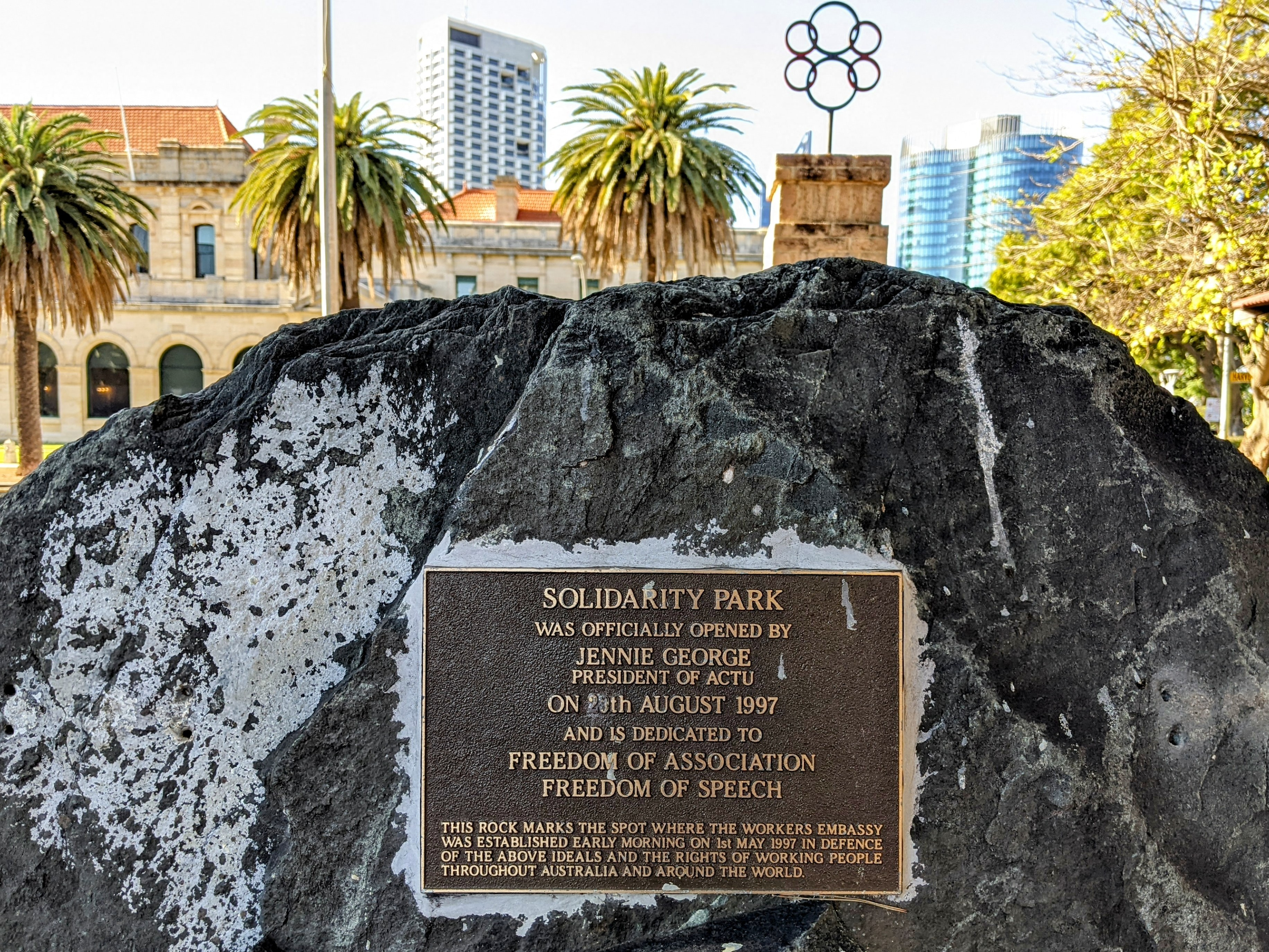
The Commemorative Rock at Solidarity Park marking the spot where the Workers Embassy was established.

In 1997, the Court Liberal Government's introduced a series of reforms aimed at reshaping Western Australia's industrial relations landscape, including a shift towards individual workplace agreements and a reduction in union influence. On 29 April 1997, the Trades & Labor Council under the leadership of Tony Cooke, organised an estimated 30,000 people to march through the city to the State Parliament House in protest.

The Workers Embassy, in the form of a caravan, was set up on the grounds of Parliament House during the protest. Following the arrest of four union officials for remaining on the premises, the Workers Embassy was relocated to a site across the street. Unions occupied the site for 24 hours a day over 6 months.

In a last-ditched attempt to stop the legislation passing, on 14 and 15 May 1997, union officials occupied the Legislative Council and set up a picket line. To escape this disruption, proceedings were removed to a committee room and the legislation was passed through both Houses of Parliament.

In July 1997, the Workers Embassy was renamed Solidarity Park.

Though unable to stop the reforms being passed, the third wave industrial relations legislation was subsequently overturned following the election of the Gallop Government in 2001.

=== Renamed to UnionsWA ===
Although still acknowledged today as the Trades & Labor Council of Western Australia, an increasing association with "white collar" unions had, by 2000, deemed this old title no longer be reflective of all affiliated unions. In April 2000, the Trades & Labor Council of Western Australia was renamed UnionsWA to more adequately encompass both white and blue collar unions. This renaming coincided with the opening of "Unity House" on 1 May, 2000.

== Structure ==
UnionsWA is the state's peak union body representing over 30 affiliated unions and their members. Delegates meet monthly to consider issues affecting the working conditions of Western Australians and determine strategies to improve them. The offices of UnionsWA are located at Level 4, 445 Hay Street, Perth. UnionsWA is the supreme governing body of the trade union movement in Western Australia.

The present office holders are:

- Secretary: Rikki Hendon
- Assistant Secretary: Kari Pnacek
- President: Steve McCartney (Australian Manufacturing Workers Union)
- Senior Vice-President: Carolyn Smith (United Workers Union)

== Solidarity Park ==
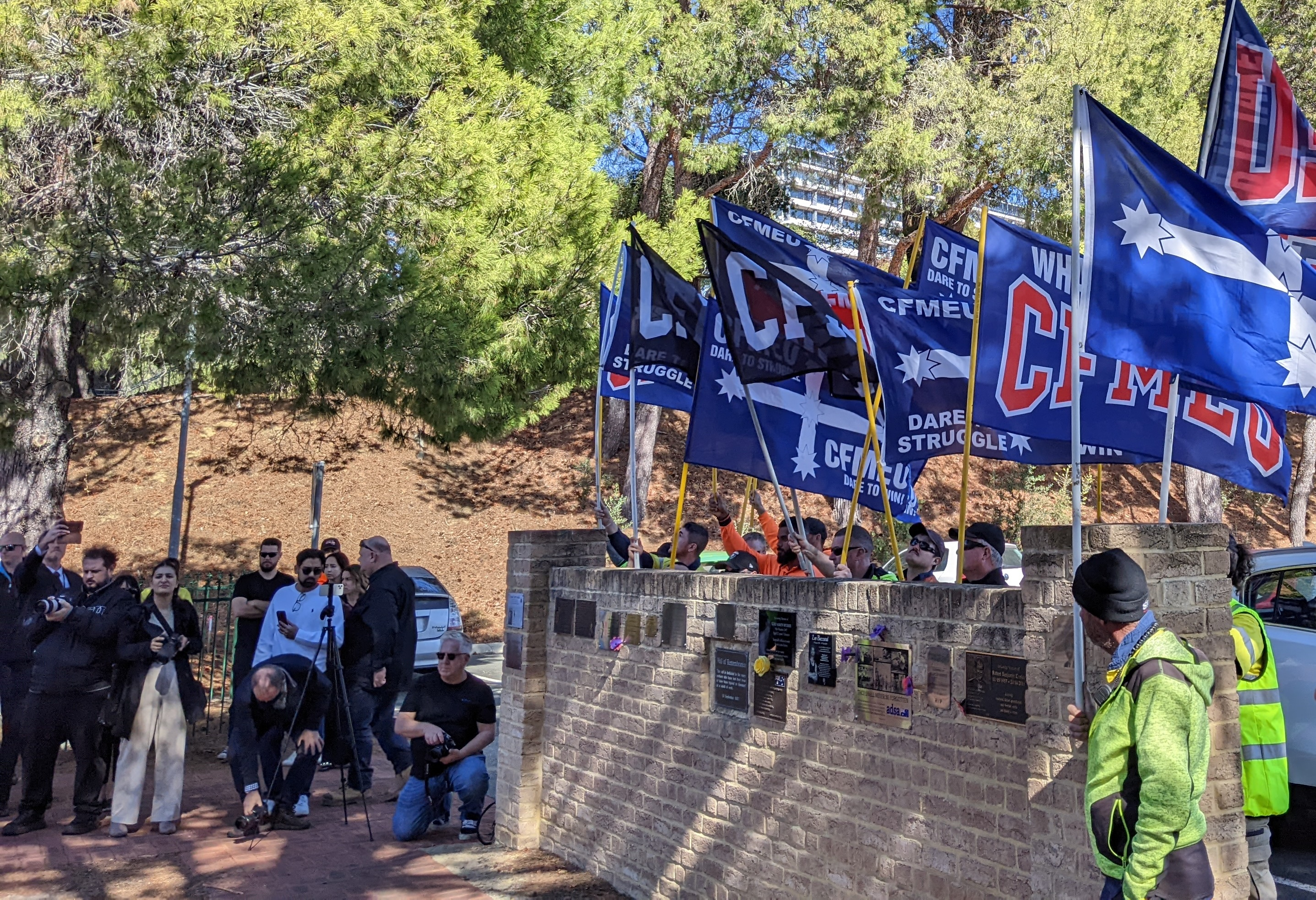
International Workers Memorial Day service at Solidarity Park

UnionsWA is responsible for the use, upkeep, and maintenance of Solidarity Park, opposite Parliament House in Perth, Western Australia.

Solidarity Park contains the largest concentration of labour monuments in Western Australia. The Wall of Remembrance at the park commemorates all killed and injured workers. The Mark Allen Memorial, named in honour of a young CFMEU organiser who was killed on a building site while attempting to get workers down from an unsafe roof, features a triple 8 to symbolise the labour movement's historic struggle for the 8-hour day. The People's Wall that surrounds the park replaced the original sandbag wall around the occupation site, along with other structures such as the Fountain for Youth and the Commemorative Rock.

The International Workers' Memorial Day WA service is held by UnionsWA every year in April at Solidarity Park.

== See also ==
- Australian labour movement
- Perth Trades Hall
- Australian Council of Trade Unions
