= Ration truck massacre =

Execution of Australian POWs during Battle of Timor

- Part of the Battle of Timor
- Location: Dili, Portuguese Timor
- Date: 20 February 1942
- Target: Australian Army
- Attack type: Shooting and stabbing
- Deaths: 17: (3 at the Dili Airfield; 3 along the Comoro River; 11 in Dili)
- Injuries: 3
- Perpetrator: Imperial Japanese Army

The Ration truck massacre or the 1942 Dili massacre refers to the execution of 14 Australian soldiers and the killing of three others on 20 February 1942 in Portuguese Timor, during the Japanese invasion of Timor.

== Massacre ==
In the early hours of 20 February 1942 around 1,500 Japanese soldiers attacked the 18 Australians stationed at the Dili Airfield, during the attack Fred Smith mortally wounded by a grenade, Bryant Gannon was also killed by a grenade while Merv Ryan was wounded and captured over 8 hours later. The same day Reg Alexander was captured as he rode a motorcycle near the airfield and was subsequently executed. At least 200 Japanese were killed.

Later that day 16 Australian soldiers who were driving a ration truck to Dili were ambushed by Japanese soldiers, all 16 were captured and were forced to continue to Dili, four of them were forced to follow the truck on foot. While they were near the Comoro River, Dutch soldiers spotted the Japanese and engaged unaware of the captured Australians. The Japanese were able to repel the Dutch attack. Then shot and bayoneted the four men on foot. Keith Hayes survived and was rescued by two East Timorese boys and their mother Berta Sandanah Martines. The family would hide him in their home for several days before sneaking him to Australian forces. After the 12 men arrived in the Dili, they were taken to the shed of a church near the airfield, the Japanese soldiers decided to execute all but one of the soldiers. The Japanese took the prisoners to the side of the road where they were shot and or beheaded with a sword. At least six of the bodies were burnt. The burned bodies were then buried in a shallow grave on the side of the road. The only soldier that wasn't executed was Pvt. Peter Alexander, He was kept alive for interrogation.

=== Victims ===
Killed at the Comoro River and Dili:

1. LSgt. Gordon Albert Chiswell (born 22 September 1922)
2. Pvt. Francis Joseph “Frank” Alford (born 16 May 1920)
3. Pvt. Harvey William Marriott (born 5 February 1907)
4. Pvt. Donald Hylton “Don” Airey (born 10 July 1920)
5. SSgt. John William Ernest “Jack” Walker (10 September 1919)
6. Pvt. Frederick Thomas “Dick” Crowder (born 30 December 1916)
7. Pvt. Charles Lenard “Charlie” Stanton (born 4 August 1919)
8. Cpl. John Frederick “Jack” Simpson (born 10 May 1905)
9. Pvt. Reginald Herbert “Reg” Murray (1 November 1918)
10. Pvt. Anthony John “Tony” Lane (13 April 1920)
11. Pvt. James “Jim” Pollard (7 July 1919)
12. Pvt. Kenneth Tasman “Ken” Hogg (20 September 1919)
13. Pvt. Henry James “Harry” Cotsworth (5 January 1918)
14. Pvt. Robert Stanley Raymond “Bob” Chalmers (16 April 1919)

Injured at the Comoro River and Dili:

1. Pvt. Keith Mortimer Hayes (born 15 January 1921)
2. Pvt. Peter Alexander (born 2 April 1918)

Killed at the Dili Airfield:

1. Pvt. Bryant Illong Gannon (born 15 July 1912)
2. Pvt. Frederick George "Fred" Smith (born 17 July 1922)
3. Pvt. Reginald Gordon “Reg” Alexander (born 20 September 1917)

Injured at the Dili Airfield:

1. Pvt. Mervyn Peter “Merv” Ryan (born 8 June 1919)
