= Henry Lukin (politician) =

Australian politician

The Honourable Henry Lukin

Member of the Legislative Council of Western Australia
- In office 18 July 1899 – 24 September 1901
- Preceded by: John Taylor
- Succeeded by: Frederick Crowder
- Constituency: East Province

Personal details
- Born: 7 June 1847 Toodyay, Western Australia, Australia
- Died: 24 September 1901 (aged 54) Beverley, Western Australia, Australia

Henry Harbottle Lukin (7 June 1847 – 24 September 1901) was an Australian farmer and politician who was a member of the Legislative Council of Western Australia from 1899 until his death, representing East Province.

Lukin was born in Toodyay, Western Australia, to Jane Sarah (née Cruikshank) and Lionel Lukin. He farmed for a while in the Toodyay district and then went to Beverley, serving on the Beverley Road Board in 1876. In 1888, Lukin went into partnership with his cousin Charles Harper. He also had interests in various properties in the Kimberley. Lukin first stood for parliament at the 1894 Legislative Council elections (the first to be held since the advent of responsible government in 1890), but was defeated. He had success on his second attempt, winning the 1899 by-election occasioned by the resignation of John Howard Taylor. Lukin served in parliament until his death in Beverley in September 1901, aged 54. He had contracted measles, and died from complications.
