= James Griffiths (Australian politician) =

Australian trade unionist and politician

Member of the Legislative Council of Western Australia
- In office 22 May – 21 June 1916
- Preceded by: Robert McKenzie
- Succeeded by: James Cunningham
- Constituency: North-East Province

Personal details
- Born: 26 June 1872 Kangaroo Flat, Victoria, Australia
- Died: 21 June 1916 (aged 43) Boulder, Western Australia, Australia
- Party: Labor

James Bailie Griffiths (26 June 1872 – 21 June 1916) was an Australian trade unionist and Labor Party politician. He was elected to the Legislative Council of Western Australia in May 1916, representing North-East Province, but died after less than a month in office.

Griffiths was born in Kangaroo Flat, Victoria, to Rebecca (née Watts) and James Griffiths. He came to Western Australia in 1895, during the gold rush, and subsequently worked as a prospector in the Mount Margaret district. Griffith had a long involvement with the Miners' Union, at various points serving as a branch secretary in Mount Margaret, Murrin Murrin, and Gwalia. He first ran for parliament at the 1911 election, but lost a Labor preselection ballot to George Foley in the seat of Mount Leonora. He also contested Labor preselection for North-East Province in 1912 and 1914, losing to Dick Ardagh and Harry Millington, respectively. Griffiths was eventually preselected for North-East Province in 1916, and was elected with a large majority. He had suffered from heart trouble for some time, and died in Boulder less than a month after his term began, without ever taking his seat. Griffiths had married Elizabeth Evelyn Lalor in 1912, with whom he had one daughter.
