= Andrew Henning =

Lawyer and politician in Western Australia

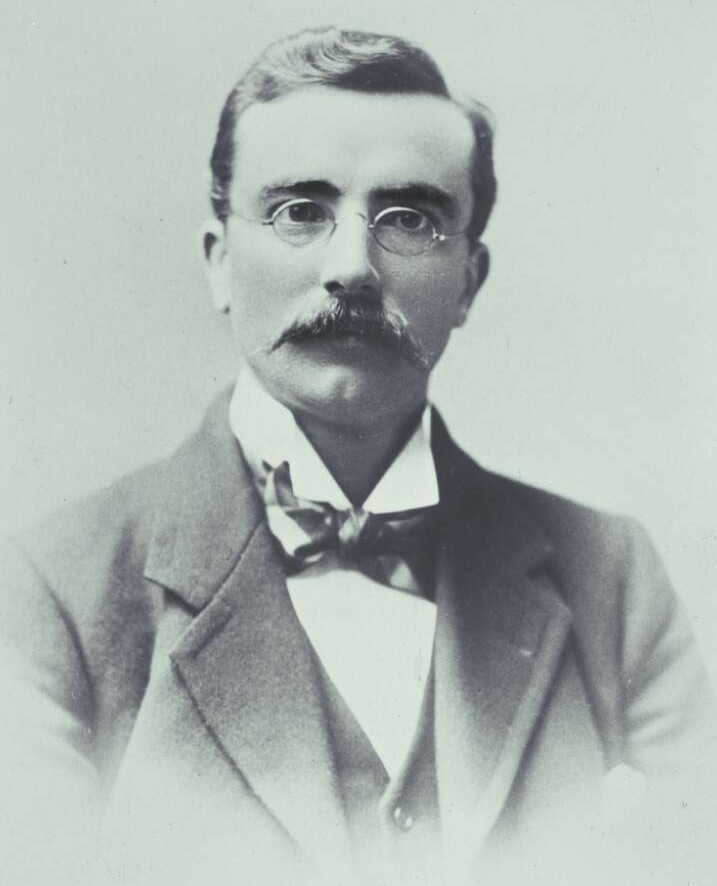
Andrew Henning at the 1898 Australasian Federal Convention.

Andrew Harriot Henning LLB (17 May 1865 (Note: His date of birth is given as 17 May 1865, 15 May 1865, and 1863.) – 2 December 1947) was a lawyer and politician in Western Australia.

== History ==
Andrew Henning was born in North Adelaide, South Australia, a son of Rudolph Wilhelm Emil Henning (died 1884) MHA and Young Catherine Henning née Harriot (died 1925) who married in 1860. Rudolph was a member of a large emigrant from Germany that arrived in South Australia aboard Pauline in December 1849.

Henning was a prize-winning student at Adelaide Educational Institution and Prince Alfred College, then studied law at the University of Adelaide, graduating LLB in 1887. He practised as a barrister and solicitor at Broken Hill and in 1894 moved to Western Australia to practise in Coolgardie, where he helped found the Coolgardie Chamber of Mines. In 1896 he moved to Perth, where he practised as a solicitor until 1907, when he retired.

He was a member for the North-East Province in the Legislative Council from June 1897 to May 1898. He was a Western Australian representatives at the Federal Convention.

He purchased a property at Yalup Brook, where he grew fruit and bred Shropshire sheep, his wool winning a medallion for at the Exhibition in Roubaix, France, in 1911. He was a member of the Perth Club.

He was chairman of the Drakesbrook Road Board for five years.

He retired to Cotherstone Road, Kalamunda in 1927, and that same year he was a guest of the Federal Government at the opening of Parliament House, Canberra in appreciation of his work at the Federal Convention.

He died in the Mount Hospital, St. George's Terrace.

== Family ==
Henning married Nellie Stewart (died 18 June 1913), granddaughter of SA politician James Stewart on 11 June 1896. His wife and her mother died at Payneham, South Australia within two days of each other. Their only surviving son, Charles Harriot Henning, was a military officer who also eventually became a member of parliament. He married again on 28 March 1946 to Frances Rosa Robley née Marchment (1889–1970).
