= Rudolph Henning =

Australian politician

Rudoph Henning
- Born: Rudolph Wilhelm Emil Henning c. 1834
- Died: 24 November 1884 (aged 51)

member of the South Australian House of Assembly for Albert
- In office April 1878 – 1884 Serving with Arthur Hardy
- Preceded by: William Wigley
- Succeeded by: Andrew Handyside

Rudolph Wilhelm Emil Henning (c. 1834 – 24 November 1884) was a businessman and politician of German origin in the early days of the British colony of South Australia.

== History ==
Henning came to Adelaide, South Australia aboard Pauline from Germany in December 1849, with his father, mother and their nine children, including himself. For fifteen years he worked in his father's furniture and mattress factory in Morphett Street, then continued the business on his own account for about four years in Rundle Street. Subsequently he was landlord of the Globe Hotel for five years. Afterwards he purchased, in partnership with R. D. Ross and John Baker, the Angipena, Motpena, and Artemar stations, in the north. They sold these runs, on 21 September 1883, to John Whyte (c. 1826 – 16 February 1902), of Whyte, Counsell, & Co. In February 1881 he became a partner in a firm which became Henning, Bruce, & Aldridge.

He was elected to the House of Assembly in April 1878 for the seat of Albert, and was twice re-elected. He was a somewhat prominent in the House, taking great pains in the preparation of his speeches, but was generally criticised as holding pessimistic views regarding the future of the colony.

His health started to deteriorate in early 1883 and for a considerable time was unable to leave his home on East Terrace, where he died on 24 November 1884 (aged 51).

== Family ==
He married Young Catherine Harriot (c. 1841 – 22 June 1925) on 14 August 1860. Among their five sons and three daughters were:

- Andrew Harriot Henning LLB (15 May 1865 – 2 December 1947), a lawyer and politician in Western Australia
