= Perth Trades Hall =

Historic building in Perth, Western Australia

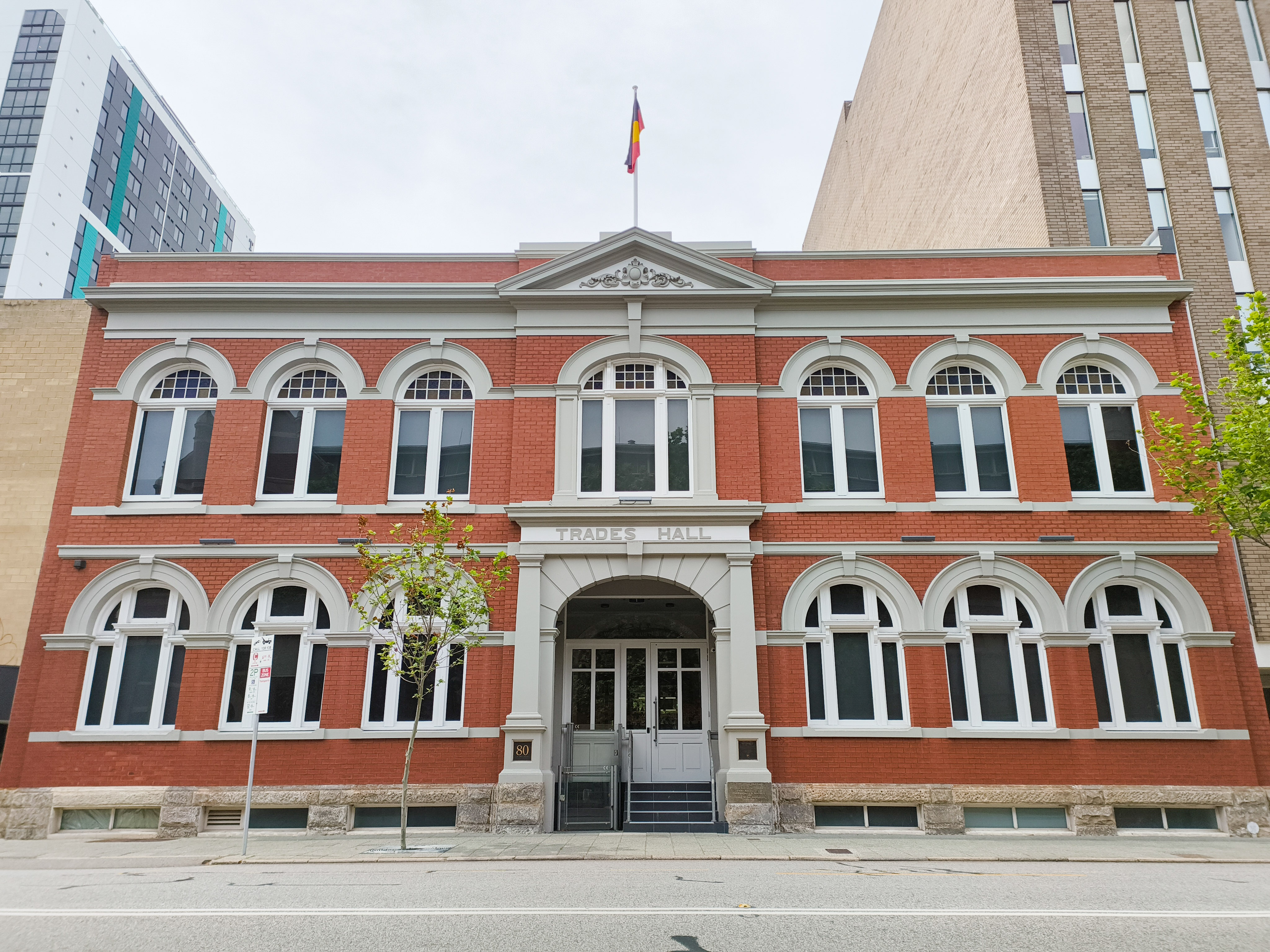
- Perth Trades Hall building in 2024

General information
- Type: Heritage listed building
- Location: Perth, Western Australia
- Coordinates: 31.949780°S 115.862720°E

Western Australia Heritage Register
- Type: State Registered Place
- Designated: 30 July 2004
- Reference no.: 8783

The Perth Trades Hall is a historic trades hall building in Perth, Western Australia that has been occupied by various organisations of the Western Australian trade union movement. The building is now the Western Australian headquarters of the Construction, Forestry, Maritime, Mining and Energy Union (CFMEU).

== Building history ==
Although the Trades and Labour Council (TLC) was established in Perth in 1891, finances to build a trades hall were not available until 1911, when Alick McCallum became general secretary of the Australian Labour Federation, as the TLC was then called.

Design and construction of the original trades hall building was largely due to the efforts of Ernest Henshaw. The three-storey neo-Georgian building was erected at 80 Beaufort Street, the site of Perth's original Scotch College.

The foundation stone was laid by Prime Minister Andrew Fisher on 8 August 1911. The hall was officially opened on 20 April 1912 by John Scaddan, who was the premier of Western Australia and a former trades hall secretary.

In 1985 the building was sold and became the Delaney Gallery. The Heritage Council of Western Australia has listed it as Heritage Place No. 8783: Delaney Gallery (Trades Hall). A 2010 photograph in the register shows that the name Trades Hall has been reinstated above the portico.

A new "Perth Trades Hall", at Unity House, 77–79 Stirling Street, was opened on May Day 2000. It provided offices and meeting rooms for trade unions, the Australian Labor Party and other community and political groups. The TLC, now known as UnionsWA, relocated in 2007 to the CSA Building at 445 Hay Street, Perth. The Western Australian Labor Party relocated to new headquarters on 54 Cheriton Street, Perth, alongside United Voice.

In 2013 the building was purchased by CFMEU so that the building would once again be used for its intended purpose of trade union business. A significant renovation process was undertaken by union workers restoring the building as far as possible to its original condition, with modern facilities provided for staff. On 29 June 2014 the building was re-opened by Michael O'Connor, the national secretary of the combined CFMEU national divisions. At the official reopening he unveiled a plaque bearing the inscription "Back in the hands of those who built it". The building now not only houses the CFMEU, but is regularly used by like-minded organisations as a meeting venue.

Plaque on the front of Trades Hall in Perth
