= Wesley Maley =

Australian politician

The Honourable Wesley Maley

Member of the Legislative Council of Western Australia
- In office 22 May 1900 – 7 September 1909
- Preceded by: Frederick Crowder
- Succeeded by: Joseph Cullen
- Constituency: South-East Province

Personal details
- Born: 5 July 1857 Adelaide, Colony of South Australia
- Died: 7 May 1926 (aged 68) Perth, Western Australia, Australia

Wesley Maley (5 July 1857 – 7 May 1926) was an Australian politician who served as a member of the Legislative Council of Western Australia from 1900 to 1909, representing South-East Province.

Maley was born in Adelaide, Colony of South Australia, and attended North Adelaide Grammar School and Prince Alfred College. He moved to Western Australia in 1882, living first in Fremantle and then in Albany, and in 1883 was elected to the Albany Municipal Council. He later served as chairman of the Katanning Road Board. After 1889, Maley divided his time between Perth, where he was a sharebroker, and his farm at Moojebing (in the Great Southern). He first ran for parliament at the 1894 general election, contesting the Legislative Assembly, but was defeated by Frederick Henry Piesse in the seat of Williams.

In 1900, Maley was elected to the Legislative Council, defeating Frederick Crowder in South-East Province. He was re-elected to a second six-year term in 1906, but resigned his seat in September 1909 in order to contest the 1909 Albany by-election. Running as a Ministerialist (a supporter of the government of Newton Moore), Maley was defeated by the Labor Party's candidate, William Price. After leaving parliament, he eventually retired to Perth, dying there in May 1926 (aged 68). Maley had married Caroline Bellingham in 1879, with whom he had three sons and two daughters. His brother-in-law, George Bellingham, was also a member of parliament.
