= Solidarity Park =

Landscaped park in Perth, Western Australia

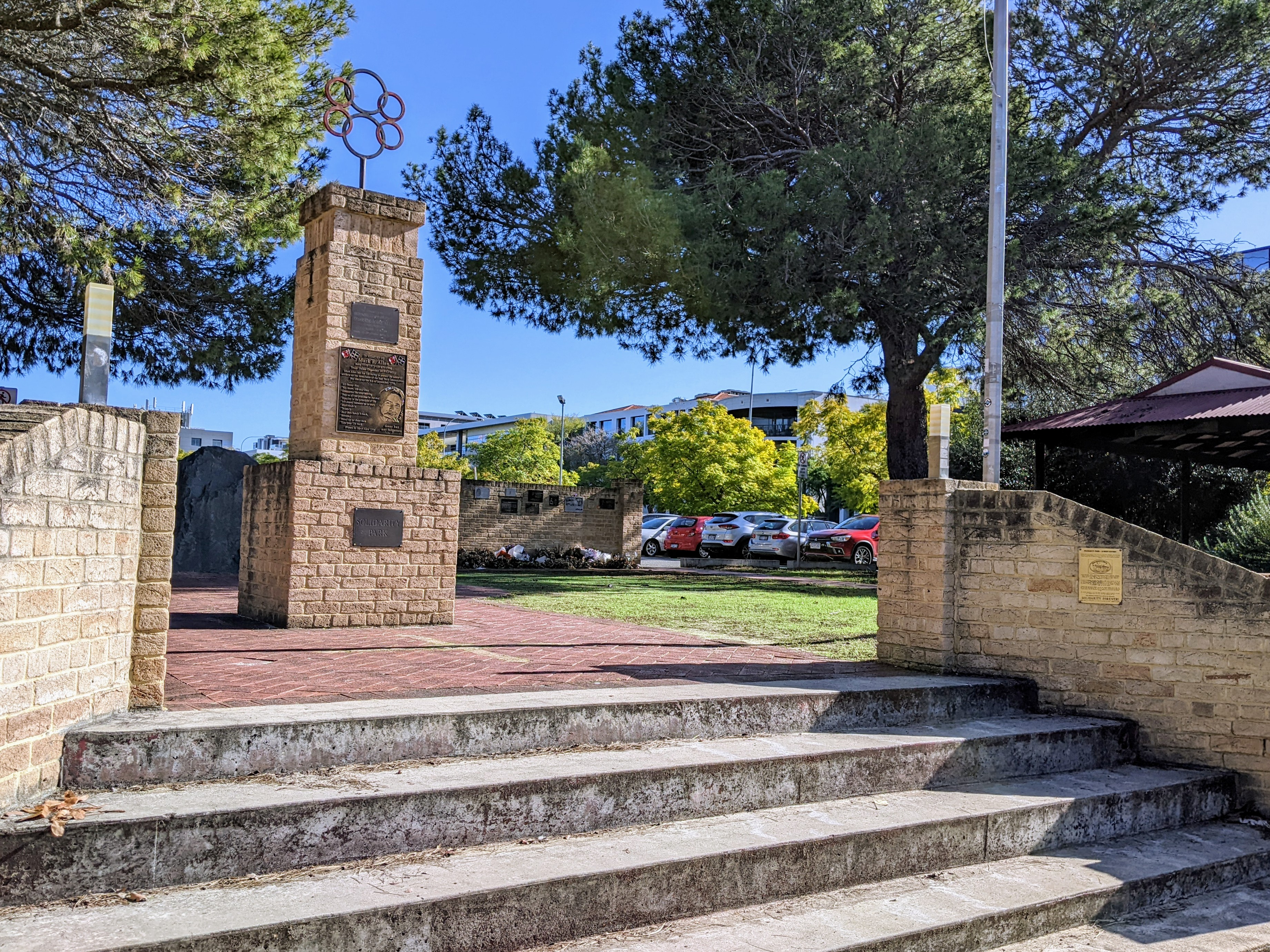

- Location within Perth
- Solidarity Park (●) is located opposite Parliament House in Perth, Western Australia
- Location: Perth, Western Australia
- Coordinates: 31.951686°S 115.846213°E
- Opened: 1997; 29 years ago
- Manager: UnionsWA
- Website: www.unionswa.com.au/about-us/solidarity-park-memorial-day/

Western Australia Heritage Register
- Type: State Registered Place
- Designated: 20 Apr 2004
- Reference no.: 15850

Solidarity Park is located opposite Parliament House in Perth, Western Australia. In 1997, a 'workers embassy' was set up on vacant land opposite Parliament House during union protests of the Court Government's 'third wave' legislation for industrial relations. A landscaped shelter with a monument to trade union workers who have died during their work was established at the park. The monument was particularly dedicated to Mark Allen, a young CFMEU organiser who was killed on a building site while attempting to get workers down from an unsafe roof.

== History ==
The workers embassy, in the form of a caravan, was first established on the grounds of Parliament House on 29 April 1997 as part of the campaign against the 'third wave' industrial relations legislation, when an estimated 30,000 people marched through the city to Parliament House. Three unionists had parked the caravan to act as a distribution point for information and a collection point for donations during and after the rally. When approached by security, they claimed it to be a first aid post and were able to leave it in place.

Four union officials were subsequently arrested on the night of the 30 April for remaining on the premises, with the workers embassy relocated to a site across the street from Parliament House. On 1 May 1997, Mike Mitchell, an organiser from the Communications, Electrical, Electronic, Energy, Information, Postal, Plumbing, and Allied Services Union (CEPU), marked out the 510-square-metre (5,500 sq ft) site under the Mining Act using a prospector's license.

Unions occupied the site 24 hours a day for six months. In July 1997, the workers embassy was renamed Solidarity Park. In July and August, multiple structures were established on the site including the Mark Allen Memorial, which features a triple-8 symbol to represent the labour movement's historic struggle for the 8-hour day, the People's Wall to replace the original sandbag wall around the site, the Fountain for Youth, and the Commemorative Rock. As a result, Solidarity Park is the location of the highest concentration of labour monuments in Western Australia.

The 'third wave' industrial relations legislation was overturned following the election of the Gallop Government in 2001, and Solidarity Park was permanently listed on the State Register of Heritage Places in 2004.

An International Workers Memorial Day event is held at Solidarity Park every year. UnionsWA is currently responsible for the management and maintenance of the site.

== See also ==
- UnionsWA

== General references ==
- Nearly a year and Embassy still stands .W.A. construction worker, Autumn 1998, p. 37, – referring to both the – Solidarity Park (Perth, W.A.) and the Workers' Embassy (Perth, W.A.)
- The Workers Embassy Scrapbook. Papers in labour history, No. 20 (Aug. 1998), entire issue devoted to issue.
