= Richard Moore (Australian politician) =

Australian blacksmith and politician

Sir Richard Moore OBE

Mayor of Kalgoorlie
- In office 1937 – 15 September 1966
- Preceded by: Ernest Brimage
- Succeeded by: Lewis Alman

Member of the Western Australian Parliament for North-East Province
- In office 29 October 1932 – 21 May 1936 Serving with Edgar Harris (1932–1934); Harold Seddon (1932–1936); Charles Elliott (1934–1936)

Personal details
- Born: Richard Greenslade Moore; 21 June 1878 Neereman, Victoria
- Died: 15 September 1966 (aged 88) Kalgoorlie, Western Australia
- Party: Nationalist Party; Liberal Party of Australia
- Education: Eddington State School
- Occupation: Blacksmith

Sir Richard Greenslade Moore OBE (21 June 1878 – 15 September 1966) was an Australian politician who served as Mayor of the Municipality of Kalgoorlie (Town of Kalgoorlie from 1961) between 1937 and 1966. He was a member of the Western Australian Legislative Council between 1932 and 1936.

== Early life ==
Moore was born in 1878 in Neereman, near Bendigo in the Goldfields region of Victoria to Anne (née Greenslade) and John Moore. His father was a blacksmith and Richard took on his father's trade after finishing school.

== Move to Western Australia ==
In 1900, Moore moved to Kalgoorlie where he worked as a gold miner. Two years later, he set up a blacksmith operation at Broad Arrow, north of Kalgoorlie. In the following years, Moore moved between Kalgoorlie, Perth, back to Victoria; finally returning to Kalgoorlie towards the end of the decade.

== Politics ==
In April 1925, Moore was elected to the Kalgoorlie Municipal Council in an extraordinary election. Moore was elected to the Western Australian Legislative Council in 1932 as one of three members of the North-East Province as a member of the Nationalist Party. Moore resigned his council seat in 1933 to focus on his parliamentary responsibilities. In July 1937, Moore was elected as Mayor of Kalgoorlie following the death of the incumbent, Ernest Brimage.

== Honours ==
Moore was made an Officer of the Order of the British Empire (OBE) in January 1951. In 1960, Moore became a Knight Bachelor.
