= Charles Elliott (Australian politician) =

Australian politician (1870–1938)

Charles George Elliott (3 March 1870 – 23 March 1938) was an Australian politician. He was a Nationalist Party member of the Western Australian Legislative Council from 1934 until his death, representing North-East Province.

Elliott was born at Gundaroo, New South Wales, where his parents had a pastoral property, and educated at local schools. He came to Western Australia in 1893. He walked from the then rail-head at Southern Cross to Coolgardie, prospected in various places, mainly at Mount Margaret, and managed several outback mines and batteries. He eventually settled in Kalgoorlie, where he became a prominent tributer (a miner who works mines under an agreement with the owner for a proportion of the proceeds) and mining engineer. He was a councillor of the Municipality of Kalgoorlie from November 1922 to May 1934.

Elliott developed a reputation as an advocate for the interests of tributers. In 1921, he was largely responsible for making the tributers' case at a Royal Commission into the practice which resulted in legislative reforms. In 1931, he co-founded the Eastern Goldfields Tributers Association and became the organisation's secretary, in which capacity, in 1932-33, he was heavily involved in a major legal test case which, after being appealed all the way to the Judicial Committee of the Privy Council, established tributers' right to a half-share in the premium of gold found under tribute arrangements, resulting in substantial financial windfalls for the tributers.

In 1937, he was involved in establishing the Amalgamated Prospectors of Western Australia, serving as its inaugural president until his death the following year, in 1938.

Elliott was elected to the Legislative Council in 1934, comfortably winning a by-election caused by the death of Edgar Harris after three prior failed attempts (one for the National Labor Party and two for the Nationalist Party). He was recognised in parliament as an authority on mining matters. He died in office at St John of God Hospital, Kalgoorlie from pneumonia in 1938 and was buried in the Anglican section of Kalgoorlie Cemetery.

He married Catherine Reid on 7 September 1908; they had one son and two daughters. Catherine was a prominent Kalgoorlie figure in her own right, having been made a Member of the Order of the British Empire (MBE) in 1936 for her community and public health work, and unsuccessfully contested the by-election two years later, caused by his death, as the endorsed Nationalist candidate. She lost to William Hall.
