= William Alexander (Australian politician) =

Australian businessman and politician

The Honourable William Alexander
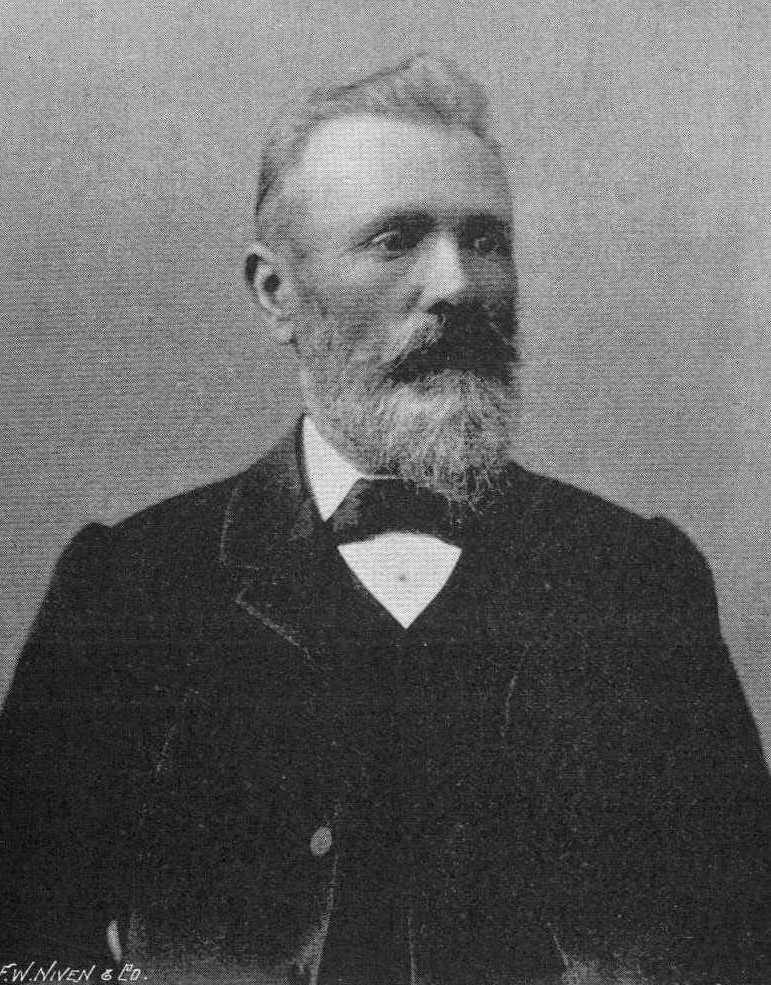

Member of the Legislative Council of Western Australia
- In office 25 July 1895 – 21 May 1898
- Preceded by: Ernest Henty
- Succeeded by: Frederic Whitcombe
- Constituency: Central Province

Personal details
- Born: December 1844 Dunnichen, Forfarshire, Scotland
- Died: 27 May 1924 (aged 79) Brisbane, Queensland, Australia

William Alexander (December 1844 – 27 May 1924) was an Australian businessman and politician who was a member of the Legislative Council of Western Australia from 1895 to 1898.

Alexander was born in Dunnichen, Forfarshire, Scotland. He came to Australia in 1866, and initially lived in Queensland, where he had interests in various mining ventures. In 1873, Alexander set up in Toowoomba as a storekeeper and draper. Having made two previous visits, he moved to Western Australia permanently in 1891, and settled in Geraldton, where he had a store. Alexander was elected to parliament at an 1895 Legislative Council by-election for Central Province, which had been necessitated by the death of Ernest Henty. He served out the remainder of Henty's term, but did not recontest his seat at the 1898 election. After leaving parliament, Alexander ran a drapery in Kalgoorlie until 1903, and thereafter concentrated on his mining investments. He returned to Queensland in 1913, and died there in 1924, aged 79.
