= Anthony Loton =

Australian politician

The Honourable Anthony Loton

9th President of the Legislative Council of Western Australia
- In office 17 June 1954 – 6 August 1958
- Preceded by: Sir Harold Seddon
- Succeeded by: Sir Charles Latham

Member of the Legislative Council of Western Australia
- In office 18 November 1944 – 21 May 1950
- Preceded by: Harold Piesse
- Succeeded by: George Bennetts
- Constituency: South-East Province
- In office 21 May 1950 – 21 May 1965
- Preceded by: George Bennetts
- Succeeded by: Edward House
- Constituency: South Province

Personal details
- Born: Anthony Lloyd Loton; 13 February 1904; Upper Swan, Western Australia
- Died: 14 May 1998 (aged 94); Kalamunda, Western Australia
- Political party: Country

Anthony Lloyd Loton (13 February 1904 – 14 May 1998) was an Australian politician who served as a Country Party member of the Legislative Council of Western Australia from 1944 to 1965. He was President of the Legislative Council from 1954 to 1958.

Loton was born in Upper Swan, Western Australia, to Annie Campbell (née Forrest) and Ernest William Loton. His mother was a niece of Sir John Forrest, the first Premier of Western Australia, and his paternal grandfather, Sir William Loton, was a Mayor of Perth. Loton was educated in Perth, attending Christ Church Grammar School and Hale School. After leaving school, he initially farmed on his father's farm at Upper Swan, but later took over a property in Popanyinning (a small Wheatbelt locality). Prominent in agricultural circles, Loton was elected to parliament at a 1944 by-election for the Legislative Council's South-East Province, which had been caused by the death of Harold Piesse. After the 1947 state election, he was made deputy chairman of committees. In May 1954, the President of the Legislative Council, Sir Harold Seddon, lost his seat, and Loton was elected in his place. The first holder of the office from the Country Party, he served in the position for just over four years, leaving office in August 1958. Loton retired from parliament at the 1965 state election.

Parliament of Western Australia
Preceded by Harold Piesse	Member for South-East Province; 1944-1950	Succeeded by George Bennetts
Preceded by George Bennetts	Member for South Province; 1950-1965	Succeeded by Edward House
Preceded by Sir Harold Seddon	President of the Western Australian Legislative Council; 1954–1958	Succeeded by Sir Charles Latham
