= George Sewell (politician) =

Australian politician

The Honourable George Sewell

Member of the Legislative Council of Western Australia
- In office 18 August 1914 – 8 March 1916
- Preceded by: Charles Piesse
- Succeeded by: James Greig
- Constituency: South-East Province

Personal details
- Born: 6 September 1855 Beverley, Western Australia, Australia
- Died: 8 March 1916 (aged 60) West Pingelly, Western Australia, Australia
- Party: Country

George Malakoff Sewell (6 September 1855 – 8 March 1916) was an Australian farmer and politician who served as a Country Party member of the Legislative Council of Western Australia from 1914 until his death, representing South-East Province.

Sewell was born in Beverley, Western Australia, to Anna (née Parker) and John Sewell. His uncle, Stephen Stanley Parker, and a first cousin, Stephen Henry Parker, were also member of parliaments. After leaving school, Sewell farmed at Pingelly, where he had inherited the property Maplestead from his father. Becoming prominent in agricultural circles, he was elected to the Pingelly Road Board in 1904, and later served as chairman for a period. Sewell entered the Legislative Council in August 1914, at a by-election occasioned by the death of Charles Piesse. He was one of ten candidates to standard for Country Party preselection, but was only opposed by one other candidate in the election itself. Sewell served in parliament until he died of cancer in March 1916, aged 60.
