= Francis Drake Willmott =

Australian politician

The Honourable Francis Drake Willmott

Member of the Legislative Council of Western Australia
- In office 10 September 1955 – 21 May 1974 Serving with Les Craig (1955–1956); James Murray (1955–1965); Graham MacKinnon (1956–1965); Vic Ferry (1965–1974)
- Preceded by: Charles Henning
- Succeeded by: Graham MacKinnon
- Constituency: South-West Province

Personal details
- Born: 23 January 1904 Nannup, Western Australia
- Died: 4 August 2004 (aged 100) Mount Lawley, Western Australia
- Party: Liberal
- Spouse: Edith Frances Riches (m. 1934; died 1970)

Francis Drake Willmott (23 January 1904 – 4 August 2004) was an Australian politician who was a Liberal Party member of the Legislative Council of Western Australia from 1955 to 1974.

Willmott was born in Nannup, a small town in the South West region of Western Australia, to Frances Edith (née Brockman) and Francis Edward Sykes Willmott. His father, uncle (Edmund Vernon Brockman), and first cousin (William Willmott) were all also members of parliament. Willmott was sent to Perth to be educated, boarding at Hale School. He afterward returned to his father's farm near Bridgetown, which he and his brother eventually took over. Willmott was elected to the Bridgetown Road Board in 1941, serving until 1947.

A long-time member of the Liberal Party, Willmott was elected to parliament at a Legislative Council by-election in September 1955, necessitated by the death of Charles Henning. Representing South-West Province, a Liberal stronghold, he was elected unopposed at all subsequent elections. Willmott was appointed deputy chairman of committees after the 1965 state election, serving until his retirement at the 1974 election. He retired to Perth after leaving parliament, where he died in August 2004, aged 100. Willmott had married Edith Frances Riches in 1934, with whom he had two sons and a daughter. His wife was a granddaughter of James Henry Young, who was a state MP in New South Wales.

== See also ==
- List of centenarians (politicians and civil servants)
