= Ernest Henty =

Australian politician

Ernest George Henty (17 September 1862 – 25 June 1895) was a Member of the Western Australian Legislative Council from 1894 to 1895.

Born in Albury, New South Wales on 17 September 1862, Ernest Henty was the son of squatter Richmond Henty, who was either the first or the second white child to be born in the colony of Victoria. The famous Henty brothers, James and Edward, were his great-uncles. As a youth Ernest Henty worked as a clerk for James Henty & Co., spending some years with the firm in Fiji. In 1883 he moved to Melbourne, working as a journalist for the World and then the Melbourne Daily Telegraph. From 1885 to 1890 he was editor of the Upper Murray and Mitta Herald, a Tallangatta newspaper. On 12 June 1890 he married Katherine Mary Harvie Alberta Cobham; they had two sons and a daughter. At the time of his marriage his occupation was given as grazier.

Shortly afterwards, Henty emigrated to Western Australia with his brother-in-law, and the men established themselves as merchants under the name Henty, Cobham & Co. Henty became a wine, spirit and tea agent. In 1891, Henty played several matches for the Rovers Football Club in the West Australian Football Association (WAFA). By 1895, the company had branches in Geraldton, Southern Cross and Coolgardie.

On 16 July 1894, Henry was elected to a Central Province seat in the Western Australian Legislative Council. He held the seat until his death at Coolgardie on 25 June 1895.
