= James Cornell =

Australian politician (1874–1946)

The Honourable James Cornell
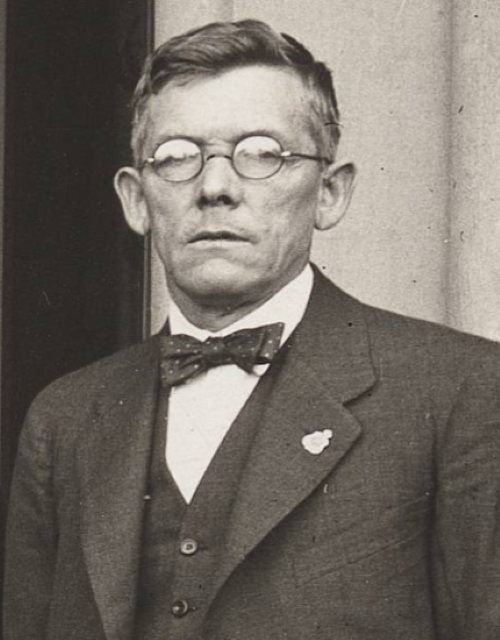
- James Cornell at Government House, 1926

7th President of the Legislative Council of Western Australia
- In office 25 July 1946 – 25 November 1946
- Preceded by: Sir John Kirwan
- Succeeded by: Harold Seddon

Member of the Legislative Council of Western Australia
- In office 22 May 1912 – 25 November 1946
- Preceded by: John Glowrey
- Succeeded by: Robert Boylen
- Constituency: South Province

Personal details
- Born: 23 December 1874 Merrijig, Victoria, Australia
- Died: 25 November 1946 (aged 71) Claremont, Western Australia, Australia
- Party: Labor (to 1917); National Labor (1917–1924); Nationalist (1924–1945); Liberal (from 1945)

James Cornell (23 December 1874 – 25 November 1946) was an Australian politician who served as a member of the Legislative Council of Western Australia from 1912 until his death. He was elected President of the Legislative Council in July 1946, but served just four months before dying in office.

== Early life ==
Cornell was born in Merrijig, Victoria, to Barbara Jane (née Brown) and Henry Cornell. He came to Western Australia in 1897, initially working as a station hand at a lease on the Ashburton River. In 1900, Cornell moved to the Eastern Goldfields, working as a miner, labourer, and iron worker's assistant in Boulder. He became involved with the trade union movement, and eventually became an official of the regional trades and labour council.

== Politics ==
Cornell was elected to the Legislative Council in 1912, representing South Province. He stood as a candidate of the Labor Party, but left the party in early 1917 over the conscription issue. Cornell played a key role in the formation of the state branch of the National Labor Party, which subsequently supported the Nationalist government of Henry Lefroy. In March 1917, he enlisted in the Australian Imperial Force. He was stationed in France, and by the end of the war held the rank of sergeant.

In May 1918, while on active duty, Cornell won re-election to the Legislative Council standing as a National Labor candidate against an endorsed Labor candidate. He was elected president of the National Labor state branch in 1921, and was re-elected to parliament under that banner in 1924, although the final margin was only 18 votes. The party was merged into the Nationalist Party in late 1924, with the new entity initially known as the United Party, although it later returned to the Nationalist name.

In September 1926, Cornell was appointed chairman of the committees in the Legislative Council. He held the position until July 1946, when he was elevated to the presidency of the council in place of Sir John Kirwan. In the meantime, he had been re-elected to parliament three times as a Nationalist, in 1930, 1936, and 1942, and joined the new Liberal Party in 1945. Cornell died in office in November 1946, aged 71, and was granted a state funeral. He had married twice, to Mary Ann Daws in 1909 and to Florence Evelyn Bruce in 1940. His only child was George Cornell, who was also a member of parliament.

== See also ==
- Members of the Western Australian Legislative Council

Parliament of Western Australia
| Preceded by John Glowrey | Member for South Province; 1912-1946 | Succeeded by Robert Boylen |
| Preceded by Sir John Kirwan | President of the Western Australian Legislative Council; 1946 | Succeeded by Harold Seddon |
