= Town of Kalgoorlie =

Former local government area in Western Australia

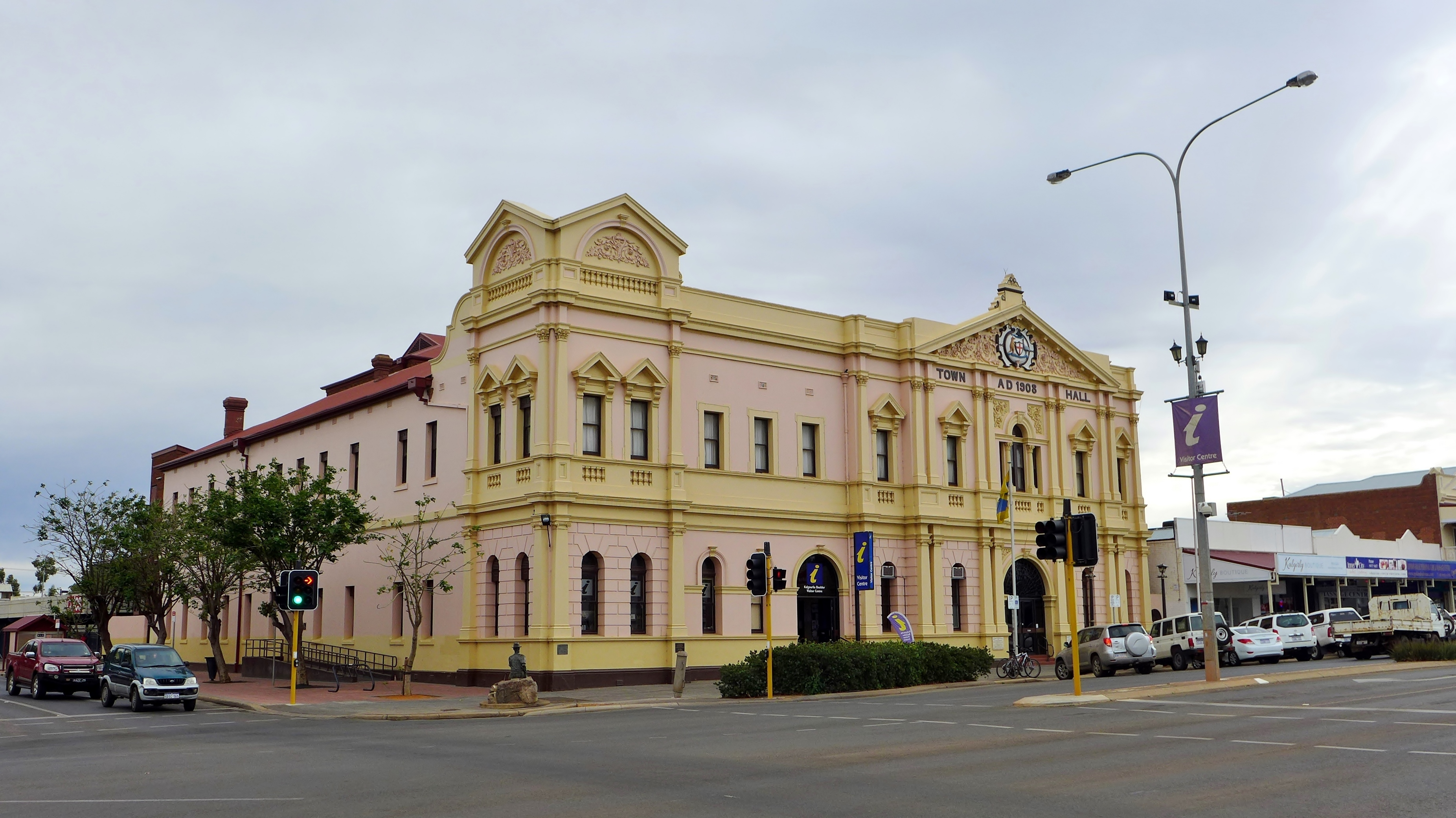
Kalgoorlie Town Hall, the council's former headquarters

The Town of Kalgoorlie was a local government area in Western Australia, centred on the town of Kalgoorlie.

It was established as the Municipality of Kalgoorlie on 15 February 1895. It was renamed the Town of Kalgoorlie on 1 July 1961.

The municipality was responsible for the construction of the Kalgoorlie Town Hall as its new headquarters in 1907-09, which replaced earlier municipal chambers in Brookman Street.

It amalgamated with the Shire of Boulder to form the City of Kalgoorlie-Boulder on 15 April 1989.

== Mayors ==
The following people served as mayors of the Kalgoorlie council:

- John Wilson (1895-1896)
- Harold George Parsons (1896-1897)
- Robert Donald McKenzie (1897–1898)
- John (Jack) William Fimister (1898–1900)
- Miles Staniforth Smith (1900–1901)
- Sir Norbert Michael Keenan (1901–1905)
- John Hurtle Cummins (1905–1907)
- Mark Rosenberg (1907–1909)
- Sidney Edwin Hocking (1909–1911)
- Charles Augustus Cutbush (1911–1914)
- Henry Walter Davidson (1914–1917)
- Bernard Patrick Leslie (1917–1920)
- Henry Walter Davidson (1920-1921)
- William Robert Burton (1921–1922)
- Frederick William Allsop (1922–1927)
- Bernard Patrick Leslie (1927–1933)
- Ernest Elisha Brimage (1933–1937)
- Sir Richard Moore (1937–1966)
- Lewis Arthur Alman (1966–1969)
- Herbert Alexander Hammond (1969–1976)
- Maxwell Raymond Finlayson (1976–1989)

== See also ==
- Town of Boulder § Mayors
