= Robert McKenzie (Australian politician) =

Australian businessman and politician

The Honourable Robert McKenzie
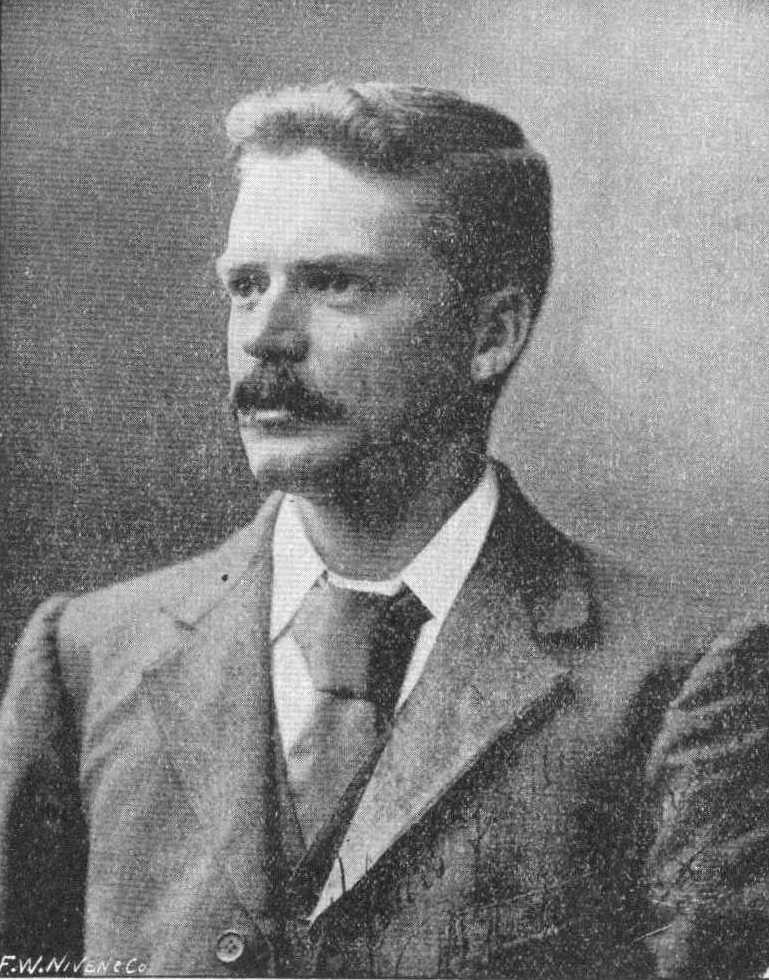

Member of the Legislative Council of Western Australia
- In office 30 May 1904 – 21 May 1916
- Preceded by: Arthur Jenkins
- Succeeded by: James Griffiths
- Constituency: North-East Province

Personal details
- Born: 19 March 1865 Eaglehawk, Victoria, Australia
- Died: 14 May 1928 (aged 63) Swanbourne, Western Australia, Australia

Robert Donald McKenzie (19 March 1865 – 14 May 1928) was an Australian businessman and politician who was a member of the Legislative Council of Western Australia from 1904 to 1916. He was a minister in the first government of Frank Wilson.

McKenzie was born in Eaglehawk, Victoria (near Bendigo), to Margaret (née Reid) and Hugh McKenzie. He came to Western Australia in 1894, during the gold rush, and opened a general store at Hannans (near Kalgoorlie). McKenzie later expanded his business, becoming a timber and hardware merchant. He was elected to the Kalgoorlie Municipal Council in 1895, and would serve as Mayor of Kalgoorlie from 1897 to 1898. McKenzie was elected to parliament at the 1904 Legislative Council elections, defeating Arthur Jenkins in North-East Province. He was re-elected in May 1910, and when Frank Wilson replaced Newton Moore as premier a few months later he was made a minister without portfolio in the new ministry. Wilson's government was defeated in October 1911, and McKenzie left parliament when his term expired in 1916. He died in Perth in 1928, aged 63.
