= Hobart Tuckey =

Australian politician (1884–1951)

The Honourable Hobart Tuckey

Member of the Legislative Council of Western Australia
- In office 22 May 1934 – 10 March 1951
- Preceded by: Edwin Rose
- Succeeded by: Charles Henning
- Constituency: South-West Province

Personal details
- Born: 27 April 1884 Mandurah, Western Australia, Australia
- Died: 10 March 1951 (aged 66) Subiaco, Western Australia, Australia
- Party: Nationalist (to 1945); Liberal (from 1945)
- Spouse: Mildred Edith Green (m.1916–1951; his death)

Hobart Tuckey (27 April 1884 – 10 March 1951) was an Australian politician who was a member of the Legislative Council of Western Australia from 1934 until his death, representing South-West Province.

Tuckey was born in Mandurah, Western Australia, to Emma (née Bell) and Charles Tuckey. After leaving school, he worked as a telegraphist in Fremantle for a period, and then served as postmaster in Narrogin and Wagin (two rural centres). Tuckey eventually returned to Mandurah, where he was variously a storekeeper, commercial agent, publican, and farmer. He was elected to the Murray Road Board in 1914, and remained a member for most of the rest of his life, including as chairman for around 30 years. Tuckey first stood for parliament at the 1930 state election, when he contested the Legislative Assembly. He was one of three Nationalist Party candidates in the seat of Murray-Wellington, with the eventual winner being Ross McLarty (a future premier). Tuckey won election to the Legislative Council at the 1934 elections, and was re-elected to two more six-year terms in 1940 and 1946. He died in office in March 1951, aged 66, after several months of ill health.
