= Charles Henning =

Australian politician

The Honourable Charles Henning

Member of the Legislative Council of Western Australia
- In office 2 June 1951 – 22 June 1955
- Preceded by: Hobart Tuckey
- Succeeded by: Francis D. Willmott
- Constituency: South-West Province

Personal details
- Born: 21 September 1897 Payneham, South Australia, Australia
- Died: 22 June 1955 (aged 57) Nedlands, Western Australia, Australia
- Party: Liberal
- Spouse: Muriel Doreen Paterson Joyner (m.1919–1955; his death)

Charles Harriot Henning (21 September 1897 – 22 June 1955) was an Australian military officer, farmer, and politician who was a Liberal Party member of the Legislative Council of Western Australia from 1951 until his death, representing South-West Province.

Henning was born in Adelaide, South Australia, to Lavinia Eleanora (née Stewart) and Andrew Harriot Henning. His father, a barrister, was also a member of parliament in Western Australia. In 1917, Henning enlisted in the 1st Australian Imperial Force (AIF), serving as a trooper with the 10th Light Horse Regiment. Although he was formally discharged from service in 1919, he remained involved with the military as a member of the Citizen Military Forces, eventually reaching the rank of captain. In that capacity, he represented Australia at the coronation of King George VI in 1937. Henning enlisted in the 2nd AIF in 1940, and was subsequently promoted major. He served with the 2/28th and 2/32nd Battalions.

After returning from World War I, Henning had farmed at Gnowangerup (in the Great Southern) until 1925. After a brief period as a commercial agent in Perth, he purchased a dairy farm in Hamel (in the South-West). Henning was elected to the Drakesbrook Road Board in 1932, and was elected chairman the following year. Outside of a gap during World War II, he remained on the board until 1948, including as chairman for several stretches. Henning entered parliament at a 1951 Legislative Council by-election for South-West Province, caused by the death of Hobart Tuckey. Re-elected in 1952, he remained in office until his death in June 1955 (aged 57).

Henning had married Muriel Joiner in 1919, with whom he had three children.
