= Harold Piesse =

Australian politician

The Honourable Harold Piesse

Member of the Legislative Council of Western Australia
- In office 22 May 1932 – 16 September 1944
- Preceded by: William Glasheen
- Succeeded by: Anthony Loton
- Constituency: South-East Province

Personal details
- Born: 12 July 1884 Williams, Western Australia
- Died: 16 September 1944 (aged 60) Katanning, Western Australia
- Party: Country

Harold Vivian Piesse (12 July 1884 – 16 September 1944) was an Australian politician who served as a member of the Legislative Council of Western Australia from 1932 until his death.

Piesse was born in Williams, Western Australia, to Mary Elizabeth (née Chipper) and Frederick Henry Piesse. His father and three uncles, Alfred, Arnold, and Charles Piesse, were all members of parliament, while a cousin, Edmund Piesse was a Senator for Western Australia. Piesse attended Hale School in Perth, before going on to Hawkesbury Agricultural College in New South Wales. After returning to his home state, he took over his father's farming interests in the Katanning region, and then his other business interests after his father's death, as well as developing property of his own. Piesse first stood for parliament at a 1931 Legislative Council by-election for South-East Province, (necessitated by the death of Hector Stewart), but was defeated by Alec Thomson. At the 1932 Legislative Council elections, he again contested South-East Province, and won election standing as an "independent Country Party" candidate. At all later elections, he stood as an endorsed Country Party candidate.

Piesse died in Katanning in September 1944, after a period of poor health.
