= Harold Seddon =

Australian politician (1881–1958)

The Honourable Sir Harold Seddon

8th President of the Legislative Council of Western Australia
- In office 26 November 1946 – 21 May 1954
- Preceded by: James Cornell
- Succeeded by: Anthony Loton

Member of the Legislative Council of Western Australia
- In office 22 May 1922 – 21 May 1954
- Preceded by: James Cunningham
- Succeeded by: John Teahan
- Constituency: North-East Province

Personal details
- Born: 6 March 1881 Openshaw, Lancashire, England
- Died: 25 February 1958 (aged 76) Kalgoorlie, Western Australia, Australia
- Party: Labor (to 1917); National Labor (1917–?); Nationalist (1922–1945); Liberal (from 1945)

Sir Harold Seddon (6 March 1881 – 25 February 1958) was an Australian politician who served as a member of the Legislative Council of Western Australia from 1922 to 1954. He was President of the Legislative Council from 1946 to 1954.

== Early life ==
Seddon was born in Openshaw, Lancashire, England, to Elizabeth Ann (née Davy) and William Seddon. His nephew, Harold Wilson, served twice as Prime Minister of the United Kingdom. After studying electrical engineering at the Manchester Technical Institute, Seddon worked for a period in the electrical department of the Great Central Railway. He emigrated to Australia in 1901, finding employment on the Eastern Goldfields as an electrical engineer with Western Australian Government Railways. Seddon became prominent in the Amalgamated Engineering Union, and also served on the Southern Cross Municipal Council.

== Politics and later life ==
After the Labor Party split of 1916, Seddon joined the newly formed National Labor Party. He stood as the party's candidate in the seat of Kalgoorlie at the 1917 state election, but was defeated by the sitting member, Labor's Albert Green. From 1920 to 1922, Seddon served on the Kalgoorlie Municipal Council. He was elected to parliament in May 1922, winning election to the Legislative Council's North-East Province as a Nationalist candidate.

In November 1946, following the death of the President of the Legislative Council, James Cornell, Seddon was elected in his place. He was knighted for his service in June 1951. He served as president until the 1954 election, when he was defeated by Labor's John Teahan (in one of a series of Labor victories). Seddon lived in Kalgoorlie in retirement, dying there in February 1958, aged 76. He had married Winifred Jean Dunstan in 1932, with whom he had two sons and two daughters.

== See also ==
- Members of the Western Australian Legislative Council

Parliament of Western Australia
Preceded by James Cunningham	Member for North-East Province; 1922-1954	Succeeded by John Teahan
Preceded by James Cornell	President of the Western Australian Legislative Council; 1946–1954	Succeeded by Anthony Loton
