= John Richardson (Western Australian politician) =

Pastoralist and politician in Western Australia

John Elliott Richardson
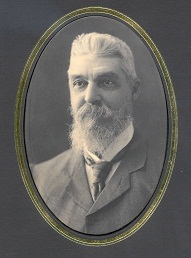

Member of the Western Australian Legislative Council
- In office July 1894 – 1904
- Constituency: North Province

Personal details
- Born: 31 May 1843 Richmond, Tasmania, Australia
- Died: 29 June 1914 (aged 71) Mulyie Station, Pilbara, Western Australia
- Occupation: Pastoralist, politician

John Elliott Richardson (31 May 1843 – 29 June 1914) was a Western Australian pastoralist and politician. He was a member of the Western Australian Legislative Council for the North Province from 1894 to 1904.

== Early life ==
Richardson was born on 31 May 1843 in Richmond, Tasmania, the eldest son of the Rev. Thomas Elliott Richardson, a Presbyterian minister, and his wife Jane (née Anderson). The family moved to Victoria. In 1865, Richardson joined his younger brother Alexander Robert Richardson in pioneering to the north-west of Western Australia. John and his brother Alex helped establish Pyramid Station on the George River near Roebourne in 1865. He later had interests in other stations.

== Political career ==
Richardson was elected to the Legislative Council in 1894 as a member for the North Province. He served until 1904.

== Personal life and later years ==
On 18 April 1877 he married Mary McKenzie at Roebourne, having several children together. Richardson moved to Broomehill. He died on 29 June 1914 at Mulyie Station in the Pilbara, aged 71.

His younger brother, Alexander Robert Richardson, was also a Member of the Legislative Council of Western Australia from 1887 to 1890. Alexander also represented the Electoral district of De Grey in the Legislative Assembly of Western Australia from 1890 to 1897.
