= Cuthbert McKenzie =

Australian politician

Cuthbert McKenzie (12 April 1851 - 16 February 1926) was an Australian politician. He was a member of the Western Australian Legislative Council for South-East Province from 1910 to 1922, as a Ministerialist (1910-1911) and as a member of the Liberal Party (1910-1914) and Country Party (1914-1922).

McKenzie was born at Albany, the son of a mariner. He was variously a merchant, coastal trader and whaler until 1881, when he married Grace Cheyne Moir and went into business in Albany as the proprietor of the Freemason's Hotel, then as a storekeeper and then publican in York Street. He was the proprietor of the White Hart Hotel from 1897; he also owned the York Hotel at that time. He was a councillor of the Municipality of Albany from 1888 until 1898 and was mayor for seven of the years between 1898 and 1908. He was appointed a justice of the peace for the Plantagenet district in 1898 and for the whole state in 1907.

McKenzie was elected to the Legislative Council at the triennial election in May 1910 as a Ministerialist candidate. He was unable to tour the electorate during the campaign due to health issues, but campaigned on a platform of a reduction in the property qualification for Legislative Council franchise, introducing a local option for prohibition of alcohol, the establishment of a public works committee, building new railways in the region and reforming the system for taking up land. He joined the Liberal Party at its formation in 1911, but defected to the new Country Party in 1914. He retired from the Legislative Council in 1922. He supported the Ministerial Country Party in the Country Party split of 1923.

He lived in retirement after leaving politics and was practically confined to his home due to ill health from late 1925. He died in 1926 and was buried in the Church of England section of the Old Albany Cemetery.
