= Samuel Johnson Haynes =

Australian lawyer and politician

The Honourable Samuel Haynes

Member of the Legislative Council of Western Australia
- In office 16 July 1894 – 2 May 1910
- Preceded by: None (new seat)
- Succeeded by: Cuthbert McKenzie
- Constituency: South-East Province

Personal details
- Born: 22 March 1852 Leek, Staffordshire, England
- Died: 3 February 1932 (aged 79) Albany, Western Australia, Australia

Samuel Johnson Haynes (22 March 1852 – 3 February 1932) was an Australian barrister and politician who served as a member of the Legislative Council of Western Australia from 1894 to 1910, representing South-East Province.

Haynes was born in Leek, Staffordshire, England, to Sarah Ann (née Johnson) and George Haynes. His parents left for Australia when he was a small child, settling in Port Fairy, Victoria. Haynes was sent to grammar school in England, but returned to Australia to study law. He completed his legal studies in South Australia, and was called to the bar there in 1886. In 1888, Haynes moved to Albany, Western Australia, where he established his own law firm. He eventually went into partnership with Robert Thomson Robinson, a future Attorney-General of Western Australia. Haynes was elected to parliament at the 1894 Legislative Council elections, which were the first to be held since the advent of responsible government in 1890. His initial term was for four years, but he was re-elected to six-year terms in 1898 and 1904. Haynes retired from parliament in 1910, shortly before the expiration of his third term. Haynes died in Albany in February 1932, aged 79. Outside of politics, he had served as chancellor of the Anglican Diocese of Bunbury for many years. He married Isabella Cole in 1897, with whom he had one son.
