= James Greig (Australian politician) =

Australian politician

James Greig MLC

Member of the Western Australian Legislative Council for South-East Province
- In office 20 April 1916 – 1925

James Alexander Greig (10 September 1872 – 22 June 1925) was an Australian politician. He was a member of the Western Australian Legislative Council representing the South-East Province from his election on 20 April 1916 until the end of his term in 1925. Greig was a member of the Country Party.
