= Parliament House, Perth =

House of parliament for the state of Western Australia

Parliament House
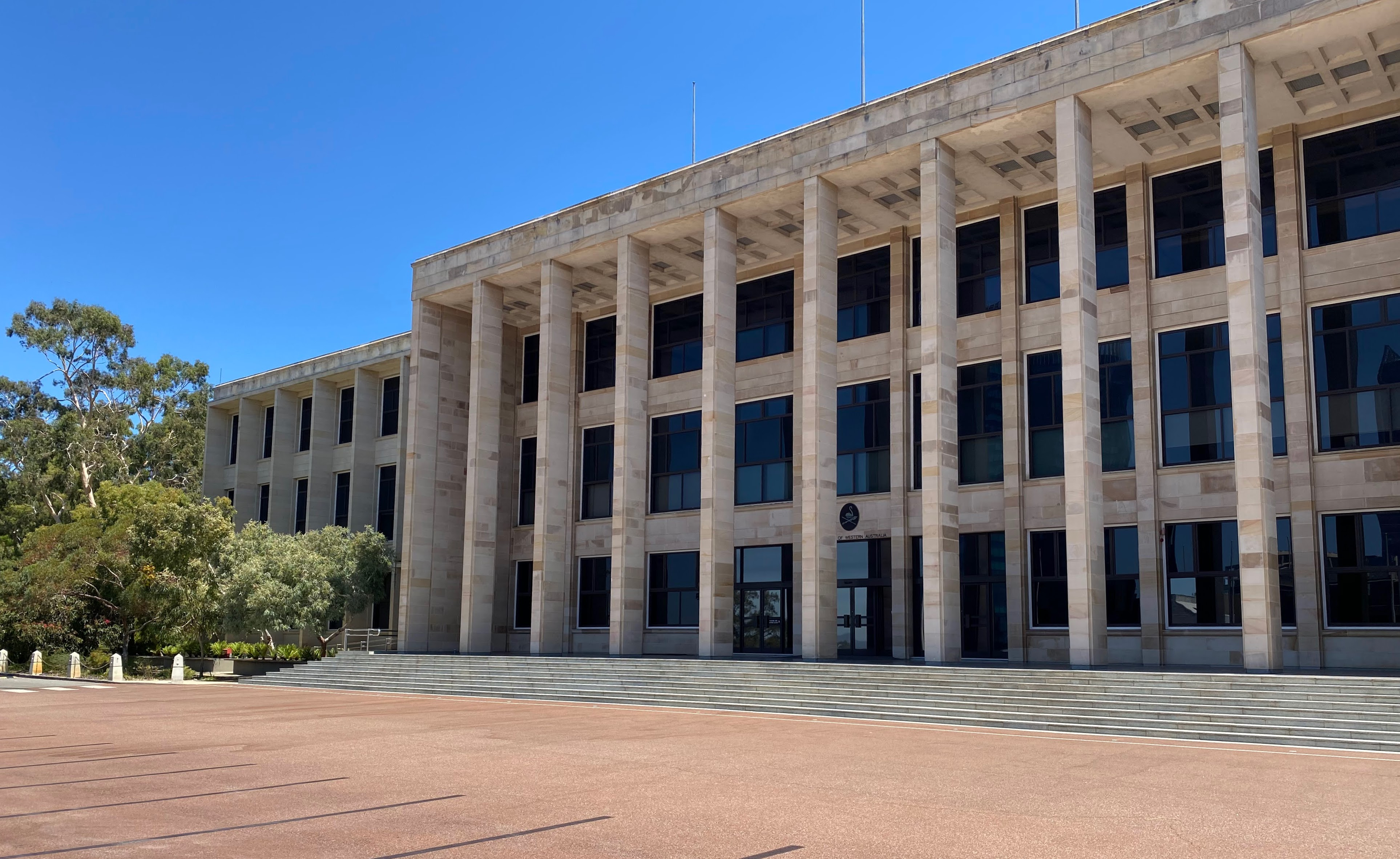
- East side of Parliament House

- Location within Perth
- Parliament House (●) is situated in West Perth, and faces the Barracks Arch across the Mitchell Freeway near the western terminus of St Georges Terrace.

General information
- Status: Completed
- Type: Government
- Architectural style: Federation Academic Classical
- Location: West Perth, Harvest Terrace, Perth, Western Australia, Australia
- Coordinates: 31°57′06″S 115°50′50″E
- Current tenants: Parliament of Western Australia
- Construction started: 1902; 124 years ago
- Completed: 1904; 122 years ago
- Opened: 28 July 1904; 122 years ago

Design and construction
- Architects: John Grainger and Hillson Beasley
- Architecture firm: Public Works Department

Website
- www.parliament.wa.gov.au

Western Australia Heritage Register
- Type: State Registered Place
- Designated: 24 September 2004
- Reference no.: 2239

Parliament House is located on Harvest Terrace in West Perth, Western Australia. It is the home of the Parliament of Western Australia, including the Legislative Council (upper house) and Legislative Assembly (lower house).

== History ==
=== Location ===
The Swan River Colony's original (1832) Legislative Council was housed in small 1830s government offices in St Georges Terrace, and the (1890) Legislative Assembly in Howick Street near the Town Hall. An 1897 Royal Commission recommended proposals to house the Legislative Council and Legislative Assembly in the same building, and suggested two possible locations: the site of the existing Legislative Council in St Georges Terrace, and the hill in Harvest Terrace, behind the Pensioner Barracks. After designs were completed for both sites, the Royal Commission recommended the St Georges Terrace site. Politicians John Winthrop Hackett and George Leake favoured the Harvest Terrace site, which was eventually chosen by Parliament.

=== Design ===
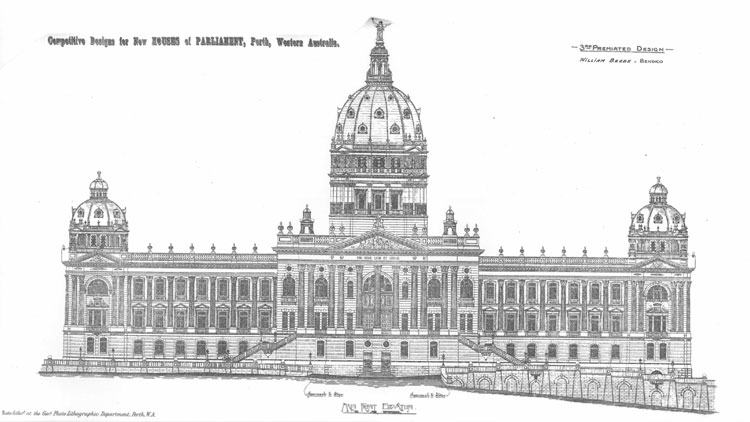
1900 design for Parliament House that includes a dome

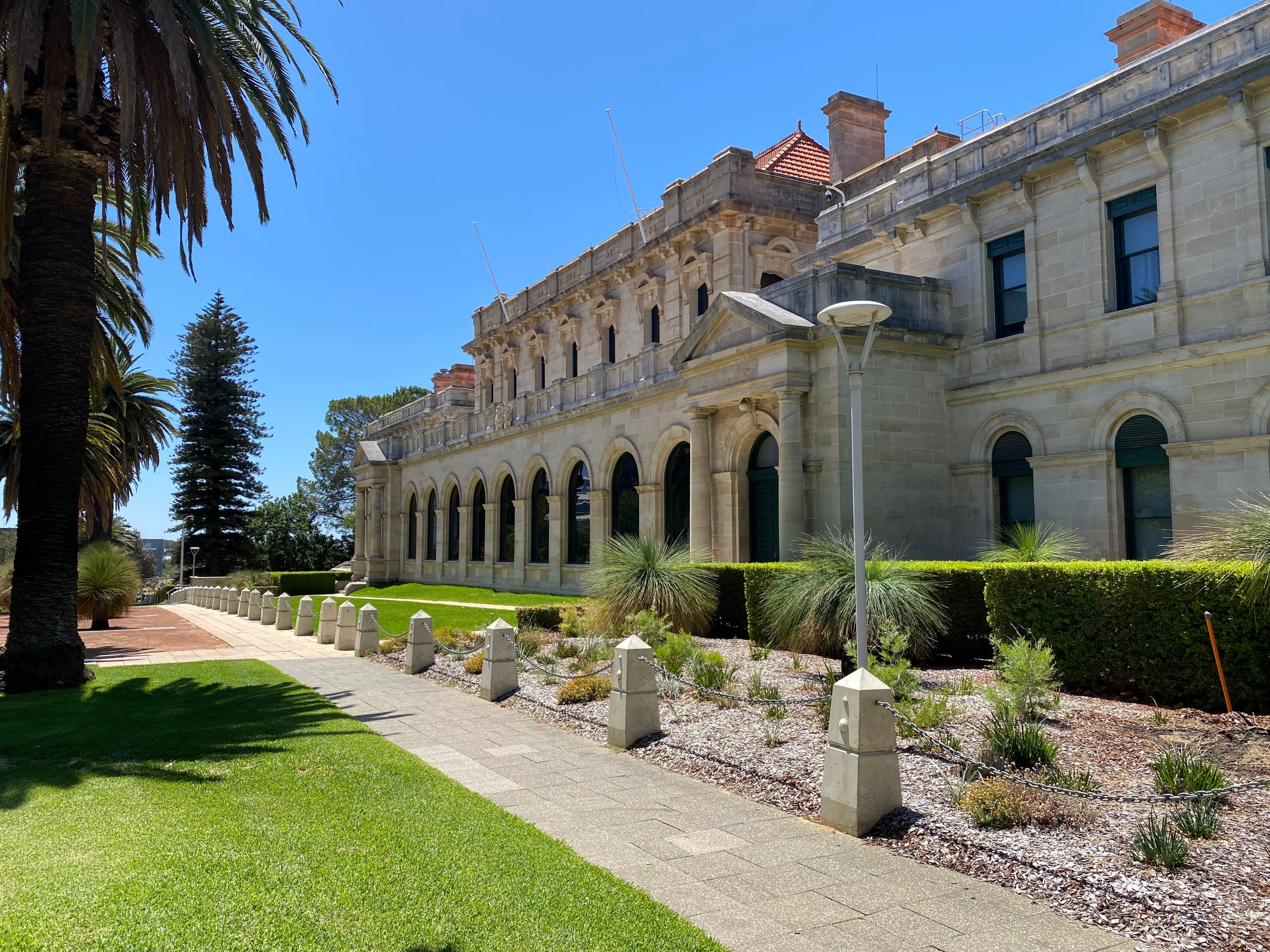
West side of Parliament House

An Australia-wide competition was held for the design of Parliament House, adjudicated by the government architect of New South Wales. He did not recommend any of the entries, but gave awards of merit. One of the awards went to four officers of the Public Works Department. The decision was then referred to the parliamentary committee, which awarded the design to the Public Works Department whose chief architects were John Grainger and Hillson Beasley, who became acting chief from November 1903 during Grainger's absence through illness.

=== Construction ===
Building of the first stage of Parliament House commenced in 1902. The façade was designed in a Federation Academic Classical style with walls constructed of local brick and tile facing from Rottnest Island, Donnybrook stone, jarrah woodwork and locally made clay tiles. A large general room for members and a library were added to the initial design during construction, which was completed in 1904. The building opened on 28 July 1904, and The West Australian commented:

When the assembly members trooped into the Council Chamber to hear the Commission read, the visitors had time to criticise the extraordinary colour scheme of the Assembly Chamber, count the hundreds of black swans swimming in the blue sea of carpet, comment on the dizzying height of the galleries, and draw comparisons – born of the wearying display of stained glass and coloured wood – between the general appearance of the Chamber and that of a glorified saloon [...].

The eastern (city) wing was added between 1958 and 1964 at a cost of £A 416,500, equivalent to A$13.1 million in 2022. The eastern façade was designed on a Stripped Classical style. The building was extended to the south in 1978.

During the 1980s, uneventful proposals were put forward to extend the structure eastwards by covering the adjoining Mitchell Freeway, incorporating commercial development, and connecting the Parliament House precinct with St Georges Terrace.

The lion and unicorn statues originally located on the western side of Parliament House are from the Houses of Parliament in London. The statues now located on the western façade are replicas, the replica unicorn and lion are known as Katherine and Digby respectively, with the original statues displayed inside the building. They were presented to the Parliament of Western Australia by the Empire Parliamentary Association and placed on the façade in 1936. The lion represents England and the unicorn symbolises Scotland.

== Solidarity Park ==
In 1997, protesting union workers established the Workers' Embassy on vacant land opposite Parliament House, a site which was later reserved and named Solidarity Park by a subsequent Labor government.
