= Frederick Crowder (politician) =

Australian politician

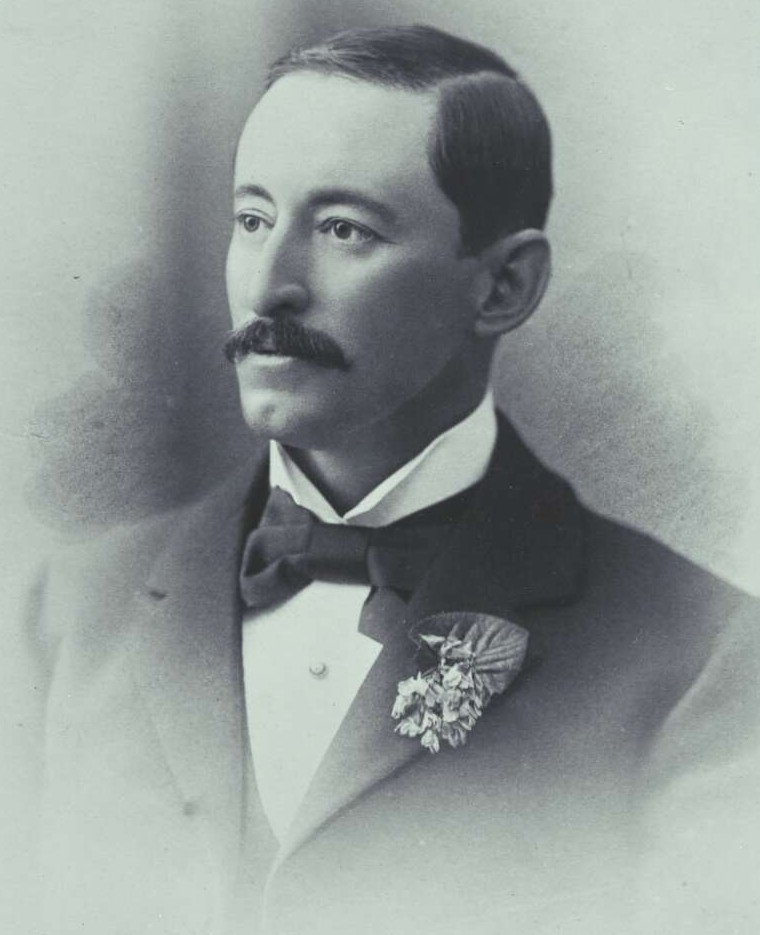
Frederick Thomas Crowder from the 1898 Australasian Federal Convention Album

Frederick Thomas Crowder ( 21 January 1856 – 1902), generally referred to as F. T. Crowder, was an Australian businessman and politician and member of the Western Australian Legislative Council for two terms: in 1894–1900 representing South-East Province, and 1901–1902 representing East Province. He died in office and was succeeded by William Loton.

== History ==
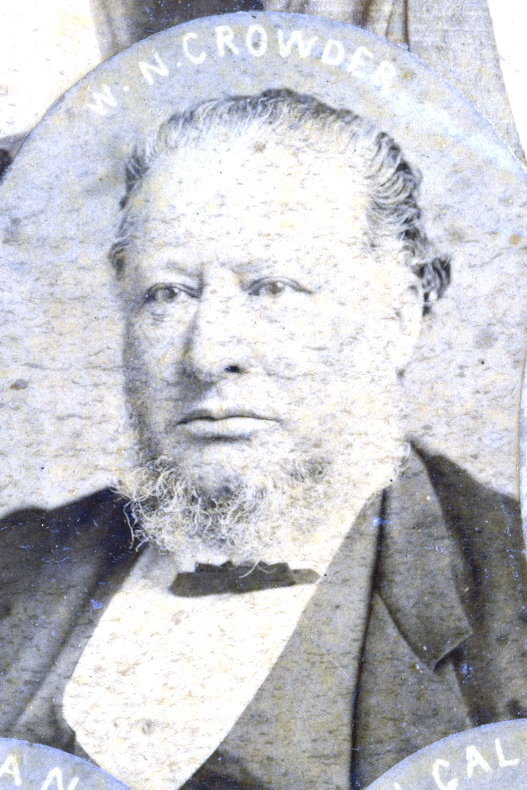
William N. Crowder in 1872

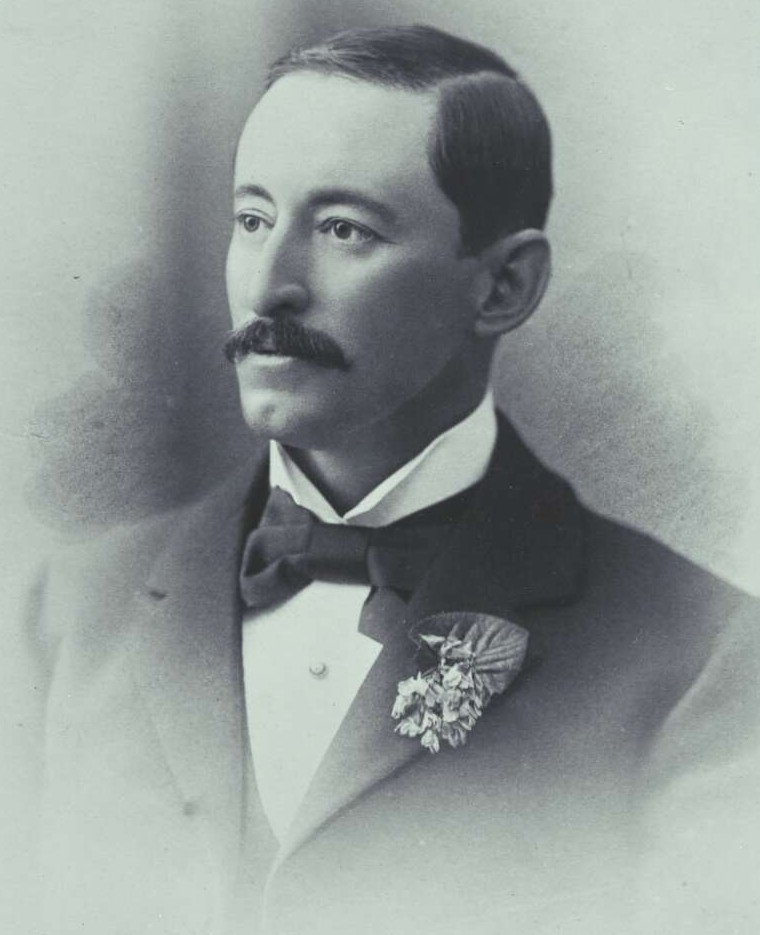
Crowder at the 1898 Australasian Federal Convention.

Crowder was born in Franklin Street, Adelaide, the second son of William Nathaniel Crowder (c. 1818 – 2 February 1898) who arrived in South Australia in 1839 on the barque Singapore. His wife Emily (c. 1829 – December 1867) is not recorded as a passenger, and it is likely they married around 1850. (Note: William Alfred Crowder (1854–1891) who married Isabella Brown McCallum on 25 July 1878 was W. N. Crowder's first child.) W. N. Crowder ran J. H. Fisher's dairy at The Reedbeds, until the early 1850s, spent some time unprofitably at the Victorian goldfields, then in 1854 took over the insolvent George Malcolm's aerated water and cordial manufacturing business in Franklin Street which he ran successfully then sold to Charles Downer and John Henderson in 1881. They had a home "Olive Villa" in Lower Mitcham, which still stands.

Crowder was educated at J. L. Young's Adelaide Educational Institution and after leaving school joined his father's business, married in 1876, then in 1878 left Adelaide for Western Australia with William Letchford to open an aerated water and cordial business of Crowder and Letchford in Essex Street, Fremantle in 1878. They won prizes at the 1881 Exhibition. and opened a factory in Goderich Street, Perth, in 1884, whose assets were sold to Crowder and Letchford Ltd. in 1896, later purchased by the firm of Donaldson and Collins.

In 1894 he was appointed director of Mount Eva Mining company with a goldfield at Coolgardie.

His wife died and sometime later he remarried and retired from manufacturing business.

He was for twenty years chairman of directors of Perth Gas Company.

He served for some time on the Perth City Council then in 1894 entered Parliament as member for the South-East Province of Perth, and was subsequently nominated as a delegate to the Federal Convention, and had the opportunity to revisit Adelaide and meet his old schoolmates. He opposed the entrance of Western Australia into the Federation so resigned his seat, but a year later he was elected to the West Australian Legislative Council for the Central division. He was returned unopposed for the East province a fortnight before his death at his home "Abbeyfeale View" at Cottesloe Beach.

== Family ==
Crowder married Annie Imelda Fitzpatrick (c. 1855 – 21 January 1886) on 17 March 1877. They had one daughter

- Ellie May Crowder (1878–1951), proprietor Rose Hotel, North Fremantle, bankrupt 1933.

He married again, on 9 May 1886 in Perth, to Mary Ann Linto (c. 1862 – 26 December 1927). They had two sons:

- William Frederick Crowder (1887 – 24 October 1953) married Dorothy, divorced 1920

- Frederick Thomas "Dick" Crowder (30 December 1916 – 20 February 1942) shot while POW in Timor

- Frederick Sinclair Crowder (1898 – 13 November 1953) married Marjorie Elizabeth Dethridge, of Perth on 28 November 1927

She married again, to Robert Dawson Higgs.

== Notes and references ==
- Black, David (1991). Legislative Council of Western Australia : membership register, electoral law and statistics, 1890-1989. Perth: Parliamentary History Project. ISBN 0-7309-3641-4.
- Black, David; Bolton, Geoffrey (2001a). Biographical Register of Members of the Parliament of Western Australia. Vol. One: 1870–1930 (Revised ed.). Parliament House: Parliament of Western Australia. ISBN 0730738140.
