= South-East Province =

The South-East Province was an electoral region of the Western Australian Legislative Council, introduced after the introduction of responsible government in the 1890s. It initially comprised Williams, Plantagenet, and Albany Electoral Districts.

== Members ==
Three members (1894–1965)
Member 1	Party	Term	Member 2	Party	Term	Member 3	Party	Term
Frederick Crowder	None	1894–1900	Samuel Haynes	None	1894–1910	Charles Piesse	None	1894–1914
Wesley Maley	None	1900–1909	Samuel Haynes	None	1894–1910	Charles Piesse	None	1894–1914
Joseph Cullen	None	1909–1910	Samuel Haynes	None	1894–1910	Charles Piesse	None	1894–1914
Joseph Cullen	Liberal	1910–1917	Cuthbert McKenzie	Liberal	1910–1914	Charles Piesse	Liberal	1910–1914
Joseph Cullen	Liberal	1910–1917	Cuthbert McKenzie	Country	1914–1922	George Sewell	Country	1914–1916
Joseph Cullen	Liberal	1910–1917	Cuthbert McKenzie	Country	1914–1922	James Greig	Country	1916–1925
Hector Stewart	Country	1917–1931	Cuthbert McKenzie	Country	1914–1922	James Greig	Country	1916–1925
Hector Stewart	Country	1917–1931	Alfred Burvill	Country	1922–1928	James Greig	Country	1916–1925
Hector Stewart	Country	1917–1931	Alfred Burvill	Country	1922–1928	William Glasheen	Country	1925–1932
Hector Stewart	Country	1917–1931	Charles Wittenoom	Country	1928–1940	William Glasheen	Country	1925–1932
Alec Thomson	Country	1931–1950	Charles Wittenoom	Country	1928–1940	William Glasheen	Country	1925–1932
Alec Thomson	Country	1931–1950	Charles Wittenoom	Country	1928–1940	Harold Piesse	Ind. Country	1932–1938
Alec Thomson	Country	1931–1950	Charles Wittenoom	Country	1928–1940	Harold Piesse	Country	1938–1944
Alec Thomson	Country	1931–1950	Hugh Roche	Country	1940–1950	Harold Piesse	Country	1938–1944
Alec Thomson	Country	1931–1950	Hugh Roche	Country	1940–1950	Anthony Loton	Country	1944–1950
Major reconstitution in 1950 – existing South-East Province members effectively swapped with existing South Province members.
Robert Boylen	Labor	1950–1955	John Cunningham	Liberal	1950–1954	George Bennetts	Labor	1950–1965
Robert Boylen	Labor	1950–1955	Jim Garrigan	None	1954–1965	George Bennetts	Labor	1950–1965
John Cunningham	Liberal	1955–1962	Jim Garrigan	None	1954–1965	George Bennetts	Labor	1950–1965
Claude Stubbs	None	1962–1965	Jim Garrigan	None	1954–1965	George Bennetts	Labor	1950–1965

Two members (1965–1989)
Member	Party	Term	Member	Party	Term
Jim Garrigan	Labor	1965–1971	Claude Stubbs	Labor	1965–1980
Ron Leeson	Labor	1971–1983	Claude Stubbs	Labor	1965–1980
Ron Leeson	Labor	1971–1983	Jim Brown	Labor	1980–1989
Mark Nevill	Labor	1983–1989	Jim Brown	Labor	1980–1989
