= Charles Piesse =

Australian businessman and politician

The Honourable Charles Piesse

Member of the Legislative Council of Western Australia
- In office 16 July 1894 – 13 July 1914
- Preceded by: None (new seat)
- Succeeded by: George Sewell
- Constituency: South-East Province

Personal details
- Born: 11 November 1855 Northam, Western Australia, Australia
- Died: 13 July 1914 (aged 58) Perth, Western Australia, Australia

Charles Austin Piesse (11 November 1855 – 13 July 1914) was an Australian businessman and politician who served as a member of the Legislative Council of Western Australia from 1894 until his death. He was a minister in the government of Newton Moore.

Piesse was born in Northam, Western Australia, to Elizabeth Ellen (née Oxley) and William Roper Piesse. His three brothers, Alfred, Arnold, and Frederick Piesse, were also members of parliament. After leaving school, Piesse was briefly involved in the pearling trade at Shark Bay, later purchasing a farm near Williams (a small Wheatbelt farm). In 1880, he went into business with his brother Frederick, formed the firm of F. &. C. Piesse. They initially ran a general store at Williams, but later expanded to Arthur River, Wagin, and Katanning.

In 1887, Piesse was elected as the first chairman of the newly created Arthur Roads Board, serving in the position until 1890. He was elected to parliament at the 1894 Legislative Council elections, as a representative of the South-East Province. After his initial two-year term, Piesse was re-elected to six-year terms in 1896, 1902, 1908, and 1914. From 1906 to 1907, he served as a minister without portfolio in the ministry of Newton Moore. Piesse died in Perth in July 1914, of heart disease. He had married twice, having nine children by his first wife (Martha Chipper) and three by his second (Flora Hickson). One of his daughters-in-law, Winifred Piesse and a nephew, Harold, were also members of parliament in Western Australia. A second nephew, Edmund Piesse was a Senator for Western Australia.
