= History of Western Australia =

The human history of Western Australia commenced "over 50,000 years ago and possibly as much as 70,000 years ago" with the arrival of Aboriginal Australians on the northwest coast. The first inhabitants expanded across the east and south of the continent.

The first recorded European contact was in 1616, when Dutch explorer Dirk Hartog landed on the west coast, having been blown off course while en route to Batavia, current day Jakarta.

Although many expeditions visited the coast during the next 200 years, there was no lasting attempt at establishing a permanent settlement until December 1826. An expedition on behalf of the New South Wales colonial government, led by Major Edmund Lockyer, landed at King George Sound, and founded what became the port city of Albany. On 21 January 1827 Lockyer formally took possession for the British Crown the portion of New Holland not yet claimed by the crown; (Note: These claims by the British Crown were in competition to possession and occupancy by Aboriginal and Torres Strait Islander peoples that predate the claims by the British Crown by tens of millennia.) that is, the portion west of 129th meridian east. This was followed by the establishment of the Swan River Colony in 1829, which ultimately became the present-day capital, Perth. The harsh conditions faced by the settlers resulted in population growth being minimal until the discovery of gold in the 1880s. Since the gold rush, the population of the state has risen steadily, with substantial growth in the period since World War II.

Western Australia gained the right of self-government in 1890, and joined with the five other states to form the Commonwealth of Australia in 1901. The desire of Western Australians to revert to complete self-governance, separate from the Commonwealth, culminated in 1933 with a successful referendum for secession supported by 68% of electors. In 1935 the British parliament declined to act since secession would require the assent of the Australian parliament, and the movement lapsed with an improving economy and generous federal grants.

== Aboriginal settlement ==
When Australia's first inhabitants arrived on the northwest coast 50,000 to 70,000 years ago the sea levels were much lower. The Kimberley coast at one time was only about 90 kilometres (56 mi) from Timor, which itself was the last in a line of closely spaced islands for humans to travel across. Therefore, this was a possible (even probable) location for which Australia's first peoples could arrive via boat. Other possible immigration routes were via islands further north and then through New Guinea.

In 1999 Charles Dortch identified chert and calcrete flake stone tools, found at Rottnest Island, as possibly dating to at least 50,000 years ago. A 2018 study using archaeobotany dated evidence of continuous human habitation at Karnatukul (Serpent's Glen) in the Carnarvon Range in the Little Sandy Desert from around 50,000 years ago.

Over the next tens of thousands of years various groups of Indigenous Australians slowly moved southward and eastward across the landmass. Aboriginal people were well established throughout Western Australia by the time European ships started accidentally arriving en route to Batavia (now Jakarta) in the early 17th century.

== Early visits by Europeans ==
The first European to sight Western Australia was the Dutch explorer, Dirk Hartog, the first European to suggest to have found a continent there, who on 26 October 1616 landed at what is now known as Cape Inscription, Dirk Hartog Island. Before departing, Hartog left behind an inscribed pewter plate affixed to a post. In 1696 the plate was discovered and replaced by Willem de Vlamingh and repatriated to the Rijksmuseum in Amsterdam. A multitude of Dutch visits followed during that century, charting virtually the whole of the west coast, the Western Australian south coast and Australia's northern coast.

The first English vessel to visit, when attempting to sail the Dutch-established Brouwer Route to the Indies, was Tryall, an East India Company-owned East Indiaman under the command of John Brookes who in 1622 sighted Point Cloates before later on 25 May wrecking on Tryal Rocks, off the northwest coast of Australia. Some of the 143 crew remained on the Monte Bello Islands for 7 days, during that time sighting Barrow Island, before sailing to Batavia in a longboat. A second boat brought some more crew to Batavia, so just over 40 people survived, including Brookes. Almost one hundred crew apparently perished in the wreck. Tryall became Australia's oldest known shipwreck.

A later English visitor was William Dampier, who in 1699 sailed down some of the western coast of Australia. He noted the lack of water and in his description of Shark Bay in his account "A Voyage to New Holland", he expressed his frustration:

It was the 7th of August when we came into Shark's Bay; in which we anchored at three several places, and stayed at the first of them (on the west side of the bay) till the 11th. During which time we searched about, as I said, for fresh water, digging wells, but to no purpose.

— William Dampier

A number of sections of the Western Australian coastline were given names which did not last past the exploratory era in names of features – such as Eendrachtsland. However some names, such as 't Landt van de Leeuwin (Leeuwin's Land), materialised at a later date as Cape Leeuwin.

=== Timeline of European discovery and exploration ===
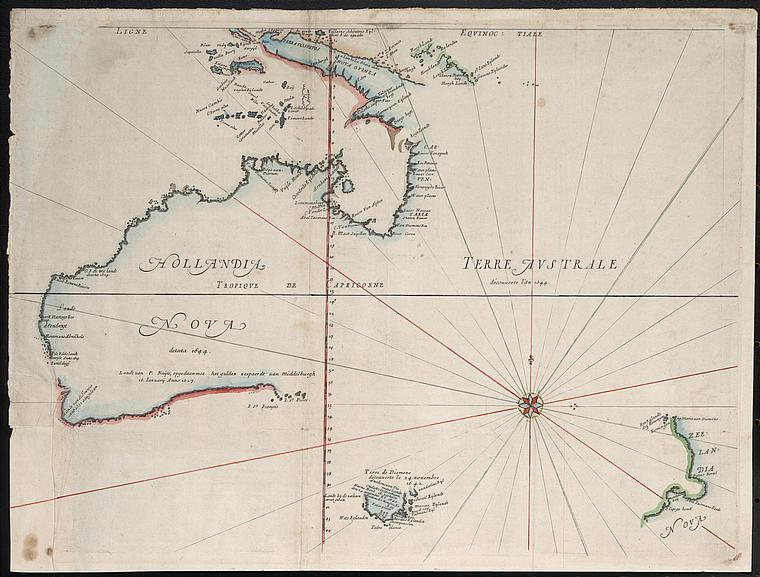
1672 reprint of the Melchisédech Thévenot map, which added an eastern boundary to Abel Tasman's 1644 chart of Dutch claims to New Holland along the Zaragoza antimeridian from the Treaty of Zaragoza of 1529 between Castile and Portugal, and which complemented the Tordesillas meridian from the Treaty of Tordesillas of 1494

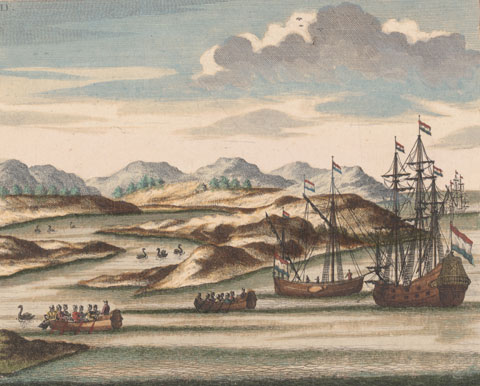
Willem de Vlamingh's ships at the entrance to the Swan River, 1697

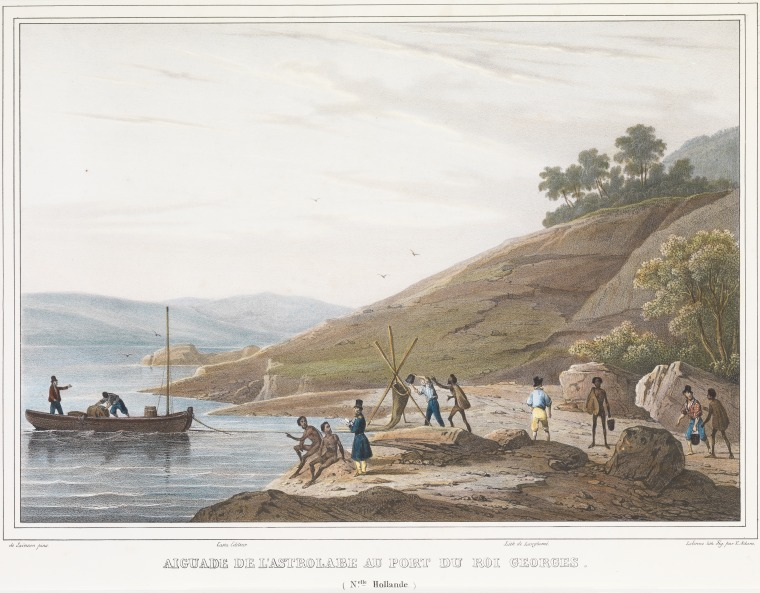
Crew of the French ship L'Astrolabe make contact with Aboriginal people at King George Sound, 1826

Below is a timeline of significant events from the 1616 landfall of Dirk Hartog until the eventual settlement of the Swan River Colony in 1829:

- 1616: Dirk Hartog aboard Eendracht arrived at Cape Inscription and left a pewter plate. Coastal region in the vicinity is shown on Hartog's maps as Eendrachtsland. Believed to be first landfall on Western Australian soil by Europeans. (An earlier 1606 encounter on the northern coast of Australia near Papua New Guinea by Willem Janszoon on Duyfken is credited as being the first Australian visit by European explorers.)
- 1618: Dutch East India Company supercargo Willem Janszoon on Mauritius landed on North West Cape – although sighting footprints, they did not meet the Indigenous Australians.
- 1618: Zeewulf made landfall north of Eendrachtsland.
- 1619: Frederick de Houtman in two ships bound for Batavia encountered dangerous shoals which were subsequently named Houtman Abrolhos. Following successful navigation of the Abrolhos, Houtman made landfall in the region Hartog had encountered.
- 1622: Leeuwin landed south of Abrolhos.
- 1622: English ship Tryall was wrecked on Tryal Rocks off the northwest coast; survivors spent a week on Monte Bello Islands before sailing to Batavia in a longboat.
- 1626–1627: Gulden Zeepaert skippered by François Thijssen sailed along south coast towards Great Australian Bight.
- 1629: Batavia struck a reef of the Abrolhos. Skipper Francisco Pelsaert sailed the ship's small boat to Batavia for rescue. After returning three months later, he found evidence of mutiny and many previous survivors murdered.
- 1656: Vergulde Draeck en route to Batavia was shipwrecked 107 km (66 mi) north of the Swan River near Ledge Point
- 1658: Three Dutch ships visited south coast searching for Vergulde Draeck: Waekende Boey under Captain S. Volckertszoon, Elburg under Captain J. Peereboom and Emeloort under Captain A. Joncke.
- 1681: English navigator John Daniel on New London charted part of the west coast of Australia, including Rottnest Island and the Wallabi Group of Houtman Abrolhos.
- 1688 and 1699: William Dampier in Cygnet explored the northwest coastline and sailed down the coast.
- 1697: Willem de Vlamingh found Hartog's plate and replaced it with his own. He also explored the Swan River area.
- 1712: Zuytdorp with 286 on board was shipwrecked near Kalbarri. The Dutch did not send a search party, probably because no survivors were able to report the disaster. The crew were never heard from again, though it is probable that many initially survived because a campsite was found near the wreck.
- 1714: Jean-Pierre Pury proposed a Dutch East India Company settlement of Nuyts, Leeuwin and Edels Lands.
- 1772: On 30 March, Frenchman Louis Aleno de St Aloüarn landed at Turtle Bay at the northern end of Dirk Hartog Island and claimed the island for France.
- 1786: King Gustav III of Sweden makes a contract with William Bolts to establish a colony at the Swan River.
- 1791: George Vancouver made formal claim at Possession Point, King George Sound, Albany.
- 1792: Frenchman Bruni d'Entrecasteaux in charge of Recherche and Espérance reached Cape Leeuwin on 5 December and explored eastward along the southern coast.
- 1801: The French ships Géographe and Naturaliste under Nicolas Baudin and Emmanuel Hamelin, explored much of the coast north from Cape Leeuwin, including the Swan River. They discovered de Vlamingh's plate.
- 1801: Matthew Flinders on HMS Investigator sighted Cape Leeuwin en route to charting of southern Australian coastline.
- 1803: Matthew Flinders completed the first circumnavigation of Australia
- 1803: Géographe and another French ship Casuarina followed much of the same coastline again on the way back to France.
- 1818: Louis de Freycinet found de Vlamingh's plate and removed it to France.
- 1826: On 26 October, Frenchman Dumont d'Urville in another ship named Astrolabe visited King George Sound before sailing along the south coast to Port Jackson.
- 1826: On 26 December, a military garrison was established on behalf of New South Wales at King George Sound with the arrival of Major Edmund Lockyer on Amity.
- 1827: On 21 January, Lockyer formally annexed the western portion of Australia, now Western Australia, in a ceremony at King George Sound.
- 1829: James Stirling explored the Swan River area. Captain Charles Fremantle again took possession of the western side of New Holland for the British crown on 2 May.

Swan River Colony (1829–1832) Colony of Western Australia (1832–1901)
- British Crown Colony
- 1829–1901
- Flag (1870–1901)

- Government
  - Type: Self-governing colony
- Monarch
  - 1829–1830: George IV first
  - 1837–1901: Victoria last
- Governor
  - 1829–1832: James Stirling first
  - 1895–1900: Gerard Smith last
- History
  - Established: 1829
  - Federation of Australia: 1901
Succeeded by
Western Australia

== Colonial era ==
=== King George Sound ===
The first formal claim of possession for Great Britain was made on 29 September 1791 by Commander (later Captain) George Vancouver RN, on a spot he named Possession Point, at the tip of the peninsula between the waters he also named Princess Royal Harbour and King George the Third's Sound at Albany (the Third was dropped from the name in 1826).

In the early 19th century, the British became concerned about the possibility of a French colony being established on the west coast of Australia. In 1826, the Governor of New South Wales, Ralph Darling, ordered the establishment of a settlement at King George's Sound. An army detachment was sent from Sydney headed by Major Edmund Lockyer with eighteen soldiers, one captain, one doctor, one storekeeper and twenty-three convicts.

On 21 January 1827, the whole of Australia was claimed as British territory for the first time when Major Lockyer formally annexed the western portion of the continent in a ceremony on King George Sound.

In March 1831, the penal settlement was withdrawn, and the control of King George's Sound was transferred from New South Wales to the Swan River Colony. Captain James Stirling decreed that the settlement would be named Albany from 1 January 1832.

=== The Swan River Colony ===
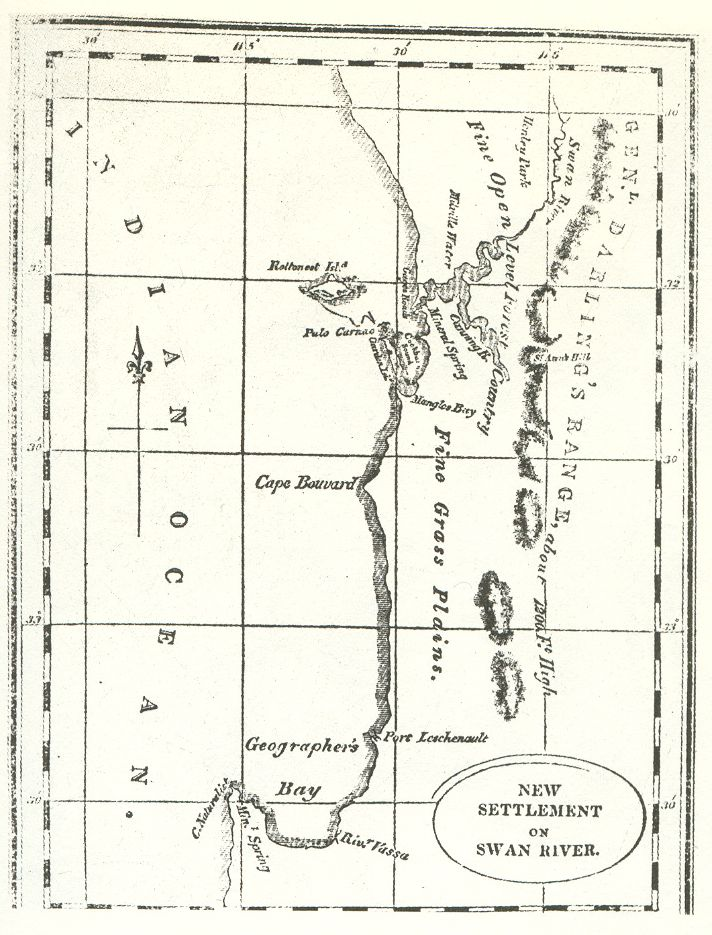
The Swan River colony

The first documented European settlements were established at the Swan River by James Stirling in 1829. The colonists first sighted land on 1 June, arrived in Cockburn Sound on 2 June, an official proclamation was made on 18 June and the foundation of the colony took place on 12 August. As Lieutenant Governor, Stirling had sole authority to draft laws and decide day-to-day affairs. On 6 February 1832, the colony was renamed Western Australia.

Major towns of the colony developed slowly into the port city of Fremantle, the main settlement of Perth 20 kilometres (12 mi) upriver, and Guildford.

=== Expansion 1829–1850 ===
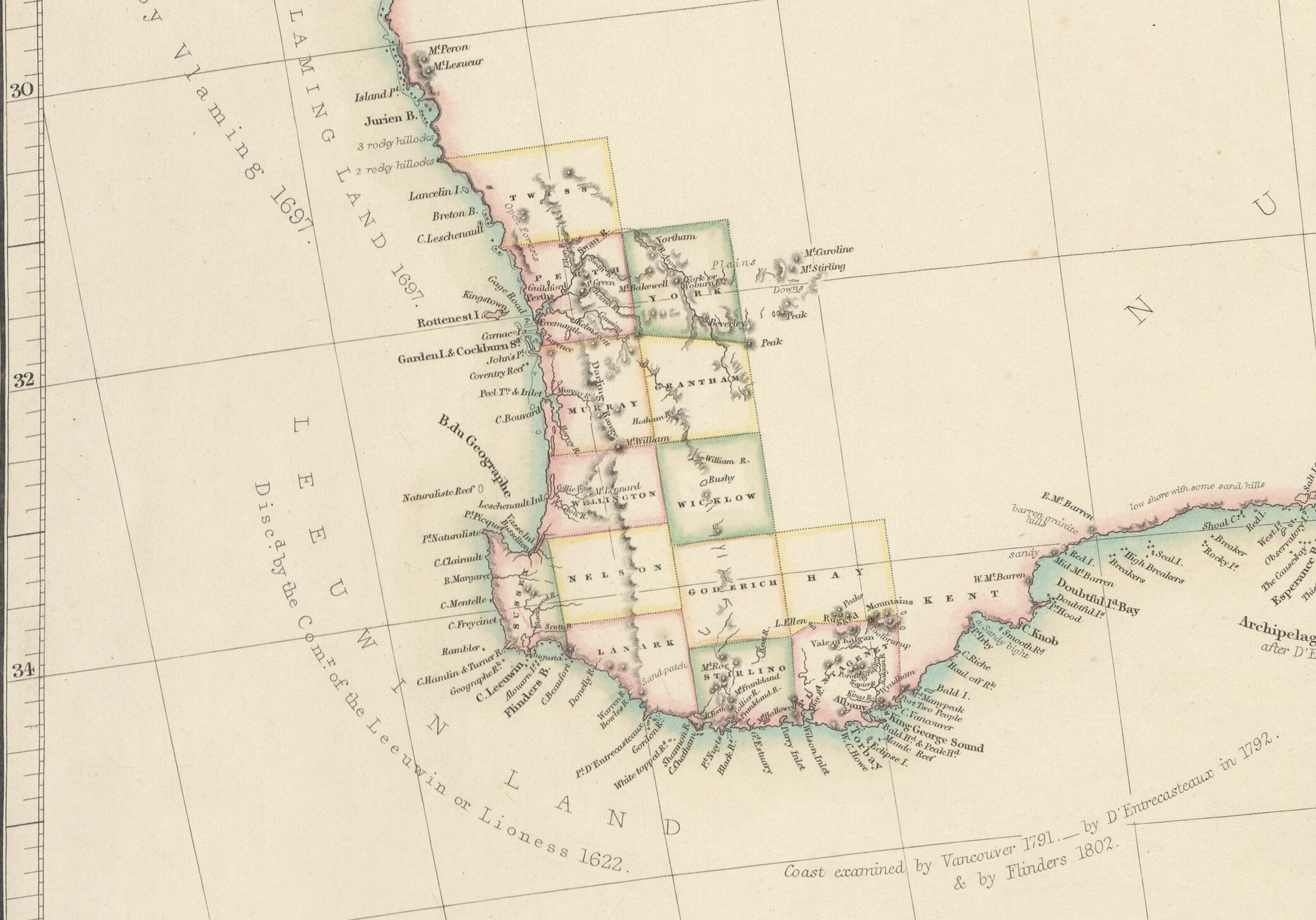
The settled counties of the Colony of Western Australia, c. 1838

Much of the land around the Swan River Colony was unsuitable for agriculture and it was inevitable that the colony would have to expand beyond the Swan River area after the most fertile locations were quickly settled.

Sheep farming was the most successful early agricultural activity, and the basis of all expansion until the 1850s.

Government of Western Australia Act 1829
- Act of Parliament
- Parliament of the United Kingdom
- Long title: An Act to provide until the Thirty-first Day of December One thousand eight hundred and thirty-four, for the Government of His Majesty's Settlements in Western Australia, on the Western Coast of New Holland.
- Citation: 10 Geo. 4. c. 22
- Territorial extent: United Kingdom

Dates
- Royal assent: 14 May 1829
- Commencement: 14 May 1829 (Note: The Acts of Parliament (Commencement) Act 1793.)
- Expired: 31 December 1834 (Note: Section 2.)
- Repealed: 5 August 19873
Other legislation
Amended by	Western Australia Government Act 1835; Western Australia Government Act 1836; Western Australia Government Act 1838; Western Australia Government Act 1841; Western Australia Government Act 1842; Western Australia Government Act 1846
Repealed by	Statute Law Revision Act 1873

Status: Repealed

Text of statute as originally enacted

Western Australia Government Act 1835
- Act of Parliament
- Parliament of the United Kingdom
- Long title: An Act to continue to the Thirty-first Day of December One thousand eight hundred and thirty-six, and from thence to the End of the then next Session of Parliament, an Act of the Tenth Year of His late Majesty's Reign, for providing for the Government of His Majesty's Settlements in Western Australia on the Western Coast of New Holland.
- Citation: 5 & 6 Will. 4. c. 14
- Territorial extent: United Kingdom

Dates
- Royal assent: 3 July 1835
- Commencement: 3 July 1835
- Expired: 31 December 1836 (Note: Section 1.)
- Repealed: 18 July 1874
Other legislation
Amends	Government of Western Australia Act 1829
Repealed by	Statute Law Revision Act 1874

Status: Repealed

Text of statute as originally enacted

Western Australia Government Act 1836
- Act of Parliament
- Parliament of the United Kingdom
- Long title: An Act to continue until the Thirty-first Pay of December One thousand eight hundred and thirty-eight and from thence to the End of the then next Session of Parliament an Act of the Tenth Year of His late Majesty, for providing for the Government of His Majesty's Settlements in Western Australia, on the Western Coast of New Australia.
- Citation: 6 & 7 Will. 4. c. 68
- Territorial extent: United Kingdom

Dates
- Royal assent: 13 August 1836
- Commencement: 13 August 1836
- Expired: 31 December 1838
- Repealed: 18 July 1874
Other legislation
Amends	Government of Western Australia Act 1829
Repealed by	Statute Law Revision Act 1874

Status: Repealed

Text of statute as originally enacted

Western Australia Government Act 1838
- Act of Parliament
- Parliament of the United Kingdom
- Long title: An Act to continue until the Thirty-first Day of December One thousand eight hundred and forty-one, and from thence to the End of the then next Session of Parliament, an Act of the Tenth Year of His late Majesty King George the Fourth, for providing for the Government of His Majesty's Settlements in Western Australia on the Western Coast of New Holland.
- Citation: 1 & 2 Vict. c. 46
- Territorial extent: United Kingdom

Dates
- Royal assent: 27 July 1838
- Commencement: 27 July 1838
- Expired: 31 December 1841
- Repealed: 7 August 1874
Other legislation
Amends	Government of Western Australia Act 1829
Repealed by	Statute Law Revision Act 1874 (No. 2)

Status: Repealed

Text of statute as originally enacted

Western Australia Government Act 1841
- Act of Parliament
- Parliament of the United Kingdom
- Long title: An Act to continue until the Thirty-first Day of December One thousand eight hundred and forty-two, and until the End of the then next Session of Parliament, an Act of the Tenth Year of King George the Fourth, for providing for the Government of His Majesty's Settlements in Western Australia on the Western Coast of New Holland.
- Citation: 4 & 5 Vict. c. 43
- Territorial extent: United Kingdom

Dates
- Royal assent: 21 June 1841
- Commencement: 21 June 1841
- Expired: 31 December 1842
- Repealed: 7 August 1874
Other legislation
Amends	Government of Western Australia Act 1829
Repealed by	Statute Law Revision Act 1874 (No. 2)

Status: Repealed

Text of statute as originally enacted

Western Australia Government Act 1842
- Act of Parliament
- Parliament of the United Kingdom
- Long title: An Act to continue until the Thirty-first Day of December One thousand eight hundred and forty-four, and to the End of the then next Session of Parliament, an Act of the Tenth Year of King George the Fourth for providing for the Government of His Majesty's Settlements in Western Australia on the Western Coast of New Holland.
- Citation: 5 & 6 Vict. c. 88
- Territorial extent: United Kingdom

Dates
- Royal assent: 5 August 1842
- Commencement: 5 August 1842
- Expired: 31 December 1844
- Repealed: 7 August 1874
Other legislation
Amends	Government of Western Australia Act 1829
Repealed by	Statute Law Revision Act 1874 (No. 2)

Status: Repealed

Text of statute as originally enacted

Western Australia Government Act 1846
- Act of Parliament
- Parliament of the United Kingdom
- Long title: An Act to continue until the Thirty-first Day of December One thousand eight hundred and forty-eight, and to the End of the then next Session of Parliament, an Act of the Tenth Year of King George the Fourth, for providing for the Government of His Majesty's Settlements in Western Australia on the Western Coast of New Holland.
- Citation: 9 & 10 Vict. c. 35
- Territorial extent: United Kingdom

Dates
- Royal assent: 27 July 1846
- Commencement: 27 July 1846
- Expired: 31 December 1848
- Repealed: 11 August 1875
Other legislation
Amends	Government of Western Australia Act 1829
Repealed by	Statute Law Revision Act 1875

Status: Repealed

Text of statute as originally enacted

- 1829: A military outpost was founded at Bunbury.
- 1829: The British Parliament passes the Government of Western Australia Act 1829 (10 Geo. 4. c. 22) on 14 May. It allowed the Crown to appoint three or more people, by Order in Council, to jointly make laws for the colony. All laws were to be laid before Parliament as soon as practically possible after their passing. It was only valid initially for five years.
- 1830: Area around Augusta settled.
- 1830: The first exploration over the Darling Range to search for suitable farming land occurred with the settlement of the Avon Valley and the foundation of the town of York in 1831.
- 1832: The main settlement is officially named Perth, after George Murray's seat in Perthshire, Scotland.
- 1832: First sitting of the Western Australian Legislative Council, consisting of four officials appointed by Stirling to assist him in decision-making.
- 1833: On 5 January, the first newspaper, the Perth Gazette was launched.
- 1833: Relations between the Europeans and Aboriginal people were not always amicable with many intercultural skirmishes. Whadjuk man Midgegooroo was executed by military firing squad, whilst his son Yagan, a senior warrior of the local Aboriginal tribe near the Swan River was killed on 11 July after a bounty was issued for his capture following the murder of a couple of settlers.
- 1834: Pinjarra Massacre (sometimes still called Battle of Pinjarra): This was the worst intercultural conflict, happening on 28 October. Depending on the source, the death toll ranged from 15 to 30 adults and children.
- 1836: settlement in the Toodyay region.
- 1837–1839: George Grey explored the coasts of the North West in 1837 and Gascoyne and Murchison in 1839.
- 1839: another four members, drawn from the ranks of private settlers, were added to the official members of the Legislative Council.
- 1841: Explorer Edward John Eyre arrives in Albany walking across the Nullarbor Plain from the eastern states, with the assistance of Aboriginal guide Wylie. In Wonnerup near Busselton, settler George Layman Sr of Wonnerup House was speared to death by a Wardandi elder.
- 1843: Census recorded the population of Western Australia as 3,842.
- 1844: 15-year-old John Gavin – a child – was the first European legally hanged in the colony, (Note: While the first in the colony, Gavin was not the first European legally hanged in Western Australia. The worst offenders of the Batavia mutiny were hanged on Seal Island, about 80 km (50 mi) off the coast of Western Australia, in 1629.) for the murder of 18-year-old George Pollard.
- 1849: First discovery of gold occurred in the Jimperding-Toodyay area.

=== Convict era ===
While Western Australia was initially a "free settlement", economic problems for settler capitalists led them to seek the transportation of British convicts. Western Australia became a penal colony in 1850.

The Gregory brothers led major exploration expeditions to many parts of the colony, including:

- 1851: Augustus Gregory surveys the Greenough region near Geraldton and that area opens up to farming.
- 1861: Francis Gregory explores the interior of the Nickol Bay region (known later as the Pilbara).

By 1859, all the other Australian colonies had their own parliaments and colonists in Western Australia began pushing for the right to govern themselves. The British Colonial Office opposed this because of the slow rate of growth and the presence of convicts. Petitions asking for some of the positions in the Legislative Council to be filled by elected members were presented to London twice during the 1860s.

By 1868, over 9,000 convicts had been transported to Western Australia on 43 convict ship voyages, outnumbering the 7300 settlers in the colony at the time.

In 1867 John Boyle O'Reilly, a Fenian convict, escaped on a boat to the United States, where he published a novel on the Western Australian penal system. He would provide advice to an 1876 expedition of the Catalpa, which rescued another six Fenian convicts.

=== Expansion 1861–1885 ===
Wool production, usually on large stations, was also the basis of expansion further east and northward.

The first permanent European settlements in the North West (later divided into the Pilbara and Kimberley regions) took place in the mid-1860s, initially at the Harding River, De Grey River and Roebourne (gazetted in 1867). Pearling also came to dominate the North West, initially in Nickol Bay, with a fleet at Tien Tsin Harbor (later renamed Cossack). In the North West, unlike southern Western Australia, the labour force was dominated by Indigenous Australians, often under harsh forms of unfree labour.

In 1870, some members of the Legislative Council were elected for the first time, although only male settlers with significant property could vote and the Governor could still veto the council's decisions.

John Forrest led two major expeditions:

- 1870: retracing Edward John Eyre's land route from Perth to Adelaide, as the route of a telegraph line;
- 1874: leading a party to the watershed of the Murchison River and then eastward into the Central Desert.

In 1872, controversial explorer Peter Egerton Warburton made a journey from Alice Springs to the Western Australian coast.

Ernest Giles twice traversed the Gibson Desert between 1872 and 1876.

During the 1870s, the Murchison and Gascoyne regions were also settled by Europeans.

Other notable events

- 1877: The telegraph from Adelaide to Perth was completed, considerably improving intracontinental communication
- 1883: Durack family settle around the Ord River in the East Kimberley.

=== Gold discoveries, 1885–1900 ===
WA population growth 1829–2010

Until the 1880s the economy of the state was based largely on wool and wheat. A major change in the colony's fortunes occurred in 1885 when gold was discovered and prospectors by the tens of thousands swarmed across the land in a desperate attempt to discover new goldfields.

Western Australia Constitution Act 1890 (Note: Section 8.)
- Act of Parliament
- Parliament of the United Kingdom
- Long title: An Act to enable Her Majesty to assent to a Bill for conferring a Constitution on Western Australia.
- Citation: 53 & 54 Vict. c. 26
- Territorial extent: United Kingdom

Dates
- Royal assent: 25 July 1890
- Commencement: 25 October 1890 (Note: Section 7.)
Other legislation
Amends	Australian Waste Lands Act 1855

Status: Current legislation

Text of statute as originally enacted

In 1887 a new constitution, including proposals for responsible government, was drafted and sent to London by Governor Broome for approval. It was argued that due to the increasing wealth being generated by gold rushes, Western Australia should become a self-governing colony. The Western Australia Constitution Act 1890 (53 & 54 Vict. c. 26 (Imp)) granting self-government was passed by the British Parliament in 1890, implementing the constitution defined in the Constitution Act 1889 (52 Vict. No. 23 (WA)), giving the colony independence from the UK in matters other than foreign policy, defence and "native affairs". The Legislative Council, through the Aborigines Protection Act 1886 (50 Vict. No. 25 (WA)), had established the Aborigines Protection Board. Aboriginal affairs remained under the control of the British government, not the Western Australian one. Governor Broome had earlier warned the British Colonial Office that Western Australians could not to be trusted in matters relating to Aboriginal persons. Section 70 of the constitution stated that £5,000, equivalent to A$787,900 in 2022, or one percent of state revenues, whichever was the greater, was to be allocated to Aboriginal persons for their welfare and advancement. Many settlers resented these clauses, and Western Australia has never honoured this clause to its own constitution. A previous governor, William Robinson, was re-appointed to supervise the change. He travelled by train from Albany to Perth and towns en route lit bonfires and people gathered at railway sidings to celebrate his arrival and the new constitution. His arrival in Perth on 21 October 1890 saw the city decorated with elaborate floral arches spanning the city's main streets and buildings were decked with banners and flags.

There shall be payable to Her Majesty, in every year, out of the Consolidated Revenue Fund the sum of five thousand pounds mentioned in Schedule C. to this Act to be appropriated to the welfare of the aboriginal natives, and expended in providing them with food and clothing when they would otherwise be destitute, in promoting the education of aboriginal children (including half-castes), and in assisting generally to promote the preservation and well-being of the aborigines. The said annual sum shall be issued to the Aborigines Protection Board by the treasurer on warrants under the hand of the Governor, and may be expended by the said Board at their discretion, under the sole control of the Governor, anything in the Aborigines Protection Act, 1886, to the contrary notwithstanding. Provided always, that if and when the gross revenue of the colony shall exceed five hundred thousand pounds in any financial year, an amount equal to one per centum on such gross revenue shall, for the purposes of this section, be substituted for the said sum of five thousand pounds in and for the financial year next ensuing. If in any year the whole of the said annual sum shall not be expended, the unexpended balance thereof shall be retained by the said Board, and expended in the manner and for the purposes aforesaid in any subsequent year. — Section 70, Constitution Act 1889 (WA)

In 1891 the rush to the Murchison goldfields began when Tom Cue discovered gold at the town which now bears his name. In the years that followed dozens of gold towns – Day Dawn, Nannine, Peak Hill, Garden Gully, Dead Finish, Pinnicles, Austin Island and Austin Mainland – flourished only to be abandoned when the seams were exhausted and the gold fever moved on.

The influx of miners from the eastern colonies and from overseas increased the presence of trade unions in Western Australia. The Trades and Labor Council, Perth was established in 1891 and Perth Trades Hall opened (1912). The first edition of the Westralian Worker appeared on 7 September 1900 and was followed shortly afterwards by the opening of the Kalgoorlie Trades Hall, the first such hall in Western Australia. A Trades Hall was opened in Fremantle in 1904.

An influx of people from Victoria, South Australia, and Tasmania led to Australian rules football becoming the dominant football code when several local rugby football clubs switched codes.

John Forrest – the first Premier of Western Australia and its only premier as a colony – clashed with Robinson over section 70. While Forrest had argued that Western Australians should accept section 70 to obtain self-government, by 1892 he was attempting to have it changed. William Traylen argued that,

as our revenue is growing up now, and the natives can scarcely be said to be increasing in numbers, we shall be paying a very undue proportion of our income as a colony for the purpose of supporting the Aboriginal native race.

Section 70 was repealed by the Constitution Act 1889 Amendment Act 1894 (No. 2) (58 Vict. No. 37).

Discoveries at Coolgardie (1892) and Paddy Hannan's discovery at Kalgoorlie (1893) sparked true gold fever. Coolgardie prospered particularly well, becoming the third largest town in the colony after Perth and Fremantle.

Gold inspired a new wave of exploration, including David Carnegie who, in 1896, led an epic expedition that travelled through the deserts north of Coolgardie, through the Gibson and Great Sandy Deserts to Halls Creek in the Kimberley, before returning to Coolgardie.

In the late 19th century there was talk of the gold-rich region around Kalgoorlie seceding from Western Australia, as a colony or state called Auralia. This campaign coincided with the reluctance in Perth regarding Western Australia taking part in Australian Federation. Talk of miners' separation and them taking their wealth elsewhere was seen as a threat to the stability of the colony.

In 1899, Forrest succeeded unilaterally passing the Constitution Acts Amendment Act 1899 (63 Vict. No. 19), taking control of Aboriginal Affairs without approval of the British House of Commons. Many Aboriginal people argue that the 1899 amendment was an illegal usurpation of British government power and one percent of accumulated government revenues should be set aside for Aboriginal welfare, as intended.

Other notable events

- 1887: On 22 April, a cyclone struck the pearling fleet at Eighty Mile Beach near Broome claiming 140 lives. The storm was unexpected, being so late in the season.
- 1889: The Great Southern Railway was opened with subsequent economic growth to the regions along the line. The wheat industry did not really get going until the construction of railways. A railway line had reached Coolgardie (from Perth) by 1896.
- 1895: Kings Park was officially opened on 10 August.
- 1897: As part of the Western Australian Government's attempt to gain control of Aboriginal affairs, the Aborigines Act 1897 (61 Vict. No. 5) abolished the Aborigines Protection Board and established the Aborigines Department.
- 1897: Fremantle Inner Harbour was officially opened after dredging and construction under the supervision of C. Y. O'Connor.

== Federation and consolidation (1901–1929) ==
=== Federation (1901) ===
On 1 January 1901, following a proclamation by Queen Victoria, Western Australia, along with the other five British colonies of New South Wales, Queensland, South Australia, Tasmania and Victoria, formed the federation of the Commonwealth of Australia, of which they each became component states. However, Western Australia was reluctant to join the union, doing so only after they were offered a five-year transitional period on inter-state tariffs and a transcontinental railway line.

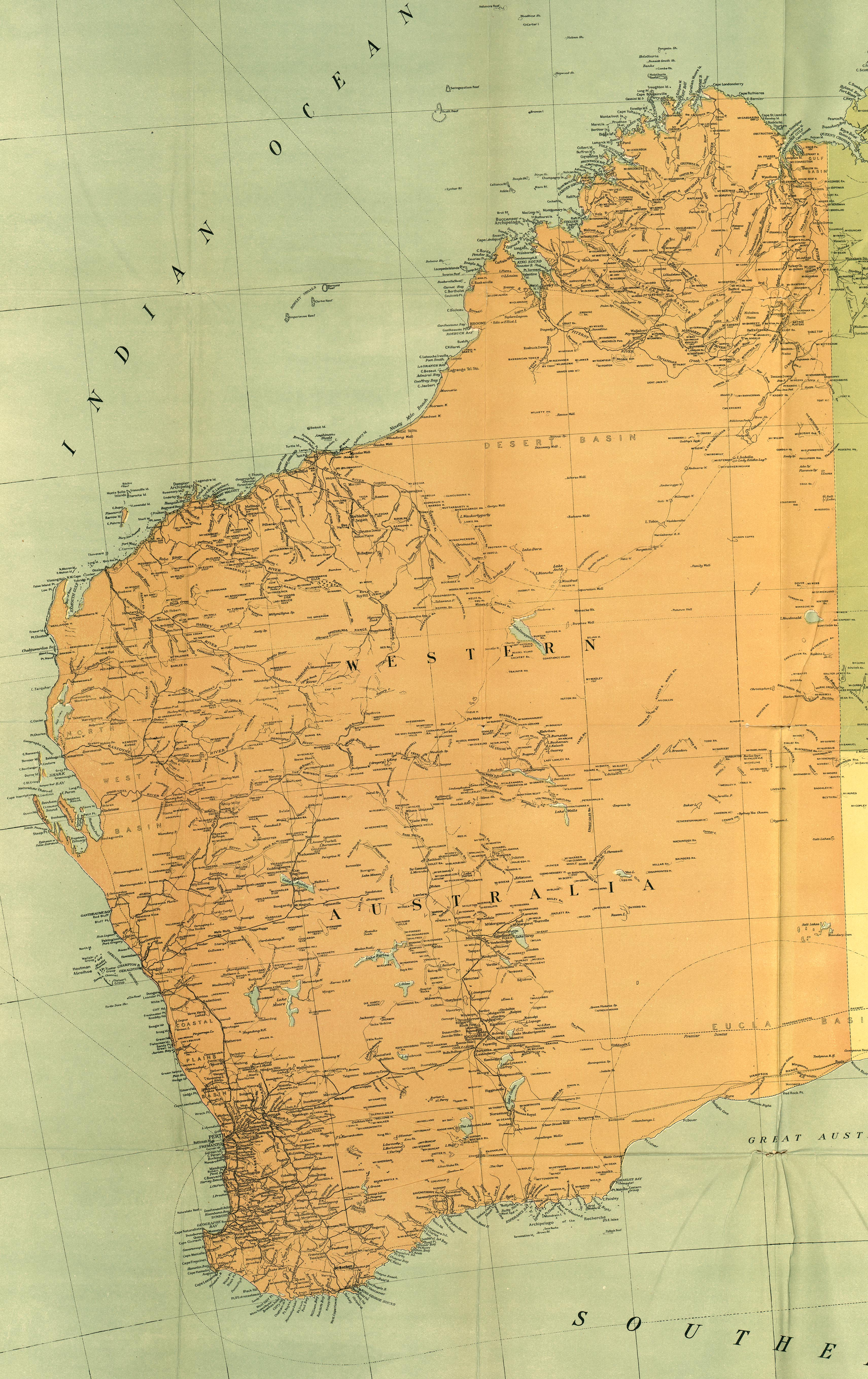
Map of Western Australia in 1916

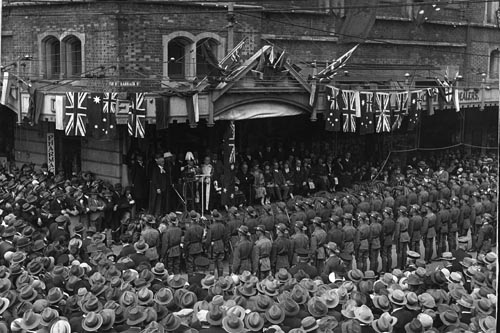
Governor William Campion at the centenary celebrations in Perth

The wealth generated from gold soon disappeared and by the early years of the 20th century, the economy was once again dependent on wool and wheat. This dependency meant that a dramatic fall in wool and wheat prices in the late 1920s, lead into the state's economic collapse during the 1930s. The population's standard of living did reach the same standard until after World War II when the Federal Government's postwar immigration policy saw a huge influx of migrants, nearly all of them from Europe, in the period 1947 to 1970.

Important events in Western Australia included the following:

- 1902: The Premier, George Leake, died suddenly on 24 June aged 45. Frederick Illingworth became the caretaker Premier for a week before Walter James formed a new ministry on 1 July. George Leake is the only Western Australian Premier to die in office.
- 1903: A pipeline from Mundaring Weir to Kalgoorlie is opened. This was a major achievement for its time by the state's first engineer-in-chief C. Y. O'Connor, who committed suicide before the project was complete.
- 1904: John Drayton is imprisoned under parliamentary privilege provisions in Western Australia for refusing to pay a fine. This is the first and, until 1955, only, time that an Australian parliament punished somebody under parliamentary privilege provisions.
- 1911: The University of Western Australia becomes Western Australia's second tertiary institution and first university. No teaching happens until 1913 though. It wasn't until 1975 that Western Australia's second university, Murdoch University opened.
- 1912: A cyclone crossed the coast just west of Balla Balla near Port Hedland and claimed well over 150 lives. This was almost certainly Australia's worst weather-related maritime disaster of the 20th century with the loss of the coastal steamer Koombana.

=== The Great War (1914–1918) ===
- 1916: First of two referendums on overseas conscription in World War I. Western Australia is an outlier in the vote, with 69.7% of voters voting in favour, in contrast to only 48.4% nationwide.
- 1917: Second referendum on overseas conscription in World War I. 64.4% of Western Australian voters vote in favour, while only 46.2% of Australian voters overall do so.
- 1917: The transcontinental railway is complete, fulfilling a promise by the Federal Government when the Colony of Western Australia voted to become a state of Australia at Federation in 1901. Construction of this last leg between Kalgoorlie and Port Augusta had begun in 1912.
- 1920: Edward, the Prince of Wales (the future King Edward VIII) was involved in a train derailment, in which his carriage overturned in the state's south west. The train was moving at a low speed and he did not sustain any injuries.
- 1921: State premier James Mitchell launches the Group Settlement Scheme in the aim of establishing a viable dairy industry in the state's south-west. A 1923 Migration Agreement between the state, the Commonwealth and the British Government committed to settling 6,000 men on 6,000 farms within a five-year period.
- 1920: Western Australia passed legislation allowing women to stand for parliament, Edith Cowan was elected to the Legislative Assembly becoming the first woman elected to any Australian parliament.
- 1928: The Aboriginal deputation to the state premier by brothers William and Edward Harris to protest over injustices experienced by Aboriginal Western Australians.
- 1929: Western Australia Centenary.

== Depression, succession and the Great War (1930–1946) ==
- 1930: Perth is connected to Adelaide (and subsequently the rest of the eastern states) by a telephone line.

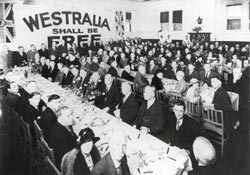
Secessionists at a meeting

- In a referendum in 1933, 68% of voters favoured secession. The Premier, Philip Collier, argued in London for secession but the British decided they could not grant it.
- 1935: The Lacepede Islands near Broome were struck by a cyclone, which sank 21 pearling luggers with 141 lives lost. This was Australia's second deadliest cyclone in the 20th century.
- 1939 – Commencement of compulsory voting in state legislative assembly elections.

== World War II ==
- 1941: Battle between HMAS Sydney and the German raiding ship Kormoran off the coast near Carnarvon. Both ships sank, and the entire crew of 645 onboard Sydney was lost.
- 1942: Japanese planes attack Broome. The official death toll was 88. The settlements of Wyndham, Derby, Port Hedland and the Drysdale River Mission (Kalumburu) also experienced casualties.
- 1942–1945: Japanese occupation of Christmas Island, now one of two Australian Indian Ocean Territories.

== Postwar era (1946–1959) ==
After many years lagging behind other Australian states, the period from 1945 to 1955 was a transformative decade for Western Australia as the state entered a period of rapid industrialization and population growth.

A significant milestone in the industrialisation of the state was the establishment by of a major industrial complex in the City of Kwinana, south of Fremantle. It included oil refineries, port facilities and new housing developments to accommodate the workforce.

- 1946: Over 800 Aboriginal workers took part in the 1946 Pilbara strike, the first such kind of action taken by Indigenous Australians.
- 1947: Western Australia enters the country's domestic cricket competition, the Sheffield Shield. Though Western Australia only entered on a probationary basis, it managed to win the shield in its first season.
- 1950: The worst civil aircraft accident in Australian history occurred when all 29 people on board the Douglas DC-4 Amana died after it crashed near York on a flight from Perth to Adelaide.
- 1952: On 3 October the first nuclear bomb was exploded on Australian soil at the Montebello Islands, located in the north of Western Australia. It was part of Operation Hurricane, Britain's first-ever nuclear weapon test.

== Iron Ore Boom (1960–1972) ==
- February 1961–March 1961: In Western Australia's worst bushfires, many small communities were destroyed including 132 houses in Dwellingup. There were no fatalities, but 800 people were left homeless.
- 1961: Minerals boom begins with the removal of iron ore export ban. The economy is bolstered over the next two decades by nickel mines around Kalgoorlie and iron ore mines in the north-west.
- 1962: Aboriginal people granted full rights to vote.
- 1962: John Glenn passes over Rockingham as part of a NASA manned spaceflight mission Mercury-Atlas 6. Residents of the Perth area had turned on lights in households and businesses to illuminate the city as much as possible. They succeeded, and Glenn referred to Perth as the "City of Light", a nickname he reiterated again when he passed over the city a second time as part of STS-95 in 1998.
- 1964: Serial killer Eric Edgar Cooke was the last person hanged in Western Australia.
- 1964: On 31 December, Donald Campbell broke the world water speed record in the Bluebird K7 on Lake Dumbleyung. He reached 442 km/h (275 mph). Campbell died in the same vehicle in 1967 in a later record attempt in England.
- 1968: On 14 October, the Meckering earthquake occurred with a moment magnitude of 6.5 and a maximum Mercalli intensity of IX (Violent).
- 1968: On 31 December, all 26 people on board MacRobertson Miller Airlines Flight 1750 from Perth to Port Hedland died when the aircraft, a Vickers Viscount, crashed near Port Hedland.
- 1970: The Indian Pacific train completed its first journey by rail across the continent from Sydney to Perth. Though the transcontinental railway had been complete since 1917, this is the first time one train could make the journey uninterrupted by gauge changes.

== 1973–1993 ==
- 1972: Minimum voting age lowered to 18.
- 1974: Change of government. Charles Courts Liberal-Country Party coalition defeats the Labor government.
- 1979: The NASA space station Skylab crashed in the remote south eastern part of the state. Places like Rawlinna and Balladonia received international attention.
- 1979: On 2 June 1979 there was a significant earthquake just east of Cadoux that was felt in Perth.
- 1979: WAY 79 and the publishing of the Sesquicentenary Celebrations Series (Western Australia) by the celebrations committee and Government.
- 1980: Government closes the Fremantle Line and replaces the services with buses. The closure galvanises public opposition and becomes a major campaign issue in the 1983 election resulting in a change of government under Brian Burke.
- 1981: Discovery of the Gorgon gas deposit.
- 1983: Beginnings of WA Inc. Government deals with private businessmen lead to the loss of $600 million in public money.
- 1984: The Parliament of Western Australia abolished the death penalty, the last state in Australia to eradicate capital punishment.
- 19 November 1990: Labor Premier Carmen Lawrence initiates a Royal Commission into state government dealings with private businesses. The findings of the commission led to the conviction and imprisonment of two previous Premiers—Brian Burke and Ray O'Connor.
- 1993: The Joondalup railway line is completed to extend rail transport to Perth's northern suburbs.

== Economic boom (1994–present) ==
- 1993: Change of government. Labor loses to the Richard Court Liberal-National coalition Government.
- 1996: The Liberal-National coalition loses control of the Upper House with the balance of power shifting to minority parties.
- 1997: Western Australian parliament issues a formal apology to the stolen generation.
- 2001: Change of government with Geoff Gallop's Labor government defeating the coalition on the back of an anti-old growth logging platform.
- 2001: The worst fire involving toxic waste in Western Australia occurred at a Bellevue solvent recycling plant after an explosion set over 500,000 litres (130,000 US gal) of chemical waste alight, causing severe contamination.
- December 2007: The Mandurah railway line opens.
- 2008: Change of government with the election of the Barnett Government.
- 2008: The historic ban on uranium mining reversed.
- 2016: Elizabeth Quay, a mixed-use development project in the Perth central business district opens.
- 2017: Change of government with Mark McGowan leading Labor to a landslide victory over the coalition.
- 2020: Western Australia closes its borders to all states of Australia to stop the spread of COVID-19.
- 2020: Clive Palmer sues Western Australia repeatedly for the closed borders.
- 2021: Mark McGowan wins state election with another landslide, said to be caused by his strong border policy.

== See also ==
- Historical Records of Australia
- History of Australia
