= Secessionism in Western Australia =

Pro-independence sentiment and movement

Flag of the "Dominion of Westralia" as proposed in 1934

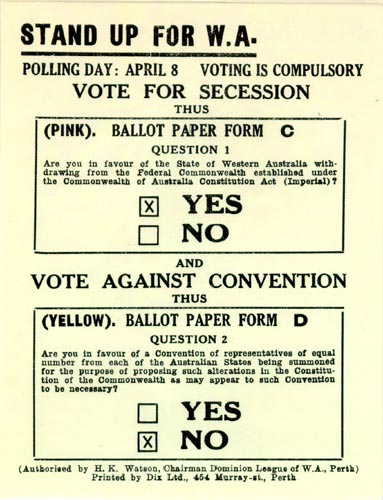
Secessionist how-to-vote card, 1933

Secessionism has been a recurring feature of Western Australia's political landscape since shortly after Federation in 1901. (Note: Five years after federation, the Western Australian Legislative Assembly resolved that federation had "proved detrimental to the interest" of the state. It called for a referendum to withdraw from the Commonwealth be put to voters in the state. However, neither the Premier nor the Opposition Leader supported the move. No further action was taken at the time.) The idea of self-governance or secession has often been discussed through local newspaper articles and editorials. On a number of occasions secession has been a serious political issue for the state, including in a successful but unimplemented 1933 state referendum.

Part of the appeal of an independent Western Australia (WA) derives from its geographical uniqueness: it is the world's second-largest administrative division by area, behind only the Sakha Republic in Russia; and Perth, WA's only large metropolitan area, is often referred to as the world's most isolated metropolis, situated more than 2,000 kilometres (1,200 mi) away from the nearest large city (Adelaide in South Australia). Australia's largest deserts, including the Great Victoria Desert and the Great Sandy Desert, provide a natural barrier between Western Australia and the more populous eastern states of Australia. Although they are connected by the Eyre Highway, this includes a 1,200-kilometre (750 mi) stretch of road between Norseman, Western Australia and Ceduna, South Australia that is virtually uninhabited.

One recurring argument by proponents of secession is based on the assumption that a federal government in Canberra will favour the business and popular interests of the larger population centres lying to the east of this state. A common complaint is that Western Australia is a forgotten or Cinderella state, which contributes more to federal funds than it gets back, and is discriminated against by the more populous states. The Constitution of Australia, however, describes the union as "one indissoluble Federal Commonwealth" and makes no provision for states to secede. (Note: However Section 128 does provide for the alteration of the Constitution) Western Australia is the only state not specifically listed in this preamble, as its final decision to join came too late for the constitution, already enacted by the UK Parliament, to be altered.

== Colonial self-government ==
Petitions asking for representative elections for some of the positions in the Western Australian Legislative Council were presented to London in 1865 and 1869. This was granted in 1870 but maintained a Governor's veto.

In 1887 a new constitution including the right of self-governance was drafted and in 1890, the Act granting self-government was passed by the British House of Commons and assented to by Queen Victoria.

== "Auralia" goldfields separation movement ==
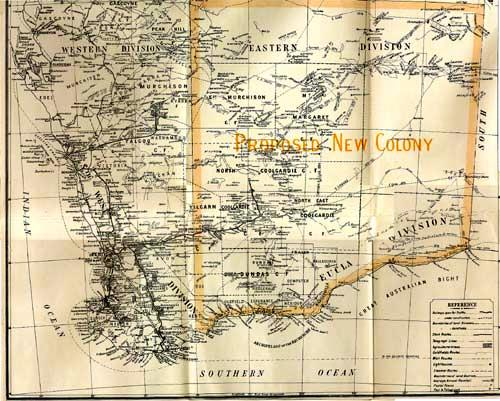
A map printed in 1900, to accompany a petition to Queen Victoria, showing the boundaries of the proposed "Colony of Auralia"

During the late 19th century, the WA government (like that of New Zealand) was reluctant to commit to the proposed Federation of British colonies in Australasia, and was lobbied by Federation committees from WA and the other colonies. This changed little with the granting of self-government to WA in 1889 – and the election of the Colony's first Premier John Forrest – which meant virtual independence from Britain, in all matters except defence, foreign affairs and trade. After the discovery of gold at Coolgardie (1892) and Kalgoorlie (1893), these towns were at the centre of the "Eastern Goldfields", and the flow of immigrants from the Eastern Colonies increased.

Tensions emerged during the mid-1890s between the Goldfields and the capital city. There were four main reasons for this:

- the extremely rapid growth of the Goldfields meant that its population soon rivalled that of the Perth metropolitan area;
- before the opening of the Perth-Kalgoorlie railway and Fremantle Harbour (both in 1897), Goldfields residents interacted relatively little with the metropolitan area (i.e. people moving from the Eastern Colonies to the Goldfields usually passed through the deep water port of Albany, took trains to Broomehill and then travelled by horse or on foot along Holland's Track to Coolgardie);
- Forrest's government favoured large mining companies over individual prospectors, antagonising many people in the Goldfields and;
- many Goldfields residents, due to their ties with the Eastern Colonies, strongly supported Federation.

In 1899, after several years of lobbying, the Eastern Goldfields Reform League compiled a Petition to Her Majesty the Queen from persons residing on the Goldfields, together with a refutation of the statements made in the petition, by Sir John Forrest. It argued the case for the Goldfields' separation from Western Australia and the formation of a new Colony/State in the Goldfields, named "Auralia". In early 1900, Walter Griffiths travelled to London on behalf of the Eastern Goldfields Reform League executive, to present the petition to the British government and lobby the Colonial Office to either approve Auralia's separation, or force Western Australia to accept Federation. However, in spite of many requests by Griffiths, the Colonial Secretary, Joseph Chamberlain refused to meet him.

Nevertheless, the petition put pressure for the Western Australian government to join Federation. Forrest led a push to include recent immigrants from the east on the electoral roll, ensuring that the referendum would pass. From 1 January 1901, when WA formally joined the other Colonies in federating as States of the Commonwealth of Australia, the impetus for creation of Auralia waned.

== Federation ==
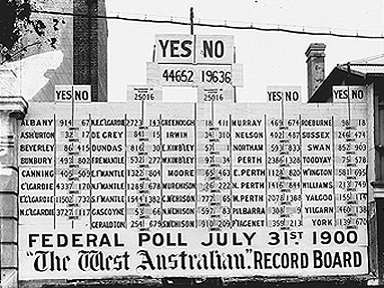
Record board of the West Australian showing results for the Popular Referendum on Australian Federation, 31 July 1900

In 1900, Western Australians voted in a referendum to consider the draft Australian Constitution of the proposed Federation of Australia. The result of the vote was 44,800 in favour and 19,691 against. Most country electorates voted "No", except Albany and the Goldfields, which voted "Yes".

The Constitution, which came into force on 1 January 1901 states in its opening preamble:

WHEREAS the people of New South Wales, Victoria, South Australia, Queensland, and Tasmania, humbly relying on the blessing of Almighty God, have agreed to unite in one indissoluble (Note: Underlining added here for emphasis. The text is not underlined in the original.) Federal Commonwealth under the Crown of the United Kingdom of Great Britain and Ireland, and under the Constitution hereby established. And whereas it is expedient to provide for the admission into the Commonwealth of other Australasian Colonies and possessions of the Queen ...

Western Australia is not named in the preamble unlike the other states (New South Wales, Victoria, South Australia, Queensland, and Tasmania), as its support was given too late for the document to be amended prior to enactment. The colony had taken no steps to hold their referendum on the question of federation as the year 1900 began. As a result, there were protests and moves within the colony to join the federation by other means. For example, residents of the Eastern Goldfields began organising to form a colony separate from Western Australia. This would have allowed them to seek admission to the Commonwealth later. Finally, Western Australia's referendum was held on 31 July 1900. By that time the British Parliament had enacted the Commonwealth Constitution Bill. It had received Royal Assent on 9 July 1900.

== Post-Federation secessionism ==
Secessionist sentiment emerged in the first years after Western Australia entered into the Federation. Despite the special provisions for Western Australia included in section 95 of the constitution, the protectionist policies of the new Barton government dismayed Western Australian business interests who saw that increased tariffs on imported machinery would negatively affect the local mining and agricultural industries. In 1902, state MP Patrick Stone put forward a motion calling for secession and for Western Australia to "have the same control over its finances and other important matters as was enjoyed before the union". In the same year Perth's Daily News declared that federation had been "a mistake from a financial point of view".

In 1904, the Senate voted to defer a money bill for the surveying of the Trans-Australian Railway, which had been a key inducement for Western Australia to enter the Federation. In response, Albert Wilson moved an unsuccessful motion for secession in the Legislative Assembly and state premier Hector Rason suggested that he would hold a referendum to leave the Federation if the railway was not constructed. In 1906, a pro-secession motion introduced by Frederick Monger passed both houses of parliament and requested the state government call a referendum. However, Rason's successor as premier Newton Moore chose not to introduce legislation for a referendum. Monger's motion "marked the high point of secessionism in WA until the emergence of a large-scale movement for secession in the early 1930s".

== 1933 referendum ==
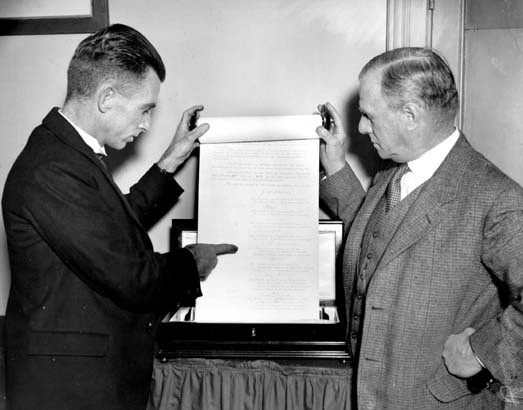
Keith Watson (left) and James MacCallum Smith (right), showing a page of the 1933 secession petition

James MacCallum Smith, the proprietor of the local weekly newspaper, The Sunday Times started publishing pro-secessionist articles in 1907 under its editor Alfred T. Chandler. In 1926, Smith, a committed secessionist, and others established the Secession League to provide a public vehicle for advancing the secession cause. Prior to the Great Depression in 1930, the State's major export had been wheat. However, with the depression, wheat prices plummeted and unemployment in Perth reached 30%, creating economic havoc. Also in 1930, Keith Watson founded the Dominion League which advocated secession and the creation of a separate Dominion of Western Australia. The league held numerous rallies and public meetings which successfully made capital out of the general discontent brought on by the depression. Smith continued to agitate until the mid-1930s when a syndicate of main nationalists purchased the paper's parent company.

The term Westralia was regularly associated with secessionism.

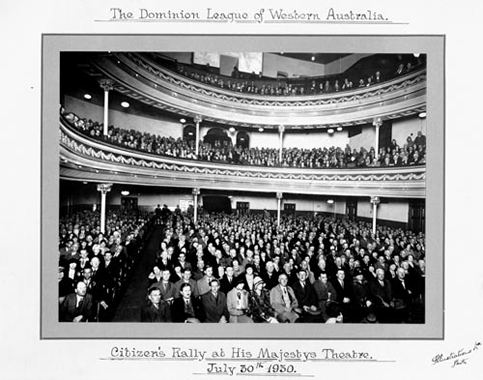
Public launch of the Dominion League at His Majesty's Theatre, Perth on 30 July 1930

To counter the pro-secession movement, a Federal League of Western Australia was formed which organised a "No" campaign. They brought several high-profile people to Western Australia including the Prime Minister Joseph Lyons, Senator George Pearce, and former Prime Minister Billy Hughes for a brief speaking tour of Perth, Fremantle and country centres, but often received hostile receptions. The Federalists argued for a constitutional convention to examine the state's grievances but was unable to counter the grassroots campaign of the Dominion League. The question of holding a constitutional convention was the second question asked in the referendum.

On 8 April 1933, Nationalist Premier Sir James Mitchell's government held a referendum on secession alongside the State parliamentary election. The Nationalists had campaigned in favour of secession while the Labor party had campaigned against breaking from the Federation. 68% of the 237,198 voters voted in favour of secession, but at the same time the Nationalists were voted out of office. Only the mining areas, populated by keen Federalists, voted against the move.

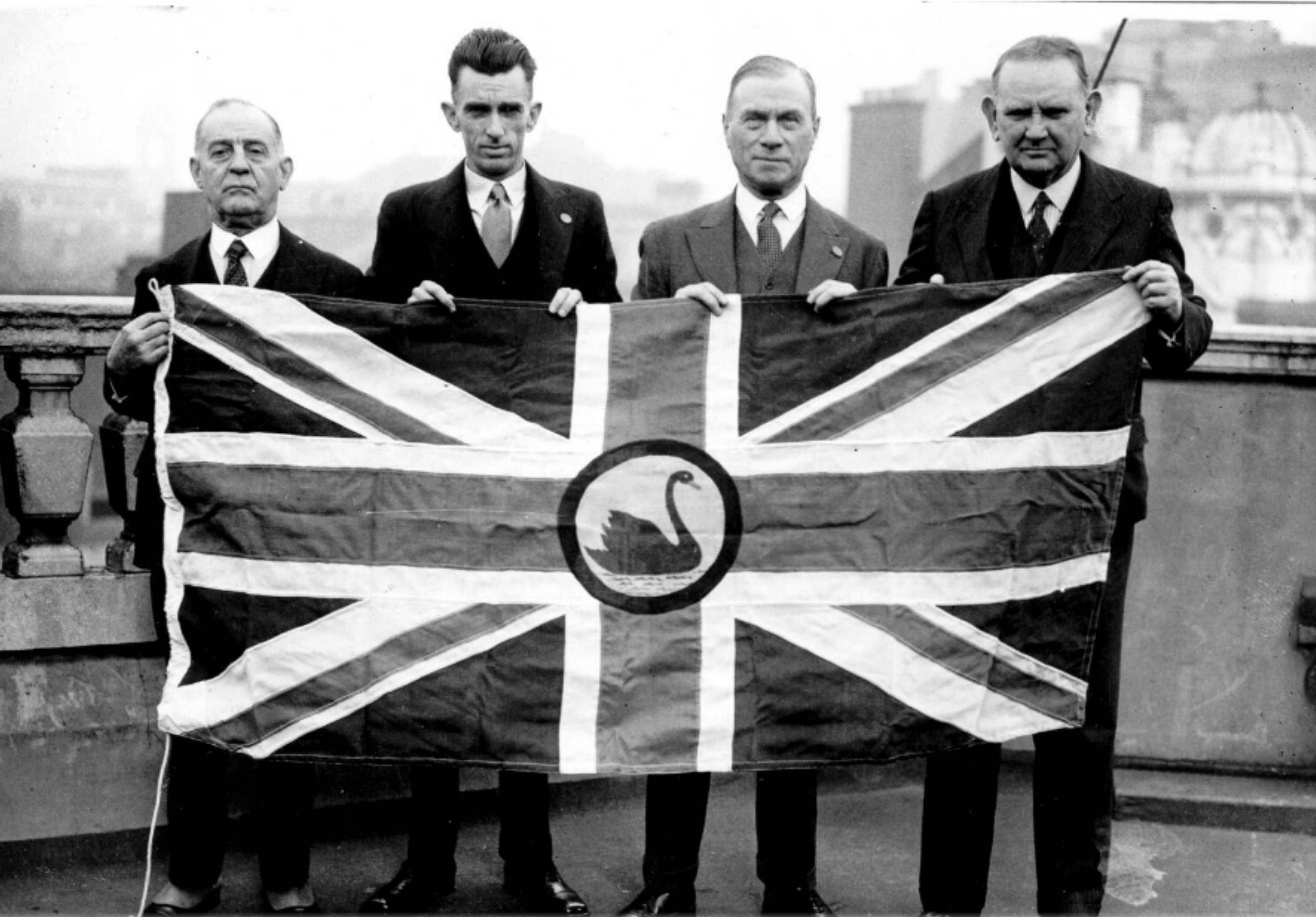
The delegation for the secession of Western Australia in London

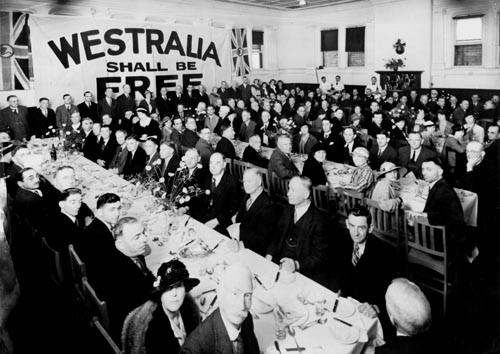
A Dominion League meeting in 1933

The new Labor government of Philip Collier sent a delegation to London with the referendum result to petition the British government to effectively overturn the previous Act of Parliament which had allowed for the creation of the Australian Federation. The delegation included the Agent General, Sir Hal Colebatch, Matthew Lewis Moss, James MacCallum Smith, and Keith Watson. They argued as follows:

Our opponents lay great stress on the words contained in the preamble to the Commonwealth of Australia Constitution Act:

Have agreed to unite in one indissoluble Federal Commonwealth under the Crown of the United Kingdom of Great Britain and Ireland and under the Constitution hereby established.

They emphasise the word "indissoluble". We insist on the equal importance of the rest of the section: "Under the Crown" and "under this Constitution". Will it be contended that if – a highly improbable suggestion – the always loyal Commonwealth of Australia decided to break away from the British Crown and establish a republic, we in Western Australia should still be bound in the "indissoluble Federal Commonwealth?

Our contention is that the words "under the Constitution hereby established" are of equal significance, and if we can demonstrate – as we are prepared to do – that in a number of essentials, the Constitution has been violated to our detriment, we are entitled to be relieved from our bargain. The federation is a partnership between six States in which certain guarantees were given and certain safeguards were provided. We can show that these guarantees have been violated – that these safeguards have been swept aside – and so we ask for the annulment of the partnership.

After all, what does the word "indissoluble" mean? Remember that it occurs only in the preamble and not in the Act itself. Is any arrangement made in this world indissoluble? Can the rulers of any country "dressed in a little brief authority", bind the people of that country not merely to the third and fourth generation, but for all time? Is there either justice or common sense in continuing an agreement that is working badly? Is a party to that agreement – after giving it a trial for 35 years and having proved it to be hampering to its industries, destructive to its prosperity and a grave bar to its development – prohibited from seeking relief?

The United Kingdom House of Commons established a select committee to consider the issue but after 18 months of negotiations and lobbying, it finally refused to consider the matter, further declaring that it could not legally grant secession. The delegation returned home empty-handed.

As a consequence of the failure of negotiations and of the economic revival, the Secession League gradually lost support and by 1938 had ceased to exist.

== 1974 Westralian Secession Movement ==
Iron ore magnate Lang Hancock founded the Westralian Secession Movement in 1974. His group focused largely on taxes and tariffs, arguing that trade barriers around Australia harmed the State's mainly mining and wheat export industries which earned a disproportionate amount of Australia's foreign exchange. In the 1974 Senate election, the party fielded Don Thomas as an ultimately unsuccessful candidate.

The Western Australian economy was, however, in an upswing at the time with major capital works underway and prosperity at an all-time high. The movement stagnated after a few years.

== Recent history ==
Western Australia's shares of various resources in 2010
	% of Australian total
Population	10.3%
Gross domestic product	13.1%
Mineral and energy output	48%
Merchandise exports	39%
Exploration	55%
Private investment	28%
Share of GST	8.1%

At the start of the 21st century, Australia was in the middle of a "resources boom", which once again meant that Western Australia's economic contribution to the Australian economy was at a high point. Perceptions of a disproportionately low share of federal resources sent to the state relative to its economic contribution to the country further fanned a wave of secessionist rhetoric. For example, at the 22 October 2008 Vista Public Lecture, former Western Australian Premier, Richard Court, said that the case for secessionism only strengthened while the Commonwealth continued to exploit the state's resource-rich economy. He argued that, at the time, Western Australia accounted for 35% of the nation's export income yet most of the revenue was used to strengthen the "financial muscle growing in Canberra". The state had approximately 9–10% of the nation's population, generated over 10% of the Goods and Services Tax revenue, but received only 6% of what was being distributed. Court said that if the then-current Federation path continued, then by the year 2020, Western Australia would only be receiving 5% of what would be distributed by the Commonwealth Grants Commission. The former Premier said he was not advocating secession but stressed that the financial imbalance required addressing and that "the time to do so is now".

In July 2011, the Western Australian Minister for Mines and Petroleum, Norman Moore, made the controversial statement that WA should secede and rely primarily on China for military defence to remain an independent nation free from Canberra's influence. Members of the Liberal Party responded to his comments negatively, stating that they were his personal view and not the stance of the Liberal Party.

Western Australia was grouped with Scotland, Wales, the Basque Country, and Catalonia as "places seeking maximum fiscal and policy autonomy from their national capitals" in an October 2013 opinion piece in The New York Times.

In 2016, the pro-secessionist WAxit Party was formed. The party failed to gain a significant number of votes in subsequent elections.

Discussions in Parliament, and a successful motion at the 2017 Liberal Party State Conference, sparked renewed debate of secessionism in the media. Support for WA secession grew again during the COVID-19 pandemic and WA's hard border closure with the rest of Australia in 2020. A poll run in October 2020 found that 28% of Western Australians support Western Australia leaving the Australian federation.

== See also ==
- Secessionism in Tasmania
- Proposals for new Australian states
- Principality of Hutt River
