= List of Australian capital cities =

There are eight capital cities in Australia, each of which functions as the seat of government for its state or territory. One of these, Canberra, is also the national capital. Section 125 of the Constitution of Australia specified that the seat of the national government, that is, the national capital, would be in its own territory within New South Wales, at least 100 miles (161 km) from Sydney. The Constitution specified that until this national capital was ready, the Parliament would sit in Melbourne. In 1927, the national capital was finally ready and the national government relocated from its former seat in Melbourne to Canberra within the Australian Capital Territory (or the Federal Capital Territory as it was known at the time).

In each state and internal territory, the capital is also the jurisdiction's most populous city. The Australian external territory of Norfolk Island has its official capital at Kingston, although this acts merely as the administrative centre of government; its de facto capital is Burnt Pine.

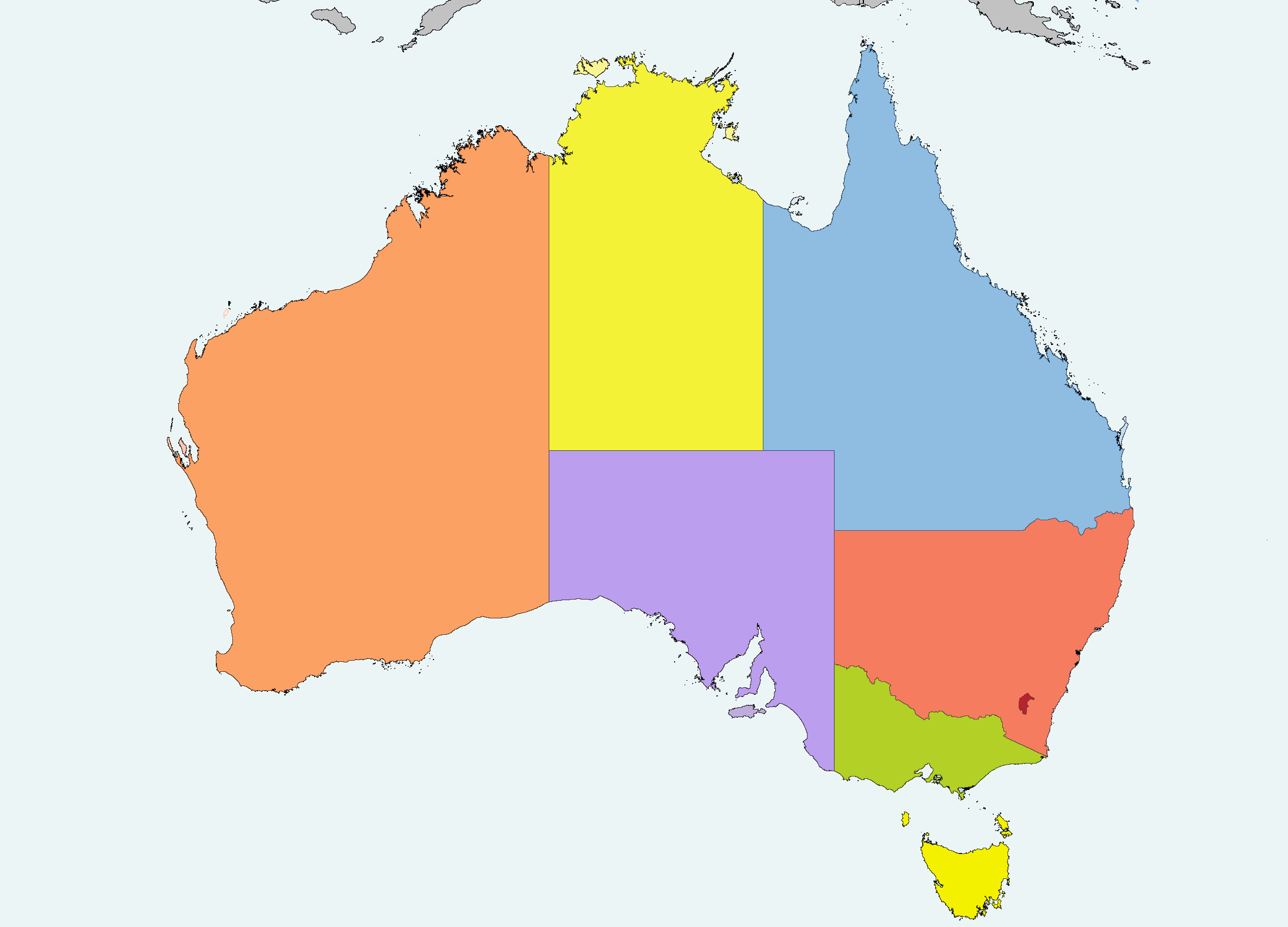

State and territory capitals of Australia
State/territory	Capital	City population	State/territory population	Percentage of state/territory population in capital city	Established	Capital since	Image
New South Wales	Sydney	5,029,768	7,759,274	64.82%	1788	1788	
Victoria	Melbourne	4,725,316	6,179,249	76.47%	1835	1851	
Queensland	Brisbane	2,360,241	4,848,877	48.68%	1825	1860	
Western Australia	Perth	2,022,044	2,558,951	79.02%	1829	1829	
South Australia	Adelaide	1,324,279	1,713,054	77.31%	1836	1836	View of Adelaide CBD
Tasmania	Hobart	224,462	517,588	43.37%	1804	1826	
Australian Capital Territory	Canberra	403,468	403,468	100.00%	1913	1913	
Northern Territory	Darwin	145,916	245,740	59.38%	1869	1911	
