= Australian regional rivalries =

Australian regional rivalries refers to the rivalries between Australian cities, states and territories or regions.

== State rivalries ==
=== Melbourne–Sydney rivalry ===
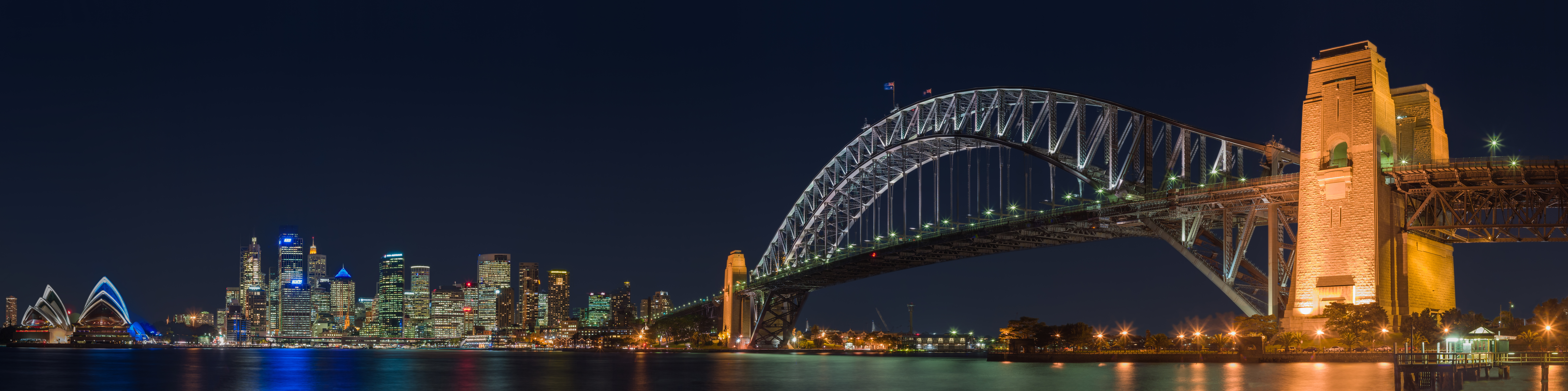
Sydney, New South Wales

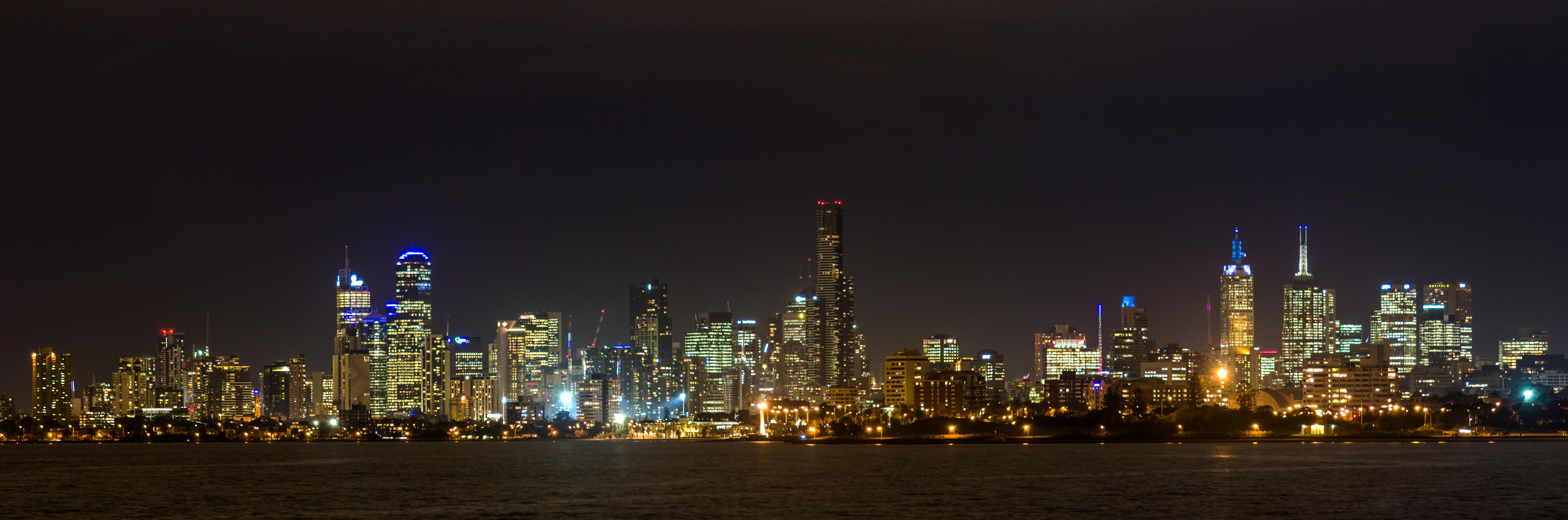
Melbourne, Victoria

There has been a long-standing rivalry between the cities of Melbourne and Sydney, the two largest cities in Australia – 39.9% of Australia's total population live in either Greater Sydney or Greater Melbourne. The rivalry between the cities was the reason that neither Melbourne (the largest city at the time, and again the largest city by contiguous urban area in 2023) nor Sydney (the oldest city) was chosen as the capital of Australia when the nation was federated in 1901. The rivalry was so fierce that neither city would accept the other as the capital. Due to this disagreement, section 125 of the Australian Constitution specified that Melbourne would initially serve as the seat of government on a temporary basis, while the permanent capital of the new Commonwealth must be located within New South Wales but at least 100 miles from Sydney. This city became Canberra. Melbourne operated as the seat of parliament from 1901 until 1927, when Canberra's historic Parliament House was opened, remaining in use until it was replaced with the current Parliament House in 1988. Various Commonwealth governmental bodies continued to operate principally from Sydney or Melbourne after 1927. Most civil service departments were moved to Canberra in the 1950s, and the High Court of Australia was finally moved from Melbourne to Canberra in 1980.

Rivalry and differences between the colonies were features of life in pre-federation Australia. There was a real rivalry between the most powerful colonies, New South Wales and Victoria, on trade matters. Each believed that the new nation should follow their trade model. New South Wales had a policy of free trade where all goods coming that came into the state were not subject to tariffs. Victoria had an opposite policy of protectionism with tariffs imposed on goods coming into the state from other colonies. This rivalry delayed the process of federation; eventually the two colonies agreed that trade between the colonies would be tariff free, but tariffs would be placed on goods from overseas (excluding the British Empire).

The Melbourne-Sydney Rivalry is heavily represented in sport. Sydneysiders first adopted Rugby football and started the professional NRL competition and the Australian Rugby League Commission, while Melburnians invented Australian rules football and started the professional AFL competition. While both sports have extended their popularity beyond their own state, the historic and spiritual centre of both sports has remained in Sydney and Melbourne respectively, and neither city has been quick to embrace the other city's dominant football code. However, there is a strong rivalry between each city's biggest A-League teams, Sydney FC and Melbourne Victory FC, with matches between the two sides known as "The Big Blue". Finally, there is also a growing rivalry between the ANZ Championship netball teams the New South Wales Swifts (previously Sydney Swifts) and Melbourne Vixens (previously Melbourne Phoenix). Also, there is a rivalry between the Sydney Kings and Melbourne United in Basketball (NBL).

Sydney, with a population of 5.23 million, is the largest city in Australia, and has been named the world's best city eight consecutive times by Condé Nast Traveler. Melbourne is the second largest city in Australia with a population of 4.94 million, and has been named seven consecutive times world's most liveable city by The Economist. It has been called the sporting capital of Australia. While Sydney was overtaken by Melbourne in terms of domestic tourism income in 2007, Sydney still remains the leading tourism destination for international tourists.

Founded 47 years after Sydney, Melbourne was established by free settlers, and the colony of Victoria never possessed any convict settlements; however, Sydney's original founding was based upon convicts and was the first British settlement in Australia. Today Sydney still maintains the most historic settlement site in Australia, called 'The Rocks'. Melbourne transformed rapidly thanks to the Victorian gold rush in the 1850s, and became Australia's largest and most important city by 1865. This golden age, referred to as 'Marvellous Melbourne', was crushed by the Australian banking crisis of 1893 and resulting depression, and Sydney overtook Melbourne as the largest Australian city in the early 20th century. Sydney's infrastructure development is hampered by its challenging geography. By 2020, current trends indicated Melbourne would become the most populous city in Australia by 2026.

=== New South Wales–Queensland rivalry ===
Australian population as a percentage, 1881–2000

The rivalry between the states of New South Wales and Queensland has gone on since the Separation of Queensland in 1859.

This rivalry has been played out through sport over the years. There was a strong push for representative football matches between the two colonies which led to the first matches in 20 August 1884 (in Australian rules football) resulting in a draw however New South Wales quickly became dominant. Such was the power of the rivalry that when the newly formed Northern Rugby Union scheduled annual matches in 1886 which Queensland won resoundingly that the entire colony switched to Rugby union from the following year. Likewise when the Queensland Rugby League formed, the 1908 Interstate rugby league series becoming an annual contest and quickly resulted in rugby league becoming dominant football code in the state. In Queensland, there has been a general ill-feeling over the number of sports people leaving their home state for New South Wales, particularly rugby league footballers who left to play for the richer Sydney clubs. These players would then play against Queensland in interstate matches. In 1980, as a solution to this problem, the State of Origin series was created to allow Queensland players to play for their original state, and an immediate stop was put to New South Wales' dominance at the time. This sporting contest played three times a year now exemplifies this rivalry, dominating the media and public attention in both states during the series.

=== South Australia–Victoria rivalry ===
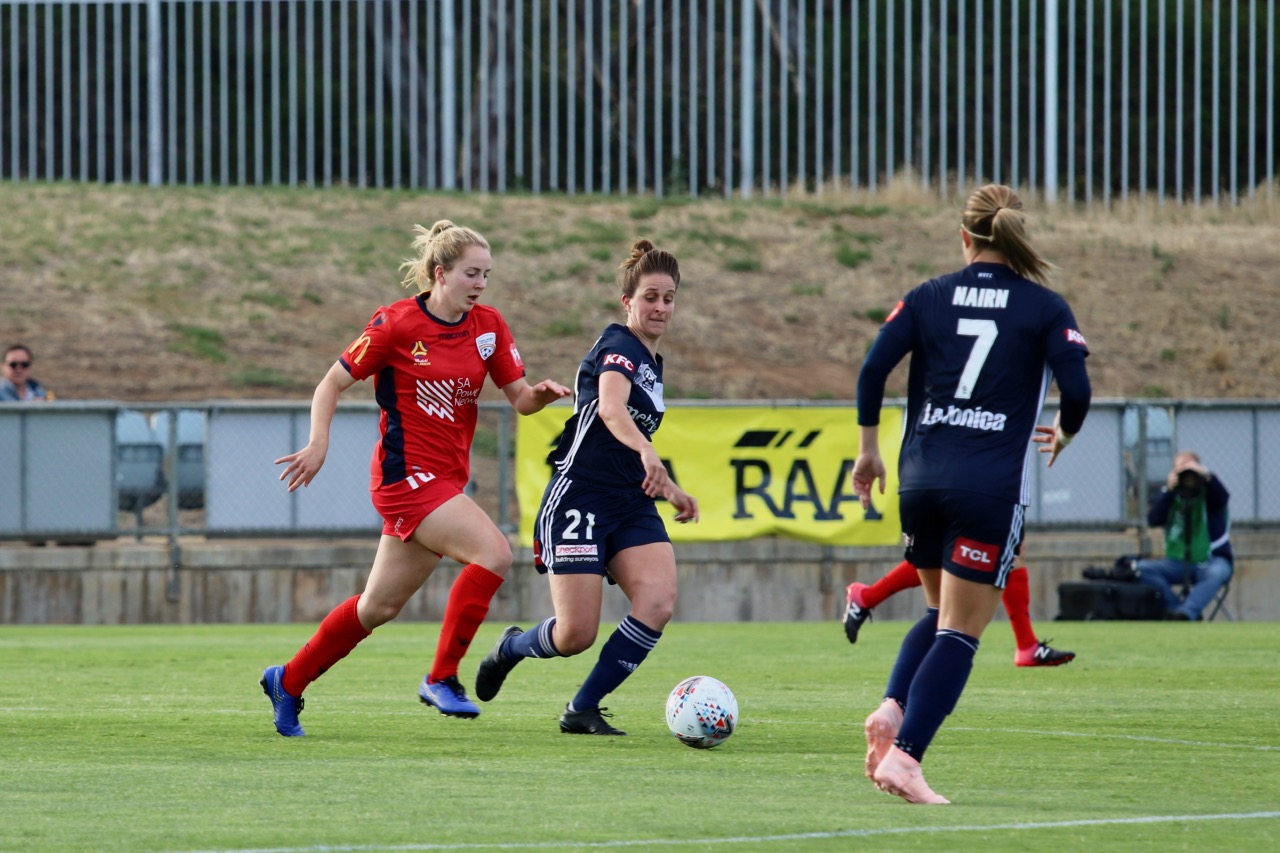
Adelaide United vs Melbourne Victory

Much of the rivalry is played out in sport, primarily Australian rules football, and the dish chicken parmigiana. South Australians and most of the country call the dish a "parmi". Victorians; however, call it a "parma". There is not a united stance on parma in Victoria. The use of parmi/parma has led to some heated Twitter debates most recently involving former Fremantle captain Matthew Pavlich and Adelaide-born Collingwood coach Nathan Buckley. Back to AFL, and the very first interstate match was held between the two states in 1879. "Kick a Vic" became the later South Australian catchcry in State of Origin football. South Australians became bitter when the AFL canned the State of Origin series, which has increased with the reluctance to allow South Australia to once again compete. There are even some South Australians who dispute the Victorian origin of Australian Rules and claim that the game is a South Australian invention, pointing to an earliest recorded football match which was played in South Australia in 1840, nearly two decades before the first rules of the game were written, although historians later argued that this early match was instead the Irish game of caid.

Nevertheless, Australian rules in South Australia was the first to form a true governing body and the SANFL remains the oldest league in the game (founded as the SAFA just over two weeks before the VFA in early 1877). Many SANFL supporters resent the expansion of the VFL to become the Australian Football League, and in particular, the poaching of players from South Australia before the first teams from Adelaide were admitted into the competition. Many South Australian supporters also resent the Melbourne-based AFL for not recognising its history and low representation in the official Australian Football Hall of Fame. Port Adelaide Football Club's bid to defect to the AFL in 1990 was seen as a major scandal and an act of betrayal by South Australians. Many of the club's supporters resent being forced to drop its jumper design and record number of premierships to change leagues upon its final admission in 1997. Another source of this rivalry goes back to how these states were settled. Neither state was formed as a penal colony, however South Australia was self-governing, freely settled state (as opposed to a crown-colony). Because of this it received many of its settlers from Germany and Austria and German was the de facto second language in South Australia until the First World War. Early Victoria settlers, on the other hand, were almost entirely English or Gaelic speakers from Great Britain and Ireland. As a result of South Australia's early German connection, a feeling of resentment was held towards the state during the First World War, a feeling which still exists, albeit on a much less intense level, today.

There is also a quite intense rivalry in the A-League between Adelaide United FC and Melbourne Victory. This match is known as the 'Original Rivalry' due to it being one of the first rivalries in the A-League. Some notable instances between these two teams was in the 2006-07 season where the then-Adelaide coach John Kosmina grabbed Victory skipper Kevin Muscat by the throat after the ball rolled out near the Reds technical area, Kosmina went to pick up the ball, only to be pushed to the ground by Muscat trying to retrieve the ball himself. later that season Victory would beat Adelaide 6-0 in the 2007 A-League Grand Final with Archie Thompson scoring 5 goals. Melbourne Victory would also beat Adelaide United to win the 2008-09 regular season because they had scored more goals than Adelaide after having equal points and goal difference. This was also followed up by Melbourne Victory beating Adelaide United 1-0 in the 2009 A-League Grand Final. As of 16 July 2024, Melbourne Victory have won 32 games, drew 16 games and Adelaide United have won 24 games in this matchup.

=== Western Australia and other states ===
Western Australia has the largest land area of any state of Australia, encompassing a third of the continent. It is the least densely populated and the furthest removed from the Eastern States centres of population and from the federal government's home in the Australian Capital Territory. The state has the fourth largest population of the Australian States and Territories with 9.8% of the national total, and about one-third the population of Victoria and New South Wales. Some Western Australian towns are located closer to its South-East Asian neighbours to the North than to cities interstate; the capital Perth is closer to Jakarta than to Sydney or Melbourne. At the same time, it has abundant natural resources and primary industries that contribute a significant part of Australia's economy, particularly in the mining sector. As at June 2006 it contributed 11.7% of the Gross State Product. There is a belief that too much of the wealth of Western Australia is lost to the federal system and redistributed among the Eastern States. Only 6% of the total goods and services tax (GST) allocations to the states and territories is distributed to Western Australia. Many Western Australians believe they are actually subsidising and paying for the other states, which they derisively call "poor states."

Some Western Australians consider their state to be a "forgotten" Cinderella State. Often sporting and concert events bypass the state for financial reasons because of its isolation. Western Australians have long complained of being ignored an/or taken advantage of by the other states and the Commonwealth over political and economical issues. In regards to sport, most animosity is directed to Victoria, whose more powerful Victorian Football League evolved into a national league rechristened as the Australian Football League to the detriment to the WAFL and South Australia's SANFL. It was Western Australia who came up with the State of Origin football concept that was so successful in the 1980s and continues to be in the rugby league version.

Western Australia is the most successful cricketing state behind New South Wales yet the state team only debuted in the interstate Sheffield Shield in 1947, 55 years after the other colonies started. WA was only allowed to enter the competition after agreeing to pay the other states. Ill feeling because of the unfair financial burden was somewhat soothed by WA winning the shield in their first season. Such unfair financial conditions were also put onto the ill-conceived Western Reds in the Australian Rugby League. The club was forced to pay for the accommodation and airfares of visiting teams along with their own when they were the greatest travelling club in the league. Though the club performed solidly on the field, financial conditions caused it to fold at the end of 1997. The club's licence and the core of the playing group moved to Melbourne where that new club won the premiership in its second season.

Western Australia was the last British colony to agree to join the federation. As a result, the state is not mentioned in the preamble to the Commonwealth of Australia Constitution Act (1900) as its support was given too late for the document to be redrafted. On several occasions, secessionism has been seriously proposed and was even formally pursued in a 1933 referendum which received 68% popular support. It took no effect because a British parliamentary committee decided the secession referendum was invalid because it didn’t have the support of the Australian parliament.

== Regional rivalries ==
=== Illawarra and other parts of New South Wales ===
The Illawarra region of New South Wales lies only a short distance south of Sydney; however, the socioeconomic and ethnic backgrounds of its citizens has allowed for the development of bitter rivalries between the Illawarra and Sydney, the Illawarra and Newcastle, and the Illawarra and Far South Coast.

The Illawarra vs. Sydney Rivalry is founded in historical, political and, for many, personal aspects. The Illawarra northern suburbs centred on Thirroul and Corrimal have seen drastic development resulting from overpopulation in the Sydney Cumberland Basin with many local residents upset about being encroached upon by the metropolis.

This same reason was one of the reasons for the 1885 Charcoal Creek riots (now Unanderra), when 18 homes built by migrants from Sydney were demolished and razed by angry Illawarrian farmers who claimed they were built illegally by "ignorant city siders who don't know our country." The desire of Illawarrians to show differences between themselves and Sydneysiders has shown itself many times. In the early days of the Iraq War, Wollongong Lord Mayor Alex Darling led a delegation to the Consul General of France asking them to accept Wollongong's defection to France in protest at Sydney (and Canberra's) stance.

In 1915, when the Commonwealth was looking for a port for Canberra, the Illawarra shires unanimously volunteered to become part of the territory, however the state government in Sydney refused to allow it because it would be too close to Sydney's ports and far too competitive. Jervis Bay was eventually made the site, however territorial separatism is still felt in the region today. Illawarra politicians are often very supportive of new states movements elsewhere in the state, including New England, Riverina and Bogong states movements, however no current Illawarra new state movement is known to exist.

The Newcastle vs. Wollongong rivalries exist mainly due to the history of each city, to their similar populations, to both being steel towns, and also to their similar distances from Sydney.

=== Melbourne: North vs. South of the River ===
Though this has become less apparent in recent years, there is a historic rivalry between the two sides of the Yarra River in the Metropolitan Melbourne Area. Traditionally, the Northern and Western suburbs (which lay on the north/right bank of the Yarra River) were industrial, working-class and a major destination for immigrants to Melbourne, whilst the Eastern and Southern suburbs (which lay on the south/left bank of the Yarra River) were by the bay, more affluent and received less immigration. In recent years, due to the gentrification of inner city suburbs (such as Brunswick and Footscray) and the incorporation of multicultural, working class, outer suburbs (such as Melton and Pakenham) into the Greater Melbourne region, and significant immigration to Eastern and Southern suburbs in recent decades, this divide has become less pronounced than it historically was.

=== Ballarat–Bendigo rivalry ===
The cities of Ballarat and Bendigo in Victoria have an ongoing rivalry which dates back to the Victorian Gold Rush. Throughout the 19th and 20th centuries the two cities have been of almost identical size in terms of population and commercial importance, as well as claims to being the 'capital' of the Goldfields region of Victoria. Ballarat has remained slightly ahead in population terms, although growth rates between the two cities have fluctuated.

The population figure for the local government area of the City of Greater Bendigo (which includes sizeable nearby towns) is larger, and therefore often cited by Bendigonians in favour of their city. Bendigo remains the larger financial centre and Bendigonians also claim the warmer climate. Bendigo also claimed superior gold production. Both Ballarat and Bendigo have used their history and architectural heritage as major tourist drawcards and directly vie for the tourist dollar. In tourism Ballarat has traditionally drawn more visitors due to its geographic position and also to the presence of popular Sovereign Hill, a re-creation of 1850s Ballarat town and mines. Ballarat was also the site of the 1854 Eureka rebellion, when armed miners and government troops fought over the miners' demands for fairer tax and license laws. Visitors are also drawn to the attractions related to the rebellion.

The modern Ballarat vs. Bendigo rivalry extends to sport with Australian rules and basketball teams from each town having notable contests drawing interest from the media and spectators.

=== Latrobe Valley ===
Long standing rivalries between towns and cities in the Latrobe Valley that make Latrobe City go back to the 1880s, particularly between similarly sized Morwell and Traralgon and to a lesser extent Moe. Latrobe City is a fairly rare case of an urban area formed incrementally from multiple similarly sized cities without a single central core. Both Morwell and Traralgon continue to claim the civic centre and most dominant in the region and the municipality City of Latrobe was partly formed to settle rivalries between the cities. This rivalry extends to sports, particularly local Australian rules football matches and also soccer.

=== Cairns–Townsville rivalry ===
There has been a long-standing rivalry between the North Queensland cities of Cairns and Townsville. This is partly due to the similar size of the two cities, distance and slightly different local cultures. Both cities have sought to be known as the capital of the region, the major population centre and port. Cairns is considered the aviation, agricultural & tourism hub of North Queensland whilst Townsville is the administrative, financial and industrial hub.

Each city is home to a national sports team, the North Queensland Cowboys located in Townsville, and the Cairns Taipans. Because of the inter-city rivalry it generally takes longer for these teams to win the hearts and minds of potential supporters in the rival city, although the North Queensland Cowboys have found it easier than the Taipans, since Townsville previously had an NBL team (The Townsville Crocodiles who folded at the end of the 2015-16 Season), whilst the Cowboys more broadly represented Northern Queensland, it is unclear whether the name was a nod to The Region, or the entirety of North Queensland (Including Far North Queensland)

=== Tasmania: North vs. South ===
The North and South rivalry generally follows the historical division of the state along the 42nd parallel. This division was formalised between 1804 and 1812 when the Northern county was known as Cornwall and the Southern county was Buckinghamshire. The population of Tasmania is nearly evenly split between the North and the South. The North–South rivalry manifests in various ways such as preference of beer; Cascade in the South vs. Boags in the North, and which newspaper is more widely read, The Mercury in the South vs. The Examiner in the North. It is a longstanding battle between the two areas, and the mayors of Launceston and Hobart symbolically "buried the hatchet" in 1959. However, the current mayors dug the hatchets back up in 2012 whilst dressed in full pirate regalia.

The divide has extended to the state's maximum security Risdon Prison, where northern and southern inmates are being separated.

The north–south divide was referenced in an episode of Australian comedy TV series Utopia.

Cartoonist Christopher Downes makes light of the rivalry in the cartoon The Great Divide for the newspaper of the Southern division, The Mercury.

Facebook cartographer Simon Bags recently created this map to document the division of beer drinking in Tasmania. Some controversy exists over the exact boundaries of the red and blue section of this map.

From time to time this North vs. South issue is used by media outlets as a way of increasing readership. This is sometimes framed up as exploring the potential to divide the state again, as in this piece from the ABC: "Tasmania was once (figuratively) split in two, could it happen again?" It concludes Tasmania will not become states due to over-representation in the Australian Government.

== See also ==
- Twin towns and sister cities
- Proposals for new Australian states
