= Auralia =

Proposed colony in Australia

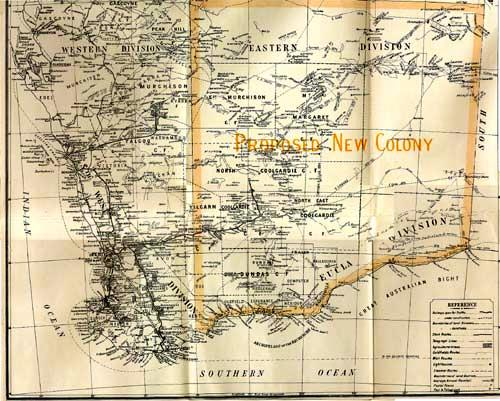
Map showing the proposed boundaries of Auralia

Auralia was a proposed colony that would have been formed out of the south-eastern portion of the colony of Western Australia in the early twentieth century, and would have joined the newly formed Commonwealth of Australia.

The name, meaning 'golden' in Latin, denotes the gold industries that were alive at the time and which helped foment the ideas of secession.

The proposed colony would have comprised the Goldfields, the western portion of the Nullarbor Plain and the port town of Esperance. Its capital would have been Kalgoorlie.

The push to secession was prompted by perceptions that the Western Australian colony under Sir John Forrest was parochial, self-serving and evasive towards federating the colony with the emerging Commonwealth. Many inhabitants in the goldfields had come to Western Australia from the other colonies in the previous decade when Kalgoorlie experienced a gold rush and their loyalties were thus not usually directed towards Perth.

Sir John Forrest's efforts to secure concessions before fully supporting federation was alienating these new arrivals.

Eventually the proposal was dropped when Western Australia joined the federation in 1901.

The name Auralia was used by a journalist writing in the Coolgardie Miner after federation, and before the First World War.

In the 1933 secession referendum, the Goldfields was the only region of Western Australia to be against secession, instead arguing for a constitutional convention.

== See also ==
- Secessionism in Western Australia
