= Economy of Western Australia =

Economic systems of Western Australia

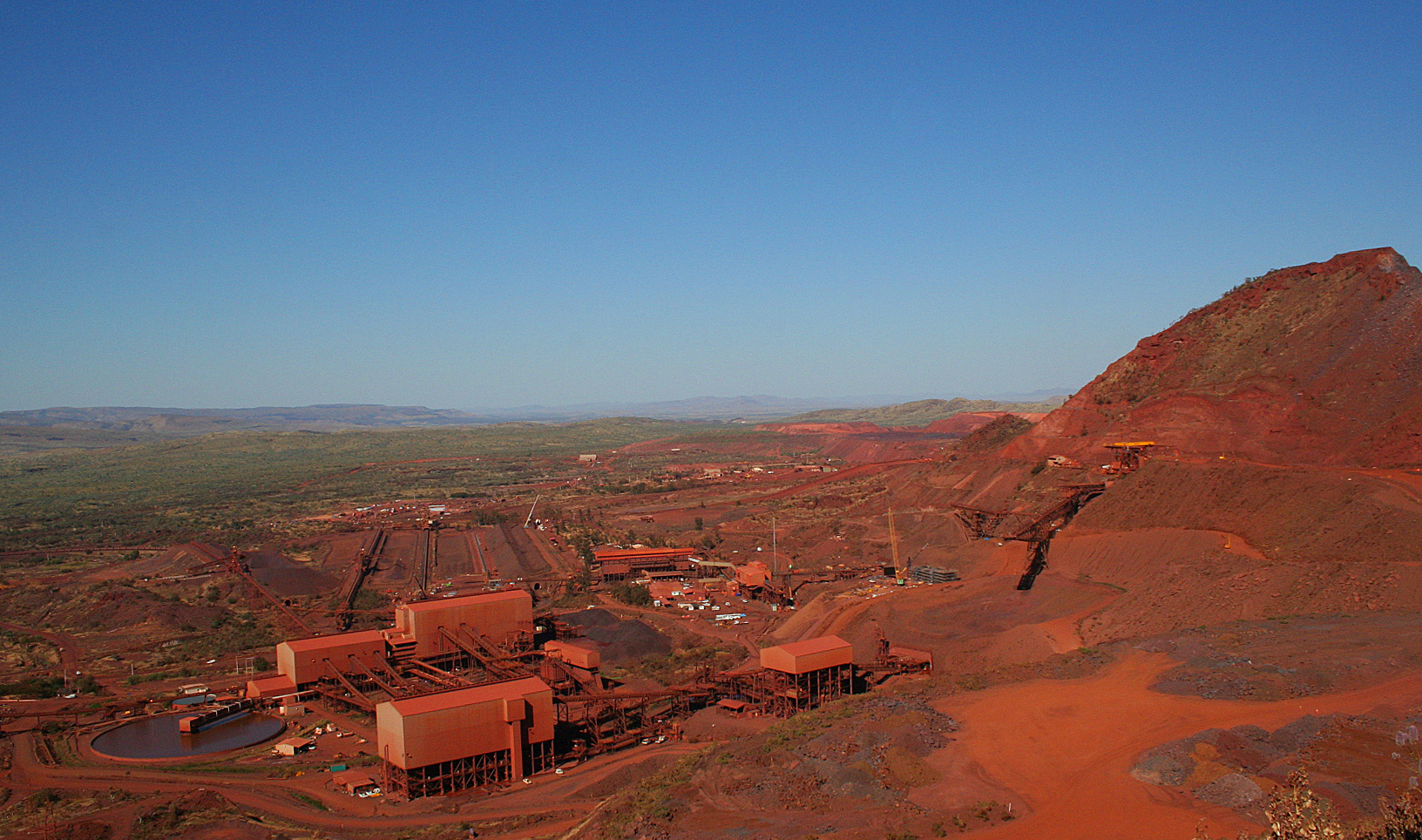
- Mount Tom Price mine: Iron-ore is the state's leading export commodity.
- Currency: Australian dollar

Statistics
- All values, unless otherwise stated, are in US dollars.

The Western Australian economy is a state economy dominated by its resources and services sector and largely driven by the export of iron-ore, gold, liquefied natural gas and agricultural commodities such as wheat. Covering an area of 2.5 million km^{2}, the state is Australia's largest, accounting for almost one-third of the continent. Western Australia is the nation's fourth most populous state, with 2.6 million inhabitants (11% of the national population).

In 2011, Western Australia provided 46% of Australia's merchandising exports. In 2018-19, Western Australia's gross state product was A$260.6 billion (17.5% of Australia's GDP), making it the nation's most productive state, and one of the most wealthy places on earth with a GDP per capita of A$135,479 (compared with the national average of A$74,605). In 2018-19, Western Australia exported A$147.1 billion worth of goods and imported A$34.1 billion, creating a trade surplus of A$112.95 billion. This is in contrast to the national trade deficit of A$70.5 billion.

== Structure ==
=== Overview ===
Western Australia's economy is largely driven by extraction and processing of a diverse range of mineral and petroleum commodities. The structure of the economy is closely linked to the abundance of natural resources found in the State, providing a comparative advantage in resource extraction and processing. As a consequence:

- The Western Australian economy is more capital-intensive than all the other states.
- Gross state product per person ($82,653) is higher than any other state and well above the national average ($57,925).
- Diversification (i.e. a greater range of commodities) over the past 15 years has provided a more balanced production base and less reliance on just a few major export markets, insulating the economy from fluctuations in world prices (e.g. high oil and gas prices help sustain export income when prices of other commodities such as alumina and nickel fall)
- There has been strong growth in the services (finance, insurance and property) and construction sector, which have increased their share of economic output.
- Recent growth in global demand for minerals and petroleum, especially in China (iron-ore) and Japan (for LNG), has ensured economic growth above the national average.

Western Australia's overseas merchandising exports accounted for 46% of the nation's total. The state's major export commodities include iron-ore, alumina, crude oil and liquefied natural gas (LNG), nickel, gold, ammonia, wheat, wool, and live sheep and cattle. Western Australia has become known as the engine room of the Australian economy.

=== Resources ===
Western Australia's resource commodity mix, 2007

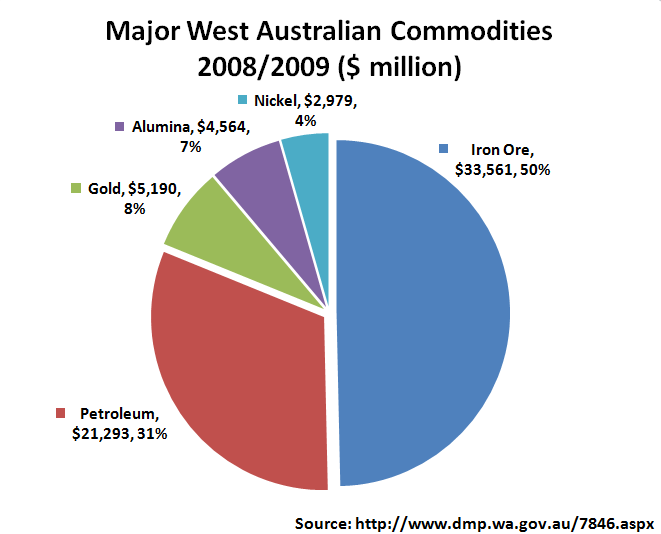
Major commodity mix, 2008–2009

In global terms, Western Australia is a significant producer of a wide range of resource commodities. Australia is the world's largest producer of both bauxite and alumina, with half of national production coming from Western Australia. Alcoa's Huntly mine provides the feedstock for its three refineries at Wagerup, Pinjarra and Kwinana. Worsley Alumina transports bauxite from its Boddington mine to its refinery at Worsley via a 51 km conveyor belt. It is the world's third-largest iron-ore producer (15% of the world's total) and extracts 75% of Australia's 240 tonnes of gold. Diamonds were extracted at Argyle diamond mine in far north of the Kimberley region before it ceased operations in 2020. Coal mined at Collie is the main fuel for baseload electricity generation in the state's south-west. Australia is the world's fifth largest exporter of LNG, most of which is produced by the North West Shelf Venture near Karratha.

Resource sector growth in recent years has resulted in significant labour and skills shortages, leading to recent efforts by the state government to encourage interstate and overseas immigration. According to the Feb 2012 statistical data, the average full-time adult weekly income was A$1,617.90 in Western Australia (compared to A$1,406.80 in Australia as a whole). Recent growth has also contributed to significant rises in average property values in 2006, although values plateaued in 2007. Perth property prices are still the second highest in Australia behind Sydney, and high rental prices continue to be a problem. A lot of this has to do with the mining industry being so strong in WA.

=== Agriculture ===
Agricultural production in WA is a major contributor to the state and national economy. Although tending to be highly seasonal, 2006-07 wheat production in WA was nearly 10 million tonnes, accounting for almost half the nation's total. and providing $1.7 billion in export income. Other significant farm output includes barley, peas, wool, lamb and beef. There is a high level of overseas demand for imports of live animals from WA, driven mainly by South East Asia's feedlots and Middle Eastern countries, where cultural and religious traditions and a lack of storage and refrigeration facilities favour live animals over imports of processed meat. Approximately 50% of Australia's live cattle exports come from Western Australia. The state maintains the list of, and imposes particular handling requirements for, declared weeds here. Despite also being a crop, this includes Opuntia ficus-indica.

==== Wine ====
Western Australia has major wine producing regions in the South West located in Margaret River, the Great Southern and the Swan Valley. Several wineries produce wine for local consumption and international export.

==== Fishing ====
Western Australia has a significant fishing industry. Products for local consumption and export include Western Rock Lobsters, prawns, crabs, shark and tuna. Processing is conducted along the west coast. Whaling ceased at Albany in 1978.

=== Manufacturing ===
South of Perth is the heavy industrial area of Kwinana. Located here is the nation's largest oil refinery which produces petrol and diesel for local consumption, an iron plant, alumina and nickel processing, port facilities for grain exports, and support industries for mining and petroleum such as heavy and light engineering, and metal fabrication. Shipbuilding (e.g. Austal and Civmec) and associated support industries are found at nearby Henderson, just south of Fremantle. Significant secondary industries include cement and building product manufacturing, flour milling, food processing, animal feed production, fertilizer production, automotive body building, brewing and printing.

=== Tourism ===
In recent years, tourism has grown in importance, with significant numbers of visitors to the state coming from the UK (27.8%), other European countries (13.6%) Singapore (16.5%), Japan (10.1%) and Malaysia (8.3%). Tourists from China increased 50% between 2011 and 2012, from 22,000 to 33,000. Revenue from tourism is a strong economic driver in many of the smaller population centres outside of Perth, especially in coastal locations.

Total international visitors to WA is currently increasing above the national average - for the year ending June 2011 there were 735,900 international visitors, a growth of 5.3% for WA compared to a growth of 3.4% nationally. They spent in total A$1.94 billion, up 9.4% from the previous year. against a national average growth rate of 4.3%. In addition, nights stayed by international visitors was up 5.6% (+3.8% nationally), with a 22% increase in international business visitors (121,400 people). The largest spike in international visitors came from Indonesia (+26.4%), USA (+23.0%), New Zealand (+19.9%) and Malaysia (+15.5%). The biggest decreases in visitor numbers to Western Australia by country was Korea (-25.7%), South Africa (-21.1%), Netherlands (-17,9%) and Canada (-14%). .

Overall Western Australia had an estimated 7,000,000 overnight visitors to the State for the year ending December 2012, with 5,160,000 coming from intrastate, 1,112,000 from interstate, and 760,800 from overseas, making Western Australia's tourism industry worth approximately A$6 billion in total.

== Economic history ==
=== Foundation (1829 to 1850) ===
The British Government founded the Swan River Colony in 1829 with the intention of establishing the colony with an agricultural and pastoral base. The poor quality land—particularly in the region in close proximity of the coast—and an inadequate labour supply and infrastructure hindered the expansion of the economy.

=== Convictism and the gold boom (1850 to 1913) ===
The Swan River colony was not intended to be a penal colony but, in 1848, the introduction of convicts from Britain was sought to provide much needed labour and income from the British government. These were to be males, so an immigration program was also funded to redress gender imbalance. Prior to this, population and the economy had stagnated. By 1870 the European population had tripled and was reaching 20 000, around half of these were convicts. This allowed the establishment of smaller industries and reduced the reliance on imports. The new labour pool was utilised in new Public Works. The colony began attaining a greater level of financial independence.

The discovery of gold in this period also increased the population. Migration from the eastern states, where a post gold rush economic slump existed, and from overseas increased sharply. While much of the revenue generated was retained by the British crown, some was directed toward creating infrastructure in the state. New towns, Coolgardie and Kalgoorlie, were established at the goldfields and the remote northern town of Roebourne and its port Cossack were boosted by the associated economic boom. The city of Perth and the port of Fremantle, Western Australia were also invigorated by the new economy.

=== World Wars and Depression (1913 to 1946) ===
The First World War (1914–1918) had a disruptive impact on economic development. Wartime conditions ensured high prices for agricultural products, but also created inflationary pressures and manpower shortages, while the completion of the transcontinental rail link in 1917 highlighted growing integration into the national economy and a decline in dependence on Britain.

In 1919 the state government sought to resume economic growth through the introduction of soldier-settlement in the south-west region. However, initial enthusiasm waned in the face of concerns about the feasibility of the proposed program, while Labour unrest raised concerns about the ability of the state government to manage this program. Undeterred the Nationalist government of James Mitchell pressed ahead. Indeed, Mitchell's enthusiasm was such that his critics soon dubbed him "Moo-Cow" Mitchell. Unfortunately soldier-settlement soon ran into problems, cost the state over £5 million, and led to the defeat of the Mitchell government at the polls in 1924.

Given the economic importance of agriculture and the debts incurred in the 1920s it was not surprising that the Great Depression had a major impact on WA. Falling prices for agricultural goods hit farming areas hard leading to a further fall in demand, rising unemployment and much hardship. It was only after the Labor government of Philip Collier accepted the Premier's Plan and agricultural prices began to rise that the economy recovered. Even so, unemployment in WA did not fall below 10% until the outbreak of war in 1939.

World War II had a much more dramatic impact on the economy than the previous war. It immediately stimulated industry and agriculture effectively ending the Depression. After the introduction of manpower controls and conscription a severe manpower shortage developed that would continue into the 1950s. During the war the Labor governments of John Willcock and Frank Wise actively promoted industrial growth in the industrial areas of Midland and Welshpool, and was effective in mobilising the population to support the war effort. In addition port facilities in Fremantle and the air transport facilities in Perth were expanded to cope with wartime needs. To balance these developments the attacks of the Imperial Japanese Forces on the north of Western Australia caused much of the existing economic infrastructure of towns like Wyndham, Derby and Port Hedland to be destroyed.

=== Post-war era (1946 to present) ===
The post-war period saw sustained growth in the Western Australia economy. Successful economic development ultimately culminated in the Australian Grants Commission removing its designation of WA as a "claimant" state in 1971. By the early 21st century WA was no longer regarded as a "Cinderella State" within the Australian Commonwealth, but the centre of the mining and pastoral industries, and the hub of the export boom.

During the immediate post-war period WA greatly benefited from the rapid expansion of federal involvement in the economy. The establishment of Trans Australia Airlines (TAA), the nationalisation of Qantas, and setting up of a national shipping line ensured that transport links with the other states were greatly strengthened. The launching of a mass migration program in 1946 under the slogan of "populate or perish" eased manpower shortages, and boosted the WA population. The federal housing agreement of 1947 allowed the state government to proceed with a program of public housing construction and expansion which saw the Perth metropolitan area double in size between 1945 and 1960. Finally the success of the government of Ross McLarty in attracting foreign investment culminated in the signing of an agreement with BP to establish an oil refinery at the new industrial area of Kwinana (south of Fremantle).

The lifting of the federal ban on the export of iron-ore in 1960 further boosted the economy. Rapidly increasing industrial and mining production fueled the rise of suburbanisation and consumerism in Perth and regional centres in the 1960s and 1970s. The Liberal governments of David Brand and Charles Court encouraged these developments. Foreign investment and the increase in the tax base was also used to modernise existing infrastructure. In the 1960s a metropolitan freeway system was constructed to link South Perth and Fremantle with the rapidly growing northern suburbs of Perth. Suburban shopping centres were built in Floreat, Morley, Forrestfield and Midland. A new container port facility was built in North Fremantle, Perth Airport was re-built and progressively the tram-trolley bus network was closed down.

In contrast to the economic development goals of successive Liberal governments, the Labor administrations of Albert Hawke, John Tonkin and Brian Burke focused more on the development of education and social services infrastructure. In particular the Hawke government commenced a mass expansion of the state high school system, while the Tonkin government funded the opening of a second state university in 1973–74. The development of regional centres was also encouraged as government funding was directed towards the upgrading of the port of Cockburn, the Stirling Naval base and the mining communities of Newman and Meekatharra.

Much of the economic development in the 1960s and 1970s was sponsored by Japanese investors, especially in the iron-ore sector, while American and British investment remained centred in the pastoral, agricultural and construction sectors. From the 1990s China emerged as a major market for WA goods and as a potential investor. State and federal government of major public works continued despite some evidence of local maladministration during the "WA Inc" years of the late 1980s. Thus the early years of the 21st century saw the completion of the Ord River Project in the north-west and the rapid expansion of the Perth metropolitan rail and freeway networks.

In 2003, the State Government launched a Buy WA First campaign to support the State's economy.

== See also ==
- Australian economy
- Petroleum in Western Australia
- Mining in Western Australia
- Secessionism in Western Australia
- Timeline of banking in Western Australia
- Rail transport in Western Australia
