= Eastern states of Australia =

States adjoining the east continental coastline of Australia

Coordinates: 27°S 146°E

The eastern Australian states. States in red are always defined as eastern. The term can sometimes be applied to the states in orange

The eastern states of Australia are the states adjoining the east continental coastline of Australia. These are the mainland states of Victoria, New South Wales and Queensland, and the island state of Tasmania. The Australian Capital Territory and Jervis Bay Territory, while not states, are also included. On some occasions, the southern state of South Australia is also included in this grouping due to its economic ties with the eastern states.

Regardless of which definition is used, the eastern states include the great majority of the Australian population. They contain the federal capital Canberra and Australia's three largest cities Sydney, Melbourne and Brisbane (all capitals of the respective east coast states). Of the 19 Australian cities with populations over 100,000 in 2021, 16 were located in the eastern states under the restricted definition (17 if including South Australia), which includes the two non-capital cities with a population over 500,000: Gold Coast, Queensland and Newcastle, New South Wales. In terms of climate, the area is dominated by a humid subtropical zone, with some tropical (Queensland) and oceanic climate (Australian Capital Territory, Victoria, southern New South Wales) zones. In most situations, the eastern states are defined as those who use Australian Eastern Standard Time (AEST), and that is the definition that this article will adhere to, unless noted.

== Divisions between the east and west ==
There is only one major railway line linking the eastern states to Western Australia, the Trans-Australian Railway, which opened in 1917.

There is only one major highway linking the eastern states to Western Australia, the Eyre Highway which opened in 1942.

Since the 1980s, various governments have proposed building a high-speed rail in Australia. However, this rail would only connect the eastern states of Victoria, New South Wales and Queensland. Adelaide has often been included in the proposal and former Greens leader Bob Brown once said that a high speed rail connecting Perth was inevitable.

In 2015 international visitors in Australia spent $24.1 billion. The eastern states and territory made $20.5 billion of that total, or 85%. Likewise, the eastern states collected 8,588,000 (85%) individual visits to a state over that year, out of a possible 10,133,000.

== Population ==
The combined population of Queensland, New South Wales, the Australian Capital Territory, Victoria and Tasmania is 19,484,100, or 81% of Australia's population. These five states and territory cover 2,829,463 km^{2}, or 37% of Australia's total land area.

=== Cities ===
Greater Capital City Statistical Area (GCCSA) or Significant Urban Areas (SUA), with a population of over 30,000, from north to south:

| City | State/territory | Population | Percentage of national population |
|---|---|---|---|
| Cairns | Queensland | 178,649 | 0.80% |
| Townsville | Queensland | 162,292 | 0.73% |
| Mackay | Queensland | 85,040 | 0.36% |
| Rockhampton | Queensland | 80,345 | 0.38% |
| Gladstone | Queensland | 32,073 | 0.14% |
| Bundaberg | Queensland | 70,540 | 0.32% |
| Hervey Bay | Queensland | 48,680 | 0.22% |
| Sunshine Coast | Queensland | 297,380 | 1.33% |
| Brisbane | Queensland | 2,274,560 | 10.18% |
| Toowoomba | Queensland | 113,625 | 0.51% |
| Gold Coast-Tweed Heads | Queensland/New South Wales | 614,379 | 2.75% |
| Coffs Harbour | New South Wales | 68,052 | 0.29% |
| Tamworth | New South Wales | 41,810 | 0.18% |
| Port Macquarie | New South Wales | 44,875 | 0.19% |
| Dubbo | New South Wales | 36,622 | 0.16% |
| Newcastle-Maitland | New South Wales | 430,755 | 1.83% |
| Orange | New South Wales | 39,766 | 0.17% |
| Central Coast (Gosford) | New South Wales | 304,753 | 1.36% |
| Bathurst | New South Wales | 35,391 | 0.15% |
| Sydney | New South Wales | 4,840,628 | 20.61% |
| Wollongong | New South Wales | 289,236 | 1.23% |
| Bowral-Mittagong | New South Wales | 37,495 | 0.16% |
| Nowra-Bomaderry | New South Wales | 35,383 | 0.15% |
| Mildura-Wentworth | Victoria/New South Wales | 49,836 | 0.21% |
| Wagga Wagga | New South Wales | 55,364 | 0.24% |
| Canberra-Queanbeyan | Australian Capital Territory/New South Wales | 422,510 | 1.80% |
| Albury-Wodonga | New South Wales/Victoria | 87,890 | 0.37% |
| Shepparton-Mooroopna | Victoria | 49,079 | 0.21% |
| Bendigo | Victoria | 91,692 | 0.39% |
| Ballarat | Victoria | 98,543 | 0.42% |
| Melbourne | Victoria | 4,440,328 | 18.90% |
| Warragul-Drouin | Victoria | 32,698 | 0.14% |
| Geelong | Victoria | 184,182 | 0.78% |
| Traralgon-Morwell | Victoria | 40,851 | 0.17% |
| Warrnambool | Victoria | 33,856 | 0.14% |
| Devonport | Tasmania | 30,445 | 0.13% |
| Launceston | Tasmania | 86,393 | 0.37% |
| Hobart | Tasmania | 219,243 | 0.93% |
| Total: | | 16,085,239 | 68.58% |

== See also ==
- Australian regional rivalries
- Southern Australia
- Northern Australia
- Western Australia
- Pacific coast
