= John Daniel (ship's captain) =

John Daniel was an English sea captain who, in the ship New London, charted part of the coast of Western Australia in 1681. Daniel and the New London are believed to have been the second group of English mariners to sight the mainland of Australia, after the Tryall was wrecked in 1620 (and preceding William Dampier's Roebuck, in 1688).

A surviving copy of Daniel's chart indicates that the "Dangerous Rocks" he sighted was the Wallabi Group; the northernmost islands in the Houtman Abrolhos. A printed copy of Daniel's journal of the voyage has also survived, including a brief description of the islands.

With the wind S.W. by W. steering by compass N.E. by E. at 10 a.m. the water was discoloured. A man at the foretop saw a breach rise ahead of us. We put our helm hard a starboard...and weathered the N.W. end of it about half a mile...The breach that we first saw happened to be the northernmost of all, there being several and by our computation [they] are 20 miles in length. Within the breaches, several small white sandy islands were seen, with some bushes on them. A very heavy sea broke against the south part of these shoals. When close to them the mainland was not seen.

Daniel also bestowed the name "Maiden's Isle" upon an island that may have been Rottnest Island.
