= Cinderella state =

Australian political term

Cinderella state is a term used in Australian politics by people who regard their state to be financially or politically disadvantaged, neglected, or unrecognised, in comparison to other states.

Public figures from every Australian state have been recorded as regarding their own state as the Cinderella state.

- In Western Australia the term, and its implications were expressed in the 1933 secession proposal, on the basis of Western Australia's mineral wealth and perceived neglect by the rest of Australia.
- Tasmania is regarded as a Cinderella state on the basis of its small size, detachment from the mainland, and perceived neglect by the rest of Australia.
- Queensland is sometimes said to be the Cinderella state on the basis of its mineral and agricultural wealth, and perceived neglect by the rest of Australia.
- New South Wales has also been called the Cinderella state on the basis of its high population but a share of federal resources which is not at the same proportion.
- Victoria has also been called the Cinderella state on the basis of a perception of a disproportionately low share of federal resources.
- South Australia has been called the Cinderella state on the basis of disproportionately high unemployment.

== See also ==
- Australian regional rivalry
- Section 96 of the Constitution of Australia, permitting federal grants to states
- Similar phenomena in Canada
  - Equalization payments, for a "have-not" province
  - Western alienation
  - Maritime Rights Movement
