= Section 125 of the Constitution of Australia =

Section 125 of the Constitution of Australia deals with matters relating to the seat of the Commonwealth government. It specifies that it will be in its own territory that is under direct Commonwealth control, that will be at least 100 miles (160 km) from Sydney and will have an area of no less than 100 square miles (260 km^{2}). It also specifies the temporary seat of government to be Melbourne, which was to be used until the permanent seat of government was built.

Its precise text is:

The seat of Government of the Commonwealth shall be determined by the Parliament, and shall be within territory which shall have been granted to or acquired by the Commonwealth, and shall be vested in and belong to the Commonwealth, and shall be in the State of New South Wales, and be distant not less than one hundred miles from Sydney.

Such territory shall contain an area of not less than one hundred square miles, and such portion thereof as shall consist of Crown lands shall be granted to the Commonwealth without any payment therefor.

The Parliament shall sit at Melbourne until it meet at the seat of Government.
