= 1933 Western Australian secession referendum =

- 8 April 1933
- Are you in favour of the State of Western Australia withdrawing from the Federal Commonwealth established under the Commonwealth of Australia Constitution Act (Imperial)?

Results
Choice	Votes	%
Yes	138,653	66.23%
No	70,706	33.77%
Valid votes	209,359	96.33%
Invalid or blank votes	7,967	3.67%
Total votes	217,326	100.00%
Registered voters/turnout	237,198	91.62%

- Are you in favour of a Convention of Representatives of equal number from each of the Australian states being summoned for the purpose of proposing such alterations in the Constitution of the Commonwealth as may appear to such Convention to be necessary?

Results
Choice	Votes	%
Yes	88,275	42.58%
No	119,031	57.42%
Valid votes	207,306	95.43%
Invalid or blank votes	9,928	4.57%
Total votes	217,234	100.00%
Registered voters/turnout	237,198	91.58%

The 1933 Western Australian secession referendum was held on 8 April 1933 on the question of whether the Australian state of Western Australia should leave the Australian federation. Nearly two-thirds of electors voted in favour of secession, but efforts to implement the result proved unsuccessful.

The Western Australian secession movement emerged soon after the federation of the Australian colonies in 1901. Existing grievances over the impacts of the federal constitution and the federal government's economic policies were exacerbated by the Great Depression. The Dominion League of Western Australia was established in 1930 to lobby for secession, with leading campaigners including newspaper editor James MacCallum Smith and businessman Keith Watson. Their efforts led state premier James Mitchell to legislate for a secession referendum in 1932, although the vote was not binding on either the state government or the federal government.

The referendum saw a turnout of 91.6 percent of registered voters, with 66.2 percent voting in favour of secession. A second question on whether a national constitutional convention should be held was rejected by 57.4 percent of voters. The referendum was held simultaneously with the 1933 Western Australian state election, with Mitchell losing office to Philip Collier, who opposed secession. Collier's government nonetheless passed the Secession Act 1934, which authorised a delegation to petition the parliament of the United Kingdom for an amendment to the Australian constitution, which had originally been passed as a British act of parliament. A parliamentary joint select committee ultimately ruled that the Statute of Westminster 1931 had rendered the British parliament powerless to unilaterally amend the constitution.

== Background ==
Western Australia was the last of the British colonies in Australia to agree to join the new federation in 1901. Secessionist sentiment was quick to arise, driven by the detrimental impact of the federal government's protectionist economic policies on the state's agricultural and mining sectors. As early as 1906, the Western Australian Legislative Assembly passed a resolution calling for a secession referendum, although no action was taken by the state government. Dissatisfaction with the federal government continued throughout the first decades after federation. Lobbying from Western Australians led to two royal commissions into the Australian constitution in the 1920s, but no changes were forthcoming.

The Great Depression had a significant impact on Western Australia, leading to increased dissatisfaction with the federal government and support for secession. In May 1930, secessionists established the Dominion League of Western Australia, which called for the state to leave the federation and become a separate self-governing dominion with the British Empire. The Dominion League "held frequent and well-attended public rallies, at which League speakers emphasised that the only real solution to Western Australia's problems lay in secession". The Sunday Times and its editor James MacCallum Smith had been advocates of secession for several decades and lent their support to the League. In June 1930, the Primary Producers' Association and Federated Chambers of Commerce also came out in favour of secession, following the Scullin government's announcement that it would continue its high-tariff policy and would not provide support for primary producers.

In November 1930, state premier James Mitchell declared his personal support for secession. A bill for a secession referendum was introduced in November 1931 and passed by the Legislative Assembly, but initially failed to pass the Legislative Council. A second bill was passed in November 1932 as the Secession Referendum Act 1932, specifying that the referendum would be held at the same time as the next state election. Secession enjoyed the strong support of the Country Party, which governed in coalition with Mitchell's Nationalist Party. The Nationalists did not take an official position, whereas the opposition Australian Labor Party (ALP) led by Philip Collier was against secession.

== Campaign ==
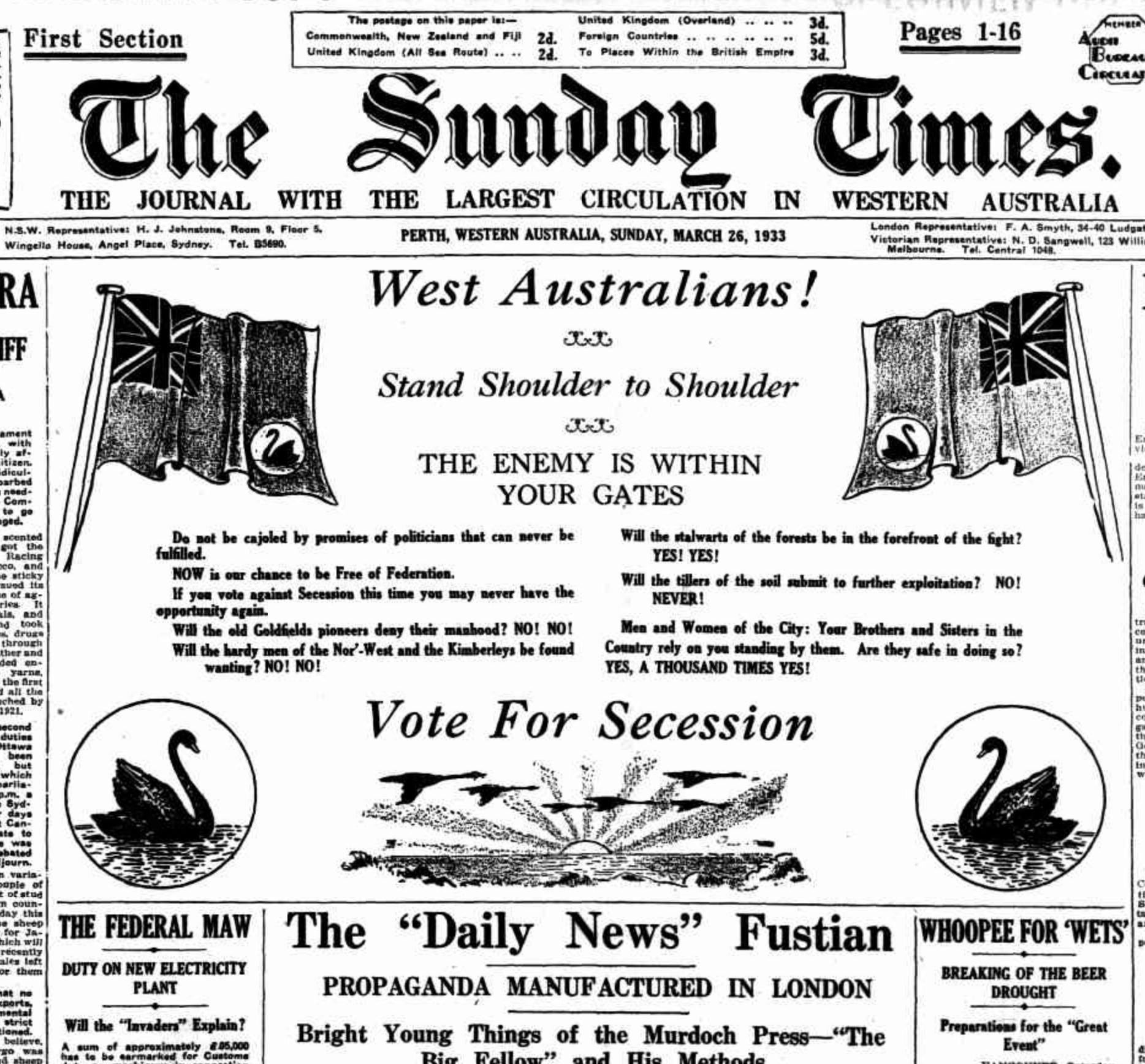
Pro-secession headline from The Sunday Times in March 1933

The campaign for secession was led by the Dominion League, which focused on Western Australia's "traditional grievances" with federation and the constitution. Anti-secessionist organisations included the Federal League and the Unity League, both of which had limited resources. State premier James Mitchell and opposition leader Philip Collier both played little role in the campaign, with Mitchell not wanting to alienate anti-secessionist elements in the Nationalist Party and Collier not wanting to alienate pro-secessionist voters.

The Dominion League "crafted a mythology of oppression and played on a sense of 'lost liberty' and 'distinct identity', and not only economic injustice, in order to galvanise a mass movement". The league produced numerous pamphlets and political tracts, while other writers produced a series of nationalist poems and songs, including the "Westralia Shall Be Free", "Liberty's Light", and the "Dominion Anthem".

In March 1933, Prime Minister Joseph Lyons led a federal delegation to Western Australia to campaign against secession, appearing alongside defence minister George Pearce, Victorian senator Tom Brennan, and senior public servant Stuart McFarlane. Western Australia's isolation at the time was such that Lyons appointed John Latham as acting prime minister, an appointment usually reserved for overseas trips.

Among Western Australia's federal politicians, leading supporters of secession included Country Party senator Bertie Johnston and Nationalist senator Hal Colebatch, while leading opponents included Pearce and Nationalist MP Walter Nairn. Nationalist senator Patrick Lynch supported secession but did not actively campaign as he believed it would conflict with his role as president of the Senate.

== Results ==
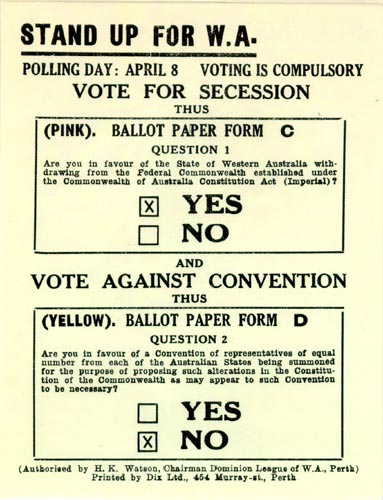
Secessionist How-to-vote card, 1933

Two questions were voted on at the referendum:

Question 1: Are you in favour of the State of Western Australia withdrawing from the Federal Commonwealth established under the Commonwealth of Australia Constitution Act (Imperial)?

Question 2: Are you in favour of a Convention of Representatives of equal number from each of the Australian states being summoned for the purpose of proposing such alterations in the Constitution of the Commonwealth as may appear to such Convention to be necessary?

There were 237,198 registered voters. The result on the first question was 138,653 in favour and 70,706 against. Question Two was rejected by a vote of 119,031 to 88,275. Only six of the fifty electoral districts recorded a No vote on the first question, five of them being in the Goldfields and Kimberley regions. (Note: The electoral districts to vote no were: Boulder; Brownhill-Ivanhoe; Hannans; Kalgoorlie; Kimberley; Murchison.)

Result
Question	Yes		No	
Question	Votes	%	Votes	%
1. Western Australia withdrawal from Commonwealth of Australia	138,653	66.23%	70,706	33.77%
Metropolitan (Note: Metropolitan: Canning; Claremont; Fremantle; Fremantle NE; Fremantle S; Guildford-Mid; Leederville; Maylands; Middle Swan; Mt Hawthorn; Nedlands; Perth; Perth E; Perth N; Perth W; Subiaco; Victoria Park.)	72,037	64.85%	39,043	35.15%
Agricultural (Note: Agricultural: Albany; Avon; Beverley; Bunbury; Collie; Forrest; Geraldton; Greenough; Irwin-Moore; Katanning; Mt Marshall; Murray-Wellington; Nelson; Northam; Pingelly; Sussex; Swan; Toodyay; Wagin; Williams-Narrogin; York.)	57,316	72.89%	21,319	27.11%
Mining and Pastoral (Note: Mining and Pastoral: Boulder; Brownhill-Ivanhoe; Hannans; Kalgoorlie; Kanowna; Mt Magnet; Murchison; Yilgarn.)	7,763	45.55%	9,279	54.45%
Northern (Note: Northern: Gascoyne; Kimberley; Pilbarra; Roebourne.)	1,537	59.07%	1,065	40.93%
2. Australian states' constitutional convention	88,275	42.58%	119,031	57.42%
Metropolitan	48,066	43.75%	61,821	56.26%
Agricultural	29,509	37.90%	48,348	62.10%
Mining and Pastoral	9,271	54.70%	7,677	45.30%
Northern	1,329	51.04%	1,275	48.96%

== Aftermath ==
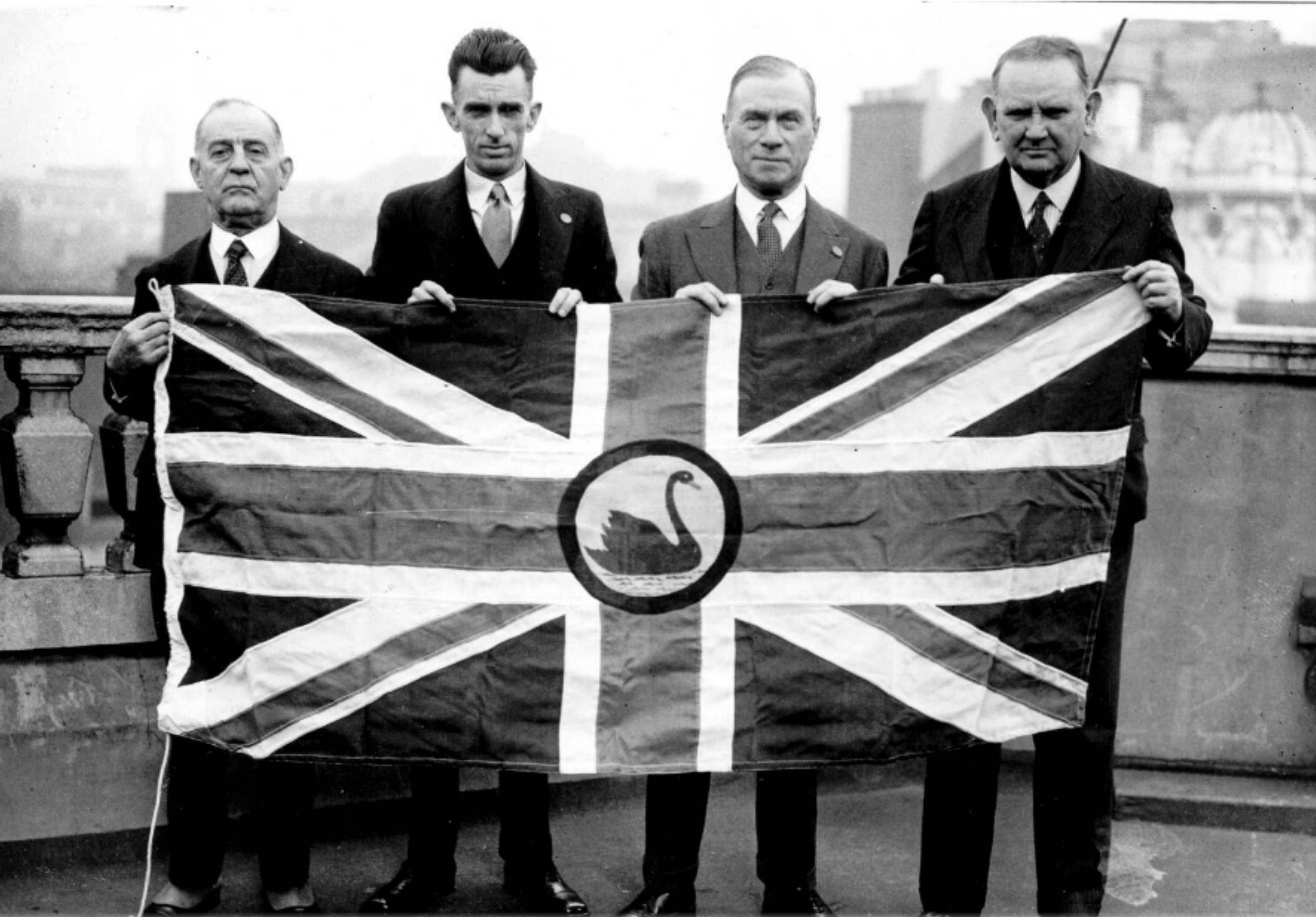
Members of the secession delegation holding the proposed dominion flag – from left: Matthew Moss, Keith Watson, James MacCallum Smith and Hal Colebatch

The secession referendum was held simultaneously with the 1933 Western Australian state election, which saw incumbent pro-secessionist premier James Mitchell's coalition government defeated by Philip Collier's anti-secessionist Australian Labor Party (ALP). Mitchell lost his own seat in parliament.

Despite Collier's opposition to secession, his government passed the Secession Act 1934 which authorised a delegation to petition the parliament of United Kingdom to amend the Constitution of Australia. The state government nominated London-based former premier Hal Colebatch as leader of the delegation, with the other members being leading secessionists James MacCallum Smith and Keith Watson and barrister Matthew Moss as legal adviser. It has been suggested that the absence of high-ranking members of the government weakened the credibility of the delegation to some degree.

The delegation presented the petition to the British parliament on 17 December 1934, with Adrian Moreing receiving the petition on behalf of the House of Commons and the Marquess of Aberdeen and Temair receiving the petition on behalf of the House of Lords. A 489-page document titled The Case for Secession, largely authored by Watson, was also circulated to members of parliament. It "set out a comprehensive documentation of the State's grievance", including "the State's historical and political development, its economic situation, the oppressive circumstances under which it entered federation, the background of the secession movement, and the viability of the state as an independent entity".

Based on the advice of the British government, in early 1935 the British parliament established a joint select committee to determine whether it was constitutionally capable of receiving the petition in the context of the Statute of Westminster 1931, which had placed significant restrictions on the parliament's ability to legislate for the dominions. The petition was ultimately rejected by the joint committee in November 1935, which found that the Statute of Westminster and Balfour Declaration of 1926 had made it incompatible with the "constitutional conventions of the Empire unless the demand for such legislation came as the clearly expressed wish of the Australian people as a whole". The Dominion League's subsequent calls for a unilateral declaration of independence were rejected by the state government, and the league disbanded in 1938.

== Legacy and analysis ==
Less than a month after the secession vote, the Lyons government introduced a bill creating the Commonwealth Grants Commission to provide additional federal funding to states disadvantaged by federal legislation. The movement in Western Australia had led to other smaller states mooting secession, with Tasmanian premier Albert Ogilvie and South Australian premier Richard Layton Butler both making comments in support of leaving the federation.

Both contemporary sources and later writers have debated the extent to which the pro-secession vote was a genuine manifestation of Western Australian nationalism or an anti-government protest vote. The results of the 1933 referendum have often been invoked by later revivals of the secession movement and by other Western Australian groups dissatisfied with the actions of the federal government.

The joint select committee's rejection of the secession petition was cited in the Supreme Court of Canada's Patriation Reference of 1981, which concerned the ability of the British parliament to amend the constitution of Canada and had implications for the proposed secession of Quebec.

== Sources ==
- Besant, Christopher (1990). "Two nations, two destinies: a reflection on the significance of the Western Australian secession movement to Australia, Canada and the British empire" (PDF). UWA Law Review. 20: 209–310. Archived (PDF) from the original on 26 March 2023.
- Musgrave, Thomas (2003). "The Western Australian Secessionist Movement" (PDF). Macquarie Law Journal. 3: 95–129. Archived from the original (PDF) on 21 August 2006.
- Stannage, Charles Thomas, ed. (1981). A New History of Western Australia. Nedlands: UWA Publishing. ISBN 0-85564-181-9. LCCN 82101009. OCLC 963830667. OL 3517729M. Wikidata Q125995168.
- Zimmermann, Augusto (2012). "The still reluctant state: Western Australia and the conceptual foundations of Australian federalism". In Appleby, Gabrielle; Aroney, Nicholas; John, Thomas (eds.). The Future of Australian Federalism: Comparative and Interdisciplinary Perspectives. Cambridge University Press. pp. 75–95. doi:10.1017/CBO9780511902550.008. ISBN 9780511902550.
