= Dulcie Noleine Scrimgeour =

(1915–1993) community worker and brothel madam

Dulcie Noleine Scrimgeour, also known as Mary Scrim (17 August 1915 – 8 November 1994) was a sex worker and madam at numerous brothels throughout Western Australia, primarily in Kalgoorlie and Perth, from the 1940s to the 1980s. She was a successful businesswoman who had great financial success in this industry for several decades.

== Early life ==
Scrimgeour was born in Blenheim, New Zealand, where she was the youngest of eleven children. Little is known of her early life until, in 1935, she travelled to Europe via London and then spent two years living in the Channel Islands.

== Life in Australia ==
Scrimgeour travelled to Western Australia in 1937 where she joined one of her brothers, Barney Heyward, who owned and ran an amusement park and side-show in Kalgoorlie. Working at the park Scrimgeour met and formed a relationship with Albert Charles Paull, who was performing as a musician, and although Paull was married to a different woman they did not live together.

In November 1939 Scrimgeour gave birth to their daughter Lorraine Thelma Paull and the relationship fell apart. This led to a dispute regarding the payment of support which led to a violent incident on 6 January 1941 in which Scrimgeour cut Paull's face with a razor, with him requiring 14 stitches; she said she only meant to scare him. This led to a very public court case, which received extensive coverage in the press; she was found guilty of unlawful wounding but was released on bond. The jury found that she was "[g]uilty with a strong recommendation to mercy on extenuating circumstances".

During the trial, held at the Perth Police Court, Scrimgeour gave statements that their failed relationship and Paull's refusal to provide funds to support the care of their daughter led to her working in prostitution in both Perth and on Hay Street, Kalgoorlie; first as a cook and domestic worker and then as a sex worker.

In the early 1940s, in 1941 or 1942, Scrimgeour formed a relationship with William Thomas (Tom) Scrimgeour who worked as a truck driver in Western Australia and she became being known by his last name. In 1951 the couple had a son together, Roland John Charles Scrimgeour, who died in 1956.

Scrimgeour continued to work in the sex industry and was one of the most successful entrepreneurs in the region, working in and running brothels in Kalgoorlie and Perth due to unofficial police tolerance. In 1958, when there were increasing pressures on the industry, she closed her Perth brothel and opened two 'massage parlours'; Happy Haven and Paradise Chicks in Maylands.

Despite financial success over several decades, Scrimgeour declared bankruptcy in 1987 and appears to have retired.

== Later life ==
Scrimgeour died on 8 November 1993 during a visit to her daughter Lorraine in Canada and her body was repatriated to Australia.
