= Kalgoorlie =

City in Western Australia

Kalgoorlie–Boulder
- City
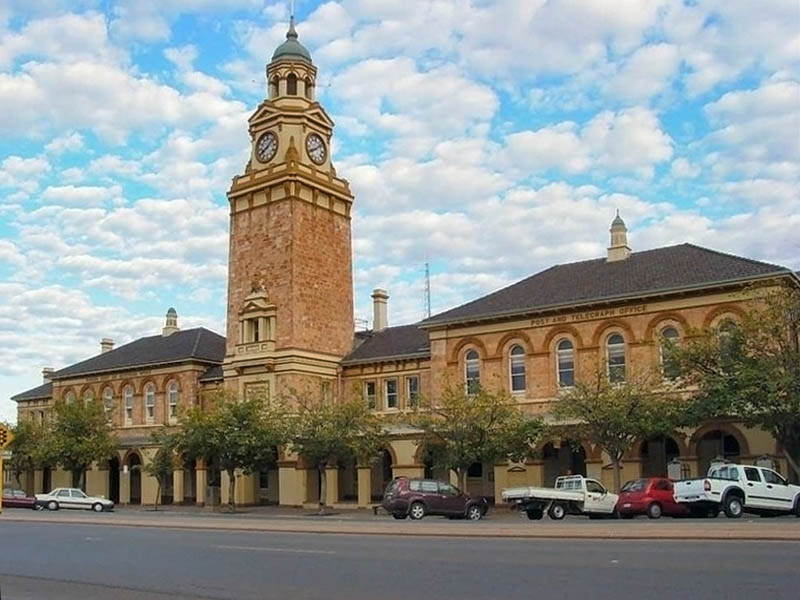
- Kalgoorlie Court House and Post Office

- Coordinates: 30°44′56″S 121°27′57″E
- Country: Australia
- State: Western Australia
- LGA: City of Kalgoorlie–Boulder
- Location: 595 km (370 mi) E of Perth; 391 km (243 mi) N of Esperance
- Established: 1893

Government
  - State electorate: Kalgoorlie
  - Federal division: O'Connor

Area (2011 urban)
  - Total: 75.1 km^{2} (29.0 sq mi)
- Elevation: 383 m (1,257 ft)

Population
  - Total: 29,072 (2021 census)
  - Density: 387.11/km^{2} (1,002.6/sq mi)
- Time zone: UTC+8 (AWST)
- Mean max temp: 25.2 °C (77.4 °F)
- Mean min temp: 11.6 °C (52.9 °F)
- Annual rainfall: 265.6 mm (10.46 in)

Kalgoorlie (/ˈkælˌɡʊːɹli/ kal-GOO-LEE), also known as Kalgoorlie–Boulder, is a city in the Goldfields–Esperance region of Western Australia, located 595 km (370 mi) east-northeast of Perth at the end of the Great Eastern Highway. It is referred to as Kalgoorlie–Boulder as the surrounding urban area includes the historic townsite of Boulder and the local government area is the City of Kalgoorlie–Boulder.

Kalgoorlie–Boulder lies on the traditional lands of the Kapurn people. The city was established in 1893 during the Western Australian gold rushes. It soon replaced Coolgardie as the largest settlement on the Eastern Goldfields. Kalgoorlie is the ultimate destination of the Goldfields Water Supply Scheme and the Golden Pipeline Heritage Trail. The nearby Super Pit gold mine was Australia's largest open-cut gold mine for many years.

During August 2021, Kalgoorlie–Boulder had an estimated urban population of 29,072, a slight decline from the recent peak of 32,966 in 2013.

== Toponymy ==
=== Kalgoorlie ===
As of 1894, when the Western Australian government decided to declare a townsite for the place now named Kalgoorlie, the area was known locally as "Hannan's Find", an allusion to Patrick (Paddy) Hannan and his gold find there in June 1893. That name was also the local preference for any official nomenclature, but the name proposed for the official townsite was "Hannans".

In suggesting that name to the Commissioner of Crown Lands, the Under Secretary for Lands, R Cecil Clifton, observed that the "native name of the place is 'Calgoorlie' but this is rather too much like Coolgardie and if adopted is, I fear likely to lead to postal mistakes". Despite that observation, the Forrest ministry selected "Kalgoorlie" in August 1894, and that choice soon came to be accepted.

The name Kalgoorlie (sometimes unofficially spelt Kalgurli) has its origins in the Wangai language spoken by certain Aboriginal peoples of the Eastern Goldfields sub-region.

Various sources have given the name a variety of meanings, including 'an Aboriginal dog chasing a kangaroo', the name of a local shrub (Galgurli) and the name, or place, of the edible silky pear (Kulgoolah) (also spelt Karlkurla or Kulgooluh).

=== Boulder ===
The townsite of Boulder, gazetted in 1896, is named after a gold mining lease, "The Great Boulder". The name of the mining lease, in turn, alludes to a discussion in 1893 between four men in Dashwoods Gully, South Australia. That discussion was about a local mining lease known as "The Boulder", which featured large sandstone boulders with a few wiry stringers of gold.

Two of the men, William Brookman and Charles de Rose, had been working the Dashwoods Gully lease without much success. The other two were George Brookman, their backer, and Sam Pearce, an experienced prospector. During the discussion, George Brookman said that he might be able to raise funds in Adelaide to send a small prospecting party to Coolgardie.

Later, the Adelaide Prospecting Company was formed. In July 1893, it sent William Brookman and Pearce to Coolgardie. On arrival, the two men decided to move on to the new field at Hannan's Find, near which they eventually camped at Ivanhoe Hill. There, Pearce discovered a first lead, later known as the Ivanhoe lease, and then a second, much richer lead. In August 1893, he and William Brookman registered a lease of the second lead named The Great Boulder, in memory of the Dashwoods Gully lease.

== History ==
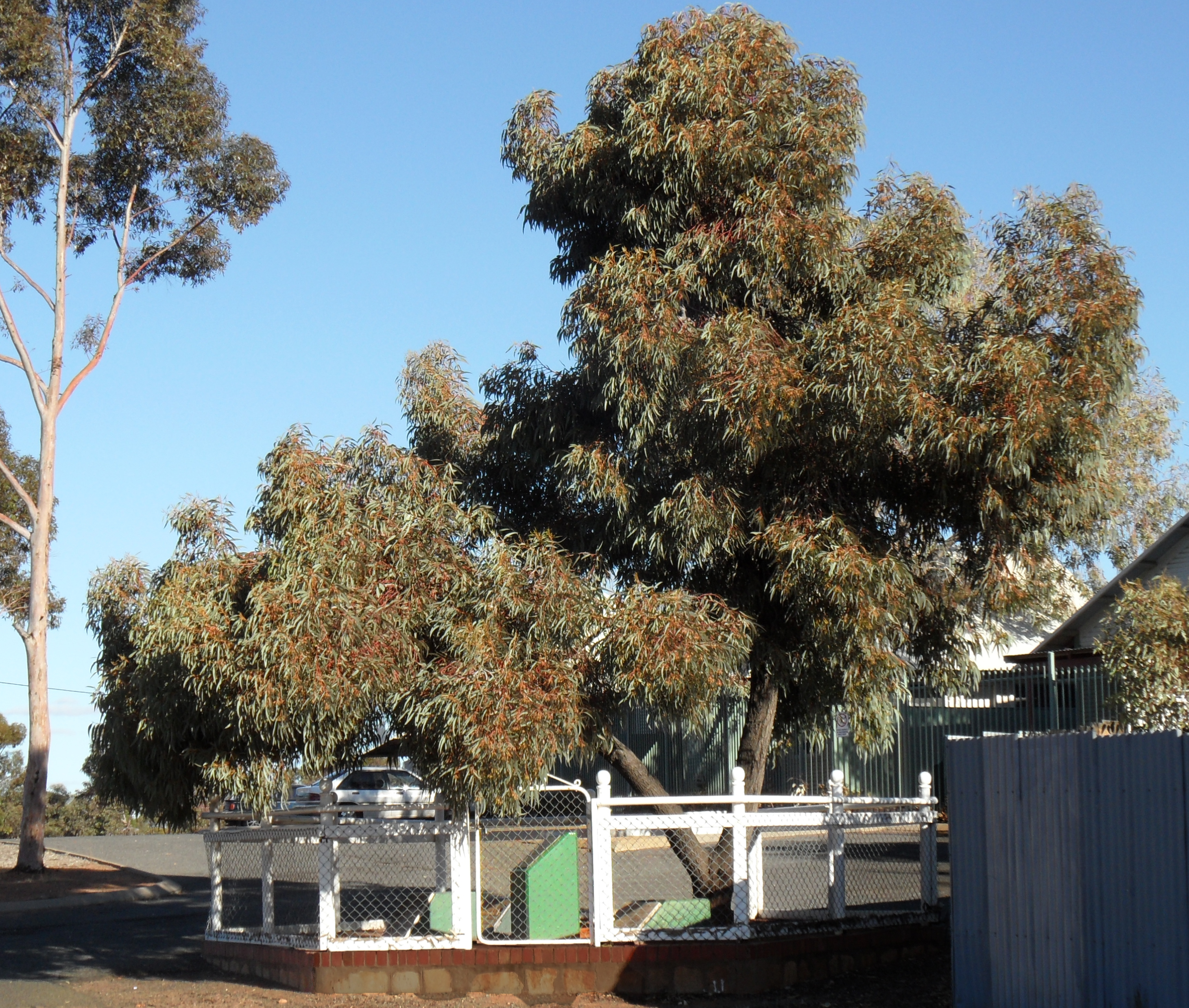
Since 1897, a tree has marked the spot where gold was found on 14 June 1893.

Kalgoorlie–Boulder lies on the traditional lands of the Kapurn people. Languages including Kalaamaya, part of the Kapurn language family, continue to be spoken there today.

In the winter of 1893, prospectors Patrick (Paddy) Hannan, Tom Flanagan, and Dan Shea were travelling to Mount Youle, when one of their horses cast a shoe. During the halt in their journey, the men noticed signs of gold in the area around the foot of what is now the Mount Charlotte gold mine, located on a small hill north of the current city, and decided to stay and investigate. On 17 June 1893, Hannan filed a Reward Claim, leading to hundreds of men swarming to the area in search of gold, and Kalgoorlie, originally called Hannan's Find, was born.

During the ensuing gold rush, significant deposits of calaverite were discovered, but ignored as it was believed at the time that this was a mineral akin to fool's gold. The calaverite was subsequently used for construction in the town, including for buildings and paving. When it was realised in 1896 that calaverite is a compound of tellurium with actual gold, there was a rush to demolish any such structures in order to extract the gold therein. Nearly every structure created in the previous three years was scrapped in the process.

The population of the town was 2,018 (1,516 males and 502 females) in 1898.

The mining of gold, along with other metals such as nickel, has been a major industry in Kalgoorlie ever since, and today employs about one-quarter of Kalgoorlie's workforce and generates a significant proportion of its income. The concentrated area of large gold mines surrounding the original Hannan's find is often referred to as the Golden Mile, and was sometimes referred to as the world's richest square mile of earth.

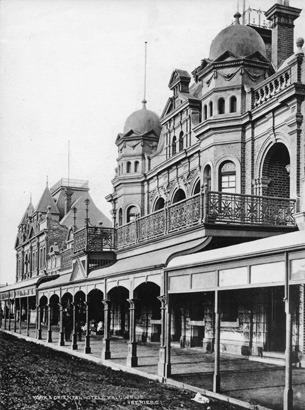
York and Oriental Hotels, c. 1900

In 1901, the population of Kalgoorlie was 4,793 (3,087 males and 1,706 females) which increased to 6,790 (3,904 males and 2,886 females) by 1903.

The 3 ft 6 in (1,067 mm) narrow-gauge Government Eastern Goldfields Railway line reached Kalgoorlie station in 1896, and the main named railway service from Perth was the overnight sleeper train The Westland, which ran until the 1970s. In 1917, a 4 ft 8 1/2 in (1,435 mm) standard gauge railway line was completed, connecting Kalgoorlie to Port Augusta, South Australia, across 2,000 kilometres (1,243 mi) of desert, and consequently the rest of the eastern states. The standardisation of the railway connecting Perth (which changed route from the narrow-gauge route) in 1968 completed the Sydney–Perth railway, making rail travel from Perth to Sydney possible; the Indian Pacific rail service commenced soon after. During the 1890s, the Goldfields area boomed as a whole, with an area population exceeding 200,000, composed mainly of prospectors. The area gained a reputation for being a "wild west", notorious for its bandits and prostitutes. This rapid increase in population and claims of neglect by the state government in Perth led to the proposition of the new state of Auralia, but with the sudden diaspora after the Gold Rush, these plans fell through.

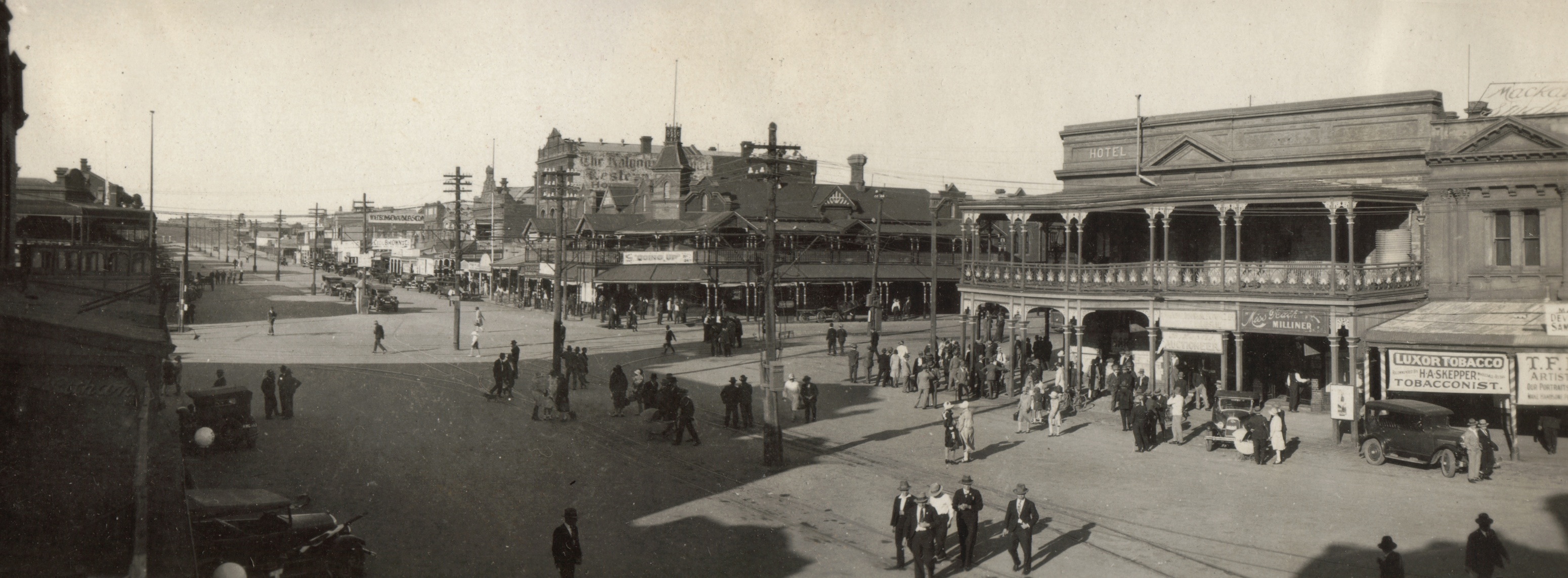
Hannan Street in September 1930; the Exchange Hotel is at the centre, with the Palace Hotel on the right.

Places, famous or infamous, for which Kalgoorlie is noted include its water pipeline, designed by C. Y. O'Connor and bringing in fresh water from Mundaring Weir near Perth, its Hay Street brothels, its two-up school, the goldfields railway loopline, the Kalgoorlie Town Hall, the Paddy Hannan statue/drinking fountain, the Super Pit, and Mount Charlotte lookout. Its main street is Hannan Street, named after the town's founder. One of the infamous brothels also serves as a museum and is a major national attraction.

Kalgoorlie and the surrounding district were served by an extensive collection of suburban railways and tramways, providing for both passenger and freight traffic.

In 1989, the Town of Kalgoorlie and Shire of Boulder formally amalgamated to create the City of Kalgoorlie–Boulder, adjoining the two towns into what is now the fifth most populous city in Western Australia.

On 20 April 2010, Kalgoorlie was shaken by an earthquake that reached 5.0 on the Richter scale. The epicentre was 30 km north east of the town. The quake caused damage to a number of commercial hotels and historic buildings along Burt Street in Boulder. The entire Burt St. precinct was evacuated until 23 April. Work in the Superpit and many other mines around Kalgoorlie was stopped. Two people suffered minor injuries as a result of the quake.

== Population ==
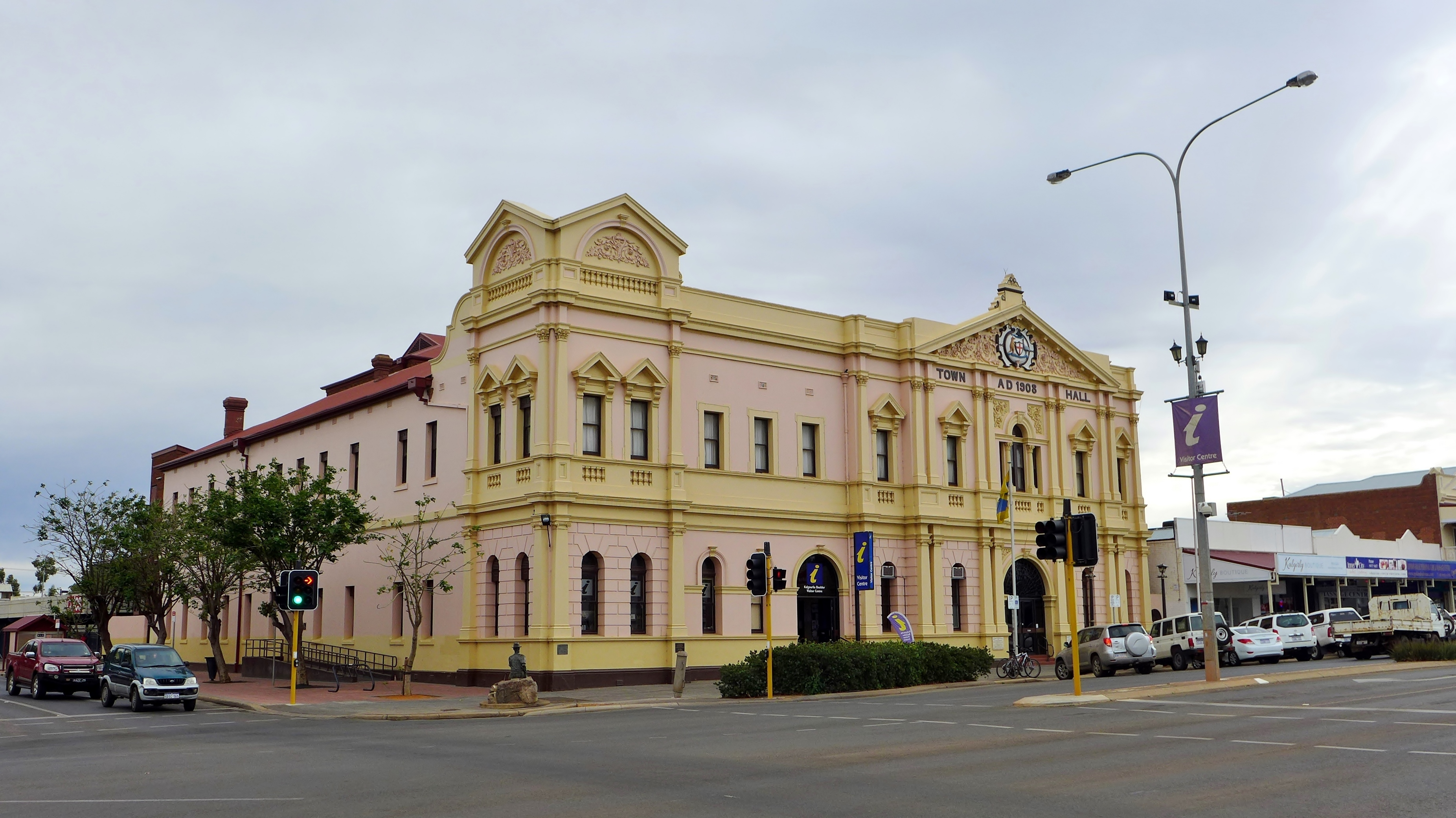
Kalgoorlie Town Hall

According to the 2021 census, there were 29,072 people in the Kalgoorlie–Boulder Significant Urban Area:

- Aboriginal and Torres Strait Islander people made up 7.7% of the population.
- 66.6% of people were born in Australia. The next most common countries of birth were New Zealand (7.0%), Philippines (2.6%), England (2.2%), South Africa (1.8%) and India (1.3%).
- 76.2% of people spoke only English at home. Other languages spoken at home included Afrikaans (1.1%), Tagalog (1.1%), Filipino (1.0%), Mandarin (0.7%) and Shona (0.6%).
- The most common responses for religion were No Religion (44.3%) and Catholic (18.1%).

== Geography ==
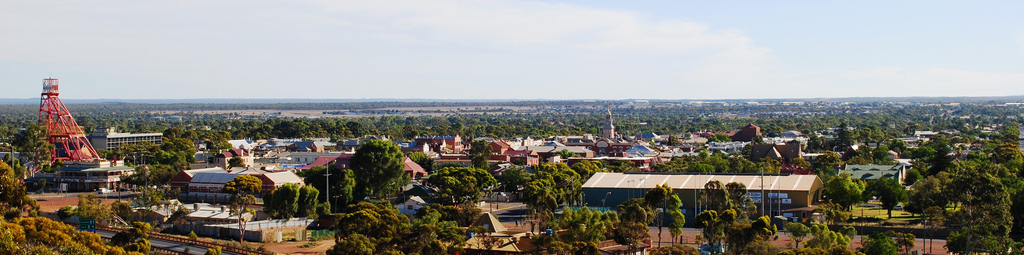
Panorama of Kalgoorlie, with the Airport visible behind and Boulder present behind the headframe

=== Climate ===
Kalgoorlie has a hot semi-arid climate (BSh) bordering both a hot desert climate (BWh) and a cool semi-arid climate (BSk) with hot summers and mild winters. The average annual rainfall is 260 mm (10 in) on an average of 68 days and, while the average rainfall is fairly evenly distributed throughout the year, there is considerable variation from year to year.

January is the hottest month, with an average maximum temperature of 33.6 °C (92.5 °F), but temperatures above 40.0 °C (104.0 °F) occur nearly once a week when hot, dry, north to northeasterly winds arrive. Such high temperatures are usually followed by a cool change from the south, and occasionally with a thunderstorm.

By contrast, winters are cool, with July average maximum and minimum temperatures being 16.7 °C (62.1 °F) and 5.0 °C (41.0 °F), respectively. Cold, wet days with a maximum below 12.0 °C (53.6 °F) occur about once every winter. The lowest maximum temperature recorded is 7.2 °C (45.0 °F), on 19 July 1961. Overnight temperatures fall below freezing about four times in a typical winter. Such events occur on clear nights following a day of cold southerly winds.

Climate data for Kalgoorlie
Month	Jan	Feb	Mar	Apr	May	Jun	Jul	Aug	Sep	Oct	Nov	Dec	Year
Record high °C (°F)	46.5 (115.7)	46.5 (115.7)	44.5 (112.1)	40.1 (104.2)	33.4 (92.1)	27.6 (81.7)	28.7 (83.7)	32.0 (89.6)	37.9 (100.2)	40.9 (105.6)	42.9 (109.2)	45.0 (113.0)	46.5 (115.7)
Mean daily maximum °C (°F)	33.6 (92.5)	32.1 (89.8)	29.5 (85.1)	25.3 (77.5)	20.6 (69.1)	17.5 (63.5)	16.7 (62.1)	18.6 (65.5)	22.3 (72.1)	25.8 (78.4)	28.9 (84.0)	31.9 (89.4)	25.2 (77.4)
Mean daily minimum °C (°F)	18.2 (64.8)	17.8 (64.0)	16.0 (60.8)	12.8 (55.0)	8.7 (47.7)	6.2 (43.2)	5.0 (41.0)	5.5 (41.9)	8.0 (46.4)	11.0 (51.8)	14.0 (57.2)	16.5 (61.7)	11.6 (52.9)
Record low °C (°F)	8.8 (47.8)	8.5 (47.3)	5.7 (42.3)	1.7 (35.1)	−1.8 (28.8)	−3.0 (26.6)	−3.4 (25.9)	−2.4 (27.7)	−0.6 (30.9)	−1.0 (30.2)	3.1 (37.6)	5.5 (41.9)	−3.4 (25.9)
Average precipitation mm (inches)	23.6 (0.93)	31.2 (1.23)	24.0 (0.94)	20.0 (0.79)	26.5 (1.04)	28.9 (1.14)	24.9 (0.98)	21.4 (0.84)	14.0 (0.55)	14.8 (0.58)	17.8 (0.70)	16.4 (0.65)	264.8 (10.43)
Average precipitation days (≥ 0.2mm)	3.9	4.5	4.3	3.2	7.1	8.7	9.2	7.5	5.6	4.3	4.1	3.8	68.3
Average afternoon relative humidity (%)	24	30	32	38	44	48	46	39	31	27	25	24	34
Average dew point °C (°F)	8 (46)	10 (50)	9 (48)	8 (46)	6 (43)	5 (41)	4 (39)	3 (37)	3 (37)	3 (37)	5 (41)	6 (43)	6 (42)
Mean daily sunshine hours	11.4	11.2	9.9	7.1	7.0	6.6	6.5	6.6	8.6	10.9	11.6	11.7	9.1
Source 1: Bureau of Meteorology
Source 2: Time and Date (dewpoints 1985–2015) Weather Atlas (sun hours)

== Industry and commerce ==
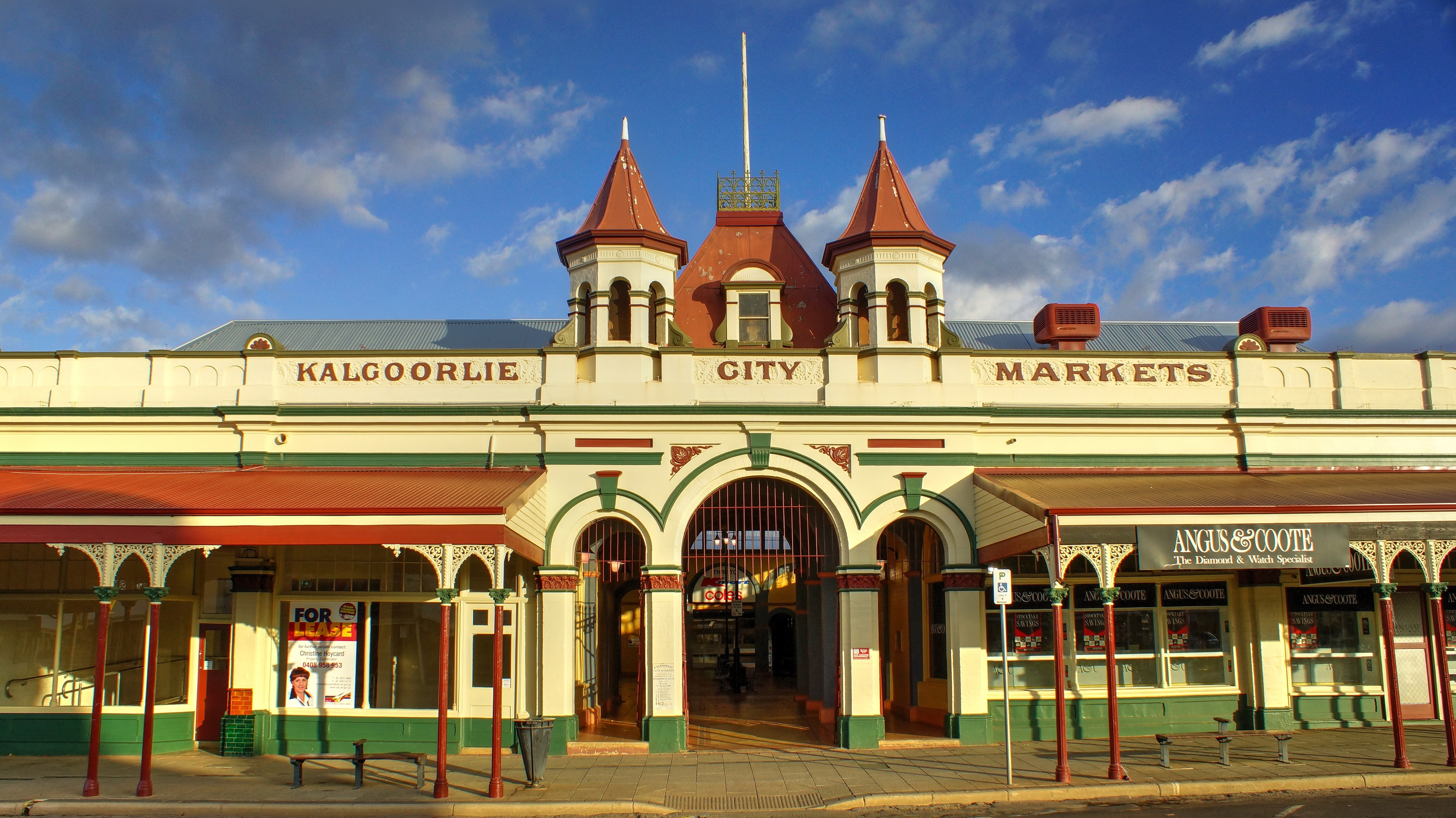
Kalgoorlie City Markets

Kalgoorlie–Boulder is a regional centre and has a Chamber of Commerce and a Chamber of Minerals and Energy.

=== Mining ===
Since 1992, Kalgoorlie has been home to the Diggers & Dealers conference, held annually in August. It is Australia's premier international mining conference.

The Fimiston Open Pit (Super Pit) is an open-cut gold mine about 3.6 km (2.2 mi) long, 1.6 km (1.0 mi) wide, and over 600 m (1,969 ft) deep. Originally consisting of a large number of underground mines, including the Paringa, Oroya, Brown Hill, Chaffers, and Hainault mines, they were consolidated into a single open pit mine in 1989. A visitor centre overlooks the mine, which operates 24 hours a day, 7 days a week. The mine blasts at 1:00 pm every day, unless winds would carry dust over the town. Each of the massive trucks carries 225 tonnes of rock and the round trip takes about 35 minutes, most of that time being the slow uphill haul. Employees must live in Kalgoorlie; there's no fly-in, fly-out operation. The current life of mine plan covers operation until 2035, with investigations for mine extension ongoing.

Gold mines in the Kalgoorlie region

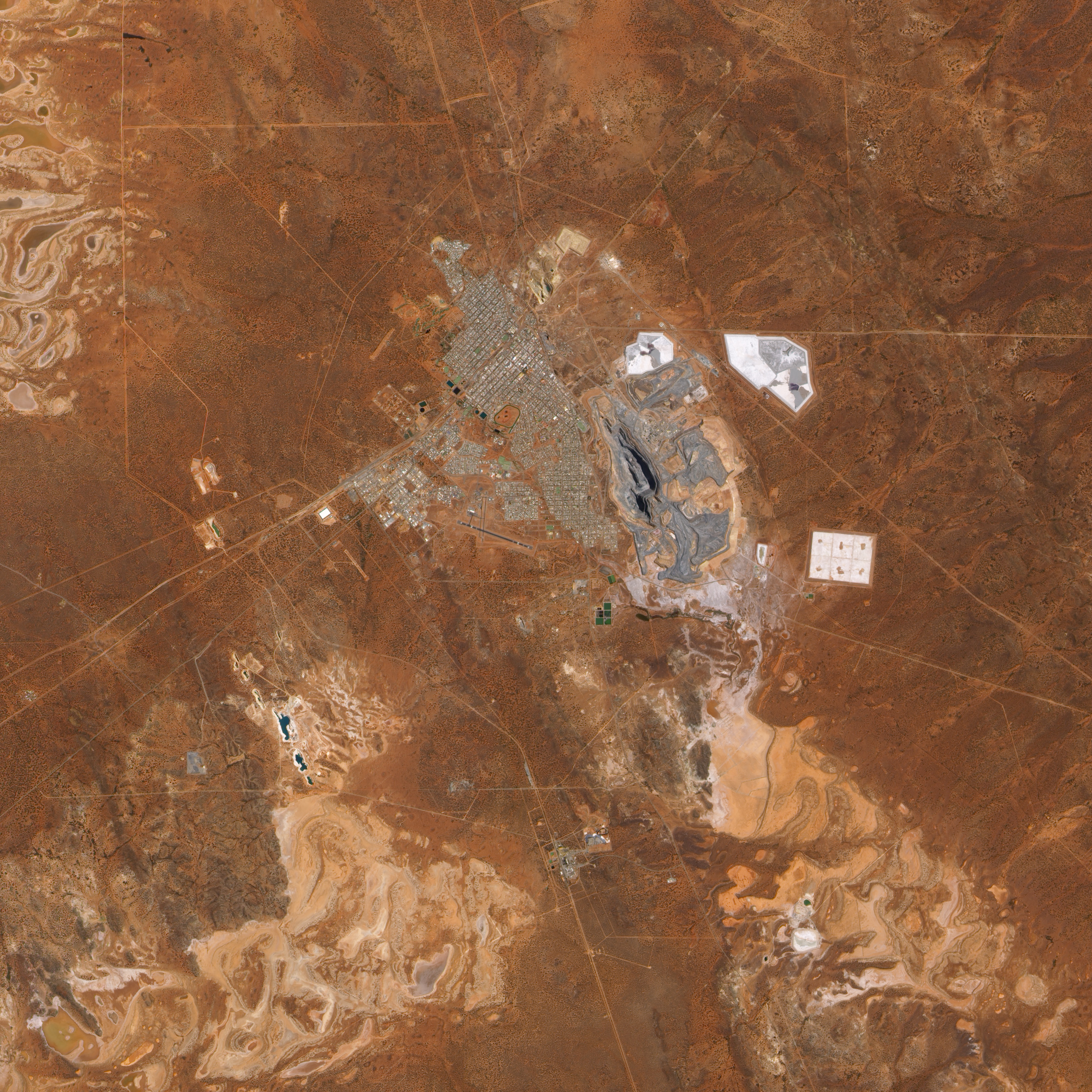
The Super Pit that gives the mine its name appears in the centre of this image.

=== Sex work ===
Kalgoorlie once had a thriving sex industry, with parts of Hay Street once being considered Kalgoorlie's red-light district. Originally, brothels were only allowed to operate in Hay Street. While there were once a number of brothels in Kalgoorlie, this has since decreased. Prostitutes and sex workers from all over the world moved to Kalgoorlie for employment in the town's sex work industry.

One of these sex workers, who later ran numerous brothels in the area, was Dulcie Noleine Scrimgeour who felt forced into the industry after giving birth to a daughter outside of marriage. She found great financial success as a madam between the 1940s and the 1980s.

Today, only one brothel remains in Kalgoorlie: Questa Casa (Italian for "This House"; locally known as the "Pink House"). Questa Casa claims to be Australia's oldest operating brothel, having begun operations in 1904. Questa Casa now only employs two sex workers, but also serves as an adult tourist attraction.

The demise of the red light district has largely been attributed to the rescinding of the Containment Policy in 1994. The Containment Policy was an informal policy that restricted all sex work in Kalgoorlie to one street: Hay Street. Nevertheless, "skimpy barmaids" (female bartenders who wear sexually provocative clothing, usually flying into Kalgoorlie from elsewhere) are known to occasionally sell sex.

== Culture ==
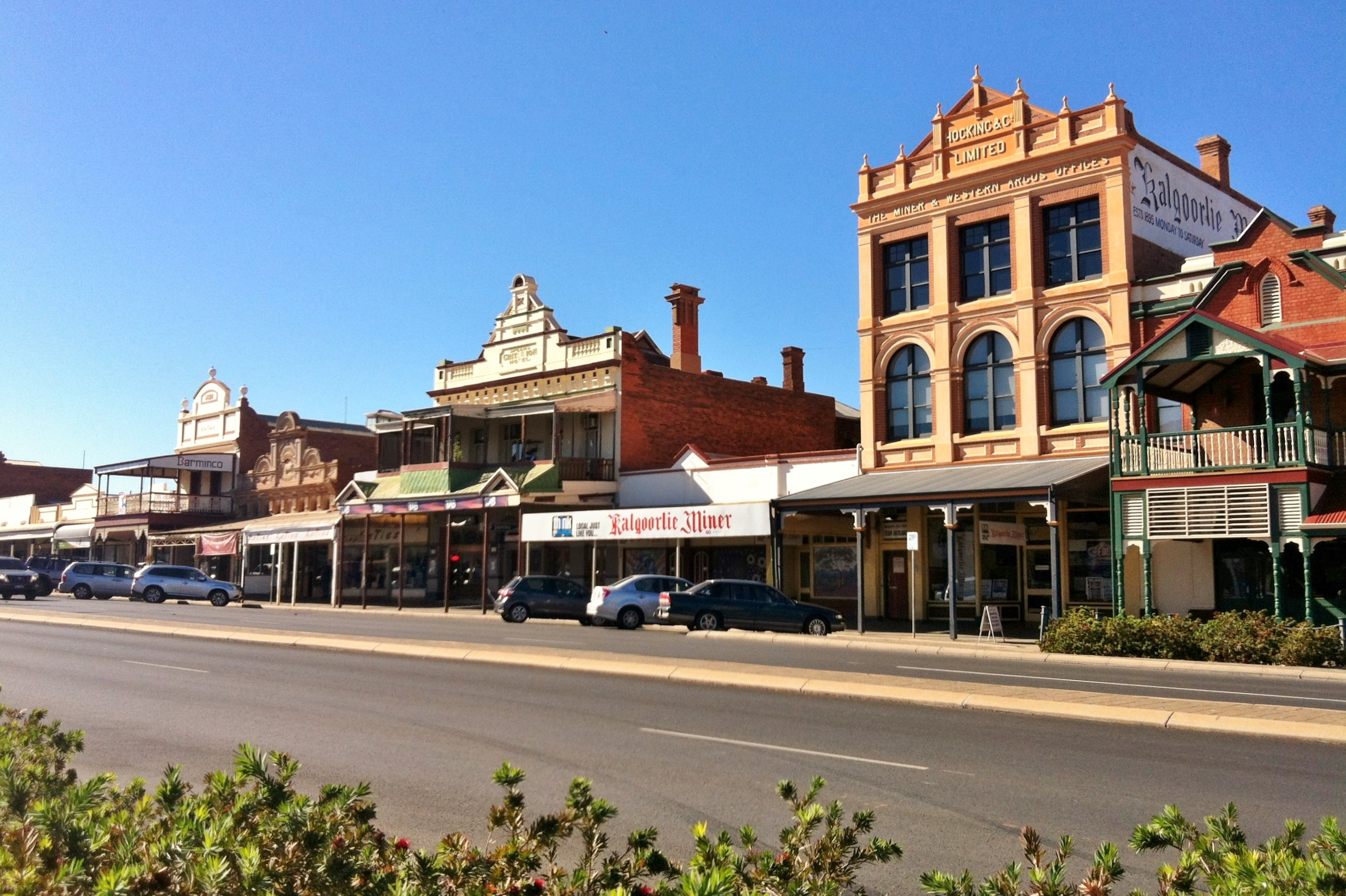
Hannan Street; Kalgoorlie's main street

=== Arts ===
Kalgoorlie–Boulder has many arts organisations and practising artists.

=== Sports ===
Kalgoorlie–Boulder's location, being roughly 600 km from Perth, enjoys high levels of participation in Australian rules football (the Goldfields Football League), netball, basketball, rugby league, soccer, field hockey, and cricket. Other popular sports in Kalgoorlie include tennis, lawn bowls, roller derby, rugby union, and swimming.

Kalgoorlie also has an international squash tournament held every year at the YMCA.

In a statewide sense, the semiprofessional Goldfields Giants basketball team competes in the State Basketball League, and were league champions in 2007 and 2008.

The Goldfields Titans play in the Western Australia Rugby League Harvey Norman Premiership state rugby league competition. Home games are at the Oasis playing fields on Saturday afternoons.

Horse racing is also very popular in the city, and Kalgoorlie–Boulder is home to the internationally recognised annual "Race Round".

Every year the annual Kalgoorlie Desert Race is held. It is a gruelling off-road race.

=== Attractions ===
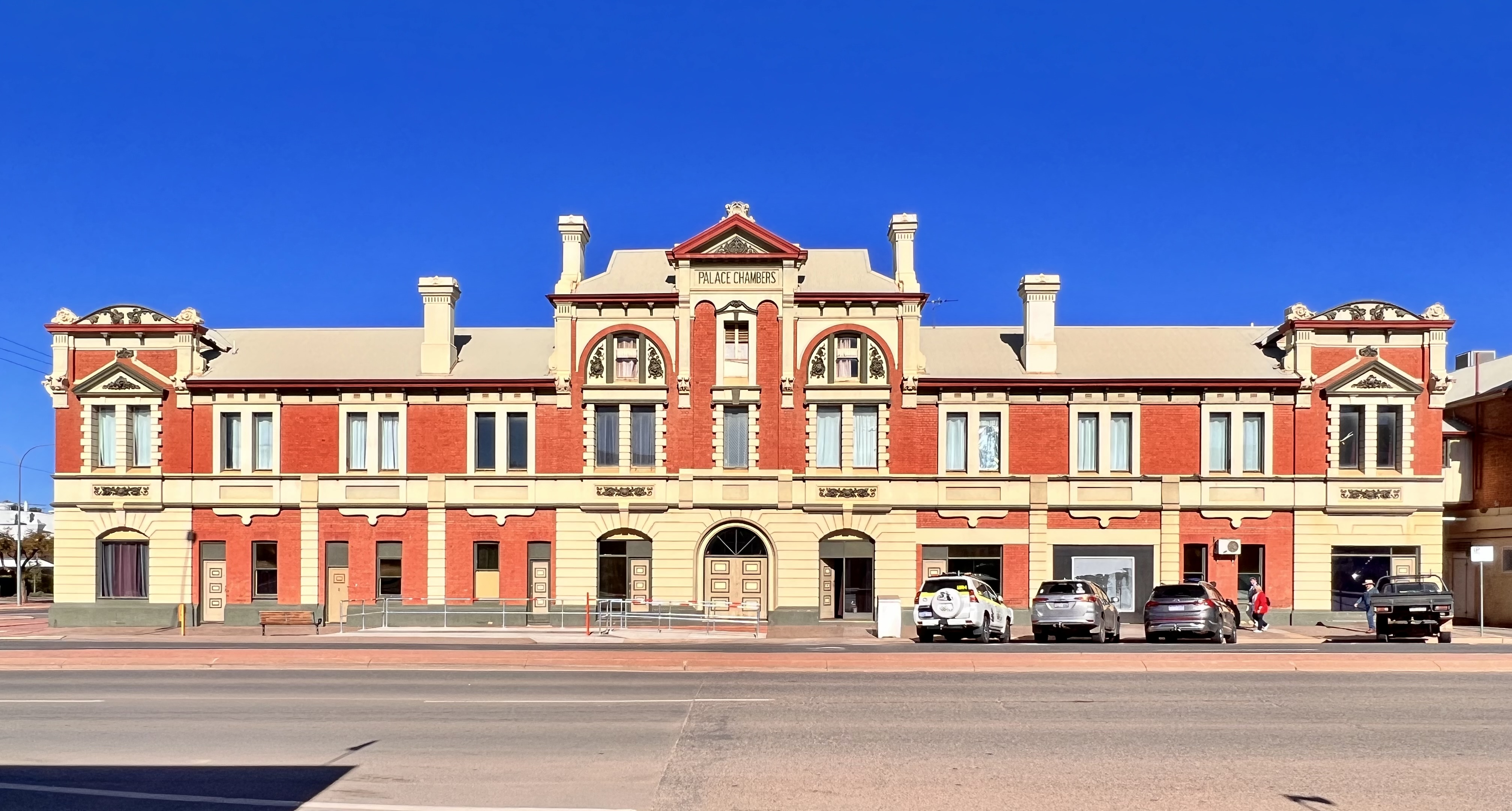
Palace Chambers

Given the wealth of its yesteryear, Kalgoorlie features many elaborate heritage buildings that have been retained. Kalgoorlie–Boulder – the largest settlement for many hundreds of kilometres, with many employees at the Super Pit – is the centre of the area's social life. Of particular interest is the Kalgoorlie–Boulder Racecourse, a horse racing venue. Two grass sports ovals and a cinema showing recent international releases are in the area.

Well known in the area are the Kalgoorlie, Geraldton, Perth, and Albany skimpy barmaids, mostly flown in, employed by pubs like Exchange Hotel, who walk around "scantily clad" in bikini, lingerie or burlesque outfits to attract punters and who expect a fee in return.

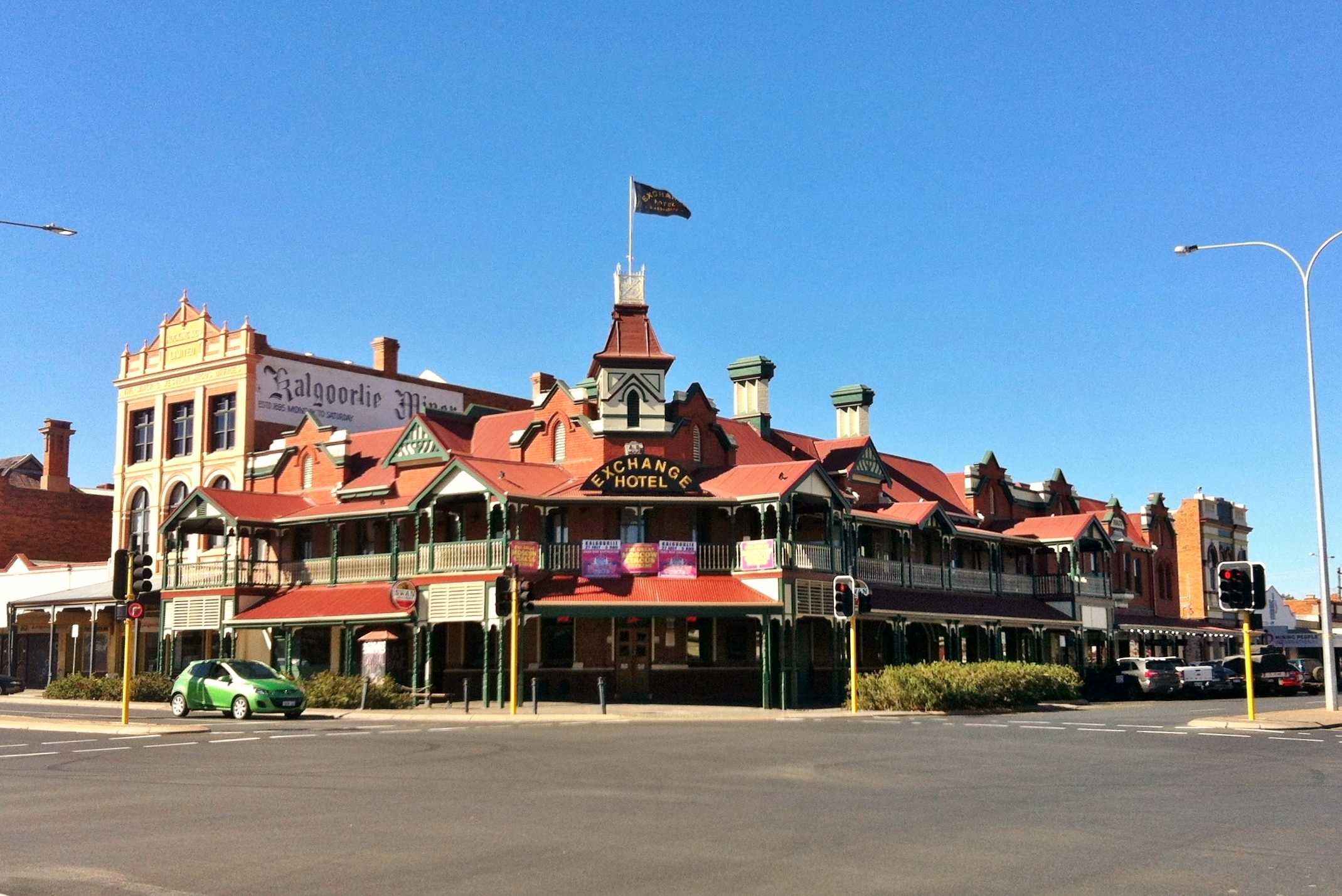
The landmark Exchange Hotel

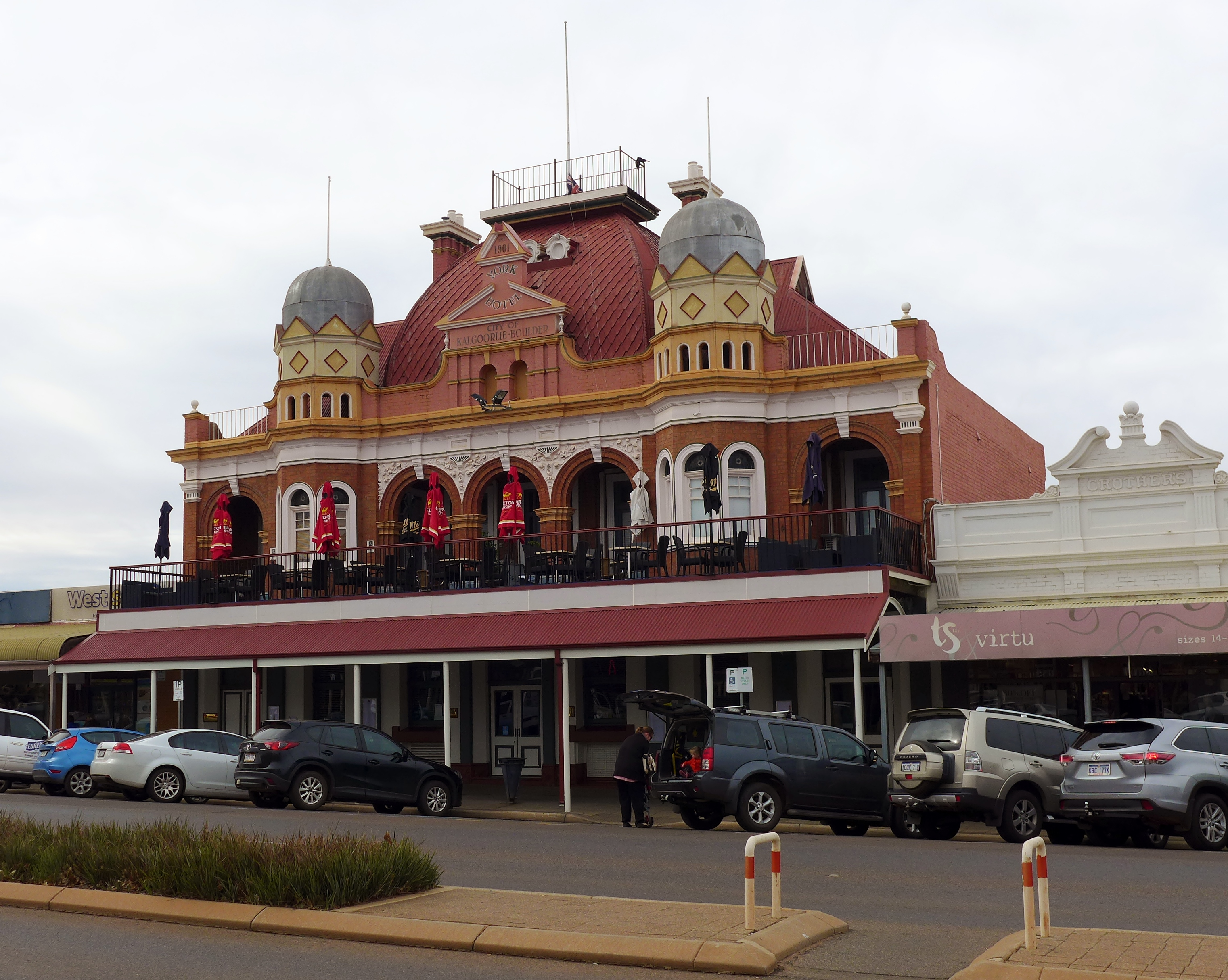
York Hotel

=== Historic hotels ===
Kalgoorlie has historical hotels still in operation:

- Broken Hill Hotel – iconic venue in Boulder
- Exchange Hotel, Kalgoorlie – situated at Kalgoorlie's main intersection
- Kalgoorlie Hotel – opposite the Kalgoorlie town hall
- Palace Hotel – also situated at Kalgoorlie's main intersection
- Piccadilly Hotel – suburban pub north of the Kalgoorlie CBD
- Recreation Hotel – a two-storied hotel in Boulder
- York Hotel – a state heritage listed hotel on Hannan Street

Many hotels have been put to private use, including:

- Cornwall Hotel, Boulder, extensively damaged during 1934 riots
- Mount Lyell (refurbished as a restaurant 2004, currently a Nando's restaurant)

Hotels that have disappeared from the city include:

- Boulder Block (demolished 1991) (Removed due to Super Pit expansion. This pub had a mine shaft so underground workers could access it.)
- Commercial Hotel (burnt down 3 November 1978)
- Fimiston Hotel (demolished February 1980)
- Foundry Hotel (closed 2005 – damaged by fire 3 July 2008, deliberately lit on fire in 2009, Burnt to the ground 2012)
- Glendevon Hotel (burnt down 1986)
- Golden Eagle (The collapsed balcony of the Golden Eagle hotel on the corner of Lane and Wittenoom St in Boulder.) Damaged by fire then demolished in 2012
- Home from Home Family hotel (burnt in the riots of 1934)
- Oriental Hotel (demolished July 1972)

== Suburbs ==
The Kalgoorlie–Boulder metropolitan area consists of the following suburbs:

- Boulder

Known as the home of the Super Pit, it is one of Kalgoorlie–Boulder's historical suburbs featuring many buildings and landmarks dating as far back as 1882. It was once the central business district for the Town of Boulder, but since amalgamation with Kalgoorlie, it is now more of a historical local centre. Boulder has its own post office, town hall and many hotels along its main thoroughfare, Burt Street. A significant refurbishment has been commenced as part of the 'Royalties for Regions' initiative.

- Broadwood (aka – Hampton Heights)

A new housing suburb located next to the Kalgoorlie–Boulder Airport, which was recently expanded.

- Fairways

This area derives its name from the golf course that once occupied the area. It was released to provide affordable property to a growing population in Kalgoorlie–Boulder. Fairways features a private primary school, church, caravan park and small business.

- Golden Grove (formerly Adeline)

Adeline was originally constructed around 1970 by the State Housing Commission. The suburb was built on the "Radburn concept", with houses facing away from the street and common pathways linking homes. The area has been plagued by antisocial problems. In 2003, a significant urban renewal project was commenced, including the renaming of the suburb to Golden Grove and re-aligning of homes. The project has seen some success but has yet to fully eliminate antisocial problems within the area.

- Hampton Heights

See Broadwood.

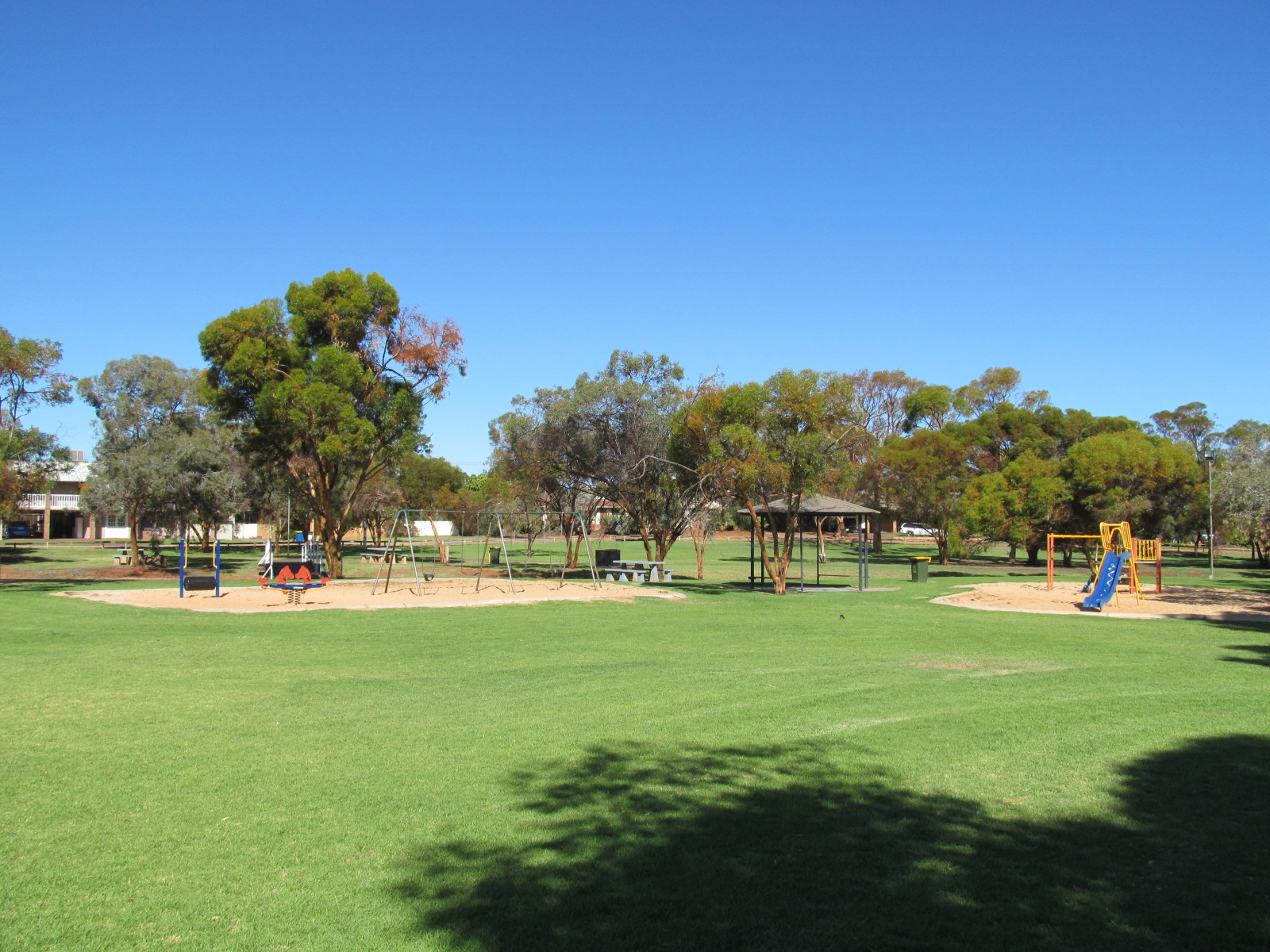
- Finnerty Park, Hannans
  Hannans

Located in Kalgoorlie's far north. Hannans was the first suburb to have its own independent shopping centre ("Hannans Boulevard") which includes a IGA SuperMarket (formally Coles supermarket). The area also has a primary school and an 18-hole golf course. The original course was not formally grassed but was recently refurbished. Several surrounding golf clubs joined together to form one club known as 'The Goldfields Golf Club'. A dam has been constructed to service what is now a luxury desert golf course and club. Alongside the golf course project has been the development and release of Greenview estate. It lies on the western border of Hannans. This ongoing project has been designed as an environmentally friendly estate, and will eventually consist of over 2000 homes, apartments and facilities such as parks and schools. As one of Kalgoorlie's highest growth areas there has been a proposal for a new alternative route, out of the suburb onto the Kalgoorlie Bypass, to avoid traffic problems on the already heavily used Graeme Street which is a direct route to the city centre. Other developments include 'Karkurla Rise' and 'Karkurla View' which have added an additional 400 homes to the area.

- Kalgoorlie

The central business district. Hannan Street, named after Paddy Hannan, is Kalgoorlie's main street and stretches the length of the suburb. The western side of the suburb consists of housing and some light industry. The eastern side contains retail chains, banks, the police station, court house, restaurants, hotels, tourist attractions, schools, university, and a TAFE.

- Lamington

One of Kalgoorlie's oldest suburbs. Much like other older suburbs, almost every street is parallel with Hannan Street in Central Kalgoorlie. Streets are noticeably wide. It houses North Kalgoorlie Primary School, small businesses, a medical practice, a hotel, tavern and a non-maintained 18-hole golf course.

- Mullingar

Much smaller today than it originally was before the Super Pit expansion, Mullingar is located at the far east end of Lamington, between the northern Goldfields railway and Goldfields Highway.

- O'Connor

Officially O'Connor is the south-east section of the suburb of Somerville. Much of the area is increasingly now known as O'Connor. It is home to a primary school (O'Connor Primary School), a private high school (Goldfields Baptist College), and shopping facilities. It also houses the city's only recreation centre.

- Piccadilly

A narrow suburb following Piccadilly street between Central Kalgoorlie and Lamington. It features the city's regional hospital, small businesses, a hotel, sporting arena and two grassed ovals.

- Somerville

Somerville marks the end of Great Eastern Highway that stretches between Kalgoorlie–Boulder and Perth. Much of the area is now referred to locally as O'Connor. Somerville contains a residential area, schools, retail shops, light industry and some horse stables. In the past it also contained market gardens.

- South Kalgoorlie

Stretching from Boundary Street, Kalgoorlie to Holmes Street, Golden Grove and bordering with Central Kalgoorlie, O'Connor and Golden Grove, South Kalgoorlie is mostly residential but also contains the Kalgoorlie–Boulder Racecourse, schools, some light industrial and small businesses. The suburb was expanded in the mid-1990s to include a sub-division named "Sport of Kings" on Maxwell Street, using a surplus of land from the racecourse.

- Victory Heights

A residential-only subdivision within Fairways estate along Burt Street.

- West Kalgoorlie

Kalgoorlie's main industrial area, it is the first suburb as you approach Kalgoorlie on the Great Eastern Highway. It features the city's airport, as well as small, medium, and heavy industrial areas. Currently under expansion further west (ANZAC Drive Industrial Estate).

- West Lamington

The western tip of Lamington was built in the 1980s. It includes one shop, sporting facilities and an arboretum nature reserve.

- Williamstown

This small existing area features mostly housing with one small primary school. It is also home to the Mount Charlotte gold mine (past production of about 5,000,000 ounces of gold), the Cassidy Shaft and Nanny Goat Hill (Mt Gleddon). Kalgoorlie Consolidated Gold Mines, owner of the Super Pit to the south on the Golden Mile, from 2015 mined the Hidden Secret orebody, between 215 metres (705 ft) and 440 metres (1,440 ft) below the surface of Williamstown, using Mount Charlotte's Cassidy Shaft as access.

== Transport ==
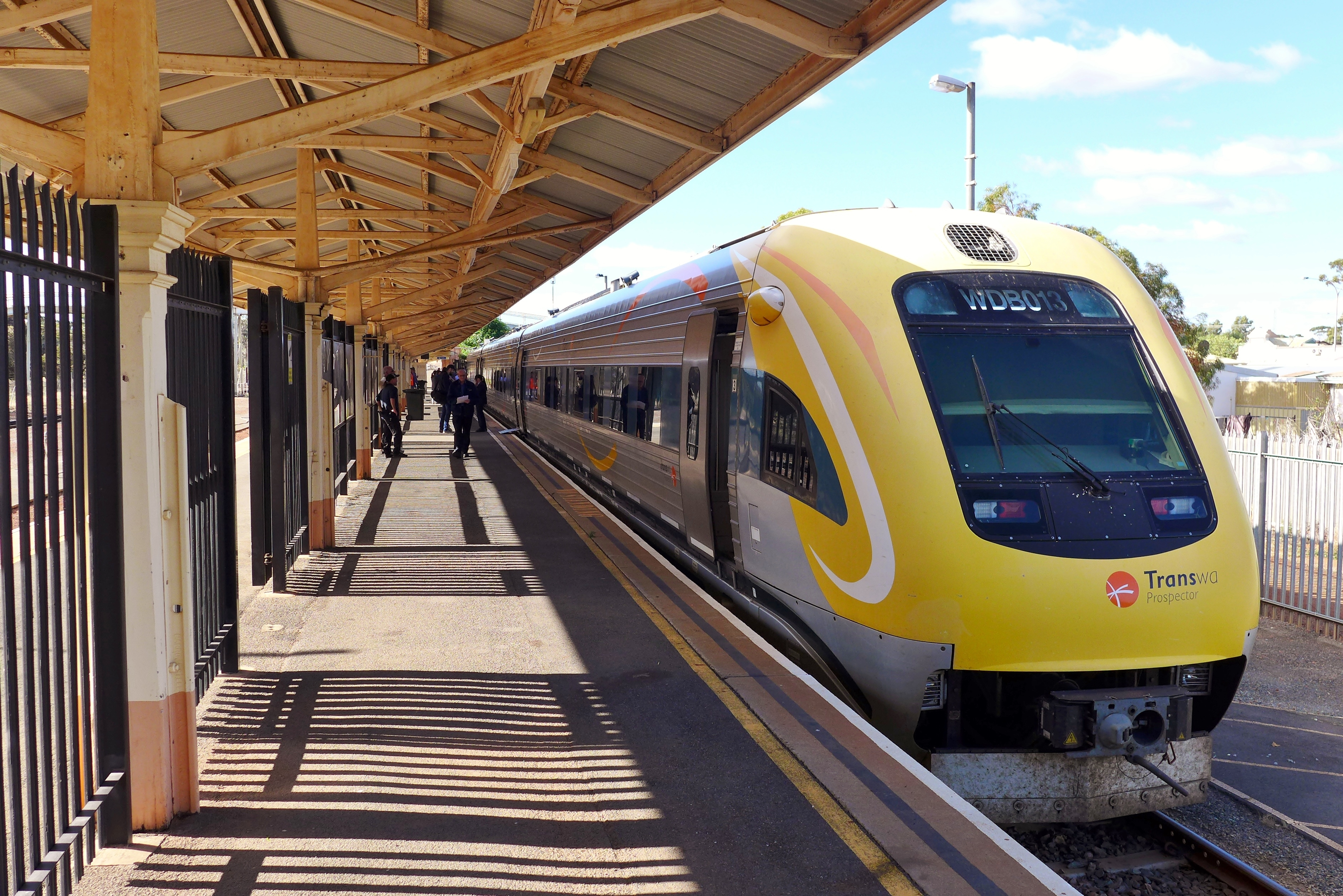
Kalgoorlie railway station

=== Rail ===
The town is located on the main Eastern Goldfields Railway. Transwa's Prospector operates once to twice daily passenger train services from Kalgoorlie to Perth. The Indian Pacific also stops here, operating weekly in each direction between Perth and Sydney.

=== Buses ===
Town bus services are provided by TransGoldfields, there are three town routes as well as school services. Transwa also operates road coaches that service the town.

=== Air ===
Commercial air services connect Kalgoorlie–Boulder with Melbourne and Perth, operating out of the Kalgoorlie–Boulder Airport. Airlines that provide regular flights include Alliance Airlines, Qantas, QantasLink and Virgin Australia. There is a locally owned and operated charter company with a flight school, Goldfields Air Services.

=== Road ===
Kalgoorlie is linked to Perth by the Great Eastern Highway, and is also on the Goldfields Highway.

== Media ==
Radio

Radio Services available in Kalgoorlie:

- ABC Goldfields: 6GF 648 AM / 94.3 FM (Part of the ABC Local Radio network)
- ABC Classic: 6ABCFM 95.5 FM;
- Radio National: 6ABCRN 97.1 FM
- Triple J: 6JJJ 93.5 FM / 98.7 FM
- ABC News: 6PNN 100.3 FM
- Hit 97.9 (Commercial Station) 6KAR: 91.9 / 97.9 FM – Contemporary hit radio format
- Triple M (Commercial Station) 6KG: 981 AM / 92.7 FM – Adult Contemporary / Classic Hits / Talk radio format
- Vision Radio Network 1431 AM: Community Narrowcast Station – Christian praise, worship music and talk.
- Tjuma Pulka (Media) Aboriginal Corporation: 96.3 FM (Aboriginal Community radio service)
- 6TAB Racing Radio – 88FM (Live broadcasts of Horse Racing, Greyhound Racing and Harness Racing, with talkback and music played at other times).

Television

Television services available include:

- The Australian Broadcasting Corporation (ABC) – ABC TV, ABC Family/ABC Kids, ABC Entertains, ABC News (digital channels)
- The Special Broadcasting Service (SBS) – SBS, SBS2, SBS World Movies, SBS Food, NITV (digital channels)
- Seven, an owned and operated station of the Seven Network
- WIN Television, an affiliate station of the Nine Network
- West Digital Television, an affiliate station of the Network 10 (provided jointly by Seven Media Group and WIN Television)

The programming schedule is mainly the same as the Seven, Nine and Ten stations in Perth with variations for news bulletins, sport telecasts such as the Australian Football League and National Rugby League, children's and lifestyle programs and infomercials or paid programming.

Seven maintains a newsroom in the city. The Seven bureau provides coverage of the surrounding area for the station's nightly 30-minute local news program, Seven News, at 5:30pm on weeknights.

A Foxtel subscription television service is available via satellite.

Newspapers

The local newspaper for the Kalgoorlie–Boulder and Goldfields region is The Kalgoorlie Miner.

Newspapers from Perth, including The West Australian and The Sunday Times, are also available, as well as national newspapers such as The Australian and the Australian Financial Review.

== Education ==
There are 10 primary schools, four high schools and one university in the Kalgoorlie–Boulder area.

=== Primary schools ===
- Boulder Primary School
- East Kalgoorlie Primary School
- Goldfields Baptist College (private)
- Hannans Primary School
- Kalgoorlie Primary School
- Kalgoorlie School of the Air
- North Kalgoorlie Primary School
- O'Connor Primary School
- O'Connor Education Support Centre
- Saint Joseph's Primary School (private)
- Saint Mary's Primary School (Kalgoorlie Catholic Primary School) (private)
- South Kalgoorlie Primary School

=== High schools ===
- Eastern Goldfields College (formerly the Eastern Goldfields Senior High School Senior Campus)
- Eastern Goldfields Education Support Centre
- John Paul College (formerly Prendiville College & Christian Brothers College (amalgamated)) (private)
- Kalgoorlie–Boulder Community High School (formerly the Eastern Goldfields Senior High School Middle School Campus)
- Goldfields Baptist College (Year K–10) (private)

=== Universities ===
- Curtin University of Technology – Kalgoorlie Campus (includes the Western Australian School of Mines and Curtin VTEC; formerly Kalgoorlie College)
- University of Western Australia and University of Notre Dame Australia – Rural Clinical School of Western Australia

== Notable people ==
Notable people from or who have lived in Kalgoorlie include:

- Kate Atkinson, actress, voice artist, theatre actor
- Thomas Axford, VC, First World War recipient of the Victoria Cross
- Matt Birney, former WA Leader of the Opposition
- John Bowler, Australian politician from Western Australia
- Graeme Campbell, Australian politician, represented the seat of Kalgoorlie from 1980 to 1998
- John Carroll, VC, First World War recipient of the Victoria Cross
- Leonard Casley, founder of the Hutt River Province.
- Mackenzie Clinch Hoycard, basketball player
- John Cornell, actor and movie producer, best known for playing Strop on The Paul Hogan Show
- Wendy Duncan, Australian politician from Western Australia
- Rica Erickson (1908–2009), historian, botanist and author
- Dean Fiore, V8 supercar driver
- Brian Hayes, British radio personality
- Royce Hunt, rugby league player
- Sophie Garbin, Netball player for the Australian Diamonds and Collingwood Magpies
- Steve Johnston, speedway rider
- Eileen Joyce, pianist
- Dean Kemp, former Australian rules footballer
- Wallace Kyle, Air Marshall, last leader of RAF Bomber Command
- Walter Lindrum, champion professional billiards player
- Ron Manners, prominent ex–local businessperson
- Barry Marshall (born 1951), Nobel Prize winner
- Bob Marshall, champion billiards player
- Anthony Martin, racing driver
- Zaneta Mascarenhas, Labor member for Swan
- Fleur McIntyre, basketball coach with the Sydney Kings in the NBL
- Bert Nankiville, swimmer
- Gladys Agness Newton (1901–1988) was born here at Paddington. Founded the Slow Learning Children’s Group of Western Australia.
- Michael Patrizi, V8 supercar driver
- James del Piano, businessman, Italian diaspora aficionado
- William Pike, jockey
- Melissa Price, Liberal member for Durack
- Tim Rogers, singer/songwriter
- Dom Sheed, Australian rules footballer
- Grant Stewart, cricketer
- Jenny Talia, singer/songwriter
- Ian Taylor, Deputy Premier of Western Australia 1990–1993
- Diana Temple (1925–2006), pharmacologist
- Elizabeth Truswell (born 1941), former Chief Scientist at the Australian Geological Survey Organisation
- Christian de Vietri, artist
- Terry Walsh, field hockey striker and coach
- Kevin Bloody Wilson, singer and comedian
- Lydia Williams, Australian soccer player

== Images ==
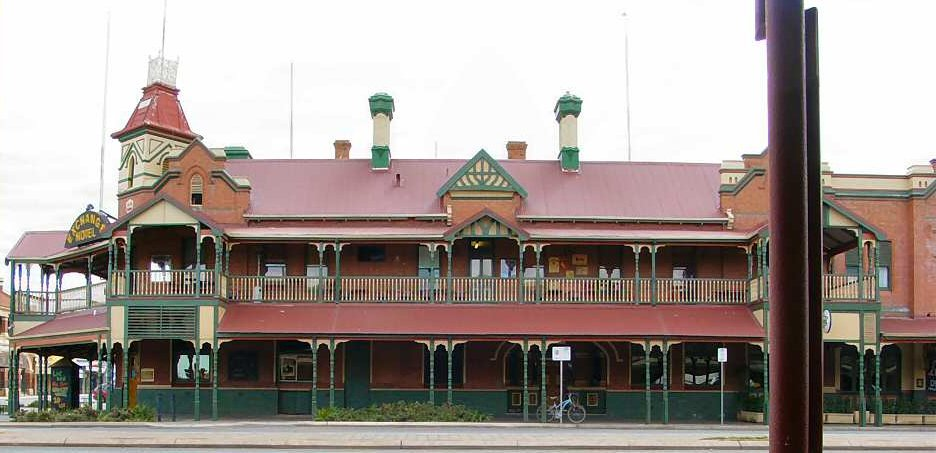
Exchange Hotel.

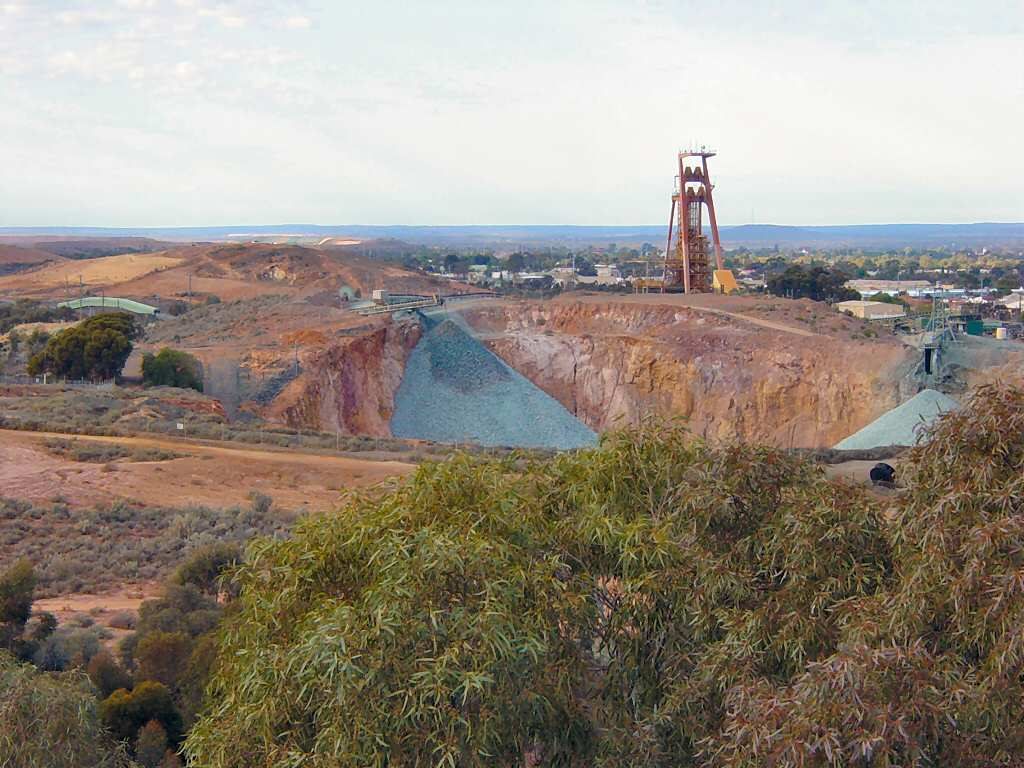
Mt Charlotte Mine and Cassidy Shaft, Williamstown.

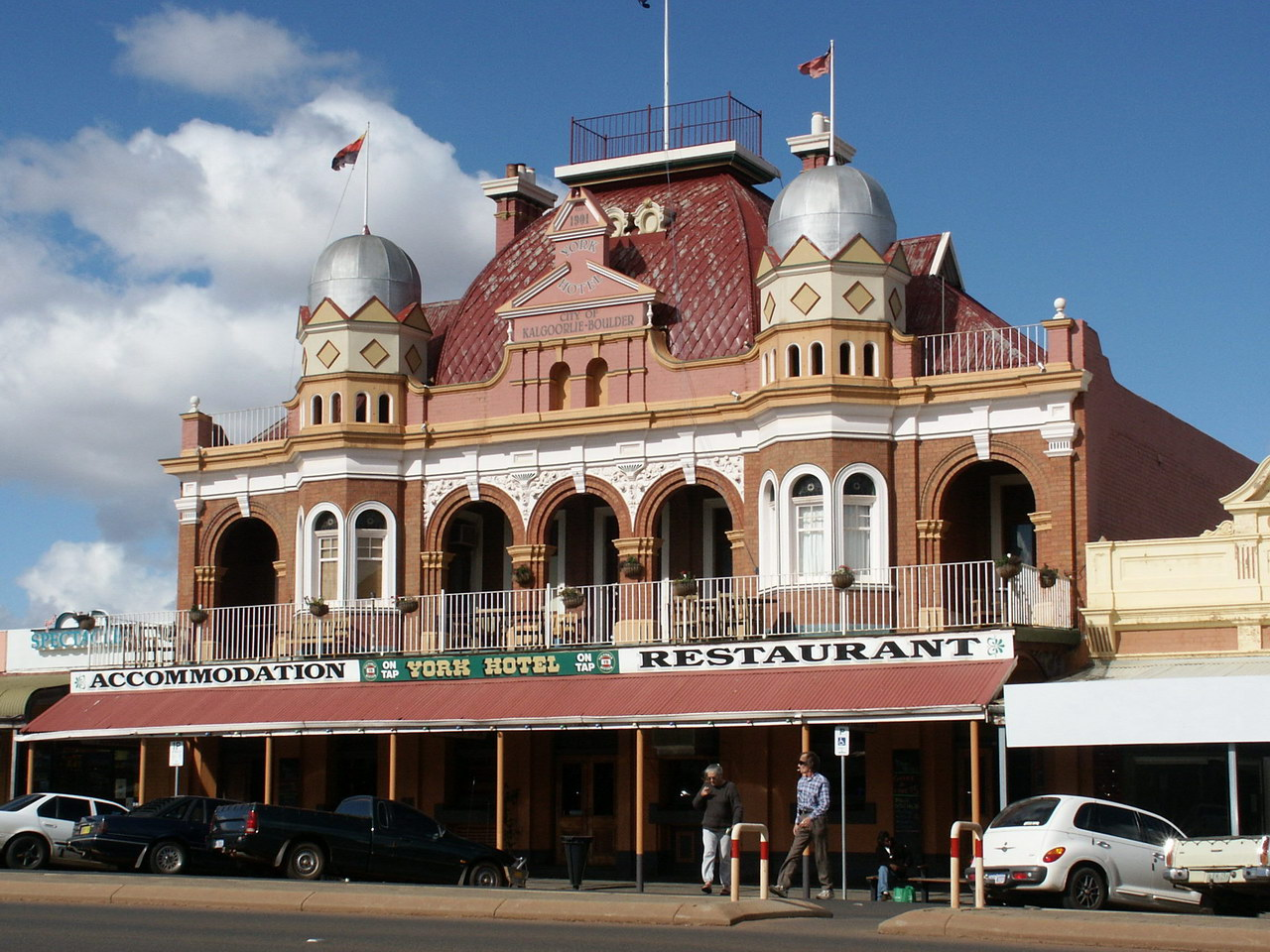
York Hotel.

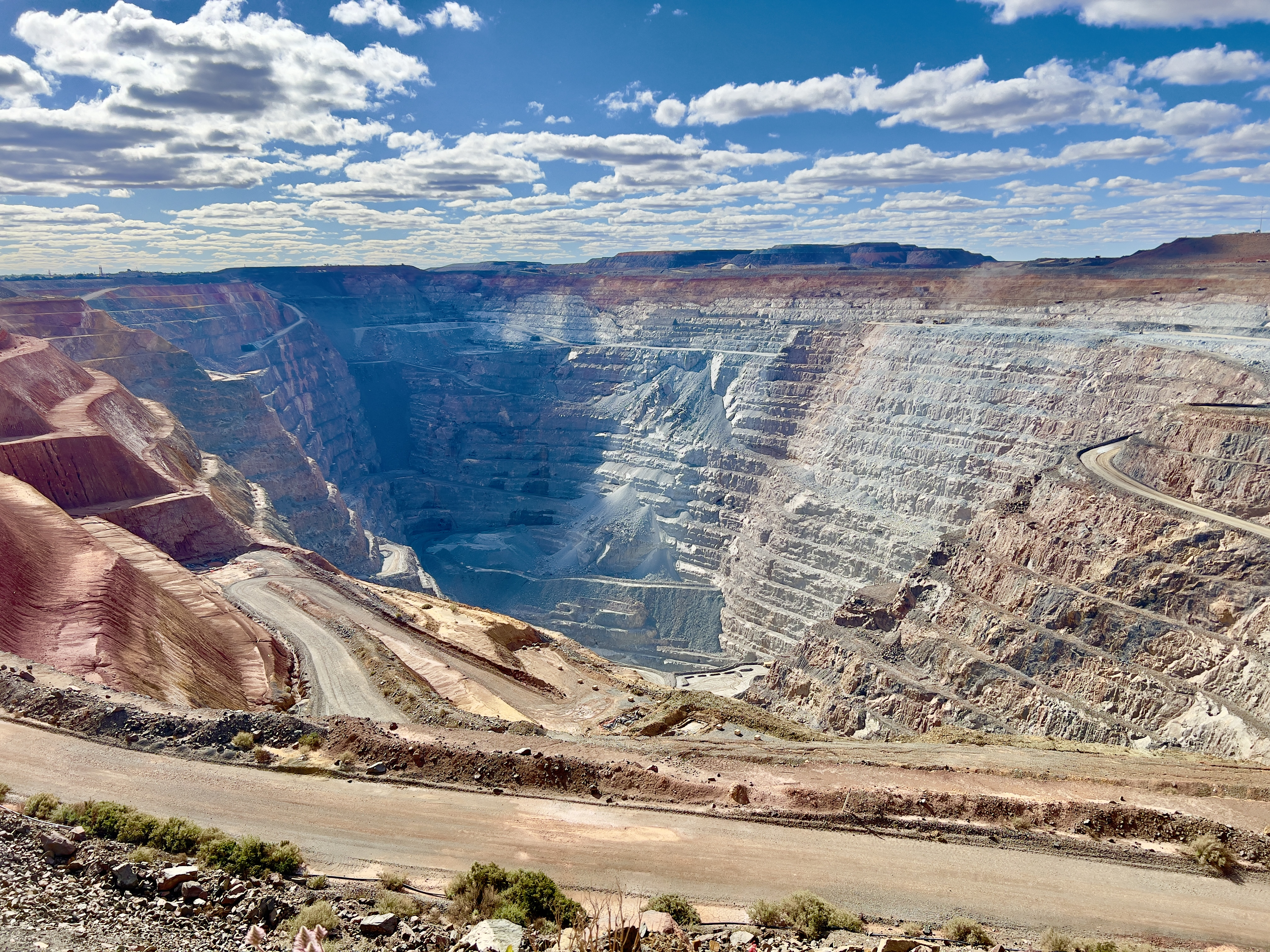
The Super Pit, Australia's largest open-cut gold mine until 2023.

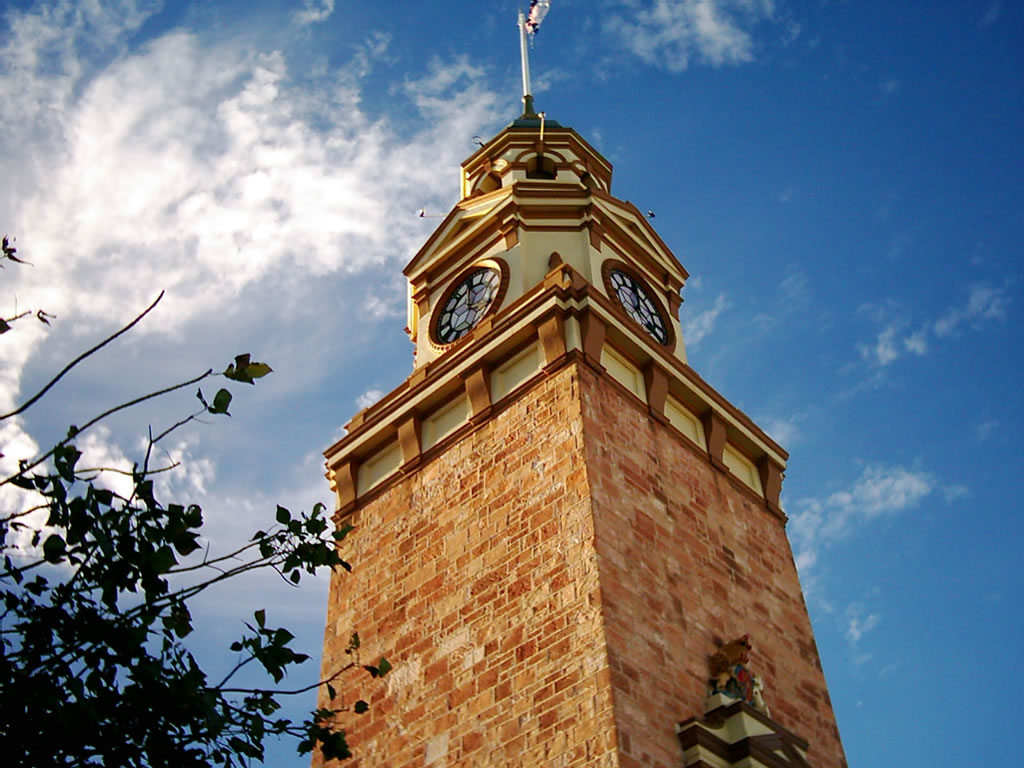
The Kalgoorlie Courthouse, previously the Post Office.

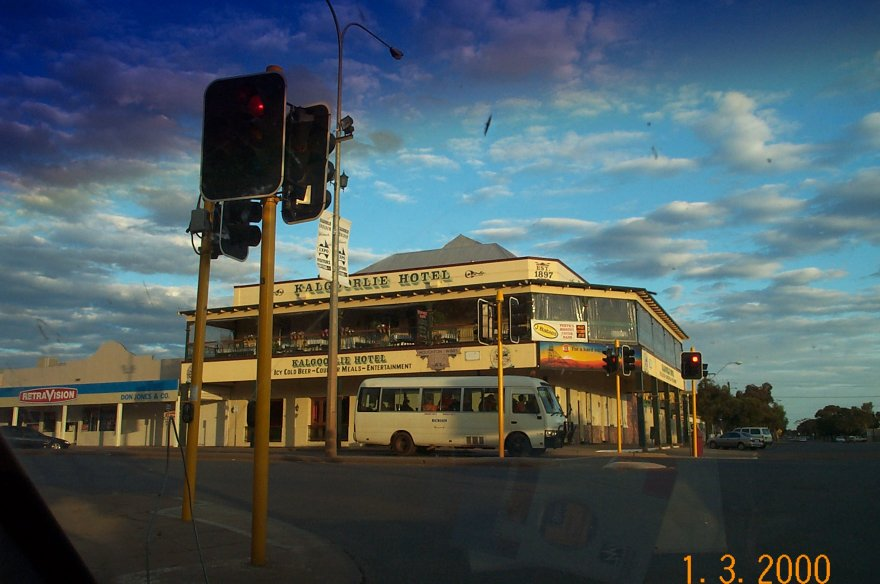
The Kalgoorlie Hotel/Judds Pub.

== See also ==
- Auralia (proposed Australian state with its capital in Kalgoorlie)
- Yilgarn craton
