= Home from Home Family hotel, Kalgoorlie =

Coordinates: 30.751545°S 121.467678°E

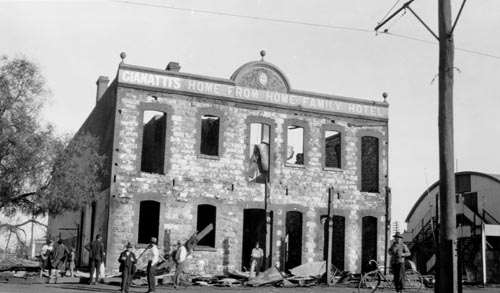

The Home from Home Family hotel was a hotel in Kalgoorlie, Western Australia.

== 1934 riot ==
It was one of a number of buildings that was burnt down during the riots in Kalgoorlie in 1934.

The hotel was also known at the time as Gianatti's.

The photo of the shell of the hotel is an often chosen image of the results of the riot.

The loss of the hotel and other buildings caught widespread attention, and subsequent investigation into the issues that started the riots.

== Other buildings destroyed ==
- The All Nations Hotel
- The Cornwall Hotel, Boulder
- Kalgoorlie Wine Saloon

== See also ==
- Civil disturbances in Western Australia
- Racial violence in Australia § Kalgoorlie Mines race riots
