= Gladys Agness Newton =

Australian charity founder (1901–1988)

- Born: Gladys Agness Miller; March 6, 1901; Kalgoorlie
- Died: November 24, 1988 (aged 87); Subiaco
- Known for: creating the Activ Foundation

Gladys Agness Newton born Gladys Agness Miller (March 6, 1901 – November 24, 1988) was an Australian community worker. She started the Slow Learning Children's Group which became the Activ Foundation and in 2023 it had over 2,000 employees.

== Life ==
Newton was born in 1901 in Paddington near Kalgoorlie. Her parents were Mabel Lucy (born Addicott) and Robert Henry Miller. Her father ran a shop. She left Kalgoorlie aged sixteen and she became a stenographer in Perth.

In 1948 she and her husband Arthur took their child from the school where he was being bullied. They enrolled him in a small class organised by the University of Western Australia's psychology department. Her son had his education there with other children who also had intellectual disabilities.

She called a meeting in 1951 that was attended by parents, like herself, of children with intellectual disabilities and from that meeting the Slow Learning Children's Group of Western Australia was formed. Gertrude Ruston became the group's president and served until 1954. Newton was the group's organising secretary. The group's core value was that their children were Australian citizens and the state had a duty of care. They believed that their children did not require mainstream schools but facilities where they could be trained. They wanted to see workshops and segregated schools for their children and, when they became adults, then again separate establishments.

Newton died in 1988 in Subiaco. In 1989 "Our children: a history of the Slow Learning Children's Group of WA, 1951–1988" was published written by Heather Hunt. The Slow Learning Children's Group became the Activ Foundation and it had over 2,000 employees in 2023. In 1967 her work was recognised during a debate at the Western Australian parliament.
