= York Hotel, Kalgoorlie =

Hotel in Kalgoorlie, Western Australia

York Hotel
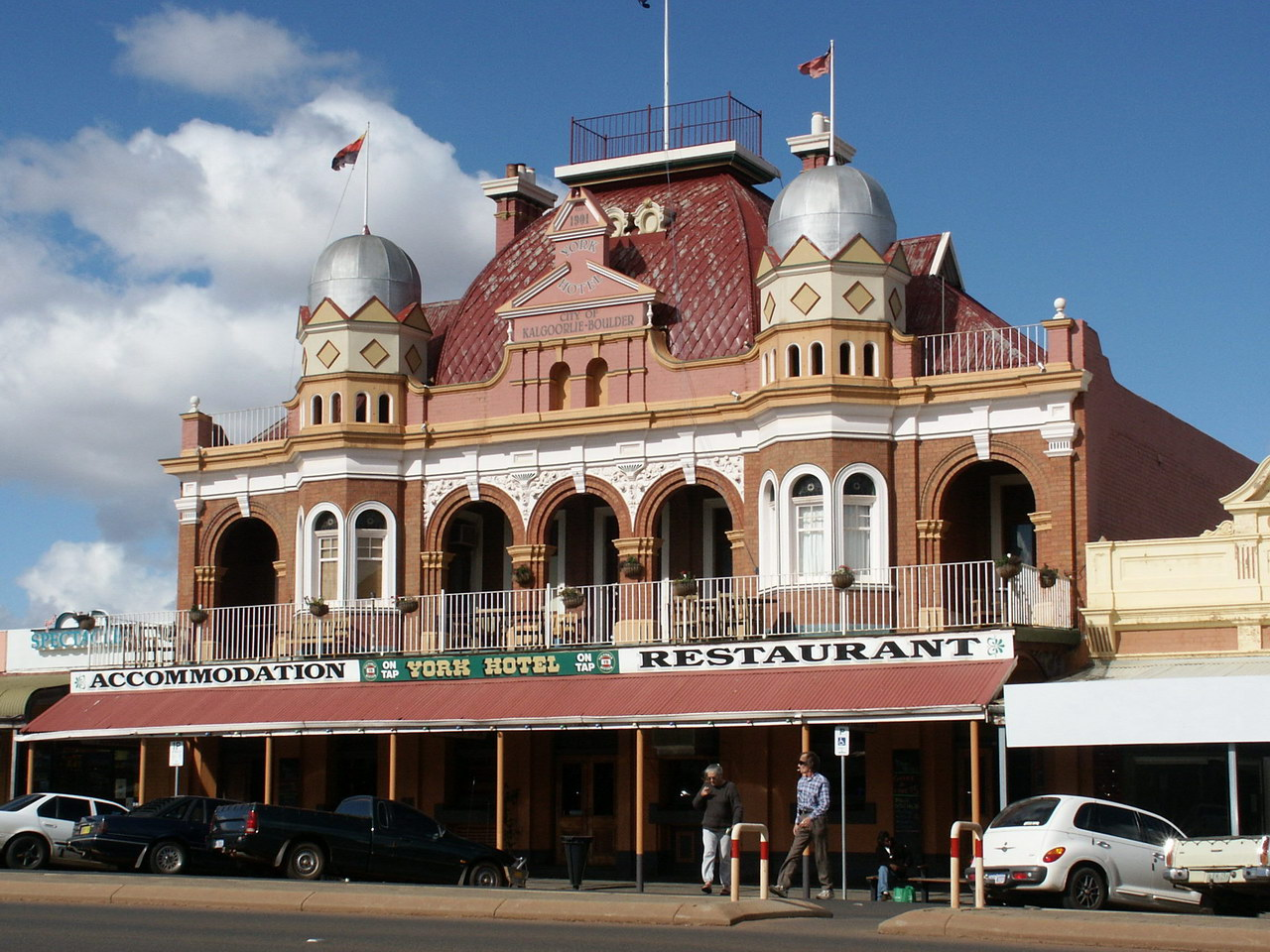
- Exterior of the York Hotel
- Interactive map of the York Hotel area

General information
- Type: Hotel
- Architectural style: Federation Anglo-Dutch architecture
- Location: 259 Hannan Street, Kalgoorlie, Western Australia
- Coordinates: 30°44′54″S 121°28′19″E
- Construction started: 1900
- Completed: 1901
- Opened: 23 February 1901
- Client: Mr Laslett

Technical details
- Floor count: 2

Design and construction
- Architect: Daniel T Edmunds

Website
- www.yorkhotel.com.au

Western Australia Heritage Register
- Type: State Registered Place
- Designated: 9 February 1996
- Reference no.: 1307

The York Hotel is a heritage hotel on Hannan Street, in Kalgoorlie, Western Australia.

== Location ==
The hotel is located at 259 Hannan Street, between Wilson and Cassidy Streets.

== History ==
The hotel was built by John Crothers in 1900–1901 for landlord and proprietor, Henry Edward Laslett. It was designed as a two-storey building in the Federation Anglo-Dutch style by architect Daniel T Edmunds, who also designed the City Markets, another historic landmark building in Kalgoorlie. The foundation stone was laid on 5 September 1900.

The hotel opened on 23 February 1901. It was leased to Peter McLachlan, who had previously served as the manager of McPhair's Hotel on Collins Street in Melbourne. The facade was renovated in 1974 and 1985.

It still serves as a hotel and a restaurant.

== Photographs ==
The hotel is one of the more photographed buildings in Kalgoorlie due to its design.

== Heritage value ==
The hotel was classified by the National Trust of Australia (WA) on 7 May 1977. It was also entered onto the Register of the National Estate by the Australian Heritage Commission on 21 October 1980. Additionally, it has been listed on the State Heritage Register since 9 February 1996.

In 1992, Australia Post featured the York Hotel on a postage stamp, as part of the Desert Gold set of four stamps commemorating the discovery of gold in Western Australia.

== Gallery ==
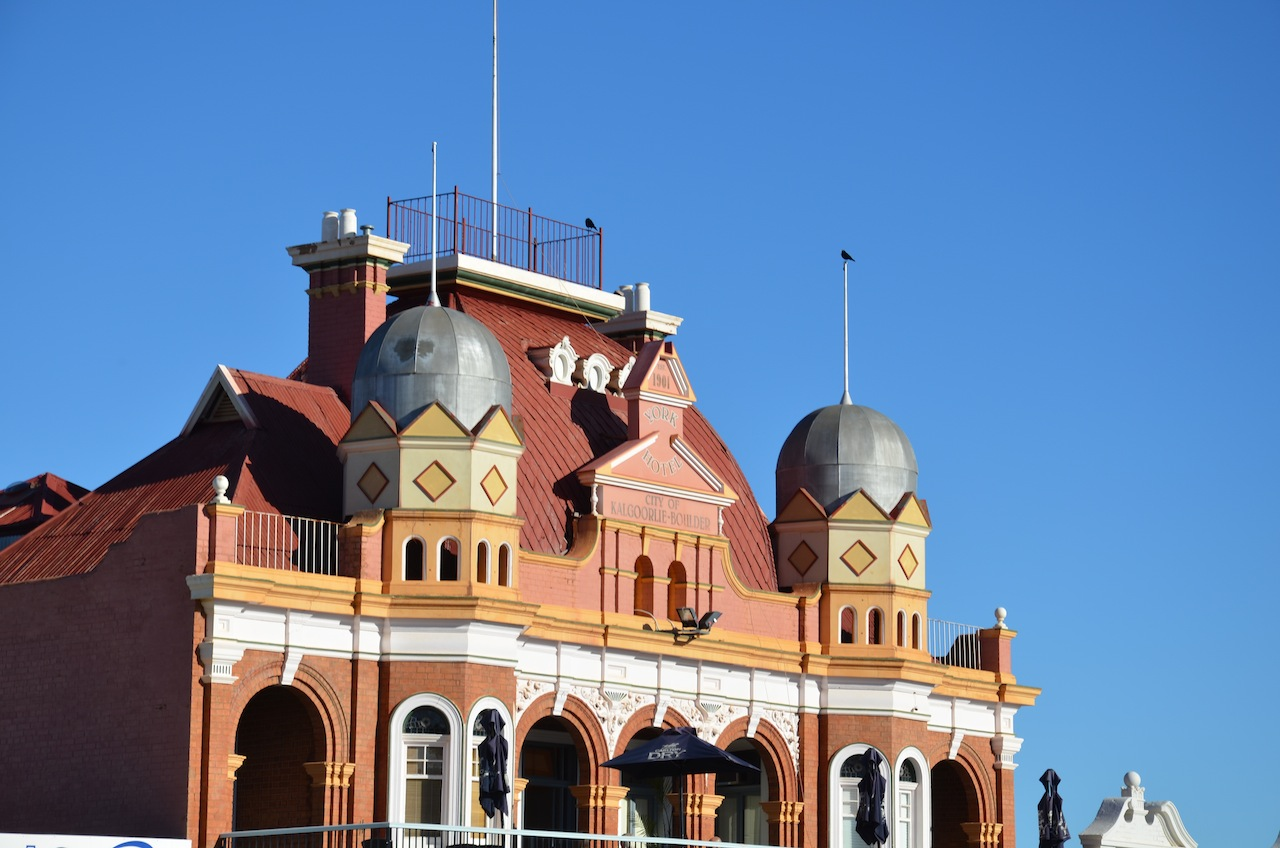
Architectural detail

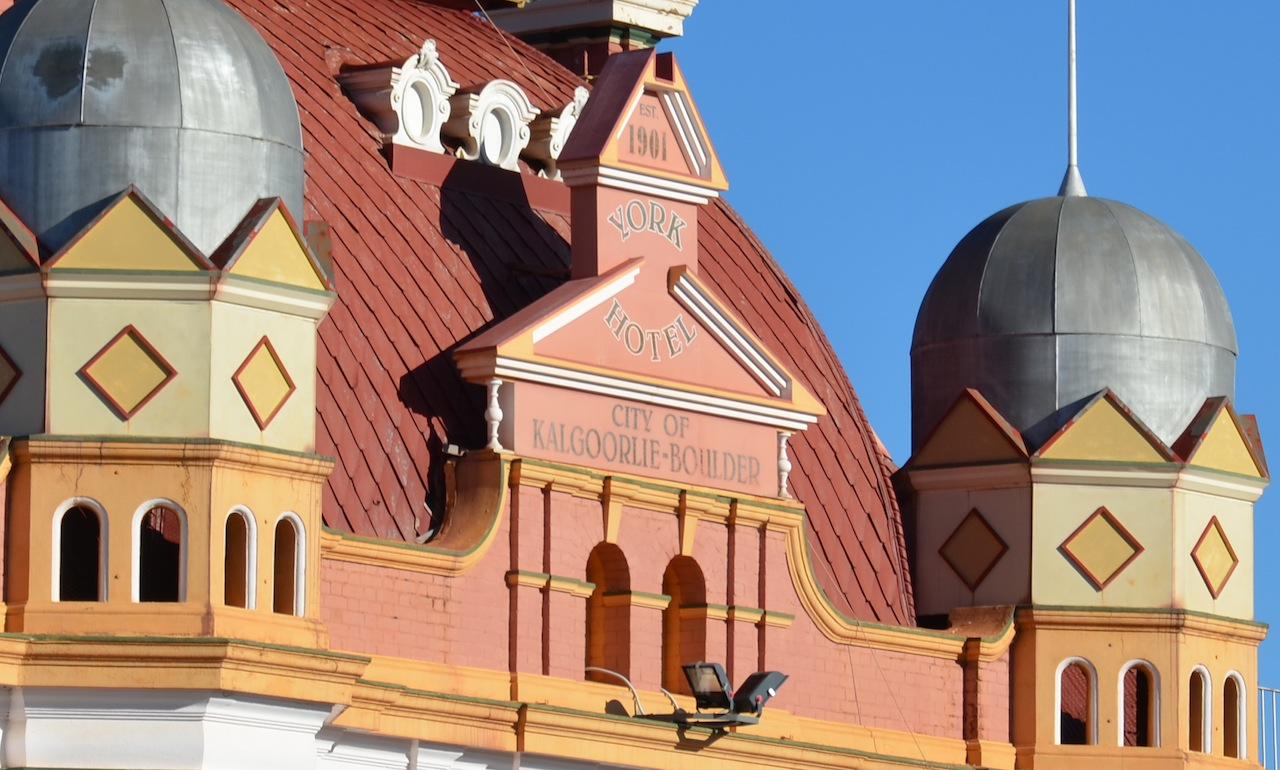
Architectural detail
