= Kalgoorlie Hotel =

Hotel on Hannan Street, Kalgoorlie, Western Australia

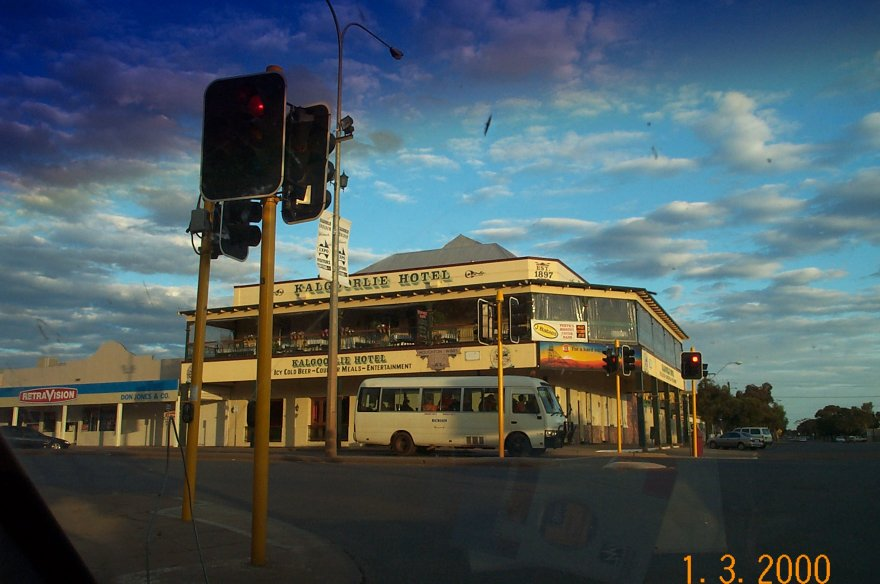
- Interactive map of the Kalgoorlie Hotel area

General information
- Type: Hotel
- Location: Corner of Hannan and Wilson Streets, 319 Hannan Street, Kalgoorlie, Western Australia
- Coordinates: 30.7492°S 121.4709°E

The Kalgoorlie Hotel is a historic hotel in Kalgoorlie, Western Australia.

== Location ==
It is located at 319 Hannan Street, Kalgoorlie. It has also been known as Judds Pub.

== History ==
Designed in the Federation architectural style, it was built from 1890 to 1915.
