= Exchange Hotel, Kalgoorlie =

Historic hotel building in Kalgoorlie, Western Australia

Exchange Hotel
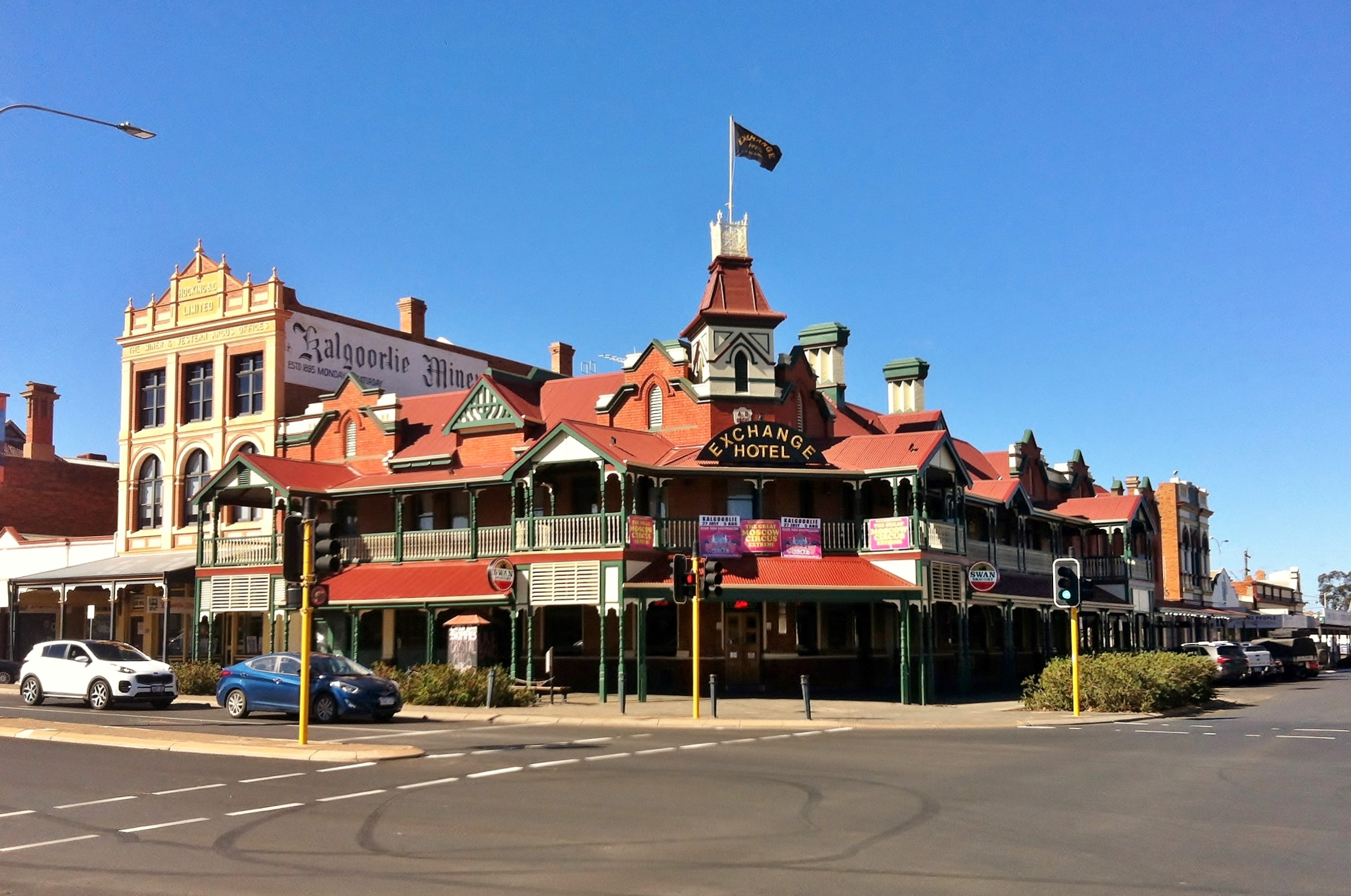
- The Exchange Hotel with the Kalgoorlie Miner building behind, on Hannan Street

General information
- Type: Hotel
- Architectural style: Federation Filigree
- Location: Corner of Hannan and Maritana Streets, 135 Hannan Street, Kalgoorlie, Western Australia
- Coordinates: 30.7460°S 121.4747°E

Design and construction
- Architecture firm: Hawkins and Spriggs

Western Australia Heritage Register
- Type: State Registered Place
- Designated: 10 January 2017
- Reference no.: 1289

The Exchange Hotel is a historic landmark hotel in Kalgoorlie, Western Australia.

== Location ==
The hotel is located on the corner of Hannan Street and Maritana Street in Kalgoorlie. It stands next door to the building of the Kalgoorlie Miner, the goldfields newspaper, and opposite the Palace Hotel.

== History ==
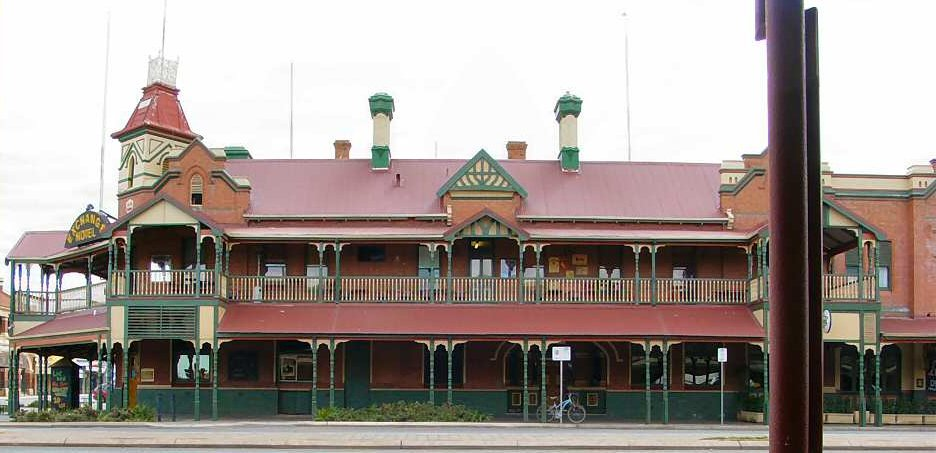
Exchange Hotel on Maritana Street

The hotel was built in 1900 for the Wilkie Brothers, contractors for the Southern Cross-Kalgoorlie railway line. They hired the construction team Shaw and Harcorn, and the architectural team Hawkins and Spriggs. It has two storeys and it made up of bricks, iron and a timber balustrade. It has a corner tower and corrugated galvanised iron gabled roof.

During the race riots of 1934, the hotel was purchased by Bill Trythall from the former owner, who had a foreign-sounding name. As a result, the building was saved from damage.

In 2011, it went into receivership as a result of declining clientele. In January 2013, it was purchased by a new owner. Their use of "skimpies", i.e. topless waitresses, is good for tourism.

== Heritage value ==
The hotel has been listed on the State Heritage Register since 1997.
