= Hannan Street, Kalgoorlie =

Road in Kalgoorlie, Western Australia

Hannan Street Western Australia
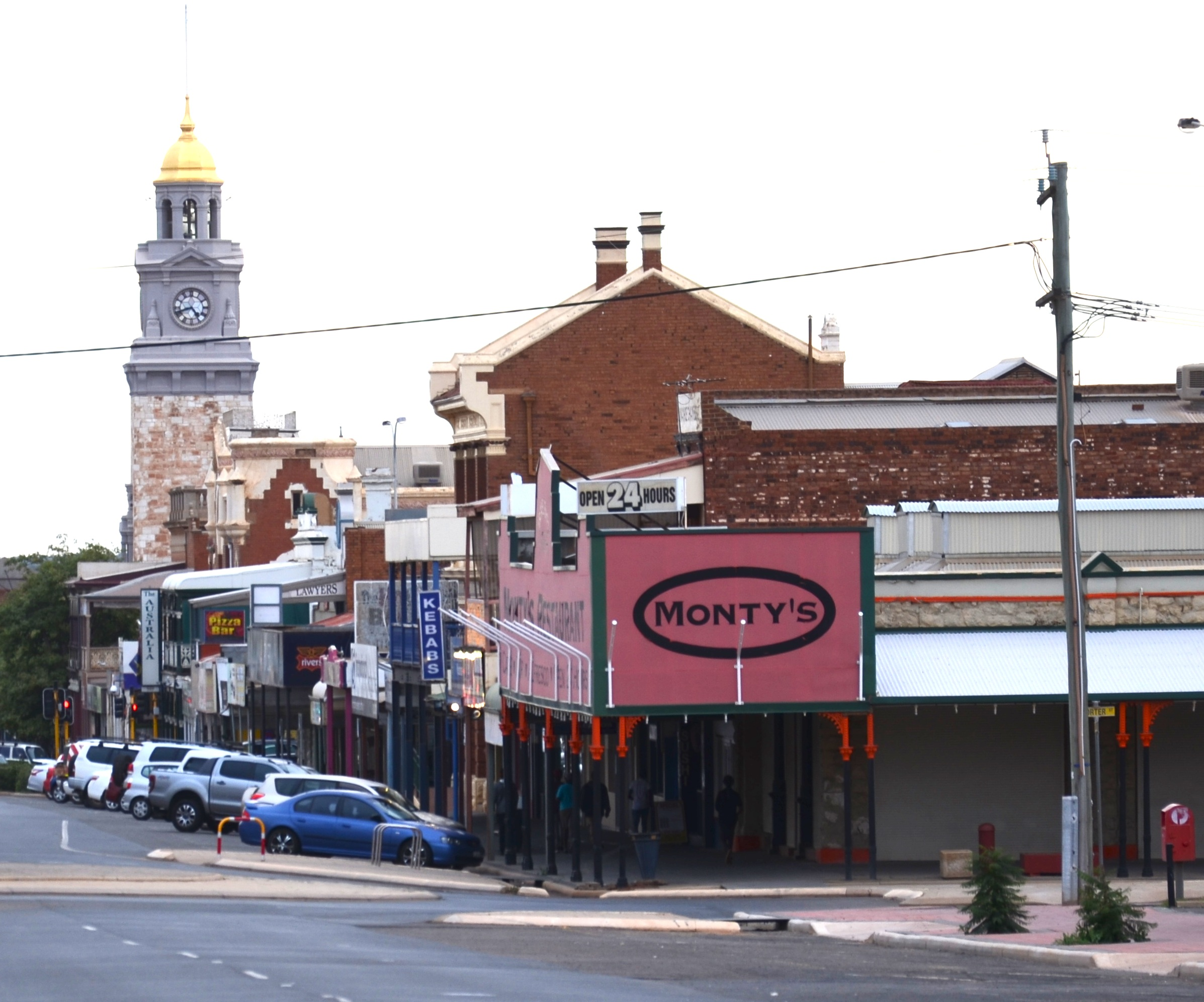
- Hannan Street

General information
- Type: Street
- Length: 3.2 km (2.0 mi)
- Route number(s): Great Eastern Highway

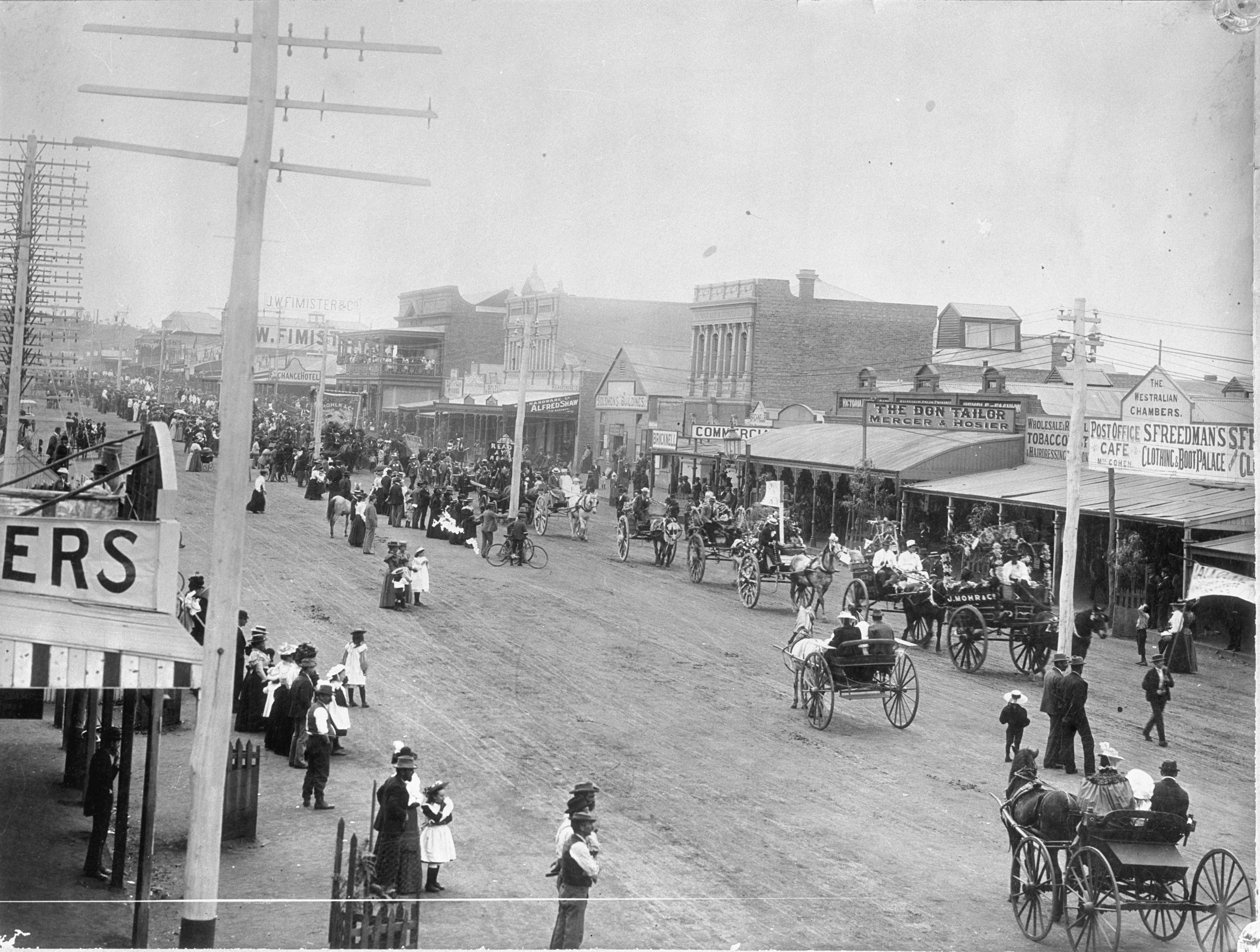
Hannan Street, Kalgoorlie, c. 1901. A crowd watches a parade.

Hannan Street is the main street in the goldfields town of Kalgoorlie, Western Australia, and the easternmost section of Great Eastern Highway. It is 3.2 kilometres (2 mi) long and named after one of the founding fathers of the town, Paddy Hannan.

It is the location of many historic buildings and establishments. The photographs available of the street in the 20th century reflect the changes in the main thoroughfare of the town.

== Significant buildings located in the street ==
- Exchange Hotel
- Kalgoorlie Hotel
- Kalgoorlie Miner building
- Palace Hotel
- York Hotel
