= Elizabeth Truswell =

Australian paleontologist

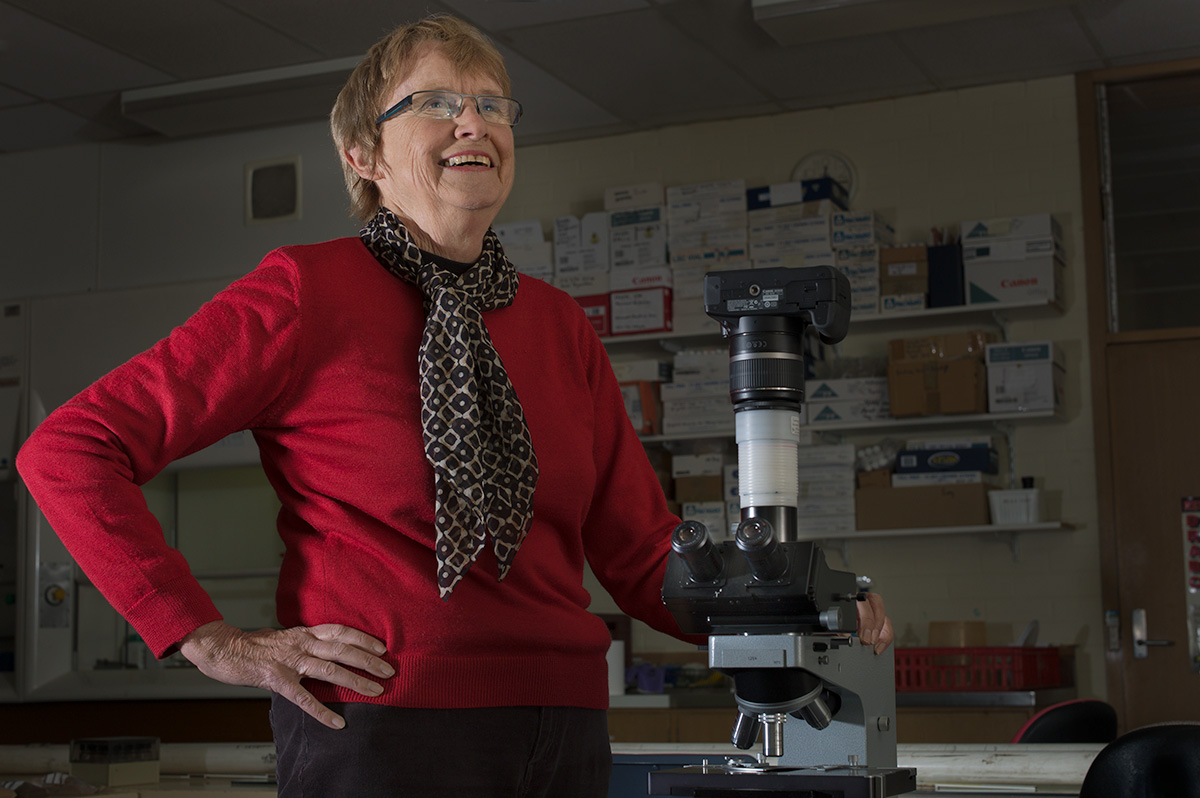
- Born: 15 October 1941
- Education: BSc University of Western Australia; PhD University of Cambridge
- Awards: Fellow of the Australian Academy of Science
- Scientific career
- Fields: Palynology
- Workplaces: Geological Survey Organisation, Geoscience Australia (Bureau of Mineral Resources)
- Website: Elizabeth Truswell at Australia National University

Elizabeth Marchant Truswell FAA (also known as Elizabeth Kemp) is a former Chief Scientist at the Australian Geological Survey Organisation and is known for her application of recycled palynomorph distribution as an indicator of sub-ice geology.

== Early life and education ==
Truswell was born in Kalgoorlie, Western Australia, and attended Kent Street Senior High School. She completed a BSc (Hons) at the University of Western Australia in 1962. In 1963 she received a British Commonwealth Scholarship to undertake a PhD at Cambridge University, UK. She was awarded her PhD in 1966 on the geological history of flowering plants as demonstrated by the pollen record. In 2000, she completed a Visual Arts degree with Honours at the School of Art, Australian National University (ANU), focusing on the role of the artists who accompanied the early explorers to Antarctica.

== Career and impact ==
=== Research ===
Truswell's career has focused on the field of palynology, with a large part devoted to understanding Antarctica's floral history. She developed several novel methods for investigating sub-ice geology via the distribution of recycled pollen spores, leading to her election as a Fellow of the Australian Academy of Science in 1985.

As a postdoctoral researcher at Florida State University, US (1971–1973), Truswell participated in the first Deep Sea Drilling Program (DSDP) voyages to Antarctica, which still holds the record for the furthest south of such drilling. This voyage contributed to a new understanding of the age of the Antarctic ice sheet and the development of an early version of the Antarctic Convergence. She was one of the only women on the voyage, and one of just a handful of women to participate in these early DSDP voyages. She recently published a book about the expedition - "A Memory of Ice". Subsequent work on Ocean Drilling Program material led her, along with M.K. Macphail, to decipher an unparalleled pollen record from Prydz Bay, revealing the composition of terrestrial plant communities during the earliest stages of ice-cap formation during the Late Eocene preglacial-glacial transition.

Truswell returned to Australia in 1973 to begin a career with the Bureau of Mineral Resources (now Geoscience Australia) holding the position of Chief Research Scientist from 1990 to 1997. During this time her work focused not only on the evolutionary and geological history of the Antarctic continent, but also on the past climatic conditions of Australia and applying the geological record to inform understanding of modern climate change. She was also a member of Australia's Antarctic Advisory Committee (1992–1998) and a board member of the first Antarctic Cooperative Research Centre in Hobart, the Antarctic Climate & Ecosystems Cooperative Research Centre.

Truswell has been involved in several UNESCO projects. Her first involvement was with the UNESCO Earth Science program (1991–1999), which aimed to help young Australian scientists take part in projects with people from developing countries. Since 2006 she has served on the Australian National Committee for the International Geoscience Co-operation (IGCP), which is part of the UNESCO International Geosciences Programme.

=== Artwork ===
In 2000 Truswell shifted her emphasis towards the interface between science and the arts, with particular reference to Antarctica. During her time as a visiting fellow in the Research School of Earth Sciences at the Australia National University, she undertook a degree in visual arts at the School of Art. Her artworks are held in a number of collections in Australia and Europe, including, in Canberra, at the ANU and at Geoscience Australia. She has exhibited in solo exhibitions at the ANCA Gallery in Canberra, CSIRO Discovery Centre, the Goldfields Regional Gallery, Kalgoorlie, and the ANU School of Art Gallery. Her public outreach has included talks and radio broadcasts (e.g. ABC Radio National, The Science Show), U3A lectures on Art and Science in Early Antarctic Exploration, and published papers in academic and popular literature.

== Awards and honours ==
- Elected Fellow, Australian Academy of Science, 1985
- Awarded Centenary Medal, 2001
- Elected Fellow, Geological Society of Australia, 2009

== Selected works ==
- Kemp, Elizabeth M (1978) Tertiary climatic evolution and vegetation history in the southeast Indian Ocean region. Palaeogeography, Palaeoclimatology, Palaeoecology 24: 3,169–208.
- Macphail, MK; Alley, NF; Truswell, EM; Sluiter, IRK (1994) 10 Early Tertiary vegetation: evidence from spores and pollen, History of the Australian vegetation: Cretaceous to Recent.189 Cambridge University Press
- Galloway, Robert William; Kemp, EM (1977) Late cainozoic environments in Australia. Bureau of Mineral Resources, Geology and Geophysics
- Frakes, Lawrence A; Kemp, Elizabeth M (1972) Influence of continental positions on early Tertiary climates. Nature 240: 97–100.
