= Bert Nankiville =

Australian swimmer

Personal information
- Born: 7 June 1917 East Coolgardie, Australia
- Died: 6 June 1977 (aged 59) Lancelin, Australia

Sport
- Sport: Swimming

Herbert Nankiville (7 June 1917 – 6 June 1977) was a champion swimmer who won the Australian national 440 yards freestyle championship in 1936. He was inducted into the Goldfields Sporting Hall of Fame in Kalgoorlie, Western Australia, where he also has a road, Nankiville Road, named after him.
