= Palace Hotel, Kalgoorlie =

Palace Hotel
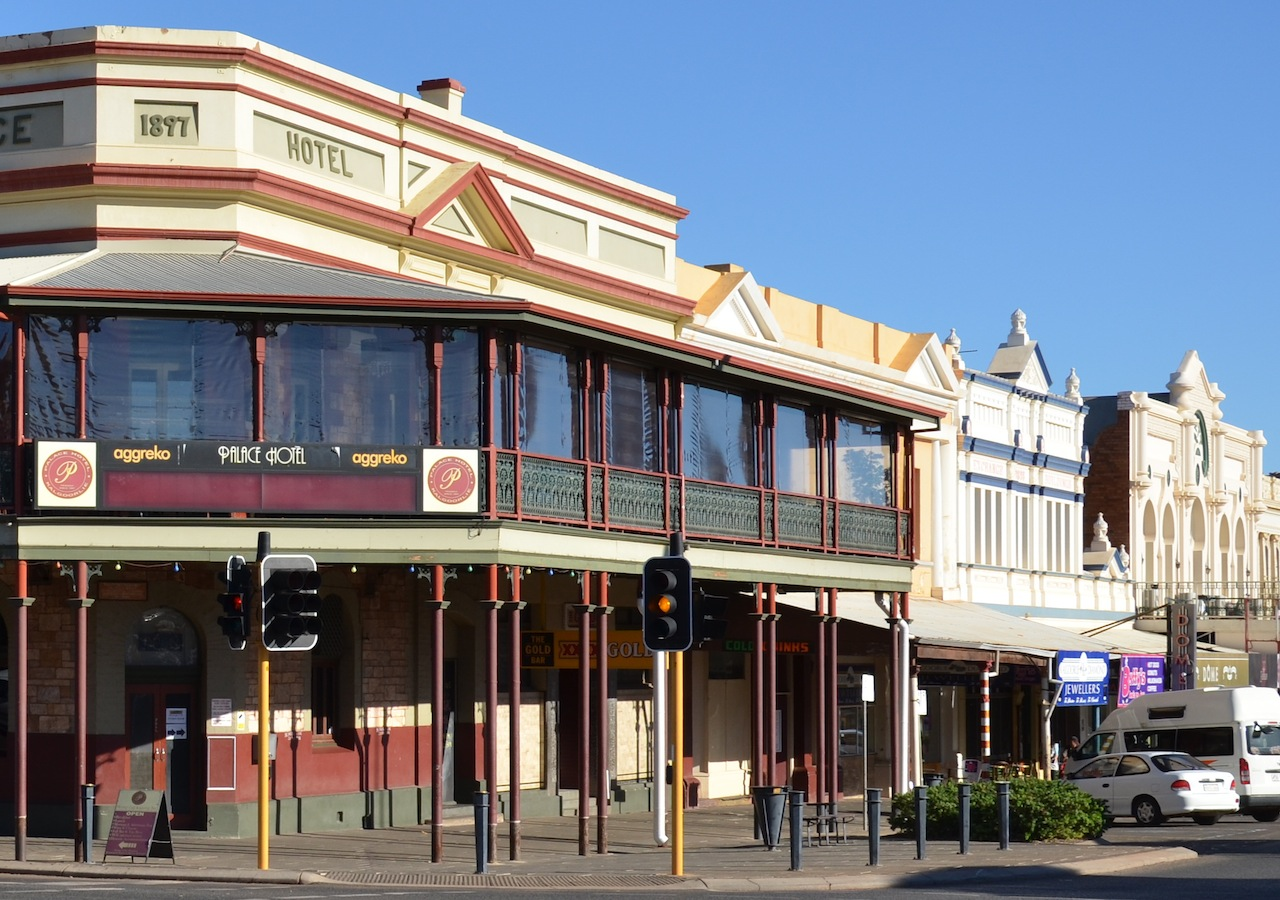
- Interactive map of the Palace Hotel area

General information
- Type: Hotel
- Architectural style: Federation architecture
- Location: Corner of Hannan and Maritana Streets, 137 Hannan Street, Kalgoorlie, Western Australia
- Coordinates: 30.7464°S 121.4743°E
- Opened: December 1897

Technical details
- Floor count: 2

Design and construction
- Architecture firm: Porter & Thomas

Website
- palacehotelkalgoorlie.com

The Palace Hotel is one of a group of heritage hotels on Hannan Street in Kalgoorlie, Western Australia.

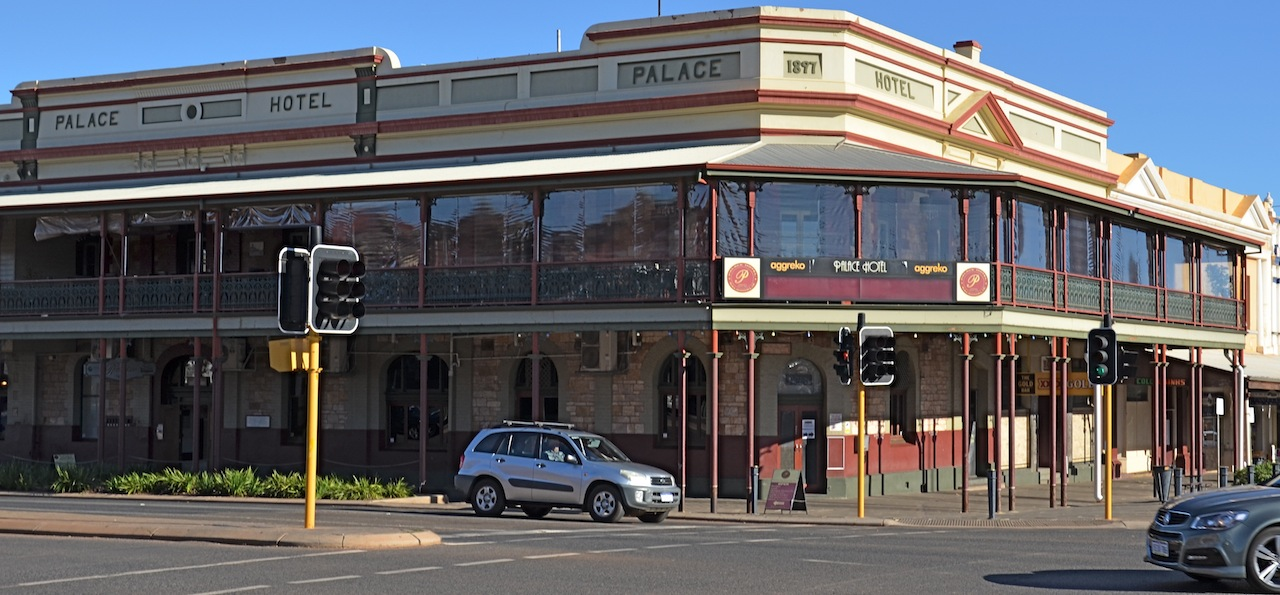

== Location ==
The hotel is located on the corner of Hannan and Maritana Streets.

It is across the road from the Exchange Hotel, another heritage hotel.

== History ==
The hotel was constructed with ashlar stones in 1897 for Harry Rosenthal, who previously managed the Cleopatra Hotel in Fremantle. It cost £17,000 to build, equivalent to A$2.93 million in 2022.

The hotel opened in December 1897, with forty-four bedrooms. It was designed in the Federation architectural style by the firm Porter & Thomas, and meant to be the most luxurious hotel in Western Australia outside Perth. The furniture came from Melbourne. It became the first hotel in Kalgoorlie to have electric lighting, with its own generator, and fresh water in all bathrooms coming directly from its own condensers.

In the year after its completion regular and repeated newspaper articles and photographs were used to praise the hotel and its presentation.

A 1904 fire damaged the hotel and adjacent property.

In 1936 renovations were reported on the Hannan Street side of the building.

=== Herbert Hoover association ===
Herbert Hoover (later the US president from 1929 to 1933) visited the hotel regularly when he was working as a mining engineer in Kalgoorlie. He was twenty-two at the time. During his stay, he reportedly fell in love with a barmaid, and wrote her a poem. An excerpt from the poem can be seen in the foyer. It reads:

Do you ever dream, my sweetheart, of a twilight long ago,
Of a park in old Kalgoorlie, where the bougainvilleas grow?
Where the moonbeams on the pathways trace a shimmering brocade,
And the overhanging peppers form a lover's promenade?
Where in soft cascades of cadence from a garden close at hand,
Came the murmurous, mellow music of a sweet orchestral band.
Years have flown since then, my sweetheart, fleet as orchid blooms in May.
But the hour that fills my dreaming, was it only yesterday...

Before he left for China, Hoover left a mirror as a gift to the hotel. The Hoover Mirror can still be seen in the foyer, next to his poem. Hoover's Cafe and Lounge Bar in the hotel is also named in his honour.

=== Later history ===
The 60th anniversary of the hotel was celebrated with style in 1957.

The hotel has been regularly associated with the Diggers & Dealers conferences.

=== Reference point ===
The hotel and its location on the corner of Hannan Street has been captured in photographs of Hannan Street over time as well as at significant historical events.

== Heritage value ==
The hotel has been listed on the State Heritage Register since 1997.
