= Hay Street, Kalgoorlie =

Street in Kalgoorlie, Western Australia

Hay Street
- Interactive map of Hay Street
- Location: Kalgoorlie, Western Australia

Construction
- Inauguration: 1890s

Hay Street is a street in Kalgoorlie, Western Australia. For most of the history of Kalgoorlie, it was a notorious red light area.

The prevalence of brothels was part of the law and order issue of an isolated mining town, where two-up, prostitution and gold stealing were all regularly reported forms of criminal behaviour.

The street and its associations would regularly be reported in mainstream media.

Towards the end of the twentieth century the prostitution was less infamous, and photographs and stories were more public than in earlier times.

Regulation and prohibition of the prostitution in the street have been publicly discussed a number of times by the local government and citizens of Kalgoorlie.

As of July 2019 one brothel continues to operate.

The street, being close to the town centre, has a number of important administration buildings, and other businesses.
