= Goldfields Air Services =

Australian airline

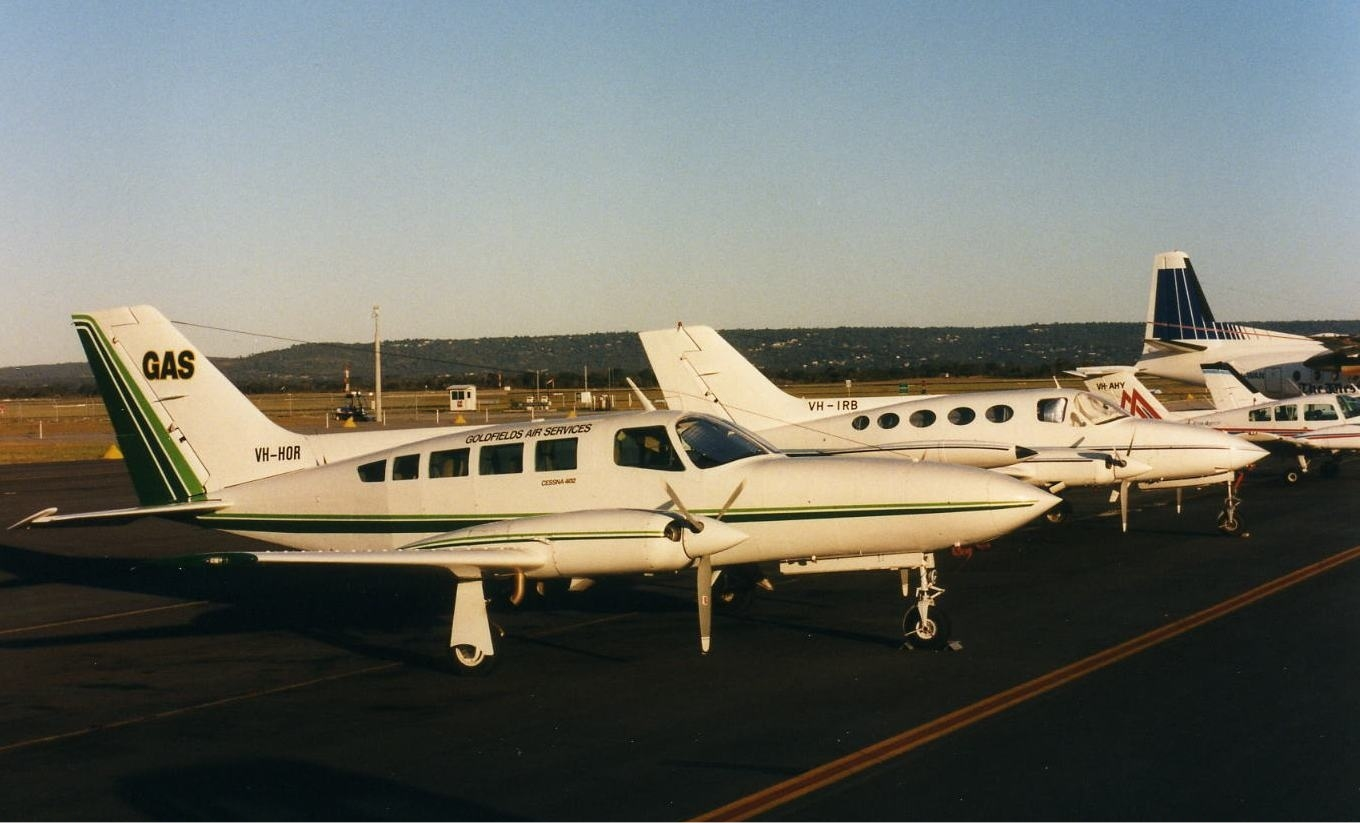
| IATA | ICAO | Call sign |
|---|---|---|
| GX | — | GOLDFIELDS |
- Founded: 1982
- Operating bases: Kalgoorlie
- Hubs: Kalgoorlie
- Fleet size: 8
- Headquarters: Kalgoorlie
- Website: www.goldfieldsairservices.com.au

Goldfields Air Services is an Australian regional airline based out of Kalgoorlie Airport, primarily serving the Goldfields region of Western Australia.

== History ==
Goldfields Air Services (GAS) was founded in 1982.

== Fleet ==
As of March 2025, the Goldfields Air Services fleet consists of 10 aircraft:

- 4 Beechcraft B200
- 1 Beechcraft C90
- 3 Cessna C172
