= Hocking & Co =

Hocking & Co may refer to:

- Hocking and Company, the publishing company
- Hocking & Co, publisher of the Kalgoorlie Miner newspaper
- Hocking & Co, publisher of the Western Argus newspaper
- Sidney Edwin Hocking, founder of Hocking and Company
