= Hal Colebatch =

Australian politician (1872-1953)

The Honourable Sir Hal Colebatch CMG
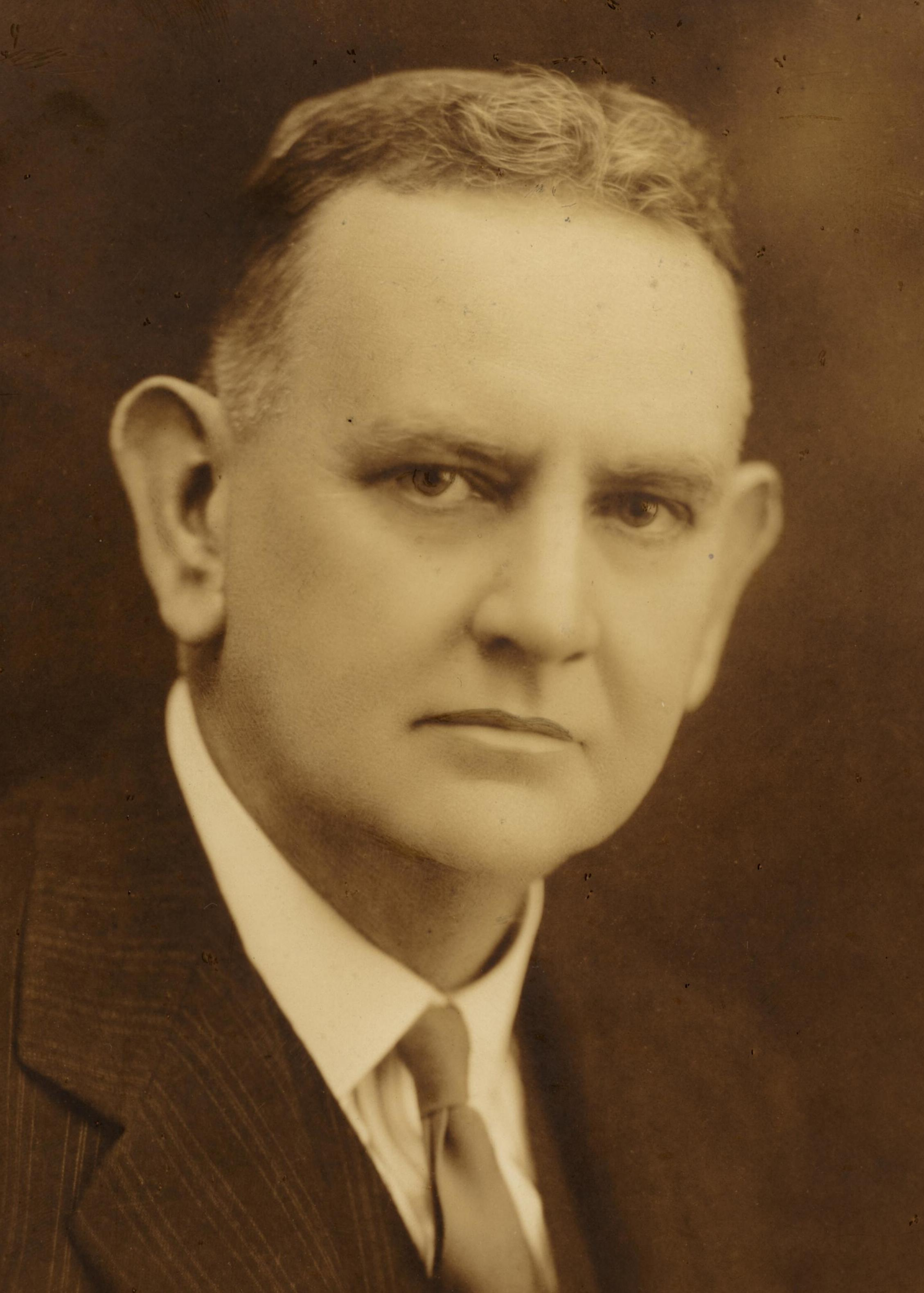

12th Premier of Western Australia
- In office 17 April 1919 – 17 May 1919
- Monarch: George V
- Governor: Sir William Ellison-Macartney
- Preceded by: Sir Henry Lefroy
- Succeeded by: Sir James Mitchell

Minister for Education
- In office 27 July 1916 – 17 June 1923
- Preceded by: Thomas Walker
- Succeeded by: John Ewing

Minister for Public Health
- In office 17 May 1919 – 3 April 1921
- Succeeded by: Frank Broun

Member of the Western Australian Legislative Council
- In office 22 May 1912 – 17 June 1923 Serving with Vernon Hamersley, Thomas Wilding and Charles Baxter
- Preceded by: Warren Marwick
- Succeeded by: William Carroll
- Constituency: East Province

Senator for Western Australia
- In office 1 July 1929 – 20 March 1933 Serving with George Pearce, Patrick Lynch, Walter Kingsmill, William Carroll and Bertie Johnston
- Preceded by: Charles Graham; Ted Needham
- Succeeded by: Herbert Collett

Member of the Western Australian Legislative Council
- In office 22 May 1940 – 21 May 1948 Serving with Leonard Bolton and James Gordon Hislop
- Preceded by: James Franklin
- Succeeded by: Keith Watson; Harry Hearn
- Constituency: Metropolitan Province

Personal details
- Born: Harry Pateshall Colebatch; 29 March 1872 Underley, Wolferlow, Herefordshire, England
- Died: 12 February 1953 (aged 80) Perth, Western Australia, Australia
- Resting place: Karrakatta Cemetery
- Party: Liberal (1912–1917); Nationalist (1917–); United Australia Party; Liberal (1945–1948)
- Spouses: Mary Maude Saunders (m. 1896; died 1940) Marion Frances Gibson (m. 1944)
- Children: Hal G. P. Colebatch
- Occupation: Journalist, politician

Sir Harry Pateshall Colebatch CMG (29 March 1872 – 12 February 1953) was a long-serving figure in Western Australian politics. He was a member of the Western Australian Legislative Council for nearly 20 years, the twelfth Premier of Western Australia for a month in 1919, agent-general in London for five years, and a senator for four years. He was known for supporting free trade, federalism and Western Australian secessionism, and for opposing communism, socialism and fascism. Born in England, his family migrated to South Australia when Colebatch was four years old. He left school aged 11 and worked for several newspapers in South Australia before moving to Broken Hill in New South Wales in 1888 to work as a reporter for the Silver Age. In 1894, he moved to the Western Australian Goldfields following the gold rush there, working for the Golden Age in Coolgardie and the Kalgoorlie Miner in Kalgoorlie. Two years later, he moved to Perth to join the Morning Herald, but after that newspaper collapsed, he moved to Northam where he started The Northam Advertiser. He also became friends with local bank manager James Mitchell and convinced Mitchell to run for state parliament. Colebatch was the mayor of Northam between 1909 and 1912.

Colebatch became a member of parliament himself when he was elected to the East Province of the Legislative Council in 1912. Upon Frank Wilson becoming premier in July 1916, Colebatch was appointed Minister for Education and Colonial Secretary. During a Spanish flu outbreak in South Australia and Victoria in early 1919, Colebatch was Acting Premier as Premier Henry Lefroy was travelling interstate. Colebatch chose to close the Western Australian border, leaving Lefroy and two ministers stuck outside the state. In April 1919, Lefroy resigned as premier and Colebatch took over, making him the only premier to come from the Legislative Council rather than the Legislative Assembly. The major event during his premiership was the 1919 Fremantle Wharf riot, in which two unions were fighting with each other. Colebatch resigned as premier one month after taking the job and was succeeded by Mitchell.

Colebatch served as a minister in the James ministry for four years, but resigned to become agent-general in 1923. He served most of his time as agent-general under a Labor government as Phillip Collier beat Mitchell in an election in March 1924. While agent-general, he toured Italy and met Benito Mussolini, which led him to form his anti-fascist political beliefs. After returning to Australia in 1927, he wrote a book at the request of Collier on the history of Western Australia to commemorate the state's centenary. He also sat on the Royal Commission on the Constitution. In 1928, he was elected to the Australian Senate, where he spent much of his time criticising protectionism, blaming it for worsening the Great Depression. He resigned in 1933 to take the position of agent-general again.

The Western Australian secession referendum occurred soon after Colebatch became agent-general, in which 66.23% of electors voted in favour of seceding. Colebatch was thus appointed to lead a delegation to the British Parliament to request secession. The delegation was unsuccessful, with a parliamentary select committee deciding that allowing Western Australia to secede would go against constitutional conventions. Colebatch continued on as agent-general until 1939, where he would make several trips to Germany to meet with anti-fascists as well as Nazi political figures. After returning to Australia, he was elected to the Legislative Council again, this time for the Metropolitan Province. He would serve there for eight years, and during this time, would frequently write in The Northam Advertiser about his view on World War II. He contested the 1948 election but failed to be elected. Colebatch died in 1953 and was buried in Karrakatta Cemetery.

== Early life and career ==
Colebatch was born on 29 March 1872 in the village of Underley near Wolferlow in Herefordshire, England, to George Pateshall Colebatch, a chemist and farmer, and Georgina Gardiner. The family had six sons and one daughter, with an additional two children who died as infants. They were low church Anglicans. They are descended from John Colebatch, a physician who was knighted by King George I. The Colebatch family once owned a castle at Colebatch, Shropshire, and had extensive lands elsewhere in England and France long before Hal was born, but was by this point quite poor. Due to bad economic conditions in England, the family travelled to South Australia on the St Vincent in 1878. Although it nearly sank along the way, the ship reached Adelaide on 30 November 1878 after 91 days at sea. They settled in the coastal town of Goolwa, South Australia, where they had relatives.

At age eleven, Colebatch left school as his father could not afford to continue with it. The normal leaving age was thirteen, but Colebatch sat and passed an examination in August 1883 to allow him to leave. He got his first job as a junior reporter, printer's devil, compositor and office boy for the Norwood Free Press, a small newspaper in suburban Adelaide. He also attended evening classes in shorthand, literature and Latin at the Pirie Street Literary Institute. This ended when the Norwood Free Press collapsed, leading Colebatch to work for a series of short-lived newspapers in the South Australian goldfields, including the Petersburg Times.

In 1888, aged 16, Colebatch moved to Broken Hill in New South Wales, working as a reporter for the Silver Age for six years. Broken Hill suffered three droughts, four typhoid epidemics, and numerous worker strikes during the time that Colebatch was there. He reported on a number of strike meetings in the latter half of 1892 and was summoned as a Crown witness in the prosecution of strike leaders. Although he was opposed to the strike leaders' actions, he knew them well and did not want them to go to jail. Several of the leaders were convicted, and Colebatch wrote that "I like to think that my notes were instrumental in securing either acquittal or light sentences for the lesser offenders ... I am glad to say Dick Sleath bore me no animosity for the part I had played in securing his conviction." Meanwhile, Colebatch had developed a hobby in chess, becoming the Broken Hill chess champion.

=== Western Australia ===
Gold was discovered at Coolgardie, Western Australia, in 1892 and at the nearby town of Kalgoorlie the following year. This triggered a gold rush in the colony of Western Australia, which had been an economic backwater up until that point. Meanwhile, waning demand for silver combined with a general economic recession in eastern Australia hurt the prosperity of Broken Hill. The Silver Age, by then known as the Broken Hill Age, was on the verge of collapse and the payment of Colebatch's wages had become irregular. Colebatch was ready to leave Broken Hill when in 1894, he received a letter from his friend Sidney Hocking saying that he had just purchased the Western Argus, Kalgoorlie's weekly newspaper, and wanted Colebatch to take his place at the Golden Age in Coolgardie. Colebatch left for Western Australia later that year. Upon arriving in Fremantle, he had made just enough money gambling to catch the train to Southern Cross, but he had to walk the remaining 180 kilometres (110 mi) across the desert to Coolgardie instead of taking a coach, arriving there in early 1895.

Coolgardie soon died down as all the surface gold was taken, and Kalgoorlie overtook it to become the Goldfields' largest town. The Golden Age burnt down in September 1895, and so Colebatch moved to Kalgoorlie to work with Hocking on the Kalgoorlie Miner, a new daily newspaper. In Kalgoorlie, he met his future wife, Mary Maud Saunders, born c. 1869 in South Australia. At the start of 1896, they moved to Perth, the colony's capital city, for Colebatch to join the Morning Herald as its mining and chess editor. He also became the Western Australian correspondent for the British Australasian and the Financial Times and the metropolitan correspondent for several regional newspapers. Among the things he reported on was Premier John Forrest's announcement of the Goldfields Water Supply Scheme. Colebatch married Saunders on 29 April 1896 in St George's Cathedral, Perth.

In 1898, Colebatch was banned from the parliamentary press gallery for reporting on a supposed fistfight that had occurred between two members of parliament. A police inspector who had been in Parliament House at the time had told the story to a journalist for the Morning Herald, who then passed the story on to Colebatch who then telegraphed it to the Kalgoorlie Miner. Later that day, Colebatch discovered that the story had been exaggerated and that it was merely a verbal disagreement. The telegraph office was closed by that time, and so the Kalgoorlie Miner on 23 September 1898 had printed the details of the supposed fist fight on its front page. Forrest was furious, and he attempted to have the publishers prosecuted for published libel. After that failed, Forrest discovered that Colebatch was the reporter who passed the story along, and he had Colebatch banned from the parliamentary press gallery. Colebatch was dragged out by the sergeant-at-arms on 19 October 1898, and the following day, Colebatch sent a letter that he intended to sue the sergeant-at-arms for assault. After heavy media criticism, the ban was lifted and the police inspector was demoted and transferred.

Colebatch became the state chess champion in 1898. By the late 1890s, the federation of Australia had become a major political issue. The Morning Herald, which by this time Colebatch had become assistant leader-writer under Archibald Sanderson, campaigned against federation. Colebatch was inspired by Sanderson's anti-federation arguments and became anti-federation himself, unusual for someone from eastern Australia. (Note: The majority of people from eastern Australia, also known as t'othersiders, that came during the gold rushes in the 1890s supported federation and the majority of people who had lived in Western Australia before that opposed federation.) Writing for the Royal Western Australian Historical Society's Early Days journal in 1951, Colebatch said that "Sanderson's anti-federal articles — from the Western Australian point of view — could be examined line for line [today] and proved to be an absolutely accurate forecast of what has happened to the State under federation." Sanderson was not ideologically opposed to federation but was against the terms with which Western Australia was going to enter, saying that "no words in a written constitution could protect a small state in a federation against larger and more powerful ones making policies against its interest." Western Australia ended up voting for federation in a 1900 referendum, and so it became one of the six states of Australia on 1 January 1901.

=== Northam ===
The Morning Herald eventually collapsed, and so in 1904, Colebatch moved to Northam, a town in Western Australia's Wheatbelt. Largely using borrowed money, he bought his own newspaper: The Northam Advertiser. A friend from Broken Hill, J. T. Nichols, was put in charge of printing the newspaper, leaving Colebatch in charge of the journalism, allowing the newspaper to prosper. By this point, he had two sons: Harley and Gordon Lindsay, and was looking for a more settled life. He lived in Northam for years to come.

In Northam, Colebatch became friends with local bank branch manager and future premier James Mitchell. Impressed by Mitchell, Colebatch encouraged Mitchell to stand for state parliament and he became Mitchell's campaign manager. Mitchell won the Legislative Assembly seat of Northam in the 1905 state election, defeating the incumbent Labor candidate, and held it until 1933. Although Colebatch was the better public speaker of the two, he often put Mitchell's political career ahead of his own. Although he likely would have probably easily won it, Colebatch did not contest the seat as he would have to oust his friend. Mitchell rose rapidly in the ranks of government, becoming a minister in 1906 and obtaining the important portfolios of lands and agriculture in 1909. During this time, Colebatch was seen as Mitchell's éminence grise.

Colebatch founded the Northam Bowling Club and also took a part in creating a bowling club in the nearby town of York. In 1905, he won the state championship in bowls pairs and became the vice-president of the Western Australian Bowling Association. He became a well-known figure within Northam, becoming a justice of the peace in 1906, a member of the District Board of Education, the local fire brigades board and the state fire brigades board. In November 1909, he was elected unopposed as the mayor of Northam after being nominated by the retiring mayor, Oscar Bernard. Colebatch oversaw the sealing of Northam's roads for the first time as well as the development of the Avon River with weirs and embankments to enhance the surroundings and prevent flooding, an initiative started by Bernard. Colebatch managed to secure several large grants from the state government for these works.

== State politics ==
He first ran for parliament in 1910, contesting the East Province of the Legislative Council in a by-election on 26 September resulting from the death of George Throssell. Colebatch came second out of the three candidates, being beat by the more well known Warren Marwick. He then received a petition from 72 electors to run again, so he contested the newly-created seat of Avon in the 1911 state election. He was narrowly defeated by Thomas Bath from the Labor Party. In early 1912, Colebatch and Mitchell formed a Liberal League in Northam. Colebatch was also the convenor of a finance sub-committee within the Liberal Party, which made the successful recommendation to charge a membership fee so the party would be less reliant on large donors. In March 1912, Colebatch was elected to the executive committee of the Liberal Party.

Colebatch was initially not going to contest the May 1912 Legislative Council election, but Marwick had become unpopular in Northam due to his opinion on the proposed route for the transcontinental railway line. The most likely route was to be via Midland and Northam, where there was already a line, but there was an alternative proposal via Armadale and Brookton, which is also in the East Province. Marwick chose to support the Armadale-Brookton route, which resulted in his unpopularity within Northam. A public meeting in Northam decided that a better candidate must contest the East Province, and so Colebatch became a last-minute candidate. He supported the transcontinental railway line passing through Northam and a developmental railway being built from Armadale to Brookton. Colebatch won the East Province, beating Marwick by a small margin in every polling place except for in Marwick's home town of York. Colebatch took his seat on 27 June 1912. He did not contest the November 1912 Northam municipal election and was succeeded as mayor by Bernard.

=== In opposition ===
Colebatch was part of the newly-formed Liberal Party, however in his maiden speech, he said he would always speak for his individual feelings. At the time, John Scaddan had been premier for a year and the Labor Party had a substantial majority in the Legislative Assembly, however the Legislative Council had a conservative majority. According to historian Brian De Garis, "for a man like Colebatch, there could not have been a more opportune moment for launching a parliamentary career". He says it would have been difficult for Colebatch to stand out if he had entered the conservative-dominated upper house during a Liberal government, but entering during a Labor government gave him an opportunity to use his formidable debating skills. Colebatch would soon become the Scaddan government's harshest critic in the Legislative Council and Labor members grew to dread his speeches.

The Scaddan government felt that establishing and expanding government enterprises was in the best interests of the state, something that Colebatch was strongly opposed to. The government set out to establish state-run and state-subsidised brickworks, sawmills, quarries, hotels, dairies, ferries, butcher shops, fish shops, brick works, tramways, meat works, quarries and abattoirs.

Colebatch lead the opposition to the Tramways Purchase Bill 1912, which sought to nationalise trams in Perth. He felt that the Perth City Council was being cheated out of their reversionary rights to the tramways and that the government would be a poor operator like they were with the railways. The bill was passed anyway, but it earned Colebatch a reputation as a "hard fighter and a brilliant speaker". Two of the most important bills passed in this session of parliament were the Workers' Compensation Act and the Industrial Arbitration Act. Workers' Compensation previously only applied to certain occupations, but the new act extended it to apply to all workers earning less than £300 per annum. Although he did not vote against it, Colebatch criticised the bill for hurting employers and was successful in limiting parts of the bill. The Industrial Arbitration Act consolidated previous legislation and made it easier for unions to approach the Court of Arbitration. Colebatch opposed the bill for preferencing unionists and hampering the ability of industries to compete with overseas firms. Eventually the two sides met and worked out a compromise which the government and the opposition could both support. One bill that Colebatch was especially interested in was the Water Rights and Irrigation Bill. The bill was referred to a select committee that he was the chairman of and he introduced many of the amendments that the committee recommended. The amendments were not accepted by the Legislative Assembly though and the bill did not pass. The following year, the bill was introduced again, but it failed to pass again. It eventually passed in 1914.

By 1913, Colebatch had gained a prominent position in the Liberal Party's governance. In February 1913, he was elected as a vice-president of the party's executive committee. His opponents used this to attack his claimed position of being above party politics.

One of the bills the government introduced in 1913 was the Electoral Districts Bill, which proposed having commissioners design the electoral districts rather than parliament and introduced equally-populated constituencies for all of Western Australia except for three seats in the north of the state. This would have increased the number of metropolitan districts at the expense of rural districts. Colebatch opposed having equally-populated constituencies, saying that "it seems to be utterly unfair that huge districts with great interests and scattered population should be put in the same position as closely congested and settled communities". He proposed seven amendments, including that rural districts should have 20 percent fewer voters and metropolitan districts should have more voters. The Legislative Council accepted these amendments but the Legislative Assembly did not, meaning the bill was unable to pass.

Matthew Moss, the unofficial leader of the opposition in the Legislative Council, retired at the 1914 election, enabling Colebatch to take the position. During 1914, Colebatch lead the opposition to the Income Tax (War Emergency) Bill, which was to raise taxes mainly to support farmers during the drought which was occurring at the time. Colebatch attacked the government for introducing the bill so late in the session, just before the 1914 election, without the presentation of estimates, and for only one third of the money raised going to the farmers. The bill was defeated by the Legislative Council by eighteen votes to six. The following year, Colebatch opposed the Income and Public Entertainments Taxation Bill, which was expected to increase taxation so that money could be spent on public works to create jobs. He believed that the money would better off with private enterprise, which would be able to provide more jobs and greater benefits to the state.

=== In government ===
In July 1916, the Liberal and Country parties cooperated to pass a vote of no confidence in the Scaddan Government. Labor had been left with a minority of seats in the Legislative Assembly following several resignations and the Country Party had drifted closer to the Liberal Party compared to when they were initially elected to parliament in 1914. The Liberal Party's Frank Wilson became premier, and although he had only been in parliament for four years, Colebatch was an obvious choice to join the ministry and lead the government in the Legislative Council. By this time, Colebatch was looked at by some as the state's next John Forrest, (Note: John Forrest had been the state's premier for 11 years, far longer than any of his successors. His departure from state politics for federal politics in 1901 led to a dearth in the state parliament's talent.) and so he was appointed Minister for Education and Colonial Secretary. Mitchell was also a member of the ministry, being appointed Minister for Railways and Minister for Water Supply.

The colonial secretary was responsible for numerous miscellaneous departments, including charities, public health, aborigines, public gardens, the state shipping service. Although the colonial secretary had to introduce many bills and answer many questions in parliament, it was not a role that allowed for high achievement to shine. On the other hand, the role of education minister allowed for this, and Colebatch found this to be his favourite portfolio. He later claimed that he was appointed education minister due to his advocacy for country high schools when Wilson was previously premier.

Parliament was adjourned for seven weeks for ministerial by-elections to take place. Colebatch was subsequently elected unopposed. Soon after parliament resumed, it was adjourned again for the 1916 Australian conscription referendum campaign. Like most Liberal politicians, Colebatch supported conscription, and his rhetoric grew more and more nationalistic as the campaign went on. Western Australia ended up voting for conscription, whereas nationally, the majority voted against conscription. Meanwhile, both of Colebatch's sons enlisted in the army and in 1917, they went to fight in France in World War I. Gordon was severely injured by a shell blast and suffered the effects of this for the rest of his life. To help raise funds for soldiers and dependents in need, Colebatch was the chairman of the Western Australian War Patriotic Fund.

The parliamentary session under the Wilson government only got underway in November 1916. The government passed the Trading Concerns Act, which put all trading concerns on a commercial basis as well as preventing the establishment of trading concerns without the approval of parliament, preventing the government from using its executive power to do so like the Scaddan government often did. The State Fish Supplies, which was one of Colebatch's responsibilities, was shut down due to not being commercially viable. On the other hand, the State Steamship Service proved viable and was not shut down.

Colebatch was opposed to large-scale gambling and lotteries, particularly those run by the government, believing them to be a tax on the poor and stupid. He introduced a bill to outlaw bookmaking in 1916, but it was not passed by parliament. A success that Colebatch had as colonial secretary was to convert Rottnest Island from a prison to a holiday resort. The island was made an A-class reserve in 1917 and Colebatch was appointed as the first president of the Rottnest Island Board of Control. Some prisoners were retained for the first few years as cheap labour, but by 1922, the last prisoners were removed from the island.

In May 1917, the Liberal Party was disbanded and turned into the Nationalist Party, and in June, the new party elected Henry Lefroy as its leader. Wilson resigned as premier, and so Lefroy was appointed to the position. Colebatch became the unofficial deputy premier (Note: The position of Deputy Premier of Western Australia did not become official until 1955.) and kept his previous positions in the new ministry. Despite this, Colebatch stated his distaste in the way that Wilson had been ousted and was disappointed that Mitchell was no longer in the ministry.

The 1917 state election occurred soon after the Lefroy Ministry was appointed, and after that, parliament only resumed for a week before it was adjourned for the 1917 Australian conscription referendum campaign.

By 1917, Colebatch had established district high schools in Northam and Geraldton. He had also established scholarships to enable children from outside areas to attend them. Two more district high schools were created in Bunbury and Albany that year. Establishing the first high schools outside Perth and the Goldfields had been the issue which had impelled him to enter politics. In 1918, Nationalist member John Stewart resigned from the seat of Claremont in the Legislative Assembly. It was offered to Colebatch that he resign from the Legislative Council to contest the resulting by-election so that he could one day become premier, however Colebatch decline the offer as he did not want to undermine confidence in the Lefroy Government.

=== Spanish flu ===
By late 1918, the Spanish flu had become a pandemic, and returning soldiers aboard the HMAT Boonah were falling sick. As the Colonial Secretary, Colebatch was responsible for public health. With the ship approaching Fremantle, Colebatch set up an emergency isolation camp on Garden Island to supplement the existing quarantine facility at Woodman Point. He also considered using Rottnest Island if need be, but it was not ideal as it was further from the mainland than Garden Island. The mayor of Fremantle, William Montgomery, demanded that Lefroy disallow the Boonah from entering the port. However Colebatch stated that he believed that the sick soldiers were "entitled to be taken off the boat as soon as land is reached", and that allowing the ship to continue on to the eastern states would result in most of the other passengers on board being infected. As a result, several hundred of the 1,200 people aboard the ship were quarantined at Woodman Point. Colebatch denounced the federal government's handling of the matter, as despite it being responsible for shipping and quarantine under the Australian constitution, it did very little.

The state and federal governments agreed that any state with a Spanish flu outbreak should be declared an infected area, which would stop all land communication and sea communication would be quarantined. Following Parliament's recess for Christmas 1918, Lefroy and two cabinet ministers attended conferences in Melbourne, leaving Colebatch as acting premier. During that time, the Spanish flu broke out in South Australia and Victoria, however these states refused to follow the agreement and did not declare an infected area. Despite this, Colebatch decided to close the Western Australian border. Coincidentally, a shipping strike meant that there was no coastal shipping in the state, but transcontinental trains were still running when he decided to close the border. Passengers on a train from Adelaide were put in an improvised quarantine camp in Parkeston just east of Kalgoorlie where the railway gauge changed. William Watt, the acting prime minister, threatened Western Australia with dire consequences for impounding the train. Watt told Lefroy that:

The Commonwealth Government will hold your government responsible for all damage done to trains, expenditure incurred, and loss sustained in connection with seizures. Unless I receive from you before 5 p.m. on Wednesday the 5th inst. a definite assurance that no further trains will be seized, and that those detailed will be restored, I will order the complete suspension of the railway service between Kalgoorlie and Port Augusta without further delay. I regret having to resort to drastic procedure, but owing to the failure of your Government to extend the courtesy of prior notification to this Government and before action was taken by your Government, and the continued resistance of the authorities in your State to the operation of the Quarantine Agreement, no other course remains open.

Lefroy decided that he would not stand in the way of Colebatch and further action was up to him. South Australia eventually declared infection meaning the railway would have been shut down under the agreement. Because of the shipping strike, Lefroy and the two ministers could not get back to Western Australia without taking the train. Colebatch decided to allow a special train in, as long as the people aboard quarantined, but Watt disallowed this from happening. In general, Western Australians strongly supported Colebatch's actions during the Spanish flu pandemic. He earned further praise when he ended a two-month-long tramway strike.

=== Premier ===
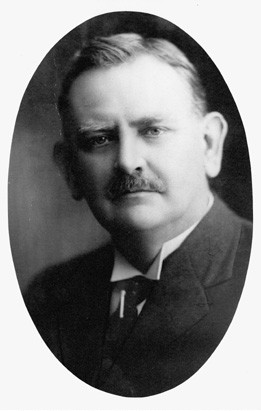
Colebatch c. 1919

In April 1919, Lefroy resigned as premier, and Colebatch took over, becoming the only premier to come from the Legislative Council. Colebatch made himself Colonial Treasurer, the minister for education and the minister for railways. He reinstated Mitchell in the cabinet, making him the minister for lands.

The largest issue during his premiership was the 1919 Fremantle Wharf riot. Stevedores from two different unions — the National Waterside Workers Union (NWWU) and the Fremantle Lumpers Union (FLU) — were working at Fremantle Harbour. The two unions often disagreed with each other and the Commonwealth Arbitration Board favoured the NWWU. Western Australia had a shortage of many essential goods such as medical supplies and food as a result of the earlier shipping strike and the need to quarantine. When the SS Dimboola arrived in Perth from Melbourne, carrying passengers (including Lefroy) and cargo, the passengers and most of the crew went into quarantine, but the federal government allowed some of the crew to berth the ship before going into quarantine. Fremantle Harbour officials did not allow the ship to berth and forced it to be fumigated at anchor. The NWWU workers then began to unload the ship but the FLU workers attacked them and started picketing, wanting to remove all NWWU workers from working at the wharf. Colebatch implored Watt to try and settle the dispute, as industrial relations were the responsibility of the federal government and the state had little power to do anything other than to use police to diffuse violence. Watt disagreed and said it was up to the state to solve the issue. He also said that if the issue was not fixed quickly, then he would stop shipping to Fremantle. His son, Hal G. P. Colebatch, posited in his 2004 biography that Watt was "probably trying to get revenge on Colebatch for impounding the Commonwealth train and his earlier criticism of the Commonwealth Government during the Boonah affair."

On 1 May, Colebatch told the FLU that he would get the police if they did not come to an agreement or cease picketing the wharf. The union did not do this, and so on 4 May, a group of people travelled down the Swan River in two launches. Among the people on the boats were Colebatch, the commissioner of police, small businessmen and consignees desperate to get the Dimboola unloaded. As the boats travelled under a bridge, the FLU members dropped rocks, scrap iron and other objects onto the boats in an attempt to sink them. The larger objects missed the boats, but several people were injured by smaller objects. University of New South Wales Professor of History Francis Keble Crowley said that "the premier came close to being assassinated when masonry hit the deck of his launch." When the boats reached the wharf, a riot broke out between the union workers and the police, who were trying to push the crowd back from the ship. During this, a man named Thomas Edwards was injured and later died. The police commissioner told Colebatch that the police could not control the situation without shooting their guns, but Colebatch did not want to authorise that. Colebatch, the police commissioner, the businessmen and consignees soon left, unsuccessful. In total, approximately 26 police officers and six FLU workers were injured, excluding Edwards. The following day, there was further violence between police and union members. Colebatch announced on 8 May 1919 that the NWWU had agreed to withdraw from the wharf to avoid any further conflict.

Colebatch resigned as premier on 15 May 1919 as he was unable to find a Legislative Assembly seat and his health was deteriorating due to undiagnosed diabetes. On 17 May, James Mitchell was sworn in as premier and Colebatch was appointed the minister for agriculture, minister for education, minister for the north-west and the new position of minister for health, a role which he had performed before that as the colonial secretary. He was also the deputy premier and leader of the government in the Legislative Council again.

=== Mitchell Government ===
Mitchell did not like travelling interstate for meetings with the prime minister and other premiers, so he often had Colebatch represent him instead. Colebatch attended a meeting with Prime Minister Billy Hughes and the other premiers in October 1919. Hughes wanted to enlarge the powers of the Commonwealth Government, which Colebatch was opposed to, as he believed local self-governance improved economic efficiency and individual freedom. Starting in May 1920, he visited the north-west of the state, a place usually neglected by the state government. When he visited Onslow, it was the first time in ten years a government minister had visited there. The visit to the north-west lasted three months and he travelled 8,000 kilometres (5,000 mi).

He met with Hughes again to show the prime minister the Group Settlement Scheme and the Fairbridge Farm School. Colebatch managed to help convince Hughes of the need for an increase in immigration to increase the state's population and develop its infrastructure, an interest of Mitchell's. Hughes wrote a letter to Colebatch in March 1922 committing to increasing immigration, and later an agreement was signed between the Australian, Western Australian and British governments for seventy-five thousand British migrants to settle in the state. Reducing unemployment was one of Colebatch's other responsibilities, and he instituted various public works to help with that. Although some saw trying to increase immigration as working against efforts to decrease unemployment, Colebatch believed it would be short-sighted to not do so.

In addition to showing Hughes around Western Australia, Colebatch did the same for several other figures. In 1922, he guided Colonel S. F. Newcombe, who was sent by the British Government to investigate settling discharged soldiers there. He also guided V. S. Srinivasa Sastri, who was sent to ensure that Indians settled in white British countries were not discriminated against. Another task for Colebatch was to negotiate with John Forrest's widow, Margaret Forrest, over a statue of Forrest which the government wanted to erect in Kings Park. Lady Forrest wanted for the statue to depict him as a "slim young explorer", but Colebatch convinced her that a statue depicting him as a "mature and portly statesman" would be best.

From 1921 to 1922, Colebatch was the president of the West Australian Club. He was also a life member of the Royal Perth Yacht Club. Following the 1921 state election, Colebatch was the only minister in the Legislative Council. He was therefore responsible for introducing and handling all bills and other business of the upper house, placing a large workload on him. As there was much hinging on him, the house adjourned when he became sick. Several of his colleagues thought the burden on him was too much.

In the 1923 New Year Honours, Colebatch was made a Companion of the Order of St Michael and St George. Later that year, his title of "Honourable" was made permanent. In early 1923, Mitchell announced that he had chosen Colebatch to be the next Agent-General for Western Australia in London. He resigned from the ministry and from parliament on 17 June 1923, and was succeeded by William Carroll. Over the seven years he had been a minister, the state's expenditure on education had risen by 73%. To show their admiration, senior Education Department officials arranged a special function for Colebatch's departure. He had given equal shares in The Northam Advertiser to his wife and two sons as a reward for their service in the army. Harley became editor though Hal continued to write for it.

== Agent-general ==
On his way to England, Colebatch passed through Queensland. Mitchell had asked Colebatch to find him an advisor on tropical agriculture. After talking to Queensland Premier Ted Theodore, Colebatch found Frank Wise in Townsville and recommended him to the Western Australian Government. Wise accepted the offer, and moved to Western Australia. He would later be elected to the Western Australian Parliament as a Labor member and become premier in 1945. In Calcutta, he developed a carbuncle which he had an operation for. His doctor told him he was days away from death before the operation. Two days after it, he was diagnosed with diabetes. He had to stay in Calcutta for several weeks while he recovered.

Soon after he arrived in London, the 1924 Western Australian state election occurred, in which Labor, led by Philip Collier, defeated the Coalition, led by James Mitchell. Colebatch spend the rest of his term as agent-general under a Labor Western Australian Government. Among the things the role entailed was representing the State Government in negotiations with the British Government, the Australian Government and sometimes other foreign governments, deal with European investors and companies operating in Western Australia, arrange loans, work as a purchasing agent for government departments, recruit for specialist positions, communicate with the premier about the goings on in London, promote migration to Western Australia, represent the state at ceremonies, assist Western Australians in London, and generally do things to raise the profile of the state.

He became chairman of the committee responsible for the Australian section of the British Empire Exhibition in 1924 after the previous committee fell apart. Despite this, Colebatch had reservations about the exhibition, thinking it should have involved more than just the British Empire. He supported Australian High Commissioner Joseph Cook when he opposed the country subsidizing the following year's event. Colebatch became a member of the Savage Club when one of the committee members nominated him. He found difficulty in raising loans for Western Australia, firstly, because the London money market was depressed, and secondly, because much loan money was being sent to Germany instead due to the high interest rates there. When the Group Settlement Scheme seemed to be failing, Colebatch persuaded Collier to travel to London to negotiate a new migration deal. Collier dislike travelling, but he went to London anyway and a new deal was signed.

Colebatch's term as agent-general was planned to end in November 1926, just a few months before the 1927 state election. He pointed out to Collier that he would have been expected by Coalition politicians to campaign against Labor in the election. He thought it would be distasteful to campaign against the government when they had worked together well over the previous three years. Collier agreed, and so Colebatch's term as agent-general was extended by a year. In the 1927 New Year Honours, he was made a Knight Bachelor upon the recommendation of the Labor government.

While Colebatch was living in London, his son Gordon was living in Italy to study singing, theatre and languages. In 1927, Colebatch and his wife travelled around Italy for several months, visiting Rome and Venice among other places. Gordon was friends with high ranking officials in the British Embassy in Rome, through which he secured a private meeting between Colebatch and Benito Mussolini at Chigi Palace. His tour around Italy led Colebatch to form his anti-fascist political beliefs.

== Return to Australia ==
Upon returning to Australia in 1927, Collier asked Colebatch to create a book on the history of Western Australia to commemorate the state's centenary in 1929. Although Colebatch was the book's editor, he wrote almost all of it himself, and was not paid. The book, titled A Story of A Hundred Years: Western Australia 1829–1929, was published in 1929.

While working on the book, Prime Minister Stanley Bruce asked for Colebatch to sit on the Royal Constitution on the Constitution to suggest possible amendments. Colebatch accepted, and became one of seven members of the commission. The other six were from New South Wales and Victoria, and none of them were federalists like Colebatch. The Victorian members even wanted to abolish the states, but that position lost out. The commission travelled around Australia, holding 198 public sittings and examining 339 witnesses. Colebatch suggest that the election method for the Australian Senate be changed from the "block majority" method to proportional representation. This recommendation was adopted twenty years later. When the commission handed down its report, Colebatch also released a minority report.

=== Australian Senate ===
Colebatch was elected as a senator for Western Australia at the 1928 federal election, taking his seat on 1 July 1929. He had accepted the nomination from the Nationalist Party on the condition that he would not attend party meetings and that he would not be bound by how the party wanted to vote, believing that the party system undermined the Senate's intended role as the state's house. These conditions were unusual, and likely prevented him from becoming a minister. Elected alongside Colebatch as a senator for Western Australia were Bertie Johnston, a former Labor politician turned Country Party member, and incumbent Nationalist senator Walter Kingsmill. Colebatch was the first of the three elected, declaring that his election was an endorsement of his belief that the Senate should be a states' house and not a party house.

During the Great Depression, Colebatch spoke against protectionism and criticised the complacency of the Labor government and previous Coalition government which had allowed Australians to live beyond their means by excessive borrowing. When the government raised tariffs in 1929 and 1930, he was one of just a few members of parliament to oppose this. He argued that protectionism was bad for Western Australia, South Australia and Tasmania, as those states were export-oriented and had little manufacturing industry. Western Australia's gold industry was hit hard by tariffs, which had steadily climbed since federation. The federal government was also price fixing so that it could buy gold at below market value. The industry was agitating for subsidies but Colebatch was ideologically opposed to this, so he instead introduced an amendment to a bill so that the government would have to pay market price for gold. This amendment was supported by the state's other senators, but other than that, only a few senators supported the amendment. Colebatch ended up reluctantly supporting subsidies for gold. He opposed subsidies for other materials though, and succeeded in defeating two of them. In December 1930, he opposed a bill to convert the railway from Fremantle to Kalgoorlie to standard gauge which would have made a standard gauge rail link from Sydney to Perth. He was Western Australia's only politician to oppose this, and he did so because he did not want to fund public works with loans without any provision for paying back the loans. He was also one of few people at the time to question why railways were under public ownership.

Colebatch criticised the Labor government when it reduced military training in country areas as it cost more than in cities, saying that it was unfair to people living in the country and that the Great Depression could lead to war. He lobbied for the Australian government to contribute to the construction of the Singapore Naval Base.

In 1930, Colebatch was the vice-chairman of a select committee to investigate the standing committee system, although he acted as the chairman for much of that time as the chairman was overseas. Its recommendations were for the establishment of a Standing Committee on External Affairs and a Standing Committee on Regulations and Ordinances, as well as the amendment of the Senate's standing orders so that bills could be referred to select committees. The Committee of Regulations and Ordinances was established as a result, and became a permanent part of the Senate machinery. Otto Niemeyer, a British banker who had worked for HM Treasury and the Bank of England, visited Australia in 1930 to give the prime minister and premiers advice on the Great Depression. James Mitchell, who by that time had become the premier of Western Australia again, sent Colebatch instead. Colebatch largely agreed with what Niemeyer said, however the Labor Party did not.

Sitting next to Colebatch in the Senate was James Patrick Digger Dunn, a Labor Party senator. Although they had radically different political beliefs and frequently debated within the Senate, they formed a personal friendship. During the Australian Labor Party split of 1931, Dunn joined the breakaway Lang Labor faction. Near the end of 1931, Lang Labor members were planning a vote of no confidence for the removal of the Scullin government, but they needed all Coalition members present in the House of Representatives for when the vote was planned to take place. Dunn asked for Colebatch to make sure that all Coalition members were present, who then went to the leader of the Senate opposition, George Pearce, who was uninterested. Colebatch then went to William Glasgow and managed to convince him that Dunn was telling the truth. As a result, all Coalition members were present for the vote of no confidence, and they, combined with Lang Labor, were able to force an early election in which the Scullin government was defeated.

Colebatch was disappointed when the new United Australia Party government turned out to be almost as protectionist as the previous government. In May 1932, he tried to amend the Customs Bill so that the government was obliged to have its tariff schedules approved by parliament within three months. After some debate, he compromised on six months and so the amendment was passed. Colebatch was the only senator to oppose the Ottawa Agreement of 1932, which established the system of Imperial Preference.

== Agent-general again ==
=== Secessionism ===
In January 1933, Mitchell offered Colebatch the position of agent-general again. Colebatch, believing his anti-protectionist efforts in the Senate to be futile, took the position, making him the first person to be agent-general for Western Australia twice. By this time, he was involved with the campaign for Western Australian secession and had joined the Dominion League, an organisation advocating for secession. He soon became one of the league's most prominent speakers, most notably delivering a speech on 13 February 1933 at the Perth Town Hall to an overflowing audience. The anti-secessionist Federal League objected to Colebatch being associated with the pro-secession campaign as the agent-general is meant to be neutral, but he was still a senator and had not taken up the position of agent-general yet. He resigned from the Senate on 20 March 1933 and assumed the position of agent-general five days later.

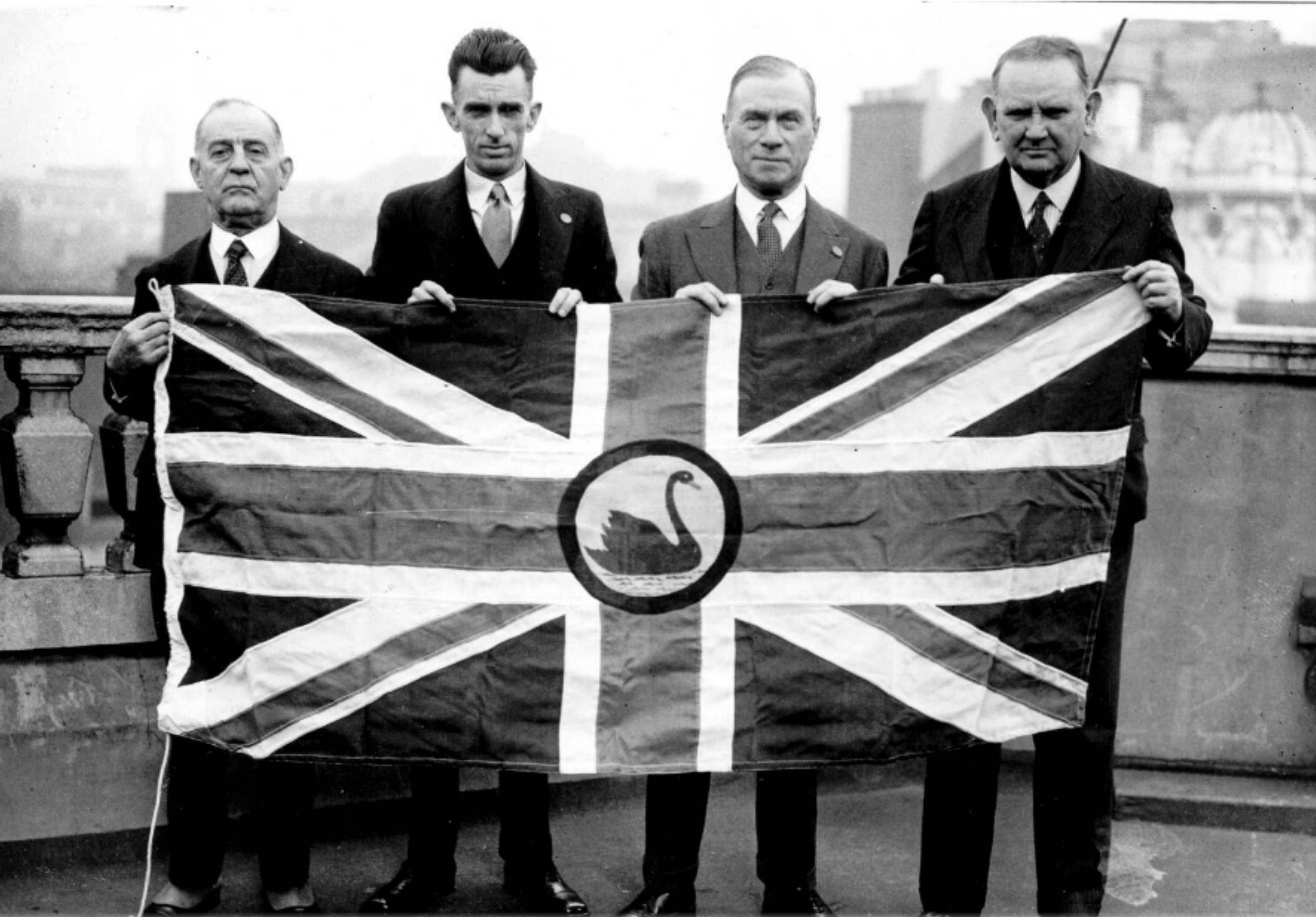
From left to right: Matthew Moss, Keith Watson, James MacCallum Smith and Hal Colebatch on top of the Savoy Hotel in London holding the Dominion Flag

On 8 April 1933, the Western Australian secession referendum occurred, in which 66.23% of electors voted in favour of seceding. The 1933 state election occurred on the same day, in which the Mitchell government was defeated by the anti-secessionist Labor party, led by Phillip Collier. Despite having worked well with Collier last time he was agent-general, Colebatch's position was precarious due to his advocacy for secession. Nevertheless, Collier chose to honour the electorate's wish by sending a delegation to London to ask the British Parliament for permission to secede. Colebatch urged for Collier to be part of the delegation but he chose not to. Colebatch was instead leader with the other members being legal advisor Matthew Moss, chairman of the Dominion League Keith Watson and vice-president of the Dominion League James MacCallum Smith.

Colebatch knew the chance of being successful was low but saw the situation as a useful bargaining chip in negotiations with the federal government as well as way to generate publicity for the state's grievances. J. H. Thomas, the Secretary of State for Dominion Affairs, told Colebatch that the British Government had no intention on allowing secession but it would nevertheless receive the delegation courteously. This pleased Colebatch, who now did not have to worry about the intricacies and consequences of secession. When Edward John Harding, the permanent under-secretary for the dominions, asked Colebatch if Western Australia really wanted to secede, he replied that the movement would subside if Western Australia received fairer treatment from the Commonwealth. The petition was presented to both houses of the Parliament of the United Kingdom in December 1934 and was then referred to a select committee which determined that although the British Parliament had the legal power to pass an act for the secession of Western Australia, it would go against constitutional conventions unless the petition came as the "clearly expressed wish of the Australian people as a whole". As a result, the British Parliament rejected the petition.

When Watson suggested armed rebellion if the petition was rejected, Colebatch issued a statement distancing the Western Australian government from these comments. The secession movement faded away after it was clear that the British Parliament was not interested. Colebatch could consider the situation a win, despite having previously advocated for secession, as the federal government soon reduced import duties on several items and it established the Commonwealth Grants Commission to advise the government on the distribution of grants to the states. The federal government also began spending more on defence in Western Australia; it had spent almost nothing prior to that. It created the Fremantle Fortress on Rottnest Island, which included 9.2-inch naval guns to defend Fremantle.

=== Other ===
In 1933, Colebatch issued an invitation to tender for the construction of a new generator at East Perth Power Station. He was frustrated when he was forced to accept a British tender rather than a German tender which was £40,000 cheaper because the German tender was subject to import duties worth more than £40,000. He also arranged the purchase of the MV Koolama and new railcars and trolleybuses. After Australia increased duties on imported glassware, the Belgian Government retaliated by blocking imports on Australian goods, which affected the apple and meat industry in Western Australia. Colebatch was able to convince the Minister for Commerce, Earle Page, to negotiate with Belgium to reopen trade. Colebatch also proposed an Australian Trade Council which was to consist of the agents-general and the high commissioner to the United Kingdom. This was accepted by the premiers in 1934 but did not eventuate as High Commissioner Stanley Bruce did not want to do so.

Colebatch became a liveryman of the Worshipful Company of Glass Sellers in December 1935 and a liveryman of the Worshipful Company of Fishmongers some time later. He also became a freeman of the City of London. He represented Australia at the funeral of King George V and the coronation of King George VI. He was a member of the Council of the Imperial Society of Knights Bachelor. When Collier decided he wanted Mitchell to be the next lieutenant governor of Western Australia, (Note: The position of lieutenant governor was used instead of governor from 1931 to 1948 as a cost-saving measure as lieutenant governors get paid less.) Colebatch negotiated with the Dominions Office for Mitchell to be appointed. Up until that point, all governors had been British-born and the British Government wanted to ensure that the appointment of Mitchell did not rule out appointing British governors in the future.

In 1936, Colebatch was reappointed Agent-General. He went on a tour of Scandinavia at the beginning of 1936, having received invitations from the Anglo-Swedish and Anglo-Danish societies to give a series of lectures on Australian products. He accepted the invitations on the condition that he was not paid for his lectures. After that, he went to Germany with Albert Edward Heath, the agent-general for New South Wales, and Arthur Balfour, 1st Baron Riverdale. The official reason for visiting Germany was to go to the Leipzig Trade Fair, but he also met with several anti-fascist Germans who sought to open Germany to trade with the outside world, as well as several Nazi political figures such as Hjalmar Schacht and Joachim von Ribbentrop. He later went on a lecture tour of England and Scotland for the Overseas League, where he urged for Britain to adopt conscription. When the Perth Trades Hall heard about this, it urged the state government to sack Colebatch.

In mid-1937, Colebatch returned to Germany with Heath and G. H. Morrison, an Australian journalist living in Germany, to attend the International Chamber of Commerce in Berlin. Colebatch described the event as propaganda designed to impress the delegates. He was also given a tour of a labour camp and a concentration camp, possibly Sachsenhausen. Colebatch described the camp as "specially selected for display to visitors". In February 1939, he gave the centenary address to the Cobden Club. Albeit keen to continue as agent-general, when Colebatch's term was up in 1939, a former Labor minister, Frank Troy, was appointed in his place. Colebatch then returned to Perth.

== Back in Australia ==
During World War II, Colebatch was the vice-president of the State Executive Committee for raising war funds. Brian De Garis wrote that "he could take satisfaction in the good record of Western Australia in this respect, for it raised more per head in War Savings Certificates than the wealthier and more populous states." He used his position in The Northam Advertiser to urge readers to take the war seriously and prepare the country for what was to come, as well as further advocate for conscription.

Colebatch was again elected to the Legislative Council, this time to the Metropolitan Province, taking his seat in July 1940. At this time, he was living in Lawson Flats in the Perth central business district. He believed that parliament could use his experience in local, national and international affairs during the war. Among the things he opposed was legislation designed to prevent foreigners from growing potatoes, and a bill to amend the Parliamentary Allowances Act to increase the retirement payments for MPs. He was also the chairman of the Royal Commission into the Care and Reform of Youthful Delinquents.

Colebatch contested the 1948 Western Australian Legislative Council election as one of two candidates endorsed by the Liberal Party for his seat. The party did not want Colebatch elected though, and only helped the other candidate. Colebatch lost the election as a result.

== Death ==
After a short illness, Colebatch died on 12 February 1953 at Royal Perth Hospital. He received a state funeral on 13 February at St George's Cathedral. Despite the state election occurring on the following day, the pallbearers included Premier Ross McLarty, Chief Secretary Victor Doney, Speaker Charles North, Deputy Opposition Leader John Tonkin, President of the Legislative Council Harold Seddon, Clerk of the Legislative Assembly F. E. Islip, Lord Mayor of Perth Joseph Totterdell, Frank Gibson, George Lowe Sutton, William Pickering and Sydney Stubbs. Federal Minister for Territories Paul Hasluck represented the Commonwealth Government. His net worth at the time of his death was only slightly above £2000, owning no house or car. He was buried at Karrakatta Cemetery.

== Personal life ==
Although he was brought up Anglican, he was not an active member of any church and his religious beliefs were vague and undefined.

Colebatch married Mary Maud Saunders (1869–1940) on 29 April 1896 in St George's Cathedral. They had two sons: Harley Colebatch and Gordon Lindsay Colebatch. Both sons fought in France during World War I and Gordon was severely injured by a shell burst. Mary Maud Saunders died on 20 January 1940.

At a social function at Parliament House, Colebatch met Marion Frances Gibson (1911–1975), an Army Nursing Sister and daughter of politician Frank Gibson. They married at St Andrew's Church, Perth, on either 21 or 22 December 1944 and had one son together: Hal Gibson Pateshall Colebatch.

== Notes ==
Parliament of Australia
Preceded by Charles Graham; Ted Needham	Senator for Western Australia; 1 July 1929 – 20 March 1933; Served alongside: George Pearce, Patrick Lynch, Walter Kingsmill, William Carroll, Bertie Johnston	Succeeded by Herbert Collett
Parliament of Western Australia
Preceded by Warren Marwick	Member for East Province; 22 May 1912 – 17 June 1923; Served alongside: Vernon Hamersley, Thomas Wilding, Charles Baxter	Succeeded by William Carroll
Preceded by James Franklin	Member for Metropolitan Province; 22 May 1940 – 21 May 1948; Served alongside: Leonard Bolton, James Gordon Hislop	Succeeded by Keith Watson; Harry Hearn
Political offices
Preceded by Henry Lefroy	Premier of Western Australia; 17 April 1919 – 17 May 1919	Succeeded by Sir James Mitchell
Preceded by Thomas Walker	Minister for Education; 27 July 1916 – 17 June 1923	Succeeded by John Ewing
New title	Minister for Public Health; 17 May 1919 – 3 April 1921	Succeeded by Frank Broun
