= Warren Marwick =

Australian politician (1869–1955)

Member of the Western Australian Legislative Council
- In office 26 September 1910 – 21 May 1912 Serving with Vernon Hamersley, Thomas Wilding
- Preceded by: George Throssell
- Succeeded by: Hal Colebatch
- Constituency: East Province

Personal details
- Born: 5 August 1869 York, Western Australia, Australia
- Died: 12 March 1955 (aged 85) Albany, Western Australia, Australia
- Resting place: York Cemetery
- Spouse(s): Susannah Collins (m. 1875; died 1938) Lenore Flanagan née Kerr (m. 1944; died 1947)
- Children: 7, including Thomas Marwick
- Parents: William Marwick (father); Mary Anne Taylor- Batty (mother)
- Occupation: Farmer and businessperson

Warren Marwick (5 August 1869 – 12 March 1955) was an Australian politician and founding director of Wesfarmers.

== Early life ==
Marwick was born on 5 August 1869 in York, Western Australia to Mary Batty Taylor and William Marwick, a farmer. He was educated in York and his religion was Catholic.

Beginning in 1886, he worked as a farmer, taking up 1,000 acres (400 ha). Places he farmed in included Yorkrakine and York. He also worked on clearing a road and constructing a telegraph line to Southern Cross, and drove horse-drawn coaches in the Eastern Goldfields from 1892 to 1897. In 1908, he purchased the York Flour Mill. By 1910, he had 1,000 acres (400 ha) of land.

== Career ==
Warren Marwick was a founding director of Wesfarmers where he served 37 years into its development.

Marwick was at various points in the 1900s, 1910s and 1920s a member of the York Road Board and the York Municipal Council.

George Throssell died on 30 August 1910, necessitating a by-election for the East Province of the Western Australian Legislative Council. Marwick contested the by-election, as did Hal Colebatch, a journalist from Northam, and David Morrell, a farmer from Northam. Marwick and Colebatch both supported reform of the Legislative Council property franchise whereas Morrell did not. The election occurred on 26 September 1910, and Marwick won, receiving 714 primary votes comparted to Colebatch's 537 and Morrell's 341. Marwick won all centres except for Northam, which was won by Colebatch.

By 1912, Marwick had become unpopular in Northam due to his opinion on the proposed route for the transcontinental railway line. The most likely route was to be via Midland and Northam, where there was already a line, but there was an alternative proposal via Armadale and Brookton, which is also in the East Province. Marwick chose to support the Armadale-Brookton route, which resulted in his unpopularity within Northam. Colebatch was originally not going to contest the 1912 election, but after a public meeting in Northam decided that a better candidate must contest the East Province, Colebatch became a last-minute candidate. Colebatch supported the transcontinental railway line passing through Northam and a developmental railway being built from Armadale to Brookton. The only other candidate was Thomas Brimage, a former Liberal politician who had joined the Labor Party a year earlier. Only Marwick and Colebatch had any chance of winning. Colebatch defeated Marwick, beating him by a small margin in every polling place except for in York. The final result was 1495 votes to Colebatch, 863 votes to Marwick, and 481 votes to Brimage.

== Personal life and death ==
On 6 June 1894, Marwick married Susannah Collins at St Patrick's Catholic Church, York. They had four daughters and three sons, including Thomas Marwick, who became a member of the Parliament of Australia in the Senate and the House of Representatives. Collins died on 22 June 1938. Marwick's second marriage was to Lenore Flanagan née Kerr, a widow of William Flanagan. She died on 8 October 1947; no children resulted from that marriage. Marwick died on 12 March 1955 in Albany, Western Australia. He was buried in York Cemetery.

Western Australian Legislative Council
Preceded by George Throssell	Member for East Province; 26 September 1910 – 21 May 1912; Served alongside: Vernon Hamersley, Thomas Wilding	Succeeded by Hal Colebatch
