= Hocking and Company =

Australian publishing company

Hocking and Company Pty. Ltd. was a publishing company based in Kalgoorlie, Western Australia. It was founded in 1896 by Sidney Edwin Hocking.

It published the daily newspaper The Kalgoorlie Miner. The company maintained a lengthy relationship with the goldfields community as publisher and local patron of community activities.

The Hocking family kept the company operational until selling it to The West Australian in 1970.

== Newspapers ==
- Kalgoorlie Miner newspaper, 1895–present
- Western Argus newspaper, 1894–1938
