= Second Mitchell ministry =

The Second Mitchell Ministry was the 17th Ministry of the Government of Western Australia and was led by Nationalist Premier Sir James Mitchell. It succeeded the First Collier Ministry on 23 April 1930, following the defeat of the Labor government at the 1930 election on 26 March.

The ministry served at the height of the Great Depression. During its term, Norbert Keenan resigned from the cabinet following a dispute with the Premier, and Thomas Davy, widely touted as a future party leader, died.

The ministry was followed by the Collier Ministry on 24 April 1933 after the Nationalist coalition lost government at the state election held on 8 April. Half of the Ministry lost their parliamentary seats at the election, including the Premier.

The following ministers served, except where noted, for the duration of the Ministry:

| Office | Minister |
|---|---|
| Premier; Colonial Treasurer | Sir James Mitchell, KCMG, MLA |
| Minister for Lands; Minister for Immigration; Minister for Public Health | Charles Latham, MLA |
| Attorney-General; Minister for Education (from 19 September 1931) | Thomas Davy, KC, MLA (until 18 February 1933) |
| Minister for Railways; Minister for Mines; Minister for Police; Minister for Forests; Minister for Industry | John Scaddan, CMG, MLA |
| Minister for Public Works; Minister for Labour | John Lindsay, MLA |
| Chief Secretary; Minister for Education | Norbert Keenan, KC, MLA (until 19 September 1931) |
| Chief Secretary (from 19 September 1931); Minister for Country Water Supplies; Minister for Trading Concerns | Charles Baxter, MLC |
| Minister for Agriculture | Percy Ferguson, MLC |
| Attorney-General; Minister for Education | Hubert Parker, MLA (from 24 February 1933) |

Legend:

Nationalist Party
Country Party

| Preceded by First Collier Ministry | Second Mitchell Ministry; 1930–1933 | Succeeded by Second Collier Ministry |
