= 1919 Fremantle Wharf riot =

Workers' strike at Fremantle Harbour

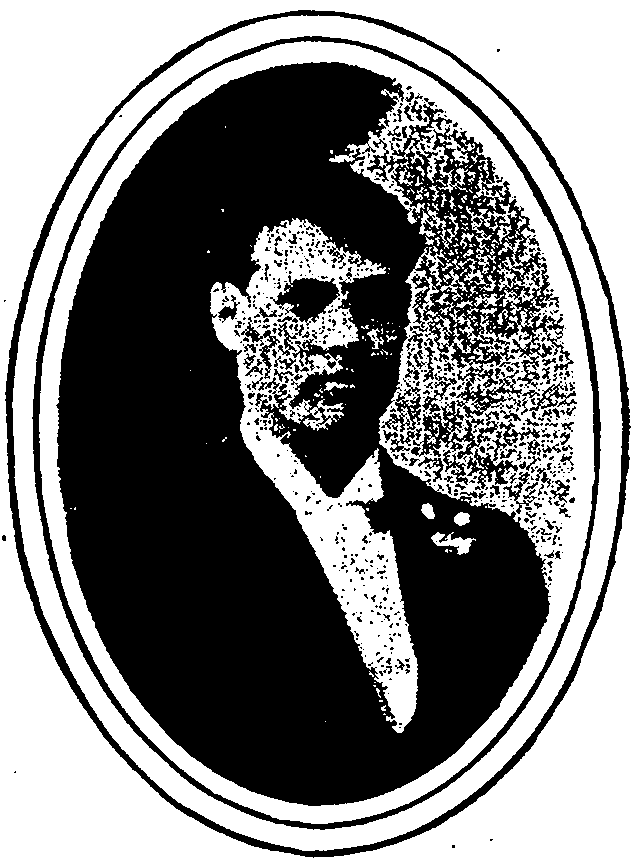
- Tom Edwards was killed in the riot
- Date: 4 May 1919
- Location: Fremantle Harbour
- Participants: Waterside Workers' Federation; Fremantle Lumpers Union; Western Australia Police
- Deaths: 1 – Tom Edwards
- Injuries: 33
- Coroner: E.P. Dowley

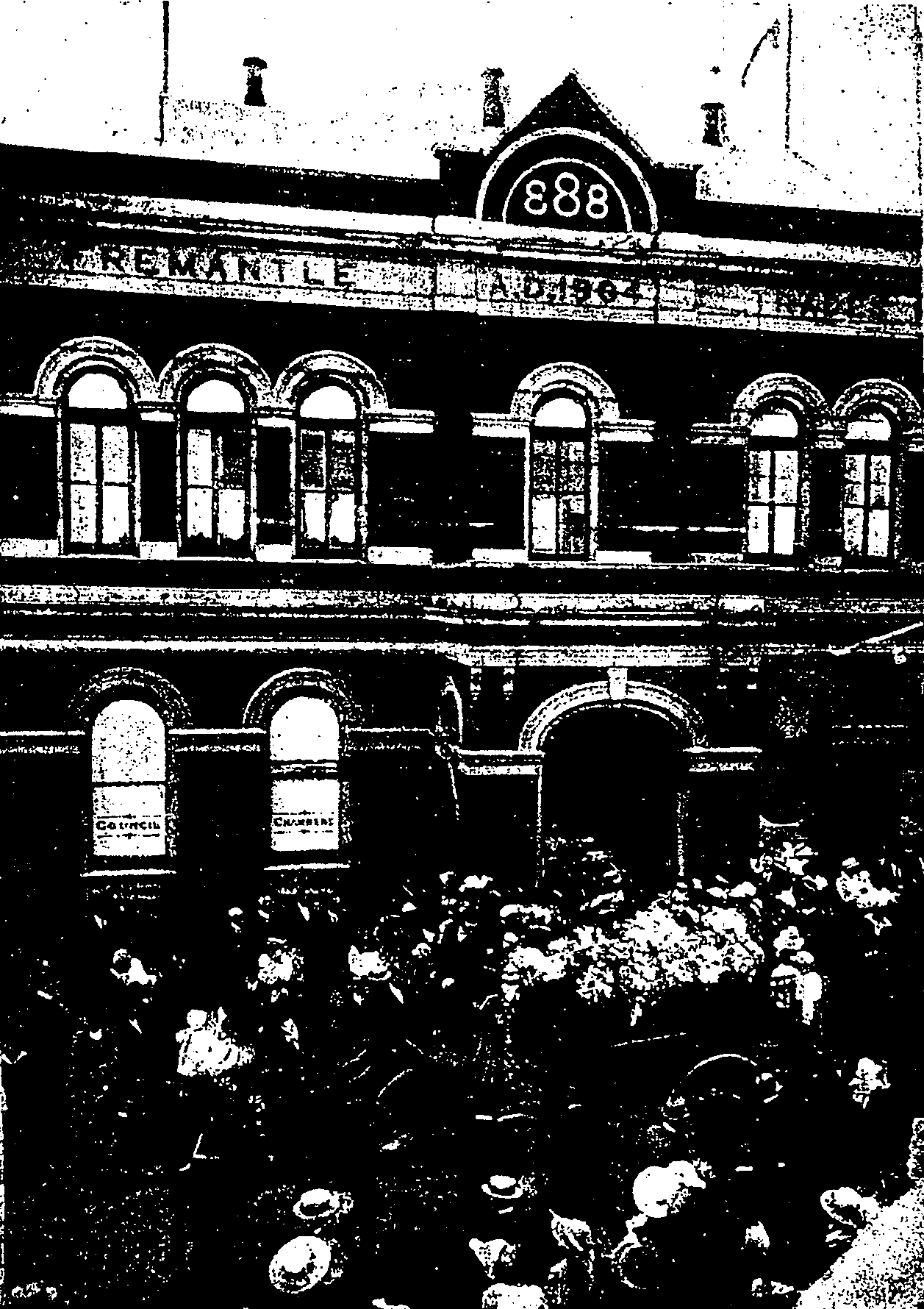
Thomas Edwards' funeral cortege outside Fremantle Trades Hall

The 1919 Fremantle Wharf riot, also known as the Battle of the Barricades, arose out of a strike by stevedores in Fremantle, Western Australia in 1919. The strike was called by the Waterside Workers' Federation (WWF) over the use of National Waterside Workers Union (NWWU) workers to unload the quarantined ship Dimboola, and escalated into fatal violence when WWF workers and supporters attempted to prevent NWWU members from carrying out the work.

== Background ==
In 1917, the Fremantle Lumpers Union refused to load ships that they believed were destined to take supplies to Germany, then an enemy nation. This belief was denied by the government of the day (but was later proven to be correct), and in response the shipowners and government brought in strike-breakers under the National Waterside Workers Union banner. This was intended to be only for the job at hand, but the NWWU labour continued to be employed after the immediate need, and despite their willingness the WWF workers were prevented from returning to work for some time.

== Riot ==
On 4 May 1919, the WWF were blockading the wharf to prevent the NWWU workers from reaching Dimboola. The NWWU workers, however, arrived in boats down the river, accompanied by the recently appointed Western Australian Premier, Hal Colebatch. In the fracas, Tom Edwards, a union worker, was attempting to assist the WWF president William Renton when he was struck on the head by a police baton. He died three days later at Fremantle Hospital.

== Aftermath ==
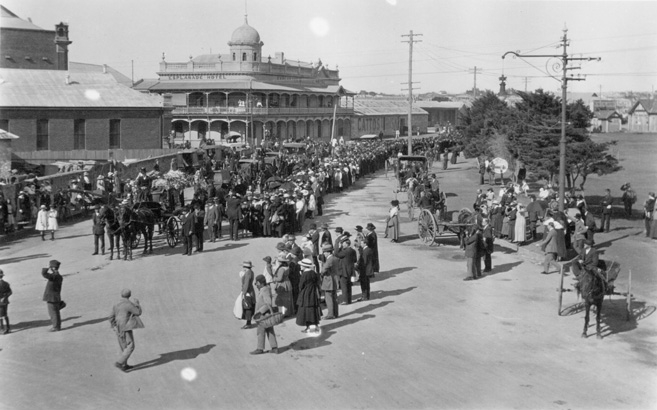
Thomas Charles Edwards' funeral procession

The funeral of Edwards at Fremantle Cemetery attracted a large crowd numbering into the thousands including fellow wharf workers and most members of the Western Australian parliamentary Labor Party.

An inquest into the riot found that Edwards' death was accidental.

A memorial fountain was sculpted by Pietro Porcelli in Edwards' honour. It was located over time in a number of locations and is now found in Kings Square.
