= William Marwick =

William Marwick (1833-1925) was a settler who came from England in 1852 as an 18-year-old boy, to York, Western Australia, and "by sheer industry, perseverance and enterprise" built up a large carting and fodder business, and amassed large land holdings. He was closely involved in the opening up of the goldfields in the 1880s and 1890s.

== Early years ==
Marwick was born in Emneth near Ely, England on 2 May 1833. At the age of 17, he left for Australia on the Sir Walter Raleigh along with a number of others from his district. On board the ship, he was chosen as constable to supervise 26 other young men during the voyage. "It was my job to see they kept the place clean and tidy". Marwick turned 18 during the voyage. The ship arrived in Fremantle on 31 May 1852. On 14 July 1852, Marwick left Perth to travel 100 kilometres on foot to Tipperary, near York, to work for Samuel Evans Burges. According to family stories, he walked the distance in one day.

At this time, because of the arrival of convicts in Western Australia, there was plenty of work available, "wages were low and men were plentiful". "There were hundreds of friendly natives in the locality, but for four months at a time I never saw a white man."

Marwick wrote further about his first year in York in letters to the Eastern Districts Chronicle in 1917:

It was a very dry year when I came in 1852. Only late rains fell; no water in the bush gullies. Never had any water in. Fitzgerald was Governor then. I believe his pay was £400 per year and house – well paid for his work. I was at that time 11 stone and 5 feet 11 inches high, and was offered £1 a month and tucker and find my own knife, fork and pannikin, and bed and rugs, or do without, which I had to do until others were finished using them.

I worked for the first month for 30s and nothing better. I worked on the same farm for 12 months for £20, and three months for £2 a month, and then started shepherding at £2 10s per month. By this time I had got used to the conditions of WA life. I saw as fine linen as ever were in this State or any other in the 50s working for £1 pound per month and tucker, rough but plenty of it. But you always had to carry your own rug and bed if you wanted one.

== Sandalwood trade ==
After a period when he was leasing land from Samuel Evans Burges, which he cleared and farmed, in about 1858, Marwick became a sandalwood cutter and sub-let his farm. He arranged a deal with Burges to cut and deliver three tons of sandalwood each week, provided he had the exclusive right to cut sandalwood for himself on Burges's government leases.

Well about 1858 there was a revival of the sandalwood trade in a small way, and so it went on for three or four years. I had gone at it with all my means - I had plenty of that - together with horses and pigs and corn and flour. I used to pay my men with orders on my master, (Note: Burges) and my banker was Mr Samuel Craig, and I would deliver sandalwood to him. I would have to go to Perth with a load to Mr JGC Carr and Mr Gull's store in Guildford.

== Marwick and the Mongers ==
In about 1861, there was a crash in the price of sandalwood. Marwick was rescued from financial difficulties by John Henry Monger Snr. (Note: In a letter to the Eastern Districts Chronicle 24 August 1917, p.3, the person giving assistance was identified by Marwick as the father of JT Monger (Joseph Taylor Monger), namely John Henry Monger Snr) who still had confidence in the sandalwood trade.:

As time went on there came a dead stop in the trade. My master had hundreds of pounds value of my sandalwood in his yard. I was in a fix as no one would advance money on it. That was a hard blow. I borrowed £25 of my master to pay for a dray I had had made, and I had to pay 15 per cent for the loan. As I had some men I explained to them that as things were bad with others as well as myself I was unable to fund money to pay them but they could do the same as I would without it - go on working for tucker, and when work came that way they could go and better themselves. I had flour and pigs and barley, but we wanted sugar, tea, tobacco and clothes. So I went to Perth with a load of sandalwood to try and barter for what I was hard up for. I was allowed to throw it down in a yard out of right, but could not get a bag of flour for the load. They all said that the Chinese had all turned Christian! So we lived as best we could. I came to York to try Mr R Meares with whom I had often bartered sandalwood at his stores. I was talking about my troubles and was telling him of my trip to Perth. I asked him if he could let me have a few things but he said he was in the same plight as myself. While we were standing in front of his store a man rode up. Mr Meares said that Mr So-and-So might help you. I told him my troubles and looking at me he wrote on a piece of paper and told me to go to the stores on the hill and give it to Mr White and get what I wanted - and I did so.

As a result, Marwick was able to continue to work throughout the slump and keep his teams of cutters.

I ... purchased a team, and for 20 years carted between York and Fremantle, the journey to and fro taking seven days. Life and property were safe in those days, and during the time I travelled the road was never once interfered with.

In 1864, he was the first to cart from York all the way to Fremantle and back. Marwick's teams were the first to use the Fremantle Bridge after it was completed in 1866. He was also the first to cart from York to Albany and back.

Marwick was mainly carting sandalwood for the Mongers (Note: He was dealing with both Joseph Taylor Monger with whom he developed a relationship, but also with John Henry Monger Jnr.) and worked so much in association with John Henry Monger Jnr that he even appeared to be in partnership as he spoke of "Mr Monger and I [having] men here, there and everywhere, from Albany Old Road to Kalgoorlie...".

On Monger's advice, Marwick began to buy land in and around York, and built himself a house...... Monger bought up 25 grants at Red Swamp Hill in the York area and sold them to Marwick for the same price he had paid for them.

== Henry Beard and Mary Ann Batty ==
Marwick was friends with former convict and baker Henry Beard and his de facto wife Mary Ann Taylor - Batty. On 7 April 1864, Henry Beard was tried and convicted of sheep stealing. He was sentenced to seven years gaol. Marwick petitioned for his release a number of times but these petitions were unsuccessful. William settled in with Mary Ann Taylor-Batty in York and they had six children together, including future politician Warren Marwick, a founder of Wesfarmers. They lived a few doors away from Janet Millett.

== Dispute with Walkinshaw Cowan ==
Resident Magistrate Walkinshaw Cowan kept pigs at his home which frequently wandered to Marwick's wheat stack. Marwick could not seek the assistance of the pound-keeper because he was James Cowan, Walkinshaw's son (born 1848), who Cowan had appointed pound-keeper, as well as Postmaster and Magistrate's clerk in 1864, when he was 16. In March 1866, Marwick impounded 8 pigs, but released them on Cowan saying that if he claimed damages from the pound-keeper, Cowan would pay. Marwick claimed damages but James Cowan, the pound-keeper did not recognise any damages and said Marwick should take the matter to the magistrate, who was of course Walkinshaw Cowan. Marwick resorted to writing to the paper, complaining about the situation and Cowan's 16-year-old boy being appointed pound-keeper.

Several letters were written complaining about Marwick, one claiming he was semi-literate and under the influence of a former convict.

== 1870s and 1880s ==
By the mid-1870s, Marwick's business had grown to considerable size. An advertisement on 24 November 1877 offered timber and other building materials for sale, and horses and drays for hire, as well as carting "to any part of the Colony".

Marwick's Shed was built in about 1876.

On behalf of Monger, Marwick bought new breeds of pig and cattle to improve breeding in the York district.

In 1884, he went to Albany with Edward Keane, railway contractor, (Note: for whom Marwick had selected, stocked and superintended about 14,000 acres of pastoral land in the Avon Valley) to meet Anthony Hordern III and convey him to York over the prospective route of the Great Southern Railway, which Hordern was promoting to investors in England. Marwick continued to run teams to Fremantle and back until the York railway line was completed in 1885. He was then principally engaged in farming pursuits.

== Opening up the goldfields ==
Following the discovery of gold in the Yilgarn in 1887, in Marwick's words:

I left York along Hunt's track, and afterwards branched off and established a track to Golden Valley. I opened up this road by despatching teams from York, and in 1888, accompanied by Messrs Monger and Luke, left York for the purpose of looking for pastoral country to the east. We came close to the Londonderry along Hunt's track, and on behalf of the late Mr J H Monger and myself took up 100,000 acres at Mount Monger, 50,000 acres at Mount Burgess, and 40,000 acres at Woolgangie. 1888 was a good season, there being plenty of food and water obtainable throughout the trip. On returning to what is known as Southern Cross we met the prospectors (Risely and party) who had only discovered it a few days before. I afterwards opened a direct road from York to Southern Cross, and on behalf of the Government excavated tanks and dams along the route. I sent the first teams to Southern Cross, and in 1892 when Barley rode in with the gold and reported his great find, I despatched the first teams that ever arrived in Coolgardie with provisions, consigned to Messrs Wisdom; Counsel, Tobias and other pioneer firms.

I was bondsman for the mail contractor for the service between York and Southern Cross, and on his failing to continue I was called upon by the Government to take it up or forfeit the amount of the bond. I ran coaches from the head of the Yilgarn line to Southern Cross until April 1894, when in conjunction with Messrs Saw, Wilkinson, Milne, Farren and Wilson, I started the Coolgardie Coaching Company, and for months we experienced very bad times, water being 1s per gallon, and horsefeed correspondingly high. In August we purchased Mr Cohn's plant and secured the title of Cobb & Co. After the railway started from Southern Cross, we experienced brighter times, owing to good rains and increased traffic.

Marwick disposed of his interest in Cobb & Co in January 1896.

== Retirement and death ==
Marwick retired in 1897. By that time he had built up large farming and pastoral interests in the York district. He travelled to England and America. He returned to Australia and toured the Eastern States, and in 1905 married Mary Ann in York. He returned to England to live in Wisbech, not far from his birthplace. He returned to Western Australia again in 1914, visiting his old friend Frank Craig in Balingup and touring the South-West. He died in 1925 aged 91, and Mary Ann died the following year in York. By the time of his death he had amassed considerable wealth.
