= Fremantle Lumpers Union =

Organised labour on Fremantle wharves

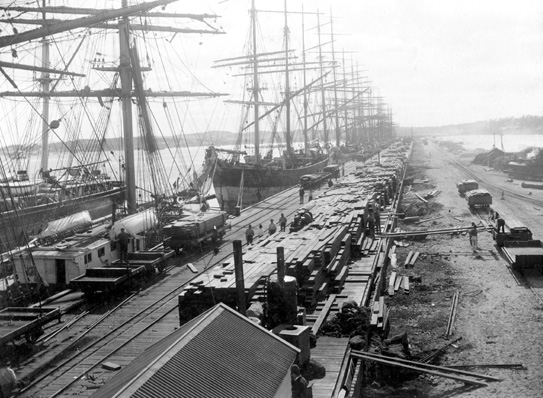
Sailing ships Fremantle Harbour 1899

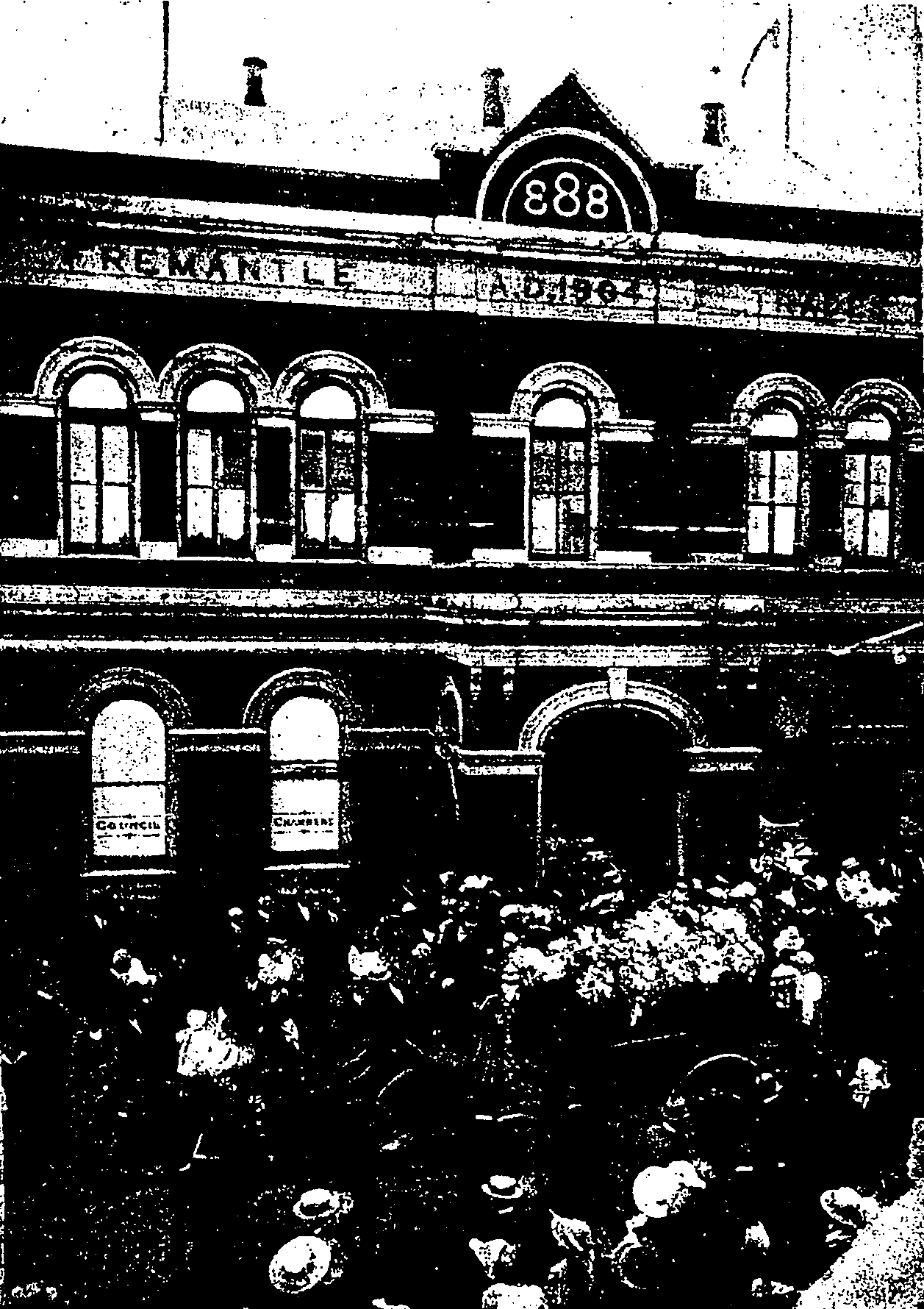
Thomas Edwards' funeral cortege outside Fremantle Trades Hall

The Fremantle Lumpers Union was a trade union formed in 1889 and active until 1946 when it became part of the Waterside Workers' Federation, Fremantle Branch. It was the first union to represent unskilled workers formed in Western Australia.

The union was formed in 1889 to represent unskilled workers on the Fremantle wharves when the Adelaide Lumpers' Union started a recruiting drive to the west. Many workers joined, thought to be inspired by the London Dock strike of 1889 and the solidarity shown between the workers. The inaugural secretary of the union was Mr. Clifford.

The president of the Union in 1890 was Arthur James Diamond, the vice-president was T. Smith, and the secretary was J. Scott. Diamond left the union in 1891 to head to the eastern states of Australia.

J.P. Rasmussen was the secretary of the union in 1895. The lumpers went on strike in 1899 as a result of non-union labour being used on the wharf; the strike lasted for over four weeks. Rasmussen remained as secretary until 1899 when he left the position.

The union was involved in the 1919 Fremantle Wharf riot when the state had been isolated by an outbreak of the influenza virus and a waterside workers strike. Premier Hal Colebatch, had intervened in a dispute involving the unloading of a coastal trader, SS Dimboola. The violence escalated when Lumpers Union members threw missiles at a launch carrying Colebatch and strikebreakers who were attempting to start unloading the vessel. Police retaliated and shots were fired. During the violence a lumper named Tom Edwards was fatally injured and died three days later.

In 1910 the Lumpers Union joined the Waterside Workers' Federation but broke way again in 1933 following a dispute with the Federation executive over collection of union dues. They reaffiliated in 1946.

In Fremantle Cemetery there are 39 headstones that were erected by, or with assistance from, the Union.
