= First Collier ministry =

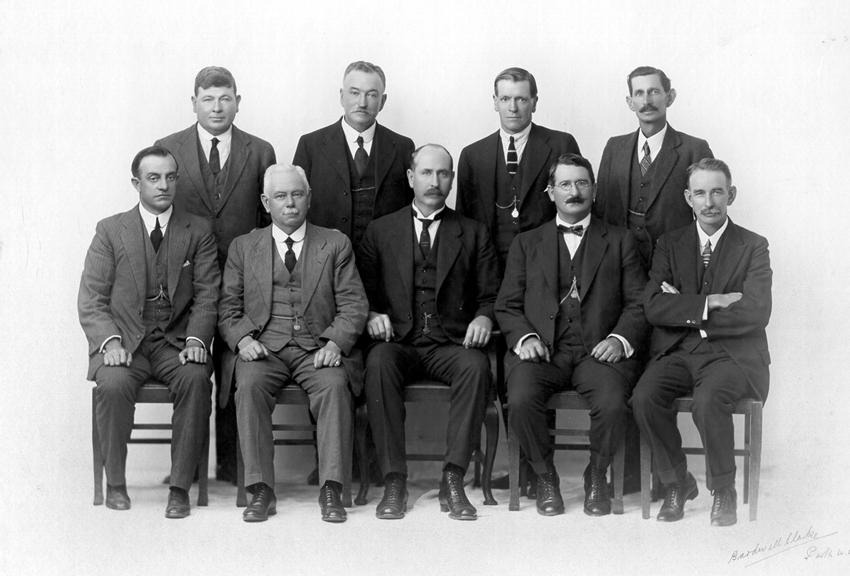
The Collier Ministry, c. 1924 Back row: Cunningham, Drew, Munsie, Hickey Front row: McCallum, Angwin, Collier, Willcock, Troy

The First Collier Ministry was the 16th Ministry of the Government of Western Australia and was led by Labor Premier Philip Collier. It succeeded the First Mitchell Ministry on 16 April 1924, following the defeat of the Nationalist government at the 1924 election on 22 March.

The ministry was followed by the Second Mitchell Ministry on 23 April 1930 after the Labor Party lost government at the state election held on 26 March.

== First Ministry ==
The following ministers served until the reconstitution of the Ministry on 30 April 1927, following the 1927 state election:

Office	Minister
Premier; Colonial Treasurer; Minister for Forests	Philip Collier, MLA
Minister for Lands; Minister for Immigration	William Angwin, MLA
Minister for Mines; Minister for Agriculture	Michael Troy, MLA
Minister for Railways; Minister for Justice	John Willcock, MLA
Minister for Works	Alick McCallum, MLA
Chief Secretary; Minister for Education	John Drew, MLC
Minister without portfolio	James Hickey, MLC
Minister without portfolio	James Cunningham, MLA
Minister without portfolio	Selby Munsie, MLA

== Second Ministry ==
The following ministers served from their appointment on 30 April 1927 until the end of the Ministry on 23 April 1930, following the 1930 state election:

Office	Minister
Premier; Colonial Treasurer; Minister for Forests	Philip Collier, MLA
Minister for Railways; Minister for Justice	John Willcock, MLA
Minister for Lands; Minister for Immigration	Michael Troy, MLA
Minister for Mines; Minister for Health	Selby Munsie, MLA
Minister for Agriculture	Harry Millington, MLA (from 15 December 1927)
Minister for Works	Alick McCallum, MLA
Chief Secretary; Minister for Education	John Drew, MLC
Minister for Goldfields Water Supply	James Cunningham, MLA (from 15 December 1927)
Minister without portfolio	James Hickey, MLC (until 21 May 1928)
Minister without portfolio	William Kitson, MLC (from 25 June 1928)
Minister without portfolio	Harry Millington, MLA (until 15 December 1927)
Minister without portfolio	James Cunningham, MLA (until 15 December 1927)

Preceded by First Mitchell Ministry	First Collier Ministry; 1924–1930	Succeeded by Second Mitchell Ministry
