= Harry Hearn =

Australian politician and businessman

Harry Hearn OBE (24 October 1890 - 20 March 1956) was an Australian politician and businessman. He was a Liberal Party of Australia member of the Western Australian Legislative Council from 1948 until his death, representing Metropolitan Province.

== Biography ==
Hearn was born at High Wycombe in Buckinghamshire, England, where he entered the furniture-making trade. He migrated to Western Australia in 1912, and along with his brother Ernest, formed Hearn Bros and Stead Pty Ltd, based out of a converted church in Victoria Park, with each serving as joint managing directors. Their business expanded to become one of the state's most prominent furniture manufacturers, operating a two-acre site at Victoria Park and other factories in West Perth and Welshpool, and in 1950 expanded into the larger holding company Hearn Industries Ltd. He stepped down as managing director of Hearn Industries in 1954 in favour of his son Noel, but remained a board director.

He married Edith Nellie Matheson on 9 September 1914; they had one son and one daughter.

He was active in employer organisations, serving as president of the Employers' Federation of Western Australia, the Chamber of Manufactures of Western Australia and the State Furniture Trades Association and acting president of the Australian Council of Employers' Federations. He was state vice-president and Perth branch president of the Liberal Party, founder and president of conservative lobby group the Citizen Rights Association, an honorary commissioner for the Australian Comfort Fund during World War II, president of the Perth Football Club and patron of the Western Australian Motor Cycling Association.

Hearn was elected to the Legislative Council for Metropolitan Province at the 1948 biennial elections, defeating fellow Liberal Sir Hal Colebatch. He had a number of parliamentary assignments, including as a member of the Joint House Committee from 1950 to 1956, a member of the Select Committee on the Provisions of the Kauri Timber Co Ltd Agreement Bill in 1950, chairman of the Honorary Royal Commission inquiring into the Town Planning and Development Act Amendment Bill from 1951 to 1952 and chairman of the Select Committee on the Workers' Compensation Act Amendment Bill in 1954.

Hearn was appointed an Officer of the British Empire in the 1952 Queen's Birthday Honours.

In 1954 Elizabeth II embarked on a royal visit of Australia. The Western Australian Legislative Council had been using a pool cue in the Legislative Council instead of a traditional black rod. As a result of the visit Hearn paid for the Crown Jewellers to make the black rod as a gift to the Legislative Council that is used today.

== Death ==
He died in office at Roelands in 1956 and was buried at Karrakatta Cemetery.
