= Fremantle Trades Hall =

Historic building in Fremantle, Western Australia

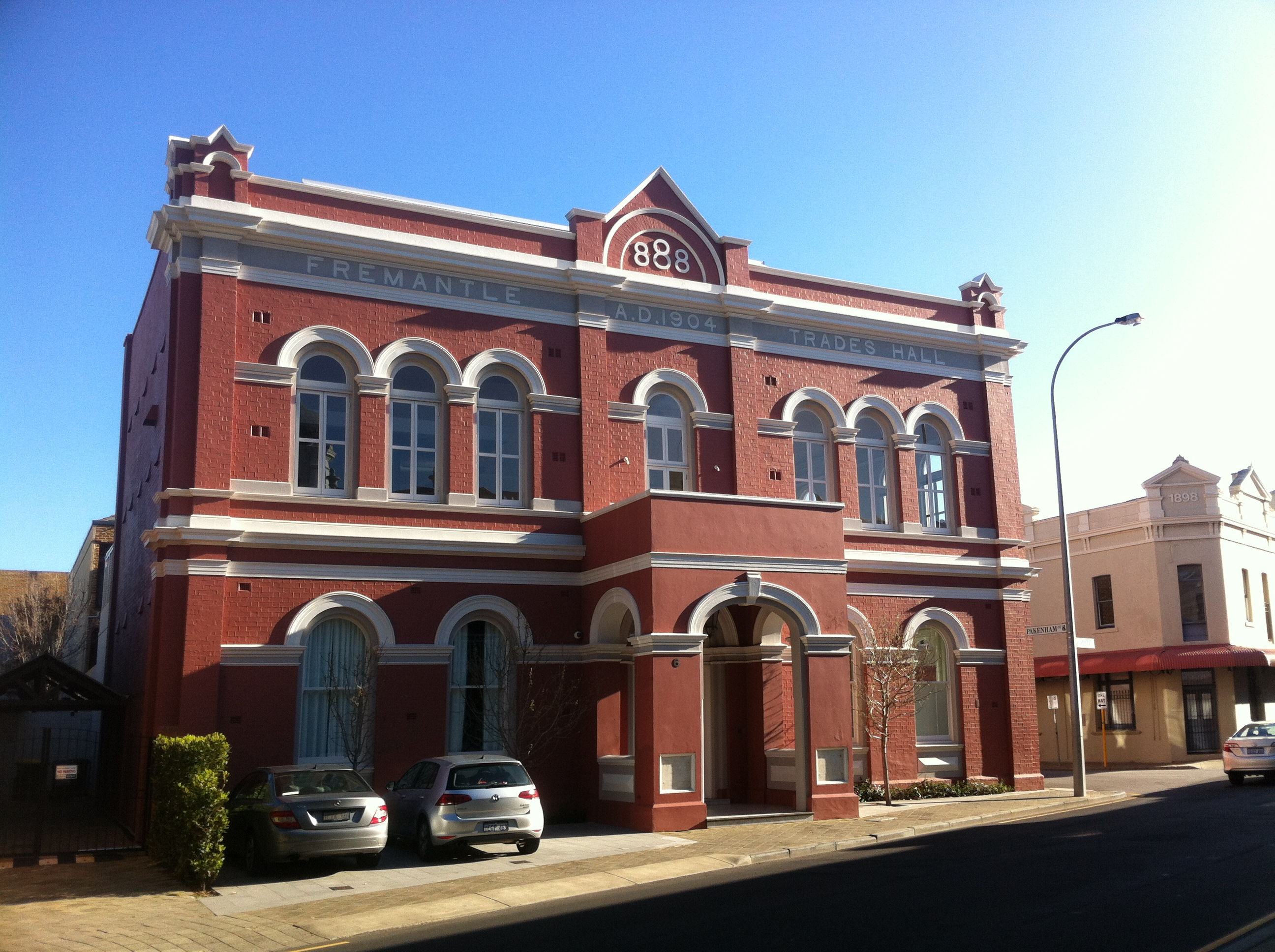
- Facade of the Fremantle Trades Hall
- Interactive map of the Fremantle Trades Hall area

General information
- Status: Heritage registered
- Type: Hall
- Location: 6 Collie Street, Fremantle, Western Australia, Australia
- Coordinates: 32.0570°S 115.7457°E
- Construction started: 26 March 1901
- Completed: 1904
- Opened: 23 January 1904

Height
- Architectural: Federation Free Classical

Technical details
- Floor count: 2

Design and construction
- Architect: Joseph F. Allen

Western Australia Heritage Register
- Type: State Registered Place
- Part of: West End, Fremantle (25225)
- Reference no.: 864

The Fremantle Trades Hall is a two-storey former trade union hall in Fremantle that was built during the gold boom period and completed in 1904. The building is located at the corner of Pakenham and Collie Streets in the west end conservation area of the city.

== Description ==
The two storey building was originally tuck pointed, is now painted and was designed in the Federation Free Classical style of architecture. It was constructed using flemish bond brick and has a corrugated iron roof. The ground floor at the centre of the façade is a frontispiece projection acting as an entryway supported by pillars which both have stone plaques and archivolt front and sides. Atop the second floor is a decorative parapet featuring a symmetrical pediment with an "888" decorative motif. Above the timber framed windows is a string course that joins the stucco arches. The entire building is set back slightly diagonally from the street and pavement. The "888" motif on the façade pediment means "8 hours work, 8 hours leisure and 8 hours sleep", which was a core belief of the union movement.

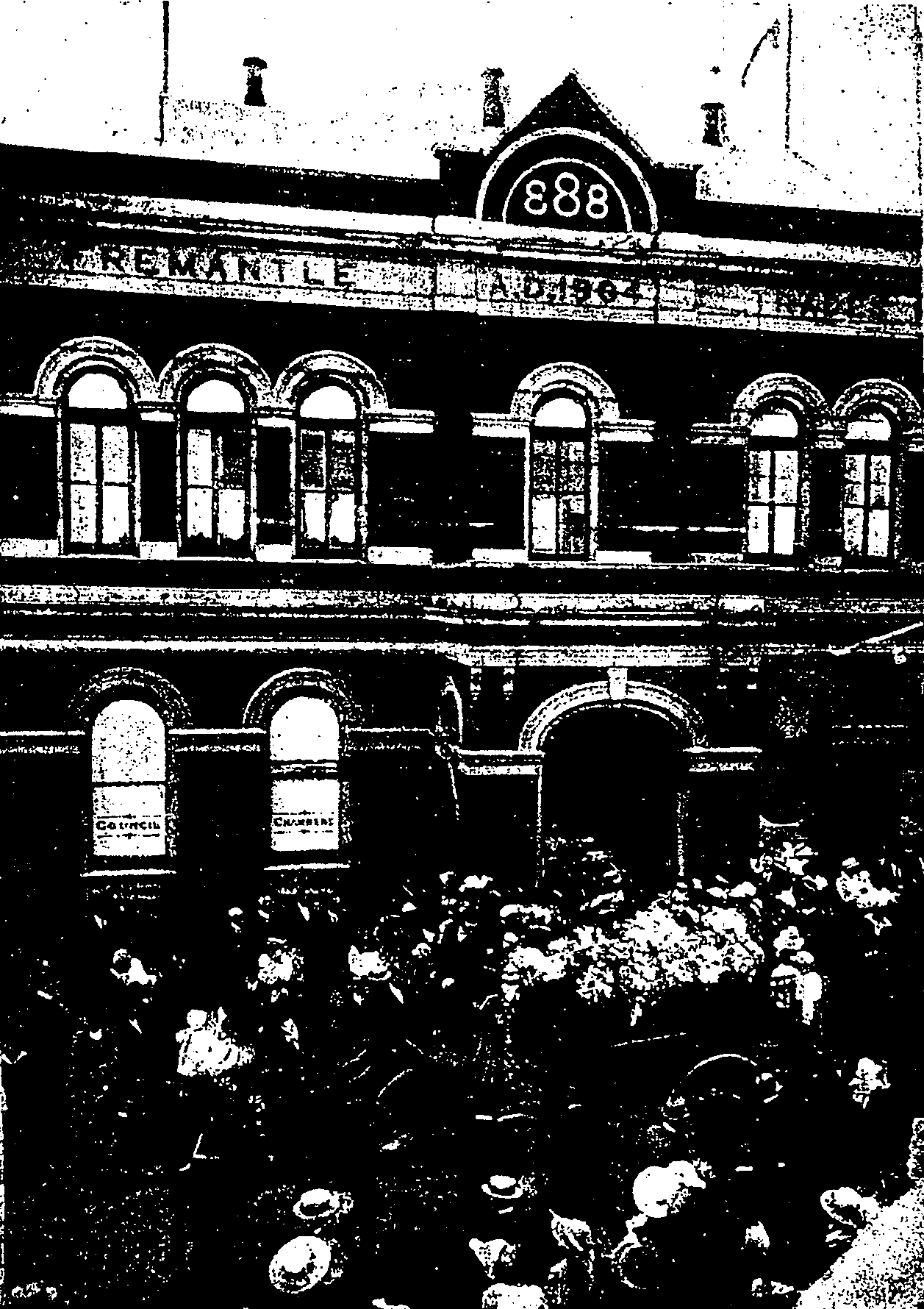
Funeral cortege of Thomas Edwards, who was killed in the 1919 Fremantle Wharf riot

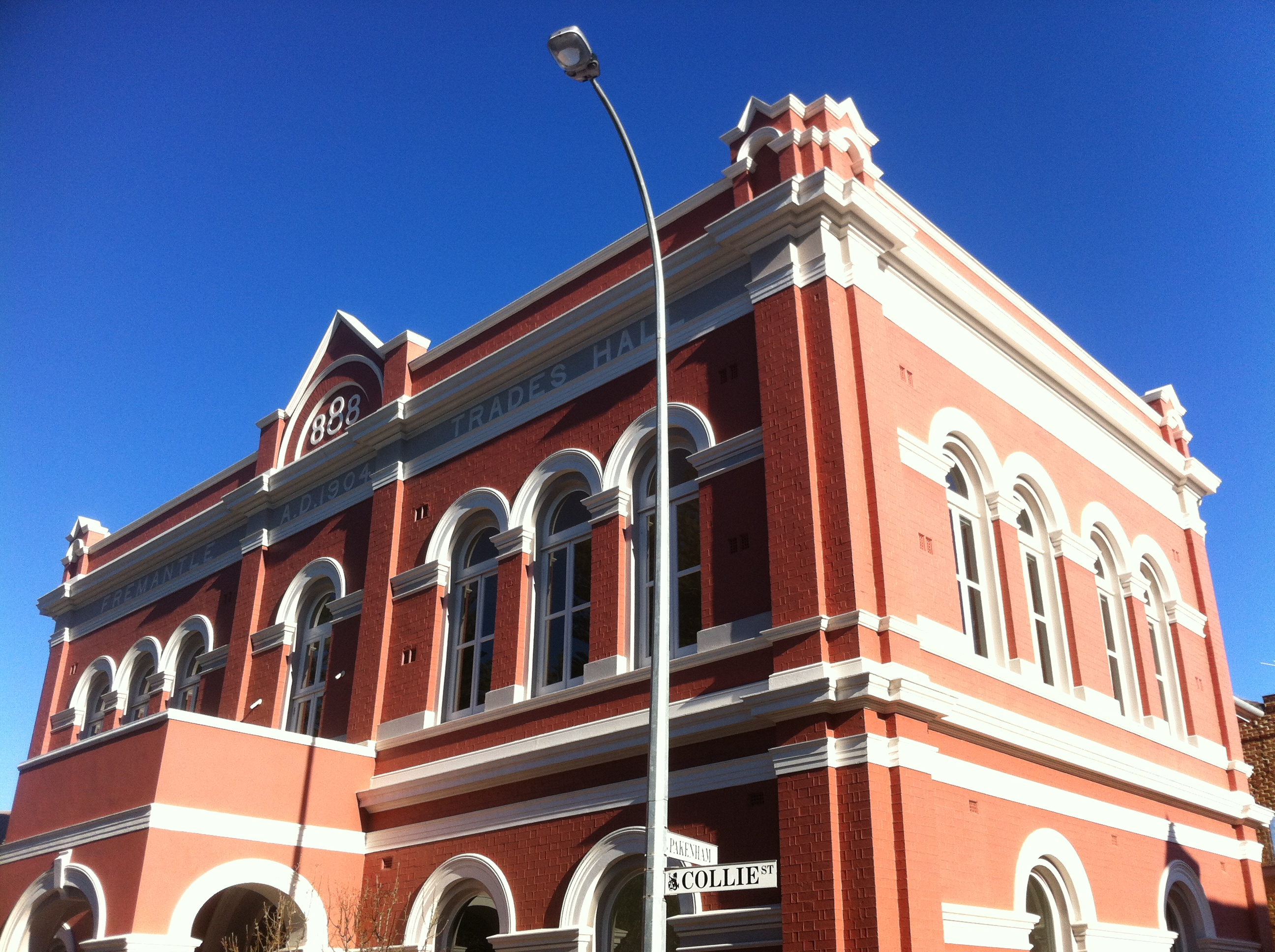
Fremantle Trades Hall from Collie Street

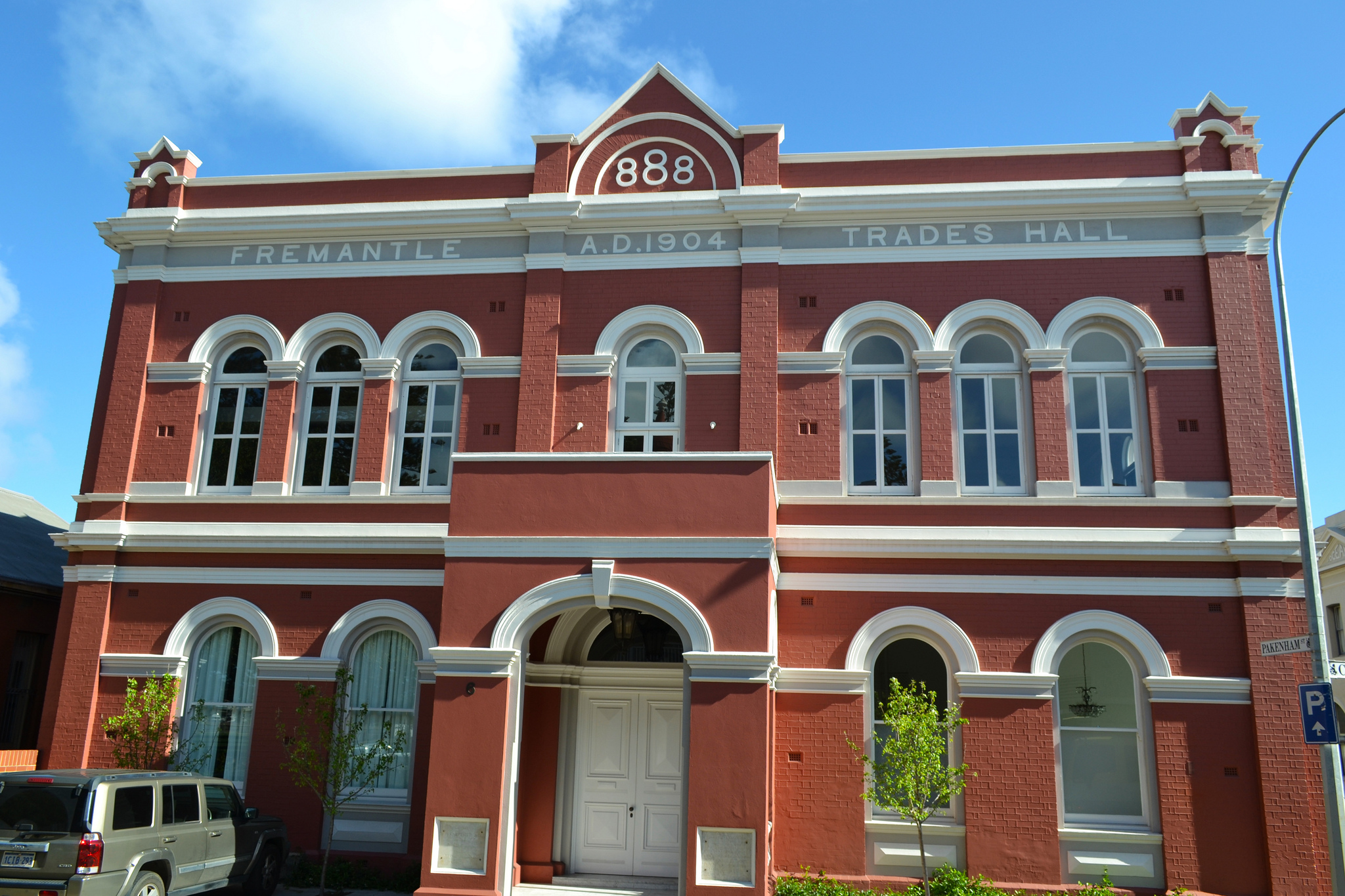
Fremantle Trades Hall

== History ==
In 1900 a delegation of about 30 trade union officials representing the engineers, lumpers, railway workers, carpenters, engine drivers and boiler makers accompanied by local members of Parliament Alfred Kidson, John Higham, Elias Solomon, Joseph John Holmes and Denis Doherty met with Premier John Forrest to discuss the Government providing a site for a hall, or, if no site were available, providing a monetary grant for the purchase of one. Three sites were inspected later the same month including the current site, which was the site of the Government Analysts, and Stock Inspectors offices, at the corners of the Esplanade, Collie, Packenham, and Henry Streets. The site was granted by the Government to the labour bodies of Fremantle for use as a Trades Hall. The ground was also known as the Old Customs House site.

The foundation stone was laid on 26 March 1901 by John Forrest. Also in attendance were F. Gates, the chairman of the building committee and J.J. Cooke, the committee secretary, who presented Forrest with a silver trowel and a jarrah mallet, the former bearing the inscription:

Presented to the Right Hon. Sir John Forrest, P.C., G.C.M.G., D.C.L., M.H.R., Federal Minister of Defence, on the occasion of his laying the foundation stone of the Fremantle Trades Hall, 26th March. 1901. Vivunt dum virent."

The building was opened on 23 January 1904 before a large crowd in a ceremony led by the mayor of North Fremantle, E. Gilleland. The newly elected member for Fremantle, William Carpenter, unveiled both the existing foundation stone and a newly laid stone commemorating the victory of the Labour Party at the last federal election. The building had been constructed at a cost of £2,564, but by the time all extras were paid it would be found that the building would cost closer to £3,000, equivalent to A$528,000 in 2022. It had been built using entirely union labour.

An opening ceremony was held on 4 March 1904 in the form of a smoke social. Over two hundred guests were at the ceremony including the premier, Walter James.

The building was then used as the headquarters for the Fremantle Labour and Trade Union movement, particularly the 50 maritime and other unions associated with the Fremantle Port, until the 1960s. By 1962 the building stood empty and was eventually sold by auction in 1968 for A$21,000, equivalent to A$685,000 in 2022. It was later used as a theatre named the Old Trades Music Hall and in 1974 became a restaurant. The Rajneesh movement acquired the lease in 1981 and opened a restaurant Zorba the Buddha. By 1992 it was being used as a convention centre by the Esplanade Hotel.

The building was purchased by philanthropist Nicola Forrest in 2026 for use as the headquarters for her Coaxial organisation and as a community space.

== See also ==
- List of heritage places in Fremantle
- Perth Trades Hall
