= Coolgardie Miner =

Former newspaper in Coolgardie, Western Australia

- Type: Weekly newspaper
- Founder: William Edward Clare
- Editor: John Drake (1894-)
- Founded: 1894
- Relaunched: 1919, 1935

The Coolgardie Miner (18 April 1894 – 16 June 1911) was a weekly newspaper established in Coolgardie, Western Australia, at a time when Coolgardie was the prominent town in the goldfields region of Western Australia.

The subsequent publication with the same title (1 March 1913 – 29 December 1917) was published in a time when Kalgoorlie was dominating the goldfields, and Coolgardie's decline as centre had set in.

The third newspaper with this name was published in 1935, ceasing in 1957 when it was merged with the Great Eastern News, which ceased publication in 1958.

== History ==
=== Founding ===
The paper was founded by William Edward "Billy" Clare with assistance from Edwin Greenslade Murphy, who, as "Dryblower", contributed a weekly gossip column.

Cartoonist Ben Strange joined the newspaper in 1894.

An early editor was George Williams, previously mining reporter for the Melbourne Argus.

Frederick Vosper was editor some time before April 1895.

Alfred Thomas Chandler was editor from 1896 to 1905.

Don Cameron was printer around 1895 to 1900.

C. A. MacFarlane was editor in 1905.

Harry Kneebone was editor in 1907, and still in the position when publication ceased in 1911.

=== Relaunched 1913 ===
On 1 March 1913 a new newspaper appeared with the same title, the proprietors being named as A. McIntyre and W. L. Michell. It was published weekly on Saturdays and was printed from an office on Bayley Street in Coolgardie.

=== Relaunched 1935 ===
The Coolgardie Miner was relaunched as a weekly newspaper published on Fridays. It was initially printed by United Press. In 1957 it was merged into the Great Eastern News and printed by Country Newspapers in Perth, for distribution to Coolgardie.

== Availability ==
Issues (1894–1917) of this newspaper have been digitised as part of the Australian Newspapers Digitisation Program, a project of the National Library of Australia in cooperation with the State Library of Western Australia.

Hard copy and microfilm copies of the Coolgardie Miner are also available at the State Library of Western Australia.

== See also ==
- Kalgoorlie Miner
- Western Argus
- List of newspapers in Australia
- List of newspapers in Western Australia
