= Minister for Citizenship and Multicultural Interests =

Minister for Citizenship and Multicultural Interests is a position in the government of Western Australia, currently held by Paul Papalia of the Labor Party. The position was first created in 1924, under the name Minister for Immigration, for the first ministry formed by Philip Collier. With the exception of some of the governments of the 1940s and 1950s, it has existed in every government since then. The minister is currently responsible for the state government's Office of Multicultural Interests, which falls within the Department of Local Government and Communities.

== Titles ==
- 16 April 1924 – 25 February 1983: Minister for Immigration
- 25 February 1983 – 11 August 1998: Minister for Multicultural and Ethnic Affairs
- 11 August 1998 – present: Minister for Citizenship and Multicultural Interests

== List of ministers ==
Term start	Term end	Minister	Party
16 April 1924	30 April 1927	William Angwin	Labor
30 April 1927	23 April 1930	Frank Troy	Labor
24 April 1930	24 April 1933	Charles Latham	Country
24 April 1933	15 March 1939	Frank Troy (again)	Labor
1939–1949: no minister – responsibilities held by other ministers
7 October 1949	23 February 1953	Lindsay Thorn	Country
1953–1959: no minister – responsibilities held by other ministers
2 April 1959	3 March 1971	Stewart Bovell	Liberal
3 March 1971	7 February 1973	David Evans	Labor
7 February 1973	30 May 1973	Don Taylor	Labor
30 May 1973	8 April 1974	John Harman	Labor
8 April 1974	21 July 1978	Bill Grayden	Liberal
7 August 1978	25 January 1982	Ray O'Connor	Liberal
25 January 1982	25 February 1983	Gordon Masters	Liberal
25 February 1983	25 February 1986	Ron Davies	Labor
25 February 1986	25 July 1986	Kay Hallahan	Labor
25 July 1986	19 February 1990	Gordon Hill	Labor
19 February 1990	5 February 1991	Carmen Lawrence	Labor
5 February 1991	16 February 1993	Judyth Watson	Labor
16 February 1993	10 February 1995	Graham Kierath	Liberal
10 February 1995	9 January 1997	Paul Omodei	Liberal
9 January 1997	22 December 1999	Mike Board	Liberal
22 December 1999	16 February 2001	Rob Johnson	Liberal
16 February 2001	10 March 2005	Geoff Gallop	Labor
10 March 2005	13 October 2005	Bob Kucera	Labor
13 October 2005	25 November 2005	Mark McGowan	Labor
25 November 2005	26 May 2006	Margaret Quirk	Labor
26 May 2006	13 December 2006	Tony McRae	Labor
13 December 2006	23 September 2008	Ljiljanna Ravlich	Labor
23 September 2008	21 March 2013	John Castrilli	Liberal
21 March 2013	17 March 2017	Mike Nahan	Liberal
17 March 2017	19 March 2021	Paul Papalia	Labor
19 March 2021		Tony Buti	Labor

== See also ==
- Minister for Tourism (Western Australia)
