= Sidney Edwin Hocking =

Journalist and newspaper owner in Western Australia

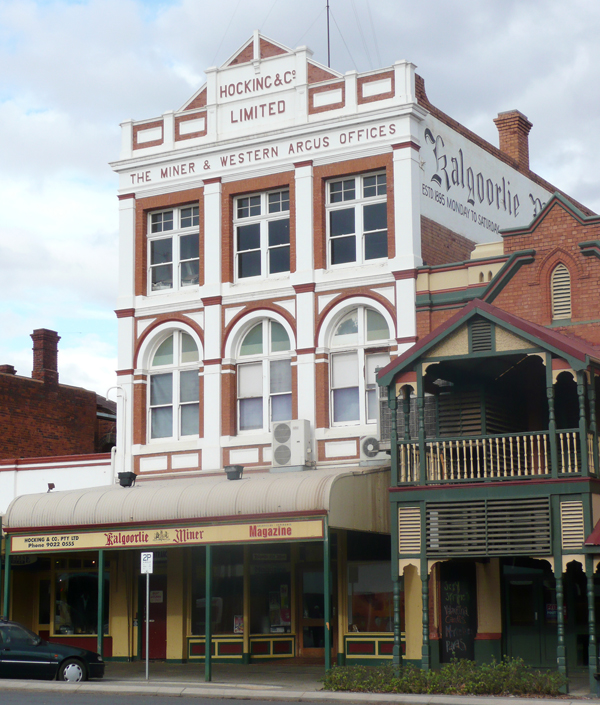
The Kalgoorlie Miner building in Hannan Street.

Sidney Edwin Hocking (1859–1935) founded The Kalgoorlie Miner newspaper in Kalgoorlie, Western Australia, in 1895.

Born in South Australia, he began his career at The Adelaide Advertiser in 1874 as a general reporter. He began reporting on new mines in South Australia, then travelled to others in New South Wales and Western Australia.

When the Kalgoorlie mines began to predominate he moved from Coolgardie and bought the weekly newspaper Kalgoorlie Western Argus, later launching the daily Kalgoorlie Miner. In 1900 he married 21-year-old Effie Fenn and they had eight children.

== Career ==
Hocking had a reputation as a good boss in Kalgoorlie, which no doubt contributed to his election as a councillor and later mayor of the Municipality of Kalgoorlie. He was involved in the Kalgoorlie Racing Club and Chamber of Commerce, and president of the Fresh Air League which sent goldfields children to the coast for holidays.

The company he formed in 1896, Hocking & Co. Pty. Ltd., still publishes The Miner, as it is locally known, to this day. Along with The West Australian, it is the only other daily print newspaper in Western Australia. Following his death in 1935, the running of the newspaper was taken over by his four sons, which continued until 1970. The newspaper's 100-year history was commemorated in 1995 by the publication of The Voice of the Goldfields: 100 Years of the Kalgoorlie Miner by Norma King.
