= Thomas Wilding =

Australian politician

The Honourable Thomas Wilding

Member of the Legislative Council of Western Australia
- In office 22 May 1908 – 21 May 1914
- Preceded by: William Loton
- Succeeded by: Charles Baxter
- Constituency: East Province

Personal details
- Born: 16 March 1867 Northam, Western Australia, Australia
- Died: 18 July 1954 (aged 87) Northam, Western Australia, Australia

Thomas Henry Wilding (16 March 1867 – 18 July 1954) was an Australian politician who was a member of the Legislative Council of Western Australia from 1908 to 1914, representing East Province.

Wilding was born in Northam, Western Australia, to Rose Ann (née Gaffney) and Thomas Wilding. He inherited his father's property at Mokine (near Clackline), where he bred lambs, Clydesdale horses, Jersey cows, and Berkshire pigs. Prominent in local agricultural circles, Wilding first stood for parliament at the 1907 Legislative Council by-election in East Province. He was defeated by George Throssell (a former premier), but stood again at the main election the following year and was elected in place of the retiring William Loton. Wilding left parliament at the expiration of his six-year term in 1914. Outside of politics, he served as president of the Royal Agricultural Society of Western Australia from 1909 to 1928. Wilding died in Northam in 1954, aged 87. He had married Elizabeth Elena Christie in 1918, with whom he had three daughters.
