= Kalgoorlie Miner =

Newspaper based in Kalgoorlie, Western Australia

- Type: Daily newspaper
- Owner(s): Hocking & Co. Pty Ltd (Seven West Media)
- Founder: Sidney Hocking
- Founded: 1895
- Language: English
- Headquarters: Kalgoorlie, Western Australia
- ISSN: 1322-6681
- Website: www.kalminer.com.au

The Kalgoorlie Miner (commonly known as The Miner) is a daily newspaper circulating in the City of Kalgoorlie–Boulder and the Goldfields–Esperance region, in Western Australia.

It is published Monday to Saturday by Hocking & Co. Pty Ltd in Kalgoorlie and printed by Colourpress Pty Ltd in East Victoria Park. The West Australian and The Kalgoorlie Miner are the only two newspapers in Western Australia produced daily. It is also part of the West Regional network.

== History ==
The Kalgoorlie Miner was founded by Sidney Edwin Hocking in September 1895.

In 1896, Hocking launched Hocking & Co. Ltd with himself, brothers Percy and Ernest Hocking, J. W. Kirwan and their printer W. W. Willcock as shareholders.

By 1898, The Kalgoorlie Miner had become a harsh critic of the Western Australian Government, led by John Forrest. The newspaper contended that the government discriminated against the goldfields population by inadequate parliamentary representation and in other ways. An action for an alleged breach of parliamentary privilege brought against The Kalgoorlie Miner failed and criticism of the government continued unabated.

Following the death of Sidney Hocking in 1935 the running of The Kalgoorlie Miner was taken over by his four sons, Sidney, Ernest, Percy and Joe. In April 1970, the ownership passed from the hands of the Hocking family to West Australian Newspapers Pty Ltd.

The newspaper was printed in Kalgoorlie until 1976, when press operations were transferred to Perth.

A book on the newspaper's history was published to mark its centenary in 1995: The Voice of the Goldfields: 100 Years of the Kalgoorlie Miner, by Norma King.

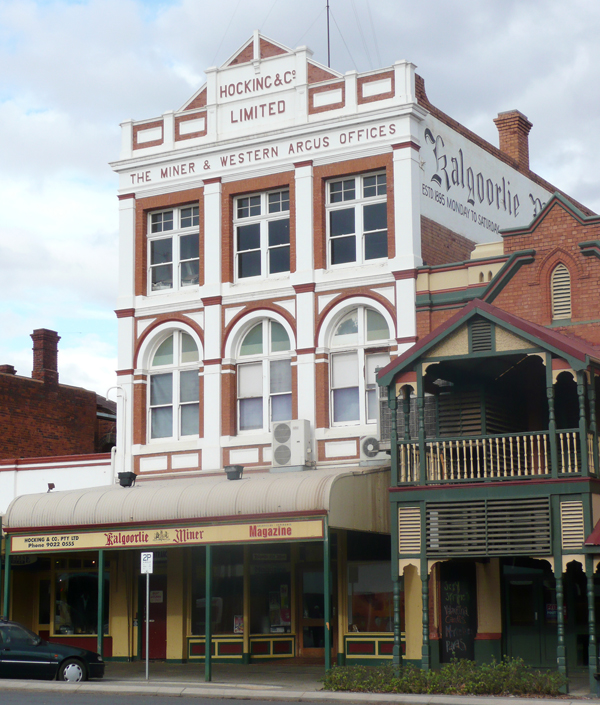
The Kalgoorlie Miner building in Hannan Street.

== The building ==
The Kalgoorlie Miner building, constructed in 1900, is the only three-storey structure in Kalgoorlie's main street, Hannan Street. The sign at the top of the building facade still has the title Hocking & Co. / The Miner and Western Argus offices reflecting on the era when the Kalgoorlie Miner and the Western Argus were being published. The building is representative of the ebullient architecture that was common in Kalgoorlie during the gold boom. It is a demonstration of the increasing prosperity and sophistication of Kalgoorlie, and Western Australia, at the beginning of the 20th century.

== Circulation ==
Daily circulation in 2009 was 5,721 copies Monday to Friday and 10,800 on Saturday.

== See also ==
- Coolgardie Miner
