= Western Argus =

Former newspaper published in Kalgoorlie, Western Australia

- Founded: 1894
- Ceased publication: 1938
- Language: English
- Headquarters: Kalgoorlie, Western Australia

The Western Argus was a newspaper published in Kalgoorlie, Western Australia, between 1894 and 1938.

It had three different names over time:

- Western Argus, 1894-1896
- Kalgoorlie Western Argus, 1896-1916
- Western Argus, 1916-1938

It was brought by Hocking & Co. Ltd. in 1896.

It was a weekly and had offices in the same building as the Kalgoorlie Miner on Hannan Street. It was promoted in the Kalgoorlie Miner as well.

== See also ==
- Coolgardie Miner
