= Electoral results for the district of Roebourne =

Western Australian district election results

This is a list of electoral results for the Electoral district of Roebourne in Western Australian state elections.

== Members for Roebourne ==
Member	Party	Term
George Leake	Non-aligned	1890
Horace Sholl	Ministerial	1891–1901
John Sydney Hicks	Ministerial	1901–1908
Henry Osborn	Ministerial	1908–1911
Joseph Gardiner	Labor	1911–1915
William Butcher	Liberal	1915–1917
William Butcher	Nationalist	1917
Frederick Teesdale	Nationalist	1917–1932
John Church	Nationalist	1932–1933
Aloysius Rodoreda	Labor	1933–1950

== Election results ==
=== Elections in the 1940s ===
1947 Western Australian state election: Roebourne
Party	Candidate	Votes	%	±%
Labor	Alec Rodoreda	unopposed		
Labor hold		Swing		

1943 Western Australian state election: Roebourne
Party	Candidate	Votes	%	±%
Labor	Alec Rodoreda	221	69.5	+7.4
Country	George Monger	97	30.5	+30.5
Total formal votes		318	98.8	−0.8
Informal votes		4	1.2	+0.8
Turnout		322	65.5	−19.3
Labor hold		Swing	+7.4	

=== Elections in the 1930s ===
1939 Western Australian state election: Roebourne
Party	Candidate	Votes	%	±%
Labor	Alec Rodoreda	355	62.1	−37.9
Nationalist	Alexander Angelo	217	37.9	+37.9
Total formal votes		572	99.6	
Informal votes		2	0.4	
Turnout		574	84.8	
Labor hold		Swing	N/A	

1936 Western Australian state election: Roebourne
Party	Candidate	Votes	%	±%
Labor	Alec Rodoreda	unopposed		
Labor hold		Swing		

1933 Western Australian state election: Roebourne
Party	Candidate	Votes	%	±%
Labor	Alec Rodoreda	261	52.3	+22.4
Nationalist	John Church	238	47.7	−22.4
Total formal votes		499	98.6	−1.0
Informal votes		7	1.4	+1.0
Turnout		506	86.4	+12.2
Labor gain from Nationalist		Swing	+22.4	

1932 Roebourne state by-election
Party	Candidate	Votes	%	±%
Nationalist	John Church	108	28.9	n/a
Labor	John Archer	68	18.2	–11.7
Independent	Harold Cornish	61	16.3	+16.3
Independent	Ernest Foulkes-Taylor	54	14.4	+14.4
Nationalist	Richard Sleeman	50	13.4	n/a
Country	Charles Ferguson	33	8.8	+8.8
Total formal votes		374	96.9	–2.7
Informal votes		12	3.1	+2.7
Turnout		386	83.9	+9.7
Two-candidate-preferred result
Nationalist	John Church	211	56.4	–13.7
Independent	Harold Cornish	163	43.5	+43.6
Nationalist hold		Swing	N/A	

1930 Western Australian state election: Roebourne
Party	Candidate	Votes	%	±%
Nationalist	Frederick Teesdale	317	70.1	
Labor	Arthur Orr	135	29.9	
Total formal votes		452	99.6	
Informal votes		2	0.4	
Turnout		454	74.2	
Nationalist hold		Swing		

=== Elections in the 1920s ===
1927 Western Australian state election: Roebourne
Party	Candidate	Votes	%	±%
Nationalist	Frederick Teesdale	252	57.8	−42.2
Labor	Thomas McCarthy	184	42.2	+42.2
Total formal votes		436	99.8	
Informal votes		1	0.2	
Turnout		437	66.2	
Nationalist hold		Swing	N/A	

1924 Western Australian state election: Roebourne
Party	Candidate	Votes	%	±%
Nationalist	Frederick Teesdale	unopposed		
Nationalist hold		Swing		

1921 Western Australian state election: Roebourne
Party	Candidate	Votes	%	±%
Nationalist	Frederick Teesdale	246	74.8	−3.1
Labor	Thomas Daley	47	14.3	−7.8
Independent	Richard Hancock	36	10.9	+10.9
Total formal votes		329	98.5	−1.2
Informal votes		5	1.5	+1.2
Turnout		334	57.6	+8.9
Nationalist hold		Swing	N/A	

- Preferences were not distributed.

=== Elections in the 1910s ===
1917 Western Australian state election: Roebourne
Party	Candidate	Votes	%	±%
Nationalist	Frederick Teesdale	271	77.9	+77.9
Labor	John Haughey	77	22.1	–25.1
Total formal votes		348	99.7	+1.4
Informal votes		1	0.3	–1.4
Turnout		349	48.7	n/a
Nationalist hold		Swing	N/A	

1915 Roebourne state by-election
Party	Candidate	Votes	%	±%
Liberal	William Butcher	254	53.8	+8.2
Labor	William Waugh	218	46.2	−8.2
Total formal votes		472	98.3	+0.8
Informal votes		8	1.7	−0.8
Turnout		480	N/A	
Liberal gain from Labor		Swing	+8.2	

1914 Western Australian state election: Roebourne
Party	Candidate	Votes	%	±%
Labor	Joseph Gardiner	324	54.4	−11.9
Liberal	Frederick Teesdale	272	45.6	+28.6
Total formal votes		596	97.5	+1.7
Informal votes		15	2.5	−1.7
Turnout		611	54.1	−0.4
Labor hold		Swing	N/A	

1911 Western Australian state election: Roebourne
Party	Candidate	Votes	%	±%
Labor	Joseph Gardiner	379	66.3	
Ministerialist	Albert Wilson	97	17.0	
Ministerialist	Henry Osborn	96	16.8	
Total formal votes		572	95.8	
Informal votes		25	4.2	
Turnout		597	54.5	
Labor gain from Ministerialist		Swing		

- Preferences were not distributed.

=== Elections in the 1900s ===
1908 Western Australian state election: Roebourne
Party	Candidate	Votes	%	±%
Ministerialist	Henry Osborn	185	52.7	−47.3
Ministerialist	Albert Wilson	145	41.3	+41.3
Ministerialist	William Withnell	21	6.0	+6.0
Total formal votes		351	93.6	
Informal votes		24	6.4	
Turnout		375	48.1	
Ministerialist hold		Swing	N/A	

1905 Western Australian state election: Roebourne
Party	Candidate	Votes	%	±%
Ministerialist	John Sydney Hicks	unopposed		
Ministerialist hold		Swing		

1904 Western Australian state election: Roebourne
Party	Candidate	Votes	%	±%
Ministerialist	John Sydney Hicks	unopposed		
Ministerialist hold		Swing		

1901 Western Australian state election: Roebourne
Party	Candidate	Votes	%	±%
Independent	John Sydney Hicks	unopposed		
Independent hold		Swing		

=== Elections in the 1890s ===
1897 Western Australian colonial election: Roebourne
Party	Candidate	Votes	%	±%
Ministerialist	Horace Sholl	unopposed		
Ministerialist hold		Swing		

1894 Western Australian colonial election: Roebourne
Party	Candidate	Votes	%	±%
None	Horace Sholl	unopposed		

1891 Roebourne colonial by-election
Party	Candidate	Votes	%	±%
None	Horace Sholl	unopposed		

1890 Western Australian colonial election: Roebourne
Party	Candidate	Votes	%	±%
None	George Leake	unopposed		
