= Electoral results for the district of Gascoyne =

Western Australian district election results

This is a list of electoral results for the Electoral district of Gascoyne in Western Australian state elections.

== Members for Gascoyne ==
Member	Party	Term
Robert Frederick Sholl	Opposition	1890–1897
George Hubble	Ministerial	1897–1901
William Butcher	Independent	1901–1905
William Butcher	Ministerial	1905–1911
John McDonald	Labor	1911–1914
Archibald Gilchrist	Liberal (WA)	1914–1917
Edward Angelo	Nationalist	1917–1920
Edward Angelo	Country	1920–1923
Edward Angelo	Country (MCP)	1923–1924
Edward Angelo	Nationalist	1924–1933
Frank Wise	Labor	1933–1951
Noel Butcher	Independent Liberal	1951–1953
Daniel Norton	Labor	1953–1974
Ian Laurance	Liberal	1974–1987
Dudley Maslen	Liberal	1987–1989

== Election results ==
=== Elections in the 1980s ===
1987 Gascoyne state by-election
Party	Candidate	Votes	%	±%
Liberal	Dudley Maslen	2,165	53.0	−7.5
Labor	Kevin Leahy	1,919	47.0	+7.5
Total formal votes		4,084	98.2	+0.4
Informal votes		73	1.8	−0.4
Turnout		4,157	81.6	−4.3
Liberal hold		Swing	−7.5	

1986 Western Australian state election: Gascoyne
Party	Candidate	Votes	%	±%
Liberal	Ian Laurance	2,600	60.5	−1.3
Labor	Kevin Leahy	1,697	39.5	+1.3
Total formal votes		4,297	97.8	+0.5
Informal votes		96	2.2	−0.5
Turnout		4,393	85.9	+1.3
Liberal hold		Swing	−1.3	

1983 Western Australian state election: Gascoyne
Party	Candidate	Votes	%	±%
Liberal	Ian Laurance	2,026	61.8	
Labor	John Cunningham	1,253	38.2	
Total formal votes		3,279	97.3	
Informal votes		91	2.7	
Turnout		3,370	84.6	
Liberal hold		Swing		

1980 Western Australian state election: Gascoyne
Party	Candidate	Votes	%	±%
Liberal	Ian Laurance	2,015	61.6	−7.9
Labor	Robert Price	1,183	36.1	+9.6
Independent	Robert Phillips	75	2.3	−1.7
Total formal votes		3,273	97.2	+0.1
Informal votes		95	2.8	−0.1
Turnout		3,368	87.7	−1.7
Two-party-preferred result
Liberal	Ian Laurance	2,052	62.7	−8.9
Labor	Robert Price	1,221	37.3	+8.9
Liberal hold		Swing	−8.9	

=== Elections in the 1970s ===
1977 Western Australian state election: Gascoyne
Party	Candidate	Votes	%	±%
Liberal	Ian Laurance	2,192	69.5	
Labor	Robert Brown	834	26.5	
Independent	Robert Phillips	127	4.0	
Total formal votes		3,153	97.1	
Informal votes		95	2.9	
Turnout		3,248	89.4	
Two-party-preferred result
Liberal	Ian Laurance	2,256	71.6	+6.2
Labor	Robert Brown	897	28.4	−6.2
Liberal hold		Swing	+6.2	

1974 Western Australian state election: Gascoyne
Party	Candidate	Votes	%	±%
Liberal	Ian Laurance	1,610	50.5	
Labor	Frank Davis	955	30.0	
National Alliance	Wilson Tuckey	511	16.0	
Independent	Robert Phillips	111	3.5	
Total formal votes		3,187	95.3	
Informal votes		156	4.7	
Turnout		3,343	88.0	
Two-party-preferred result
Liberal	Ian Laurance	2,100	65.9	
Labor	Frank Davis	1,087	34.1	
Liberal gain from Labor		Swing		

1971 Western Australian state election: Gascoyne
Party	Candidate	Votes	%	±%
Labor	Daniel Norton	1,546	58.1	−4.1
Liberal	Keith Hasleby	839	31.5	−2.6
Independent	Robert Phillips	167	6.3	+6.3
Democratic Labor	Kevin Courtney	110	4.1	+4.1
Total formal votes		2,662	96.1	−1.3
Informal votes		109	3.9	+1.3
Turnout		2,771	84.4	−0.3
Two-party-preferred result
Labor	Daniel Norton	1,645	61.8	−2.3
Liberal	Keith Hasleby	1,017	38.2	+2.3
Labor hold		Swing	−2.3	

=== Elections in the 1960s ===
1968 Western Australian state election: Gascoyne
Party	Candidate	Votes	%	±%
Labor	Daniel Norton	1,321	62.2	
Liberal and Country	Peter Butler	724	34.1	
Independent	Neville Brandstater	79	3.7	
Total formal votes		2,124	97.4	
Informal votes		56	2.6	
Turnout		2,180	84.7	
Two-party-preferred result
Labor	Daniel Norton	1,361	64.1	
Liberal and Country	Peter Butler	763	35.9	
Labor hold		Swing		

1965 Western Australian state election: Gascoyne
Party	Candidate	Votes	%	±%
Labor	Daniel Norton	1,064	62.5	−37.5
Liberal and Country	Stewart Maver	556	32.7	+32.7
Independent	Neville Brandstater	82	4.8	+4.8
Total formal votes		1,702	97.5	
Informal votes		43	2.5	
Turnout		1,745	85.2	
Two-party-preferred result
Labor	Daniel Norton	1,106	65.8	−2.2
Liberal and Country	Stewart Maver	596	34.2	+2.2
Labor hold		Swing	−2.2	

1962 Western Australian state election: Gascoyne
Party	Candidate	Votes	%	±%
Labor	Daniel Norton	unopposed		
Labor hold		Swing		

=== Elections in the 1950s ===
1959 Western Australian state election: Gascoyne
Party	Candidate	Votes	%	±%
Labor	Daniel Norton	1,080	70.8	+1.1
Liberal and Country	Thomas Orr	446	29.2	−1.1
Total formal votes		1,526	98.8	+1.0
Informal votes		19	1.2	−1.0
Turnout		1,545	87.1	+2.7
Labor hold		Swing	+1.1	

1956 Western Australian state election: Gascoyne
Party	Candidate	Votes	%	±%
Labor	Daniel Norton	1,068	69.7	
Liberal and Country	Kenneth Illingworth	465	30.3	
Total formal votes		1,533	97.8	
Informal votes		35	2.2	
Turnout		1,568	84.4	
Labor hold		Swing		

1953 Western Australian state election: Gascoyne
Party	Candidate	Votes	%	±%
Labor	Daniel Norton	726	50.4	−26.1
Independent Liberal	Noel Butcher	519	36.0	+36.0
Liberal and Country	Robert Iles	116	8.1	−15.4
Total formal votes		1,440	96.3	−0.9
Informal votes		55	3.7	+0.9
Turnout		1,495	90.2	+4.4
Labor hold		Swing	N/A	

- Preferences were not distributed.
- Gascoyne had been won by the Independent Liberal candidate in the 1951 by-election.

1951 Gascoyne state by-election
Party	Candidate	Votes	%	±%
Labor	Daniel Norton	537	45.7	−30.8
Independent Liberal	Noel Butcher	356	30.3	+30.3
Liberal and Country	John Dempster	256	21.8	−1.7
All Parties Administration	Carlyle Ferguson	27	2.3	+2.3
Total formal votes		1,176	98.9	+1.7
Informal votes		13	1.1	−1.7
Turnout		1,189	87.6	+1.8
Two-candidate-preferred result
Independent Liberal	Noel Butcher	603	51.3	+51.3
Labor	Daniel Norton	573	48.7	−27.8
Independent Liberal gain from Labor		Swing	N/A	

1950 Western Australian state election: Gascoyne
Party	Candidate	Votes	%	±%
Labor	Frank Wise	946	76.5	
Liberal and Country	Noel Butcher	290	23.5	
Total formal votes		1,236	97.2	
Informal votes		35	2.8	
Turnout		1,271	85.8	
Labor hold		Swing		

=== Elections in the 1940s ===
1947 Western Australian state election: Gascoyne
Party	Candidate	Votes	%	±%
Labor	Frank Wise	unopposed		
Labor hold		Swing		

1943 Western Australian state election: Gascoyne
Party	Candidate	Votes	%	±%
Labor	Frank Wise	unopposed		
Labor hold		Swing		

=== Elections in the 1930s ===
1939 Western Australian state election: Gascoyne
Party	Candidate	Votes	%	±%
Labor	Frank Wise	unopposed		
Labor hold		Swing		

1936 Western Australian state election: Gascoyne
Party	Candidate	Votes	%	±%
Labor	Frank Wise	683	81.4	+19.0
Country	Jack Pericles	156	18.6	+18.6
Total formal votes		839	99.5	+0.4
Informal votes		4	0.5	−0.4
Turnout		843	71.5	−11.9
Labor hold		Swing	+19.0	

1933 Western Australian state election: Gascoyne
Party	Candidate	Votes	%	±%
Labor	Frank Wise	610	62.4	+17.7
Nationalist	Edward Angelo	368	37.6	−17.7
Total formal votes		969	99.1	−0.1
Informal votes		9	0.9	+0.1
Turnout		987	83.4	+0.9
Labor gain from Nationalist		Swing	+17.7	

1930 Western Australian state election: Gascoyne
Party	Candidate	Votes	%	±%
Nationalist	Edward Angelo	639	55.3	
Labor	James Hickey	517	44.7	
Total formal votes		1,156	99.2	
Informal votes		9	0.8	
Turnout		1,165	82.5	
Nationalist hold		Swing		

=== Elections in the 1920s ===
1927 Western Australian state election: Gascoyne
Party	Candidate	Votes	%	±%
Nationalist	Edward Angelo	613	58.8	+3.2
Labor	William Willesee	430	41.2	−3.2
Total formal votes		1,043	98.7	−0.6
Informal votes		14	1.3	+0.6
Turnout		1,057	76.2	+8.0
Nationalist hold		Swing	+3.2	

1924 Western Australian state election: Gascoyne
Party	Candidate	Votes	%	±%
Country	Edward Angelo	490	55.6	−5.1
Labor	William Willesee	391	44.4	+17.9
Total formal votes		881	99.3	+0.3
Informal votes		6	0.7	−0.3
Turnout		887	68.2	+7.3
Country hold		Swing	N/A	

1921 Western Australian state election: Gascoyne
Party	Candidate	Votes	%	±%
Country	Edward Angelo	412	60.7	+60.7
Labor	George Jones	180	26.5	+26.5
Independent	Edmund Holden	87	12.8	+12.8
Total formal votes		679	99.0	−1.0
Informal votes		7	1.0	+1.0
Turnout		686	60.9	+7.6
Country gain from Nationalist		Swing	N/A	

=== Elections in the 1910s ===
1917 Western Australian state election: Gascoyne
Party	Candidate	Votes	%	±%
Nationalist	Edward Angelo	313	65.2	+65.2
National Liberal	Archibald Gilchrist	167	34.8	–24.9
Total formal votes		480	100.0	+0.4
Informal votes		0	0.0	–0.4
Turnout		480	53.3	–10.1
Nationalist gain from National Liberal		Swing	+65.2	

- Gilchrist's designation at the 1914 election was simply "Liberal", rather than "National Liberal".

1914 Western Australian state election: Gascoyne
Party	Candidate	Votes	%	±%
Liberal	Archibald Gilchrist	435	59.7	+13.3
Labor	Edward Pearson	294	40.3	−13.3
Total formal votes		729	99.6	+0.2
Informal votes		3	0.4	−0.2
Turnout		732	63.4	+14.9
Liberal gain from Labor		Swing	+13.3	

1911 Western Australian state election: Gascoyne
Party	Candidate	Votes	%	±%
Labor	John McDonald	468	53.6	
Ministerialist	William Butcher	405	46.4	
Total formal votes		873	99.4	
Informal votes		5	0.6	
Turnout		878	48.5	
Labor gain from Ministerialist		Swing		

1910 Gascoyne state by-election
Party	Candidate	Votes	%	±%
Ministerialist	William Butcher	unopposed		
Ministerialist hold		Swing		

=== Elections in the 1900s ===
1908 Western Australian state election: Gascoyne
Party	Candidate	Votes	%	±%
Ministerialist	William Butcher	unopposed		
Ministerialist hold		Swing		

1905 Western Australian state election: Gascoyne
Party	Candidate	Votes	%	±%
Ministerialist	William Butcher	unopposed		
Ministerialist hold		Swing		

1904 Western Australian state election: Gascoyne
Party	Candidate	Votes	%	±%
Independent	William Butcher	unopposed		
Independent hold		Swing		

1901 Western Australian state election: Gascoyne
Party	Candidate	Votes	%	±%
Opposition	William Butcher	126	66.0	+66.0
Ministerialist	David Forrest	65	34.0	–66.0
Total formal votes		191	99.5	n/a
Informal votes		1	0.5	n/a
Turnout		192	47.6	n/a
Opposition gain from Ministerialist		Swing	+66.0	

- George Hubble, the sitting Ministerialist member, had held the seat unopposed in 1897.

=== Elections in the 1890s ===
1899 Gascoyne colonial by-election
Party	Candidate	Votes	%	±%
Ministerialist	George Hubble	unopposed		
Ministerialist hold		Swing		

- This by-election was called because sitting member George Hubble was declared bankrupt, and the law at the time required that he had to resign his seat. However, he won it unopposed in the resulting by-election.

1897 Western Australian colonial election: Gascoyne
Party	Candidate	Votes	%	±%
Ministerialist	George Hubble	unopposed		
Ministerialist hold		Swing		

1894 Western Australian colonial election: Gascoyne
Party	Candidate	Votes	%	±%
None	Robert Sholl	unopposed		

1890 Western Australian colonial election: Gascoyne
Party	Candidate	Votes	%	±%
None	Robert F. Sholl	unopposed		
