= Members of the Western Australian Legislative Assembly, 1930–1933 =

This is a list of members of the Western Australian Legislative Assembly between the 1930 election and the 1933 election, together known as the 14th Parliament. It took place under radically altered boundaries as enacted within the Redistribution of Seats Act 1929, whose effect had been exaggerated by the lack of a redistribution for the previous 18 years. The gold mining areas, populous at the time of the 1911 redistribution, had been reduced to pocket boroughs by the decline in gold mining as an economic activity in the State; meanwhile, the agricultural and metropolitan areas had grown substantially. Ironically, the changes were enacted by a Labor government even though most of the safe seats being abolished were Labor seats—and for the fourth time in a row (Constitution Act Amendment Act 1899, and Redistribution of Seats Acts of 1904, 1911 and 1929), the government enacting the redistribution lost the subsequent election.

Name	Party	District	Years in office
Edward Angelo	Nationalist	Gascoyne	1917–1933
George Barnard	Nationalist	Sussex	1924–1933
Henry Brown	Country	Pingelly	1924–1933
John Church^{[2]}	Nationalist	Roebourne	1932–1933
Philip Collier	Labor	Boulder	1905–1948
Edwin Corboy	Labor	Yilgarn-Coolgardie	1921–1933
Aubrey Coverley	Labor	Kimberley	1924–1953
James Cunningham	Labor	Kalgoorlie	1923–1936
Thomas Davy^{[1]}^{[5]}	Nationalist	West Perth	1924–1933
Victor Doney	Country	Williams-Narrogin	1928–1956
Percy Ferguson^{[1]}	Country	Irwin-Moore	1927–1939
Harry Griffiths	Country	Avon	1914–1921; 1924–1935
James Hegney	Labor	Middle Swan	1930–1947; 1950–1968
May Holman	Labor	Forrest	1925–1939
William Johnson	Labor	Guildford-Midland	1901–1905; 1906–1917; 1924–1948
Norbert Keenan^{[1]}	Nationalist	Nedlands	1904–1911; 1930–1950
James Kenneally	Labor	East Perth	1927–1936
Alfred Lamond	Labor	Pilbara	1924–1933
Charles Latham^{[1]}	Country	York	1921–1942
John Lindsay^{[1]}	Country	Mount Marshall	1924–1933
John Lutey^{[4]}	Labor	Brownhill-Ivanhoe	1916; 1917–1932
Alick McCallum	Labor	South Fremantle	1921–1935
Ross McLarty	Nationalist	Murray-Wellington	1930–1962
Harry Mann	Nationalist	Perth	1921–1933
James Mann	Country	Beverley	1930–1962
William Marshall	Labor	Murchison	1921–1952
Harry Millington	Labor	Mount Hawthorn	1924–1947
Hon Sir James Mitchell^{[1]}	Nationalist	Northam	1905–1933
Selby Munsie	Labor	Hannans	1911–1938
Charles North	Nationalist	Claremont	1924–1956
Emil Nulsen^{[3]}	Labor	Kanowna	1932–1962
Alexander Panton	Labor	Leederville	1924–1951
Hubert Parker	Nationalist	North-East Fremantle	1930–1933
William Patrick	Country	Greenough	1930–1943
Arnold Piesse	Independent/Country	Katanning	1909–1914; 1930–1935
Howard Raphael	Labor	Victoria Park	1930–1944
Walter Richardson	Nationalist	Subiaco	1921–1933
Richard Sampson	Nationalist/Country	Swan	1921–1944
John Scaddan^{[1]}	Nationalist	Maylands	1904–1917; 1919–1924; 1930–1933
Joseph Sleeman	Labor	Fremantle	1924–1959
Frederick Smith^{[4]}	Labor	Brown Hill-Ivanhoe	1932–1950
James MacCallum Smith	Nationalist	North Perth	1914–1939
John Henry Smith	Nationalist	Nelson	1921–1936; 1939–1943
Sydney Stubbs	Country	Wagin	1911–1947
Frederick Teesdale^{[2]}	Nationalist	Roebourne	1917–1931
Lindsay Thorn	Country	Toodyay	1930–1959
Michael Troy	Labor	Mount Magnet	1904–1939
Thomas Walker^{[3]}	Labor	Kanowna	1905–1932
Arthur Wansbrough	Labor	Albany	1924–1936
Herbert Wells	Nationalist	Canning	1930–1933
John Willcock	Labor	Geraldton	1917–1947
Arthur Wilson	Labor	Collie	1908–1947
Frederick Withers	Labor	Bunbury	1924–1947

== Notes ==
^{1} Following the 1930 state election a new Ministry consisting of seven members, including one Member of the Legislative Council, was appointed on 24 April 1930. These members were therefore required to resign and contest ministerial by-elections on 1 May 1930, at which all were returned unopposed.
^{2} On 14 December 1931, the Nationalist member for Roebourne, Frederick Teesdale, died. Nationalist candidate John Church won the resulting by-election held on 6 February 1932.
^{3} On 10 May 1932, the Labor member for Kanowna, Thomas Walker. Labor candidate Emil Nulsen won the resulting by-election held on 25 June 1932.
^{4} On 22 June 1932, the Labor member for Brownhill-Ivanhoe, John Lutey, died. Labor candidate Frederick Smith was elected unopposed on 14 July 1932.
^{5} On 18 February 1933, Nationalist member and Minister Thomas Davy died suddenly while playing bridge with his wife and two friends at the Savoy Hotel. A by-election was not held due to the proximity of the 1933 state election.

== Sources ==
- Black, David; Prescott, Valerie (1997). Election statistics, Legislative Assembly of Western Australia, 1890-1996. Perth: Parliamentary History Project. ISBN 0-7309-8409-5.
- Hughes, Colin A.; Graham, B. D. (1976). Voting for the South Australian, Western Australian and Tasmanian Lower Houses, 1890-1964. Canberra: Australian National University. ISBN 0-7081-1334-6.
