= Swainsona thompsoniana =

Scientific classification
- Kingdom: Plantae
- Clade: Tracheophytes
- Clade: Angiosperms
- Clade: Eudicots
- Clade: Rosids
- Order: Fabales
- Family: Fabaceae
- Subfamily: Faboideae
- Genus: Swainsona
- Species: S. thompsoniana

Binomial name
- Swainsona thompsoniana R.W.Davis & P.J.H.Hurter

Species of flowering plant

Swainsona thompsoniana is a species of flowering plant in the family Fabaceae and is endemic to inland northern Western Australia. It is a prostrate annual herb, with imparipinnate leaves with 3 to 6 pairs of narrowly egg-shaped to egg-shaped leaflets with the narrower end towards the base, and racemes of up to 3 mauve and cream-coloured to yellow flowers.

== Description ==
Swainsona thompsoniana is an erect, annual herb with imparipinnate leaves up to 15–20 mm (0.59–0.79 in) long with 3 to 6 pairs of narrowly egg-shaped to egg-shaped leaflets, the leaflets mostly 4–13 mm (0.16–0.51 in) long and 2–4 mm (0.079–0.157 in) wide. There is a stipule about 2.0–2.2 mm (0.079–0.087 in) long at the base of the petiole. The flowers are arranged in racemes 20–60 mm (0.79–2.36 in) long with up to 3 flowers on a peduncle 0.20–0.25 mm (0.0079–0.0098 in) wide, each flower 5–7 mm (0.20–0.28 in) long on a pedicel about 2–4 mm (0.079–0.157 in) long. The sepals are joined at the base, forming a tube 1.0–1.4 mm (0.039–0.055 in) long, the sepal lobes 2.0–2.5 mm (0.079–0.098 in) long. The petals are mauve with a cream-coloured to yellow centre, the standard petal about 5.7–6.6 mm (0.22–0.26 in) long and 5.0–5.5 mm (0.20–0.22 in) wide, the wings 4.8–5.2 mm (0.19–0.20 in) long, and the keel 6.5–7 mm (0.26–0.28 in) long and 2.4–2.6 mm (0.094–0.102 in) deep. The fruit is 38–60 mm (1.5–2.4 in) long and 5–6 mm (0.20–0.24 in) wide.

== Taxonomy ==
Swainsona thompsoniana was first formally described in 2013 by R.W.Davis and P.J.H. Hurter in the journal Nuytsia from specimens collected on Hamersley Station. The specific epithet (thompsoniana) honours Joy Thompson "in recognition of her contribution to the taxonomy of Swainsona".

== Distribution and habitat ==
This species of pea grows on open flood plains between Pannawonica, Mount Florence Station, Tom Price and Wittenoom in the inland of northern Western Australia.

== Conservation status ==
Swainsona thompsoniana is listed as "Priority Three" by the Government of Western Australia Department of Biodiversity, Conservation and Attractions, meaning that it is poorly known and known from only a few locations but is not under imminent threat.
