= Edward Fox Angelo =

Australian soldier (1836–1902)

Edward Fox Angelo (1836 – 1902) was a soldier holding various positions in the colonies of Australia and elsewhere. From 1882 to 1886, Fox was commandant of the military forces of the Colony of Western Australia.

== Military and government career ==
Fox served with the 28th and 1st Regiments of the British Army in the Crimean War and in India from 1854 to 1878. He retired as lieutenant–colonel to become commandant of the Tasmanian colonial forces from 1880 to 1882. Fox served as Commandant of the Western Australian Defence Force from 1882 to 1886. He then resigned to become government resident at Roebourne (1886) and Bunbury (1889), before ending his career as superintendent of the Australian Aboriginal prison at Rottnest Island (1890–97).

== Personal life ==
Fox was married to Mary Colquhoun, née Fraser. Fox had one son, politician Edward Houghton Angelo (1870–1948).
