= Rodoreda =

Rodoreda is a surname of Catalan origin. Notable people with the surname include:

- Aloysius Rodoreda (1892–1958), Australian politician
- Mercè Rodoreda (1908–1983), Spanish novelist
