= John Church (politician) =

Australian politician

Member of the Legislative Assembly of Western Australia
- In office 6 February 1932 – 8 April 1933
- Preceded by: Frederick Teesdale
- Succeeded by: Aloysius Rodoreda
- Constituency: Roebourne

Personal details
- Born: 8 April 1859 Braintree, Essex, England
- Died: 7 August 1937 (aged 78) West Perth, Western Australia, Australia
- Party: Nationalist

John Henry Church (8 April 1859 – 7 August 1937) was an Australian pastoralist and politician who was a Nationalist member of the Legislative Assembly of Western Australia from 1932 to 1933, representing the seat of Roebourne.

== Early life and assault case ==
Church was born in Braintree, Essex, England. He arrived in Western Australia in 1883, and lived in Perth until 1889, when he went to the North West. Church worked for a period as a jackaroo, including at Chirritta and Hamersley Stations, and was also involved in the emerging pearling and mining industries. In 1898, he acquired the lease on Woodbrook Station, near Roebourne. Early the following year, Church was convicted of assaulting one of his Aboriginal employees with a stockwhip, and fined one shilling by the local magistrate. His defence had been that he had acted in self-defence. At the same time, his employee, who had been working for Church as a shepherd, was found guilty of neglecting his duties (resulting in the loss of some of Church's sheep), and sentenced to two months' imprisonment with hard labour. The matter received attention from a number of Perth newspapers, with The Sunday Times describing it as a "travesty of justice". The case was also reported in Sydney, with The Evening News remarking unfavourably upon the sentences given.

== Later life and politics ==
In 1903, Church acquired the lease on Mount Florence Station, near Wittenoom, which he would maintain until his death. In 1918, he and three brothers (Thomas, Percy, and Arthur Stove) sublet Cooya Pooya Station, under the name of the Harding River Pastoral Company. They acquired the full lease in 1925, and later also took up Daniels Well Station, near Roebourne. The syndicate was disbanded in 1939, with Church receiving Daniels Well and the Stove brothers received Cooya Pooya. Church was involved in the Pastoralists and Graziers Association of Western Australian from its inception in 1907, and served as its president for a period. Outside of his pastoral interests, he was also a director of a meat export firm.

Beginning in the early 1900s, Church served several terms on the Tableland Roads Board (now part of the Shire of Ashburton). His name had been mentioned in connection with state-level politics as early as 1903, when he considered nominating for the 1903 Pilbara by-election. In December 1931, the Nationalist MP for Roebourne, Frederick Teesdale, died in office. The resulting by-election, held a few months later, was considered to be of great importance to the government of Sir James Mitchell, as a loss would reduce it to minority government. Church was nominated as one of two candidates for the Nationalist Party, and went on to win with 56.4 percent of the two-candidate-preferred vote (against an independent candidate, Harold Cornish). Aged 72 at the time of his election, he became (and as of 2016 remains) the oldest person to be elected to the Legislative Assembly for the first time. However, Church's time in parliament was short-lived, as he was defeated by Labor's Aloysius Rodoreda at the 1933 state election.

Church retired to Perth, dying there in August 1937, aged 78. He had married Blanche Eveline Single in 1901, with whom he had one daughter.

== See also ==
- Members of the Western Australian Legislative Assembly, 1930–1933

Parliament of Western Australia
Preceded by Frederick Teesdale	Member for Roebourne; 1932–1933	Succeeded by Aloysius Rodoreda
