= 1932 Roebourne state by-election =

A by-election for the seat of Roebourne in the Legislative Assembly of Western Australia was held on 6 February 1932. It was triggered by the death of Frederick Teesdale (the sitting Nationalist member) on 14 December 1931.

The election was considered to be of great importance to the government of Sir James Mitchell, as a loss to the Labor Party would reduce his Nationalist–Country coalition to minority government. John Church, a 72-year-old pastoralist, was one of two candidates fielded by the Nationalist Party, and won the election with 56.42 percent of the two-party-preferred vote. He defeated five other candidates, including four who polled more than 10 percent on first preferences, and became the oldest person to win election to parliament in Western Australia for the first time.

== Background ==
Frederick Teesdale had held Roebourne for the Nationalist Party since the 1917 state election, generally with a large majority (and on one occasion running unopposed). He died at his home in Perth on 14 December 1931, having suffered from tuberculosis for two years. The writ for the by-election was issued on 17 December, with the close of nominations on 11 January. Polling day was on 6 February, with the writ returned on 15 February.

== Results ==
Roebourne state by-election, 1932
Party	Candidate	Votes	%	±%
Nationalist	John Church	108	28.9	n/a (Note: The combined Nationalist total was 158 votes or 42.2 percent, a swing of 27.9 points away from the party's total at the 1930 state election.)
Labor	John Archer	68	18.2	–11.7
Independent	Harold Cornish	61	16.3	+16.3
Independent	Ernest Foulkes-Taylor	54	14.4	+14.4
Nationalist	Richard Sleeman	50	13.4	n/a
Country	Charles Ferguson	33	8.8	+8.8
Total formal votes		374	96.9	–2.7
Informal votes		12	3.1	+2.7
Turnout		386	83.9	+9.7
Two-candidate-preferred result
Nationalist	John Church	211	56.4	–13.7
Independent	Harold Cornish	163	43.5	+43.6
Nationalist hold		Swing	N/A	

== Aftermath ==
Church held Roebourne for just over a year, losing the seat to Aloysius Rodoreda by 23 votes in the Labor landslide at the 1933 state election. Rodoreda remained in parliament until his death in 1958, transferring to the seat of Pilbara when Roebourne was abolished at the 1950 election.

== See also ==
- 1973 Balcatta state by-election, held in similar circumstances
- List of Western Australian state by-elections
