= Archibald Gilchrist =

Australian businessman and politician

Member of the Legislative Assembly of Western Australia
- In office 4 November 1914 – 29 September 1917
- Preceded by: John McDonald
- Succeeded by: Edward Angelo
- Constituency: Gascoyne

Personal details
- Born: 1878 North Melbourne, Victoria, Australia
- Died: 10 March 1955 (aged 76–77) Vaucluse, New South Wales, Australia
- Party: Liberal (to 1917); Nationalist (1917–?)
- Other political affiliations: Independent (1937)

Archibald Gilchrist (1878 – 10 March 1955) was an Australian businessman and politician. He served in the Legislative Assembly of Western Australia from 1914 to 1917, representing the seat of Gascoyne.

== Early life ==
Gilchrist was born in Melbourne to Hadassah (née Kendall) and Archibald Gilchrist, his father being a Presbyterian minister. He was raised in Sydney, and attended Sydney High School before finding work on the staff of the Public Library of New South Wales. Gilchrist moved to Carnarvon, Western Australia, in 1904, where he was the pastor of a Presbyterian church for a period (although without becoming ordained). He was later appointed manager of The Northern Times, a local newspaper which he eventually took over as proprietor.

== Politics and military service ==
In 1913, Gilchrist toured the North-West as an organiser for the Commonwealth Liberal Party, campaigning against the 1913 referendums. He was a prominent advocate of migration schemes, and served as secretary of the New Settlers' League and the Big Brother Movement. At the 1914 state election, Gilchrist was elected to the seat of Gascoyne for the Liberal Party. He defeated John McDonald, the sitting Labor member. Gilchrist enlisted in the Australian Imperial Force in December 1915, and served with a medical corps until receiving a medical discharge in December 1916. He returned to Carnarvon in time to contest the 1917 election, but was defeated by Edward Angelo.

== Later life ==
Gilchrist moved to Mildura, Victoria, in 1921, becoming a sub-editor of the Sunraysia Daily. He owned 3TR, a radio station servicing the Gippsland region, from 1934 to 1938, and at the 1937 Victorian state election unsuccessfully ran as an independent in the seat of Gippsland North. Between 1939 and 1945, Gilchrist lived in the United States and gave lectures about Australia on behalf of Rotary International. He died in Sydney in March 1955.

Parliament of Western Australia
Preceded by John McDonald	Member for Gascoyne; 1914–1917	Succeeded by Edward Angelo
