= Shire of Gascoyne-Minilya =

Former LGA in Western Australia

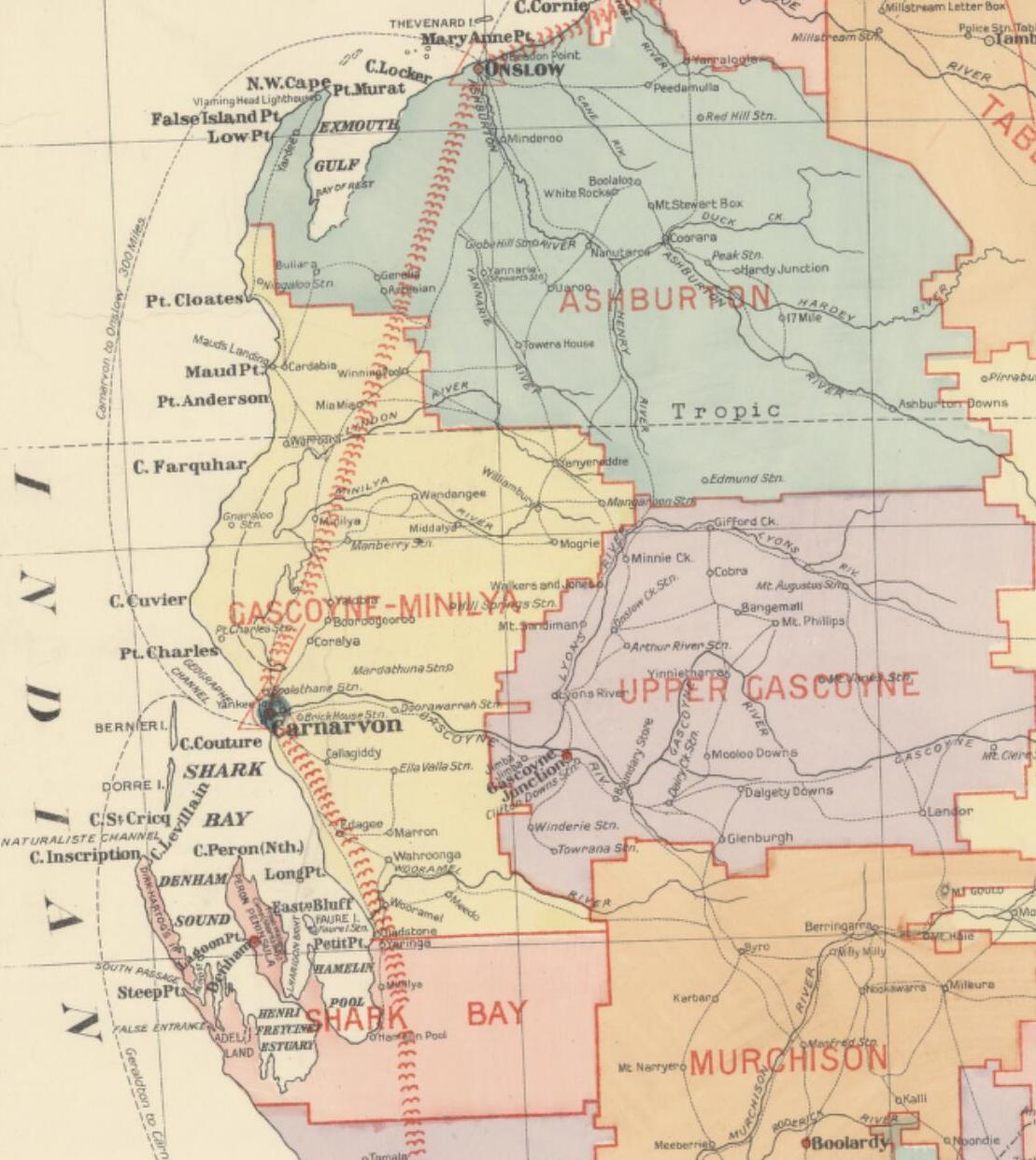
Gascoyne-Minilya (yellow) and surrounding road districts, 1933

The Shire of Gascoyne-Minilya was a local government area in Western Australia.

It was established on 17 March 1911 as the Gascoyne-Minilya Road District with the amalgamation of the Lower Gascoyne Road District and the Minilya Road District. It was based in the town of Carnarvon, although the township was located in the separate Municipality of Carnarvon.

A section of the district was severed on 11 August 1911 with the establishment of the Mullewa Road District.

It was declared a shire with effect from 1 July 1961 following the passage of the Local Government Act 1960, which reformed all remaining road districts into shires.

The Shire of Exmouth was separated from Gascoyne-Minilya on 13 December 1963 due to the development of the town of Exmouth.

It ceased to exist on 12 February 1965 when it amalgamated with the Town of Carnarvon to form the Shire of Carnarvon.
