= Daniel Norton (Australian politician) =

Australian politician

The Honourable Daniel Norton

20th Speaker of the Legislative Assembly of Western Australia
- In office 16 November 1971 – 30 March 1974
- Preceded by: Merv Toms
- Succeeded by: Ross Hutchinson

Member of the Legislative Assembly of Western Australia
- In office 14 February 1953 – 30 March 1974
- Preceded by: Noel Butcher
- Succeeded by: Ian Laurance
- Constituency: Gascoyne

Personal details
- Born: 12 July 1905 Wadhurst, Sussex, England
- Died: 10 January 1992 (aged 86) Perth, Western Australia, Australia
- Party: Labor

Daniel Norton (12 July 1905 – 10 January 1992) was an Australian politician who was a Labor Party member of the Legislative Assembly of Western Australia from 1953 to 1974, representing the seat of Gascoyne. He served as Speaker of the Legislative Assembly from 1971 to 1974.

== Early life ==
Norton was born in Wadhurst, Sussex, England. His family migrated to Victoria in 1913, where he attended the state school at Tresco before going on to Ballarat Grammar School. After leaving school, Norton was employed by the State Rivers and Water Supply Commission, working variously as a wheat lumper, truck driver, and mechanic. He came to Western Australia in 1928, living in Perth for a period before moving out to the Gascoyne, where he initially ran a service station at Wubin. Norton moved to Carnarvon in 1934, where he ran a general store, and from 1938 worked as a salesman for the International Harvester Company. He enlisted in the Australian Army in 1941, and served as a staff sergeant in the Royal Australian Electrical and Mechanical Engineers. After the end of the war, Norton returned to Carnarvon, where he purchased a banana plantation. He became a member of the Carnarvon Banana Growers' Association, and also chaired a local cooperative.

== Politics ==
Having joined the Labor Party as a young man, Norton first stood for parliament at the 1951 Gascoyne by-election (necessitated by the resignation of the former Labor premier, Frank Wise). He lost the by-election to an "independent Liberal" candidate, Noel Butcher, but successfully recontested the seat at the 1953 state election. After the 1971 election, which saw the election of a Labor government led by John Tonkin, Norton was appointed chairman of committees. He was elected to the speakership in November 1971, following the unexpected death of the previous speaker, Merv Toms, and served in that position until his retirement at the 1974 election. He was succeeded as the member for Gascoyne by Ian Laurance, and as speaker by Ross Hutchinson.

== See also ==
- Electoral results for the district of Gascoyne

Parliament of Western Australia
Preceded by Noel Butcher	Member for Gascoyne; 1953–1974	Succeeded by Ian Laurance
Preceded by Merv Toms	Speaker of the Legislative Assembly; 1971–1974	Succeeded by Ross Hutchinson
