= Mount Florence Station =

Pastoral lease in Western Australia

Coordinates: 21.4513°S 119.6513°E

Location in Western Australia

Mount Florence Station, often referred to as Mount Florence, is a pastoral lease that once operated as a sheep station but now operates as a cattle station.

It is located about 206 kilometres (128 mi) west-southwest of Marble Bar, 178 kilometres (111 mi) southwest of Port Hedland and 157 km southeast of Karratha in the Pilbara region of Western Australia.

The station was established in 1882 by W.A. and W.E. Robinson, who selected 100,000 acres (40,469 ha) of land just north of Mount Margaret in the Hamersley Range. The property is named because it was on a long flat hill and from the initials of the younger Robinson's fiancée, MF (Mary Francis).

The homestead was built in the 1890s. The oldest block in the complex was demolished owing to extensive termite damage. The homestead is a group of buildings arranged about a forecourt and set on different levels as they ascend the lower slope of the high hill to the south east.

In 1903 the property was acquired by John Church, who later was elected as the member for Roebourne. It remained in his possession until his death in 1937. The property was advertised for sale in 1948, when it occupied an area of 295,529 acres (119,596 ha) and had 24 paddocks for sheep and horses, and around 300 miles (483 km) of fencing. The property also had a six-room homestead, electric lights, septic tanks, kitchen, storerooms, various quarters, blacksmith shop and hay sheds. It was purchased by a South Australian pastoralist Richard Andrews. The Andrews family still owned the property in 2016.

== See also ==
- List of ranches and stations
- List of pastoral leases in Western Australia
