= Shire of Carnarvon =

Coordinates: 24°53′02″S 113°39′40″E

- Local government area
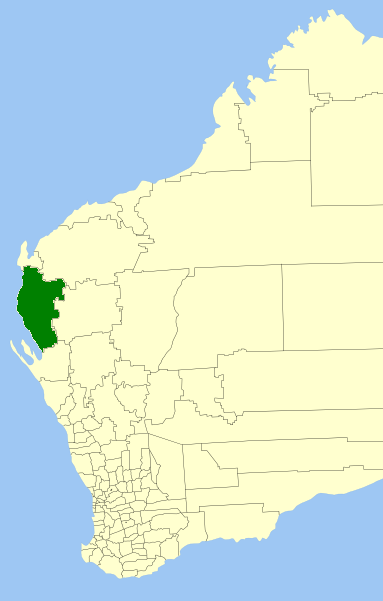
- Location in Western Australia

- Interactive map of Shire of Carnarvon
- Country: Australia
- State: Western Australia
- Region: Gascoyne
- Established: 1965
- Council seat: Carnarvon

Government
  - Shire President: Vacant
  - State electorate: North West
  - Federal division: Durack

Area
  - Total: 46,663.5 km^{2} (18,016.9 sq mi)

Population
  - Total: 5,251 (LGA 2021)
- Website: Shire of Carnarvon
LGAs around Shire of Carnarvon
Indian Ocean	Exmouth	Ashburton
Indian Ocean	Shire of Carnarvon	Upper Gascoyne
Indian Ocean	Shark Bay	Shark Bay

The Shire of Carnarvon is a local government area in the Gascoyne region of Western Australia, located about 900 kilometres (560 mi) north of the state capital, Perth. The Shire covers an area of 46,664 square kilometres (18,017 sq mi), and its seat of government is the town of Carnarvon. The major industries in the area are wool, agriculture (especially bananas and tomatoes) and, more recently, tourism.

== History ==
The Shire of Carnarvon was established on 12 February 1965 with the amalgamation of the Town of Carnarvon and the surrounding Shire of Gascoyne-Minilya.

Bernier Island, Dorre Island and Koks Island were included in the shire on 3 December 1982.

== Wards ==
The Shire is divided into 4 wards. The Shire President is directly elected to make a total of 8 elected members of Council.

- Shire President
- Town Ward (4 councillors)
- Plantation Ward
- Gascoyne/Minilya
- Coral Bay

== Towns, suburbs and localities ==
The towns, suburbs and localities of the Shire of Carnarvon with population and size figures based on the most recent Australian census:

Suburb	Population	Area	Map
Babbage Island	17 (SAL 2021)	8.9 km^{2} (3.4 sq mi)	
Bernier Island	0 (SAL 2016)	43.8 km^{2} (16.9 sq mi)	
Brockman	993 (SAL 2021)	1 km^{2} (0.39 sq mi)	
Brown Range	125 (SAL 2021)	11.3 km^{2} (4.4 sq mi)	
Carnarvon	281 (SAL 2021)	4.9 km^{2} (1.9 sq mi)	
Coral Bay	245 (SAL 2021)	2.2 km^{2} (0.85 sq mi)	
East Carnarvon	798 (SAL 2021)	4.3 km^{2} (1.7 sq mi)	
Greys Plains	156 (SAL 2021)	7.3 km^{2} (2.8 sq mi)	
Inggarda	21 (SAL 2021)	7,548.7 km^{2} (2,914.6 sq mi)	
Kennedy Range	4 (SAL 2021)	4,119.9 km^{2} (1,590.7 sq mi)	
Kingsford	261 (SAL 2021)	3.4 km^{2} (1.3 sq mi)	
Lyndon	31 (SAL 2021)	9,214.8 km^{2} (3,557.9 sq mi)	
Macleod	19 (SAL 2021)	5,946.8 km^{2} (2,296.1 sq mi)	
Massey Bay	0 (SAL 2016)	6 km^{2} (2.3 sq mi)	
Minilya	20 (SAL 2021)	9,031.3 km^{2} (3,487.0 sq mi)	
Morgantown	774 (SAL 2021)	2.3 km^{2} (0.89 sq mi)	
North Plantations	377 (SAL 2021)	28.7 km^{2} (11.1 sq mi)	
South Carnarvon	909 (SAL 2021)	3 km^{2} (1.2 sq mi)	
South Plantations	188 (SAL 2021)	9.1 km^{2} (3.5 sq mi)	
Wooramel	33 (SAL 2021)	777.4 km^{2} (300.2 sq mi)	
Yandoo Creek	3 (SAL 2021)	3,603.5 km^{2} (1,391.3 sq mi)	

== Notable councillors ==
- Dudley Maslen, Shire of Carnarvon councillor 1975–1988; later a state MP

== Heritage-listed places ==
As of 2024, 111 places are heritage-listed in the Shire of Carnarvon, of which 13 are on the State Register of Heritage Places.
