= Roebourne Regional Prison =

Prison in Western Australia

Coordinates: 20°43′17″S 117°08′00″E

Roeburne Regional Prison
- Interactive map of Roeburne Regional Prison
- Location: Roebourne, Western Australia
- Status: Operational
- Security class: Maximum (short-term), medium and minimum (Male and female)
- Capacity: 161
- Opened: March 1984
- Managed by: Department of Justice, Western Australia

Roebourne Regional Prison is an Australian prison near Roebourne in the City of Karratha in the Pilbara region of Western Australia. It was established in March 1984 following the closure of the colonial-era Roebourne Gaol.

As of November 2022 the new facility is controversial because of potential for deaths in custody of its predominantly Indigenous inmates—cells can swelter in 50-degree-Celsius temperatures with no air-conditioning.
