= Cyril Cornish =

Australian businessman and politician

Cyril Cornish DSO

Member of the Legislative Council of Western Australia
- In office 13 June 1942 – 21 May 1946
- Preceded by: Joseph Holmes
- Succeeded by: Mervyn Forrest
- Constituency: North Province

Personal details
- Born: 30 June 1891 Arakoon, New South Wales, Australia
- Died: 10 October 1961 (aged 70) Paddington, London, England
- Party: Independent

Military service
- Allegiance: Australia
- Branch/service: Australian Imperial Force
- Years of service: 1915–1919; 1942–1944
- Rank: Lieutenant
- Unit: 44th Battalion
- Battles/wars: First World War; Second World War
- Awards: Distinguished Service Order; Mentioned in Despatches

Cyril Richard Cornish, DSO (30 June 1891 – 10 October 1961) was an Australian businessman and politician who was an independent member of the Legislative Council of Western Australia from 1942 to 1946, representing North Province.

Cornish was born in Arakoon, New South Wales, but moved to Western Australia as a child. After leaving school, he worked for periods with a merchant firm in Katanning, as a miner on the Eastern Goldfields, and as an engine driver for Western Australian Government Railways. Cornish enlisted in the Australian Imperial Force in December 1915, and during the war served in France with the 44th Battalion. He was wounded in action twice in 1918, for which he was made a Companion of the Distinguished Service Order. After leaving the military, Cornish moved to Onslow, where he was a publican and was also elected to the Ashburton Road Board.

In 1925, Cornish moved to Carnarvon to become the licensee of the Gascoyne Hotel. He was elected to the Carnarvon Municipal Council the same year, and served as a councillor until 1935 (including as mayor from 1929 to 1932). Cornish entered parliament in June 1942, winning a Legislative Council by-election caused by the death of Joseph Holmes. He stood for re-election in 1946, but was defeated by Mervyn Forrest of the Liberal Party. Cornish lived in Perth after leaving parliament, where he was the licensee of two hotels. He died in October 1961, aged 70, while visiting England. Cornish had married Marjorie Richardson in 1927, with whom he had five children. A nephew, Dick Old, was also a member of parliament.
