= Town of Carnarvon =

Former LGA in Western Australia

The Town of Carnarvon was a local government area in Western Australia.

It was established as the Municipality of Carnarvon on 4 June 1891. The council chambers were located in the existing Jubilee Hall building in Francis Street, Carnarvon throughout its history. Many council records were lost in 1960 when Jubilee Hall was badly damaged by a cyclone.

In 1919, the council purchased the assets of the Carnarvon Electric Light and Power Company and took over the supply of electricity and lighting to the municipality, funded by a loan and an increase to the general rate.

It gained town status as the Town of Carnarvon on 1 July 1961.

It ceased to exist on 12 February 1965 when it amalgamated with the surrounding Shire of Gascoyne-Minilya to form the Shire of Carnarvon.

Politicians Edward Angelo, Cyril Cornish and Wilson Tuckey were former mayors of the Carnarvon municipality before their respective elections to state and federal parliament. Tuckey was the final mayor before the amalgamation and the first president of the amalgamated shire.
