= Thalu =

Australian children's fantasy television series

- Created by: Tyson Mowarin
- Written by: Nayuka Gorrie, Beck Cole, Sam Paynter, David Woodhead, Donald Imberlong
- Directed by: Amie Batalibasi, Dena Curtis, Hunter Page-Lochard, Tyson Mowarin
- Starring: Elaine Crombie; Trisha Morton-Thomas; Hunter Page-Lochard, Mark O'Toole
- Theme music composer: Ned Beckley and Josh Hogan
- Country of origin: Australia
- No. of episodes: 10

Original release
- Network: National Indigenous Television and ABC Me
- Release: 20 April – 24 April 2020

Thalu is an Australian children's post-apocalyptic sci-fi drama television series made for National Indigenous Television (NITV) and ABC Me, broadcast in April 2020. All cast members are Indigenous Australians, and the children are first-time actors. There are guest appearances by seasoned actors Elaine Crombie, Trisha Morton-Thomas, and Hunter Page-Lochard. It was filmed in the Pilbara region of Western Australia.

== Synopsis ==
The ten-part series focuses on a group of Indigenous children who undertake a journey to save their country from the threat of a mysterious dust cloud and its inhabitants, the Takers. The group have to travel to the powerful location of Thalu, collecting eight sacred stones and a key and meeting friends and enemies along the way.

Page-Lochard described it as "its own little Dreaming, its own little spirit world where Indigenous people inhabit, and there's folklore characters and characters with different stories that reflect the land and the world that they come from".

== Cast ==
- Logan Adams as Noodles
- Cherry-Rose Hubert as Em
- Jakeile Coffin as Keile
- Sharliya Mowarin as Kali
- Ella Togo as Samara
- Wade Walker as Hudson
- Penny Wally as Vinka

=== Guests ===
- Elaine Crombie as Bits and Bobs, an eccentric pedlar
- Trevor Ryan as Jack in a Box
- Gabriel Willie as Man up a Tree
- Tootsie Daniel, Allery Sandy, Jean Churnside, Judith Coppin, Pansy Hicks, Pansy Sambo, Violet Samson as The Nannas
- Trisha Morton-Thomas as The Principal
- Aaron McGrath as Random Dan
- Wendyl Alex as Big Joey
- Ashton Munda as Traditional Man
- Trevor Jamieson as The Shadow Boxer
- Derik Lynch as The Trainer
- Maverick Eaton, Sidney Eaton, Fabian Togo, Tiras Walker as Boxers
- Hunter Page-Lochard as The Trapper
- Dave Johnson as The Nhuka
- Della Rae Morrison as Aunty
- Tameeka Rassip-Andrews as Other Gang Girl
- Zack Levi as Other Gang Boy
- Leon Burchill, Billy McPherson as The Brothers

== Production ==
The series was co-commissioned by NITV and ABC Children's (a partnership previously exercised for Little J & Big Cuz and Grace Beside Me), with principal funding from Screen Australia in association with Screenwest and the Western Australian Regional Film Fund, and with support from NITV, ABC, and the Australian Children's Television Foundation (ACTF).

The working title of the project was Neomad, with the initial intention of basing the story on the interactive Aboriginal graphic novel and three-part series of that name set in Murujuga (Burrup Peninsula). Thalu is the Ngarluma word for "totem", and is used to refers to ceremonial sites, often important for the regeneration of key species.

The series was filmed in the Pilbara region of Western Australia and the cast are from Roebourne (known as Ieramugadu to the local people). Each character has been written with input from the young cast member to reflect their personality, sense of humour and culture. Beck Cole and Sam Paynter workshopped ideas with the local elders and young people to produce ideas for the storyline, starting in 2018. There was a great deal of community collaboration on the project, which was described as "an unprecedented, top-to-bottom model for community consultation". The elders who consulted on the series appear as The Nannas in the series. Words from the local language, Ngarluma, are used in the script.

Thalu was directed by Amie Batalibasi, Dena Curtis (producer, writer and director, including directing 8MMM Aboriginal Radio), Ngarluma artist Tyson Mowarin, and Hunter Page-Lochard, and created for National Indigenous Television (NITV) and ABC Me. Writers included Nayuka Gorrie, Beck Cole, Sam Paynter, David Woodhead, and Donald Imberlong. Shooting took eight weeks, done entirely on location in the Pilbara.

The show was produced by Tyson Mowarin and Robyn Marais from Weerianna Street Media, in association with the ACTF. Mark O'Toole, who has been head writer and producer on series such as Spicks and Specks, Black Comedy, and children's comedy program You're Skitting Me was executive producer, and helped to develop the storyline. The series music was composed by Ned Beckley and Josh Hogan.

== Broadcast ==
Thalu premiered on 20 April 2020 on NITV, and was made available on SBS on Demand as well as ABC iview.

== Accolades ==
In February 2020, Thalu was nominated in the Screen Diversity and Inclusion Network (SDIN) Awards, but lost out to Blackfella Films' documentary film Maralinga Tjarutja, directed by Larissa Behrendt, when the awards were announced a year later.

On 1 December 2020, Ned Beckley and Josh Hogan won the APRA AMCOS / Australian Guild of Screen Composers award for Best Music for Children's Television in the Screen Music Awards.

== Thalu: Dreamtime Is Now ==
In 2018, Ngarluma artist Tyson Mowarin wrote and directed an 18-minute VR experience called Thalu: Dreamtime Is Now. The story involved a spirit guide called Jirri Jirri, who introduces some of the spirits and traditional custodians according to the Dreaming stories of the Ngarluma people.

Thalu: Dreamtime Is Now, was shortlisted in the Best Digital Product category in the 2019 First Nations Media Awards.

== See also ==
- Little J & Big Cuz
- Grace Beside Me
