= John Sydney Hicks =

Australian politician

Member of the Legislative Assembly of Western Australia
- In office 24 April 1901 – 30 September 1908
- Preceded by: Horace Sholl
- Succeeded by: Henry Osborn
- Constituency: Roebourne

Personal details
- Born: 24 March 1864 Falmouth, Cornwall, England
- Died: 20 April 1931 (aged 67) South Mimms, Hertfordshire, England
- Education: London Hospital Medical College

John Sydney Hicks (24 March 1864 – 20 April 1931) was a British physician and surgeon. He lived in Australia from 1891 to 1912, and was a member of the Legislative Assembly of Western Australia from 1901 to 1908, including as a minister in the government of Hector Rason.

Hicks was born in Falmouth, Cornwall, to Grace (née George) and John Sampson Hicks. He attended Falmouth Grammar School before going on to the London Hospital Medical College, where he received his M.B. in 1888 and his M.D. in 1890. He worked as a surgeon and physician at London Hospital for a period, but in 1891 moved to Australia to take a position as resident medical officer in Roebourne, Western Australia (a remote town in the Pilbara region). At the 1901 state election, Hicks was elected to the seat of Roebourne, replacing the retiring Horace Sholl. He initially sat as an independent, but later aligned himself with the Ministerialist (or Liberal) faction that came to be led by Hector Rason.

When Rason became premier in August 1905, he appointed Hicks as Minister for Commerce and Labour in his new ministry. However, Rason resigned as premier in May 1906, and Hicks was not retained as a minister by the new premier, Newton Moore. He remained in parliament until the 1908 state election, which he did not contest. Hicks had established a private practice in Guildford (near Perth) in 1906. He eventually returned to England, practising at Falmouth (his birthplace) for a while and then retiring to Hertfordshire, where he died in 1931. Hicks had married Margaret Pearce in 1899, with whom he had two children.

Parliament of Western Australia
Preceded by Horace Sholl	Member for Roebourne; 1901–1908	Succeeded by Henry Osborn
Political offices
Preceded by John Holman	Minister for Commerce and Labour; 1905–1906	Succeeded by James Connolly
