= Neomad =

Australian interactive sci-fi fantasy and comic

Neomad is an Australian three-episode sci-fi fantasy adventure series that includes a comic book as well as an interactive comic that runs on an iPad. It was created in part of the Yijala Yala project run by art and social justice organisation Big hART between 2011 and 2015, in collaboration with around 50 young Aboriginal Australian people in Roebourne, Western Australia (known as Ieramugadu to the locals). It lays claim to being the "world's first Aboriginal interactive comic book".

== Background ==
Big hART, which initiates large-scale, long-term community cultural development projects in disadvantaged communities across Australia, ran the Yijala Yala project in concert with the Roebourne community from 2011 until 2015. Its aim was to help develop skills and create future opportunities for young people in Roebourne, incorporating its cultural heritage. Yijala Yala means "now" in both of the local languages, Ngarluma and Yindjibarndi.

The project was established in late 2010 after senior women Elders invited Big hART to collaborate on a project with the leramugadu community. The primary funders of the project were the Australian Government and Woodside Energy, who have signed a conservation agreement. The project produced a variety of content in different media, including theatre, films, exhibitions and video, many of which were well-reviewed and awarded. Apart from Neomad, other titles included Hipbone Sticking Out, Murru, and Smashed Films. The project included 21 short films, which were made available on DVD.

In the early stages of the Yijala Yala project, Big hART set out to begin building digital media skills, creating content and passing on stories through everyday technologies including mobile phones, computers, television and radio. A group of 15 boys, a worker from a resource company, and two young mothers came together under the mentorship of a professional filmmaker, choreographer, and actor, resulting in a comic film called Love Sweet Love Punks.

A series of workshops was conducted by Stu Campbell (a.k.a. Sutu), at Roebourne District High School, developing a game called Love Punks, with around 50 young people aged between 7 and 14. Neomad built on Love Punks' themes and characters.

== Description ==
One of the project objectives of working with sponsor Woodside was to promote Murujuga (the Burrup Peninsula) as a significant cultural heritage site, so Neomad features Murujuga. The work is science fiction and humorous, but draws on real characters, places, and stories from the Dreaming. It is located in the ancient landscape of Murujuga, which includes famous petroglyphs. It aims to help connect young people to their country and highlight the rich Indigenous culture of the Pilbara region.

The young people who helped to create Neomad also star in the work, designated as 14 heroes and heroines known as the Love Punks or Satellite Sisters.

Neomad was first published in 2012 as an interactive iPad comic. Campbell drew the line art, while the children, after learning to use Photoshop, coloured the 600 scenes in them.

The books are published by Gestalt Publishing, in collaboration with Big hART. In the interactive version, the user can click the speech bubbles on the animated panels, to hear the recordings of the narrative made by the children, in their voices.

There are three episodes of Neomad:

- Episode 1: "Space Junk"
- Episode 2: "The Last Crystal"
- Episode 3: "Porkchop Plots"

Neomad was free to download over April and May 2016.

== Documentaries ==
Big hArt made a short documentary film How Do We Get To Space? The Story Of Love Punks and Satellite Sisters, which won the Best Documentary – Short Form award at the 2014 ATOM 2014 IP Awareness ATOM Awards.

Neomad was featured in the 2014 ABC documentary about artist Stuart Campbell called Cyber Dreaming.

== Reception ==
Neomad has been presented at conferences throughout Australia and has been profiled extensively throughout the media sphere and academic journals. It was featured in the Bucheon International Comic Festival in South Korea in 2012, and was described by Kirkus Reviews as "dazzling".

Neomad was optioned to a Melbourne-based animation company to be adapted in to an animated series. The comic has been profiled on The Guardian and The Huffington Post.

== Accolades ==
- 2013: Finalist, New Media Festival in Los Angeles
- 2013: ATOM Award for Best Game/Multimedia Production
- Kirkus Reviews listed Neomad as one of its "Best Apps & E-Books of 2013 for Middle-Grade Readers"
- 2016: Gold Ledger Award for the printed comic version printed edition

== Impact ==
The project had a positive impact on school attendance by children, boosted their confidence, and boosted their digital literacy skills.

The 2020 NITV / ABC Me series Thalu was inspired by Neomad, and initially given the same title. It too involved working with children from Roebourne, and involved extensive community collaboration. It was produced by local producers Tyson Mowarin and Robyn Marais of Weerianna Street Media, in association with the ACTF.
