= Henry Osborn (politician) =

Australian politician

- Constituency: Roebourne

Personal details
- Born: 2 June 1859 Victoria Plains, Colony of Western Australia
- Died: 22 July 1937 (aged 78) Bruce Rock, Western Australia
- Spouse(s): Ada Cave; Elizabeth Thompson

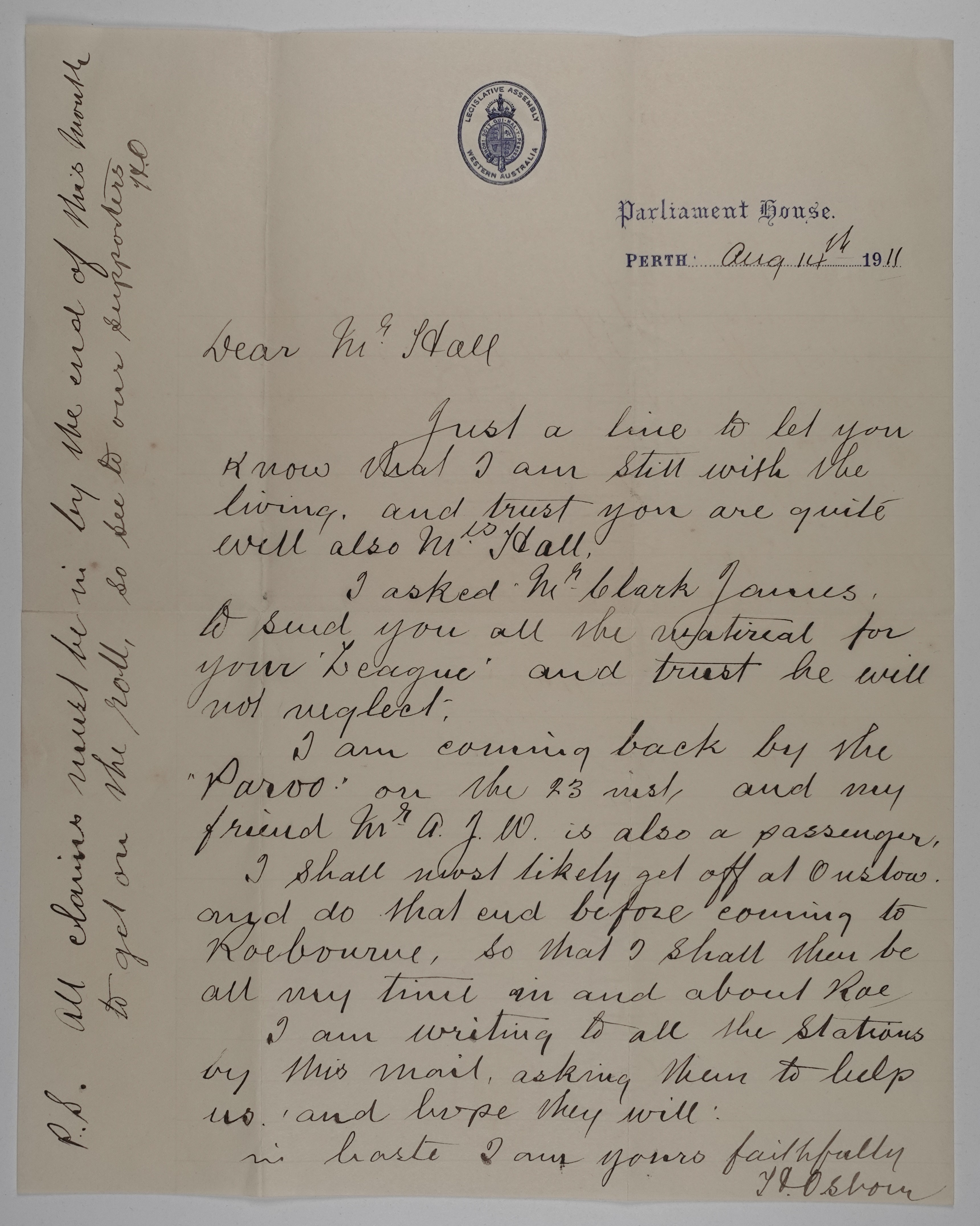
A 1911 letter by Osborn regarding John Forrest's Liberal League.

Henry Osborn (2 June 1859 – 22 July 1937) was an Australian politician, and a member of the Western Australian Legislative Assembly from 1908 until 1911 representing the seat of Roebourne, as well as the mayor of two different municipalities in Western Australia.

== Biography ==
Osborn was born in the Victoria Plains region to William Osborn, a blacksmith, and Sarah née Newsom. He was educated locally, and in 1884, moved to the North West region where he worked at first as a labourer, then as a blacksmith and wheelwright in the town of Roebourne, as well as working as an undertaker. On 23 May 1888, he married Ada Cave at the Cossack Church, but she died only nine months later. Osborn then became a carrier of gold between the Pilbara goldfields and Roebourne, but later returned to Roebourne where, by 1891, he had taken up employment as the publican at the Jubilee Hotel with his sister Rose. On 19 December 1894, he married Elizabeth Thompson at Roebourne, with whom he was to have two sons and one daughter. In December 1894, he was elected mayor of the Roebourne Municipal Council, in which capacity he served for two years.

In 1897, he moved to Midland Junction and became a partner in an aerated waters firm. He entered the Midland Junction Municipal Council following a by-election in 1903 and continued for the next seven years. At the September 1908 state election, he was elected to the Legislative Assembly for a three-year term as the Ministerial member for Roebourne. At the October 1911 state election, he was defeated by a Labor candidate.

In 1910, following Minister for Lands James Mitchell's call for men to take up land and populate the interior, Osborn and his brother -in-law acquired land in Bruce Rock in the eastern Wheatbelt region, where he farmed for the rest of his life. He became involved in the Bruce Rock Co-operative Society, and was its inaugural chairman from 1917 until his death.

Osborn died on 22 July 1937 at Bruce Rock, where he was buried.

Preceded by John Sydney Hicks	Member for Roebourne; 1908–1911	Succeeded by Joseph Gardiner
