= Frederick Teesdale =

Australian politician (1864–1931)

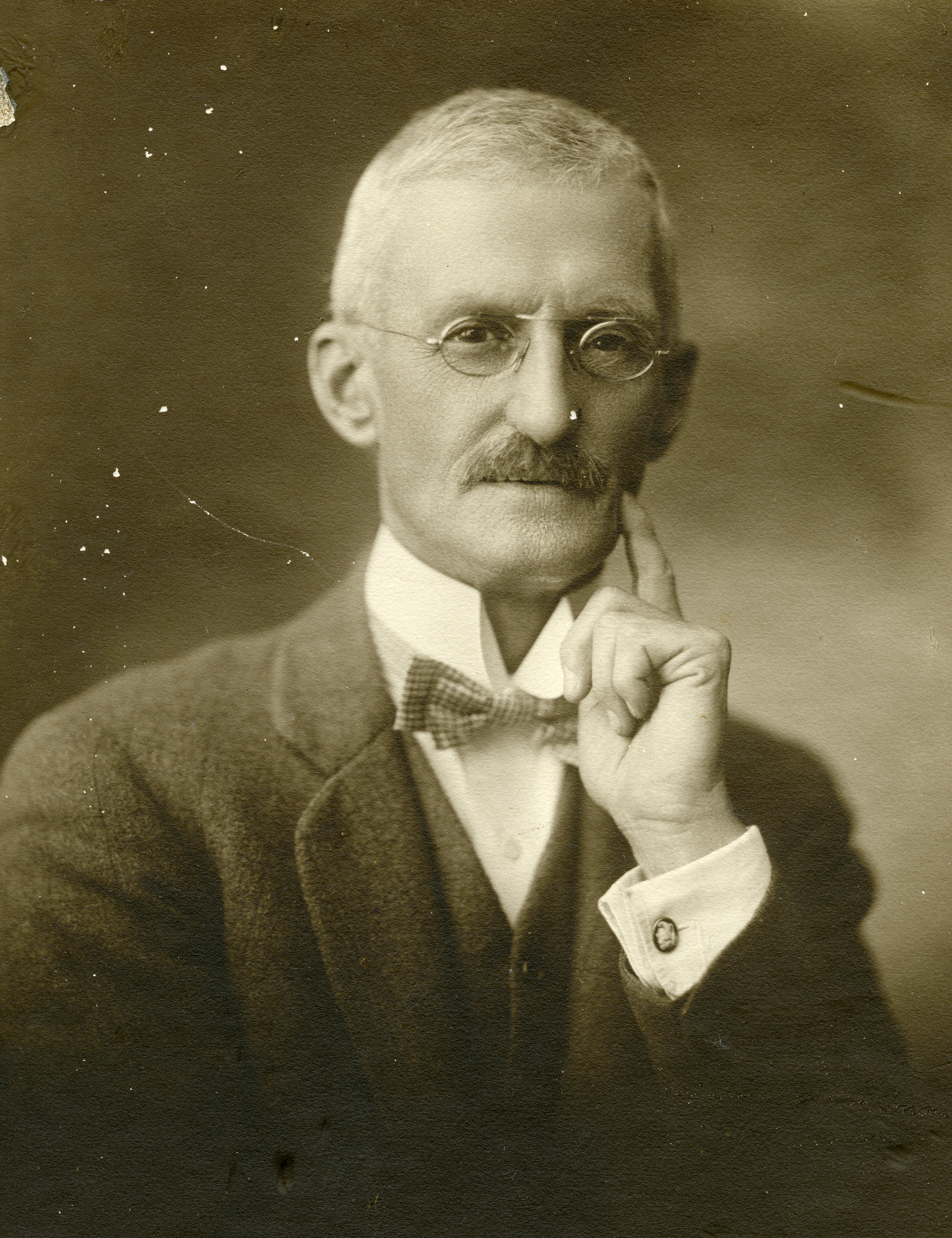

Member of the Legislative Assembly of Western Australia
- In office 18 October 1917 – 14 December 1931
- Preceded by: William Butcher
- Succeeded by: John Church
- Constituency: Roebourne

Personal details
- Born: 3 April 1864 Boston, Lincolnshire, England
- Died: 14 December 1931 (aged 67) Nedlands, Western Australia, Australia
- Party: Liberal (1914); Nationalist (from 1917)

Frederick William Teesdale (3 April 1864 – 14 December 1931) was an Australian politician who was a Nationalist Party member of the Legislative Assembly of Western Australia from 1917 until his death, representing the seat of Roebourne.

Teesdale was born in Boston, Lincolnshire, England, to Sarah (née Clement) and Eli Teesdale. He came to Australia as a young man, and after periods living in South Australia and Victoria settled in the North-West. Teesdale initially engaged in prospecting and pearling, but from 1889 kept a store in Roebourne. He served on the Roebourne Municipal Council from 1895 to 1897 and again from 1900 to 1901. Teesdale first stood for parliament at the 1914 state election, contesting Roebourne for the Liberal Party but losing to Joseph Gardiner of the Labor Party. He recontested the seat at the 1917 election for the Nationalist Party, and was elected. Teesdale was re-elected on another four occasions, including unopposed in 1924, but died in office in December 1931, of tuberculosis. He had married Lilian Hall (née Bruce), a widow, in 1893, but they had no children. He is buried in Karrakatta Cemetery.

Parliament of Western Australia
Preceded by William Butcher	Member for Roebourne; 1917–1931	Succeeded by John Church
