= George Hubble =

Australian politician

Member of the Legislative Assembly of Western Australia
- In office 28 April 1897 – 24 April 1901 (Note: Hubble was not an MP between 13 and 26 June 1899, during the period between his resignation and his re-election.)
- Preceded by: Robert Sholl
- Succeeded by: William Butcher
- Constituency: Gascoyne

Personal details
- Born: 28 November 1858 Bendigo, Victoria, Australia
- Died: 22 March 1906 (aged 47) East Perth, Western Australia, Australia

George Yorke Hubble (28 November 1858 – 22 March 1906) was an Australian politician who was a member of the Legislative Assembly of Western Australia from 1897 to 1901 (excluding a brief gap in 1899), representing the seat of Gascoyne.

Hubble was born in Bendigo, Victoria, where his father had arrived during the Victorian gold rush. He came to Western Australia in the 1880s, initially living in the South West, but by 1890 was a merchant in Fremantle. Hubble eventually went into partnership with David Symon (another MP), establishing the firm Symon, Hammond, & Hubble. In 1896, he moved to Carnarvon (the largest town in the Gascoyne region), where he opened a general store. Hubble was elected to parliament at the 1897 general election, replacing the retiring Robert Sholl. However, in June 1899, he was declared bankrupt, meaning he had to resign his seat. He was re-elected unopposed at the resulting by-election, but chose not to re-contest his seat at the 1901 general election. Hubble left Carnarvon in 1903 to live in Perth. He died in East Perth in March 1906, aged 47, having killed himself by cutting his neck with a razor. Hubble had married twice, and had one son by his first wife, who was a daughter of William Silas Pearse.

== Notes ==
Parliament of Western Australia
| Preceded by Robert Sholl | Member for Gascoyne; 1897–1901 | Succeeded by William Butcher |
