= Dudley Maslen =

Western Australian politician

Dudley John Maslen OAM (born 2 April 1948) is an Australian politician.

He was born at Carnarvon to pastoralist John Andrew Maslen and Joan Carmel Stroud. He was educated by correspondence before attending St Patrick's College in Geraldton and Guildford Grammar School. He became a pastoralist. On 2 March 1973 he married Christine Jennifer Samson; they had four children. He served on Carnarvon Shire Council from 1975 to 1988. A Liberal Party member, he was elected to the Western Australian Legislative Assembly in 1987 as the member for Gascoyne. In 1989 he ran unsuccessfully for Northern Rivers. After his defeat he joined the National Party, and contested the Western Australian Legislative Council in 1996 and 2001 and the Senate in 1998.

Maslen was awarded the Medal of the Order of Australia in the 2022 Queen's Birthday Honours for "service to the community of the Carnarvon region." Currently, Maslen is serving as a Councillor for the Shire of Carnarvon.

Western Australian Legislative Assembly
Preceded by Ian Laurance	Member for Gascoyne; 1987–1989	Abolished
