= Aloysius Rodoreda =

Australian politician (1892–1958)

15th Speaker of the Legislative Assembly of Western Australia
- In office 6 August 1953 – 1 August 1956
- Premier: Albert Hawke
- Preceded by: Charles North
- Succeeded by: James Hegney

Member of the Legislative Assembly of Western Australia
- In office 8 April 1933 – 25 March 1950
- Preceded by: John Church
- Succeeded by: None (abolished)
- Constituency: Roebourne
- In office 25 March 1950 – 11 March 1958
- Preceded by: Bill Hegney
- Succeeded by: Arthur Bickerton
- Constituency: Pilbara

Personal details
- Born: 29 May 1892 Perth, Western Australia
- Died: 11 March 1958 (aged 65) Melbourne, Victoria
- Party: Labor

Aloysius Joseph "Loy" Rodoreda (29 May 1892 – 11 March 1958) was an Australian politician who was the Speaker of the Legislative Assembly of Western Australia from 1953 to 1956. A member of the Labor Party, he sat in parliament from 1933 to his death in 1958, first representing Roebourne and then Pilbara, both located in the state's North-West.

Rodoreda was born in Perth to Julia (née Down) and Edward John Rodoreda, a storekeeper of Catalan and Irish descent. From a Roman Catholic family, he was educated at Christian Brothers' College, Perth, and subsequently held a variety of jobs in country Western Australia, including as a clerk at Wyndham, a Public Works Department paymaster at Kondinin, and a wharfinger and general merchant at Roebourne. Rodoreda was first elected to parliament at the 1933 state election, becoming only the second member of the Labor Party to represent Roebourne, an original Legislative Assembly district. He defeated the sitting Nationalist member, John Church, who had only been elected to parliament in a by-election the previous year.

Although Labor was in government from the 1933 election through to the 1947 election, Rodoreda was not a member of any of the ministries led by Philip Collier, John Willcock, and Frank Wise. He was, however, a member of several Legislative Assembly committees, and served as Opposition Whip from 1947 to 1950, following the defeat of Wise's government. Roebourne was abolished at a redistribution prior to the 1950 election, and Rodoreda successfully transferred to Pilbara, another original electorate. He held comfortable majorities throughout his time in parliament, on two occasions gaining over two-thirds of the vote.

Following Labor's return to government at the 1953 election, Rodoreda was elected speaker. He presided over a "heavy legislative programme", with the new premier, Albert Hawke, passing a record number of bills in the first session of the new parliament despite conflict with the Legislative Council. Following the Labor candidate's defeat at the 1955 Bunbury by-election, Rodoreda's position as speaker meant Hawke's government was reduced to a minority in the Legislative Assembly. A motion of no confidence failed to pass, however, and Labor gained a three-seat majority at the 1956 election. Rodoreda was replaced as speaker by James Hegney, but remained in parliament until his death in Melbourne in March 1958. Labor's Arthur Bickerton won Pilbara at the resulting by-election, elected unopposed.

Parliament of Western Australia
Preceded by John Church	Member for Roebourne; 1933–1950	Succeeded by Seat abolished
Preceded by Bill Hegney	Member for Pilbara; 1950–1958	Succeeded by Arthur Bickerton
Preceded by Charles North	Speaker of the Legislative Assembly; 1953–1956	Succeeded by James Hegney
