= Noel Butcher =

Australian politician

Member of the Legislative Assembly of Western Australia
- In office 13 October 1951 – 14 February 1953
- Preceded by: Frank Wise
- Succeeded by: Daniel Norton
- Constituency: Gascoyne

Personal details
- Born: 19 November 1894 Mardella, Western Australia, Australia
- Died: 23 January 1968 (aged 73) Kwinana Beach, Western Australia, Australia
- Party: Independent

Noel Albert Butcher (19 November 1894 – 23 January 1968) was an Australian businessman and politician who served as an independent member of the Legislative Assembly of Western Australia from 1951 to 1953, representing the seat of Gascoyne.

Butcher was born in Mardella (on the outskirts of Perth) to Rachael (née White) and Hugh John Butcher. He left school at the age of 14, and began working at the Midland Railway Workshops as an apprentice fitter and turner. In the 1920s, Butcher worked variously as a bank teller, engineer, and sheep farmer (at Bindi Bindi). He eventually trained as a mining engineer, and worked for periods at Mount Morgans, Yellowdine, and Marble Bar (as mine manager and a company director). Butcher enlisted in the Royal Australian Air Force (RAAF) during World War II, serving with engineering and field radar units.

Discharged from the RAAF in 1944, Butcher initially returned to mining, working at Nullagine and briefly serving on the Nullagine Road Board. He moved to Carnarvon in late 1945, where he grew bananas. Butcher entered parliament at the 1951 Gascoyne by-election, caused by the resignation of Frank Wise (a former Labor premier). He stood as an "Independent Liberal" candidate, and was elected with 51.3 percent of the two-candidate-preferred vote. Butcher's time in politics was short-lived, however, as he was defeated by Labor's Daniel Norton at the 1953 state election. He eventually left Carnarvon, operating a fuel depot at Karlgarin for a few years before retiring to Mandurah. Butcher died in a road accident in 1968, aged 73.
