= Joseph Gardiner (Western Australian politician) =

Australian politician

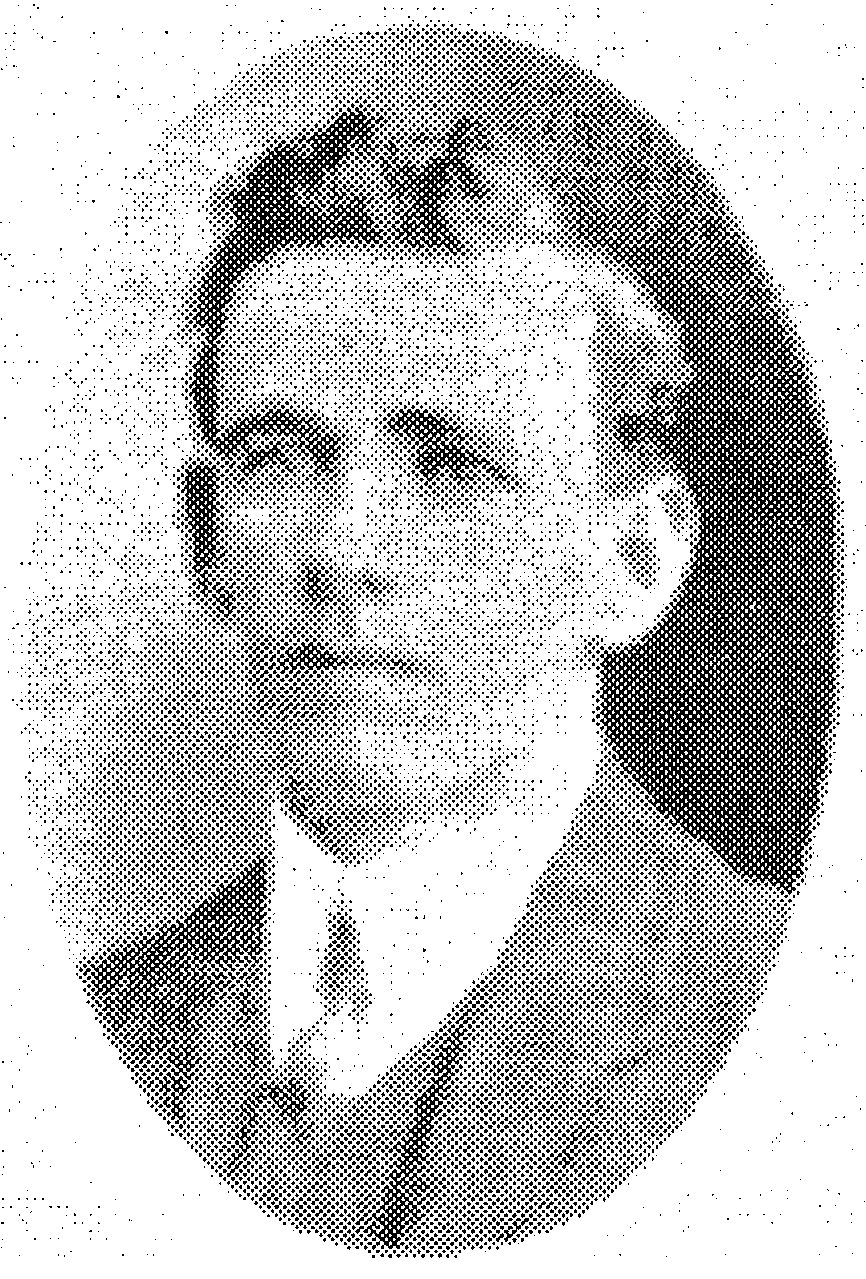

Member of the Western Australian Parliament for Roebourne
- In office 31 October 1911 – 30 September 1915
- Preceded by: Henry Osborn
- Succeeded by: William Butcher

Personal details
- Born: Joseph Peter Gardiner; 4 July 1886 Adelaide, South Australia
- Died: 23 January 1965 (aged 78) Melbourne, Victoria
- Citizenship: Australian
- Party: Labor Party
- Spouse(s): May Holman (1914–1920); Bertha Paver (1922–19??)

Joseph Peter Gardiner (4 July 1886 – 23 January 1965) was the Labor Party member for the Western Australian Legislative Assembly seat of Roebourne from 1911 to 1915. His sudden and still unexplained departure from Western Australia in 1915 was an important factor in the collapse of John Scaddan's Labor government.

== Early life ==
Joseph Peter Gardiner was born in Adelaide on 4 July 1886. He was educated at the Christian Brothers College in that city, and was then apprenticed to his bootmaker father in West Perth. Later he went to the Pilbara region, where he traded on the coast between Cossack and Broome. He was secretary of the Miners' Union at Whim Creek, and from 1910 to 1912 was manager of the Weld Hotel in Cossack.

== Political career ==
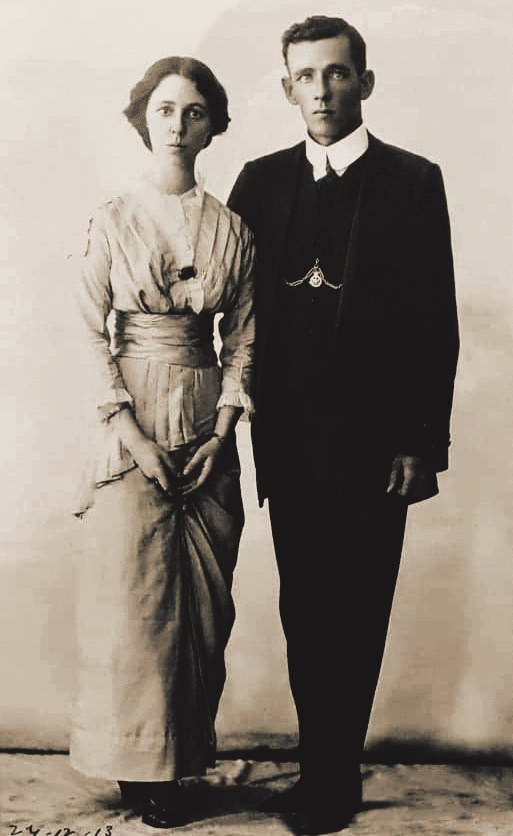
Gardiner with May Holman a few months before their marriage

On 31 October 1911, Gardiner was elected to the Western Australian Legislative Assembly seat of Roebourne. In 1913 and 1914 he lived in West Perth, and was secretary of the Bootmakers' Union.

In May 1914, Gardiner secretly married May Holman – daughter of his parliamentary colleague John Holman – at the Perth Registry Office, but the marriage was never consummated and a divorce was finalised in 1920.

Shortly after the marriage, Gardiner left the State, never to return. After an extended absence from Parliament, inquiries were eventually made as to his whereabouts. When it was learned that he had left the State, Gardiner's seat was declared vacant on 30 September 1915, on the grounds of non-attendance. The Labor Party did not retain the seat in the subsequent by-election, and its majority of two was erased. Shortly afterwards, another Labor member resigned, and John Scaddan's government was defeated.

== Later life ==
Little is known of the rest of Gardiner's life. After he left Western Australia, Gardiner went to South Australia, then to Victoria where he enlisted in early 1916.

He was working as a labourer in Adelaide in 1921, and in June of that year, he married Bertha Annie Paver. He subsequently worked at various occupations while living for many years in Melbourne, Victoria.

From 1932, he lived at Bentleigh, Victoria. He was listed on the Victorian electoral rolls as a "journalist" when he died on 23 January 1965.

== General references ==
- Black, David (1 December 1981). "Party Politics in Turmoil". In C. T. Stannage (ed.). A New History of Western Australia. Nedlands: UWA Publishing. ISBN 0-85564-181-9. LCCN 82101009. OCLC 963830667. OL 3517729M. Wikidata Q125995168.
- Black, David (1 December 1981). "The Era of Labor Ascendancy". In C. T. Stannage (ed.). A New History of Western Australia. Nedlands: UWA Publishing. ISBN 0-85564-181-9. LCCN 82101009. OCLC 963830667. OL 3517729M. Wikidata Q125995168.
- Black, David; Bolton, Geoffrey (2001a). Biographical Register of Members of the Parliament of Western Australia. Vol. One: 1870–1930 (Revised ed.). Parliament House: Parliament of Western Australia. ISBN 0730738140.
