= William Butcher =

Australian politician

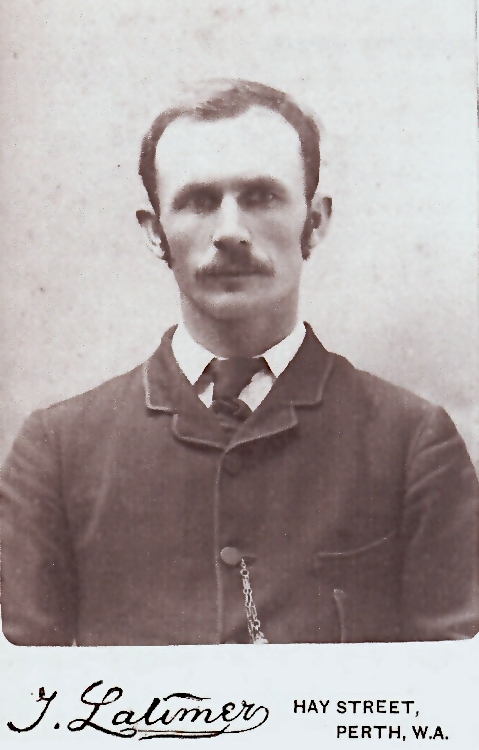
William Butcher as a young man

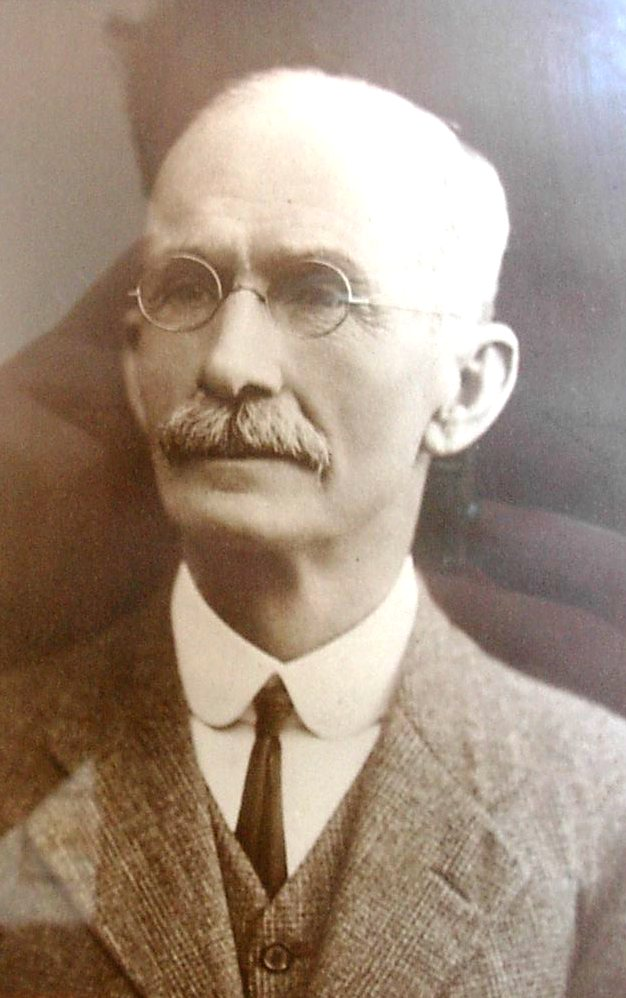
William Butcher in his later years

William James Burchell Butcher (24 July 1858 – 24 May 1944) was an Australian politician who was a member of the Western Australian Legislative Assembly.

Born in Richmond, Tasmania on 24 July 1858, William Butcher was the son of squatter and landowner Edward William Burchell Butcher, and Maria Susan née Schaw. He was educated at private schools in Melbourne, Victoria.

In 1876, Butcher's father joined with other Victorian investors in forming the Murchison River Squatting Company. The following year Butcher, his father and his brother Charles John Hunt Butcher emigrated to Western Australia, establishing Barrington Station in the Murchison district. In 1878 Butcher took part in an exploring expedition that aimed to find a shorter route to port from the Lower Gascoyne district, where he later purchased land. He later also bought Boolathana Station near Carnarvon in partnership with John Brockman, whose niece Margaret Harriet Brockman he married on 5 November 1892. They had three sons and five daughters.

Butcher became a Justice of the Peace in 1898. On 24 April 1901, he was elected to the Legislative Assembly seat of Gascoyne as an independent, succeeding George Hubble who had not contested the election. He sat as a Liberal after 1905, holding the seat until the election of 3 October 1911, when he was defeated by John McDonald. He contested for a seat in the Australian Senate in the elections of 31 May 1913 and 15 September 1914, but was unsuccessful. On 12 November 1915, he won the Legislative Assembly seat of Roebourne in a by-election called because of the still-unexplained abandonment of the seat by Joseph Gardiner. The by-election was a crucial one for John Scaddan's Labor government, with Butcher's win erasing its two-seat majority. He held the seat until the election of 18 October 1917, which he did not contest.

In 1904, the Butcher brothers bought Avondale Estate near Beverley. They expanded Avondale from 5,323 acres (21.54 km^{2}) to 9,635 acres (38.99 km^{2}) by purchasing surrounding properties. Four years later the brothers approached the government and offered to sell the land at £5/10/- per acre, the government counter-offered £5/5/- per acre. The brothers accepted this offer and in March 1910 the sale of Avondale occurred for the total price of £51,494/12/6.

In 1910 and 1911, Butcher was president of the WA Pastoralists Association. In 1900 he purchased Meeberrie Station north east of Geraldton, and later also became owner of Nangetty Station near Mingenew.

Little is known of Butcher's life after 1917. He died at Nedlands on 24 May 1944, and was buried in Karrakatta Cemetery.
