= Hamersley Station =

Pastoral lease in Western Australia

Coordinates: 22°17′00″S 117°59′00″E

Location in Western Australia

Hamersley or Hamersley Station is a pastoral lease and cattle station located between Tom Price and Pannawonica in the Pilbara region of Western Australia.

The iron ore mining group Rio Tinto manages the station along with several others. The station is owned by Hamersley Iron. The company holds the lease not only for grazing purposes but also to control access for exploration, development of infrastructure and future mining. Hamersley is operating under the Crown Lease number CL742-1993 and has the Land Act number LA3114/1277.

The station was once the home of iron ore magnate Lang Hancock.

== See also ==
- List of ranches and stations
