= Electoral district of Gascoyne =

Former electoral district in Western Australia

Gascoyne Western Australia—Legislative Assembly
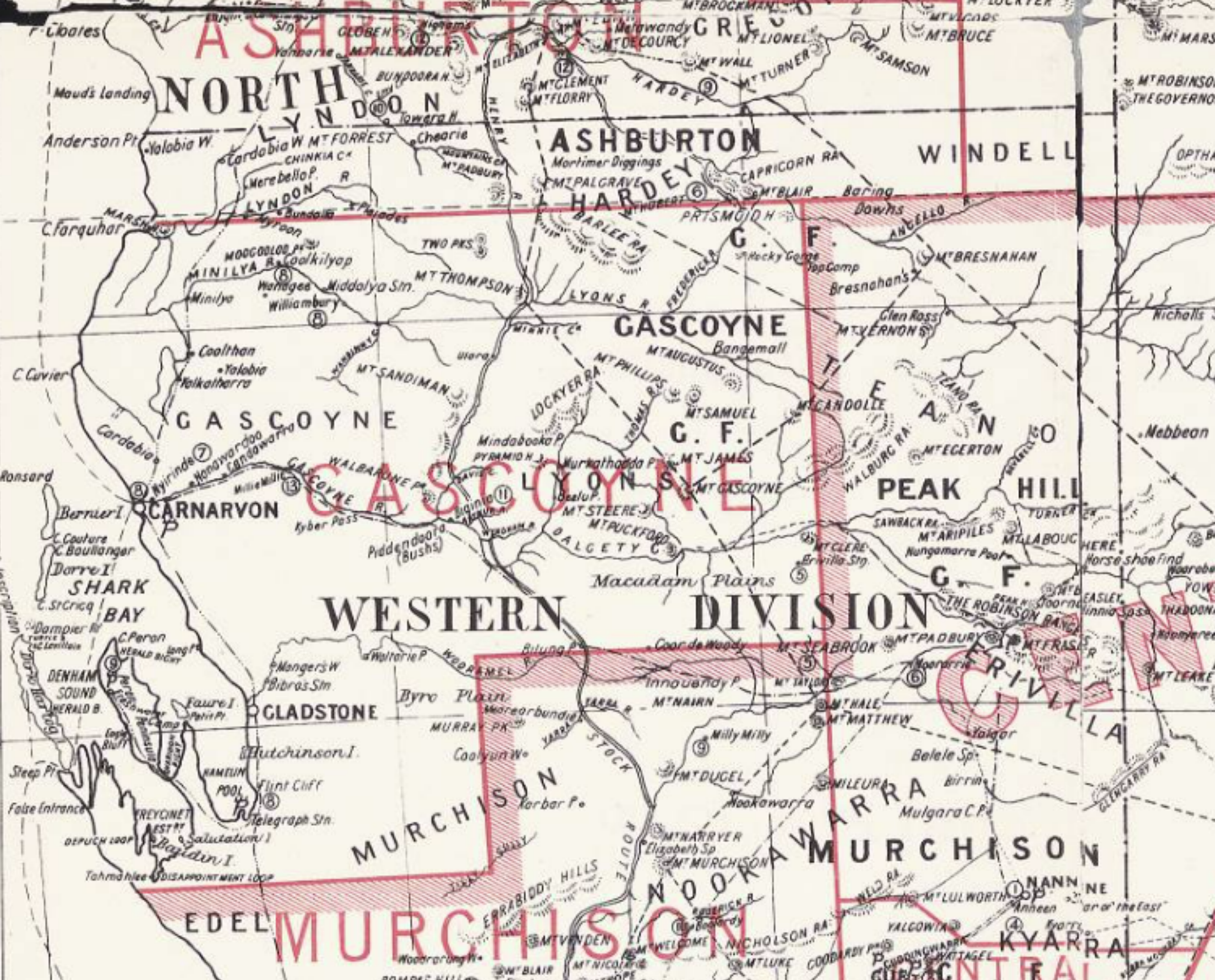
- Gascoyne and surrounds in 1898
- State: Western Australia
- Dates current: 1890–1989
- Namesake: Gascoyne region

Gascoyne was an electoral district of the Legislative Assembly in the Australian state of Western Australia from 1890 to 1989.

The district was located in the Western Australian outback, in the north-west of the state. It was one of the original 30 seats contested at the 1890 election. In 1898, its major settlement was Carnarvon and it also included some outlying pastoral leases like Middalya Station. The seat was abolished ahead of the 1989 election. In

The district's most famous member was Frank Wise of the Labor Party, who served as Premier of Western Australia from 1945 to 1947.

== Members for Gascoyne ==
Member	Party	Term
Robert Sholl	Opposition	1890–1897
George Hubble	Ministerial	1897–1901
William Butcher	Independent	1901–1905
William Butcher	Ministerial	1905–1911
John McDonald	Labor	1911–1914
Archibald Gilchrist	Liberal	1914–1917
Archibald Gilchrist	Nationalist	1917
Edward Angelo	Nationalist	1917–1920
Edward Angelo	Country	1920–1923
Edward Angelo	Country (MCP)	1923–1924
Edward Angelo	Nationalist	1924–1933
Frank Wise	Labor	1933–1951
Noel Butcher	Ind. Liberal	1951–1953
Daniel Norton	Labor	1953–1974
Ian Laurance	Liberal	1974–1987
Dudley Maslen	Liberal	1987–1989
