= Edward Angelo =

Australian politician (1870–1948)

Member of the Legislative Assembly of Western Australia
- In office 29 September 1917 – 8 April 1933
- Preceded by: Archibald Gilchrist
- Succeeded by: Frank Wise
- Constituency: Gascoyne

Member of the Legislative Council of Western Australia
- In office 22 May 1934 – 21 May 1940
- Preceded by: Sir Edward Wittenoom
- Succeeded by: Frank Welsh
- Constituency: North Province

Personal details
- Born: 29 July 1870 Jhansi, Gwalior State, India
- Died: 1 October 1948 (aged 78) Mount Lawley, Western Australia
- Party: Nationalist (to 1920); Country (1920–1924); Nationalist (from 1924)

Edward Houghton Angelo (29 July 1870 – 1 October 1948) was an Australian politician who served in both houses of the Parliament of Western Australia. He was a member of the Legislative Assembly from 1917 to 1933, representing the seat of Gascoyne, and then a member of the Legislative Council from 1934 to 1940, representing North Province.

== Early life ==
Angelo was born in Jhansi, in present-day Uttar Pradesh, India, (Note: At the time of Angelo's birth, the city of Jhansi was part of Gwalior State, a nominally sovereign princely state.) to Mary (née Colquhoun) and Edward Fox Angelo. He was sent to Australia to be educated, and initially attended the Hutchins School in Hobart, Tasmania. In 1882, his father, an army officer, was sent to Western Australia. Angelo joined him there, completing his education at The High School in Perth. After leaving school, he initially worked for the Public Works Department. He later transferred to the Treasury Department, working as a clerk, and in 1887 was posted to Roebourne.

In 1890, Angelo joined the Roebourne branch of the Union Bank. He returned to Perth in 1892, but in 1902 relocated to Carnarvon (the largest town of the Gascoyne region) to help open a new Union Bank branch. In 1907, Angelo left the bank and went into business on his own, eventually coming to hold commercial interests in Carnarvon and the surrounding region. He served on the Carnarvon Municipal Council for a number of years, including as mayor from 1910 to 1915.

== Politics and later life ==
Angelo was elected to parliament at the 1917 state election, standing for the Nationalist Party in the seat of Gascoyne. He defeated Archibald Gilchrist, the sitting member, by a large margin. Angelo switched to the Country Party in 1920, and won re-election as a Country Party candidate at the 1921 election. The Country Party split into two rival factions in 1923, with Angelo joining the Ministerial (or Government faction). He and several others joined the Nationalist Party after the 1924 election. Angelo was re-elected as a Nationalist in 1927 and 1930, winning with large majorities.

At the 1933 state election, Angelo was defeated in Gascoyne by a Labor candidate, Frank Wise, who was a future premier. He re-entered parliament at the 1934 Legislative Council election, winning election to North Province as the successor to Sir Edward Wittenoom. Angelo served a single six-year term in the Legislative Council before leaving parliament. He subsequently retired to Mount Lawley, a suburb of Perth, dying there in October 1948, aged 78. He had married Frances Mary Peirl in 1894, with whom he had three daughters.

== Notes ==
Parliament of Western Australia
| Preceded by Archibald Gilchrist | Member for Gascoyne; 1917–1933 | Succeeded by Frank Wise |
