= John McDonald (Western Australian politician) =

Australian politician

John James McDonald (21 July 1869 – 19 June 1934), Australian politician, was a Member of the Western Australian Legislative Assembly from 1911 to 1914.

Born in East Ballarat, Victoria on 21 July 1869, John McDonald was the son of cordial manufacturer Michael McDonald. He was educated at Christian Brothers College in East Melbourne, then spent three years raising stock for his father. In 1895 he emigrated to Western Australia, where he spent the next twelve years as a prospector. In 1908 he moved to Carnarvon, where he became involved in the labor movement. He became a member of the Australian Workers' Union, and on 21 October 1911 was elected to the Western Australian Legislative Assembly seat of Gascoyne for the Labor Party. He held the seat until the election of 4 November 1914, by which time he was living at Highgate.

McDonald returned to Victoria in 1914, joining the Liquor Trades Union and obtaining work in a soft drink factory. By January the following year he was the Union's Trades Hall representative, and was on the Committee of Management as the Aerated Waters representative. He became vice-president of the Victorian branch in December 1915, and president in December 1916. He remained president until January 1918. Thereafter he was assistant secretary of the union from July 1921 until his death on 19 June 1934. He died, unmarried, at Bacchus Marsh, Victoria
