= Electoral district of Roebourne =

Colonial/state electoral district of Western Australia

Roebourne Western Australia—Legislative Assembly
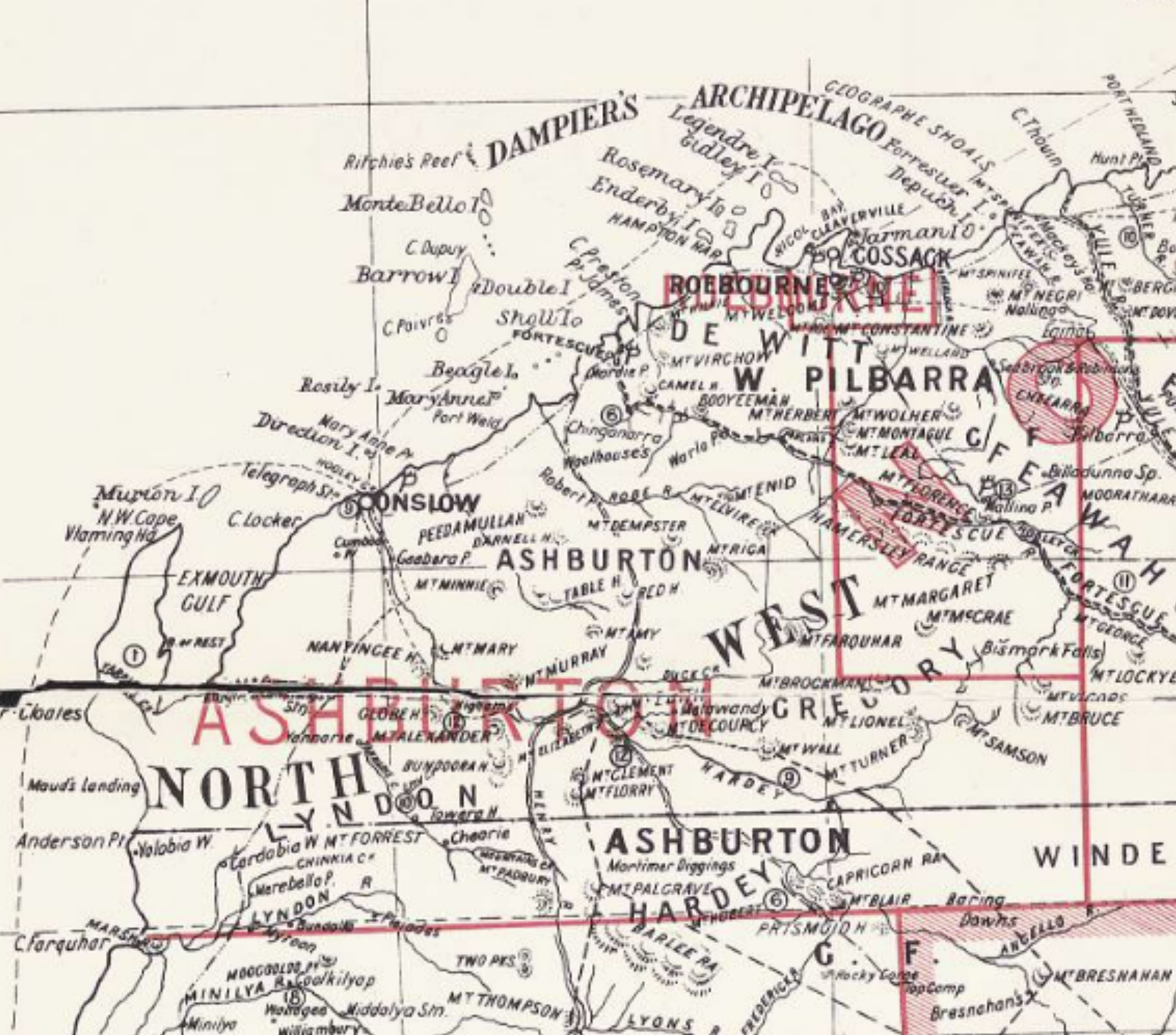
- Roebourne and surrounds in 1898
- State: Western Australia
- Dates current: 1890–1950
- Demographic: Pilbara

The Electoral district of Roebourne was a Legislative Assembly electorate in the state of Western Australia. It was named for the town of Roebourne and was created in 1890, being one of the original 30 seats contested at the 1890 colonial election. In 1898, the boundaries of the district did not extend far beyond the settlements of Roebourne and Cossack.

The seat was abolished in the 1948 redistribution under the Electoral Districts Act 1947, and was absorbed into the seat of Pilbara. Its final member, Aloysius Rodoreda, transferred successfully to the Pilbara seat at the election.

== Members for Roebourne ==
Member	Party	Term
George Leake	Non-aligned	1890
Horace Sholl	Ministerial	1891–1901
John Sydney Hicks	Ministerial	1901–1908
Henry Osborn	Ministerial	1908–1911
Joseph Gardiner	Labor	1911–1915
William Butcher	Liberal	1915–1917
William Butcher	Nationalist	1917
Frederick Teesdale	Nationalist	1917–1932
John Church	Nationalist	1932–1933
Aloysius Rodoreda	Labor	1933–1950
