= Roebourne, Western Australia =

Roebourne Yirramagardu (Ngarluma)
- Town
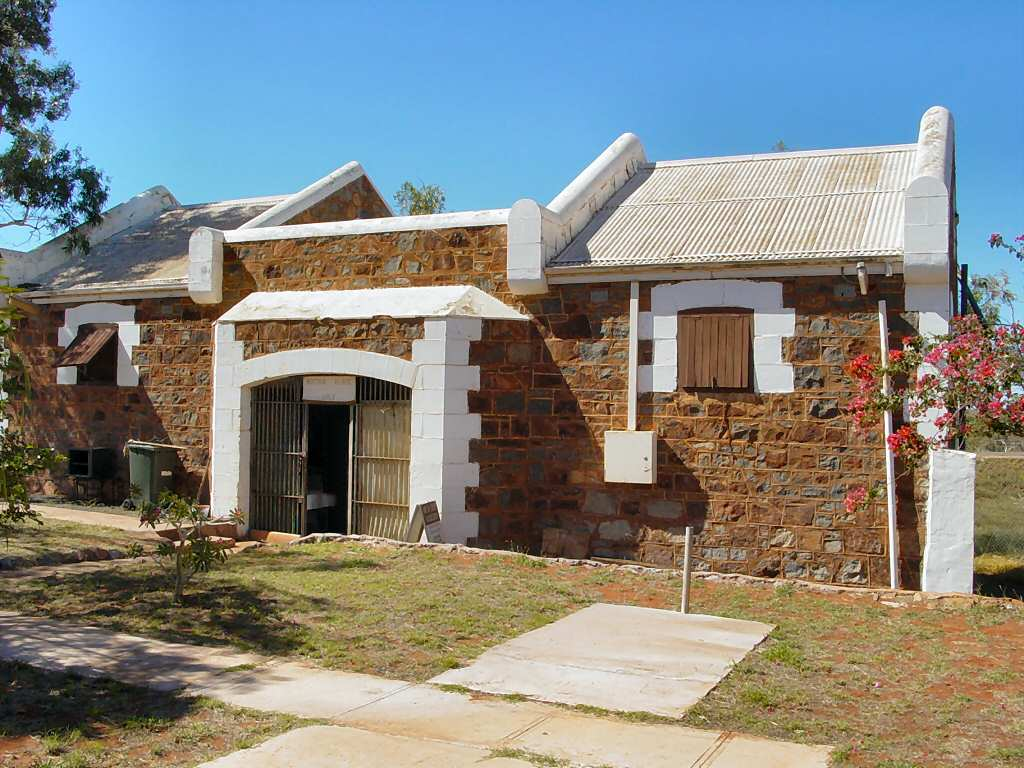
- Roebourne Tourist Centre (formerly the entrance to Roebourne Gaol)

- Interactive map of Roebourne
- Coordinates: 20°46′00″S 117°09′00″E
- Country: Australia
- State: Western Australia
- LGA: City of Karratha
- Location: 202 km (126 mi) from Port Hedland; 1,563 km (971 mi) from Perth; 38 km (24 mi) from Karratha
- Established: Proclaimed a township on 17 August 1866

Government
  - State electorate: Pilbara
  - Federal division: Durack

Area
  - Total: 175.8 km^{2} (67.9 sq mi)
- Elevation: 12 m (39 ft)

Population
  - Total: 700 (UCL 2021)
- Postcode: 6718
- Mean max temp: 34.0 °C (93.2 °F)
- Mean min temp: 20.5 °C (68.9 °F)
- Annual rainfall: 311.3 mm (12.26 in)

Roebourne /ˈroʊbərn/, also known by its Ngarluma name Ieramugadu (also spelled Yirramagardu), is a town in Western Australia's Pilbara region. It is 35 km from Karratha, 202 km from Port Hedland and 1,563 km from Perth, the state's capital. It is the only town on the North West Coastal Highway between Binnu and Fitzroy Crossing; over 2,000km. It is located within the City of Karratha. It prospered during its gold boom of the late 19th century and was once the largest settlement between Darwin and Perth. At the 2016 census, Roebourne and the surrounding area had a population of 981.

== Toponymy ==
Roebourne's name honours John Septimus Roe, the first Surveyor General of Western Australia.

The name Ieramugadu, also spelt Yirramagardu, is used by the local Aboriginal community to refer to the town. It is the Ngarluma word for a native fig (Ficus) species that is found in and around the area. Native figs are a food source for traditional owners. Archaeological evidence indicates human occupation of the area for over 40,000 years.

== History ==
Roebourne is on the traditional lands of the Ngarluma people, who have occupied the area for tens of thousands of years. Many Ngarluma people, alongside other traditional owner populations, continue to live in Roebourne, and continue to practise traditional law, culture and language. Ngarluma and Yindjibarndi people are represented by the Ngarluma and Yindjibarndi Foundation Ltd and their respective prescribed body corporates. Ngarluma people hold native title rights for the Roebourne area.

The Pilbara region was explored by Francis Thomas Gregory in 1861. He and his exploration party arrived at the head of Nickol Bay, landing near what was to become Roebourne, and travelling about 60 kilometres (40 mi) inland to present-day Millstream Station. Gregory regarded the area as highly suitable for pastoral settlement. The first British settlers, including Gregory's cousin Emma Withnell and her young family, arrived in the Roebourne area in 1863. The Withnells established themselves on the banks of the Harding River 13 km from the coast, where they had access to a reasonable fresh water supply, and took up 30,000 acres (120 km^{2}) at the foot of Mount Welcome. In common with many settlers at the time, they hired local Aboriginal people to work on their properties as shepherds, labourers and shearers.

By 1865, the population of the area had grown to about 200, and the Withnells' property served as a local hub, with John Withnell opening a store and providing cartage services to the other settlers. Prior to the construction of a church in the area, services were held in their home.

The government resident, Robert John Sholl, arrived in November 1865 from the failed Camden Harbour settlement (near Kuri Bay) to provide assistance in developing the region and set up camp near the Withnells' home while trying to find a suitable townsite. He eventually decided to locate the town at his camp and, on 17 August 1866, after surveyor Charles Wedge drew a draft plan consisting of 106 lots, Roebourne became the first gazetted town in the North West. It became the region's administrative centre and various government buildings, shops, services and hotels set up business. Sholl was justice of the peace, district registrar and magistrate, and he was concerned with the plight of the local Aboriginal people and made submissions to the Government to ensure they had basic rights.

Many European men located in Roebourne in the late 1800s were directly and indirectly perpetrators of the Flying Foam massacre committed on the Murujuga area against the Yaburrara people. There are streets in Roebourne that are still named after those connected with the atrocities, including Sholl Street.

In 1872, the town was destroyed by a cyclone. Many of the buildings from shortly after this time are heritage-listed. A number of the heritage buildings were the work of the eminent Public Works Department architect George Temple-Poole.

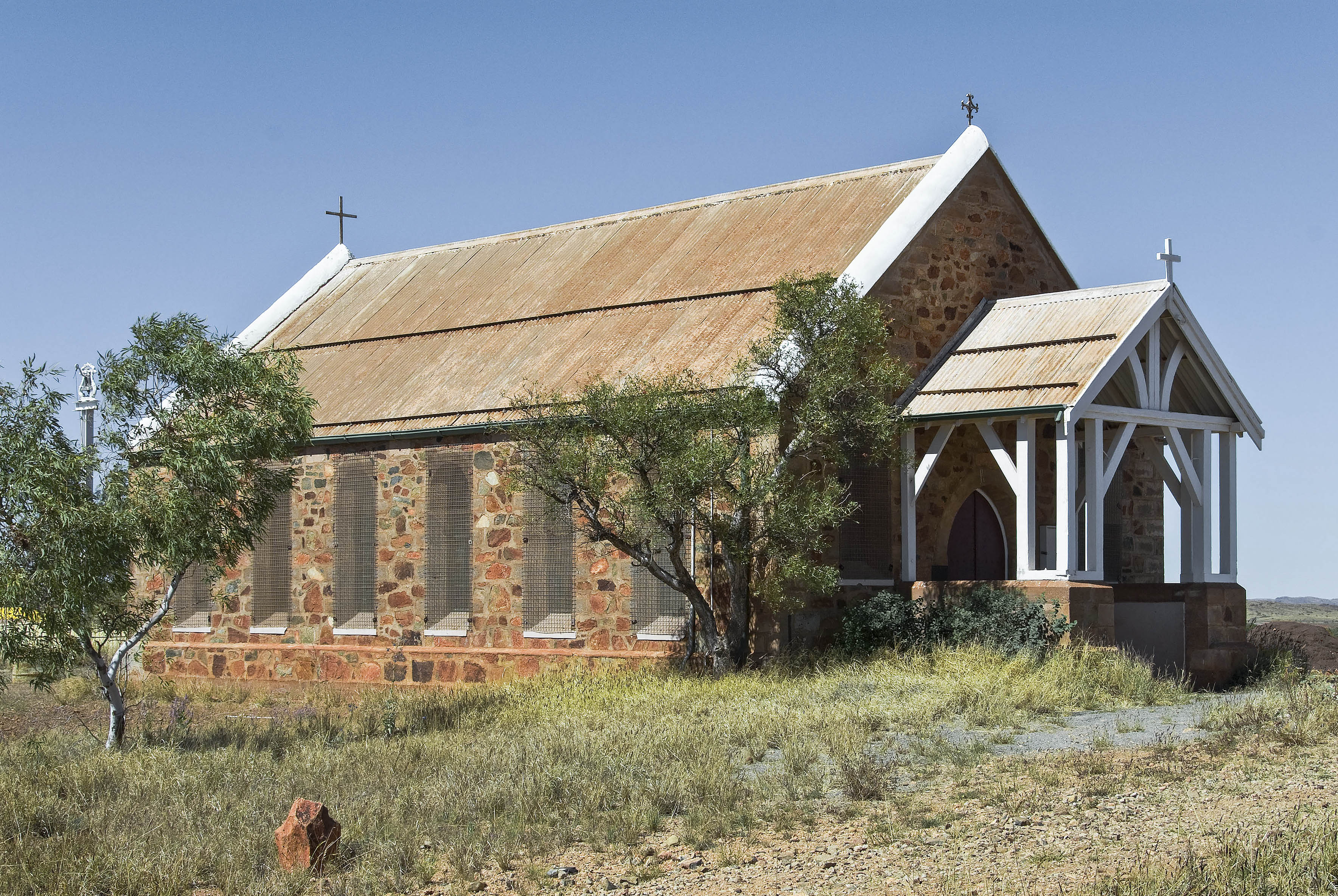
Holy Trinity Anglican Church (1883 / 1894–95)

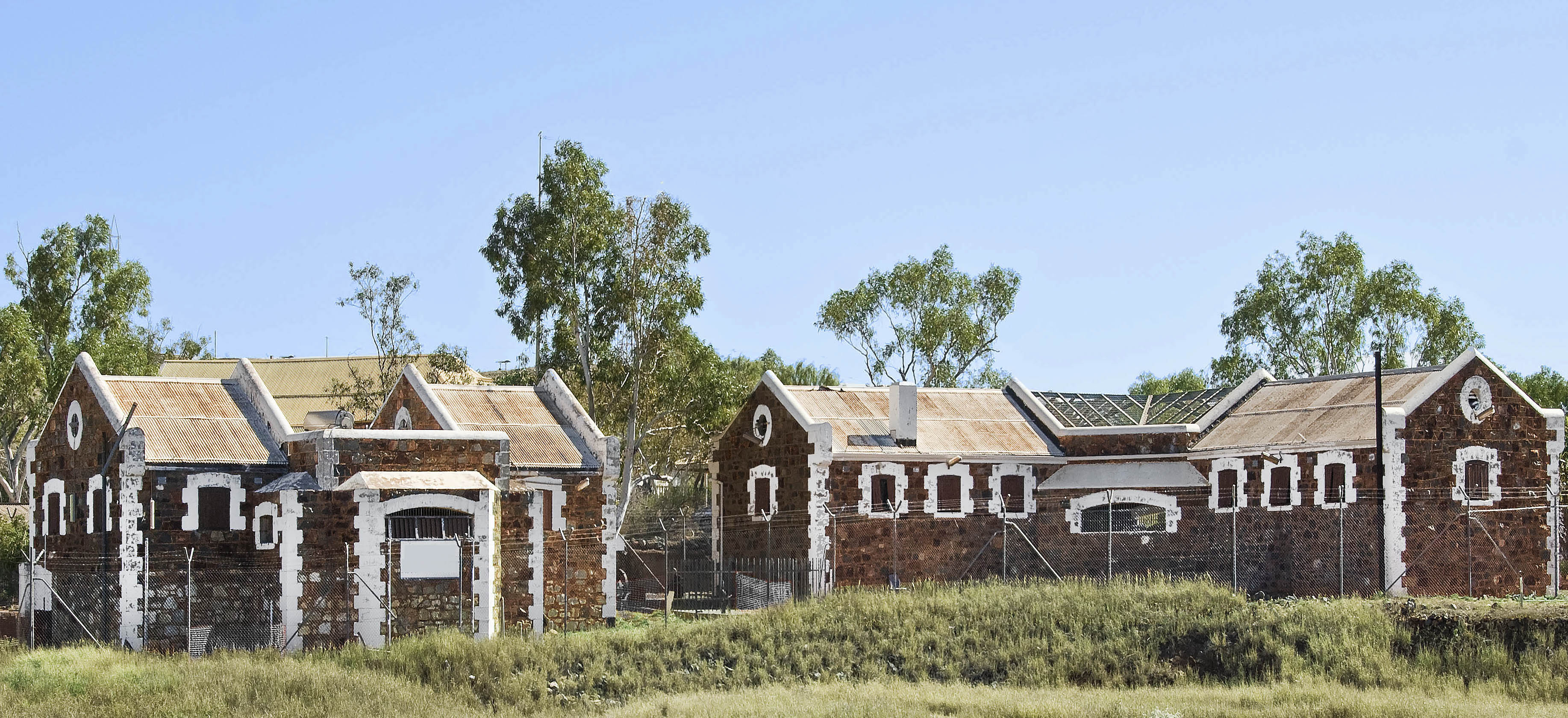
Former Roebourne Gaol by G Temple-Poole

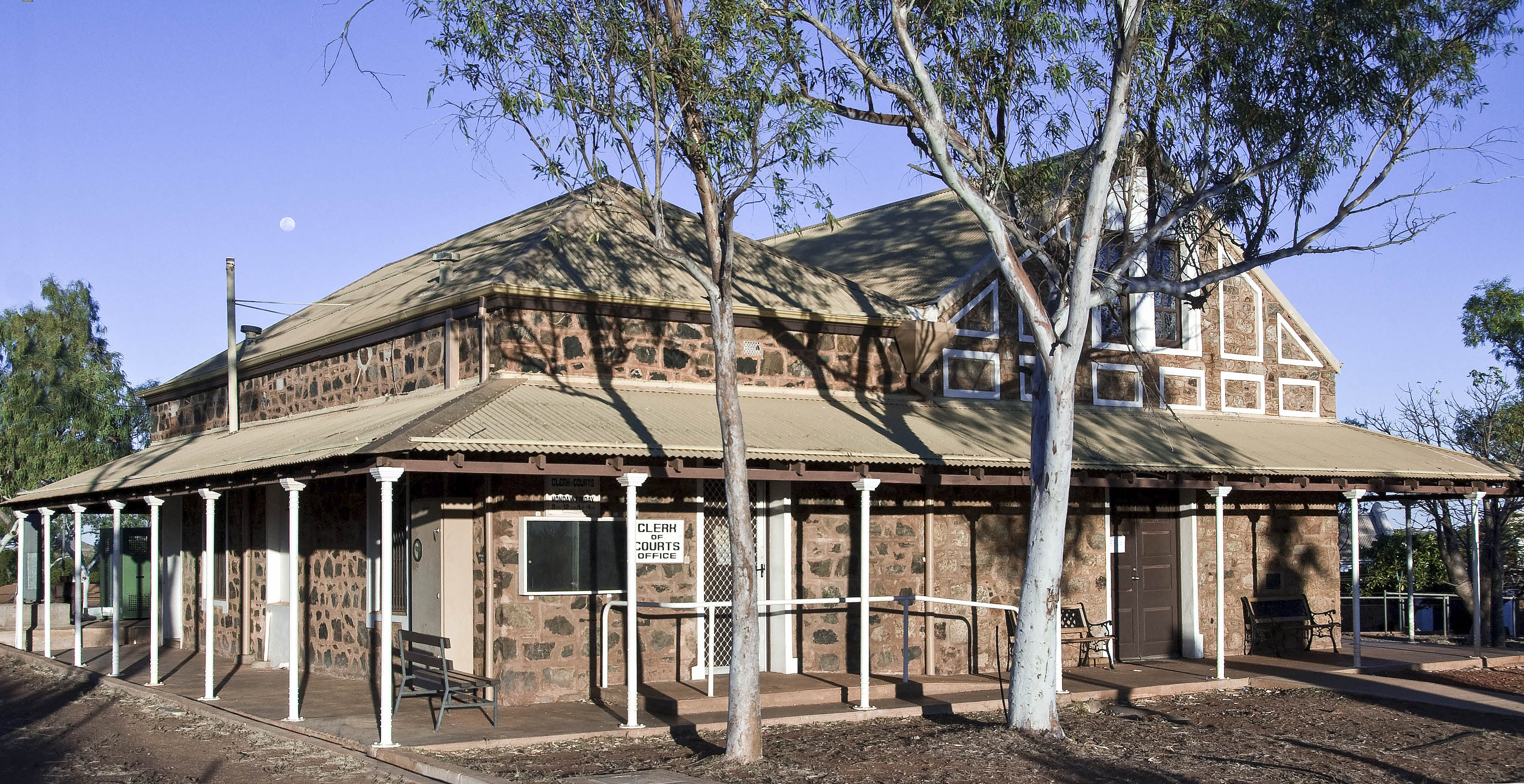
Roebourne Courthouse, G Temple Poole (1886)

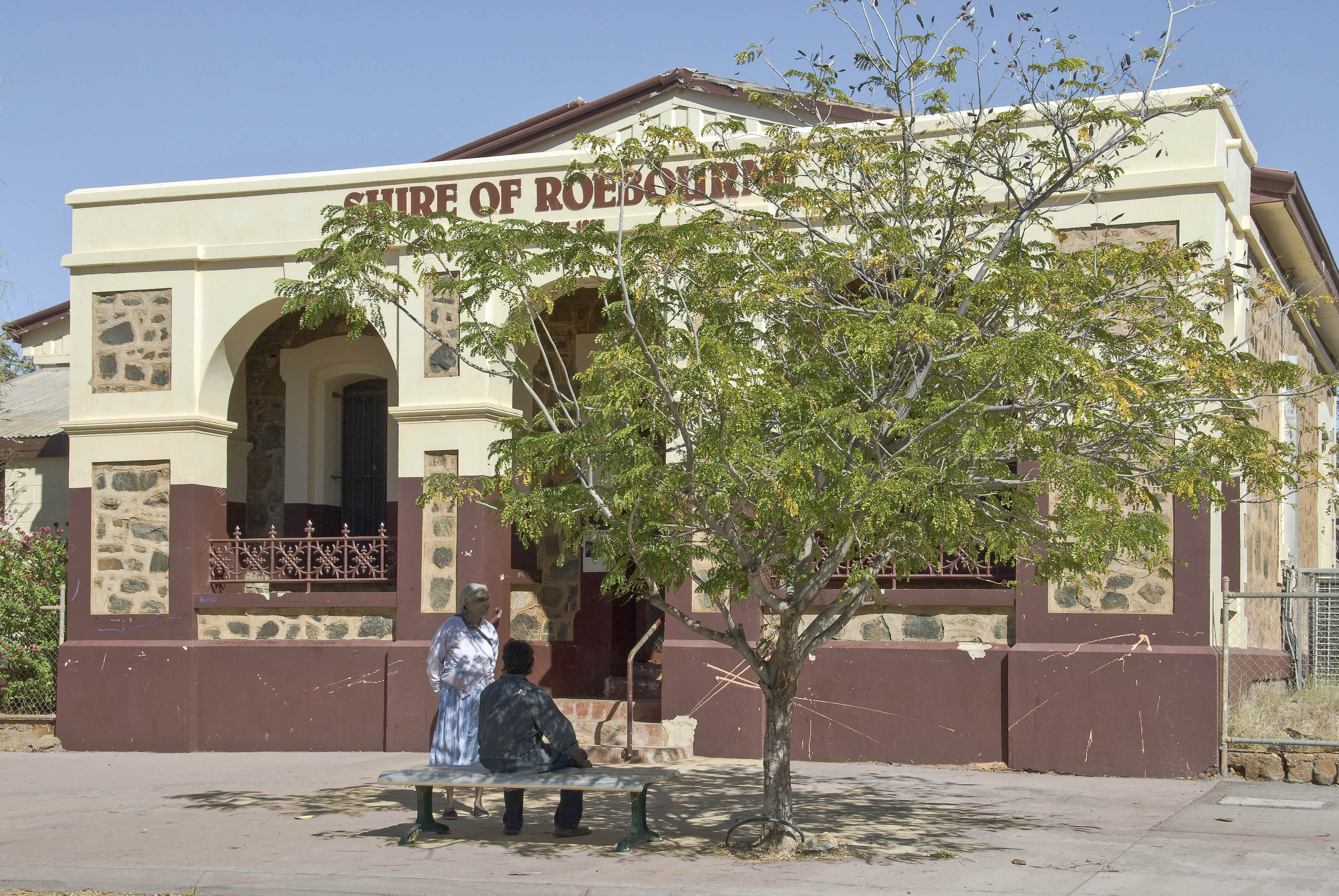
Former Roebourne Shire Offices (1888)

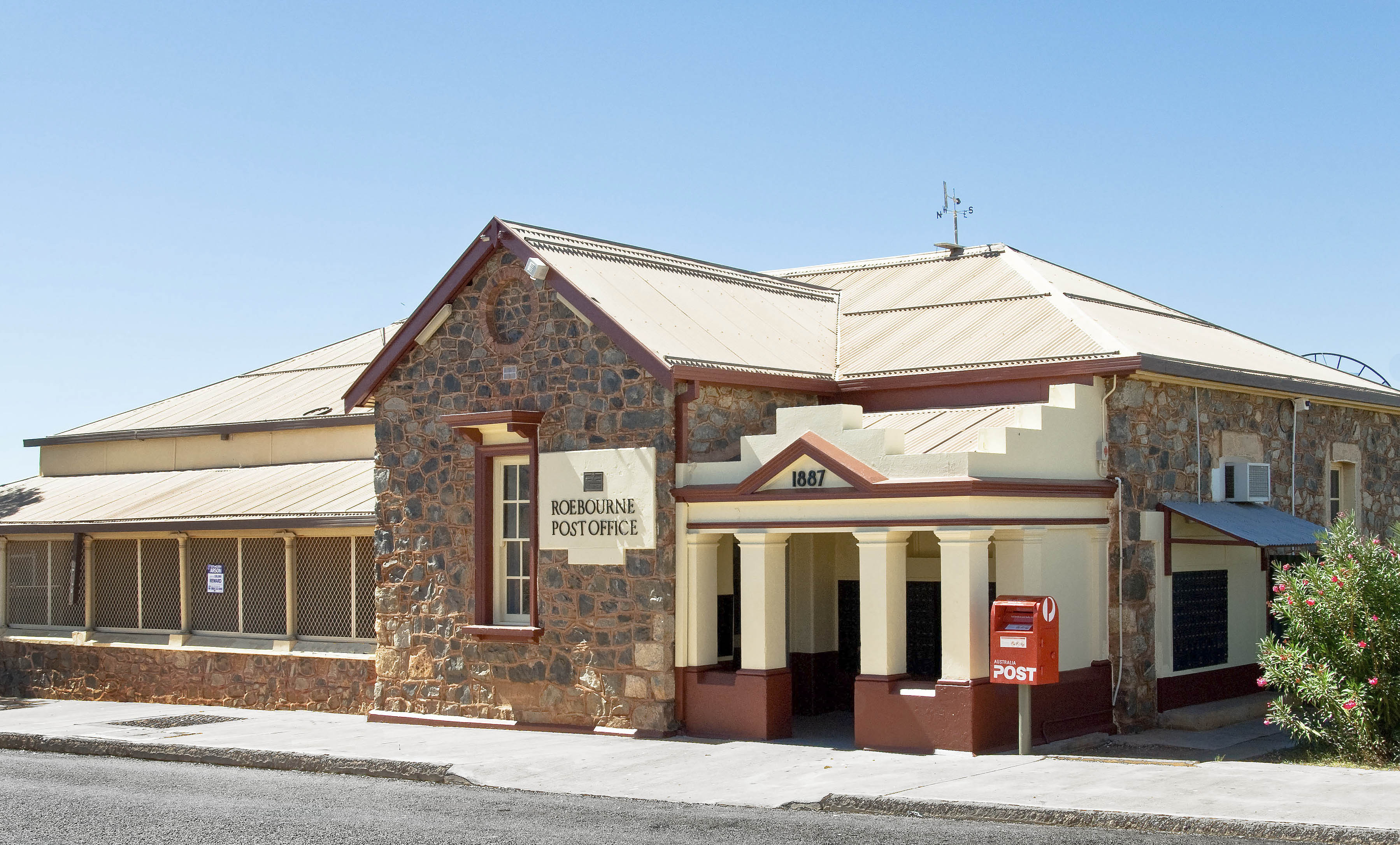
Roebourne Post Office by G. Temple-Poole, built by Bunning Bros (1887)

The Old Roebourne Gaol commenced construction in 1896, the stones being quarried and laid by Aboriginal prisoners who were detained there in extremely harsh conditions between 1896 and 1923. It was used again between 1975 and 1984 before the opening of a new Roebourne Regional Prison, which remains controversial as temperatures in the area can reach 50 °C (122 °F) and cells have no air-conditioning.

The site of the Withnells' house, which was rebuilt in 1937 by a later owner, is on Hampton Street at the foot of Mount Welcome.

Gold from Nullagine, discovered in 1878, and surrounding copper and tin mines contributed to Roebourne's prosperity in the 1880s and 1890s. With the decline of both, Roebourne lost the majority of its European population and became a shadow of its former self. Remnants from that era of prosperity are various National Trust buildings around the town.

The area was struck by another cyclone in 1925 that destroyed the Port Samson jetty and lifted the Pope's Nose bridge from the river bed. Several buildings were also destroyed with the town's residents seeking refuge in public brick buildings during the storm.

Until the 1960s, Roebourne was a non-Indigenous town operating as a regional administrative centre, with strict controls and curfews placed on movement of Aboriginal people to, from and within the town. Most Aboriginal people were confined to camps and reserves a few kilometres away. However, as mining companies seeking to exploit the iron ore in the region constructed other company towns such as Dampier and Wickham for their workers, and as pastoralism declined, and with changing attitudes to Aboriginal welfare at governmental level in the late 1960s, Roebourne became a majority Aboriginal town as people moved out of the crowded camps and reserves, and from the outlying stations.

In later years, Roebourne became notorious for the struggles between Aboriginal people and police that were documented in a federal report dealing with Aboriginal deaths in custody, which were documented as a major issue in Aboriginal affairs from the 1980s onwards. The report showed that Roebourne (with a largely Aboriginal population of 1,200) had ratios of police to citizens that were five times that of towns in more settled parts of Western Australia.

== Present day ==
Currently Roebourne serves the passing highway traffic and tourism, especially as the gateway to many national parks in the interior. The town's education needs are met by the Roebourne School (built in 1905), a K-12 school serving about 250 Aboriginal students. Roebourne also contains a TAFE campus, library and telecentre, as well as 3 tiny hospitals. Each no bigger than the size of a small house. Many other services are provided from Karratha, 40 km away.

The area is home to the Ngarluma people, but many Yindjibarndi and Banyjima people previously from outlying stations also live in the town.

The Ganalili Centre is an Aboriginal-owned cultural space. It is a reclamation of the Victoria Hotel, infamous for a 1983 incident where after a fight John Pat, a sixteen-year-old Yindjibarndi boy died in a police cell.

The Old Roebourne General Store, now known as the Ieramugadu Store Maya, is owned and operated by the Ngarluma Yindjibarndi Foundation Ltd (NYFL) as a ‘social supermarket’ alongside a social enterprise cafe, where local First Nations people undertake employment and training.

== Native Title ==
Roebourne town falls entirely within the Ngarluma People, recognised in Samson on behalf of the Ngarluma People v State of Western Australia [2015]. The determination, in the Pilbara region of Western Australia, recognised exclusive and non-exclusive native title rights and interests.

Many Yindjibarndi Native Title Common Law Holders reside in Roebourne, having been removed from traditional Yindjibarndi Country in the twentieth century, and forced to live in the Roebourne Old Reserve. Yindjibarndi people have been in a longstanding feud with Fortescue Metal Group, following Fortescue mining the Solomon Mine Hub on Yindjibarndi Country, without permission and consent from Yindjibarndi people. In March 2011, billionaire Andrew Forrest infamously led a meeting at the Roebourne 50 Cent Community Hall. The meeting became known as the 'Great Native Title Swindle' due to allegations Forrest paid Aboriginal people from other towns to come to the meeting to vote in favor of Fortescue's mining proposal. This meeting formed part of Yindjibarndi's successful Federal Court case against Forrest's Fortescue.

== Ngarluma Yindjibarndi Foundation Ltd ==
The Ngarluma Yindjibarndi Foundation Ltd (NYFL) is the main Traditional Owner (Aboriginal) organisation in Roebourne. NYFL is made up by two First Nations, the Ngarluma people and the Yindjibarndi people. The two nations came together in 1998 to form NYFL as the traditional owner representative organisation for the Roebourne area. NYFL is a party to the Land Access Agreement for the area on which the Woodside-operated North West Shelf project operates. However, NYFL does not receive royalties under this agreement. NYFL operates a low-cost nonprofit supermarket, workforce training, sport registration fees, and a direct cash assistance program for Ngarluma and Yindjibarndi members.

In 2018 NYFL entered voluntary administration, having accumulated a major tax debt under former CEO Evan Maloney. Maloney was replaced by Bruce Jorgensen, who was in turn removed in 2022 after losses to NYFL's commercial arm and the accumulation of significant tax liabilities. After restructuring, Sean-Paul Stephens was appointed by the board in order to rebuild the foundation and renegotiate land access and commercial agreements. By 2023, the NYFL returned to a strong financial position, enabling the foundation to make greater investment into Roebourne. NYFL has achieved record Aboriginal employment and training outcomes in the Roebourne area.

In 2024, NYFL entered into a partnership with the Australian National University, named Jila, meaning 'roots' in local language. a research partnership focused on Indigenous self-determination, community-led research and the integration of First Nations knowledge into research and education. The Jila research agenda focuses on Indigenous data sovereignty, truth-telling, social impact and sustainable development, with a particular emphasis on Roebourne and its surrounding communities. The partnership is also connected to the international Centre for Future Materials, seeking to strengthen First Nations participation and rights in the global transition to renewable energy.

In 2026, the Ngarluma Yindjibarndi Foundation (NYFL) was engaged in negotiations with Woodside Energy to modernise a 1998 Land Access Agreement associated with the North West Shelf gas project on Murujuga (Burrup Peninsula), 44km from Roebourne. SBS News obtained a copy of the 1998 Agreement and stated that the agreement does not provide for any royalty payments from the North West Shelf to Traditional Owners. Reporting stated that the original agreement provides funding for small community programs but does not include resource royalties. NYFL has advocated for an agreement that better reflects contemporary principles of Indigenous self-determination and delivers long-term economic, social and cultural benefits to the Ngarluma and Yindjibarndi communities. Woodside maintained that the existing partnership had delivered significant benefits and expressed its commitment to continuing negotiations. NYFL has stated that it wishes to direct compensation funds largely to support disadvantaged people across Roebourne and surrounds.

In October 2026, the OECD published a report that acknowledged NYFL Chair Michael Woodley and CEO Sean-Paul Stephens for their contribution to a reporting on strengthening Indigenous outcomes in OECD mining regions. The report used NYFL's Ieramugadu Store, as an example of First Nations-led responses to streghtnening communities in mining regions.The OECD reported that in 2023, NYFL redesigned the store's operating model around the Yindjibarndi principle of Nyinyart (reciprocity), extending its role beyond food security to support community wellbeing and cultural continuity.

The OECD report goes on to emphasise the Ieramugadu store as a significant employer of young Aboriginal people in Roebourne and supports the Birdirra Law ceremony by providing food, water and supplies for participants and ceremonial gifting, known as Gamari.

In late 2026, NYFL CEO Sean-Paul Stephens and the NYFL Board announced that the transition to a Traditional Owner CEO, the first in NYFL's history, was underway.

== In the arts ==
Ieramugadu is the location of collaborative projects initiated by Big hART, with the 2011-2015 project Yijala Yala leading to the creation of a successful interactive comic book Neomad, along with films, theatre productions, and exhibitions. A legacy project, called New Roebourne, continues, developing workshops, performances, video, and music programs. In 2021-22 it delivered five project streams, including NEO-Learning, an education platform suitable for primary schools, with digital content created by Roebourne children. Big Hart has been supported by Fortescue and Woodside Energy, amongst others mining, oil and gas projects.

The 2020 NITV / ABC Me series Thalu, produced by local producers Tyson Mowarin and Robyn Marais of Weerianna Street Media, in association with the ACTF, involved extensive community collaboration, and local children and elders feature in the series.

== Environment and climate ==
The Harding River runs through the town of Roebourne. The river runs to the Indian Ocean at the tourism site of Cossack. The Cossack townsite is managed by the NYFL. The Harding River flowed to a much greater extent prior to the construction of the Harding Dam. Today, the river is a series of waterholes, including at the Roebourne townsite.

The highest temperature ever measured in the town was 50.5 °C (122.9 °F) on 13 January 2022, it being one of three towns in Western Australia to exceed 50 °C (122 °F) that day. As of 2026, Roebourne is one of only six places in Australia that has formally reached 50 °C (122 °F). Yindjibarndi Elder Lyn Cheedy has advocated for Roebourne residents, many of whom are in social housing without air-conditioning, despite being located in one of the wealthiest regions in the country. Cheedy stated that social housing, such as her own, is often overcrowded, with as many as 16 people living in her home at times.

Climate data for Roebourne, WA
Month	Jan	Feb	Mar	Apr	May	Jun	Jul	Aug	Sep	Oct	Nov	Dec	Year
Record high °C (°F)	50.5 (122.9)	49.1 (120.4)	48.1 (118.6)	43.4 (110.1)	39.6 (103.3)	35.7 (96.3)	34.8 (94.6)	37.9 (100.2)	42.1 (107.8)	45.9 (114.6)	47.4 (117.3)	49.5 (121.1)	50.5 (122.9)
Mean daily maximum °C (°F)	38.7 (101.7)	38.0 (100.4)	37.6 (99.7)	35.3 (95.5)	30.4 (86.7)	27.0 (80.6)	26.8 (80.2)	29.0 (84.2)	32.6 (90.7)	35.6 (96.1)	38.0 (100.4)	39.0 (102.2)	34.0 (93.2)
Mean daily minimum °C (°F)	26.2 (79.2)	26.2 (79.2)	25.3 (77.5)	22.2 (72.0)	18.3 (64.9)	15.3 (59.5)	13.6 (56.5)	14.5 (58.1)	16.8 (62.2)	19.6 (67.3)	22.6 (72.7)	24.9 (76.8)	20.5 (68.9)
Record low °C (°F)	18.6 (65.5)	18.3 (64.9)	16.8 (62.2)	13.1 (55.6)	9.4 (48.9)	7.6 (45.7)	4.4 (39.9)	6.4 (43.5)	7.8 (46.0)	11.1 (52.0)	14.1 (57.4)	16.9 (62.4)	4.4 (39.9)
Average precipitation mm (inches)	59.9 (2.36)	68.1 (2.68)	64.4 (2.54)	28.7 (1.13)	27.8 (1.09)	28.8 (1.13)	13.8 (0.54)	5.0 (0.20)	1.4 (0.06)	0.7 (0.03)	1.5 (0.06)	11.0 (0.43)	311.3 (12.26)
Average precipitation days	3.5	4.9	3.5	1.5	2.5	2.6	1.6	0.9	0.3	0.3	0.3	1.2	23.1
Source: The Bureau of Meteorology

== See also ==
- Electoral district of Roebourne (1890–1950)
- List of extreme temperatures in Australia
