= List of newspapers in Australia =

This is a list of newspapers in Australia. The Sydney Morning Herald is the most-read newspaper in Australia, with over eight million readers as of 2021.

== Top 10 newspapers by circulation ==
The following is a list of the top 10 newspapers in Australia by average paid print circulation in 2018.

Newspaper	Primary service area	Headquarters	Format	Circulation	Owner	Masthead
Herald Sun	Melbourne; Victoria	Southbank	Tabloid	603,658	News Corp Australia	
The Daily Telegraph	Sydney; New South Wales	Surry Hills	Tabloid	526,216 (Note: Including figures of The Sunday Telegraph.)	News Corp Australia	
The Courier-Mail	Brisbane; Queensland	Bowen Hills	Tabloid	384,699 (Note: Including figures of The Sunday Mail.)	News Corp Australia	
The West Australian	Western Australia	Osborne Park	Tabloid	335,369	Seven West Media	
The Age	Melbourne; Victoria	Melbourne CBD	Compact	308,752	Nine Entertainment	
The Australian	National	Surry Hills	Broadsheet	303,809	News Corp Australia	
The Advertiser	Adelaide; South Australia	Adelaide CBD	Tabloid	272,310 (Note: Including figures of Sunday Mail.)	News Corp Australia	
The Sydney Morning Herald	Sydney; New South Wales	North Sydney	Compact	231,232	Nine Entertainment	
The Sunday Times	Perth; Western Australia	Osborne Park	Tabloid	168,432	Seven West Media	
Australian Financial Review	National	North Sydney	Compact	86,550	Nine Entertainment	

=== Other major metropolitan mastheads ===
Newspaper	Primary service area	Headquarters	Format	Owner
The Canberra Times	Canberra; Australian Capital Territory	Canberra	Tabloid	Australian Community Media
The Mercury	Hobart; Tasmania	Hobart	Tabloid	News Corp Australia
Northern Territory News	Darwin; Northern Territory	Darwin	Tabloid	News Corp Australia
Sunday Age	Melbourne; Victoria	Melbourne CBD	Tabloid	Nine Entertainment
Sunday Herald Sun	Melbourne; Victoria	Southbank	Tabloid	News Corp Australia
Sunday Mail	Adelaide; South Australia	Adelaide CBD	Tabloid	News Corp Australia
The Sunday Mail	Brisbane; Queensland	Bowen Hills	Tabloid	News Corp Australia
The Sunday Tasmanian	Hobart; Tasmania	Hobart	Tabloid	News Corp Australia
The Sunday Telegraph	Sydney; New South Wales	Surry Hills	Tabloid	News Corp Australia
Sunday Territorian	Darwin; Northern Territory	Darwin	Tabloid	News Corp Australia
The Sun-Herald	Sydney; New South Wales	North Sydney	Tabloid	Nine Entertainment
The Weekend Australian	National	Surry Hills	Broadsheet	News Corp Australia

== National ==
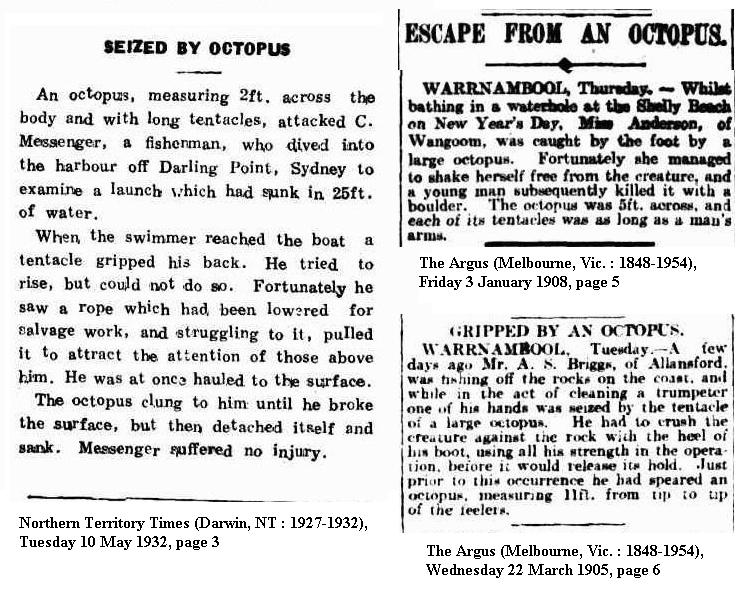
Octopus attacks described in old Australian newspapers

In 1950, the number of national daily newspapers in Australia was 54 and it increased to 65 in 1965.

=== Daily newspapers ===
- The Australian (broadsheet)
- The Australian Financial Review (no longer published in Western Australia)
- The Guardian Australia (online only)
- The New Daily (online only)

=== Weekly newspapers ===
- The Saturday Paper
- The Weekly Times

=== Bi-weekly and monthly newspapers ===
- Koori Mail, bi-weekly
- Nichigo Press national edition, monthly, Japanese
- Red Flag, bi-weekly
- Green Left, bi-weekly

== New South Wales ==
=== Sydney newspapers ===
There are many newspapers published in New South Wales, serving both the capital, Sydney, and the regions. Some newspapers are defunct; some have been renamed; some have been amalgamated. The two main Sydney newspapers are The Sydney Morning Herald, which was founded in 1831, and The Daily Telegraph, founded in 1879.

=== Regional newspapers ===
- Newcastle Weekly (2015– )

Broken Hill, though a city in New South Wales, has significant historical connections to South Australia.

- Barrier Daily Truth (1908–2024)
  - The Barrier Truth (1898–1908) - predecessor
- The Barrier Miner (1888–1974)
- The Barrier Weekly Post (1898–November 1898)
- Parra News (Free)
- The Western Weekender (Free)

=== Newspapers in languages other than English ===
There are also many current and past newspapers serving local communities in New South Wales that are published in languages other than English.

== Victoria ==
=== Statewide newspapers ===
- VicNews

=== Melbourne newspapers ===
- The Age (tabloid daily)
- Epoch Times (broadsheet Chinese weekly, subscription English weekly)
- Vision China Times (Chinese weekly)
- Herald Sun (tabloid daily)
- Leader Community Newspaper group publishes 20 local news titles covering metropolitan Melbourne
- Melbourne Observer (tabloid weekly)
- Sameway Magazine (Chinese weekly)
- The Australian Jewish News (weekly)
- Viet Times (Vietnamese weekly)
- Il Globo (bi-weekly, Italian)

=== Regional newspapers ===
- The Advertiser (Bairnsdale)
- Alexandra, Eildon, Marysville Standard
- Ararat Advertiser
- Armstrong Creek Times
- Bacchus Marsh Express
- Ballarat News
- Ballarat Times News Group
- The Bellarine Times
- Benalla Ensign
- Bendigo Advertiser
- The Bendigo Times
- The Bendigo Weekly Merged with Bendigo Advertiser in 2019.
- The Border Mail (Wodonga)
- Brimbank Weekly
- The Camperdown Chronicle
- Casterton News
- Castlemaine Mail
- The Chronicle (Wangaratta)
- Cobram Courier
- Cohuna Farmer's Weekly
- Colac Herald
- Corryong Courier
- Country News (Shepparton)
- The Courier (Ballarat)
- Daylesford Advocate
- Dimboola Banner
- The Echo
- Euroa Gazette
- The Free Press
- The Geelong Advertiser
- The Geelong Times
- The Geelong News
- The Gippsland Times (Sale, Maffra and surrounding areas)
- Girgarre Gazette
- The Golden Plans Times (Golden Plans Shire)
- The Guardian (Swan Hill)
- Hamilton Spectator
- Healesville and Yarra Glen Guardian
- The Horsham Times
- Kyabram Free Press
- Latrobe Valley Express (Latrobe Valley and surrounding areas)
- Maryborough & Dunolly Advertiser
- Midland Express
- The Miner (Ballarat to Winchelsea)
- The Moe and Narracan News
- Moorabool News
- Mortlake Dispatch
- Morwell Advertiser
- Morwell and Yinnar Gazette
- Mount Wycheproof Ensign
- Murchison Advertiser
- Myrtleford Mail and Whorouly Witness
- Nagambie Times
- Narracan Shire Advocate
- Nathalia Herald
- Nhill Free Press
- The McIvor Times
- The North Central Review
- Ovens and Murray Advertiser
- Port Fairy Gazette
- The Portland Observer
- Riponshire Advocate
- Riverine Herald (Echuca)
- Rochester Express
- Romsey Express
- Rosedale Courier
- Rupunyup Spectator and Lubeck, Banyena, Rich Avon, and Lallat Advertiser
- Rutherglen Sun
- Shepparton Advertiser
- Shepparton News
- Snowy River Mail
- South Gippsland Voices Newspaper
- Sunraysia Daily (Mildura)
- Star News (South East Suburbs)
- The Surfcoast Times (Surfcoast Shire)
- The Tarrangower Times
- The Traralgon Journal
- The Walhalla Chronicle and Moondarra Advertiser
- Wangaratta Chronicle
- The Warragul & Drouin Gazette
- The Warragul Citizen
- The Warrnambool Standard
- The Weekly Times
- The Whittlesea Review
- Yea Chronicle

== Queensland ==
=== Brisbane newspapers ===
- Brisbane News (free weekly magazine)
- Brisbane Times (online)
- The Courier-Mail (tabloid)
- The Catholic Leader (Brisbane)
- The Epoch Times (Broadsheet Chinese weekly, Subscription English weekly)
- Newsbytes (online)
- Queensland Asian Business Weekly (Chinese weekly)
- Queensland Country Life (published in Brisbane for Queensland rural readers)
- Sameway Magazine (Chinese weekly)

=== Brisbane community newspapers ===
- The Independent
- Quest Community Newspapers (city and suburban editions)
- The Reporter
- The Westerner
- Westside News
- Wynnum Herald
- Brisbane Indian Times

=== Regional newspapers ===
- Albert & Logan News
- Ayr Advocate
- Balonne Beacon
- Beaudesert Times
- The Border Post (Stanthorpe)
- Bowen Independent
- Bundaberg NewsMail
- Caboolture Shire Herald
- Cairns Bulletin
- Cairns Newspapers
- Cairns Northern News
- The Cairns Post
- Cairns Sun
- The Canungra Times
- The Capricornian
- The Central & North Burnett Times
- Central Queensland News (Emerald)
- Central Queensland Today (Rockhampton)
- The Charleville Courier
- Chinchilla News and Murilla Advertiser
- The Chronicle
- Cooktown Local News
- The Daily Mercury
- Darling Downs Gazette
- The Evening Advocate
- The Gladstone Observer
- Gold Coast Bulletin
- Gold Coast Mail
- Gold Coast Sun
- Goondiwindi Argus
- Gympie Life
- Gympie Times
- Herbert River Express
- Hinterland Times
- Home Hill Observer
- Innisfail Advocate
- The Ipswich Herald and General Advertiser
- Ipswich News
- The Kuranda Paper
- Logan West Leader
- Longreach Leader
- The Maryborough Sun (Maryborough)
- The Morning Bulletin (Rockhampton)
- The Noosa Journal
- MacIntyre Gazette
- Moreton Daily News
- Noosa News
- The National Tribune
- Northern Herald (former Millstream Times)
- The Northern Miner (Charters Towers)
- Northern Times
- Pine Rivers Press
- Port Douglas and Mossman Gazette
- The Queensland Times (Ipswich)
- Redcliffe & Bayside Herald
- Redland City Bulletin
- South Burnett Times (Kingaroy)
- Southern Herald
- Sunshine Coast Daily
- Tablelander
- Tablelands Advertiser
- The Weekend Post
- The Whitsunday Times
- Toowoomba Chronicle
- Torres News
- Townsville Bulletin
- Townsville Sun
- Warwick Daily News
- Western Cape Bulletin
- The Western Star and Roma Advertiser
- Whitsunday Coast Guardian formerly The Proserpine Guardian and The Guardian
- Tropic Now
- The Coastal Rag (Discovery Coast, Queensland)

== Western Australia ==
=== Perth newspapers ===
- Countryman
- Fremantle Herald
- Subiaco Post
- The Sunday Times
- WA Business News
- The West Australian
- Great Southern Weekender
- WAtoday (online only)

=== Regional newspapers ===
- Albany Advertiser
- Avon Advocate
- Broome Advertiser
- The Bunbury Herald
- Bunbury Mail
- Busselton-Dunsborough Mail
- Busselton-Margaret Times
- Capes Herald
- Coolgardie Miner
- Darlington Review
- Esperance Express
- Echo Newspapers
- Geraldton Guardian
- Gnowangerup Star (defunct)
- Golden Age (Coolgardie daily)
- Goldfield Courier (Coolgardie)
- Goldfields Express (Goldfields region)
- Great Southern Herald (Katanning)
- Harvey Reporter
- Kalgoorlie Miner
- Kimberley Echo (Kununurra)
- Kimberley Times (Derby)
- Mandurah Coastal Times
- Mandurah Mail
- Manjimup-Bridgetown Times
- Midwest Times
- Mundaring Magazine
- Murray Mail (Pinjarra)
- Narrogin Observer
- North West Telegraph (Port Hedland)
- Northern Guardian (Carnarvon)
- The Northern Times (Carnarvon, W.A.)
- Northern Valleys News NV News (Northern Valleys – Bindoon, Bullsbrook, Calingiri, Cervantes, Chittering, Dandaragan, Dalwallinu, Gingin, Jurien Bay, Lancelin, Muchea, Moora, New Norcia, Wongan Hills, Wannamal, Yerecoin)
- Pilbara Echo (Karratha, Dampier, Port Hedland)
- Pilbara News (Karratha)
- Pinjarra Murray Times (Pinjarra)
- Sound Telegraph (Rockingham)
- South Western Times (Bunbury)
- Southern Avon Chronicle (Northam, York)

== South Australia ==
=== Adelaide ===
- The Advertiser (tabloid)
- InDaily (online only)
- Messenger Newspapers
- Sameway Magazine (Chinese weekly)
- Stock Journal (statewide)
- The Southern Cross (Catholic weekly newspaper, now monthly)
- Sunday Mail (tabloid)

=== Regional newspapers ===
- The Border Chronicle (Bordertown)
- The Border Times (Pinnaroo)
- The Border Watch (Mount Gambier)
- The Bunyip (Gawler)
- Burra Broadcaster (Burra)
- Coastal Leader (Kingston SE)
- The Courier (Mount Barker)
- The Eyre Peninsula Tribune (Cleve)
- The Flinders News (Port Pirie)
- Gibber Gabber
- Herald (Tanunda)
- The Islander (Kingscote)
- The Leader (Barossa Valley)
- The Loxton News (Loxton)
- The Murray Pioneer (Renmark)
- The Murray Valley Standard (Murray Bridge)
- The Naracoorte Herald (Naracoorte)
- The Northern Argus (Clare Valley)
- On the Coast (Victor Harbor)
- The Pennant (Penola)
- The Plains Producer (Balaklava)
- The Port Lincoln Times (Port Lincoln)
- The Quorn Mercury (Quorn, Flinders Ranges)
- The Recorder (Port Pirie)
- The River News (Waikerie)
- The Southern Argus (Strathalbyn)
- South Eastern Times (Millicent)
- The Times (Victor Harbor)
- The Transcontinental (Port Augusta)
- Victor Harbor Times (Victor Harbor)
- The West Coast Sentinel (Ceduna)
- The Whyalla News (Whyalla)
- Yorke Peninsula Country Times (Kadina)

== Tasmania ==
=== Hobart newspapers ===
- The Mercury
- The Sunday Tasmanian

=== Regional newspapers ===
- The Advocate (Burnie)
- Circular Head Chronicle (Smithton)
- The Examiner (Launceston)
- The Gazette (New Norfolk)
- Huon Valley News (Franklin)
- The North Coast Post (Meander Valley)
- The Independent (Launceston)
- Kingborough Chronicle (Kingborough)
- North-Eastern Advertiser (Scottsdale)
- Tasmanian Country (Hobart)
- Sorell Times (Sorell)
- Tasman Gazette (Tasman peninsula)
- East Coast View (East coast)
- Hobart Observer (Hobart)
- Glenorchy Gazette (Glenorchy)
- Eastern Shore Sun (Eastern shore)
- Western Echo (West & Northwest Tasmania)

== Northern Territory ==
=== Darwin newspapers ===
- Darwin Sun
- Northern Territory News (1952–present)
- Palmerston Sun

=== Regional newspapers ===
- Alice Springs News
- Arafura Times
- Centralian Advocate
- Eylandt Echo
- Katherine Times
- Litchfield Times
- Top End Review
- Wagaitear

== Australian Capital Territory ==
- Canberra Weekly
- Canberra City News
- Canberra Illustrated: A Quarterly Magazine
- The Canberra Times
- The Federal Capital Pioneer
- The Good Neighbour
- The RIOT ACT

== See also ==
- Jschool
- List of magazines in Australia
- List of student newspapers in Australia
- Mass media in Australia
- List of newspapers in USA
- List of newspapers in Britain
- List of magazines in Britain
