= List of non-English-language newspapers in New South Wales =

This is a list of newspapers published in New South Wales, Australia, in Languages other than English (LOTE). It reflects the many people who have migrated to this part of the world. According to the 2011 Census, 22.5% of the population speak a language other than English at home and 31.4% of the population were born overseas. More than 160 languages, as well as English, are spoken at home in Australia.

The publication of the Australian indigenous people is not listed because their community newspaper, the fortnightly Koori Mail founded in 1991, is in English, which may be due to the fact that different groups have different languages.

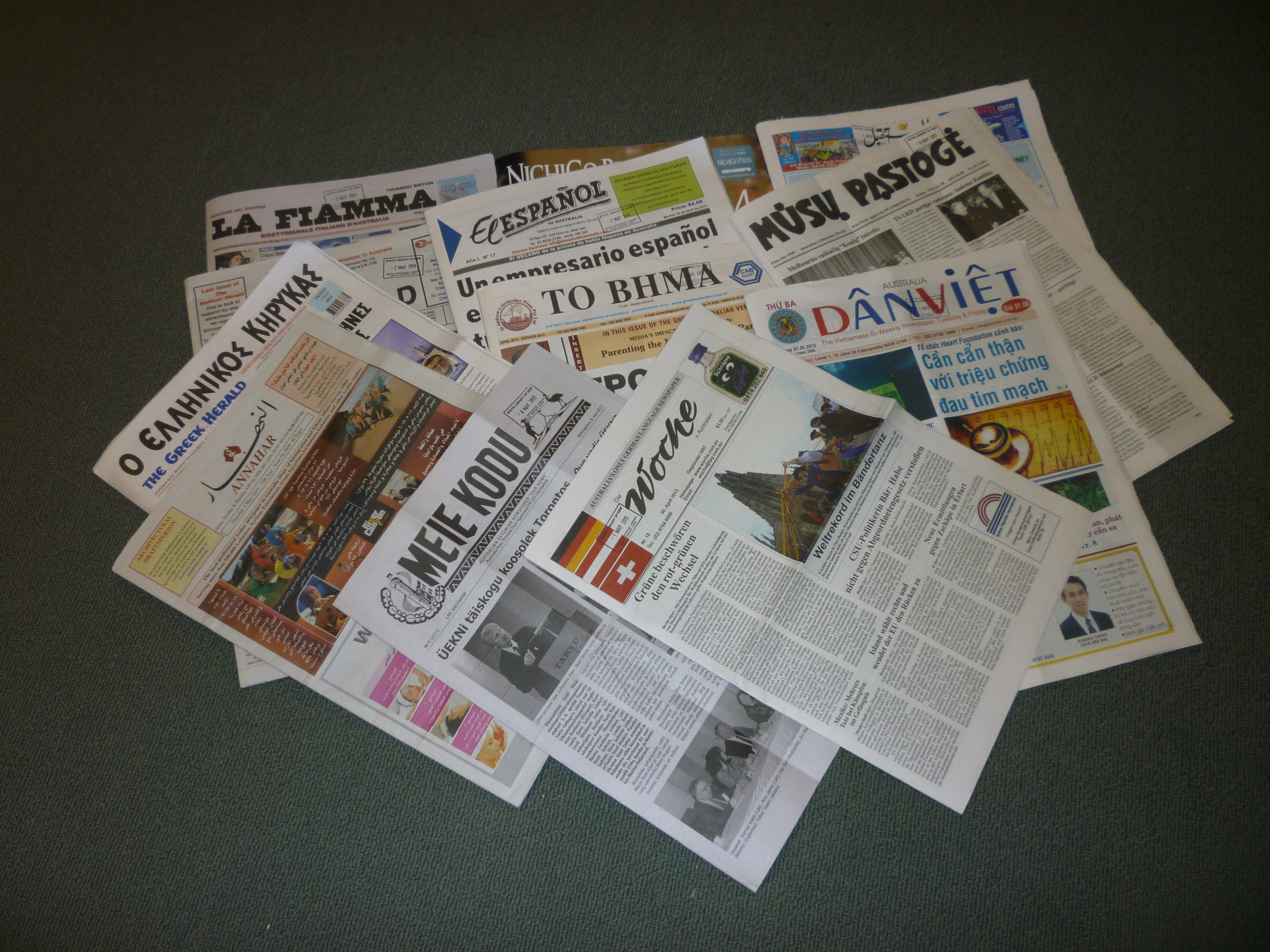
A sampling of non-English language newspapers published in New South Wales, Australia

== Arabic ==
Title	Title in English	Place of publication	Publisher	Publication dates	ISSN/ catalogue reference	Website
Al-Furat		Fairfield	Al-Furat	2003 to date		
Al Anwar	The lights	Bankstown	Australian Middle East Media	2007 to date		
Al-Iraqia	Iraqi	Sydney	Aliraqia Newspaper	2005-2020		
Al Mestaqbal	Future	Bankstown	Lebanese & Arab World Newspaper	[199-?] to date		
An-Nahar		Homebush	Lebanese Publications	1978 to date		
The Australian Panorama Arabic Newspaper		Parramatta	Panorama Arabic Newspaper	2008-2020		
Oz Arab Media		Bankstown	Oz Arab Media	2021 to date	[]	

== Bangla ==
Title	Title in English	Place of publication	Publisher	Publication dates	ISSN/ catalogue reference	Website
Banglakatha		Leppington	Banglakatha	2016 to date	ISSN 2207-2888	banglakatha.com.au

== Cambodian ==
Title	Title in English	Place of publication	Publisher	Publication dates	ISSN/ catalogue reference	Website
Phnom Penh thmei		Villawood	?	1986, 9 April to 1987, 9 September?		
Smaradey Khmer	Cambodian newspaper	Villawood	Smaradey Khmer	1985 to date		

== Chinese ==
Title	Title in English	Alternate title	Place of publication	Publisher	Publication dates	ISSN/ catalogue reference	Website
澳洲日报	Daily Chinese Herald	Ao Zhou Ri Bao	Sydney	Chinese News and Media Group	1986 to date		
澳洲新快报 已停刊	Australian New Express Daily	Ao Zhou Xin Kuai Bao	Sydney	New Express Media Group	2004 to 2019		
星島日報 已停刊	Sing Tao	Xing dao ri bao	Sydney, Melbourne, Brisbane	Sing Tao Newspapers	1982 to 2020	ISSN 1442-2719	
看中囯	Vision China Times Sydney edition	Kan Zhong Guo	Sydney	Vision Times Media (Australia) Corporation Pty Ltd	2006 to date	ISSN 2201-7100	
澳洲新報	Australian Chinese Daily	Aozhou xin bao	Sydney	Aozhou xin bao she	1994 to date	1442-6153	
同路人	Sameway Magazine	Tóng lù rén	Sydney/Brisbane edition published in Melbourne, Victoria	Creative Every Day	2004 to date	ISSN 1839-7913 ISSN 1839-7921	
澳洲日报悉尼	Sydney Chinese Daily	1688 ri bao	Sydney	Chinese News and Media Group Group	2015 to date		
	The Chinese Times	Xin shi dai bao	Sydney	Chinese Times	2000 to date		
	The Tung Wah News		Sydney	Young Fong	1898 to 1902		
	The Tung Wah Times		Sydney	Lean Fore for the Tung Wah Times Newspaper Co	1902 to 1936		
	Chinese Post	Tung Hua shih pao	Sydney	Chinese post	1995 to 2001		
大紀元時報	Epoch Times Sydney edition	Da Ji Yuan	Sydney	Australian Epoch Times LTD	2001 to date	ISSN 1838-8841	
	Degree Weekly	Xueli zhou bao	Sydney	Success Publications	1995 to 1996		
	The Independence Daily	Zi li kuai bao	Ultimo	Independence Daily	1994 to 2002	ISSN 1446-9782	

== Croatian ==
Title	Title in English	Place of publication	Publisher	Publication dates	ISSN/ catalogue reference	Website
Novo vrijeme	New times	Sydney	Novo vrijeme	? to 1993		
Domovina	Country	Liverpool	Boka Press	2012 to date	1442-4975	bokacropress.net domovina.info
Novo Doba		Darlinghurst	Novo Doba Publishing Society	1979 to 1993		
Spremnost hrvatski tjednik		Sydney	Radni Odbar	1978 to 2007		
Nova Hrvatska	New Croatia	Sydney	Jelmat Holdings	1993 to date		
Spremnost		Sydney	Spremnost	1960 to 1962		

== Czech ==
Title	Title in English	Place of publication	Publisher	Publication dates	ISSN/ catalogue reference	Website
Noviny		Sydney	Vratislav Richard E. M. J. Baptist Bejsak-Collorado-Mansfield	1999 to ?		noviny.20m.com

== Dutch ==
Title	Title in English	Place of publication	Publisher	Publication dates	ISSN/ catalogue reference	Website
Dutch weekly		Sydney	Dutch Weekly	1993, August to 2004, October	1320-9450	
Dutch Australian weekly		Sydney	Windmill Publishers	1951, October to 1993, August		

== Estonian ==
Title	Title in English	Place of publication	Publisher	Publication dates	ISSN/ catalogue references	Website
Meie Kodu	Our Home	Sydney	Juhan Viidang	1949 to date	1839-8464 (SLNSW) (Trove)	

== Philippine languages ==
Title	Title in English	Place of publication	Publisher	Publication dates	ISSN/ catalogue reference	Website
Bayanihan News		St Marys	Bayanihan News	1999 to date		bayanihannews.com.au
Ang Kalatas	The message	Quakers Hill	Ang Kalatas	2012-2020		

== Finnish ==
Title	Title in English	Place of publication	Publisher	Publication dates	ISSN/ catalogue reference	Website
Australian hyvä sanoma	Christian paper for the Finns in Australia	Tumut	Australian Hyvä Sanoma	1979 to 1981		

== French ==
Title	Title in English	Place of publication	Publisher	Publication dates	ISSN/ catalogue reference	Website
Le Courrier Australien	The Australian Courier	Clarence Street, Sydney	Le Courrier Australien	1892 to 2011; 2016 to date	0011-0442	lecourrieraustralien.com

== German ==
Title	Title in English	Place of publication	Publisher	Publication dates	ISSN/ catalogue reference	Website
Die Woche Australien	The Week Australia	Marrickville	Bakarti Pty Ltd.	1957 to date	0726-4860	diewoche.com.au
Australien-Kurier: Die Australische Monatszeitung für Information, Handel und Tourismus	Australia Courier: The Australian monthly for information, commerce and tourism	Bankstown	Europa Kurier Pty Ltd	1982 to 2002	0728-7399	
Die Brücke	The Bridge	Sydney	German-Australian Pubs	1934 to 1939		
Australische Deutsche Zeitung	Australian German newspaper	Sydney	Degortardi	1858		
Deutsch-Australische Post: Wochenschrift		Sydney	C. Wroblewski	1893 to 1906		

== Greek ==
Title	Title in English	Place of publication	Publisher	Publication dates	ISSN/ catalogue reference	Website
Akropolis	Acropolis	Enmore	Acropolis	1979 to 1996	0727-1042	
To BHMA	Vema	Marrickville	Mars Greek Media	1996 to date		
Ellinikos kirikas	The Greek Herald	Alexandria	Greek Herald	1984 to date	1442-6471	greekherald.com.au
To ethnikon vēma	Greek national vema	Arncliffe	P. Aroney	1956 to 1971 and 1990 to 1996		
The Greek Australian	The Greek Australian	Newtown	MediaMetro Pty. Ltd	2000		
O Kathimerinós kirikas	The daily herald	Marrickville	L.P. Press	2003		
Koinotikoi orizonetes	Community horizons	Lakemba	Greek Orthodox Community of NSW	2010 to date		
Ho Kolossos	Colossus	Rosebery	Pan-Rhodian Association of N.S.W	1998		
Kosmas kai kosmos		Broadway	Kosmas & Kosmos	1982	0729-9540	
O Kosmos	Kosmos	Marrickville	Avrwin Pty Ltd	1982 to 2023	0729-770X	kosmos.com.au neoskosmos.com
Kritika nea	Cretan news	Redfern	Pancretan Organization of Australia	1980		
Kyriakē	Sunday	Sydney	Sunday Press	1959 to 1971		
Nea patrida	New country	Glebe	Foreign Language Press	1974 to 2003		
Nea poreia	New course	Surry Hills	Greka Press	1980 to 1988	0314-9145	
Neoi orizontes	New horizons	Lakemba	Greek Orthodox Community of Australia	1994 to 1995		
Ōkeanis	Oceanis	Sydney	Oceanis	1915		
Panellinios kirikas	Hellenic herald	Sydney	John Stilson	1926 to 1984		

== Hindi ==
Title	Title in English	Place of publication	Publisher	Publication dates	ISSN/ catalogue reference	Website
Bharatiya samachaar	Indian news	Llandilo	Capebank	1997		
Hindi express	Hindi express	Harris Park	Indian Media Group	2005		
Hindi samachaar patrika	Hindi newspaper	Kingswood	Asia Pacific Times	1997 to date		

== Hungarian ==
Title	Title in English	Place of publication	Publisher	Publication dates	ISSN/ catalogue reference	Website
Tükör	Mirror	Sydney	Hane Pty Ltd	1963 to 1964		
Sorsunk		Summer Hill	Hungaria Publishing Co.	1958 to 1963		
Független Magyarország		North Sydney	Dr K. Nagy	1957 to 1963		
Dél Keresztje	Southern Cross	Lavender Bay	F.S. Forro	1951 to 1956		
Becsulettel		Sydney	S.B. Ladomery and the Saint Stephen Association	1955 to 1957		

== Indonesian ==
Title	Title in English	Place of publication	Publisher	Publication dates	ISSN/ catalogue reference	Website
Warta berita aquila		Petersham	Warta Berita Aquila	1994 to 1998		

== Italian ==
Title	Title in English	Place of publication	Publisher	Publication dates	ISSN/ catalogue reference	Website
Allora!	So!	Bossley Park	Italian Australian News	2017 to date		alloranews.com
La Fiamma	The Flame	Leichhardt	La Fiamma	1947 to date		lafiamma.com.au
Il Corriere di Settegiorni	The Seven Day Messenger	Annandale	Gazzettino Pty Ltd	1974 to 1981		
Il Giornale Italiano	The Italian Journal	Sydney	John Sefton Aubrey	1932 to 1940	1839-8529	
Italo-Australiano	Italo-Australian	Sydney	A. J. Tomalin	1922 to 1940		
L'Italo-Australiano	The Italian-Australian	Sydney	Qunito Ebcole	1905 to 1909		
Il Mondo	The World	Glebe	Valerio Sebastianutti	1991 to 1996		
Il Nuovo Risveglio	The New Awakening	Randwick	A. Baldovin	1956 to 1957		
Oceania	Oceania	Sydney	A. F. Rimoldi & A. Folli	1913 to 1915		
Settegiorni	Seven Days	Stanmore	Settegiorni	1962 to 1974	0037-2900	
Uniamoci	Let Us Unite	Sydney	Joseph Prampolini	1903 to 1904		

== Japanese ==
Title	Title in English	Place of publication	Publisher	Publication dates	ISSN/ catalogue reference	Website
Jenta	Japanese weekly newspaper	Sydney	Info-M Pty Ltd	2004, 5 March to date		
Nichi-Go puresu	Nichigo press : monthly newspaper for Japanese	Double Bay	Nichigo Press	1977 to date		
Cheers	Cheers : monthly newspaper for Japanese	Crows Nest	Japanese Entertainment Paper Cheers	2002		

== Korean ==
Title	Title in English	Place of publication	Publisher	Publication dates	ISSN/ catalogue reference	Website
The Dae yang chu news		Strathfield South	Dae Yang Chu News	1990 to 1992		
The Hoju dong-a		Surry Hills	Dong-a Il Bo Media	1992 to date		
Hoju soshik	The Korean community news	St Ives	Hoju Soshik	1982 to 1984		
The Korea times	The Korea times	Petersham	Francis Lee	1993 to 1995		
Hoju dong-a	The Korean daily	Eastwood	Korean Daily	2011 to date		
The Kyung hyang shinmum	Korean times	Campsie	Hoju Ilbosa	1999 to 2012		
The Sydney Korean post	The Sydney Korean post	Campsie	Sydney Korean Post	1989		
Top weekly	Top weekly	Campsie	Top Sinmunsa	1996 to date		

== Lithuanian ==
Title	Title in English	Place of publication	Publisher	Publication dates	ISSN/ catalogue reference	Website
Musų Pastogė	Our Haven	Sydney	Lithunanian Community Publishing Society	1949 to date		

== Maltese ==
Title	Title in English	Place of publication	Publisher	Publication dates	ISSN/ catalogue reference	Website
Malta News	Malta News	Sydney	George Cross Publishing	1959		
The Maltese Herald	The Maltese Herald	Newtown	Maltese News & Information Centre	1961 to 2013		

== Nepalese ==
Title	Title in English	Place of publication	Publisher	Publication dates	ISSN/ catalogue reference	Website
Namaste Nepal News		Sydney Melbourne	NNN Media	since 2012		
Nepali Times Australia		Strathfield		2008 to date		
Nepal News Australia			Harris Park Pacific Media	2013 to date		
Nepalipatra (Nepalese Fortnightly)		250 Pitt Street, Sydney	2009 to date			

== Persian ==
Title	Title in English	Place of publication	Publisher	Publication dates	ISSN/ catalogue reference	Website
Zagros Tribune		Crows Nest	Damavand Publishing	2007 to 2012		
Bamdad Weekly	Bamdad Weekly	Edgecliff	L.C.J. Publishing	1992 to date		
Iran News	Iran News	Granville	Iran News	2010 to date		
Persian Herald	Persian Herald	Merrylands	The Persian Herald	1997 to 2011		

== Polish ==
Title	Title in English	Place of publication	Publisher	Publication dates	ISSN/ catalogue reference	Website
Wiadomości Polskie	Polish News	Sydney	White Eagle Press	1949 to date		

== Portuguese ==
Title	Title in English	Place of publication	Publisher	Publication dates	ISSN/ catalogue reference	Website
Portugal Noticias	Portugal News	Homebush	Portugal Noticias	1994 to date		
A Voz de Portugal	Voice of Portugal	Petersham	Voice of Portugal Newspaper Pty Ltd	1992 to 1994		

== Punjabi and Hindi ==
Title	Title in English	Place of publication	Publisher	Publication dates	ISSN/ catalogue reference	Website
Navyug	Navyug	Sydney	Absolute Graphics	2003 to 2005		
Punjabi Jagran	Punjabi Jagran	Jalandhar India	From Sydney N.S.W Tejinder Singh Sehgal	2011 to date		
Punjab Express	Punjab Express	Sydney	Punjab Express	2005 to date		
Punjab Times	Punjab Times	Sydney	Punjab Times	2001 to date		
Sea7 Australia	Sea7 Australia	Melbourne	Sea7 Australia Pty Ltd	2023 to date		

== Russian ==
Title	Title in English	Place of publication	Publisher	Publication dates	ISSN/ catalogue reference	Website
Горизонт (Gorizont)	Horizon	Maroubra	Yan Michailov	1993 to ?	1442-2506	
Australiĭskoe Slovo	Slovo : Australia's Russian language periodical	Sydney	Camelot Press	1971 to 1974		
Edinenie		Chippendale	Unification	1950 to date		
Slovo		Wentworthville	Russian News Pty Ltd	2001 to 2003		
Vzgl︠i︡ad	Glance	Hornsby	Lotus Group Australia	1994 to 1998		

== Serbian ==
Title	Title in English	Place of publication	Publisher	Publication dates	ISSN/ catalogue reference	Website
Novosti	The News	Sydney	Novosti Pty Ltd	? to date		
Srpska Borba	Serbian struggle	Cabramatta	Serbian Cultural Club	1977, December to 1981 September		

== Spanish ==
Title	Title in English	Alternate title	Place of publication	Publisher	Publication dates	ISSN/ catalogue reference	Website
El español en Australia	The Spanish in Australia	Nuevo español	Bankstown	Español en Australia	1965 to 1995, 2002 to date	0726-4879 1443-7775	
El español: continuador de una larga tradicion en Australia	The Spanish: maintainer of a long tradition in Australia	Español	Lidcombe	El Español	2007 to 2008		
The Spanish news			Glenwood	The Spanish News	2003		
The new Spanish herald			Glenwood	The New Herald	2003		
The Latin Australian Times	The Latin Australian Times	LAT	Sydney	Latin Australian Times	2016		latinaustralian.com.au
El Nuevo espanol en Australia	The new Spanish in Australia	Espanol en Australia	Hurstville	Espanol en Australia	1995 to 2001		
Noticias y deportes: the Hispanoamerican newspaper	News and Sports: the Hispanoamerican newspaper		Fairfield	Noticias y deportes	1975 to 2012	1838-1154, 1446-7100	
Tribuna		Tribuna (Burwood)	Burwood	Webdell Pty Ltd	1982 to 1983	0810-5588	
Extra informativo			Sydney	"El Expreso" Publishing Co.	1979		
El Expreso	The Express		Kingsford	"El Expreso" Publishing Co.	1979 to 1998		
The Spanish herald			Glebe	Foreign Language Publications	1971 to date	0725-1831	
El Faro	The Lighthouse		Sydney	El Faro	1975		
Semanario El Español	The Spanish weekly		Lidcombe	ASBA Australian Spanish Business Association	2013		

== Tamil ==
Title	Title in English	Place of publication	Publisher	Publication dates	ISSN/ catalogue reference	Website
Eelamurasu fortnightly		Lidcombe	Eelamurasu Australia	1999 to 2007		

== Thai ==
Title	Title in English	Place of publication	Publisher	Publication dates	ISSN/ catalogue reference	Website
Thai-Oz News	Thai-Oz News	Sydney	Thai-Oz News	1990 to date		
Thai Press	Thai Press	Bossley Park	Ruamthai Newspaper	1996 to 2020		

== Turkish ==
Title	Title in English	Alternate title	Place of publication	Publisher	Publication dates	ISSN/ catalogue reference	Website
Toplum sesi	Community Voice		Auburn	Australian Turkish Social and Cultural Trust	1995		
Yeni Gazette	New Gazette		Auburn	Yeni Gazette	1992 to 1995		
Yeni vatan	New Home		Auburn	Sedat Yilmazok	1973 to date		yenivatan.com.au
The Turkishstar News			Auburn	The Turkishstar News	2020		
Zaman Avustralya	Time in Australia		Auburn	Temsilcilik Baski Merkez	1970 to date		zamanaustralia.com
Turkish News Weekly			Granville	Turkish News Weekly	2001 to [2014?]		

== Ukrainian ==
Title	Title in English	Place of publication	Publisher	Publication dates	ISSN/ catalogue reference	Website
Vil'na dumka	Free Thought	Sydney	Vil'na dumka	1949 to date		

== Vietnamese ==
Title	Title in English	Place of publication	Publisher	Publication dates	ISSN/ catalogue reference	Website
Dân Vịêt	The Vietnamese tribune	Cabramatta	Dân Vịêt	2003 to 2020		
Nhat bao chieu duong	The Sunrise Daily Newspaper	Cabramatta	Ethnic Press Association of Australia	1983 to date		
Tieng noi nguoi Viet	The Voice of Vietnam	Cabramatta	Tieng noi nguoi Viet	1992 to 1995		
Vịêt lụân	Vietnamnese Herald	Bankstown	Vịêt lụân	1983 to date	0812-6666	vietluan.com.au
Vietnam thoi nay	Vietnam News Today	Bankstown	Vietnam thoi nay	1989 to 2005		

== See also ==
- List of newspapers in Australia
