= Internet censorship in Ba'athist Syria =

Internet censorship in Ba'athist Syria was extensive; with numerous websites and online platforms being banned for political reasons. Internet usage was authorized only through state-run servers and people accessing through other means were arrested. Filtering and blocking was found to be pervasive in the political and Internet tools areas, and selective in the social and conflict/security areas by the OpenNet Initiative in August 2009.

After the mass protests of the Syrian revolution in 2011, the government of Bashar al-Assad had intensified cyber-surveillace measures and internet blockades across Syria until his overthrow in December 2024 with the Fall of Damascus. Internet connectivity between Syria and the outside world shut down in late November 2011, and again in early May 2013. Syria was one of the five countries on the Reporters Without Borders organization's March 2013 list of "State Enemies of the Internet". Syria's Internet was cut off more than ten times in 2013, and again in March 2014.

Access to online information in Ba'athist Syria was tightly controlled by cyber surveillance facilities affiliated with the Assad government. Assad government had taken the controlled surveillance to as far as arresting people talking negatively about the government. While it was possible for users to bypass blocks through proxy apps, Syrian cyber forces use tracking software to identify the IP addresses of such users. While many sites such as TikTok remain blocked as of 2024, many more were inaccessible due to sanctions or IP restrictions from the websites themselves. As of November 2024, Wikipedia is accessible without using a proxy.

As of December 2024, the controlled tracking on the Internet has come to a stop, due to Bashar Al Assad fleeing the country leaving citizens stuck without a government. Mohammad Al-Basher took control of the country, as he was prime minister. It's unknown whether the Internet monitoring is still there, but we know the Assad monitoring is gone.

== Overview ==
Syria had been on Reporters Without Borders' Enemy of the Internet list since 2006 when the list was established. In 2009, the committee to Protect Journalists named Syria number three in a list of the ten worst countries in which to be a blogger, given the arrests, harassment, and restrictions which online writers in Syria faced. In May 2012 the committee to Protect Journalists named Syria the third most censored country in the world, saying:

In its campaign to silence media coverage, the government disabled mobile phones, landlines, electricity, and the Internet. Authorities have routinely extracted passwords of social media sites from journalists through beatings and torture. The pro-government online group the Syrian Electronic Army had frequently hacked websites to post pro-regime material, and the government had been implicated in malware attacks targeted at those reporting on the crisis.

In addition to filtering a wide range of Web content, the Syrian government monitors Internet use very closely and had detained citizens "for expressing their opinions or reporting information online." Vague and broadly worded laws invite government abuse and had prompted Internet users to engage in self-censorship to avoid the state's ambiguous grounds for arrest.

The transfer of online information in Syria was tightly controlled by cyber infrastructure facilities affiliated with the Assad government. Assad government's online censorship policies range from drastic reduction of internet speed to total blackouts of internet and cellular networks.

== History ==
=== Late 2000s ===
After winning the 2007 presidential election in Syria with 99.82% of the declared votes, Bashar al-Assad implemented numerous measures that further intensified political and cultural repression. Numerous journalists were arrested and independent press centres were shut down. Syrian government also intensified its censorship of the Internet; banning access to more than 200 websites, including sites such as Wikipedia, YouTube, Facebook, Twitter, Instagram, WhatsApp, Spotify, Google Play, LinkedIn, DeviantArt, PayPal, Netflix, Scratch, etc. Internet centres were allowed to operate only after the prior authorization of Syrian surveillance agencies. In 2007, the Syrian government enacted a law that forced Internet cafes to keep records of all online comments posted by users in chat forums, as well as their browsing habits. Several individuals who used internet cafes were arrested and reports emerged of the existence of specialized prison centres that detained individuals accused of "internet crimes".

In August 2007, YouTube was blocked after videos circulated denouncing the crackdown on the Kurd minority.

In November 2007, the Syrian government blocked Facebook, explaining that the website promoted attacks on authorities. The Facebook ban, like the ban of most websites, was not entirely effective and many people were able to maintain access using open proxies or other circumvention techniques.

From 30 April 2008 to the present (23 October 2013) the Arabic Wikipedia had been blocked. Syrian journalist Waed al-Mahna, an activist for archaeological preservation, was sentenced imprisonment via absentia in 2008 over an online article that criticized Syrian Ministry of Culture's policy to destroy a heritage site in Old Damascus.

=== Early 2010s ===
In February 2011, Syria stopped filtering YouTube, Facebook, and Twitter.

Early in the Syrian civil war on 3 June 2011 the government shut down the country's Internet network. Although fully restored the following day, the country's 3G, DSL and dial-up were disconnected the same day massive protests and marches were being organized throughout the country to call for the removal of President Bashar al-Assad and for "Children's Friday", to honor children who had died during the uprisings.

On 26 July 2011, the website the-syrian.com, a site dedicated to "granting freedom of speech to everyone, whether against or with the regime", was blocked from within Syria. The site was mostly in Arabic and targeted to Syrian audiences, although it had an English section. A graph that appeared in the Wall Street Journal shows the number of blocked access attempts to the-Syrian.com and other sites between 1 and 5 August 2011.

In October 2011, US based Blue Coat Systems of Sunnyvale, California acknowledged that Syria was using its devices to censor Web activity, a possible violation of US trade embargoes. According to an article in the Wall Street Journal information about Blue Coat in Syria began to trickle out in August, after a "hacktivist" group called Telecomix managed to gain access to unsecured servers on Syria's Internet systems and found evidence of Blue Coat filtering. The group found computer records, or logs, detailing which Web pages the Blue Coat devices were censoring in Syria.

In June 2012, the Electronic Frontier Foundation (EFF) reported that pro-Syrian-government malware campaigns had increased in frequency and sophistication and that a new Trojan distributed as a .pif file via Skype targets Syrian activists. The malware gives an attacker the ability to execute arbitrary code on the infected computer. Evidence suggests that this campaign was being carried out by the same pro-Syrian-government hackers responsible for previous attacks. The new Trojan is one in a series used to attack Syrian opposition activists that includes several Trojans, one disguised as a Skype encryption tool, which covertly install spying software onto the infected computer, as well as a multitude of phishing attacks which steal YouTube and Facebook login credentials.

On 19 July 2012, Internet access from Syria traveling via the state carrier Syrian Telecommunications Establishment was cut off for a period of 40 minutes.

On 29 November 2012, almost all Internet connectivity between Syria and the outside world was cut off at around 12:00 to 13:00 UTC+02:00 (local time). This coincided with intense rebel activity inside Syria. In 2014, Edward Snowden alleged that the NSA was responsible.

The Syrian Internet blackout was a break in Syria's Internet connectivity that happened for nineteen hours between 7 and 8 May 2013. Mobile phone and telephone services were also cut. No-one yet had admitted responsibility for the event or can figure out how it happened. The Syrians blamed Cyberterrorists for the incident. It caused worry that the blackout was intended to mask an impending military offensive.

Syria was one of the five countries on the Reporters Without Borders organization's March 2013 list of "State Enemies of the Internet", countries ruled by governments that perpetrate pervasive surveillance of news providers, resulting in harsh restrictions on access to information and personal lives. Assad government's cyberforces engage in several social engineering techniques and online surveillance measures such as phishing, internet blackouts, malware attacks, interception of Skype calls, etc. Syria's Internet was cut off more than ten times in 2013, and again in March 2014.

=== 2020s ===
After Assad's regime fell on December 8th 2024, internet connectivity for Syrians noticeably improved with the current government pushing for the building of digital infrastructure and the moving of services online. Connections are still unstable.

== Syrian Electronic Army (SEA) ==
The Syrian Electronic Army, also known as the Syrian Electronic Soldiers, was a collection of pro-government computer hackers aligned with Syrian President Bashar al-Assad. The Syrian Electronic Army (SEA) was the first public, virtual army in the Arab world to openly launch cyber attacks on its opponents, though the precise nature of its relationship with the Syrian government was debated.

The SEA claims responsibility for defacing or otherwise compromising hundreds of websites that it contends spread news hostile to the Syrian government. These include news websites such as BBC News, the Associated Press, National Public Radio, Al Jazeera, Financial Times, The Daily Telegraph, Syrian satellite broadcaster Orient TV, and Dubai-based al-Arabia TV, as well as rights organizations such as Human Rights Watch. Other SEA targets include VoIP apps, such as Viber, and Tango.

The group reportedly uses phishing tactics to gain sufficient information to compromise accounts. In the first week of May 2013, the Twitter account of The Onion was compromised by the SEA, after a phishing attack targeting The Onion employees led to its account being compromised.

In addition to the high-profile defacement and attacks on public targets, the SEA also carried out surveillance to discover the identities and location of Syrian rebels. This electronic monitoring also reportedly extends to foreign aid workers.

== See also ==
- Media of Syria
- Syrian Free Press
