= Chinese language in Australia =

Australian Chinese
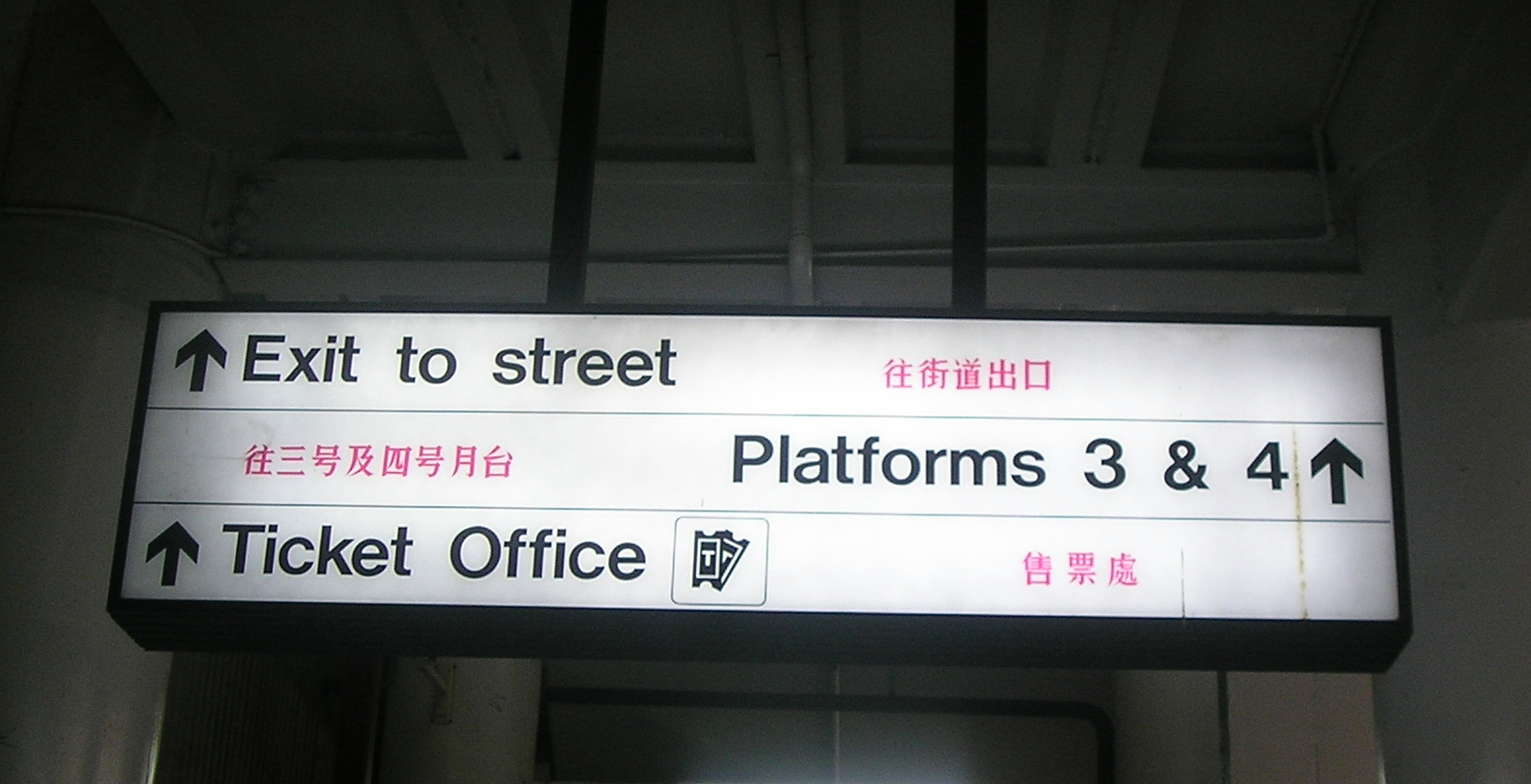
- A sign in English and Chinese at Fortitude Valley railway station in Brisbane
- Region: Australia
- Native speakers: 1,022,506 (all varieties) (2021)
- Language family: Sino-Tibetan: Sinitic; Chinese; Australian Chinese
- Writing system: Chinese; Pinyin; Chinese Braille

Language codes
- ISO 639-3: –

The Chinese language is the second-most spoken language in Australia.

Australia has more Chinese people per capita than any other country outside Asia. In the 2021 census, 1,390,693 Australians identified themselves as being of Chinese ancestry, representing 5.5% of the national population. In the same census, 980,555 Australians indicated that they mainly spoke either Mandarin or Cantonese at home, representing 4.0% of the national population, making it the second-most spoken language in Australia after English. The Chinese language is an important part of the Chinese Australian identity. Some older generations and recent arrivals to Australia from China are monolingual in Chinese.

== Education ==
Chinese is a widely taught second language in Australian schools, and is one of the languages mentioned in the Australian Curriculum. However, the vast majority of students studying the language are Chinese. Chinese is widely considered a relatively difficult language for native English speakers to learn. Other foreign languages such as French, German, Indonesian, Italian, Japanese and Spanish are much more commonly learnt and understood by non-Chinese students than Chinese is.

The main variety of Chinese taught in Australian schools is Mandarin. In 2017, Mandarin was the fourth-most taught foreign language other than English. It was the most taught foreign language at schools in New South Wales and Tasmania, while it was the third-most taught at schools in Queensland and the Northern Territory. In 2021, Mandarin became the most taught foreign language in Victorian schools, with 19.6% of Victorian language students studying the language. However, the vast majority of Australian schools that offer Mandarin as a subject are located within major metropolitan areas, where foreign languages are less commonly studied as elective subjects, and those who do study a foreign language as an elective often study French, German, Indonesian, Japanese or Spanish, or (in many schools) an Indigenous language.

The relatively poor diplomatic relations between Australia and China during the trade war between the two countries, as well as the COVID-19 pandemic, negatively impacted the study of the language in Australia, given that the majority of Australians held unfavourable views of the Chinese government, although there have been some signs of improvement since. A small but somewhat influential minority of Australians who openly hold racist and xenophobic views have also negatively affected the Chinese language and culture in Australia. Historically, the Chinese language was never taught in Australia due to racist views held by many Australians, as well as the White Australia Policy.

== Media ==
=== News ===
One of the first Chinese newspapers in Australia was the Chinese Times, which was published in Melbourne in 1902, moving to Sydney in 1922 and ceasing publication in 1949.

Modern Chinese newspapers and online publications also exist, including the Australian Chinese Daily, Sameway Magazine and Vision China Times.

Online news websites and news broadcasts on television and radio also exist in Chinese, with ABC News and many SBS News airing Chinese-language news broadcasts. SBS WorldWatch, a television channel airing world news bulletins in over 30 languages, airs two local news bulletins in Mandarin and Arabic (the two most spoken languages in Australia) live on television across Australia.

During the COVID-19 pandemic, the daily English-language press conferences held by then-New South Wales Premier Gladys Berejiklian and NSW Health, which were broadcast live on television to provide updates and statistics about the pandemic in the state, were translated into many languages, including both Mandarin and Cantonese.

== Demographics ==
=== Varieties ===
Number of Australians who speak a Chinese variety at home, as of 2021
Variety	Speakers	%
Mandarin	685,263	2.7%
Cantonese	295,292	1.2%
Min Nan (Note: Including Hokkien.)	20,059	0.1%
Hakka	9,140	0.0%
Chinese, nfd (Note: Not further defined. Refers to respondents who nominated Chinese as the main language they spoke at home, but did not specify which variety they most commonly used.)	8,539	0.0%
Wu	4,183	0.0%

=== Languages spoken ===
Languages spoken by Chinese-speaking region
Country / Region	Percentage fluent		
Country / Region	Chinese	English	Other
Mainland China	93.1% (Note: 78.2% Mandarin, 14.9% Cantonese)	66.1% (Note: 3.4% at home)	1.8%
Hong Kong SAR	82.0% (Note: 78.8% Cantonese, 3.2% Mandarin)	86.5% (Note: 15.3% at home)	2.4% (Note: 1.0% Vietnamese)
Republic of China (Taiwan)	90.9% (Note: 85.7% Mandarin, 4.3% Min Nan, 0.9% Cantonese)	73.7% (Note: 7.5% at home)	0.9%
