= Free Press =

A free press (or freedom of the press) is the principle of legal protections for public communications media.

Free Press may also refer to:

== Publications ==
- Free Press, the journal of the former Campaign for Press and Broadcasting Freedom (1980–2018)
- Free Press (Malayalam magazine), a magazine in the Malayalam language
- The Free Press (CBS News), an American media company and online publication

== Newspapers ==
=== United States ===
- Columbus Free Press, a former monthly alternative journal in Ohio
- Detroit Free Press, a Michigan daily newspaper
- The Free Press (Mankato), a Minnesota daily newspaper
- The Free Press, a former newspaper in Ozark, Alabama, 1896–1900
- The Free Press (University of Southern Maine), a student newspaper
- Los Angeles Free Press, an underground newspaper
- Montana Free Press
- New Hampshire Free Press, a blog and bimonthly newspaper by Free State Project activists

=== Canada ===
- Winnipeg Free Press, a daily newspaper
- The London Free Press, a daily newspaper in Ontario

=== Other places ===
- Free Press, predecessor to The Aberdeen Press and Journal in Scotland
- The Kilmore Free Press, an Australian former weekly newspaper
- The Free Press Journal, an Indian daily newspaper
- Hong Kong Free Press
- Syrian Free Press, an electronic newspaper about Syrian events

== Other ==
- Free Press (advocacy group), US
- Free Press (publisher), an imprint of Simon & Schuster
- House of the Free Press, a building in Bucharest, Romania
- The Free Press, Cambridge, a pub in Cambridgeshire, England

== See also ==
- Free newspaper
- Freedom Press, an anarchist publishing house in the United Kingdom
- Freedom of the Press (disambiguation)
