= Jaan Tomp (journalist) =

Estonian journalist

Jaan Tomp (13 May 1882 – 1943) was an Estonian journalist. He was born in Uue-Võidu vald, Viljandi County. From 1905 to 1908 he worked for Kodumaa, followed by Kodumaa Hääl, Maa, Meie Kodu, and Meie Kodumaa. From 1919 to 1920, he was the chairman of the Estonian Journalists' Union, and he was an honorary member from 1934. From 1918 until 1937 he was an editor of Vaba Maa.
