= Spielvogel =

Spielvogel is a surname from Germany. It was also adopted by Ashkenazi Jews. Notable people with this surname include:

- Alice Mae (nee Buschmann) Spielvogel, singer of the barbershop quartet, The Chordettes
- Barbaralee Diamonstein-Spielvogel, American author and activist
- Carl Spielvogel (1928–2021), American businessman and diplomat
- Jackson J. Spielvogel, American academic and author
- Nathan Spielvogel (1874–1956), Australian school teacher and author
