= Freep =

Freep may refer to:

- Free Press (disambiguation)#Newspapers:

- Detroit Free Press, a daily newspaper published in Detroit, Michigan
- Los Angeles Free Press, an Alternative newspaper started in May 1964. This publication is often cited as the first of the alternative newspapers of this type.
- Daily Free Press, Boston University's independent student newspaper

- Free Republic, a U.S. Internet community for conservative activists
- Fearless Freep, an off-stage character from a Warner Bros. cartoon
