= Nathaniel Walter Swan =

Nathaniel Walter Swan (or N. Walter Swan; 1834 – 31 July 1884) was an Irish-born Australian journalist and short-story writer.

== Biography ==
He was born in Monaghan, Ireland, and was said to be educated at the University of Glasgow. In the 1850s he travelled to Victoria in Australia, to take part in the gold rush in the colony; he had some success with a claim in Sandhurst. On his way to Melbourne after abandoning gold-digging, he met the writer Henry Kingsley, spending a few days with him shortly before Kingsley's return to England. He was also friends with Marcus Clarke and Henry Kendall.

Settling in Ararat, Swan became editor of the local paper, the Ararat Advertiser. In 1869 he moved to Stawell where he edited the Pleasant Creek News. He sometimes attended the Yorick Club in Melbourne. He wrote stories, some of which appeared in serial form in publications including The Sydney Mail and the Melbourne Australasian.

He wrote three books, one of which Luke Miver's Harvest was first published in 1879 in The Sydney Mail as the winning entry in a literary competition which won Swan a prize of £100, in addition two collections of his stories were published: Tales of Australian Life (London, 1875) and A Couple of Cups Ago, and other stories (Melbourne, 1885).

Swan's father was described as a linen merchant and his early education in Monaghan was under the tutorship of the Presbyterian minister Reverend John Bleckley who had earlier been teacher to Charles Gavan Duffy. Swan had a son, Walter Blakely Swan, and it is thought that he honoured his teacher in his son's middle name. One of his obituarist's claimed that he had studied at the University of Glasgow but that University has no records of a student called N.W. Swan between 1850 and 1854, he may have attended Belfast's Royal Academical Institution but its records for the period have been lost. His wife was Mary Ellen O'Brien who was born in 1845 in County Tipperary, they married in Ararat's Roman Catholic Church.
