= Freedom of the Press (disambiguation) =

Freedom of the press is the freedom of communication and expression through mediums.

Freedom of the Press may also refer to:

- "The Freedom of the Press" (Animal Farm), George Orwell's preface to Animal farm
- Freedom of the Press (film), a 1928 American silent mystery film
- Freedom of the Press Foundation (FPF), a non-profit organization to support freedom of the press

== See also ==
- Foundation for Press Freedom (FLIP), a non-profit organization to protect threatened journalists in Colombia
- Freedom Press, an anarchist publishing house in the United Kingdom
- International Press Freedom Award (disambiguation)
- Free Press (disambiguation)
