= List of awards and nominations received by Moesha =

List of awards won by Moesha
Awards & Nominations
Moesha
Award	Won	Nominated
Image Awards	2	19
Kids' Choice Awards	0	3
SHINE Awards	1	1
Teen Choice Awards	0	2
Young Artist Award	0	4
YoungStar Awards	0	3
Total number of wins and nominations for Moesha
Totals	3	32
- Footnotes

Moesha is an American situation comedy, originally broadcast between 1996 and 2001. It has won and been nominated for a variety of different awards, including 19 Image Award nominations across the six seasons of the show.

During its time on air, Moesha was nominated for 32 different awards, and won 3 awards. In this list, "year" refers to the year the award was presented to the winner.

== By award ==
=== Image Awards ===
Year	Category	Nominee(s)	Episode	Result
1997	Outstanding Youth Actor/Actress	Brandy Norwood		Won
1997	Outstanding Comedy Series			Nominated
1998	Outstanding Supporting Actress in a Comedy Series	Countess Vaughn		Won
1998	Outstanding Comedy Series			Nominated
1998	Outstanding Lead Actress in a Comedy Series	Brandy Norwood		Nominated
1998	Outstanding Supporting Actress in a Comedy Series	Sheryl Lee Ralph		Nominated
1999	Outstanding Supporting Actress in a Comedy Series	Countess Vaughn		Nominated
1999	Outstanding Comedy Series			Nominated
1999	Outstanding Lead Actress in a Comedy Series	Brandy Norwood		Nominated
1999	Outstanding Supporting Actress in a Comedy Series	Sheryl Lee Ralph		Nominated
2000	Outstanding Supporting Actress in a Comedy Series	Countess Vaughn		Nominated
2000	Outstanding Youth Actor/Actress	Marcus T. Paulk		Nominated
2000	Outstanding Supporting Actress in a Comedy Series	Sheryl Lee Ralph		Nominated
2000	Outstanding Lead Actress in a Comedy Series	Brandy Norwood		Nominated
2001	Outstanding Youth Actor/Actress	Marcus T. Paulk		Nominated
2001	Outstanding Lead Actress in a Comedy Series	Brandy Norwood		Nominated
2001	Outstanding Supporting Actress in a Comedy Series	Sheryl Lee Ralph		Nominated
2002	Outstanding Youth Actor/Actress	Marcus T. Paulk		Nominated
2002	Outstanding Supporting Actress in a Comedy Series	Sheryl Lee Ralph		Nominated

=== Kids' Choice Awards ===
Year	Category	Nominee(s)	Episode	Result
1998	Favorite Television Actress	Brandy Norwood		Nominated
2000	Favorite Television Actress	Brandy Norwood		Nominated
2001	Favorite Television Actress	Brandy Norwood		Nominated

=== SHINE Awards ===
Year	Category	Nominee	Episode	Result
2000	Comedy Episode	Brandy Norwood	"Let's Talk About Sex".	Won

=== Teen Choice Awards ===
Year	Category	Nominee(s)	Episode	Result
1999	TV - Choice Actress	Brandy Norwood		Nominated
1999	TV - Choice Comedy			Nominated
2019	TV - Choice Throwback TV Show			Nominated

=== Young Artist Awards ===
Year	Category	Nominee(s)	Result
1997	Best Performance in a TV Comedy - Leading Young Actress	Brandy Norwood	Nominated
1997	Best Performance in a TV Comedy/Drama - Supporting Young Actor Age Ten or Under	Marcus T. Paulk	Nominated
1998	Best Performance in a TV Comedy Series - Leading Young Performer	Brandy Norwood	Nominated
1999	Best Performance in a TV Drama or Comedy Series - Leading Young Actress	Brandy Norwood	Nominated

=== YoungStar Awards ===
Year	Category	Nominee	Episode	Result
1997	Best Performance by a Young Actor in a Comedy TV Series	Marcus T. Paulk		Nominated
1997	Best Performance by a Young Actress in a Comedy TV Series	Brandy Norwood		Nominated
1999	Best Performance by a Young Actor in a Drama TV Series	Marcus T. Paulk		Nominated
