= Gfycat =

Defunct American video hosting company

Gfycat, co.
- Available in: English, German, Dutch, French, Spanish, Italian, Japanese
- Founded: 2015; 11 years ago
- Dissolved: September 1, 2023; 3 years ago
- Headquarters: Edmonton, Alberta, Canada
- Owner: Snap Inc.
- Founders: Jeff Harris; Dan McEleney; Richard Rabbat
- Services: Create, discover, and share GIFs and short videos
- Website: gfycat.com (Archived September 1, 2023, at the Wayback Machine)
- Users: 220 million monthly active users
- Current status: Defunct

Gfycat (/ˈdʒɪfikæt/ JIF-ee-kat) was a user-generated short video hosting company founded by Richard Rabbat, Dan McEleney, and Jeff Harris.

== History ==
Founded in 2013 in Edmonton, Canada, Gfycat was among the first web services to offer video encoding of GIFs. It was incorporated in the United States in 2015, and raised $10 million in a 2016 seed funding round.

Gfycat offered a web platform for uploading and hosting short video content, as well as an iMessage app, an Android app, and the GIF Brewery macOS application for GIF and video creation. It also had integrations with Reddit, the messaging app Tango, Microsoft Outlook, Skype, and WordPress, among others. It was a finalist for the 2016 Advertising Age Creativity Awards in the "Startup to Watch" category.

In 2016, Gfycat ranked within the top 57 websites in the U.S. by traffic, with over 130 million monthly active users in 2017. Its users were primarily concentrated in English-speaking countries, with a significant foothold in Europe and Latin America. It supported sixteen languages, including English, French, Spanish, Russian, Ukrainian, Japanese, Chinese (traditional and simplified), Korean, and Arabic. Users fell primarily in the 18-35 age range.

Gfycat had offices in Edmonton, Alberta and Palo Alto, California.

In 2018 Gfycat had an alleged data breach; an estimated 8 million accounts were compromised, and its database was put for sale on the Dream Market.

In December 2019, Gfycat launched redgifs.com for adult content.

In May 2020, Gfycat was acquired by Snap Inc., parent company of Snapchat. On May 12, 2020, Gfycat banned adult content completely.

On May 18, 2023, the TLS certificate for gfycat.com expired. Problems with uploading had been reported for months prior to the certificate's expiration, with a lack of response from the company's support. On May 22, the TLS certificate was renewed, with a Snap Inc. spokesperson describing it as a "temporary issue", though problems with uploading to the site remained.

On June 30, 2023, Gfycat announced it would discontinue service on September 1, 2023. On September 1, 2023, the website was taken offline.
