= Yea Chronicle =

The Yea Chronicle is a weekly newspaper that circulates on Wednesdays throughout the western region of the Murrindindi Shire in Victoria, Australia.

The newspaper started as The Yea Telegraph in October 1885. The name changed to The Yea Chronicle in 1890. An early owner was Frederick G. Purcell. It was later owned by Tom Dignam and who sold the paper to Ash and Fleur Long in 1984 and they in turn sold it to Geoff Heyes and Jenny Smith of Alexandra newspapers in May 1993. As of 2018 it has a circulation of 524.

== See also ==
- List of newspapers in Australia
