= The Charleville Courier =

Former newspaper in Queensland, Australia

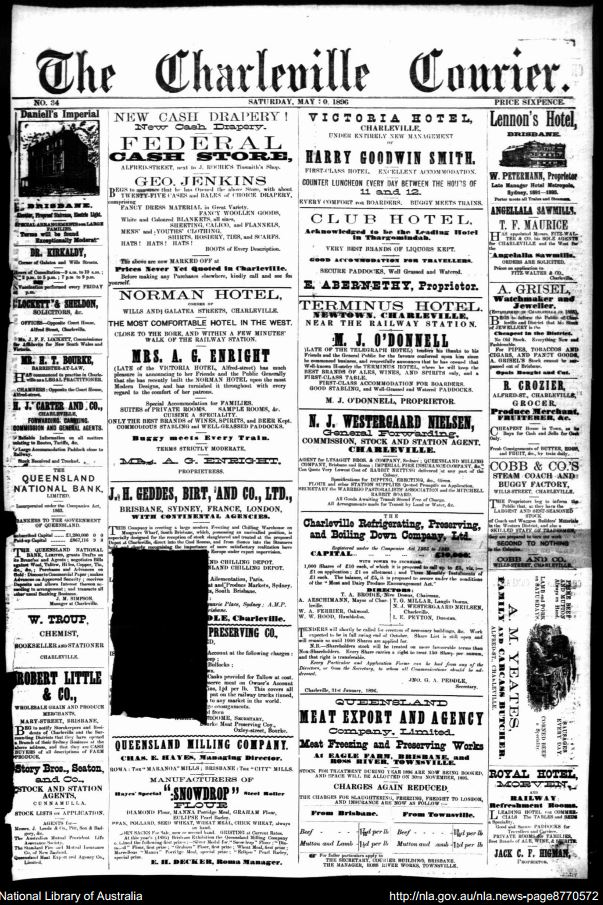
Front page of the Charleville Courier Saturday, 30 May 1896

The Charleville Courier was a newspaper published in Charleville, Queensland, between 1895 and 1903.

== History ==
The Charleville Courier was printed and published by J. Macnamara and was first published in October 1895. Each issue was accompanied by supplements.

== Digitisation ==
The paper has been digitised as part of the Australian Newspapers Digitisation Program of the National Library of Australia.

== See also ==
- List of newspapers in Australia
