= The Walhalla Chronicle and Moondarra Advertiser =

Former newspaper in Victoria, Australia

Walhalla and Moondarra Advertiser

The Walhalla Chronicle and Moondarra Advertiser, also published as the Walhalla Chronicle, was a newspaper published in Walhalla, Victoria, Australia from 1914 to 1915.

== Digitisation ==
The Walhalla Chronicle and the Walhalla Chronicle and Advertiser have been digitised and are available on Trove, as part of the Australian Newspapers Digitisation Project of the National Library of Australia.

== See also ==
- List of newspapers in Australia
