= Bayside Bulletin =

Former newspaper in Queensland, Australia

The Bayside Bulletin was a newspaper published in Cleveland, Redland City, Queensland, Australia.

== History ==
The first issue was published on 28 August 1984, after which it was published weekly on Tuesday until the final issue on 24 June 2014. It was published by Redland Publishers.

On 2 July 2014, it merged with the Redland Times to form the Redland City Bulletin.
