= Whitsunday Coast Guardian =

Australian online newspaper

The Whitsunday Coast Guardian
- Front page of The Proserpine Guardian, 16 February 1935
- Type: Online newspaper (formerly print)
- Owner(s): News Corp (formerly ADHOC, APN Australian Regional News, and private ownership)
- Founder: Raymund Atkinson Field
- Publisher: News Corp
- Founded: 1904 (as The Proserpine Guardian)
- Ceased publication: June 2020 (print editions)
- Language: English
- Headquarters: Main Street, Proserpine Canegrower's Executive building
- City: Proserpine
- Country: Australia

The Whitsunday Coast Guardian is a newspaper published in Proserpine, Whitsunday Region, Queensland, Australia.

== History ==
From 1904 to 1997, the newspaper was published in Proserpine as The Proserpine Guardian. From 1997 to 2007 its title was The Guardian. From 2007 its title became Whitsunday Coast Guardian.

The Proserpine Guardian was first published in 1904 by Raymund Atkinson Field. At first it was known as Proserpine Guardian and the Planter's Advocate but the Planter's Advocate name was dropped from the title after a couple of years.

No original copies exist from 1904 to 1911 except for the 'brown paper' issue, dated May 6, 1905. That week the supply of newsprint did not arrive on the boat which came up the Proserpine River from Mackay. The Guardian went out just the same but printed on brown paper, the rolls of which probably came from a local (Jupp's) store. Proserpine Museum holds two copies of this paper, as well as a framed copy which is on display at the museum.

Proserpine Museum also has photocopies of 1911 and 1912 editions of The Guardian and one issue from December, 1913. There are none from the war years, 1914 to 1918. The next copies are from 1919 and follow on until 1926. There are also copies from 1928, but none from 1927 or 1929.

In the early days of printing, sheets of newspaper were fed by hand and the press was driven by a petrol engine. Robert Scott, previously editor of Ravenswood Mining Journal, bought out The Proserpine Guardian in 1910, taking over in 1911 when he moved his Wharfdale Printing Press and his premises to Proserpine in Duncan Buchanan's bullock-drawn wagon, setting up in Proserpine's Main Street. Robert Scott died in 1915 and his widow, Angelina, along with their sons, took over the business. Son Alan installed the first linotype setting machine in 1928. A new concrete premise opened on the same site in 1937.

In July 1945, Major Alan Spence, an experienced printer, with his wife Dorothy, purchased the business. Major Spence was the holder of a Distinguished Service Order for his part in 'Sparrow Force' in Timor, defending the airfield against the Japanese. In the 1950s a new automatic printer, a Thompson Platen, was purchased. In 1960 the Spences sold to Mary & Bernie Lewis and Stan & Maureen Busuttin.

Not long after this change of owners a new Model 14 linotype machine was delivered. It was replaced in 1976 by computers and, in the 1990s, the Model 14 was donated to Proserpine Museum where it remains a central exhibit. Bernie and Mary Lewis and their son Peter and his wife, Cynthia, took full control of the business in 1972 and in 1974 moved the printery to a much larger premises at 16 Chapman Street in Proserpine.

The Guardian was the first country newspaper north of Brisbane to introduce the cold-type method of typesetting and printing. In later years the master copy was taken to Bowen, a distance of some sixty-five kilometres, rolled off the press at the Bowen Independent, and delivered back to Proserpine late at night before the day of the paper's sale. The Lewis family, however, continued to print brochures and flyers on a three-unit wet off-set printing press, purchased in 1989. Ultimately the paper's title was changed to Whitsunday Coast Guardian.

Mary Lewis died in July 2010 and Bernie Lewis followed on April 6, 2011, aged 93 years, two days after compiling his last editorial. In September 2014 the Whitsunday Coast Guardian, after being privately owned for 110 years and being one of the few remaining like businesses, was sold by Cynthia and Peter Lewis to ADHOC, APN Australian Regional News. This company still widely covers the local Proserpine and district news. The new premises are back in Main Street, in Proserpine Canegrower's Executive building.

The newspaper was published weekly on Wednesdays and was owned by APN News & Media.

Along with many other regional Australian newspapers owned by NewsCorp, the newspaper ceased print editions in June 2020 and became an online-only publication from 26 June 2020.

== Digitisation ==
Issues of The Proserpine Guardian from 1935 to 1954 have been digitised and are available through Trove.

== See also ==
- List of newspapers in Australia
