= Ballarat Synagogue =

Modern Orthodox synagogue in Victoria, Australia

Coordinates: 37.86102009548239°S 144.99050071457705°E

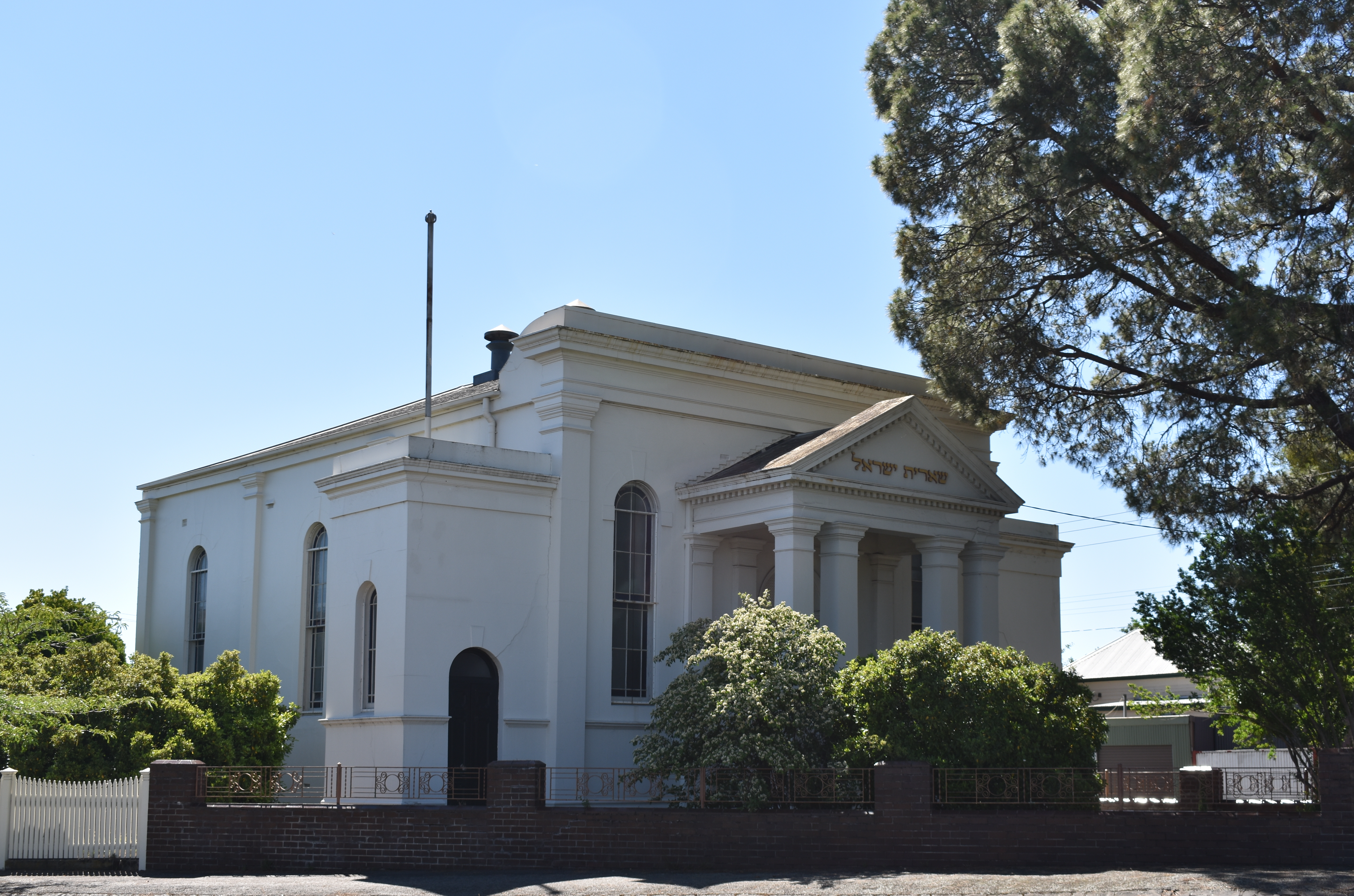

Religion
- Affiliation: Modern Orthodox Judaism
- Year consecrated: 1861
- Status: Active

Location
- Location: Princes Street & Barkly Street, Ballarat VIC 3350, Australia
- Interactive map of Ballarat Synagogue

Architecture
- Architect: TB Cameron
- Type: Synagogue
- Style: Neoclassical
- Completed: 1861

Victorian Heritage Register
- Official name: Ballarat Synagogue Complex
- Type: Registered place; Registered object integral to a registered place
- Criteria: a, d
- Reference no.: VHR H0106
- Heritage Overlay Number: HO8
- Category: Religion

Ballarat Synagogue is a Modern Orthodox synagogue situated in Ballarat East in Victoria, Australia. It is the oldest continuously used synagogue in mainland Australia.

== History ==
British Jews were among a flood of migrants that were drawn to the goldfields of Ballarat. European Jewry, escaping antisemitism at home, also settled in the city. Two groups of German Jewish migrants arrived in the 1850s, and 1860s, and again in the 1930s. Jewish refugees from pogroms in Eastern Europe arrived in the 1880s and 1890s.

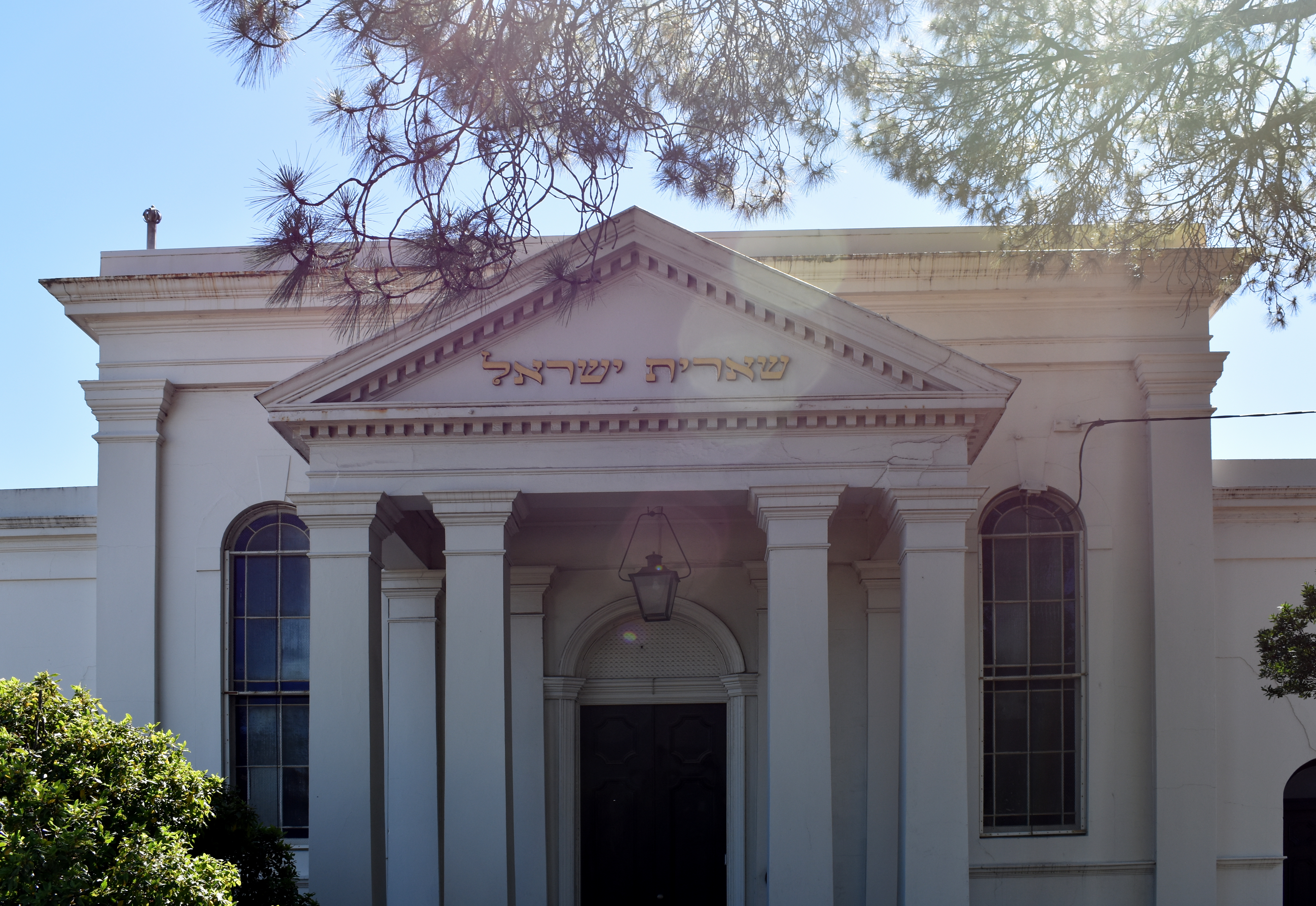
Shearit Yisrael – Remnant of Israel

The first minyan was established in 1853 for observing the High Holidays. The writer and Ballarat native, Nathan Spielvogel wrote a personal account:

It is Tuesday evening, 11 October 1853, Tishri 9 5614. Clad in the red shirt and high boots of the digger the cantor who learned his chazonos in a far away Lemberg, solemnly and tunefully chants Oshmanu. The thoughts of the worshipped drift back to the homes and kindred they have left behind on the other side of the world. With bowed heads they follow his lead repeating with the chazzan his confession, beating their breasts as they had been taught in their distant house of worship ... a remnant of Israel, albeit a very small one, proudly remembers Kol Nidrei night.

The Ballarat Hebrew Congregation was founded in 1855 and it occupied a small synagogue building with a capacity for 200. The first synagogue was consecrated on 12 November 1855. Rev David Isaacs of Geelong was the first lay leader of the congregation. The congregation soon had to find a new home, as in 1856, the local Municipal Council reclaimed the land that the synagogue was built on, to house its Municipal Chambers. The larger, current building was consecrated in 1861. The British architect, TB Cameron designed the new synagogue, using a Neoclassical style.

The new site posed issues as squatters had claimed the land, paying taxes and rates. Therefore, the congregation had to buy out the squatters. The ark from the original synagogue is housed in the congregation's communal hall.

At the height of the goldrush, around twenty-five percent of Ballarat's shopkeepers were Jewish, many were members of the synagogue.

The congregation employed a permanent rabbi until 1943. For several decades, the synagogue was only open for High Holiday Services. However, since 2009, the synagogue hosts monthly Shabbat services.

In recent years, the synagogue underwent a $300,000 AUD renovation. This was funded by Heritage Victoria, private donors and Jewish organisations in Melbourne.

== Notable members ==
- Nathan Spielvogel, a short-story writer. His parents married at the synagogue and he had his Bar Mitzvah there in 1887. He later served as President of the congregation.
- Charles Dyte, a Jewish parliamentarian and founding member
- Newman Rosenthal, academic and editor of The Australian Jewish Herald

== See also ==
- List of synagogues in Australia and New Zealand
- History of the Jews in Australia
