= Southern Star (Brisbane) =

- Owner: Quest Community Newspapers
- Headquarters: Brisbane, Queensland
- Website: http://southern-star.whereilive.com.au

The Southern Star is a local newspaper for Brisbane in Australia. It is owned and run by the Quest Community Newspapers group.
