= Mortlake Dispatch =

The Mortlake Dispatch is a newspaper published in Mortlake, Victoria, Australia.

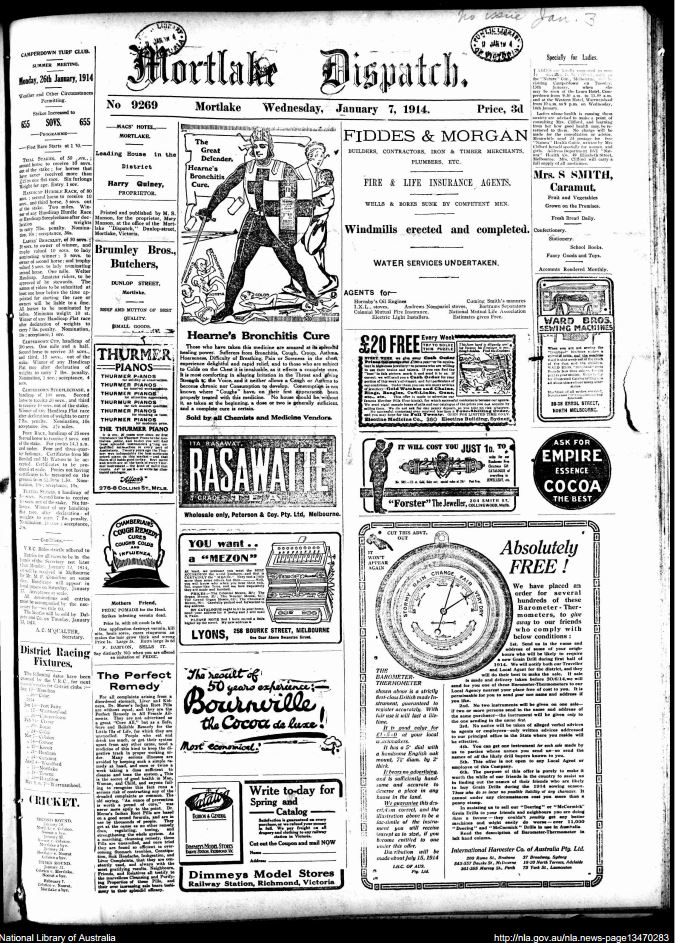
Front page of Mortlake Dispatch, 7 January 1914

== History ==
The Mortlake Dispatch was first published in 1869 using the title Mortlake Dispatch: and commercial, agricultural, and pastoral advertiser. By 1883, William Manson was the owner and in 1884 the newspaper name was shortened and the subtitle removed. Following William's death in 1903, his son John William Manson became editor. Within a few years John also died and his sister Mary Swinton Manson became the printer and publisher and her mother Mary Manson was the proprietor. Mary Swinton Manson married William Bray who became the newspaper proprietor on her death in 1943. On William's death in 1962 ownership passed to William and Mary Swinton's daughter Bonds Manson Bray. In 1967 records indicate that Miss Bray sold the newspaper to Ian Barker (Dandenong Journal, Foster Mirror) before the Western District Newspapers took over ownership in 1970.

== Digitisation ==
The paper has been digitised as part of the Australian Newspapers Digitisation Program of the National Library of Australia.

== See also ==
- List of newspapers in Australia
