= South-West News =

Suburban newspaper published in Brisbane, Queensland, Australia

- Owner(s): News Corporation
- Founded: 1985
- Headquarters: Brisbane, Queensland

The South-West News is a suburban newspaper published in Brisbane, Queensland, Australia. It is one of 16 suburban newspapers published in Brisbane and surrounding areas by Quest Newspapers which is owned by News Corporation.

It was published as a weekly newspaper since 1985 and was delivered free to homes in the target group of suburbs and depends on advertising from mostly local businesses for its income. In 2020, it became an online newspaper only.
