= Nathan Spielvogel =

(1874–1956) teacher, writer and historian

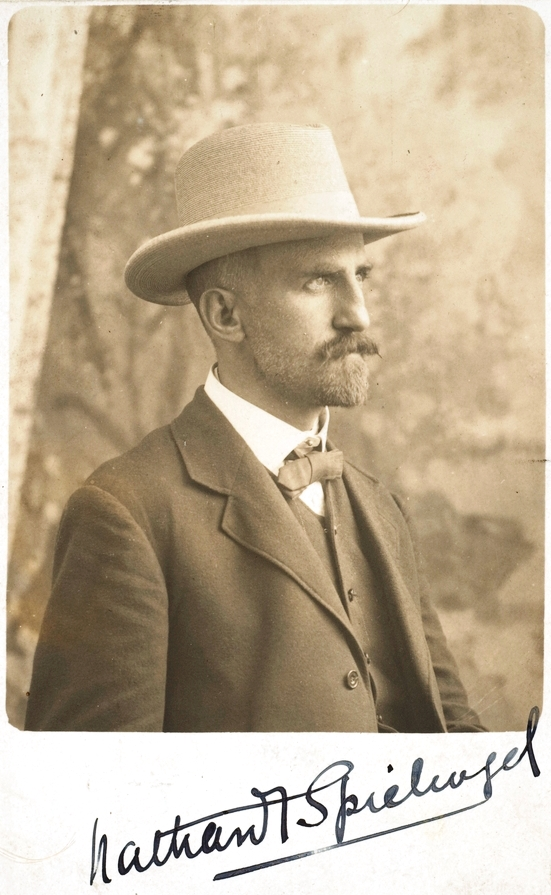
- Nathan Spielvogel c. 1925
- Born: Nathan Frederick Spielvogel; 10 May 1874; Ballarat, Victoria, Australia
- Died: 10 September 1956 (aged 82); Ballarat, Victoria, Australia
- Occupations: short story writer; historian; humorist; schoolteacher; school principal
- Writing career
- Language: English

Nathan Frederick Spielvogel (10 May 1874 – 10 September 1956) was an Australian author of Jewish origin, whose work has been compared to that of Judah Waten.

== Early life ==
Spielvogel was born in Ballarat, Victoria, a son of Neuman Frederik (c. 1830 – 29 October 1891) and Hannah Spielvogel née Cohen (c. 1844 – 21 January 1901). His father, generally called "Newman", was a tailor and pawnbroker, born in Kolomea, Galizia, Austria (now in western Ukraine) and his mother in Chodsiesen, Prussia (now in Poland). They married at Ballarat Synagogue on 25 December 1867.

Spielvogel was educated at Dana Street State School, Ballarat, and had his Bar Mitzvah at Ballarat Synagogue on 21 May 1887.

== Career ==
His first published poem, "Mike Hardy's Fate" was published in the Ballarat Courier of 1894, and in 1898 The Bulletin began publishing his verses and stories under several noms de plume.

He taught in various Victorian rural schools, including Dimboola, Orbost Longwood, where a whispering campaign accused him of being German, Mitcham, Wangaratta, and back to his old school at Dana Street, Ballarat, retiring in 1939.

His Jewish identity was also part of his writing. In 1903, six years after the First Zionist Congress and the stirrings of Zionism, he published his ballad, The Wandering Jew in The Bulletin:

But I was born in this Southland sweet
In it to manhood grown
I love this land, as I love my life
I call this land mine own.
Yet here tonight my blood runs mad,
To go with these and roam
To wander off with these gaunt grim ghosts
That ever seek a home.
And so tonight, while the gum trees sigh
I take my staff and go:
I give myself to the Wanderlust
That is both friend and foe.
Hot lava leaps in my blood tonight,
My wandering sires go by;
I hear the call of the Wandering Jew
And I must go or die

In 1904, he visited Egypt, England, Germany, France, Italy and Switzerland, writing of his experiences in A Gumsucker on the Tramp, "gumsucker" being a colloquialism for a country Victorian. The book sold 10,000 copies and encouraged him to write another book, The Cocky Farmer.

He contributed to The Lone Hand, The Bulletin, and Dimboola Banner as "Genung", "Eko", "Ato", "Ahaswar".

== Personal life ==
He fell in love with a non-Jewish woman, but following his mother's wishes married Jessie Muriel Harris, daughter of Henry Harris (publisher of the Hebrew Standard) at the Great Synagogue, Sydney on 6 September 1911.

On Thursdays he dined at Fasoli's restaurant with the writers and artists, E.J. Brady, Hal Gye, Louis Esson, C. J. Dennis and Norman Lindsay.

=== Family ===
Spielvogel had two brothers: Frederick Isaac Spielvogel (27 December 1868 – 1947) and Solomon "Sol" Spielvogel (14 November 1875 – 6 September 1958)

He had three sons with Harris, Laurie, Bill and Phil:

- Newman Laurence Spielvogel (4 March 1913 – ) known as Laurie, passed his qualifying examination at age nine, a record.
- Lassalle Harris Spielvogel (12 June 1914 – ) known as William?
- Frederick Phillip Spielvogel (28 March 1916 – ) known as Phillip.

All three married outside the Jewish faith and away from Ballarat.

His grandson Dennis Spielvogel (1953–2020), the youngest of three brothers, was a member of the Ballarat & District Genealogical Society and founding president of the Bungaree Historical Society.

== Writings ==
=== Published works ===
- A Gumsucker on the Tramp (1905), on his travels through Europe and Egypt
- The Cocky Farmer (1907)
- The Gumsucker at Home (1913)
- Our Gum Trees (verse, 1913)
- The Affair at Eureka (1928), a popular history of the Eureka Stockade
- Old Eko's Notebook (1930), reflections on his life as a country teacher
- The Call of the Wandering Jew (1940)
- Selected Stories of Nathan Spielvogel (1956)
- The Spielvogel Papers, vol I (articles and radio talks 1974)
- The Spielvogel Papers, vol II (articles and radio talks 1981)

=== Miscellaneous ===
- The Wandering Jew, no doubt the source of his pseudonym "Ahaswar".
- From around 1920 he wrote a monthly piece for the Victorian Teachers' Journal
- A history of the Ballarat Hebrew congregation 1855–1928

== Other interests ==
- He was a keen chess player
- He was intensely interested in the history of the Ballarat area, and longtime president of the Ballarat Historical Society.
- After his retirement, he was heavily involved with the local museum.
- He was both an intensely patriotic Australian and a committed Jew.
