= Nathalia Herald =

Former newspaper in Victoria, Australia

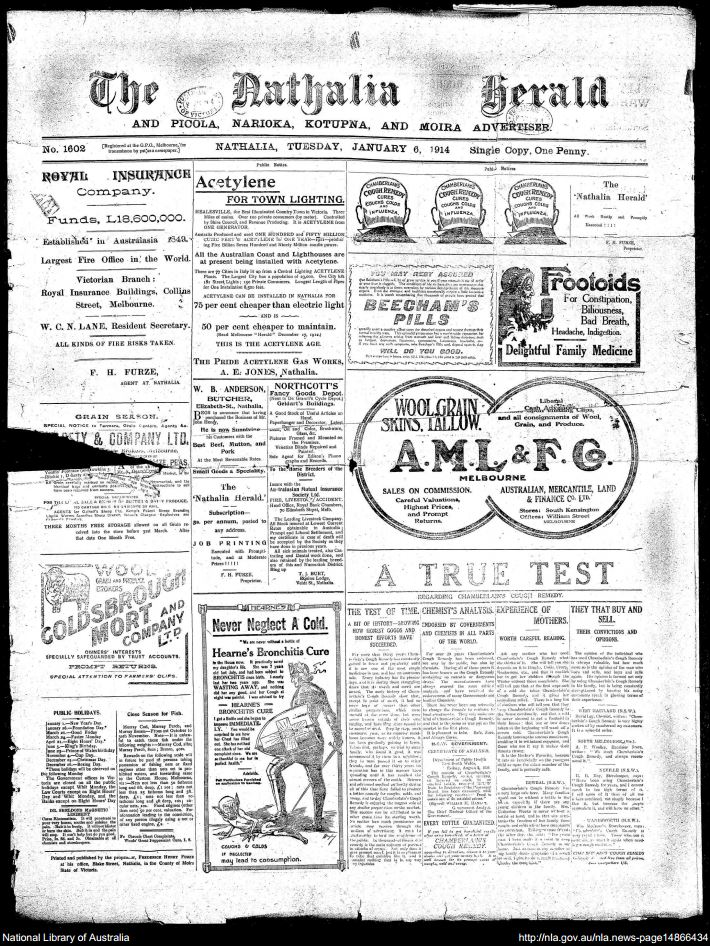
Front page of Nathalia Herald, Tuesday January 6, 1914

The Nathalia Herald was a newspaper published in Nathalia, Victoria, Australia.

== History ==
Nathalia's first newspaper, the Nathalia Herald and Picola, Narioka, and Moire Advertiser was initiated from Numurkah in 1884. In 1890, Frederick Henry Furze, who had lived most of his life in the district bought the Herald. At the beginning of summer 1899 a fire swept down Blake Street destroying plant and building, a fate every owner dreaded. The Herald was in operation from 1884 until 1975.

== Digitised ==
The Nathalia Herald and Picola, Narioka, Kotupna and Moira Advertiser (Vic. : 1914 - 1918) has been digitised by the National Library of Australia.

== See also ==
- List of newspapers in Australia
