= Meie Kodu =

Estonian diaspora newspaper

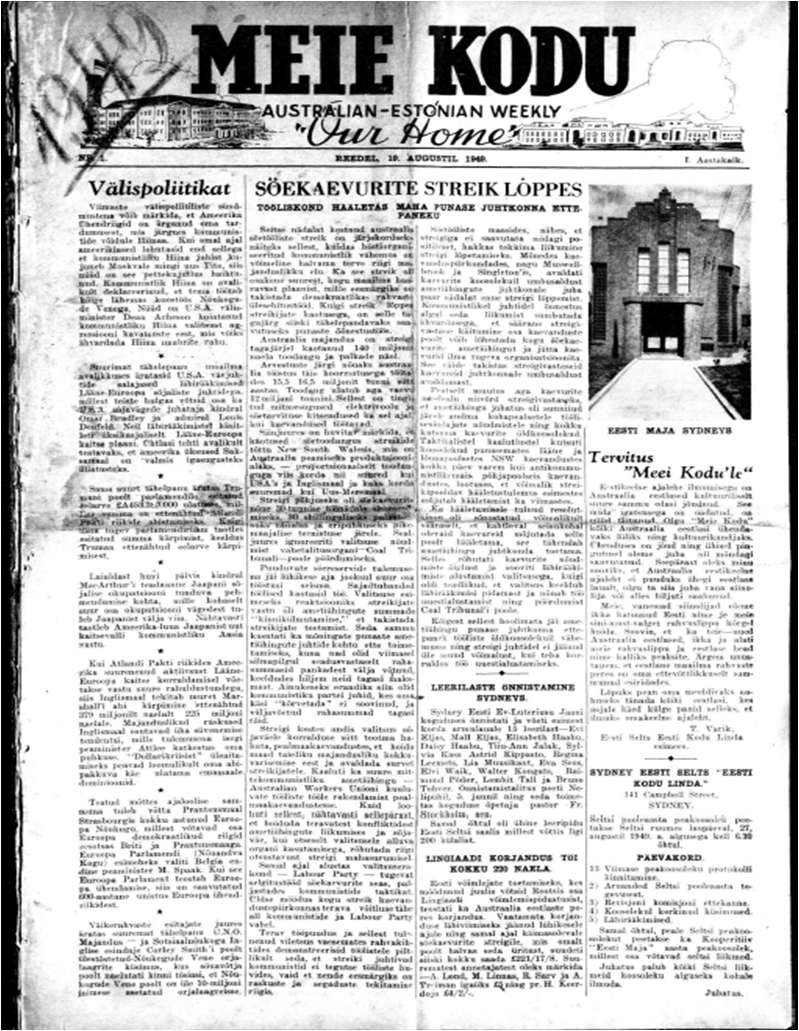
Meie Kodu 19 August 1949

Meie Kodu (English: Our Home) is an Estonian language newspaper published in Sydney, New South Wales, Australia, from 1949.

== History ==
Meie Kodu was first published on August 14, 1949, by Estonian immigrants. The Estonian community in Australia in 1949 was estimated to be approximately 3,000 people. Most Estonians who arrived in Australia following the end of World War Two came as 'Displaced Persons' or refugees who were leaving their homeland following the imposition of Soviet rule in 1944.

Typical of other non-English language newspapers in Australia, Meie Kodu played an important role in keeping newly arrived Estonians aware of the domestic situation in Estonia and also played an important role in providing information useful for daily living in their adopted home of Australia - "...to acquaint readers with the life of Estonians here, their working conditions as well as their social activities, their political status and their hopes, in order to lighten our countrymen’s task of settling to a new life”. The 'information useful for daily living in their adopted home of Australia' has been replaced by reports on Estonian community activities in all States and Territories of Australia.

The paper was published initially as a weekly but started fortnightly publication from its 16 January 2013 issue. During its 70th year in 2019, Meie Kodu officially ceased publication.

== Digitisation ==
The paper has been digitised as part of the Australian Newspapers Digitisation Program.

== See also ==
- List of newspapers in Australia
- List of non-English-language newspapers in New South Wales
