= Wangaratta Chronicle =

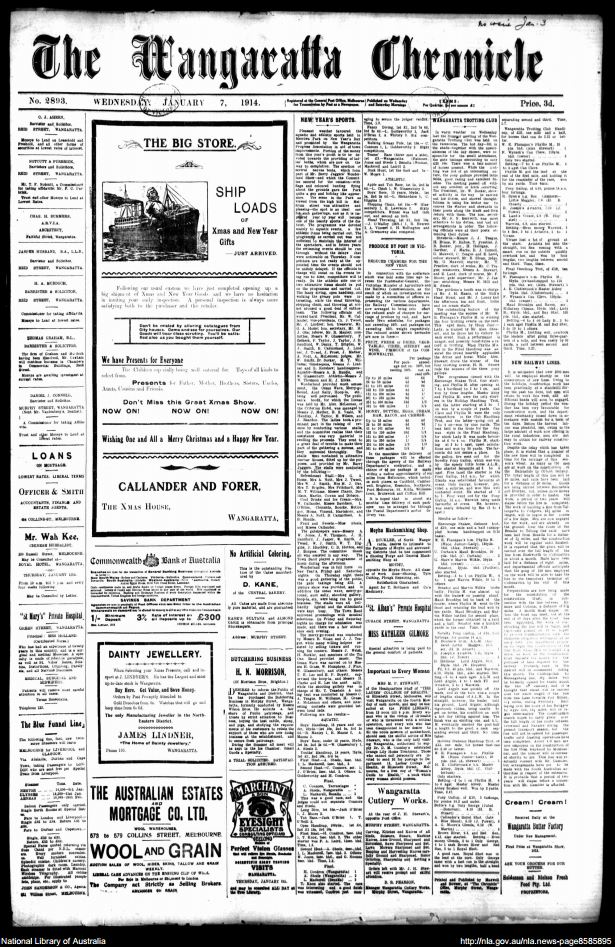
Front page of the Wangaratta Chronicle no. 2893 7 January 1914

The Wangaratta Chronicle is a newspaper published in Wangaratta, Victoria, Australia.

== History ==
On 10 September 1884 George Maxwell and John Bowser began the bi-weekly Wangaratta Chronicle. It was in competition with the Wangaratta and Benalla Despatch founded on 21 March 1862 by John Rowan. William Thomas (Bill) Higgins, an apprentice for the Chronicle from age 12, bought the Despatch from Reginald Grantley Norton on 1 January 1921. He had left the Chronicle position aged in his early Twenties to open a print shop and prepare for a career in journalism. These two papers were merged on 27 March 1937 and the newly formed Wangaratta Chronicle Despatch began circulating bi-weekly.

The Wangaratta Chronicle Despatch became a tri-weekly publication on 3 January 1950 and then became an afternoon publication on 2 July 1957. It became a Monday to Friday daily on 1 April 1958 and then on 27 September 1963 was no longer published on Wednesdays. It again became a tri-weekly publication from 29 December 1975.

Bill Higgins died on 20 March 1949 and his son, William Francis Higgins became his heir. The company is still owned by the Higgins family, managed by Edward Higgins, a fourth generation family member.

The Wangaratta Chronicle began to appear as a daily newspaper 1958 and is now published three times a week and offers digital access.

== Digitisation ==
This newspaper has been digitised as part of the Australian Newspaper Digitisation Project of the National Library Australia.

== See also ==
- List of newspapers in Australia
