= Snowy River Mail =

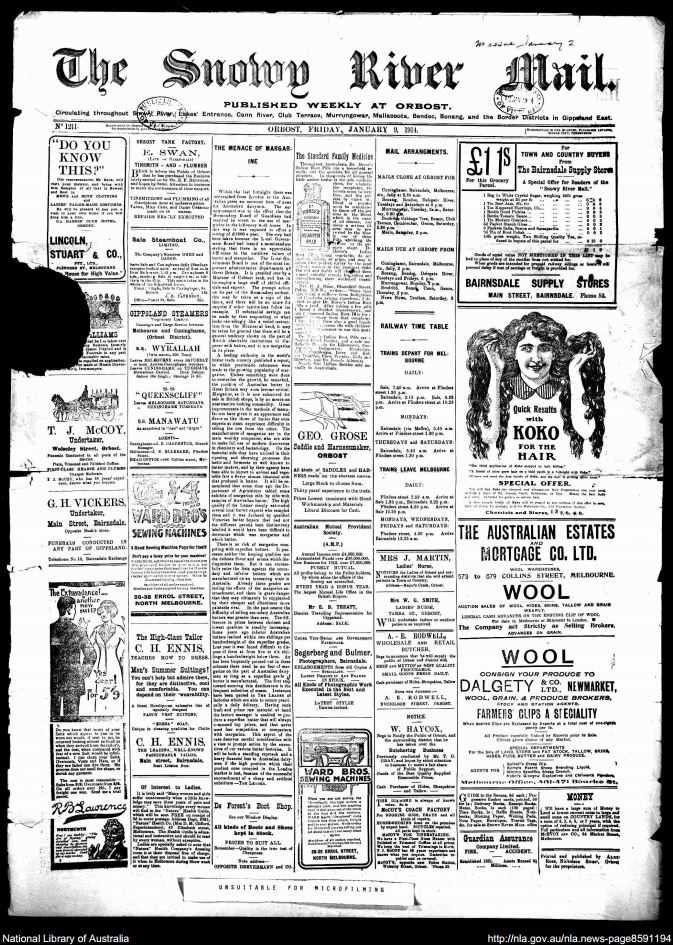
Snowy River Mail 9 January 1914

The Snowy River Mail is a weekly newspaper published in Orbost in the Shire of East Gippsland, Victoria, Australia.

== History ==
Previously published as The Snowy River Mail and Tambo and Croajingolong gazette from 1890 to 1911. The Gippsland Courier merged with the Snowy River Mail when proprietor Lachlan Ross moved to Orbost in 1910. In 1999 the paper was acquired by the Yeates family when the Hollins family retired from the newspapers business.

The paper is still being produced by the fourth generation of the Yeates family as part of East Gippsland Newspapers. They also produce the Bairnsdale Advertiser, the East Gippsland News and the Lakes Post and the yearly publications East Gippsland Visitor Guide and the Great Alpine Road Touring Guide.

== Digitisation ==
Issues No. 1211 (January 9, 1914)-no. 1460 (December 20, 1918) of the paper were digitised as part of the Australian Newspapers Digitisation Program of the National Library of Australia.

Current articles from 2013 can be found online at the EastVicMedia website.

== See also ==
- List of newspapers in Australia
