= Sameway Magazine =

Australian newspaper

- Type: Fortnightly Chinese newspaper
- Format: Tabloid
- Owner: Rejoice Chinese Christian Communication Centre Inc
- Publisher: Creative Every Day
- Editor-in-chief: Raymond Chow
- Founded: September 2004
- Language: Traditional Chinese, English
- Headquarters: 20 Station St, Nunawading, Vic 3131, Australia
- Circulation: 17,000
- ISSN: 1839-7913
- OCLC number: 435778508
- Website: www.sameway.com.au

Sameway Magazine (Chinese: 同路人; pinyin: Tónglùrén) is a Chinese-language fortnightly tabloid-format newspaper published in Melbourne in Victoria (Australia).

It was first published as a magazine in September 2004, and is currently printed fortnightly in three editions. Different editions are available in Adelaide, Melbourne and Sydney/Brisbane. An insert is included under the name of Sameway Magazine Leisure. As of 31 March 2012, the newspaper had an audited circulation of 17,000 each week.

The majority of the magazine is in Traditional Chinese, with some articles and the editorial in English.

The magazine is also available online (ISSN 1839-7921) from issue #271.

== History ==
Since inception Raymond Chow has been the editor.

The head office of Sameway Magazine has relocated from a former premises in Kingsway, Glen Waverley to a new office complex at Suite 7, 1F 2-8 Burwood Hwy, Burwood East, Victoria. In 2015 the head office again relocated to 67 Mahoneys Rd, Forest Hill, Victoria. At the end of 2019 the office again relocated to 1f/1 Walkers Rd, Nunawading, Victoria. In 2026 the office relocated to 20 Station St, Nunawading, Victoria.

The format of Sameway Magazine has changed from glossy magazine cover and features to newsprint, and the tabloid size has been altered with change to new printing contractors.

Sameway Magazine was a publication of Rejoice Chinese Christian Communication Centre Inc. The publisher changed to Creative Every Day in 2012.

The Sydney/Brisbane and Adelaide editions were commenced with issue #100.

In 2019 Sameway Magazine changed from a weekly to a fortnightly publication.

== See also ==
- List of newspapers in Australia
- List of non-English-language newspapers in New South Wales
