= Independent (Launceston) =

Newspaper published in Launceston, Tasmania from 1831 to 1835

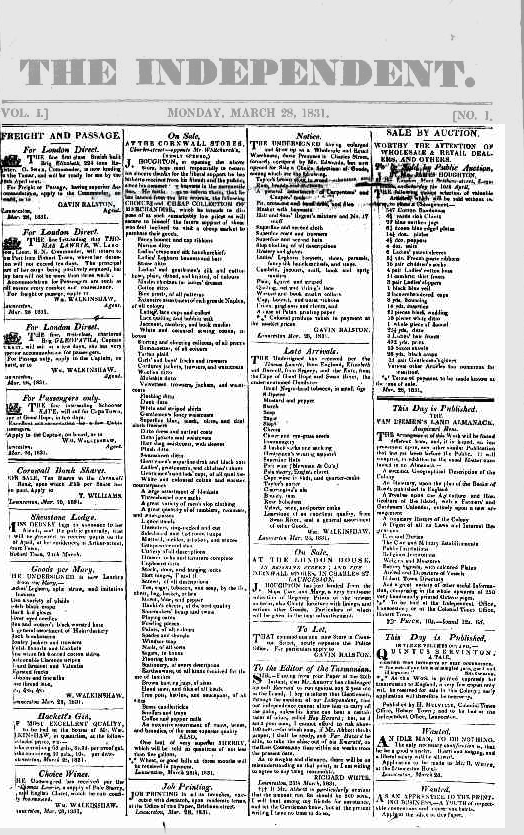
Front page of the Independent (Launceston) in Tasmania, 28 March 1831

The Independent was a weekly English language newspaper published in Launceston, Tasmania from 1831 to 1835.

== History ==
Commencing on 28 March 1831, the Independent was published initially on Mondays, and briefly on Wednesdays, until 9 May 1831. From 18 May 1831, it was published on Saturdays continuously until 31 January 1835.

Located in Brisbane Street, Launceston, the Independent's first publisher was Samuel Bailey Dowsett who had previous experience as the publisher of the Cornwall press and commercial advertiser.

In 1831, the publisher of the Launceston Advertiser, John Pascoe Fawkner, engaged in a rivalry with the Independent. Both Fawkner and Dowsett used their newspaper columns for heated, personal exchanges.

The Independent's office in Brisbane Street, Launceston, served as an agent for the Hobart-based newspapers: Colonial Times and The Tasmanian. On 5 May 1832, Dowsett wrote an article in the Independent to farewell the editor of the Tasmanian, R L Murray, on his retirement.

After leaving the Independent, in 1833, Dowsett joined The Sydney Morning Herald, and later The Australian newspaper.

When the Independent ceased publication on 31 January 1835, the publisher at that time, William Mann, immediately started the Cornwall Chronicle: commercial, agricultural, and naval register in Launceston.

== Digitisation ==
The paper has been digitised as part of the Australian Newspapers Digitisation Program project of the National Library of Australia. The microfilm copies are held in the collection of LINC Tasmania.
