= Whitsunday Times =

Weekly newspaper in Queensland, Australia

The Whitsunday Times
- Type: Weekly newspaper
- Format: Tabloid
- Owner(s): News Corp Australia
- Language: English
- Headquarters: Whitsunday Shire
- Website: whitsundaytimes.com.au

The Whitsunday Times was a weekly newspaper covering the Whitsunday Shire in North Queensland, Australia. It continues on as digital-only masthead.

Its circulation area included Airlie Beach, Cannonvale, Proserpine, Bowen and surrounding suburbs and islands.

It was published every Thursday, and an average of 7,342 copies were distributed, sold or home delivered across the region.

It was published by News Corp Australia. It was formerly printed by Mackay Printing and Publishing, part of APN News & Media.

== History ==
It was founded in 1981 under the Airlie and Island News masthead.

Along with many other regional Australian newspapers owned by News Corp, the newspaper ceased print editions in June 2020 and became an online-only publication from 26 June 2020.

== Holdings ==
- Whitsunday times, Queensland Parliamentary Library, 1983
- "Whitsunday times", The Times, 1983
