= Redland City Bulletin =

Newspaper published in Cleveland, Queensland, Australia

- Type: Weekly newspaper
- Owner: Australian Community Media
- Founded: 2014
- Language: English
- City: Redland City, Queensland
- Website: redlandcitybulletin.com.au

Redland City Bulletin is a newspaper published in the City of Redland, Queensland, Australia. It is published weekly from Cleveland and is owned by Australian Community Media.

== History ==
The newspaper commenced on 2 July 2014 following the amalgamation of the Redland Times and Bayside Bulletin. Part of Fairfax Media, it was acquired in July 2018 by Nine Entertainment following a merger. In April 2019, Nine Entertainment sold most of the newspapers it acquired through the merger (including Redland City Bulletin) to Australian Community Media.
