= Dimboola Banner =

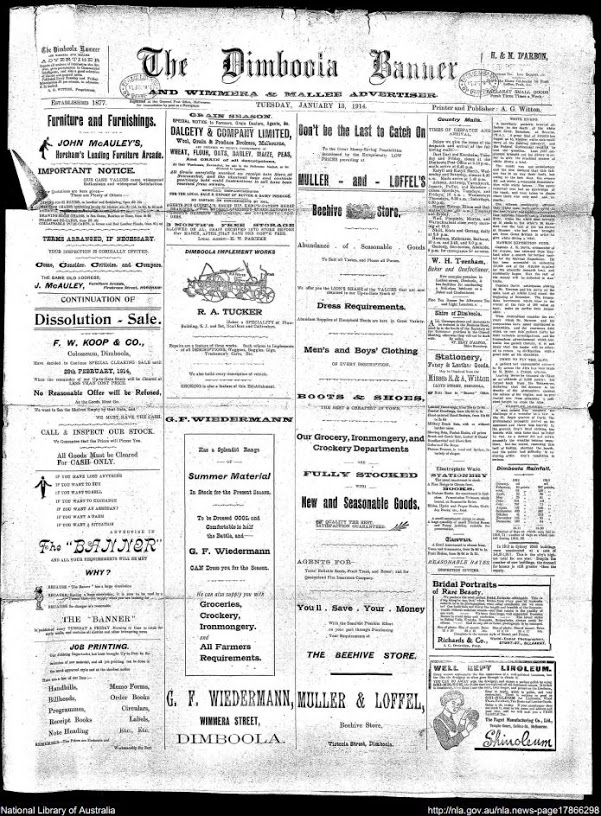
Front page of the Dimboola Banner 13 January 1914

The Dimboola Banner, a regional newspaper covering the Western District in Victoria. The Dimboola Banner is the voice of the community covering local news, sport and business.

== History ==
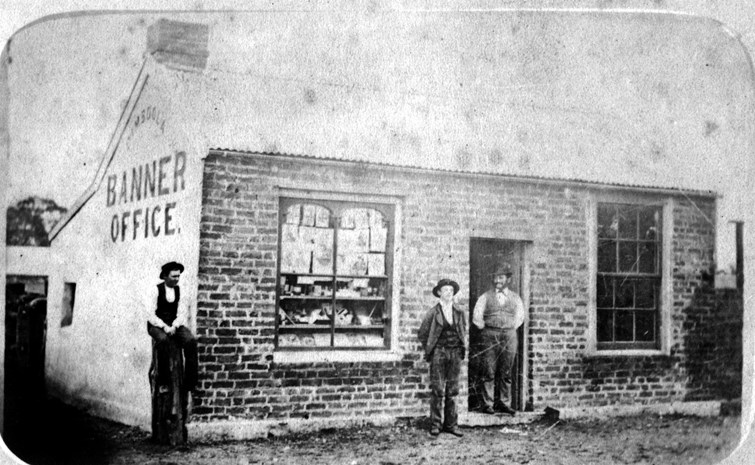
the original printing office of The Dimboola Banner

The Dimboola Banner has a publishing history of nearly 135 years. The first issue was published on 10 May 1879. After successful years of publishing a takeover bid was made in 1921, the bid failed and an opposing newspaper, Dimboola Chronicle, went into publication. The Banner remained robust and absorbed the Chronicle in 1930.

The Dimboola Printing Museum showcases printing machinery from a bygone era.

== Digitisation ==
This paper had been digitised as part of the Australian Digitisation program of the National Library of Australia.

== See also ==
- List of newspapers in Australia
