= The Free Press, Cambridge =

Pub in Cambridge, England

Coordinates: 52°12′17.15″N 0°7′49.61″E

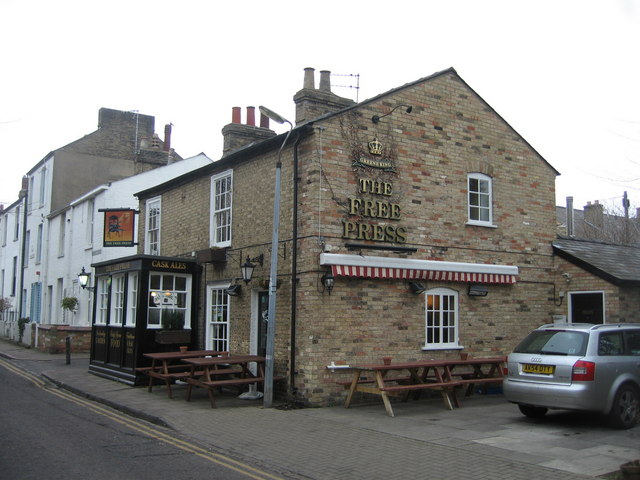
The Free Press

The Free Press is a pub in Prospect Row, Cambridge, England. At 30 square feet (2.8 m^{2}), it is "surely the smallest pub room in Cambridgeshire" and its fittings are either original from the 1940s or copies. It is on the Regional Inventory of Historic Pub Interiors for East Anglia.
