= Noosa Journal =

Former newspaper in Queensland, Australia

The Noosa Journal was a local newspaper, for Noosa, Australia. It was purchased by News Limited in 2006. It was closed by the company in 2012.
