= Daylesford Advocate =

Former newspaper in Victoria, Australia

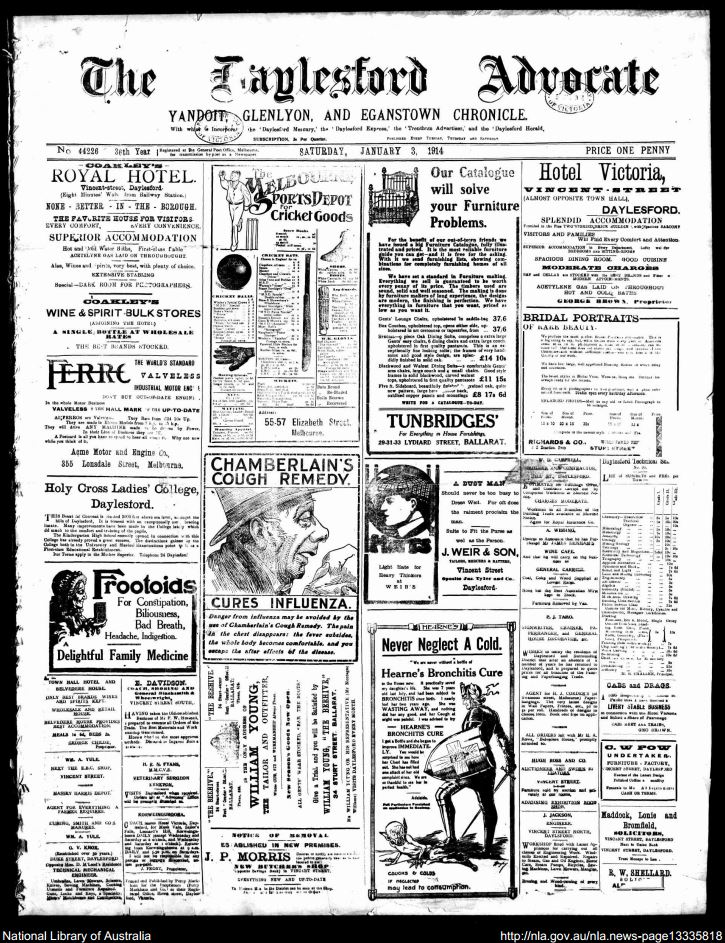
Daylesford Advocate, 3 January 1914

The Daylesford Advocate was a Victorian newspaper first published in 1878 as The Daylesford Advocate and Hepburn Glenlyon and Blanket Flat Chronicle.

== History ==
An earlier incarnation, the Daylesford Advocate and Hepburn Courier, was briefly published by James Shelton Brocklehurst in April 1859, but it closed in December 1860 due to competition from the newly launched The Daylesford Express and Hepburn Advertiser. As in many country towns, competition and absorption of weaker titles by stronger titles saw the incorporation by the Advocate of the Mercury & Express (1880) and the Herald (1909).

The paper ceased publication without explanation in March 2020 as a result of the COVID-19 pandemic.

== Digitisation ==
This newspaper has been digitised as part of the Australian Newspaper Digitisation Program.
