= Tango Live =

Messaging application software for smartphones

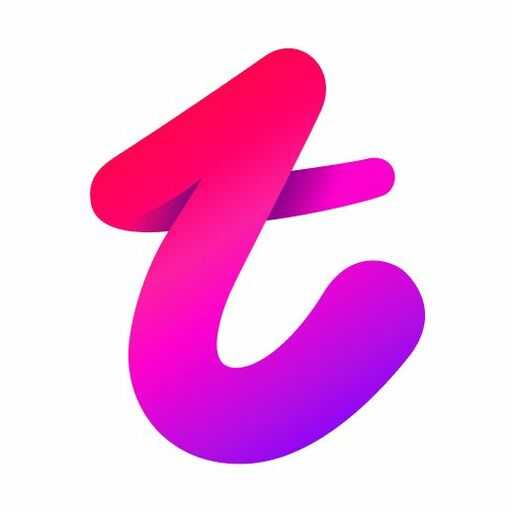
- Developers: TangoME, Inc.
- Operating system: Android, web browsers, iOS
- Type: Social live-streaming platform, Voice over IP, instant messaging, videoconferencing
- License: Proprietary
- Website: www.tango.me

Tango is a third-party, cross platform messaging and live-streaming application software for smartphones developed by TangoME, Inc. based in the United States.

Tango was first developed in 2009 as an instant messaging application. The app was free and began as one of the first providers of video calls, texting, photo sharing, and games on a 3G network.

In 2017, Tango entered the live-streaming space. Since then, it gradually transformed itself into a B2C platform for Live Video Broadcasts, combining high-quality video streaming, live messaging chat and digital economy.

Because of controversies resulted from the live-streaming content and digital economy, the Tango app is no longer available on the Apple App Store since 2026.

Raz, one of the founders, currently serves as the CEO of Tango.

== History ==
=== Instant Messaging Application ===
Tango, based in Mountain View, California, was founded in September 2009, by Uri Raz and Eric Setton, when Smartphone started to enter the market, creating a need for instant messaging (IM) application on mobile device. As a competitor in the IM services market, Tango adopted a different strategy to its competitors like Whatsapp by providing richer contents than simple text and photo messaging. For example, Tango introduced an in-app game platform as well as partnered with Spotify for music sharing at the early 2010s. In February 2017, Tango added integration with GIF platform Gfycat, allowing users to search and send GIFs.

Tango was successful in raising capital in its initial phase of development. The founders raised venture capital from a range of investors such as Draper Fisher Jurvetson and Len Blavatnik. A financing round in March 2014 also brought in $280 million from Alibaba, Yahoo co-founder Jerry Yang and other investors.

In 2018, Tango had more than 400 million registered users. It was rated by PCMag as "the simplest mobile chat application out there, with a good range of support."

=== Live-streaming Platform ===
Unable to gain a significant market share in the instant messaging services market, Tango entered the live-streaming market in 2017. Since then, it gradually changed into a live-streaming application, serving as a B2C platform for Live Video Broadcasts. While keeping its instant messaging function, the function is combined with video streaming and digital economy, where audience can purchase virtual gifts and send them to broadcasting hosts.

During this transformation, Tango gradually adopt the "Tango Live" branding to reflect its new focus on user-generated live video broadcasts.

== Controversies ==
Tango became controversial since its transformation into a live-streaming platform. The virtual gifts function, where audience can purchase virtual gifts and send to broadcasting hosts, is utilized by scammers as a scamming platform. On the other hand, there is sexual content in live-streaming, where the age of the broadcasting hosts is just self-declared.

As a result, the Tango app was removed from the Apple App Store in 2026. In the European Union, its iOS version is distributed through Onside, a third-party iOS app marketplace operating under the Digital Markets Act. Onside also became available in Japan in February 2026.

== Logos ==
Old Logo of Tango

Old Logo of Tango on Phones
