= The North Central Review =

Weekly newspaper in Victoria, Australia

- Type: Weekly newspaper
- Format: Tabloid
- Owner: The North Central Review Pty Ltd
- Editor: Emily Waite
- Founded: 2004
- Headquarters: 3/87 Sydney Street; Kilmore, Victoria, Australia
- Website: Official website

The North Central Review is a weekly newspaper based in Kilmore, Australia published by The North Central Review Pty Ltd. The North Central Review primarily serves the north central areas of Victoria, from Wallan up to Puckapunyal and Seymour, and shares many articles with other NCR weekly newspapers. Some of the newspaper's articles are available digitally through its website. The newspaper currently has a weekly circulation of 14,426.

== See also ==
- The North Central Review Pty Ltd
