= The Evening Advocate =

Newspaper published in Innisfail, Australia

The Evening Advocate was a newspaper published in Innisfail, Queensland, Australia.

== Digitisation ==
The paper has been digitised as part of the Australian Newspapers Digitisation Program of the National Library of Australia.
