= Alexandra, Eildon, Marysville Standard =

Regional newspaper in Victoria, Australia

- Type: Weekly newspaper
- Owner(s): Alexandra Newspapers
- Founder(s): John Whitelaw
- Publisher: Celina Mott
- Editor: Anne Richey
- Managing editor: Karen Morrison
- Founded: June 2, 1868
- Headquarters: 43 Grant St, Alexandra VIC 3714
- Website: https://www.alexandranewspapers.com.au/

The Alexandra, Eildon, Marysville Standard is a newspaper published by Alexandra Newspapers in Victoria, Australia.

== History ==
The newspaper was first published biweekly as the Alexandra Times by John Whitelaw on 2 June 1868. In its first editorial the newspaper committed to "representing the commercial and mining interests of the district". The newspaper’s motto was veritas vincit omnia, truth conquers all.

The Alexandra Times became the Alexandra and Yea Standard in 1877. The Standard was known for its detailed recording of local affairs in the nineteenth century, including mining, farming and agriculture, especially dairy and timber milling. The newspaper later expanded to include Acheron, Eildon, Gobur, Taggerty, Thornton and Yarck and adopted its current name in March 1989.
