= South Burnett Times =

The South Burnett Times is an online newspaper published in Kingaroy, Queensland, Australia. It was published on Tuesdays and Fridays. The last edition was published on Friday, June 26, 2020.

== History ==
The South Burnett Times commenced publication in 1910 in Wondai, owned by the Wondai Newspaper Company. In July 1921 it was sold to a new company called South Burnett Newspaper Printing Company, but it retained J. C. Thompson as manager. From 6 October 1971 it was published in Kingaroy.

APN News and Media purchased the South Burnett Times, and sister publications the Central & North Burnett Times, Biggenden Weekly, Western Times and Blackall Leader, from the Collyer family in the mid-1990s.

The printing press was removed from the Kingaroy building in Haly Street, but reporters and office staff remained.

Ownership then passed to News Corp when it brought the regional media division of APN News and Media for $36.6 million in 2016.

Along with many other regional Australian newspapers owned by NewsCorp, the newspaper ceased print editions in June 2020 and became an online-only publication.
