= International Press Freedom Award =

International prizes for efforts to uphold the freedom of the press styled International Press Freedom Awards are awarded by two different bodies:

- CPJ International Press Freedom Awards, annually awarded by the Committee to Protect Journalists since 1991
- CJFE International Press Freedom Awards, annually awarded by Canadian Journalists for Free Expression since 1998
