= Ararat Advertiser =

Newspaper in Victoria, Australia

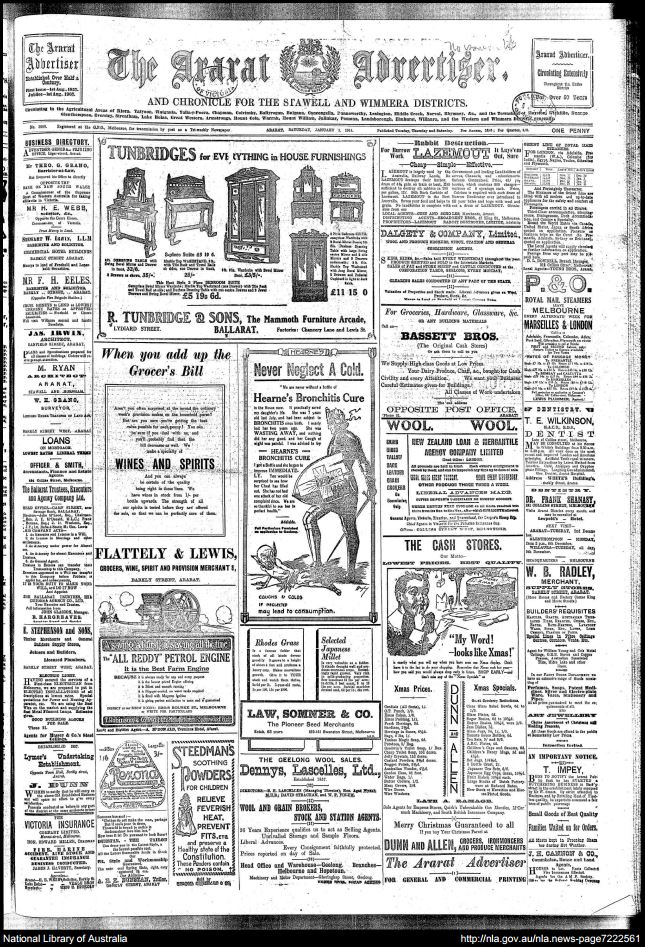
- Front page, Ararat Advertiser, 3 January 1914
- Type: Weekly newspaper
- Owner: Fairfax Media
- Founder(s): Jabez Walter Banfield; James Gearing; Edward Holt Nuthall
- Founded: 1 August 1857
- Language: English
- Website: westvicnews.com.au/the-ararat-advocate

The Ararat Advertiser is a newspaper published in Ararat, Victoria, Australia. It is one of the oldest continuously operating newspapers in Victoria, second in age only to the Geelong Advertiser. The paper is published by Fairfax Media.

== History ==
With the Liverpool printing industry facing periodic unemployment and worsening industrial conditions, formally trained printers and stationers Jabez Walter Banfield and James Gearing emigrated to Australia in search of gold. Arriving on 10 October 1852, they followed the Victorian gold rush to Melbourne, where they went into partnership with Edward Holt Nuthall, a printer recently arrived from India. In May 1855 the trio returned to the central goldfields to invest in a printing plant in Maryborough. Between 1855 and 1864 Banfield and Gearing were associated with newspaper or printing offices in thirteen towns.

First published on 1 August 1857 as a free single sheet newspaper under the name Mount Ararat Advertiser, the paper was distributed throughout the Mount Ararat gold diggings. A report at the time estimated the number of people on the diggings to be between 40,000 and 50,000.

Six months after the death of Nuthall, Banfield bought the newspaper business for £1012 10s when it was auctioned on 20 March 1861. Banfield died in 1899 and the newspaper remained in the family's control until sold to a new company controlled by the Ballarat Courier in early 1962. It was known as the Ararat and Pleasant Creek Advertiser from 1861 to 1885, then as Ararat Advertiser.

The paper was sold and merged in 2025 with the Ararat Advocate to form the Ararat Advocate-Ararat Advertiser.

== Digitisation ==
Some editions of the paper has been digitised as part of the Australian Newspapers Digitisation Program of the National Library of Australia. As of 8 March 2018, these were all editions published in the five years 1914–1918.
