= Quest Community Newspapers =

Newspaper company

- Industry: Media
- Founded: July 1985
- Headquarters: Brisbane, Australia
- Area served: South East Queensland
- Products: Newspapers
- Parent: News Corp Australia
- Website: questnews.com.au

Quest Community Newspapers is a newspaper company in Bowen Hills, Queensland, Australia. It is a subsidiary of News Corp Australia.

It publishes weekly tabloids and one bi-weekly, providing news coverage primarily for the greater Brisbane area. In total, there are 20 free suburban newspapers, one news magazine (City News) and one gloss lifestyle magazine based on the Sunshine Coast, The Weekender, distributed to households and businesses throughout South East Queensland.

== Mastheads ==
Collectively, Quest Community Newspapers cover an area stretching from Caboolture in the north to Logan in the south, providing coverage of key suburbs in Brisbane for more than 1,000,000 readers in print and online weekly.

The full list of titles are:

- Albert & Logan News, online-only since June 2020
- Bribie Weekly, ceased publication in June 2020
- Caboolture Herald (formerly Caboolture Shire Herald)
- City North News (May 5, 2005 – present)
- City South News
- North-West News, ceased publication in June 2020
- North Lakes Times, online-only since June 2020
- Northside Chronicle (also known as Bayside Star), ceased publication in June 2020
- Pine Rivers Press, online-only since June 2020
- Redcliffe & Bayside Herald, online-only since June 2020
- Redlands Community News, online-only since June 2020
- South-East Advertiser, ceased publication in June 2020
- Southern Star, ceased publication in June 2020
- South-West News, online-only since June 2020
- Springfield News, online-only since June 2020
- Westside News, online-only since June 2020
- Wynnum Herald, online-only since June 2020

All Quest titles feature regular sections such as Motoring, Sport, Street-Watch and Lifestyle as well as local news and issues.

The Quest Newspaper Group was formed in July 1985 through an amalgamation of established weekly free-distribution newspapers across Brisbane.

Along with many other regional Australian newspapers owned by News Corp Australia, the newspaper ceased print editions of a number of Quest Newspapers in June 2020 and made them online-only publications from 26 June 2020. Other Quest newspapers ceased publication entirely.
