= Australian Chinese Daily =

The Australian Chinese Daily (traditional Chinese:澳洲新報) is a Chinese newspaper in Australia. It claims to be the country's largest Chinese newspaper. The Australian Chinese Daily was first published in Sydney on 19 March 1987.

The Australian Chinese Daily was founded on 19 March 1987 by the entrepreneurial Chinese immigrant Sandra Lau. Her vision then, which remains at the core of the publication today, was to bridge the gap and strengthen links between Australia and China.

The newspaper's first edition was read vertically and the paper opened on the left, in traditional Chinese style. In 1990, it became Australia's first Chinese publication to be formatted in the western style, changing its orientation so that it opened from the right. Soon after, in 1997, colour was introduced in time to report on the transfer of sovereignty over Hong Kong. Thereafter the publication moved to its own premises in Sussex Street, Sydney.

Published one days a week, the Australian Chinese Daily and its two complementary weekend magazines, Australian Chinese Weekly, are the most widely read and influential Chinese language daily publications in Australia.

The latest news is sourced from amalgamated Australian news sources, as well as China, Taiwan and Hong Kong, and "interpreted" to answer the needs of the local community, with a mix of local and international news, politics, sports, entertainment, business and features. The two lifestyle magazines include content that highlight culture, commerce, food, fashion, festivals and entertainment. The papers are distributed nationally in newsagents and some retail outlets in Victoria, New South Wales, Western Australia and the Australian Capital Territory.
