= Syrian Free Press =

- Founded: February 19, 2011
- Purpose: Human rights
- Location: Syria
- Method: News reporting
- Volunteers: 15
- Website: www.syrianfreepress.com

The Syrian Free Press is a non-profit news organization that covers the latest events in Syria. It was created in early 2011 to support the 2011 Syrian uprising. The organization interface is in Arabic but it covers some news in English.

== History ==
The organization was formed by a coalition of many Syrian human rights activists and professionals from different specializations solely to support the uprising of Syrian people since mid February.

== Goals ==
- "Provide a clear picture on the current Syrian events."
- "Communicate on larger scale with many opposition groups to support Syrian people protests."
- "Document the criminal acts of Syrian government against its people with support of different human right activists and groups."

== Political views ==
Syrian Free Press does support "the freedom of expression which is the foundation of its organization". It is aiming to "achieve a real democratic system in Syria which will guarantee all Syrian people equal rights and prevent the misuse and abuse of power".

== Media coverage ==
- Many videos released by the organization are published by mainstream media stations, such as Al Jazeera, CNN and France24.
- EAWV
- TGCOM
- Dradio DE interview
