= The North Central Review Pty Ltd =

Newspaper company in Kilmore, Victoria, Australia

The North Central Review Pty Ltd (NCR) is a newspaper publishing company based in Kilmore, Australia. The company was started in 2004 after the merger of The North Central Review and The Kilmore Free Press newspapers.

== Newspapers ==
The NCR's newspaper history dates back to 1870 with the launch of The Kilmore Free Press. The company publishes the weekly tabloids The North Central Review, which was created in 2004, The Free Press which merged with NCR in 2004, and The Whittlesea Review which was created in 2006. Both The Free Press and The Whittlesea Review incorporate content from The North Central Review.

The NCR also publishes the Country Lifestyle Guide and the North Central Wedding Guide.
