= Wheatbelt newspapers =

Newspapers published in the Wheatbelt region of Western Australia

This is a list of newspapers published in, or for, the Wheatbelt region of Western Australia.

The Wheatbelt region, situated close to Perth, is home to a number of popular tourist destinations. Its primary industry is agriculture, and the region has a rich agricultural history. Recently, however, there has been an increase in mining and mineral processing.

== Titles ==
Title	Years of publication	Status
Advocate Community	2010–present	Current
The Avon Argus and Cunderdin-Meckering-Tammin Mail	1925 - 1958	Defunct
Avon Echo	1959? - ?	Defunct
The Avon Echo: York's community newspaper	1990 - 1997	Defunct
The Avon Gazette and Kellerberrin News	1914 - 1916	Defunct
The Avon Gazette and York Times	1916 - 1930	Defunct
Avon News Pictorial	1966	Defunct
Avon News Express	1964 - 1965	Defunct
The Avon Valley Advocate	1985–present	Current
Avon Valley Gazette	2009–present	Current
Avon Valley News	1961 - 1962	Defunct
Avon Valley News Express	1962 - 1964	Defunct
Avon Valley News-Express Sporting Magazine	1963 - 1964	Defunct
The Ballidu-Wongan Budget	1927 - 1941	Defunct
The Beverley Times	1905 - 1977	Defunct
Beverley-York Express	1979 - 1986	Defunct
The Bonnie Rock-Lake Brown-Mukinbudin Leader	1934 - 1939	Defunct
The Bruce Rock Post and Corrigin and Narembeen Guardian	1924 - 1948	Defunct
The Bruce Rock Post and Corrigin Guardian	1917 - 1924	Defunct
The Bruce Rock-Corrigin Post, Narembeen-Kondinin Guardian	1948 - 1958	Defunct
Bruce Rock-Narembeen-Corrigin Post	1964 - 1977	Defunct
Central Districts Advertiser and Agriculture and Mining Journal	1893 - 1895	Defunct
The Central Districts Advocate	1922 - 1924	Defunct
Central Districts Gazette	1986 - 1995	Defunct
Central Districts Herald	1954 - 1958	Defunct
Central Districts Herald-Tribune	1958 - 1980	Defunct
Central Midlands & Coastal Advocate	1996–present	Current
Central Midlands Advocate	1995 - 1996	Defunct
Central News-Express	1965	Defunct
Chittering Times	1995 - 2011	Defunct
Coastal Central Districts Gazette	1994 - 1995	Defunct
Coastline	2002 - 2003?	Defunct
The Corrigin Broadcaster and People's Weekly	1930 - 1933	Defunct
Corrigin Chronicle and Kunjin-Bullaring Representative	1924 - 1943	Defunct
Corrigin News	1977 - 1985	Defunct
The Corrigin Sun	1929 - 1930?	Defunct
Dampier Herald and Bencubbin Chronicle	1937 - 1943	Defunct
Dampier Herald and Nungarin Standard	1943 - 1958	Defunct
Dampier Herald	1928 - 1937	Defunct
Dowerin Guardian		Defunct
The Dowerin Guardian and Amery Line Advocate	1927 - 1958	Defunct
Dumbleyung-Lake Grace-Newdegate Cultivator, Kukerin and Moulyinning Producer	1930	Defunct
The Eastern Districts Chronicle	1877 - 1927	Defunct
The Eastern News Express	1964 - 1965	Defunct
Eastern Recorder and Avon Argus	1958 - 1971	Defunct
Eastern Recorder	1909 - 1958	Defunct
The Farmers' Observer	1933 - 1935	Defunct
Goomalling Gazette	1946 - 1954	Defunct
Goomalling-Dowerin Mail	1910 - 1922	Defunct
Great Southern Leader	1907 - 1934	Defunct
The Irwin Index - (and North Midlands Gazette) (and Victoria District Gazette)	1926 - 1967	Defunct
The Kondinin Wheatlander and Kulin and Karlgarin Gazette	1926 - 1927	Defunct
Kondinin-Kulin Kourier and Karlgarin Advocate	1926 - 1941	Defunct
Koorda Record	1934 - 1939	Defunct
Kulin Advocate and Dudunun-Jitarning Harrismith Recorder	1934 - 1940	Defunct
The Lake Grace and Districts Leader	1933 - 1934	Defunct
The Lake Grace Newdegate Cultivator and Dumbleyung and Kukerin Producer	1925 - 1930	Defunct
The Merredin Advertiser	1978 - 1980	Defunct
The Merredin Mercury and Bruce Rock-Corrigin Post	1958 - 1964	Defunct
The Merredin Mercury and Central District Index	1922 - 1958	Defunct
Merredin Mercury	1964 - 1977	Defunct
The Merredin Mercury	1912 - 1921	Defunct
Merredin News Gazette	1962 - 1963	Defunct
Merredin Telegraph	1984 - 1986	Defunct
Merredin Wheatbelt Mercury	1987–present	Current
The Midlands Advertiser	1907 - 1930	Defunct
Midlands Advocate and Times	1957 - ?	Defunct
The Midlands Advocate	1930 - 1980	Defunct
Midlands and Central Districts Herald	1980 - 1983	Defunct
Midlands and Central Districts Tribune	?	Defunct
Midlands Telegraph	1983 - 1986	Defunct
Midlands Telegraph	1988	Defunct
Moora & Central Districts Gazette	1994 - 1995	Defunct
Moora Advocate	1993 - 1994	Defunct
The Moora Herald and Midland Districts Advocate	1914 - 1930	Defunct
The Narembeen Observer	1928 - 1933	Defunct
Narrogin Advocate and Southern Districts Courier	1904 - 1906	Defunct
Narrogin Observer	1991–present	Current
The Narrogin Observer	1930 - 1983	Defunct
The Narrogin Observer and Williams District Representative	1905 - 1930	Defunct
The New Mercury	1977 - 1980	Defunct
The Newcastle Herald and Toodyay District Chronicle	1902 - 1912	Defunct
News Express	1965 - 1966	Defunct
North Eastern Courier	1923 - 1958	Defunct
The Northam Advertiser News	1956 - 1959	Defunct
Northam Advertiser	1895 - 1956	Defunct
Northam Advertiser	1959 - 1986	Defunct
The Northam Advertiser	1987 - 1988	Defunct
Northam Advertiser and Toodyay Times	1954	Defunct
Northam Courier	1909 - 1922	Defunct
The Northam Independent	1996 - 1998	Defunct
Northam News	1947 - 1956	Defunct
Northam-Midlands Telegraph	1986 - 1988	Defunct
North-Eastern Courier	1923 - 1958	Defunct
The North-Eastern Wheatbelt Tribune	1926 - 1940	Defunct
Northern Valleys News	2011? - present	Current
The Nungarin Standard	1934 - 1939	Defunct
Nungarin-Trayning Mail and Kununoppin Advertiser	1917 - 1922	Defunct
The Observer	1984 - 1991	Defunct
The Phoenix	2016 - Current	Current
The Pingelly Express	1905 - 1906	Defunct
The Pingelly Leader	1906 - 1925	Defunct
The Pingelly-Brookton Express	1980 - 1981	Defunct
Pingelly-Brookton Leader	1925 - 1979	Defunct
Pinnacle Express	2003–present	Current
Pinnacle Papers	1980 - 2002	Defunct
Regional Observer	1983	Defunct
The Southern Argus and Wagin-Arthur Express	1905 - 1924	Defunct
The Southern Cross Herald	1894 - 1896	Defunct
The Southern Cross Miner	1899 - 1902	Defunct
The Southern Cross News	1935 - 1957	Defunct
The Southern Cross Times and Hollow's Find Miner	1927 - 1932	Defunct
The Southern Cross Times and Palmer's Find Miner	1935 - 1937	Defunct
The Southern Cross Times	1900 - 1921	Defunct
The Southern Cross Times	1923 - 1927	Defunct
The Southern Cross Times	1932 - 1935	Defunct
Southern Cross Times	1937 - 1940	Defunct
The Toodyay Herald	1984–present	Current
Toodyay Herald	1912 - 1954	Defunct
The Wagin Argus and Arthur, Dumbleyung, Lake Grace Express	1924 - 2015	Defunct
Wandering Star	1974	Defunct
The Weekly Gazette	1924 - 1946	Defunct
The West Coast Advocate	1995 - 1996	Defunct
The Westonian	1915 - 1920	Defunct
The Wheatbelt Mercury	1980 - 1987	Defunct
The Wheatbelt Tribune and Koorda Record	1940 - 1958	Defunct
The Wheatbelt Wheatsheaf and Dampier Advocate	1930 - 1939	Defunct
Wickepin Argus	1910 - 1934	Defunct
The Wongan-Ballidu Budget	1941 - 1954	Defunct
The Wyalkatchem Wheatsheaf and Bencubbin Banner	1922 - 1930	Defunct
The Yilgarn Merredin Times	1921 - 1923	Defunct
The York and Districts Community Matters	1998? - present	Current
The York Advocate	1915	Defunct
The York Chronicle	1927 - 1959	Defunct
The York Chronicle	2000 - 2002	Defunct
The York Gazette and Quairading and Dangin Herald	1930 - 1931	Defunct
The York Leader and Quairading and Dangin Herald	1935 - 1947	Defunct

== See also ==
- List of newspapers in Western Australia
- Gascoyne newspapers
- Goldfields-Esperance newspapers
- Great Southern newspapers
- Kimberley newspapers
- Mid West newspapers
- Pilbara newspapers
- South West newspapers
