= Mid West newspapers =

Newspapers published in the Mid West region of Western Australia

Newspapers published in, or for the Mid West region of Western Australia have included over 30 different titles over time.

The Mid West region covers 472,336 square kilometres and accounts for 8.7% of the Western Australian population. There has been some crossover between Mid West newspapers and the newspapers of the Pilbara and Gascoyne regions.

== Titles ==
Title	Years of publication	Status
The Black Range Courier and Sandstone Observer	1907–1915	Defunct
The Carnamah-Three Springs Times and Arrino Advertiser	1932–1933	Defunct
Coastline	2003–2006?	Defunct
Cue-Big Bell Chronicle and Reedy Recorder	1937–1942	Defunct
The Daily Advertiser	1890–1893	Defunct
The Daily Telegraph and North Murchison and Pilbarra Gazette	1920–1947	Defunct
The Daily Telegraph and North Murchison Gazette	1918–1920	Defunct
Day Dawn Chronicle	1902–1909	Defunct
The Dongara-Denison Rag	1981–present	Current
East Murchison Chronicle	????–1898	Defunct
East Murchison News	1900–1911	Defunct
The Geraldton Advertiser	1893–1905	Defunct
The Geraldton Express and Murchison and Yalgo Goldfields Chronicler	1896–1905	Defunct
The Geraldton Express and Murchison Goldfields News	1894–1896	Defunct
The Geraldton Express	1906–1928	Defunct
Geraldton Greenough Sun	1957–1973	Defunct
Geraldton Guardian and Express	1929–1947	Defunct
The Geraldton Guardian	1948–present	Current
The Geraldton Guardian	1906–1928	Defunct
Geraldton Murchison Telegraph	1892–1899	Defunct
Geraldton Observer	1880–1881	Defunct
Geraldton Sun: the weekly family newspaper	1956–1957	Defunct
Geraldton Telegraph	1984–1986	Defunct
Greenough Sun	1947–1957	Defunct
The Irwin Index and North Midlands Gazette	1932–1936	Defunct
The Irwin Index and Victoria Districts Gazette	1936–1956	Defunct
The Irwin Index	1926–1932	Defunct
The Irwin Index	1956–1967	Defunct
Magnet Mirror and Murchison Reflector	1928–1935	Defunct
Meekatharra Miner	1909–1918	Defunct
Midwest Mail	2003–2005	Defunct
Midwest Times	1992–present	Current
Morning Post	1895–1896	Defunct
The Mount Magnet Leader and Youanmi Miner	1935–1947	Defunct
Mount Magnet Mercury	1897	Defunct
Mount Magnet Miner	????–1947?	Defunct
Mount Magnet Miner and Lennonville Leader	1896–1926	Defunct
Mullewa Magnet and Perenjori-Morawa Advertiser	1927–1928	Defunct
Mullewa Magnet and Yalgoo-Mount Magnet Post	1928–1931	Defunct
The Mullewa Mail	1921–1947	Defunct
Murchison Advocate	1898–1912	Defunct
The Murchison Magnet	1935	Defunct
The Murchison Magnet and Mullewa Mercury	1926–1927	Defunct
The Murchison Times and Cue-Big Bell-Reedy Advocate	1937–1942	Defunct
The Murchison Times and Day Dawn Gazette	1894–1925	Defunct
The Murchison Times	1925–1937	Defunct
News of the North	1968–1987	Defunct
The North Midland Times	1933–1957	Defunct
North West Telegraph	1983–present	Current
Northampton Farmer	1913	Defunct
The Northern Mining Register and Murchison Goldfields Gazette	1896–1897	Defunct
The Northern Producer and Morawa and District Advertiser	1930–1947	Defunct
The Northern Producer and Morawa and Perenjori Advertiser	1928–1930	Defunct
Northern Times	1905–1983	Defunct
The Perenjori Pioneer	1930–1947	Defunct
Six Shires News	1964	Defunct
The Victorian Express: a journal of politics and news	1878–1894	Defunct
The Wiluna Chronicle and East Murchison Advocate	1924–1931	Defunct
The Wiluna Miner	1931–1947	Defunct
The Yalgoo Observer and Murchison Chronicle	1923–1941	Defunct
Yamaji news	1995–2012	Defunct

== See also ==
- List of newspapers in Western Australia
- Gascoyne newspapers
- Goldfields-Esperance newspapers
- Great Southern newspapers
- Kimberley newspapers
- Pilbara newspapers
- South West newspapers
- Wheatbelt newspapers
