= South West newspapers =

Newspapers of the South West of Western Australia

This is a list of newspapers published in, or for, the South West region of Western Australia.

The South West is Western Australia's most popular regional tourist destination. The region also has a notable agriculture industry; crops such as grapes, apples and avocados, account for 60% of the regions agricultural commodities.

Just over half of the current newspapers distributed in the South West region are owned by Seven West Media.

== Titles ==
Title	Years of publication	Status
Augusta Margaret River Times	2007–present	Current
Augusta-Margaret River Mail	1986–present	Current
The Blackwood Chronicle and South-West Mining News	1904–1907	Defunct
Blackwood Times	1905–1971	Defunct
Blackwood-Warren Sentinel	1950–1959	Defunct
The Boyup Brook Bulletin	1930–1950	Defunct
Bridgetown Advocate	1938–1950	Defunct
The Bridgetown	2014–?	Defunct
Bunbury Contract	1936	Defunct
The Bunbury Herald and Blackwood Express	1919–1929	Defunct
Bunbury Herald	1997–present	Current
The Bunbury Herald	1892–1919	Defunct
Bunbury Mail	1990–present	Current
The Bunbury Monitor	1934	Defunct
The Bunbury Star	1935–1936	Defunct
The Bunbury Sun	1957–1962	Defunct
Bunbury Weekender	1994–1996	Defunct
Busselton Dunsborough Times	2007–present	Current
Busselton Herald	1978–1979	Defunct
Busselton Margaret River Advertiser	1979	Defunct
Busselton-Dunsborough Mail	1996–present	Current
Busselton-Margaret River Herald	1979–1980	Defunct
Busselton-Margaret Times	1964–2007	Defunct
The Capes Herald	2003–2007	Defunct
The Coalfields Star	1934	Defunct
The Collie Mail	1917–1918	Defunct
The Collie Mail	1952–present	Current
The Collie Mail and Cardiff, Lyall's Mill, Collie Burn, Shotts and Worsley Gazette	1913–1917	Defunct
The Collie Mail and Coalfields Miner	1918–1919	Defunct
The Collie Mail and W.A. Coalfields Miner	1919–1952	Defunct
The Collie Mail: the miners' and timber workers' advocate	1908–1912	Defunct
The Collie Miner	1900–1916	Defunct
The Collie Times	1935	Defunct
Collie Weekender	1994–1995	Defunct
Donnybrook-Balingup Mail	1995–1996	Defunct
Donnybrook-Balingup Mail	1982	Defunct
Donnybrook-Balingup News	1979–1987	Defunct
Donnybrook-Bridgetown mail	1996–present	Current
Donnybrook-Bridgetown mail	1993–1995	Defunct
Donnybrook-Bridgetown mail	1987–1993	Defunct
Eaton Australind Harvey Reporter	1999–2000	Defunct
The Greenbushes Advocate & Donnybrook & Bridgetown Advertiser	1899–1902	Defunct
Group Settlement Chronicle & Margaret-Augusta Mail	1923–1930	Defunct
Harvey Australind Reporter	1997–1999	Defunct
Harvey Chronicle	1915–1916	Defunct
Harvey Leschenault Reporter	2001–2007	Defunct
Harvey Mail	2013	Defunct
Harvey/Murray Times	1931–1965	Defunct
The Harvey Reporter	1980–1997	Defunct
The Harvey Reporter	2000–2001	Defunct
Harvey-Waroona Mail	1931–1956	Defunct
Harvey-Waroona Reporter	2007–present	Current
Harvey/Waroona Times	1965	Defunct
Leschenault Reporter	1990–1994	Defunct
Manjimup & Warren Times	1927–1971	Defunct
The Manjimup Mail and Jardee-Pemberton-Northcliffe Press	1927–1946	Defunct
Manjimup Mail	1946–1950	Defunct
Manjimup Mail	1957	Defunct
Manjimup-Bridgetown Times	1997–present	Current
Margaret District Times	1956–1957	Defunct
Margaret River News	1931–1941	Defunct
Margaret-Busselton Times	1957–1963	Defunct
Morning Star	1988	Defunct
The Nannup Review	1939–1941	Defunct
The Nelson Advocate	1926–1938	Defunct
Ocean Express	1986–1989	Defunct
The Pelican Post	2002–2012?	Defunct
The Pemberton Post	1937–1950	Defunct
The Preston Mail and District Advocate	1932–1960	Defunct
South West Real Estate	1997?	Defunct
The South Western Advertiser	1910–1958	Defunct
South Western Herald	1910–1914	Defunct
The South Western News	1903–1963	Defunct
South Western Times	1932–present	Current
South Western Times	1917–1929	Defunct
South Western Tribune	1930–1932	Defunct
Southern Advertiser	1888	Defunct
Southern Times	1888–1916	Defunct
Sweat	1994–1995	Defunct
Waroona Advertiser	2007–2008	Defunct
Waroona Reporter	1980–1985	Defunct
Warren-Blackwood Times	1971–1997	Defunct
Western Herald	1976–1979	Defunct

== See also ==
- List of newspapers in Western Australia
- Gascoyne newspapers
- Goldfields-Esperance newspapers
- Great Southern newspapers
- Kimberley newspapers
- Mid West newspapers
- Pilbara newspapers
- Wheatbelt newspapers
