= The Residency, Bunbury =

Historic property in Bunbury, Western Australia

The Residency
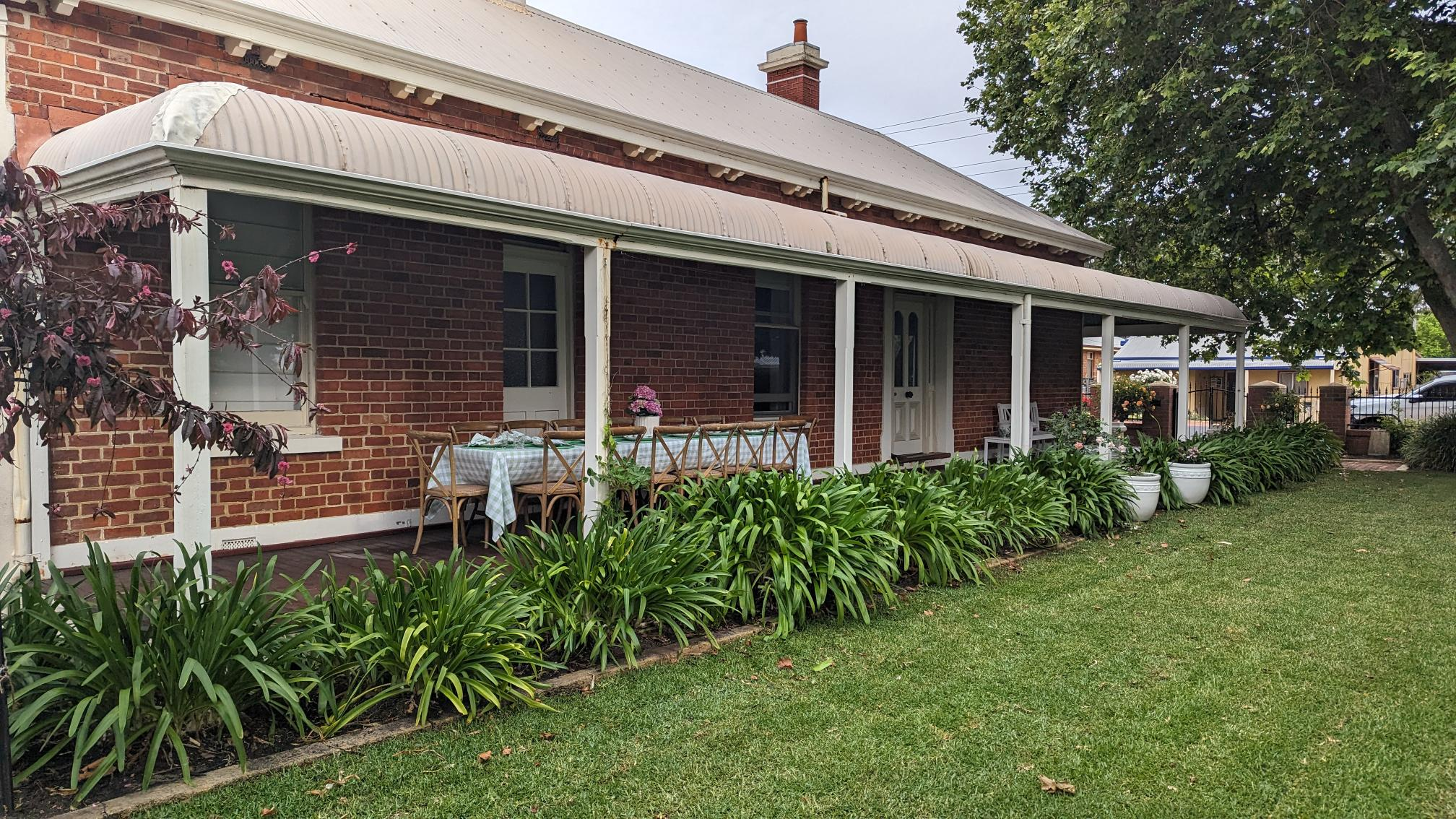
- Eastern side of The Residency, Bunbury in October 2023
- Interactive map of the The Residency area
- Former names: Treverton

General information
- Location: 55 Stirling Street, Bunbury, Western Australia, Australia
- Coordinates: 33.327447°S 115.643353°E

Western Australia Heritage Register
- Designated: 14 December 2001
- Reference no.: 355
- Completed: 1896

The Residency (formerly known as Treverton) is a historic private residence located in Bunbury, Western Australia. It was built during 1896 for William Henry Timperley, the Resident Magistrate of the Wellington Magisterial District. The building is a single storey brick and iron structure, with rendered details and bull nosed verandah and designed in the Victorian Regency style, a typically used Australian residential architectural style of the time.

== History ==
The residence was constructed on the site of a former blacksmith.

=== Residence for the Resident Magistrate ===
The Residency is believed to have been used as accommodation by successive Resident Magistrates up until the early 1930s.

==== William Henry Timperley (1896 to 1905) ====
The Residency was constructed during 1896 as a private residence for William Timperley, the Resident Magistrate of the Wellington District from 1890 to 1905. Timperley was granted title to the site of The Residency on 6 March 1896 and according to The Bunbury Herald of 19 June 1896, construction commenced in the first half of that year. At the time of construction, Stirling Street was known as White Road and the property was initially named Treverton. Timperley wrote a book in 1899 entitled Harry Treverton: A story of Colonial Life and the properties name Treverton likely derives from this association.

An extract from The Bunbury Herald in June 1986 provides some background to the significance of the property's construction at the time:

There has been a considerable addition to the number of our villa residences these last two years, many of the new buildings being of very handsome design. The Vasse road has, up to the present time, been the situation most generally favored, but lately the White road has been chosen for new villaresidences. Two of the latest are commodious and of pretty appearance. Mr. T. W. Paisley is having erected a very large private residence near Hastie's corner, facing thae school ground, and one of the finest private residences in Bunbury was completed lately for W. H. Timperley, Esq., R.M. It is both substantial and an ornament to the street and since its erection has added considerably to the value of frontages in the vicinity. Mr. Robert Balding is the architect, and the contractor, Mr. Joseph Hedley, has carried out his work most creditably. The building is built of brick, on a solid cement concrete foundation, with verandah on three sides, 7ft. wide, with ornamental post iron brackets and fence. The front of house is tuck pointed, with cement dressings round the window, the entrance is on the east side by a hall 20 x 6, with semi-circle and moulded cap and base. The dining room is on the right hand 14 x 15, has projecting double windows, under large arch. The drawing room 20 x 14 has windows similar to the dining room with cornish and ornamental centre flowers, the whole of the woodwork being grained mapel. On the right side are three bedrooms 14 x 11. on the left bedroom 14 x 15, smoking room 14 x 8 and servants room 14 a 8. Outside of the back door is open space 14 x 14. To the right is the kitchen; to the left bathroom and store. Mr. Harrington has also erected a fine private residence in the same line of street, and several other buildings will shortly be tendered for. The White Road is certainly be coming a favorite for residential sites, and bids fair to compete with the Vasse Road, where quite a number of villas have been erected. — "Local and General", The Bunbury Herald, 19 June 1896

Though, construction of the property for a public servant did stir controversy from some sections of the community as demonstrated by this article in Truth newspaper:

Though Bunbury can claim the proud distinction of being the birth-place of Big John Forrest, it is only a commonplace sort of town after all, and its inhabitants only commonplace ordinary human beings, who have their wants and their grievances, and like most mortals are not slow to air them, and further still, seldom get them gratified or redressed. Their latest grievance, however, is one which must be shared generally by the tax-paying electors of the State of Westralia as it particularly affects them in that very vulnerable spot—the pocket. Many, many years ago, Bunbury had a court-house erected, wherein the drunk could be fined, the "crook" corrected, and justice dispensed-ad lib. That court-house, like many other court-houses, has had its day, and is badly out of repair and out of date, and would now serve a more useful purpose if it were reconverted into a dust or rubbish bin in some back yard. Some months ago some of the village progressites, seized with the importance of their own Bunbury, moved Heaven and earth, in their endeavor to induce Government to erect them a more decent and commodious courthouse; one likely to more fittingly mark the progress of Banbury, but they were told in so many words that there was no loose cash available in the 'Government coffers'for court-houses, and that Banbury would have to continue to have justice dished up to them as of old in the old convict era ear-marked judicial temple. A sort of compromise was, however, effected. In order that the convenience and comfort of the magistrate should be better assured a ricketty affair was erected at the end of the dilapidated building, which went to answer the purpose of a magistrate's room. This compromise did not at all please the law and order-loving Bunburyites. They viewed the thing with disgust, and didn't at all attempt to hide their feelings, but the wash-house went up, and there, to all appearances, the matter ended. But something has since happened which indeed causes great concern to Bunburyites, and which should pave the way for some serious questions, being asked in the House. On the Estimates there is an item for £1,200 for a residence for the resident magistrate of Bunbury, Mr. W. H. Timperley. Now, Mr. Timperley is very comfortably quartered in his own house, and, judging by all appearances, he is well satisfied with himself in particular and the world in general. But whether the resident magistrate is well quartered or not is apart from the question. The comfort of the R. M. certainly is not, or should not, be above the convenience of the citizens. If money was not available for the erection of a much-needed court of justice, how comes it that £1,200 is available for the erection of a mansion which is not at all necessary? That a new court-house is eminently needed can be borne out by many members of Parliament. On the occasion of the last Parliamentary visit the court-house was inspected, and all, including the Colonial Secretary, were unanimous in the opinion that it had done ample service, and that a new court-house was urgently needed. It is the intention of the Premier to shortly visit the Bunbury show, and no doubt Bunburyites will not lose the opportunity of more folly placing the matter before him. We know that the R. M. is an old crony of Big John Forrest, and that might account for a lot of things. But the proposal to erect him a palatial residence, valued at £1,200 of public money, is past a joke. However, as public money is to be so heedlessly expended, while a dirty old garret of a court-house is to still remain a positive eyesore, "Truth" raises its voice in loud protest, and trusts that the Premier will hesitate before he consents to what will certainly be a scandalous waste of the State's funds. — "The Public Money", Truth, 31 October 1903

The Timperley's were frequently reported in local newspapers to hold social events at the property, including:

- An afternoon tea with Sir John Forrest (the premier of Western Australia at the time) and his wife Lady Forrest together with local residents in November 1899
- A celebration following the Siege of Ladysmith, described as "patriotic" in March 1900
- A "grand continental" by The Bunbury Orchestral Society in March 1902

The design of the building has been attributed to architect Robert Balding and construction by building contractor Joseph Hedley.

==== William Lambden Owen (1905 - 1920) ====
Timperley's retirement from the Resident Magistrate position was announced in December 1904 and he was granted a 6-month leave of absence on full pay from 1 January 1905. The Resident Magistrate position was relieved by William Lambden Owen during Timperley's leave, and Owen was subsequently appointed to the role permanently. In 1904, as William Timperley was preparing to leave the role of Resident Magistrate, the Public Works Department privately purchased the property at a cost of £1,500. This coincided with the appointment of William Lambden Owen to the position of Resident Magistrate in January 1905. Records indicate Owen resided at the property with his wife. Renovations were undertaken in 1913 by local contractor C. F. Coles.

==== George Tuthill Wood (1921 to 1923) ====
George Tutthill Wood became the Resident Magistrate of the Wellington District on 14 February 1921 and electoral roll records from 1921 confirm Wood and his family lived at the property.

==== Lionel Lamont Crockett (1923 to c. 1932) ====
Lionel Lamont Crockett became the Resident Magistrate of Bunbury on 26 January 1923 and remained at the property until c. 1932 when he moved to residential accommodation nearby.

=== Youth hostel (1990 - 2001) ===
The Bunbury Arts Council leased The Residency to the Youth Hostel Association for use as backpacker accommodation following an approach by the YHA in March 1989.

It is unclear exactly when the property began life as a hostel; what is known is that consent to sublease was provided in September 1989, development approval to undertake works to convert the property to a hostel was granted by the City of Bunbury in July 1990, and a formal lease signed in December 1990.

Accommodation for 35 beds was provided (other sources say approval was for 28 beds) and a freestanding ablution and laundry block was constructed at the rear/south of the main building.

The YHA lease expired on 1 July 2001 and the Association vacated in June of the same year.

== Heritage status ==
The property is an important part of the history of Bunbury and has been included in the City of Bunbury's Stirling Street Heritage Precinct (the name was changed in 2019 by the City of Bunbury to the East Bunbury Heritage Area).

The property was classified by the National Trust of Australia on 17 October 1980 and given entry on the Register of the National Estate Permanent on 21 October 1980 and the City of Bunbury's Municipal Inventory on 31 July 1996. It was listed on the State Register of Heritage Places on 14 December 2001.
