= Great Southern newspapers =

Newspapers published in Western Australia

This is a list of newspapers published in, or for, the Great Southern region of Western Australia.

== Titles ==
Titles	Years of publication	Status
Albany Advertiser, Australian Advertiser (1888-1897)	1888–present	Active
Albany Despatch	1919–1927	Defunct
The Albany Mail and King George's Sound Advertiser	1883–1889	Defunct
Denmark Post	1949–1964	Defunct
Gnowangerup Star and Tambellup-Ongerup Gazette	1915–1942	Defunct
Gnowangerup Star	1942–2003	Defunct
Gnowangerup Times	1912–1918	Defunct
Great Southern Herald (Katanning)	1901–present	Active
Mount Barker and Denmark Record (printed for the Albany Advertiser Ltd., York Street, Albany)	1929–1949	Defunct
Southern Districts Advocate (Katanning)	1913–1936	Defunct
Tambellup Times	1912–1924	Defunct
Denmark Bulletin		

== See also ==
- List of newspapers in Western Australia
- Pilbara newspapers
- Kimberley newspapers
- Gascoyne newspapers
- Mid West newspapers
- Goldfields-Esperance newspapers
- Wheatbelt newspapers
