= Kimberley newspapers =

Newspapers published in the Kimberley region of Western Australia

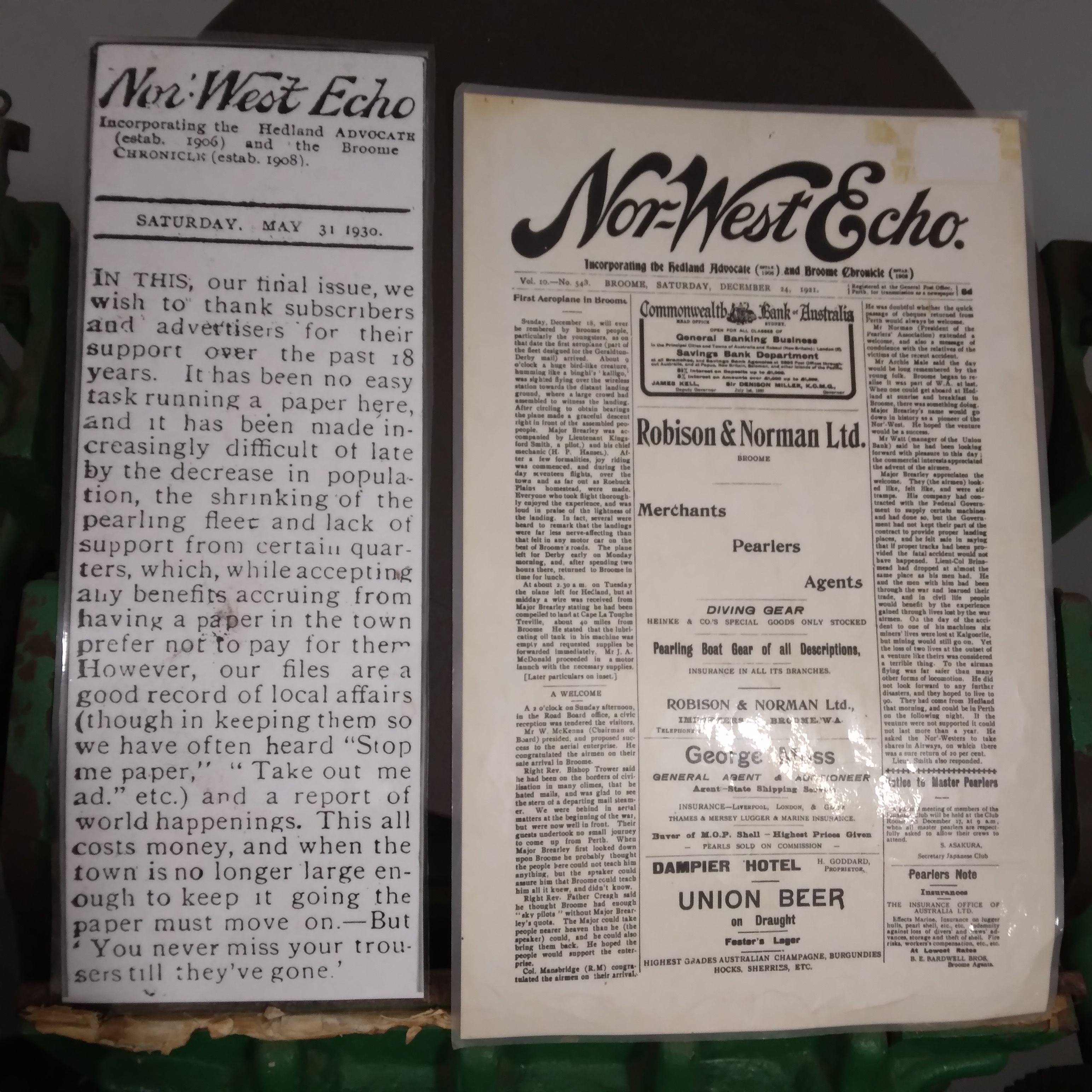
Items relating to the Nor-West Echo on display in the Broome Historical Museum

A modest number of newspapers have been produced in, or for, the Kimberley region of Western Australia. Few are still being published today. Some of the newspapers reflect the economic interests of the region, but not to the same extent that is seen in Pilbara newspapers. There is some cross-over between newspapers distributed in both the Kimberley and the Pilbara.

The Kimberley region has the second lowest population in Western Australia, accounting for approximately 6% of the state's population. However, from 2009 to 2013 the Kimberley experienced above average population growth at 2.7%. The low population numbers are reflected in the small number of Kimberley newspapers.

The Broome Historical Society Inc. have digitised and made available online editions of the community newspaper Broome News from 1977 to 1992.

== Titles ==

Title	Years of publication	Status
Broome Advertiser	18 June 1992–present	Current
Broome News	1977-1992	Defunct
Broome Chronicle and Nor'west Advertiser	1908 - 1912	Defunct
Dampier Despatch	1904 - 1905	Defunct
The Derby News	1887?	Defunct
The Kimberley Echo	1980–present	Current
Kimberley Times	1982 - 1983	Defunct
Kimberley Times	2004 - 2006	Defunct
North West Telegraph	1983–present	Current
Northern Times	1905 - 1983	Defunct
Nor-west Echo	1912 - 1930	Defunct
Nugget News	1986 - 1987	Defunct
The Ord River Bungle	1984 - 1986	Defunct
The Weekly News	1931 - 1934	Defunct
The Wyndham Gazette	1930	Defunct

== See also ==
- List of newspapers in Western Australia
- Gascoyne newspapers
- Goldfields-Esperance newspapers
- Great Southern newspapers
- Mid West newspapers
- South West newspapers
- Wheatbelt newspapers
