= Wickepin Argus =

Defunct newspaper in Western Australia, active 1910 - 1934

- Founded: 26 November 1910
- Ceased publication: 20 December 1934
- Language: English
- City: Wickepin, Western Australia
- Country: Australia
- ISSN: 2203-7268

The Wickepin Argus, also known as the Wickepin Argus and Eastern Districts Representative, was a newspaper published in Northam, Western Australia from 1910 until 1934.

== History ==
The first issue of the Wickepin Argus was published on 26 November 1910. At launch the proprietor was Edgar Sydney Hall of the Narrogin Observer.

Of the initial release, the Northam Courier remarked that the paper was "a creditable one, and bids fair to prove a promising addition to the ranks of our country journals". The Southern Argus said from the appearance of the publication they thought it would be a success. The Collie Miner also praised the first issue, saying it was "a creditable one suggesting the immediate probability of it fulfilling its avowed mission."

In January 1911, soon after its launch, there was some acrimony between the Wickepin Argus and the Great Southern Leader. It was alleged that the proprietor of the Argus had employed "despicable methods" to lure advertisers away from the Leader.

The paper's final edition was published on 20 December 1934.
