= 1905 Birthday Honours =

National awards given by King Edward VII

The 1905 Birthday Honours for the British Empire were announced on 30 June, to celebrate the birthday of Edward VII on 9 November.

The recipients of honours are displayed here as they were styled before their new honour, and arranged by honour, with classes (Knight, Knight Grand Cross, etc.) and then divisions (Military, Civil, etc.) as appropriate.

== Personal Aide de Camp ==
- Lieutenant His Royal Highness Prince Arthur F. P. A. of Connaught, K.G., G.C.V.O., 7th. (Queen's Own) Hussars.

== Aide de Camp ==
- Lieutenant-Colonel and Honorary Colonel Baptist Johnston Barton, commanding the 5th Battalion, The Royal Inniskilling Fusiliers.
- Lieutenant-Colonel and Honorary Colonel William Cooke-Collis, C.M.G., commanding the 9th Battalion, The King's Royal Rifle Corps.
- Lieutenant-Colonel and Honorary Colonel George O'Callaghan-Westropp, commanding the Clare Royal Garrison Artillery (Militia).

== The Most Honourable Order of the Bath ==
=== Knight Grand Cross of the Order of the Bath (GCB) ===
Military Division

- His Imperial Highness the Prince Arisugawa of Japan, G.C.B. (Civil) (Honorary)
- General Sir Edward Gascoigne Bulwer, K.C.B.
- General Sir James Macleod Bannatyne Fraser-Tytler, K.C.B., Indian Army.
- General Sir John Luther Vaughan, K.C.B., Indian Army.
- Lieutenant-General and Honorary General the Honourable Sir David Macdowall Fraser, K.C.B., Royal Artillery.
- General Sir Richard Thomas Farren, K.C.B.
- General Lord Alexander George Russell, K.C.B.

=== Knight Commander of the Order of the Bath (KCB) ===
Military Division

- Vice-Admiral Day Hort Bosanquet.
- Vice-Admiral Sir Charles Carter Drury, K.C.S.I.
- Vice-Admiral Harry Tremenheere Grenfell, C.M.G.
- Vice-Admiral George Lambart Atkinson-Willes.
- Rear-Admiral the Honourable Assheton Gore Curzon-Howe, C.V.O., C.B., C.M.G.
- Lieutenant-General and Honorary General Sir Edward Stanton, K.C.M.G., C.B., Royal Engineers.
- General the Honourable Robert Rollo, C.B.
- Lieutenant-General and Honorary General Horace William Montagu, C.B., Royal Engineers.
- Major-General and Honorary Lieutenant-General George Bryan Milman, C.B.
- Surgeon-General Charles McDonogh Cuffe, C.B.
- Major-General and Honorary Lieutenant-General George Samuel Young, C.B.
- Lieutenant-General Alexander George Ross, C.B., Indian Army.
- Lieutenant-General Charles Richard Pennington, C.B., Indian Army.
- General Sir Henry Perceval de Bathe, Bart.

Civil Division

- Philip Watts, Esq., F.R.S., Director of Naval Construction.
- Sir Guy Douglas Arthur Fleetwood Wilson, C.B., Assistant Under Secretary of State and Director of Army Finance.
- Sir Clement Lloyd Hill, K.C.M.G., C.B.
- Reginald MacLeod, Esq., C.B.

=== Companion of the Order of the Bath (CB) ===
Military Division

Centenary of the Crimean War

- Major-General and Honorary Lieutenant-General John Wimburn Laurie, C.B. (Civil).
- Lieutenant-General Thomas Henry Pakenham.
- Lieutenant-General and Honorary General Henry Ralph Browne.
- Lieutenant-General Gaspard le Marchant Tupper, Royal Artillery.
- Major-General and Honorary Lieutenant-General the Honourable Somerset John Gough Calthorpe.
- Major-General George Tito Brice.
- Major-General and Honorary Lieutenant-General the Honourable Bernard Mathew Ward.
- Honorary Major-General George Harrington Hawes, retired pay.
- Honorary Major-General Henry Butler, retired pay.
- Honorary Major-General Sir Edward William Blackett, Bart., retired pay.

Other

- Major-General John Stratford Collins, Inspector-General of Volunteers, India.
- Surgeon-General William Launcelotte Gubbins, M.V.O., Principal Medical Officer, Western Command, India.
- Major-General Ernest De Brath, C.I.E. Indian Army, Secretary, Military Department, Government of India.
- Colonel Richard Kirby Ridgeway, V.C., Indian Army.
- Colonel Albert Edward Ommanney, commanding (Welsh Border) Regimental District.
- Colonel Ernest Elliott Markwick, late Army Ordnance Department.
- Lieutenant-Colonel and Brevet Colonel Edward Bruce, Indian Army.
- Colonel George Barker, Inspector of Royal Engineers.
- Lieutenant-Colonel and Brevet Colonel Robert Alexander Wahab, C.I.E., half-pay, Royal Engineers.
- Lieutenant-Colonel and Brevet Colonel John Willoughby Astley Mai shall, half-pay.
- Lieutenant-Colonel and Brevet Colonel Harry Heptinstall Rose Heath, Indian Army.
- Colonel Edward Reginald Courtenay, Colonel, General Staff, Welsh and Midland Command.
- Colonel George Fitzherbert Browne, D.S.O.
- Colonel Henry Spencer Wheatley, Indian Army Brigade Commander, India.
- Lieutenant-Colonel and Brevet Colonel Thomas Charles Pleydell Calley, M.V.O., 1st Life Guards.
- Lieutenant-Colonel and Brevet Colonel William Pulteney Pulteney, D.S.O., Scots Guards.
- Lieutenant-Colonel and Brevet Colonel Richard Lloyd Payne, D.S.O., half-pay.
- Lieutenant-Colonel and Brevet Colonel Edward Cecil Bethune, half-pay.
- Lieutenant-Colonel and Brevet Colonel George William Deane, Indian Army.
- Lieutenant-Colonel and Brevet Colonel John William Hogge, C.I.E., Indian Army.
- Lieutenant-Colonel and Brevet Colonel Oswald Claude Radford, C.I.E., Indian Army.
- Colonel Frederick Spencer Robb, M.Y.O., half-pay.
- Colonel Henry Alfred Walsh, Chief Recruiting Staff Officer, London Recruiting District.
- Colonel Herbert Mullaly (late Royal Engineers), Deputy Quarter-Master-General in India.
- Colonel William Robert Robertson, D.S.O., Assistant Director of Military Operations, Headquarters.
- Lieutenant-Colonel and Brevet Colonel Duncan Campbell Carter, Royal Artillery.
- Lieutenant-Colonel and Brevet Colonel Granville George Algernon Egerton, Alexandra, Princess of Wales's Own (Yorkshire Regiment).
- Colonel Fred Smith, C.M.G., Army Veterinary Department, Principal Veterinary Officer, South Africa.
- Lieutenant-Colonel Neil Douglas Findlay, Royal Artillery.

Civil Division

- Honorary Commander Charles Edward Hely Chadwyck Healey, Royal Naval Reserve, K.C.
- Colonel James Stevenson, A.D.C., 9th Lanarkshire Volunteer Rifle Corps.
- Colonel the Most Honourable Charles Stewart, Marquis of Londonderry, K.G., G.C.V.O., A.D.C., 2nd Durham (Seaham) Eoyal Garrison Artillery (Volunteers).
- Lieutenant-Colonel and Honorary Colonel James Digby Legard, The Yorkshire (Duke of York's Own) Royal Garrison Artillery (Militia).
- Lieutenant-Colonel and Honorary Colonel the Right Honourable Robert George, Lord Windsor, Worcestershire Imperial Yeomanry.
- Lieutenant-Colonel and Honorary Colonel Frederic Natusch Maude, Hampshire Royal Engineers (Volunteers).
- Lieutenant-Colonel and Honorary Colonel William Coates, Royal Army Medical Corps (Volunteers), (Manchester Companies), Northern Command.
- Lieutenant-Colonel and Honorary Colonel Richard Pilkington, 2nd Volunteer Battalion, The Prince of Wales's Volunteers (South Lancashire Regiment).
- Henry Babington Smith, Esq., C.S.I.
- Lawrence Nunns Guillemard, Esq.
- William Russell, Esq.
- Colonel David Bruce, F.R.S.
- Hugh James O'Beirne, Esq.
- Gerald Henry Fitzmaurice, Esq., C.M.G.
- The Honourable William Napier Bruce.
- The Honourable Thomas Henry William Pelham.
- Hugh Lloyd Roberts, Esq.
- Major Edward Gilbert Clayton.
- The Reverend Edmond Warre, M.V.O., D.D.

== Order of Merit ==
- Field-Marshal Sir George Stewart White, G.C.B., G.C.S.I., G.C.M.G., G.C.I.E., G.C.V.O., V.C.
- Admiral Sir John Arbuthnot Fisher, G.C.B.
- Sir Richard Claverhouse Jebb, M.P.
- Sir Lawrence Alma-Tadema, R. A.
- George Meredith, Esq.
- William Holman-Hunt, Esq.

== Order of Saint Michael and Saint George ==
=== Knight Grand Cross of the Order of St Michael and St George (GCMG) ===
- Admiral Baron Hermann von Spaun, and Vice-Admiral Francois Ernest Founder, in recognition of their services on the International Commission of Inquiry into the North Sea Incident.

=== Knight Commander of the Order of St Michael and St George (KCMG) ===
- The Right Honourable Lord Plunket, K.C.V.O., Governor and Commander-in-Chief of the Colony of New Zealand.
- Everard Ferdinand im Thurn, Esq., C.B., C.M.G., Governor and Commander-in-Chief of the Colony of Fiji and His Majesty's High Commissioner for the Western Pacific.
- William Thomas Taylor, Esq., C.M.G., Resident-General for the Federated Malay States .
- John James Graham, Esq., C.M.G., Secretary to the Law Department of the Colony of the Cape of Good Hope.
- Rear-Admiral His Serene Highness Prince Louis Alexander of Battenberg, G.C.B., G.C.V.O., A.D.C.
- Colonel Charles Moore Watson, late R.E., C.B., C.M.G., for services in connection with the St. Louis Exhibition.
- Malcolm Mcllwraith, Esq., C.M.G., Judicial Adviser to His Highness the Khedive of Egypt.
- Apolo, Katikiro (Prime Minister) of Uganda. (Honorary)
- Monsieur Andre Eugene Henri Soulange Bodin, Minister in the French Diplomatic Service, for services in connection with the International Commission of Inquiry into the North Sea Incident. (Honorary)

=== Companion of the Order of St Michael and St George (CMG) ===
- Edward John Cameron, Esq., Administrator of the Island of Saint Vincent.
- Herbert Cecil Slolev, Esq., Resident Commissioner, Basutoland.
- George Vandeleur Fiddes, Esq., C.B., of the Colonial Office.
- George William Johnson, Esq., M.A., of the Colonial Office.
- Alan O'Brien George William Pendleton, Esq., Commissioner of Railways of the State of South Australia.
- Widenham Francis Widenham Fosbery, Esq., Senior Divisional Commissioner, Protectorate of Southern Nigeria.
- William Thomas Prout, Esq., M.B., Principal Medical Officer, Colony of Sierra Leone.
- John Eaglesome, Esq., Director of Public Works of the Protectorate of Northern Nigeria.
- James Wilson Robertson, Esq., LL.D., late Commissioner of Agriculture and Dairying of the Dominion of Canada.
- Henry Birchenough, Esq., for services as Special Commissioner to inquire into and report upon the position and future prospects of British Trade in South Africa.
- Captain John Percy Chirnside, of Werribee, in the State of Victoria.
- George Earle Welby, Esq., His Majesty's Minister Resident and Consul-General at Bogota.
- Lieutenant-Colonel and Brevet Colonel Robert Alexander Wahab, R.E., C.I.E., for services in connection with the delimitation of the Aden frontier.
- Herbert Edward White, Esq., M. A., His Majesty's Consul at Tangier.
- Willoughby Maycock, Esq., Superintendent of the Treaty Department of the Foreign Office.
- Major Arthur Lyndon Lynden-Bell, Deputy-Assistant Quartermaster-General. Department of the Chief of the General Staff of the Army.
- George Douglas Smith, Esq., Treasurer of the Uganda Protectorate.
- Roger Casement, Esq., late His Majesty's Consul in the Congo Free State.
- Eustace Corbet, Esq., Procureur-General to His Highness the Khedive of Egypt.
- Monsieur Louis Georges Robert Chodron de Courcel;
- Monsieur Francois Augustin Hubert Avril de Gregueil; and
- Monsieur Richard William Martin; for services in connection with the International Commission of Inquiry into the North Sea Incident. (Honorary)
- Cavaliere G. Pestalozza, of the Italian Consular Service. (Honorary)

== Royal Victorian Order ==
=== Knight Grand Cross of the Royal Victorian Order (GCVO) ===
- Reginald Baliol, Viscount Esher, K.C.B., K.C.V.O., Deputy Governor and Constable of Windsor Castle.
- Lieutenant-General Sir John Denton Pinkston French, K.C.B., K.C.M.G., commanding the Aldershot Army Corps.

=== Knight Commander of the Royal Victorian Order (KCVO) ===
- Sir Jacob Wilson, Honorary Director of the Royal Agricultural Society of England.

=== Commander of the Royal Victorian Order (CVO) ===
- Colonel the Honourable John Townshend St. Aubyn, commanding Grenadier Guards,
- Colonel Sir Henry Seymour Rawlinson, Bart., C.B., Commandant of the Staff College.
- Colonel Inigo Richmund Jones, C.B., commanding Scots Guards.
- Colonel Alfred Edward Codrington, C.B., commanding Coldstream Guards.
- Edward Richard Henry, Esq., C.S.I., Commissioner of the Metropolitan Police.
- Colonel Gerald Charles Kitson, C.M.G., Commandant of the Royal Military College, Sandhurst.

== Imperial Service Order ==
- Thomas Joshua Alldridge, Esq., late District Commissioner of the Sherbro District of the Colony of Sierra Leone.
- William Henry Bailey, Esq., Colonial Postmaster of the Island of Barbados.
- Thomas Robert Baillie-Gage, Esq., Solicitor to General Post Office, Dublin.
- Joseph Barling, Esq., a Commissioner oi the Public Service Board of the State of New South Wales.
- Claude Churchill Birch, Esq., Principal Clerk, Admiralty.
- Herbert Arthur Brook, Esq., Member of the Legislative Council and Registrar of records of the Bahama Islands.
- Hezekiah Africanus Caulcrick, Esq., Chief Clerk, Department of the Treasury of the Colony of Lagos.
- Leonard Creasy, Esq., M.Inst.C.E., Provincial Engineer of the Island of Ceylon.
- William James Downer, Esq., Principal Clerk, Office of Works.
- Laurence Fortescue, Esq., Chief Clerk, Office of the Comptroller, North West Mounted Police, Dominion of Canada.
- William Gray, Esq., Secretary, Post Office and Telegraph Department, Colony of New Zealand.
- Gerard Grenier, Esq., Registrar of the Supreme Court of the Island of Ceylon.
- James Barnes Heywood, Esq., Secretary to the Treasury, Receiver-General and Paymaster-General of the Colony of New Zealand.
- Walter Tatham Hughes, Esq., Assistant Secretary, Chelsea Hospital.
- M. S. Jackson, Esq., Senior Assistant Secretary for Stamps and Taxes, Inland Revenue.
- Lieutenant-Colonel Arthur Leonard Jarvis, Secretary, Department of Agriculture, Dominion of Canada.
- David Martin, Esq., Secretary, Public Works, Department of the State of Victoria.
- Joseph Samuel Martin, Esq., Inspector of Mines, Home Office.
- Peter Joseph McDermott, Esq., Under Secretary, Chief Secretary's Department, State of Queensland.
- Joseph Lazarus Minnow, Esq., Third Class Supervisor of Customs of the Gold Coast Colony.
- Robert William Span Mitchell, Esq., C.M.G., Government Emigration Agent in Calcutta for the Colony of British Guiana.
- Arthur Newbery, Esq., Clerk of the Executive Council of the Province of Prince Edward Island.
- John William Owsley, Esq., Official Trustee of Charitable Funds, Charity Commission.
- Sir Walter Peace, K.C.M.G., late Agent-General in London for the Colony of Natal.
- Arthur Charles Pedley, Esq., Acting Principal, War Office.
- J. Scott, Esq., Consul-General, Canton.
- Patrick Persse Seely, Esq., Manager of Pay Office, Edinburgh.
- Arathoon Seth, Esq., Registrar of the Supreme Court of the Colony of Hong Kong.
- Bernard Shaw, Esq., Police Magistrate and Commissioner of Requests, Hobart, State of Tasmania.
- William Strawbridge, Esq., Surveyor-General of the State of South Australia.
- G. E. Stronge, Esq., M.A., Senior Inspector of National Schools, Ireland.
- Henry Le Sueur, Esq., Collector of Customs and Registrar of Shipping, Capetown, Colony of the Cape of Good Hope.
- Napoleone Tagliaferro, Esq., late Director of Education of the Island of Malta.
- William Henry Timperley, Esq., Resident Magistrate, Bunbury, in the State of Western Australia.
- John Spencer Brydges Todd, Esq., C.M.G., late Secretary and Accountant to the Agent-General in London for the Colony of the Cape of Good Hope.
- Francis Spencer Wigley, Esq., Magistrate and Coroner (District C) of the Island of Saint Christopher.
- Miss Julia Mary Woodd, Principal Lady Clerk, Office of the Crown Agents for the Colonies.
