= Gascoyne newspapers =

Newspapers published in the Gascoyne region of Western Australia

Newspapers published or distributed in the Gascoyne region of Western Australia have been spread over a large distance, and in varying degrees of success. The region has a low population density, and some communities, apart from Carnarvon, would not be sufficient to support long term newspaper production.

In most cases, newspaper located in Perth and Geraldton would have summary news about the Gascoyne to supplement any local publications news. Pilbara newspapers have overlapped the Gascoyne region, but in most cases they are separate.

== Titles ==

| Title | Years of publication | Status |
|---|---|---|
| Gascoyne news | 2004 - ? | Defunct |
| Gascoyne telegraph | 1984 - 1988 | Defunct |
| News of the North | 1968 - 1987 | Defunct |
| The Northern guardian | 1985 - | Current |
| The Northern Times | 1905 - 1983 | Defunct |
| Shark Bay Herald | 1990 - 2006 | Defunct |
| Yamaji News | 1995 - 2012 | Defunct |

== See also ==
- List of newspapers in Western Australia
- Goldfields-Esperance newspapers
- Great Southern newspapers
- Kimberley newspapers
- Mid West newspapers
- South West newspapers
- Wheatbelt newspapers
