= William Timperley (magistrate) =

Policeman, civil servant and author (1833–1909)

William Timperley ISO
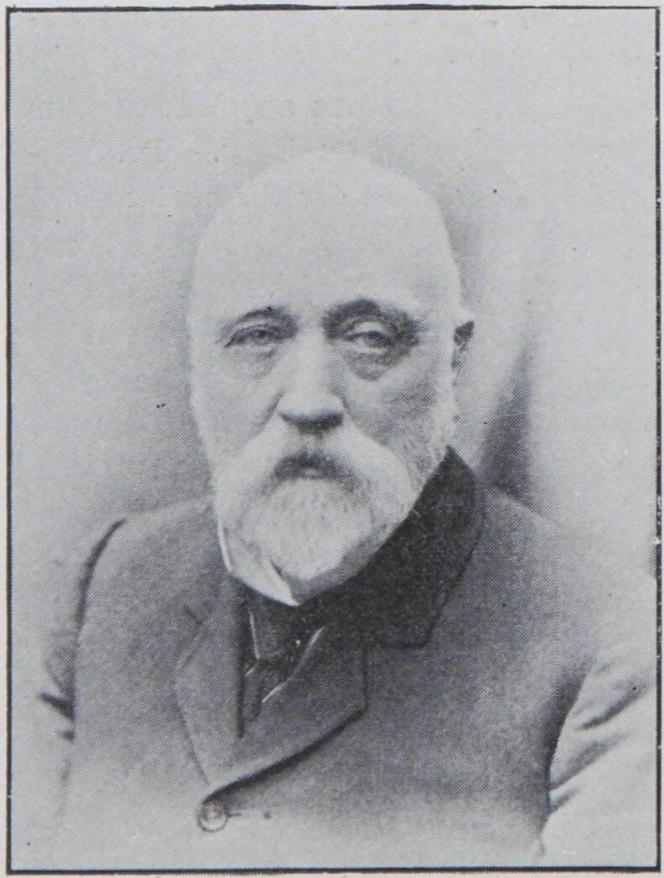

Commissioner of Western Australia Police (Acting)
- In office 24 April 1871 – 5 May 1871
- Preceded by: Gustavus Edward Cockburn Hare
- Succeeded by: Matthew Skinner Smith

Superintendent of Rottnest
- In office 7 August 1885 – 1890
- Preceded by: William Dockwray Jackson
- Succeeded by: Unknown

Resident Magistrate of the Wellington Magisterial District of Western Australia
- In office 1890–1905
- Preceded by: Unknown
- Succeeded by: William Lambden Owen

Resident Magistrate of the Blackwood Magisterial District of Western Australia
- In office 1903–1905
- Preceded by: Unknown
- Succeeded by: William Lambden Owen

Resident Magistrate of the Sussex Magisterial District of Western Australia
- In office 1903–1905
- Preceded by: Unknown
- Succeeded by: William Lambden Owen

Personal details
- Born: 22 May 1833 Solihull, Warwickshire, England
- Died: 11 August 1909 (aged 76) South Perth, Perth, Australia
- Resting place: Karrakatta Cemetery; 31.968912784940915°S 115.79805373150856°E
- Spouse: Rebecca Timperley (née Properjohn) (m. 1858)
- Relations: Harold John Timperley (grandson)
- Children: 10 (8 surviving until adulthood)
- Parents: Rev. William Thomas Postles Timperley (father); Elizabeth Bradney Timperley (née Evans) (mother)
- Education: Shrewsbury School
- Awards: Imperial Service Order

William Henry Timperley ISO (22 May 1833 - 11 August 1909) was an author, policeman and civil servant in Western Australia. He was the acting Commissioner of Western Australia Police briefly in 1871, Resident Magistrate of the Wellington Magisterial District from 1890 to 1905 and Resident Magistrate of the Blackwood and Sussex Magisterial Districts from 1903 to 1905.

== Early life ==
Timperley was born on 22 May 1833 at Solihull, Warwickshire, England, the eldest son of the Rev. William Thomas Postles Timperley and Elizabeth Bradney Timperley (née Evans). Timperley was educated at Shrewsbury School and in 1850 spent a year studying philosophy at the University of Berne, Switzerland before he immigrated to Australia in 1851 with his father and brother.

== Career ==
=== Western Australia Police Force ===
Timperley joined the Western Australia Police Force in January 1856, initially serving as a constable in Perth and Toodyay before rising to sergeant in 1857, around the time he transferred to Bunbury as Officer in Charge. In January 1860 he was promoted to sub-inspector and by December of that year the decision was made to transfer him to Fremantle, a role he commenced in January 1861. By April 1862 he moved to Champion Bay, continuing there as Officer in Charge until 1866, when he returned to Bunbury where he remained for a further three years before returning to Perth in April 1869. In 1870, while serving in Perth, Timperley was promoted to inspector and became second in command of the Force. He briefly became Acting Superintendent and Chief of Police from April to May 1871 before losing the contest for the permanent position to Matthew Skinner Smith.

In 1873 Timperley returned to Champion Bay in October 1873) remaining until he left the Police Force in August 1885 when he took up the posting of Superintendent of Rottnest Island.

=== Superintendent of Rottnest Island ===
Timperley served as Superintendent of Rottnest Island from 1885 until 1890.

=== Resident Magistrate ===
In October 1890, Timperley was appointed the Resident Magistrate of the Wellington Magisterial District of Western Australia. He was also made Resident Magistrate (acting) of the Blackwood and Sussex districts in July 1903.

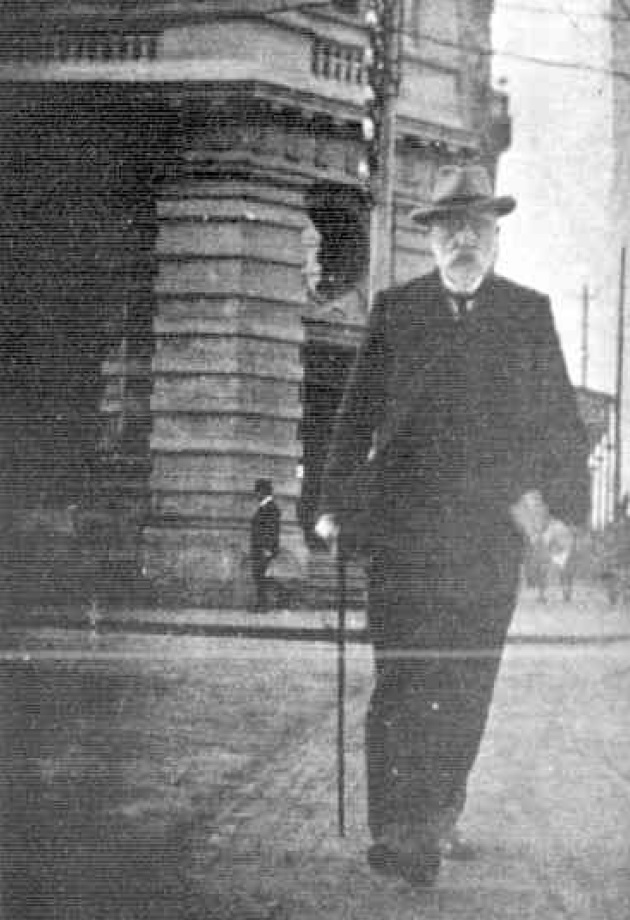
Timperley in Perth in 1907 after retirement

Timperley's retirement from the Resident Magistrate position was announced in December 1904. He was granted a six month leave of absence on full pay from 1 January 1905. The Resident Magistrate position was filled by William Lambden Owen during Timperley's leave, and Owen was subsequently appointed to the role permanently.

==== The Residency ====
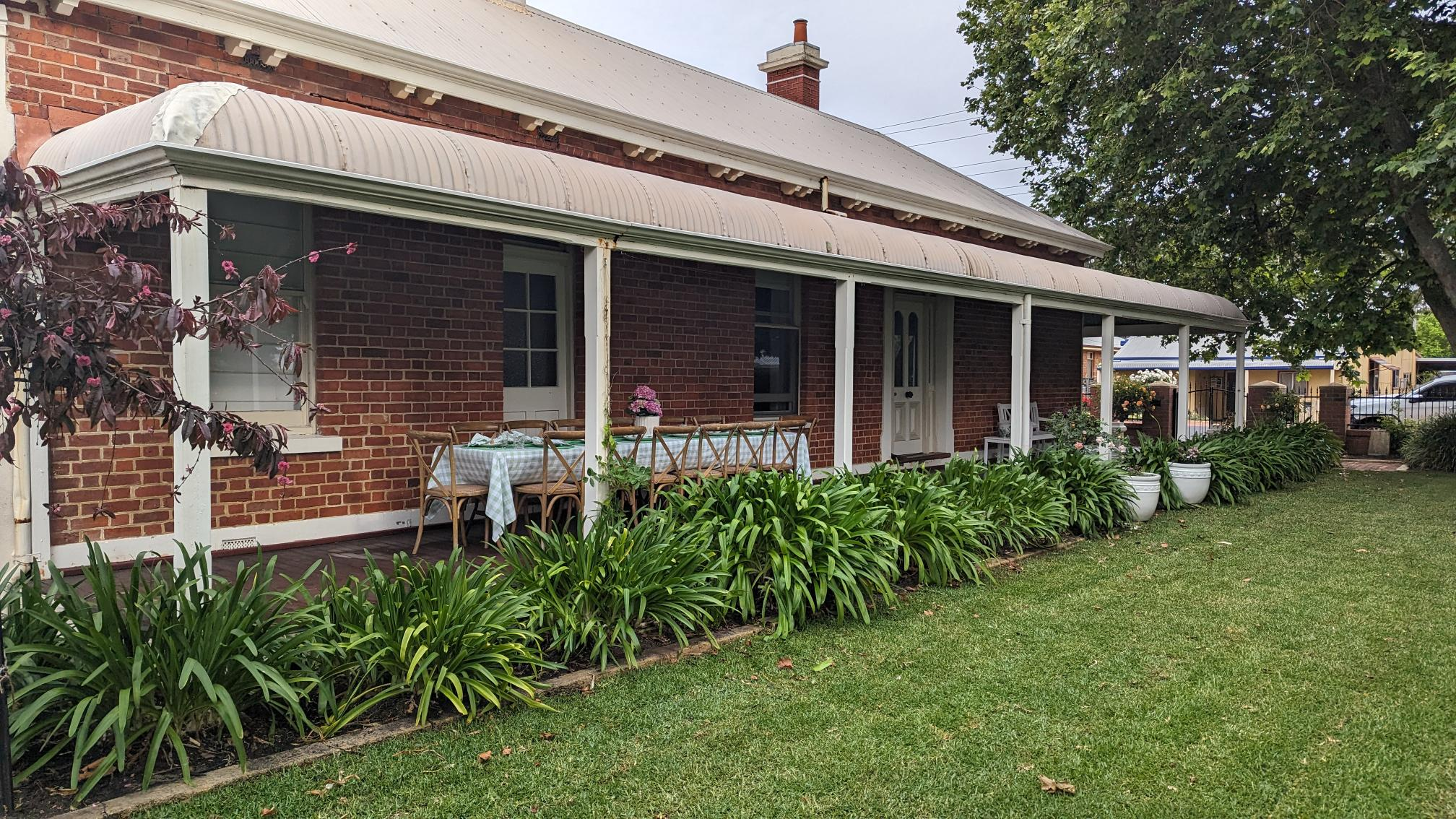
The Residency, east view

The Residency was constructed during 1896 at a cost of £1200 as a private residence for Timperley, who was granted title to the site of the home on 6 March 1896. According to The Bunbury Herald of 19 June 1896, construction commenced in the first half of that year. At the time of construction, Stirling Street was known as White Road and the property was initially named Treverton.

== Awards ==
Timperley was appointed a Companion of the Imperial Service Order (ISO) in the 1905 King's Birthday Honours "in consideration of his past services to the State".

== Family ==
Timperley married Rebecca Properjohn on 2 November 1858 in Bunbury, Western Australia. They had ten children, of whom two died in infancy. The eight surviving children were Maude Elizabeth Timperley (b. 1858), Hannah May Timperley (b. 1862), Frederick Henry Timperley (b. 1863) (father of journalist and author Harold John Timperley), Edith Ada Timperley (b. 1865), Oughton Percy Timperley (b. 1866), Alice Mary Timperley (b. 1868), Forrest Burges Timperley (b. 1877) and Lewis Clayton Timperley (b. 1879).

== Author ==
After meeting in 1883, Timperley was persuaded by Lady Mary Anne Broome (wife of the Governor of Western Australia, Sir Frederick Napier Broome and an author herself) to write Harry Treverton: His Tramps and Troubles: Told by Himself, virtually an autobiography which she edited. He subsequently wrote Bush Luck and both were serialised in The Boy's Own Paper between 1887 and 1890, and later were published in London (1889 and 1892 respectively) in book form. Timperley stated the reason for writing Harry Treverton was to

endeavour to let English people see what their sons might expect if they allowed them to come to the colonies with neither friends nor money. Unfortunately, this is too often the case. I know several gentlemen's sons at the present time who are struggling in the bush for a bare subsistence; and I need hardly say that the surroundings of bush life have anything but a high moral tendency. In 'Bush Luck' I have tried to show the other side of the picture, and to illustrate how a lad with friends to advise, and a certain amount of money to assist him, may by dint of patience and industry win his way to independence.

== Death ==
Timperley died at his residence in South Perth, Perth, Australia on 11 August 1909 following a stroke. He is buried at Karrakatta Cemetery.

== Bibliography ==
Publications by W.H. Timperley
Title	Date	Ref.
1. Harry Treverton: His Tramps and Troubles: Told by Himself	1889	
2. Bush Luck: An Australian Story	1892	
