= The Mount Magnet Leader and Youanmi Miner =

Newspaper in WA, Australia, active 1935 - 1947

- Founded: 25 January 1935
- Ceased publication: 31 January 1947
- Language: English
- City: Mount Magnet, Western Australia
- Country: Australia

The Mount Magnet Leader and Youanmi Miner, originally known as the Murchison Magnet from January to October 1935, was a newspaper published in the mining community of Mount Magnet, Western Australia from 1935 until 1947. Originally published by P.E. Hayter, from December 1937 it was under the ownership of the Telegraph Printing and Publishing Co. Ltd.

== See also ==
- Mid West newspapers
