= T. J. Alldridge =

British colonial administrator

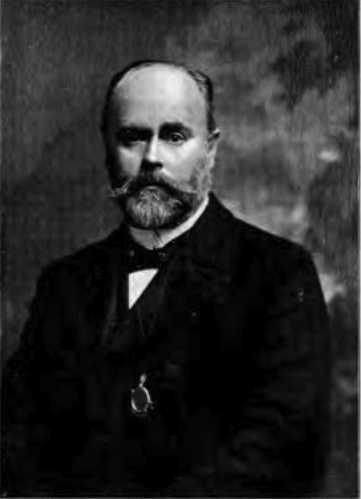
Alldridge in 1901, photo by John Thomson

Thomas Joshua Alldridge ISO (21 April 1847 – 28 June 1916) was a British colonial administrator who was the first district commissioner of Sierra Leone. He traveled extensively throughout the country and his photographs are among the first to be taken of the interior regions. In 1900, the Royal Geographical Society honored him for his contributions to ethnography. In the 1905 Birthday Honours, he was appointed a Companion of the Imperial Service Order.

Alldridge was born in Peckham, London, the son of Richard William Alldridge and Elizabeth Lincoln.
