= Arthur Pedley =

Arthur Charles Pedley CB ISO (July 1859–16 December 1943) was a senior British civil servant.

Pedley was born in 1859, the son of Matthew Pedley of Chatteris, Cambridgeshire, and Elizabeth Wayman (née Amory). He was educated at Bedford Modern School.

Pedley joined the Local Government Board for Ireland in Dublin in 1877. In 1879 he transferred to the War Office, where he was to spend the rest of his career. He was promoted to Acting Assistant Principal in the Pay Division in January 1900, Assistant Principal in 1902 and Principal in 1913. He retired in 1919.

He was appointed Companion of the Imperial Service Order (ISO) in the 1905 Birthday Honours and Companion of the Order of the Bath (CB) in the 1920 New Year War Honours.
