= List of newspapers in Goldfields–Esperance =

Newspapers published in the Goldfields–Esperance region of Western Australia

This is a list of newspapers published in, or for, the Goldfields–Esperance region of Western Australia.

Newspapers published in the goldfields, and the people involved, in the late 1890s and early 1900s during the expansive stage of the goldfields, were of considerable political impact on Western Australian politics. The seeking of adequate representation of goldfields interests over the coast in the Perth-based parliament was a constant issues over the early decades of the newspapers.

Goldfields–Esperance is the biggest region in Western Australia. Its population is just under 60,000. The regions involvement in the mining industry is reflected in a number of its newspapers.

== Titles ==
Title	Years of publication	Status	Notes	Ref.
Boulder Broadsheet	1991	Defunct		
The Boulder Miner	1899	Defunct		
The Broad Arrow Standard	1896–1899	Defunct		
Bullfinch Budget	1910–1911	Defunct		
Bullfinch Bulletin	1910	Defunct		
Bullfinch Miner and Yilgarn Advocate	1910–?	Defunct		
The Bulong Bulletin and Mining Register	1897–1898	Defunct		
Community Spirit	1990–present	Current		
Coolgardie Miner	1894–1911; 1913–1917; 1935–1957	Defunct		
Coolgardie Mining Review	1895–1897	Defunct		
Coolgardie Pioneer	1895–1901	Defunct		
The Coolgardie Review	1895	Defunct		
East Coolgardie Herald	1895	Defunct		
Esperance Advertiser	1965–1974	Defunct		
Esperance Chronicle and Dundas and Norseman Advertiser	1895–1898	Defunct		
The Esperance Echo	1929	Defunct		
The Esperance Express	1973–2020	Defunct		
Esperance News-Express	1965	Defunct		
The Esperance Times	1896–1898	Defunct		
The Eucla Recorder	1898–1900	Defunct		
Evening Courier	1902–1903	Defunct		
The Evening News	1921–1922	Defunct		
The Evening Star	1898–1921	Defunct		
The Express Regional News	1980–1981	Defunct		
The Golden Age	1894–1898	Defunct		
The Golden Mail: Kalgoorlie-Boulder	1997–2009	Defunct		
Goldfields Esperance Magazine	1997–1999	Defunct		
The Goldfields Express	1976–1980	Defunct		
Goldfields Express	2003?–2014?	Defunct		
The Goldfields Methodist	1897	Defunct		
The Goldfields Morning Chronicle	1896–1898	Defunct		
The Goldfields Observer	1930–1939	Defunct		
Goldfields Sporting Drama	1899	Defunct		
Goldfields Weekender	1981	Defunct		
Great Eastern News	1957–1958	Defunct		
The Hannans Herald	1895–1896	Defunct		
Herald	1899–1901	Defunct		
The Inland Watch	1937–1943	Defunct		
Kalgoorlie Advocate and Northern Goldfields News	1903	Defunct		
The Kalgoorlie and Boulder Standard	1897–1898	Defunct		
The Kalgoorlie Miner	1895–present	Current		
Kalgoorlie Pioneer & East Coolgardie Miner	1894	Defunct		
Kanowna Democrat	1898	Defunct		
Kanowna Democrat and North-East Coolgardie Advertiser	1896–1897	Defunct		
Kanowna Herald	1898	Defunct		
Kanowna News	1899	Defunct		
The Kookynie Advocate and Northern Goldfields News	1903–1904	Defunct		
Kookynie Press	1903–1911	Defunct		
Laverton Mercury	1899–1921	Defunct	Known as the Morgans and Laverton Mercury from 1903 until 1908, as the Laverton and Morgan's Mercury from 1909 until 1915, and as the Laverton and Beria Mercury from 1919 until 1921.	
The Leonora Miner	1910–1928	Defunct		
Leonora News: a journal for the northern pastoral and gold mining areas of W.A.	1944?–?	Defunct		
The Malcolm Chronicle and Leonora Advertiser	1897–1905	Defunct		
Menzies Daily News	1896–1898	Defunct		
The Menzies Miner	1895–1901	Defunct		
Menzies Weekly Times	1897–1898	Defunct		
The Miner	1896–1897	Defunct		
The Miners' Daily News	1896–1898	Defunct		
The Miners' Right	1897; 1904	Defunct		
The Mirror	1905–1910	Defunct		
Morgan's Courier	1904–1911	Defunct		
Mount Leonora Miner	1899–1910	Defunct		
The Mount Margaret Mercury	1896–1897	Defunct		
The Mount Morgan Courier	1904–1911	Defunct		
The Mount Morgan's Mercury	1904–1909	Defunct		
Mount Morgans Miner	1900–1903	Defunct		
News of the North	1968–1987	Defunct		
Niagara Miner	1895	Defunct		
Norseman Advertiser	1935–1936	Defunct		
The Norseman Esperance Guardian and Dundas Goldfields Advertiser	1896	Defunct		
The Norseman Pioneer	1896–1897	Defunct		
Norseman Sentinel and Princess Royal Watchdog	1903	Defunct		
The Norseman Times	1898–1920	Defunct		
The Norseman–Esperance News	1936–1957	Defunct		
The North Coolgardie Herald and Menzies Times	1896–1898	Defunct		
The North Coolgardie Herald and Miner's Daily News	1898–1904	Defunct		
The North Coolgardie Herald	1904–1911	Defunct		
The Northern Grazier and Miner: a journal for northern pastoral and gold mining areas of Western Australia	1929–1944	Defunct		
The Phillips River Times	1904–1911	Defunct		
The Recherche Gazette	1994	Defunct		
Sporting Life: Dryblower's journal	1905–1906	Defunct		
The Sun	1898–1929	Defunct		
The Sun	1939	Defunct		
Sunday Figaro	1904	Defunct		
The Tothersider	1897	Defunct		
The W.A. Sportsman	1901–1902	Defunct		
Western Argus	1894–1938	Defunct	Known as the Kalgoorlie Western Argus from 1895 until 1916	
The Western Australian Goldfields' Courier	1894–1898	Defunct		
The Westonian	1915–1920	Defunct		
Westralian Clarion	1903	Defunct		
Westralian Worker	1910–1951	Defunct	Founded in 1900 in Kalgoorlie. Moved operations to Perth in 1912.	

== See also ==
- List of newspapers in Western Australia
- Gascoyne newspapers
- Great Southern newspapers
- Kimberley newspapers
- Mid West newspapers
- Pilbara newspapers
- South West newspapers
- Wheatbelt newspapers
