= Pilbara newspapers =

Newspapers published in the Pilbara region of Western Australia

Pilbara newspapers is a selection of newspapers published in the Pilbara region of Western Australia.

The rise and fall of some of the newspapers reflect the shifts and changes in population in various localities of the region as mining starts and moves through different zones, and also as some mining operations are exhausted or closed.

== Titles ==
Title	Years of publication	Status
The Daily Telegraph and North Murchison and Pilbarra Gazette	1920 - 1947	Defunct
Daily Telegraph and North Murchison Gazette	1918 - 1920	Defunct
Hamersley News	1972 - 1980	Defunct
Hedland Advocate	1906 - 1912	Defunct
Hedland Times	1967 - 1978	Defunct
Iron Ore Chronicle	1989	Defunct
Karratha Guardian	1986 - 1994	Defunct
The Manganese Record, Peak Hill, Nullagine and Marble Bar Gazette	1928 - 1941	Defunct
Mt. Newman Chronicle	1972 - 1988	Defunct
Newman Mail	2007 - 2010	Defunct
Newslink	1988? - 1996	Defunct
North West News : a journal of Cliffs Robe River Iron Associates, incorporating the Wickham Observer and Pannawonica News	1985 - 1989	Defunct
North West Telegraph	1983 -	Current
Northern Public Opinion and Mining and Pastoral News	1894 - 1902	Defunct
The Nor'-West Times and Northern Advocate	1891 - 1894	Defunct
Pilbara Advertiser	1980 - 1983	Defunct
Pilbara Echo (Karratha/Dampier ed.)	2008 -	Current
Pilbara Echo (Hedland ed.)	2008 -	Current
Pilbara News	2002 -	Current
Pilbara Times	1978 - 1983	Defunct
The Pilbarra Goldfields News	1897 - 1923	Defunct
Roebourne Supplement to the Northern Times	1912	Defunct
What's on in Newman	1993 - 1994	Defunct

== Earlier newspapers ==
Pilbarra Goldfield News (note that the modern spelling is 'Pilbara'). Published from 19 February 1897 to 20 March 1923, first in Marble Bar and then, from 1912, in Port Hedland.

== Post 1960- ==
=== Pilbara Echo ===
Pilbara Echo.

Karratha & Port Hedland, W.A. : Pilbara Newspapers Pty Ltd.
Dates 28 Feb. 2008 – 10 Apr. 2014 on. Weekly on Saturday afternoon.
Distribution 14,000 copies free weekly: Port Hedland, South Hedland, Wedgefield, Karratha; Dampier; Wickham, Roebourne, Pt Samson, Onslow, Tom Price, Pannawonica, Paraburdoo. Shire of Roebourne, Shire of Ashburton & Town of Port Hedland.

=== North West Times ===
North West News : a journal of Cliffs Robe River Iron Associates,

- Dates – Issue 1 (June 1985) -Biweekly

Published by Robe River Iron Associates from Issue 22 (Apr. 18, 1986)-
Includes Wickham observer vol. 9, no. 21 (Jun. 14, 1985) and Pannawonica news.

=== Hedland Times ===
Hedland Times.

Dates – No. 1. 22 June 1967 – 2 Nov. 1978.

Distribution area: Goldsworthy; Marble Bar; Newman; Onslow; Port Hedland; Dampier; Mt Tom Price; Roebourne; Point Samson; Nullagine; Wittenoom; Barrow Island; South Hedland; Cooke Point; Finucane Island; Karratha; Shay Gap; Paraburdoo.

=== Pilbara Times ===
Pilbara Times. Also known as The New Pilbara Times

Perth, W.A. – Country Newspapers Pty Ltd.
Dates - 9 Nov. 1978 – vol. 14, no. 171 25 Aug. 1983. Weekly on Thursday.
Distribution: Port Hedland; Wickham; Marble Bar; Onslow; South Hedland; Goldsworthy; Dampier; Telfer; Cooke Point; Finucane Island; Karratha; Newman; Tom Price; Roeburne; Point Samson; Nullagine; Shay Gap; Paraburdoo; Wittenoom; Pannawonica.

=== Hamersley News ===
Hamersley News.

Perth, W.A. Hamersley Iron Pty Ltd.
Dates – Vol. 1, no. 1. 20 Mar. 1969 – Sep. 1972 – Monthly
Vol. 5, no. 1, 26 Oct. 1972 – v. 13, no. 6, 27 Mar. 1980 – Fortnightly.
Distribution: Dampier; Karratha; Tom Price; Paraburdoo.

followed by – Pilbara Advertiser.

=== Pilbara Advertiser ===
Pilbara Advertiser.

Karratha W.A. Pilbara Advertiser
Dates – 11 Apr. 1980-24 Aug. 1983. – Weekly on Wednesday.
Fortnightly to 23 May 1980;
Weekly on Friday from 30 May 1980 to 21 Nov. 1980;
Weekly on Thursday from 27 Nov. 1980 to 28 April 1983;
Weekly on Wednesday from 4 May 1983.
Distribution: Tom Price; Onslow; Newman; Goldsworthy; Karratha; Dampier; Paraburdoo; Wickham; Roeburne; Port Hedland; South Hedland; Nullagine; Wittenoom; Finucane Island; Marble Bar; Pannawonica; Shay Gap.

followed by – North West Telegraph

=== North West Telegraph ===
North West Telegraph.

Albany [W.A.] : Albany Advertiser
Dates – 31 Aug. 1983 – Weekly on Wednesday.
Published by Provincial Publications of WA, Rockingham, then by Albany Advertiser, Albany.
From 31 Aug. 1983-6 June 1984 issued in three editions: Gascoyne edition, Pilbara edition, Kimberley edition.

- combining of North west telegraph (Pilbara edition), ISSN 0813-961X; and, North west telegraph (Kimberley edition), ISSN 0814-0308.

also at: http://www.westregional.com.au/papers/nwt/index.html
Distribution: Port Hedland; Newman; Marble Bar; Onslow; Tom Price; Goldsworthy; Broome; Meekatharra; Nullagine; Paraburdoo.

Former title – see – The Northern Times – North West Telegraph (Pilbara edition) 0813-961X

=== Pilbara News ===
Pilbara News.

Karratha, W.A. : Pilbara News. ISSN 1447-0101
Distribution: Karratha; Dampier; Tom Price; Paraburdoo; Pannawonica; Wickham; Onslow; Gascoyne Junction; Roeburne.

=== News of the North ===
News of the North.

Perth W.A.: West Australia Newspapers
Dates 28 Aug. 1968-15 Jan. 1987. Weekly on Thursday
Supplement to the West Australian.
Weekly on Wednesday from 28 Aug. 1968-2 Mar. 1977;
Weekly on Tuesday from 8 Mar. 1977-8 April 1980;
Weekly on Thursday from 17 April 1980. – 15 Jan 1987.
Distribution: Kalbarri; Denham; Yalgoo; Mt Magnet; Cue; Meekatharra; Sandstone; Laverton; Wiluna; Carnarvon; Wittenoom; Nullagine; Marble Bar; Exmouth; Onslow; Dampier; Tom Price; Mt Newman; Roeburne; Port Hedland; Goldsworthy; Broome; Derby; Cockatoo Island; Koolan Island; Fitzroy Crossing; Hall's Creek; Kununurra; Wyndham.

== Source of dates and publication details ==
State Library of Western Australia website catalogue – https://web.archive.org/web/20180912182347/http://henrietta.liswa.wa.gov.au/

== See also ==
- List of newspapers in Western Australia
- Gascoyne newspapers
- Goldfields-Esperance newspapers
- Great Southern newspapers
- Kimberley newspapers
- Mid West newspapers
- South West newspapers
- Wheatbelt newspapers
