= Avon Advocate =

Newspaper in the Wheatbelt region of Western Australia

The Avon Valley and Wheatbelt Advocate (abbreviated to Avon Advocate or Avon Valley Advocate) is a newspaper published in Northam, Western Australia.

== History ==
In the 1980s Northam residents Steve Altham and Ray Adams established up the Advocate in opposition to the Northam Advertiser which they believed had lost its local focus after becoming part of the Sunday Times group. It was acquired by Rural Press in 1992, which later became part of Fairfax Media.
