= Hamersley News =

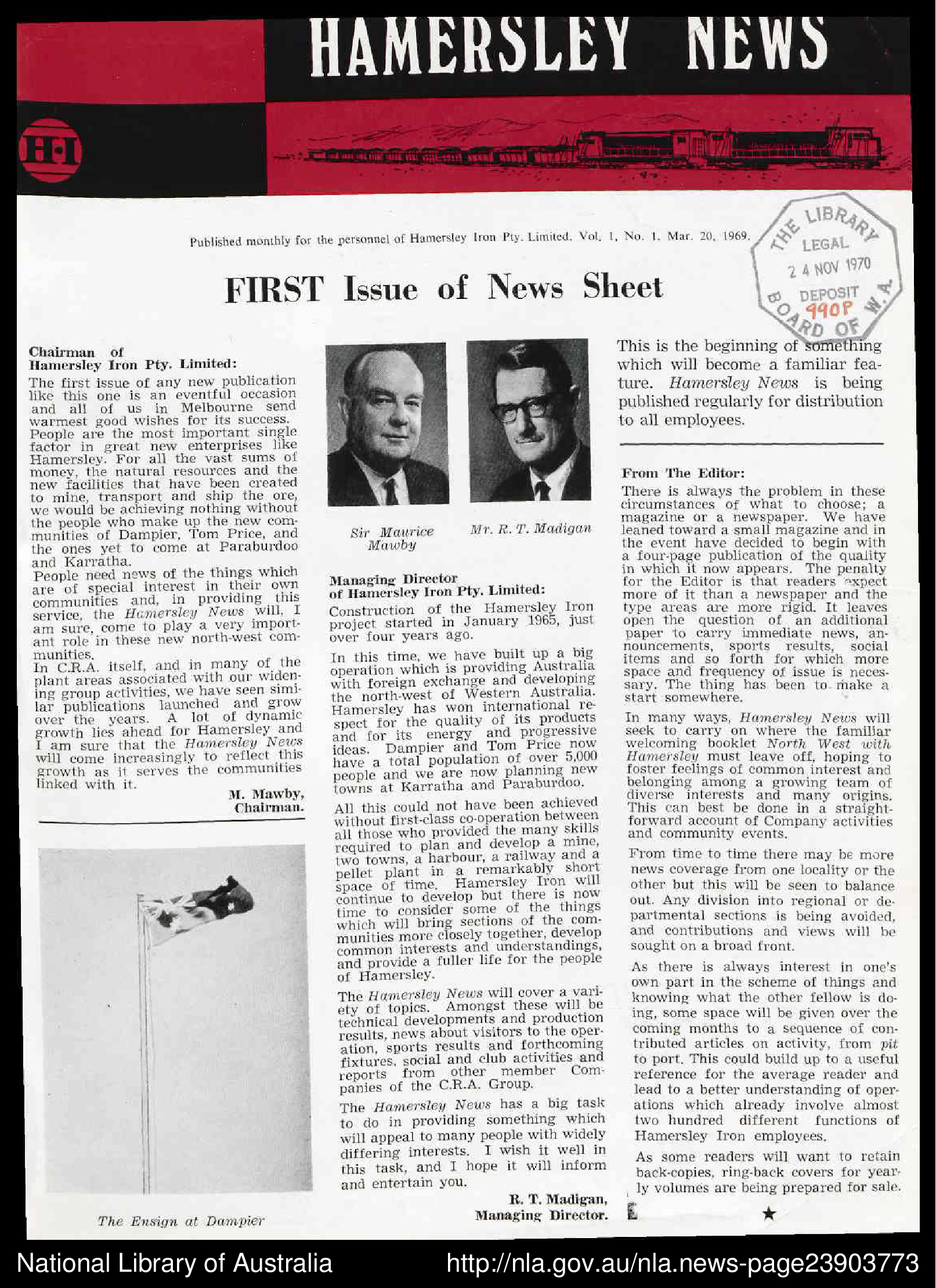
- Front cover of first edition of Hamersley News, 1969
- Type: Fortnightly
- Owner: Hamersley Iron Pty Ltd
- Founded: 1969
- Ceased publication: 1980
- Language: English
- City: Perth
- Country: Australia

Hamersley News was a fortnightly English language newspaper published in Perth, Western Australia by Hamersley Iron Pty Ltd. It was distributed to mining communities in Dampier, Karratha, Tom Price and Paraburdoo.

== History ==
Hamersley News was first issued as a monthly four page magazine for the personnel of Hamersley Iron Pty Ltd. It ran from March 1969 until September 1972, when it moved to a newspaper format.

It provided news on topics of interest to people living in those communities, such as technical developments and production results, as well as news about visitors, sports results, and social activities. It was intended to foster feelings of common interest and of belonging to a community, despite the large distances between Dampier and Karratha, and Tom Price and Paraburdoo.

In the last issue of the magazine, it was stated that Hamersley News would be changing to a free fortnightly tabloid newspaper. It would still cover all community activities and significant company events. It would be complemented by a quarterly review magazine.

As a newspaper it featured a number of personal stories relating to local people. There was also a section called "Women's World" that included various domestic and cosmetic hints and tips, alongside recipes and stories about children and families.

Hamersley News came to an end with its 180th edition. In 1980 the newspaper was purchased from Hamersley Iron Pty Ltd by the Independent Newspaper Group of Perth. It was continued by the Pilbara Advertiser, extending the distribution to Wickham, Roebourne and Pannawonica.

Prior to Hamersley News, newcomers to Hamersley's mining towns were welcomed with the booklet, North West with Hamersley.

== Availability ==
Issues of Hamersley News (1969-1980) have been digitised as part of the Australian Newspapers Digitisation Program, a project of the National Library of Australia in cooperation with the State Library of Western Australia.

Hard copies of Hamersley News are available at the State Library of Western Australia, but access is limited for preservation reasons.

== See also ==
- List of newspapers in Australia
- List of newspapers in Western Australia
- Pilbara Newspapers
- Pilbara Iron
- Rio Tinto Group
