= Gnowangerup Star =

Newspaper in Western Australia

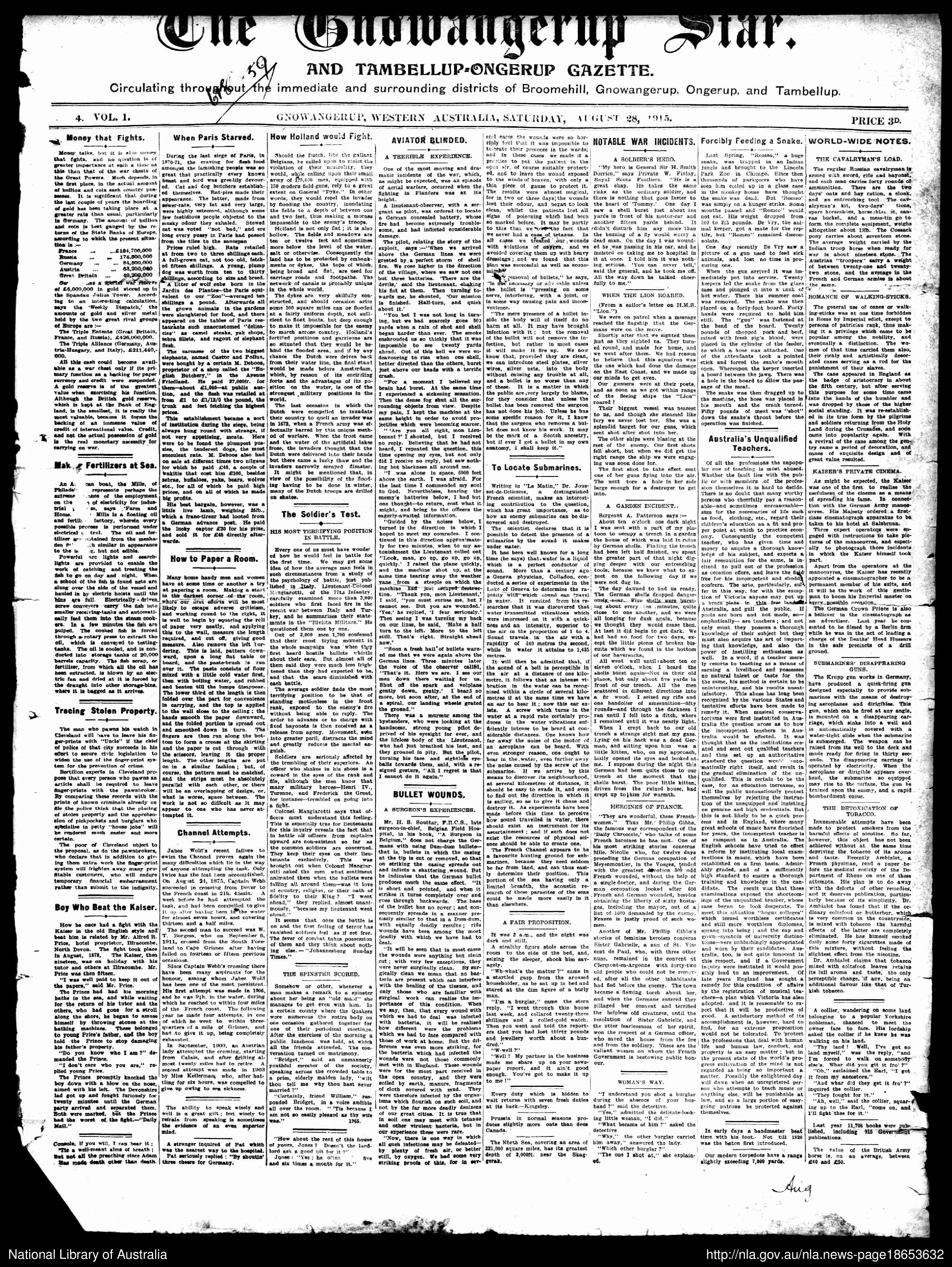
- Type: Weekly newspaper
- Founder: Augustine Walker
- Editor: Margaret Walker
- Founded: 1915
- Ceased publication: 2003
- Language: English
- Country: Australia

The Gnowangerup Star, also published as the Gnowangerup Star and Tambellup Ongerup Gazette, was a weekly English language newspaper published in Gnowangerup, Western Australia.

== History ==
The Gnowangerup Star and Tambellup Ongerup Gazette was established in 1915 by Augustine Walker, with the first issue published on Saturday 28 August 1915. The name was changed in 1942 when it became the Gnowangerup Star.

The newspaper was continued by Augustine's son, Issac Walker. He was assisted by his wife, Margaret, and their two sons, Bill and Roderick. Margaret Walker was the editor, photographer and reporter. She took over the running of the newspaper after Issac had a stroke in 1986. At that time, the newspaper had a circulation of 1000 within the shires of Gnowangerup and Jerramungup in the southern Wheatbelt.

It was one of Western Australia's oldest family owned newspapers and was still set on linotypes up until its closure in 2003. The closure was caused by a number of factors, including insufficient finance to expand the business, declining local populations and the overhead costs.

== Availability ==
Issues of the Gnowangerup Star and Tambellup Ongerup Gazette have been digitised as part of the Australian Newspapers Digitisation Program of the National Library of Australia in cooperation with the State Library of Western Australia.

Microfilm and hard copies of the Gnowangerup Star and Tambellup Ongerup Gazette and the Gnowangerup Star are also available at the State Library of Western Australia.

== See also ==
- Gnowangerup Times
- List of newspapers in Australia
- List of newspapers in Western Australia
