= Gnowangerup Times =

Newspaper in WA, Australia, 1912 - 1918

- Founded: 1912
- Ceased publication: 1918
- Language: English
- Country: Australia

The Gnowangerup Times was an English-language newspaper published from 1912 to 1918 in Katanning, Western Australia, by the Great Southern Herald publishers for the Gnowangerup community.

== History ==
The Gnowangerup Times was published from Katanning, with J.F. Cullen as the editor and publisher. The Tambellup Times, a local newspaper published by the same company, had a similar publication period from 1912 to 1924. Cullen, an editor known for his commentary on Australian federal politics, frequently shared his opinions on the state of parliamentary affairs.

== See also ==
- Gnowangerup Star
- List of newspapers in Australia
- List of newspapers in Western Australia
