= Gerald Henry Fitzmaurice =

British diplomat (1865–1939)

Gerald Henry Fitzmaurice CB CMG (15 July 1865 – 23 March 1939) was a British diplomat.

Born in Howth County Dublin, Fitzmaurice was descended from a minor branch of the Petty-Fitzmaurice family. He joined the Levant Consular Service on June 30 1888 where he passed fourth out of 26 candidates and was appointed student interpreter .. In December 1902 he was appointed to serve on the Joint Commission for the demarcation of the border between the British-ruled Aden Settlement and interior tribes loyal to the Ottoman Empire. In 1905 he was appointed to the British consul as second dragoman to Constantinople. In 1907 he was made chief dragoman, and in 1908 he received the rank of first secretary. He retired from the consular service in 1921.

Fitzmaurice was a Roman Catholic and was buried in a simple grave at St. Mary's Roman Catholic Church, Kensal Green in London.
