= The Daily Telegraph and North Murchison and Pilbarra Gazette =

Newspaper in Meekatharra, Western Australia, active 1909 - 1947

Daily Telegraph and North Murchison and Pilbarra Gazette
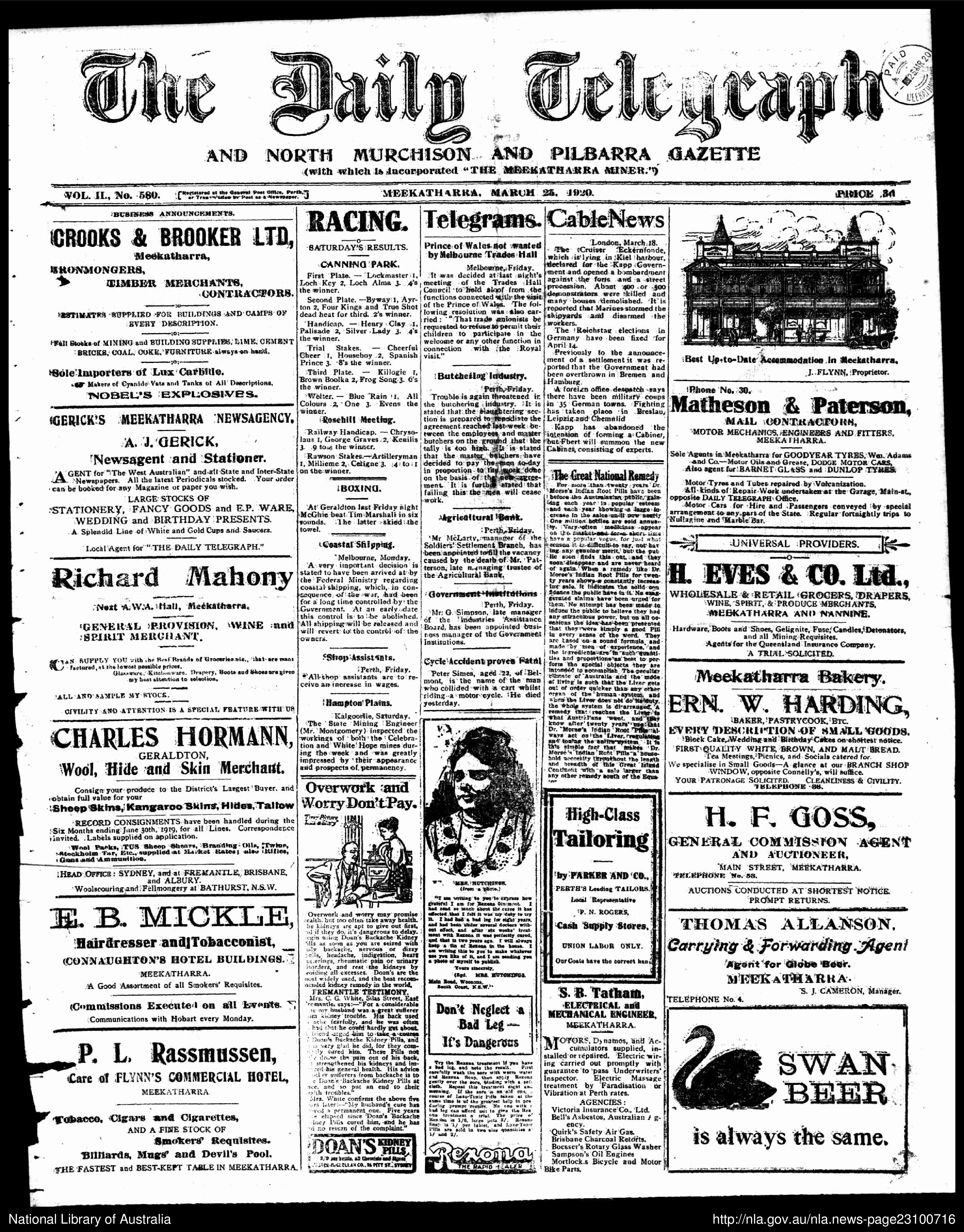
- Type: Weekly
- Founded: 1909
- Ceased publication: 1947
- Language: English
- City: Meekatharra
- Country: Australia

Daily Telegraph and North Murchison and Pilbarra Gazette, also published as Meekatharra Miner and Daily Telegraph and North Murchison Gazette, was a weekly English language newspaper published in Meekatharra, Western Australia. It was distributed to Meekatharra, Nannine, Cue, Geraldton, and the Murchison and Pilbara regions.

== History ==
Meekatharra Miner was published from 7 August 1909 to 6 July 1918, by Daniel James Colgan. It was continued by the Daily Telegraph and North Murchison Gazette, which ran from 8 July 1918 to 18 March 1920. It was printed and published for the Telegraph Printing and Publishing Co. Ltd, by Stephen Thorne Upham.

A daily one page supplement was published between 2 January 1920 and 24 September 1921.

In the last issue of the Daily Telegraph and North Murchison and Pilbarra Gazette there was a small public notice advising readers that the newspaper would be discontinued from that date, citing the reason for the closure as a shortage of staff and the inability to purchase spare parts.

== Availability ==
Issues of the Meekatharra Miner (1909–1918), the Daily Telegraph and North Murchison Gazette (1918–1920), and the Daily Telegraph and North Murchison and Pilbarra Gazette (1920–1947) have been digitised as part of the Australian Newspapers Digitisation Program, a project of the National Library of Australia in cooperation with the State Library of Western Australia.

A daily supplement was published between 2 January 1920 and 24 September 1921.

Hard copy and microfilm copies of the Meekatharra Miner, the Daily Telegraph and North Murchison Gazette, and the Daily Telegraph and North Murchison and Pilbarra Gazette are also available at the State Library of Western Australia.

== See also ==
- List of newspapers in Australia
- List of newspapers in Western Australia
- Pilbara newspapers
