= Great Southern Herald =

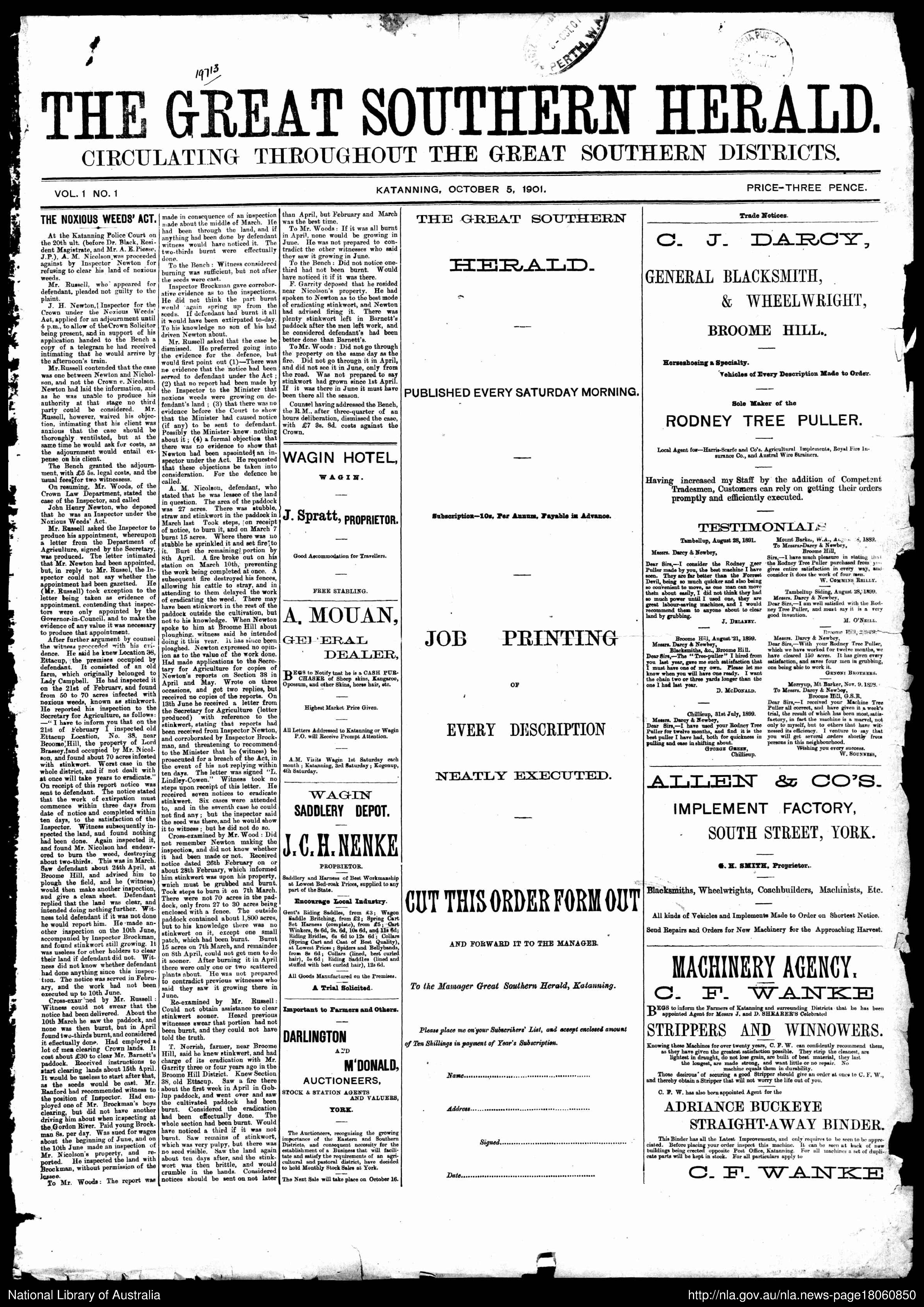
- Page 1 of the Great Southern Herald Vol. 1, No. 1, published on 5 October 1901
- Type: Weekly newspaper
- Founded: 1901; 124 years ago
- City: Katanning
- Country: Australia

The Great Southern Herald is a weekly newspaper published in Katanning, Western Australia. It is distributed to communities in Katanning, Kojonup, Cranbrook, Gnowangerup and Lake Grace.

== History ==
The newspaper was first published on Saturday 5 October 1901 to provide residents in Katanning and the surrounding districts with local and general interest news, including agricultural market reports and advice, local political developments, business and services advertisements, sporting results and social events. The newspaper was designed to facilitate an exchange of ideas through public discussion by encouraging residents to contribute to columns on subjects of public interest.

It was first published weekly on Saturday, then twice weekly on Wednesday and Saturday, then weekly on Friday. As of 2018, it is published weekly on Thursday. The Great Southern Herald contains the following supplements: Southern farmer, Regional lifestyle, Countryman trader and the Great Southern guide. The newspaper absorbed the Tambellup Times in 1924 and the Southern Districts Advocate in 1936.

Circulation as of June 2015 was 949 copies per issue.

The publisher also produced the Gnowangerup Times (1912–1918) and the Tambellup Times (1912–1924).

The Herald produced celebratory volumes for various events in its earlier years.

== Availability ==
Issues (1901–1954) of this newspaper have been digitised as part of the Australian Newspapers Digitisation Program of the National Library of Australia in cooperation with the State Library of Western Australia.

Hard copies of the latest six months of the Great Southern Herald are available on open access at the State Library of Western Australia. Additionally, copies are available on microfilm.

== See also ==
- List of newspapers in Australia
- List of newspapers in Western Australia
