= Collie Mail =

Newspaper in Western Australia

- Founded: 1908
- Ceased publication: 2020
- City: Collie
- Country: Australia
- ISSN: 1321-5361
- Website: colliemail.com.au

The Collie Mail was established at Collie, Western Australia in 1908. The paper was published weekly, initially Saturdays and from 1931 forward Thursdays, to share the news and information of the new coal mining town of Collie.

The distribution area of the Collie Mail covered Collie, Bunbury, Darkan, Donnybrook and Duranillan.

The Collie Mail was in it later years owned by Fairfax Media and then by Australian Community Media. Copies could be obtained every Thursday for $ 1.50 "at Reubens" or by subscription. The last entry on their Facebook page dates back to 30 October 2020. The website is redirected to the Bunbury Mail site.

Nowadays Collie is served by the locally run Collie River Valley Bulletin, which publishes a print edition weekly on Thursdays and maintains a presence on the internet.

== Variant titles ==
The Collie Mail has had a number of different titles over the years it has been in print:

1908–1912	Collie Mail : the Miners' and Timber Workers' Advocate
1913 – Sep 1917	Collie Mail and Cardiff, Lyall's Mill, Collie Burn, Shotts and Worsley Gazette
Aug 1918 – 1 Mar 1919	Collie Mail and Coalfields Miner
8 Mar 1919 – May 1952	Collie Mail and W.A. Coalfields Miner

From November 1916 forward, after the apparent demise of the Collie Miner (1900-1916), the Mail called itself on its masthead "the Only Newspaper Published on the Collie Coalfields". Already in the years before it boasted there of the "Guaranteed Largest Circulation".

== Availability ==
Issues of the Mail from the years between 1916 and 1954 have been digitised as part of the Australian Newspapers Digitisation Program, a project of the National Library of Australia in cooperation with the State Library of Western Australia.

They can be viewed online

- Collie Mail (1916-1954), published weekly

Two more newspapers from Collie have been digitised:

- Collie Miner (1900-1916), published twice weekly
- The Collie Times (1935), published weekly

Hard copy and microfilm copies of the Collie Mail are also available at the State Library of Western Australia.

== See also ==
- List of newspapers in Australia
- List of newspapers in Western Australia
