= The Pingelly Leader =

Newspaper in Western Australia (1906–1925)

- Founded: 3 August 1906
- Ceased publication: 1 October 1925
- City: Pingelly, Western Australia
- Country: Australia
- ISSN: 2205-2321

The Pingelly Leader was a newspaper published in Pingelly, Western Australia from 1906 until 1925. The newspaper was launched by John Mackay, who was previously proprietor and editor of the Wagin Argus and had started the Great Southern Leader of Narrogin, under the management of James Henry Greive. It was originally printed at Wagin for its first few issues but was later issued from Pingelly starting 31 August 1906. The paper changed its name and served a larger area beginning 8 October 1925, becoming the Pingelly-Brookton Leader.
