= The Avon Gazette and York Times =

Newspaper in Western Australia, active 1914 - 1930

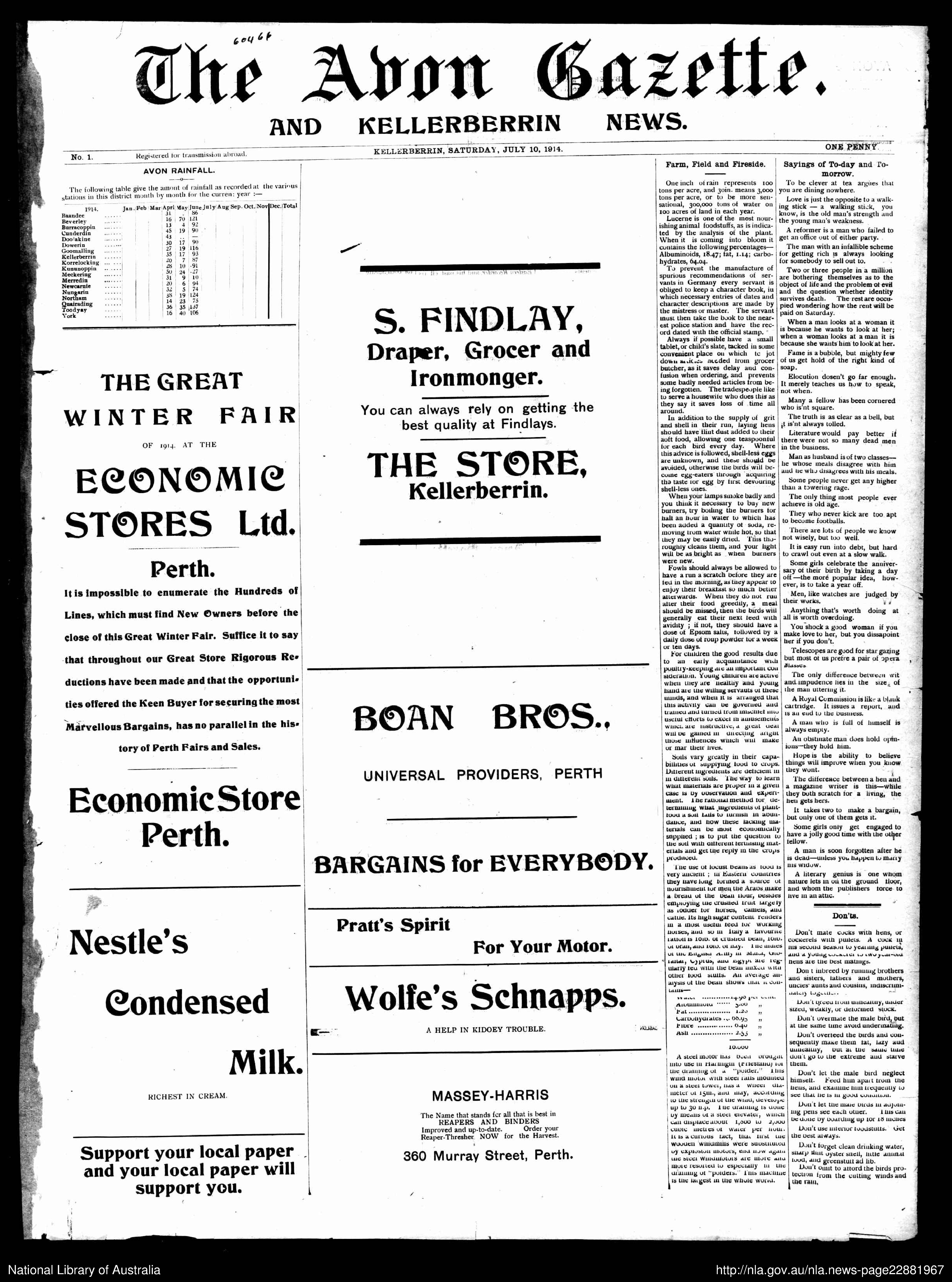
- The front page of the first issue of The Avon Gazette and York Times, under its original publication title The Avon Gazette and Kellerberrin News
- Publisher: The Avon Printing & Publishing Company
- Managing editor: E.W Buckley
- Founded: 1914
- Ceased publication: 1930
- Political alignment: Independent
- Language: English
- City: York
- Country: Australia

The Avon Gazette and York Times is a defunct English language newspaper that was published weekly in York, Western Australia. The newspaper was first published as The Avon Gazette and Kellerberrin News between 10 July 1914 and 8 January 1916.

== History ==
The Avon Gazette and York Times was first distributed on 10 July 1914, under its original moniker The Avon Gazette and Kellerberrin News, by The Avon Printing & Publishing Company on Massingham Street, Kellerberrin. E. W. Buckley, former editor of the Eastern Recorder, was the founder and managing editor of the newspaper.

The Avon Gazette and Kellerberrin News was established to represent the interests of local farmers and facilitate communication between the farming and business communities of Bruce Rock, Dowerin, Kellerberrin, Meckering, Merredin, Trayning and Quairading. The newspaper ran articles on agriculture, mainly wheat production, local and federal politics, and local business and trade. Other news included weather reports, advertisements and social events.

On January 15, 2016 the Avon Gazette and Kellerberrin News merged with the York Times to form The Avon Gazette and York Times. This development saw the removal of The Avon Printing & Publishing Company offices from Massingham Street to Avon Terrace, York. Distribution of the newspaper shifted to Northam, Toodyay and York. The newspaper continued to circulate until 1 August 1930.

== Availability ==
Issues of The Avon Gazette and Kellerberrin News (1914-1916) and The Avon Gazette and York Times (1916-1930) have been digitised as part of the Australian Newspapers Digitisation Program, a project of the National Library of Australia in cooperation with the State Library of Western Australia.

Hard copy and microfilm copies of The Avon Gazette and Kellerberrin News and The Avon Gazette and York Times are available at the State Library of Western Australia.

== See also ==
- List of newspapers in Australia
- List of newspapers in Western Australia
