= Geraldton Guardian =

Newspaper in Geraldton, Western Australia

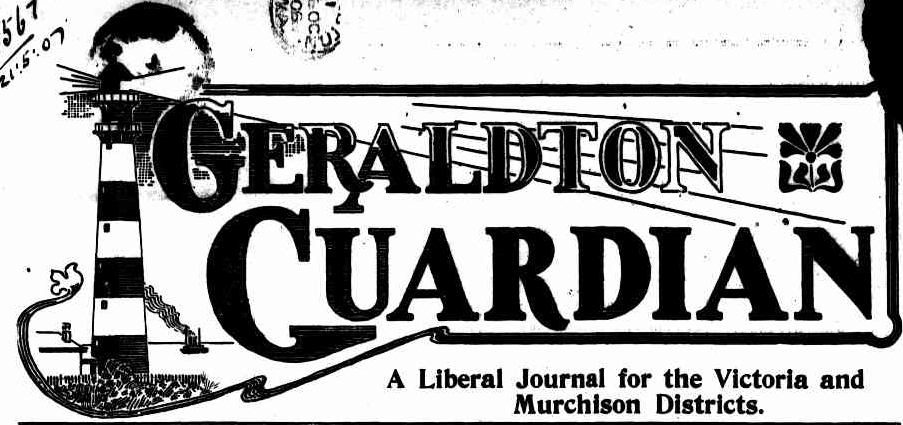
- The original logo of the Geraldton Guardian
- Founder(s): Edward Constantine, Frederick Gardner
- Editor: Kate Campbell
- Founded: 1906
- City: Geraldton
- Country: Australia
- ISSN: 1443-3346

The Geraldton Guardian is a newspaper that was established in Geraldton, Western Australia, on 1 October 1906 to serve the Victoria and Murchison Districts. It was launched on principles of liberal democracy, state rights, nationalism and British preference.

== History ==
=== Founding ===
The Geraldton Guardian was established by the proprietors, Constantine and Gardner, at the "Guardian Buildings", Marine Terrace, Geraldton, Western Australia. Edward Constantine, the senior partner of Constantine and Gardner was born in Cornwall, England but emigrated to South Australia with his parents at the age of three.

Initially the Geraldton Guardian was published biweekly on Tuesday and Friday. It consisted of eight demy-folio pages printed on a demy Wharfedale machine. From 15 October 1907, publication changed to tri-weekly on Tuesday, Thursday and Saturday. It was now bring printed on a super double royal Wharfedale powered by a 5-horsepower engine.

=== Merged 1929 ===
On 1 January 1929 the Guardian amalgamated with the other Geraldton newspaper, the Geraldton Express (established in 1878), and was published as The Geraldton Guardian and Express, an evening daily.

=== Relaunched 1948 ===
On 1 January 1948 it changed its name back to The Geraldton Guardian.

== Availability ==
Issues of the Geraldton Guardian (1906–1928) and (1948–1950) plus The Geraldton Guardian and Express (1929–1947) have been digitised as part of the Australian Newspapers Digitisation Program, a project of the National Library of Australia in cooperation with the State Library of Western Australia.

Hard copy and microfilm copies of the Geraldton Guardian, The Geraldton Guardian and Express and The Geraldton Guardian are also available at the State Library of Western Australia.

== See also ==
- List of newspapers in Australia
- List of newspapers in Western Australia
