= Geraldton Express =

Newspaper in Western Australia

- Founded: 1878
- City: Geraldton
- Country: Australia

The Geraldton Express was a newspaper established in Geraldton, Western Australia

It was founded in 1878. On 1 January 1929 it amalgamated with the other Geraldton newspaper, the Geraldton Guardian (established in 1878), and was published as The Geraldton Guardian and Express, an evening daily.

== See also ==
- List of newspapers in Australia
- List of newspapers in Western Australia
