= Northam Courier =

Former newspaper in Western Australia

- Founded: 16 November 1909
- Language: English
- Ceased publication: 12 May 1922
- City: Northam, Western Australia
- Country: Australia
- ISSN: 2203-7756

The Northam Courier was a newspaper published in Northam, Western Australia from 1909 until 1922.

== History ==
The Northam Courier was the second newspaper published in Northam, the first being The Northam Advertiser. Prior to its launch, the Northam Courier as a concept received a mixed response from other press outlets but was said to have garnered liberal promises of support from the local community.

The inaugural issue was published on 16 November 1909. The Western Mail said of the first issue it "consists of six pages of well-balanced news and advertising matter, and has a distinctly presentable appearance". On introducing the planned ethos of the paper, the Northern Courier said it had the "earnest hope, of winning the reputation of being literal, progressive, and fair".

The paper's final issue was published on 12 May 1922.

== Political affiliations ==
In its later years, multiple outlets described the Northam Courier as an organ of the Country Party, an agrarian party formed in 1913.
