= Great Southern Leader =

Defunct newspaper in Western Australia, active 1907 - 1934

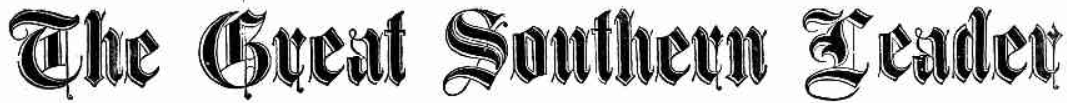
- Founded: 9 August 1907
- Ceased publication: 2 November 1934
- Language: English
- City: Pingelly and Narrogin, Western Australia
- Country: Australia
- ISSN: 2203-7225

The Great Southern Leader was a newspaper published in Pingelly and Narrogin, Western Australia from 1907 until 1934.

== Editions ==
From its launch in 1907 until November 1909, two editions of the Great Southern Leader were published; the Pingelly-Cuballing edition and the Narrogin-Williams edition. In January 1908, these were renamed the Pingelly edition and the Narrogin-Williams-Cuballing edition. The Pingelly-Cuballing edition incorporated The Pingelly Leader.

== History ==
The first issue of the Great Southern Leader featured a quote from the French writer Victor Hugo:

This is more than necessary, it is urgent, therefore we publish it.

Of the inclusion of this quote and the accompanying byline, the Sunday Times remarked "Modesty is a pronounced characteristic of the Great Southern editor".

=== Fire of 1926 ===
The office and printing works of the newspaper at Narrogin were destroyed by fire on 1 February 1926, with the cost of the damage estimated to have been £5000 (equivalent to $449,813 in 2022).
