= The Northern Times =

Newspaper published in Carnarvon, Western Australia 1905–1983

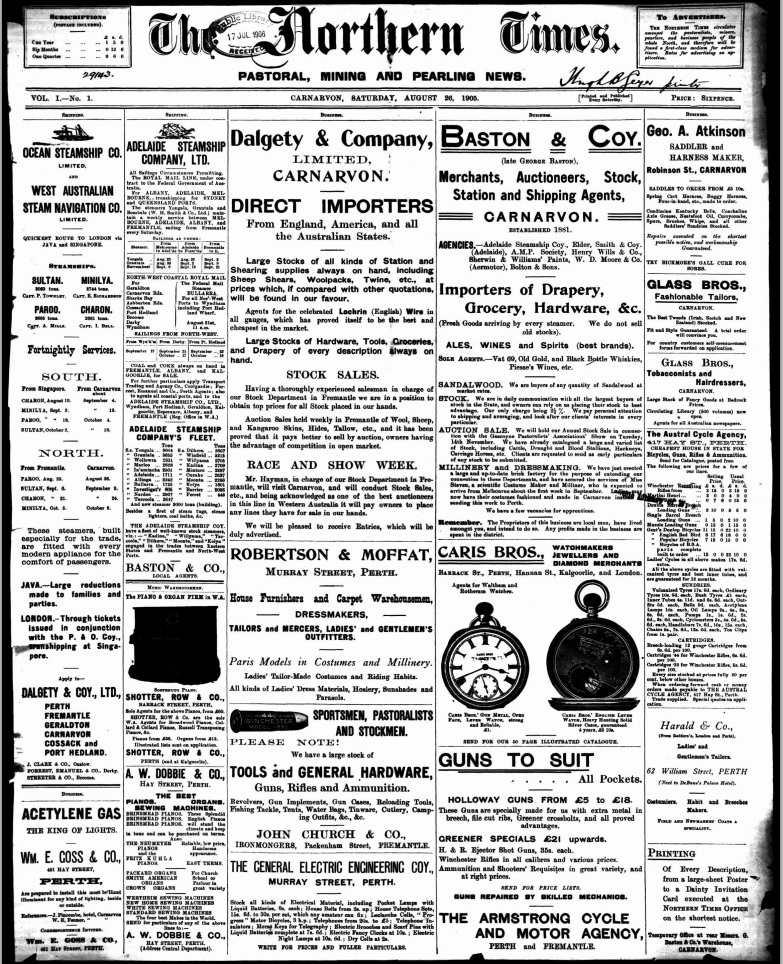
Front page of The Northern Times, 26 August 1905

The Northern Times was a newspaper published in Carnarvon, Western Australia from 1905–1983.

== History ==
The Northern Times was published from 26 August 1905 to 26 August 1983 in Carnarvon, Western Australia.

It absorbed the Geraldton-Greenough Sun and changed title to the North West Telegraph.

It was established as "a paper for the North", with a distribution area covering Broome, Carnarvon, Kununurra, Meekatharra, Wyndham, Cue, Mount Magnet, Mullewa, Sandstone, Wiluna and Yalgoo and was published weekly. The editor was Hugh Bismarck Geyer.

== Digitisation ==
The paper has been digitised as part of the Australian National Digitisation Program of the National Library of Australia.

== See also ==
- Pilbara newspapers
- West Australian Newspapers
- List of newspapers in Western Australia
