= The Northam Advertiser =

Western Australian newspaper

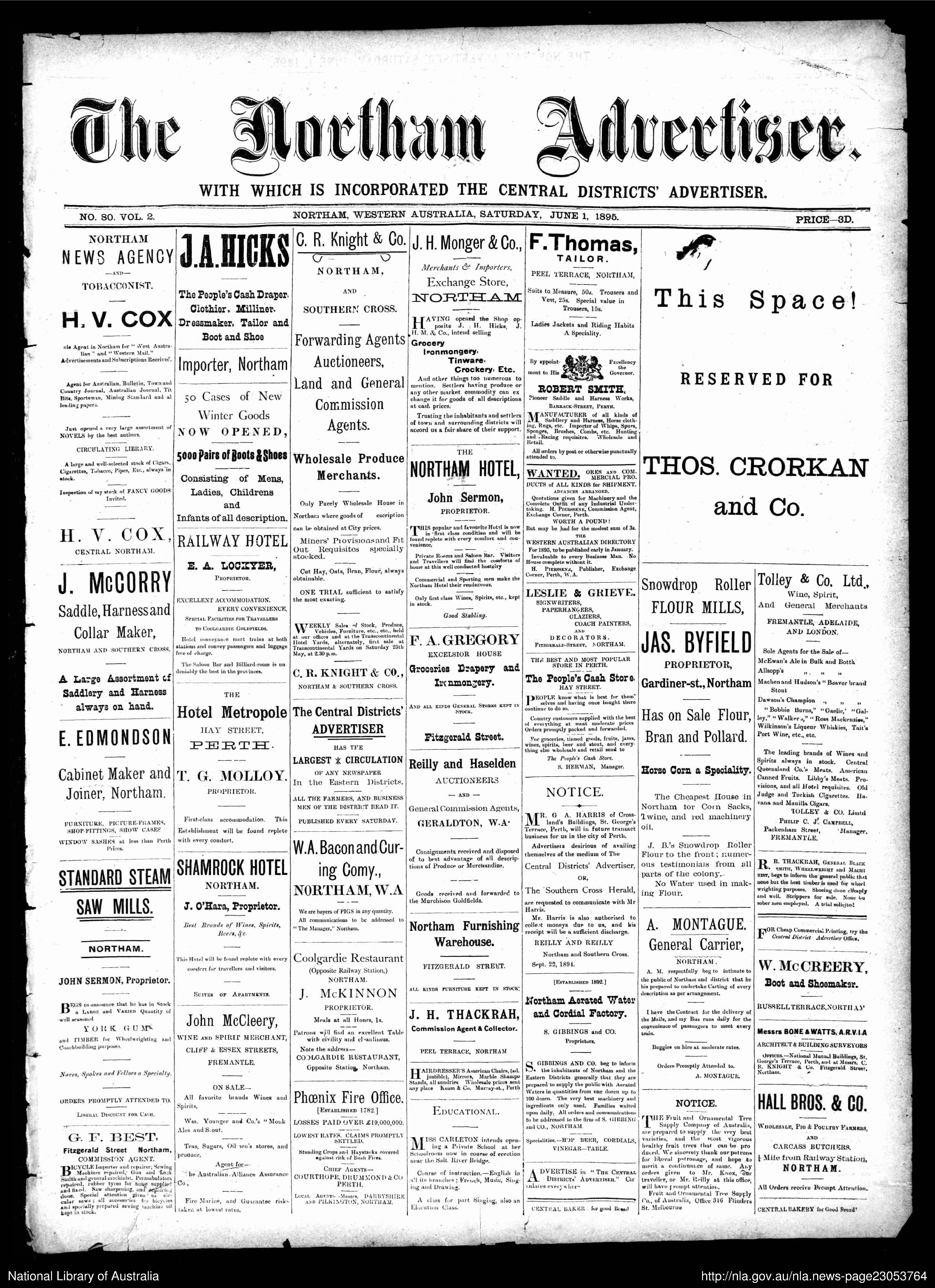
- Front page of The Northam Advertiser, No. 8, Vol. 2
- Founded: June 1, 1895
- Ceased publication: May 27, 1955
- Language: English
- City: Northam, Western Australia
- Country: Australia

The Northam Advertiser was a newspaper published in Northam, Western Australia. It was published from 1895 to 1986. Between 1956 and 1959, it was titled the Northam Advertiser-News. The editorial stance of the newspaper after its founding was studied by a Graylands Teachers College student in the 1960s, and the newspaper was involved in commentating upon the turbulent first ten years of the twentieth century in Western Australian politics following the "post-Forrest era".

== Digitisation ==
Digitised editions of The Northam Advertiser from 1895 to 1915 and from 1948 to 1954 are available on Trove at the National Library of Australia.
