= The Bunbury Herald =

Former newspaper in Western Australia

The Bunbury Herald (1892–1919) The Bunbury Herald and Blackwood Express (1919–1927)
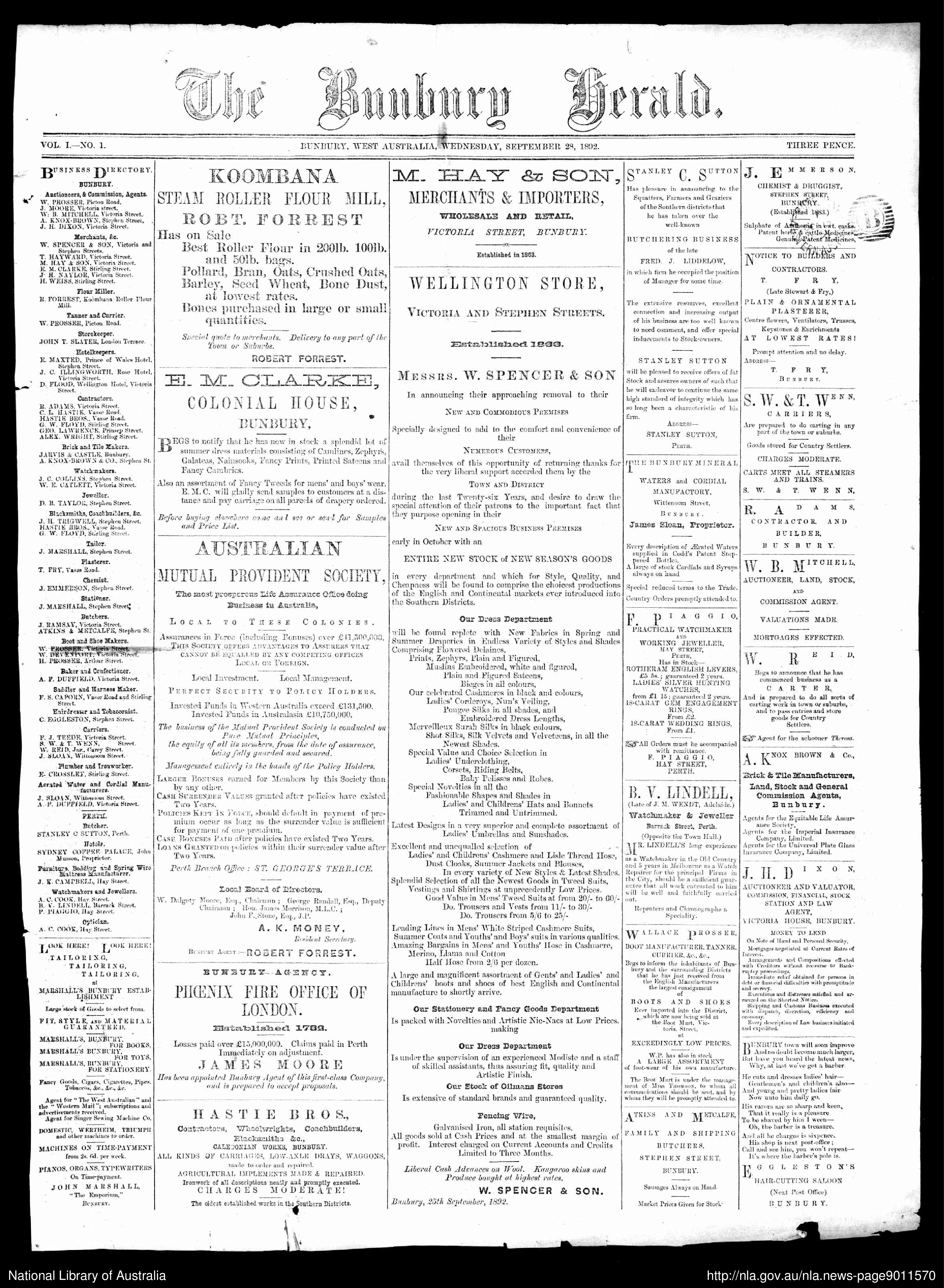
- Front page of the first issue of The Bunbury Herald, 1892
- Type: Weekly newspaper
- Founder: Stephen J Cusack
- Founded: 1892
- Ceased publication: 1929
- City: Bunbury
- Country: Australia
- ISSN: 2200-4181

The Bunbury Herald, also published as The Bunbury Herald and Blackwood Express, was a bi-weekly English language newspaper published in Bunbury, Western Australia. After a merger with South Western Times, it became the South Western Tribune. In 1997 a weekly newspaper named Bunbury Herald was established by Seven West Media.

== History ==
The Bunbury Herald was first issued on 28 September 1892 as a weekly publication; it later moved to a tri-weekly format. The newspaper was founded and edited by Stephen J Cusack.

Cusack was proprietor of the newspaper until he sold it, due to his failing health, on 1 October 1899. Editorship was taken over by George William Keith.

The Bunbury Herald continued as The Bunbury Herald and Blackwood Express, which ran from 16 August 1919 to 20 December 1929. It was printed by Sidney Charles Merriott. In 1929 The Bunbury Herald and Blackwood Express merged with the South Western Times to become the South Western Tribune.

== Availability ==
Issues of The Bunbury Herald (1892–1919) and The Bunbury Herald and Blackwood Express (1919–1929) have been digitised as part of the Australian Newspapers Digitisation Program, a project of the National Library of Australia in cooperation with the State Library of Western Australia.

Hard copy and microfilm copies of The Bunbury Herald, The Bunbury Herald and Blackwood Express and Bunbury Herald are also available at the State Library of Western Australia.

== See also ==
- List of newspapers in Australia
- List of newspapers in Western Australia
