= List of newspapers in Western Australia =

This is a list of newspapers published in Western Australia.

== Major titles ==
Dates	Masthead	Distribution and frequency	Remarks
1830	The Fremantle Journal and General Advertiser	Fremantle; weekly	Manuscript. Precise distribution dates unknown; the only extant issue is dated 27 February. Probably continued by The Western Australia Gazette and General Advertiser
1830	The Western Australia Gazette and General Advertiser	Perth; weekly	Manuscript. Precise distribution dates unknown; the only extant issues are dated 4 April, 1 June 1830 and 13 June 1830. Probably a continuation of The Fremantle Journal and General Advertiser
25 April – 25 June 1831	Fremantle Observer, Perth Gazette and Western Australian Journal	Fremantle; weekly	Sometimes considered to have been continued under the masthead The Perth Gazette and Western Australian Journal.
19 February – 16 April 1831	The Western Australian Chronicle and Perth Gazette	Perth	Manuscript
1831	The Western Australian	Perth	Manuscript
1833	Western Australian Colonial News	Perth	Manuscript
1833	The Inquisitor	Perth	Manuscript
5 January 1833 – 15 February 1840; 7 March 1840 – 26 December 1847	The Perth Gazette and Western Australian Journal	Perth; weekly on Saturday	Not published between 15 February 1840 and 7 March 1840, because of the lack of a compositor; a one-page sheet called The Advertiser was published instead. From 1848 the masthead changed to The Perth Gazette and Independent Journal of Politics and News; survives today as The West Australian.
6 October 1836 – February 1838	Swan River Guardian	Perth	
5 August 1840 – 17 June 1855	The Inquirer: a Western Australian Journal of Politics and Literature	Perth; weekly on Wednesday	In 1855 merged with the Commercial News and Shipping Gazette to form The Inquirer & Commercial News
1 January 1844 – 1 May 1849	The Swan River News and Western Australian Chronicle	Monthly	Published in London, "the joint offspring of a party of gentlemen in Australia, and a few of its friends at home" with a view to publicising and promoting the colony to potential investors and emigrants.
1 January 1848 – 30 September 1864	The Perth Gazette and Independent Journal of Politics and News	Weekly on Saturday	Originated as a change of masthead of The Perth Gazette and Western Australian Journal; from October 1864 the masthead changed to The Perth Gazette and Western Australian Times in recognition of the absorption of its short-lived competitor, The Western Australian Times.
15 February – 28 June 1855	Commercial News and Shipping Gazette	Fremantle; weekly on Thursday	In 1855 merged with The Inquirer to form The Inquirer & Commercial News
4 July 1855 – 11 February 1893; 4 January 1895 – 28 June 1901	The Inquirer & Commercial News	Weekly on Wednesday until 21 March 1888; then bi-weekly on Wednesday and Friday until 10 February 1892; then bi-weekly on Wednesday and Saturday until 11 February 1893; then weekly on Friday. From 17 February 1893 to 28 December 1894, the masthead was changed to The Inquirer and Commercial News Illustrated.	
1 October 1863 – 29 September 1864	The Western Australian Times	Perth; weekly	Absorbed into The Perth Gazette and Western Australian Times
7 October 1864 – 26 June 1874	The Perth Gazette and Western Australian Times: A Journal of Politics & News	Perth; weekly on Saturdays	New masthead following absorption of The Western Australian Times into The Perth Gazette and Independent Journal of Politics and News. In 1874 the masthead was changed to The Western Australian Times.
2 February 1867 – July 1886	The Herald	Fremantle; weekly	
1 July 1870 – 28 January 1871	The Express	Fremantle; daily	
3 July 1874 – 14 November 1879	The Western Australian Times	Perth; bi-weekly on Tuesdays and Fridays	Masthead changed from The Perth Gazette and Western Australian Times because of change of frequency to bi-weekly. From 18 November 1879, the masthead changed to The West Australian
18 November 1879 – present	The West Australian	Perth; bi-weekly on Tuesdays and Fridays until 16 October 1883; then tri-weekly on Tuesday, Thursday and Saturday until 23 December 1884; then daily from Monday to Saturday	Continuation of The Western Australian Times under a new masthead.
15 November 1881 – 5 July 1886	Morning Herald	Perth; daily from Monday to Friday	Absorbed into Daily News
26 July 1882 – 11 September 1990	Daily News	Monday, Tuesday, Thursday, Friday and Saturday until 1901; daily thereafter.	Absorbed Morning Herald in 1886, and The Inquirer and Commercial News in 1901. Not issued on Wednesdays before 1901 because The Inquirer and Commercial News, which was owned by the same partnership, was issued that day.
19 December 1885 – 20 January 1955	Western Mail	Weekly on Saturday until 15 June 1895; on Friday until 8 September 1899; on Saturday until 21 September 1918; on Friday until 27 June 1919; thereafter on Thursday	Continued under the masthead The Countryman
17 February 1893 – 28 December 1894	The Inquirer and Commercial News Illustrated	Weekly on Friday	Temporary change of masthead for The Inquirer and Commercial News
14 September 1895 – present	The Kalgoorlie Miner	Kalgoorlie; Monday, Tuesday, Wednesday, Friday and Saturday until 15 January 1896; then daily Monday to Saturday until 1 May 1976; then daily Tuesday to Saturday until 31 March 1990; thereafter daily Monday to Saturday	Western Australia's only regional daily newspaper.
1 January 1896 – 13 January 1909	Morning Herald	Perth; daily from Monday to Saturday	
19 December 1897 – present	The Sunday Times	Weekly on Sunday	Perth; distributed statewide. From its origin until 1902 was known as the "West Australian Sunday Times"
1897 - 1954	Albany Advertiser	Bi-Weekly, Monday and Thursday	Also published as the Australian Advertiser and the Albany Advertiser and Plantagenet and Denmark Post.
7 September 1900 – 22 June 1951	Westralian Worker	Weekly on Friday	-
21 October 1900 – 4 February 1905	Spectator	Perth; initially weekly on Sunday, later changed to Saturday	
1 December 1900 – 8 November 1979	The Swan Express	Midland Junction; initially weekly on Saturday, later changed to Friday, then Thursday and Wednesday	
25 July 1903 – 29 March 1931	The Truth	Perth; weekly on Saturday until 18 February 1928; thence weekly on Sunday	
5 August 1904 – 30 July 1953	The Call	Perth; weekly on Friday	The Sportsman (1904–1918); The Call and W.A. Sportsman (1918–1920); The Call (1920–1927), The Call News-Pictorial (1927–1931); The New Call (1931–1934); The New Call and Bailey's Weekly (1934–1940); The Call and Bailey's Weekly (1940–1945), The Call (1945–1953). Sister paper to The Mirror, "Western Australia's Critical, Sporting, Dramatic, Motor, Society and Motion Picture Journal"
2 October 1906 – present	Geraldton Guardian	Geraldton; three times weekly	
18 May 1907 – 4 September 1908	The Empire	Fremantle; weekly on Saturday	
18 April 1913 – 22 December 1932	Fremantle Herald	Fremantle; weekly	Known as The Advertiser from 13 May 1921.
27 June 1920 – 11 August 1956	The Mirror	Weekly	Perth; distributed statewide
27 January 1955 – present	The Countryman	Weekly	Continuation of the first incarnation of the Western Mail under a new masthead
6 August 1960 – 29 March 1986	Weekend News	Weekly on Saturday	Weekend edition of Daily News published under a distinct masthead
27 April 1969 – 25 May 1986	Sunday Independent	Weekly	Perth; distributed statewide
September 1977 – present	Subiaco Post	Initially Monthly, then fortnightly in 1978 and weekly from 26 November 1980	Subiaco; Four other suburban editions issued: Nedlands Post in April 1978, Claremont Post in July 1978, Cottesloe Post in August 1979, Cambridge Post (formerly Floreat) in October 1981
8 November 1980 – 2 January 1988	Western Mail	Weekly on Saturday	Unrelated to previous newspaper under this masthead. Losses over seven years estimated at A$50 million.
30 November 1989 – present	Fremantle Herald	Fremantle; weekly	Three other suburban editions also issued: Melville City Herald, Cockburn City Herald and Perth Voice.
1989–present	The Examiner	South-eastern suburbs of Perth	Thursday edition: Armadale, Serpentine-Jarrahdale and Gosnells. Friday edition: City of Canning, Town of Victoria Park

== See also ==
- Gascoyne newspapers
- Goldfields-Esperance newspapers
- Great Southern newspapers
- Kimberley newspapers
- Mid West newspapers
- Pilbara newspapers
- South West newspapers
- Wheatbelt newspapers
- List of non-English-language newspapers in Western Australia
