= Frank Sholl Scott =

Australian-born English rugby union player and medical practitioner

- Born: December 14, 1892; Mount Gambier, South Australia
- Died: May 23, 1974 (aged 81); Claremont, Australia
- Education: University of Adelaide (BA); University of Oxford
- Occupation: Educator
- Known for: Headmaster of Christ Church Grammar School (1936–1942)

Frank Sholl Scott (9 January 1886 – 4 February 1952 (aged 66)) was an Australian-born English rugby union player and medical practitioner. A son, E. K. (Edward) Scott, represented England in both rugby and cricket.

A winger, Frank Sholl Scott was selected for the English rugby team while playing for Bristol RFC in 1906. His sole game for England was against Wales, at Swansea, on 12 January 1907.

Born in Perth, Western Australia, Scott was the son of Penelope Fanny Scott, née Sholl and Edward Scott, an English-born medical practitioner and member of the Western Australian Parliament. Penelope Scott was a member of a family prominent in Western Australia including her father, R. J. Sholl (a Government Resident) and brothers: Horace Sholl, R.F. Sholl (both entrepreneurs and politicians), Richard Sholl (postmaster-general), and Trevarton Sholl (an explorer).

Frank Sholl Scott attended Epsom College (1894–1901), before studying medicine at University College London and Bristol University.

In 1909–11, Scott practised as a doctor at Goomalling, Western Australia and was an Honorary Magistrate (a term used at the time for Justices of the Peace). He returned to England and later lived and practised medicine at Truro, Cornwall.

During the First World War, Frank Sholl Scott served in the Royal Army Medical Corps, with the rank of Lieutenant.

== Bibliography ==
- ESPN (no date), Frank Scott ENGLAND
- The Northam Advertiser (newspaper; Western Australia)
- Alan Scadding, 2014, Index of Old Epsomian Biographies between 1890 and 1914; Doctors: GPs, Consultants and the Most Eminent (Available from: Epsom College website.)
- War Office (no date), card of Scott, Frank Sholl (National Archives, ref. WO 372/17/197681.)
