= Sholl =

Sholl is a surname which may refer to:

- Betsy Sholl (born 1945), American poet
- Brad Sholl (born 1972), Australian rules footballer
- Brett Sholl (born 1971), Australian rules footballer
- Craig Sholl (born 1967), Australian rules footballer
- Eddie Sholl (1872–1952), Australian rules footballer
- Reginald Sholl (1902–1988), Australian lawyer, judge, diplomat
- Richard Sholl (1847–1919), Postmaster-General in Western Australia
- Robert John Sholl (1819–1886), government and judicial official in Western Australia
- Robert Frederick Sholl (1848–1909), entrepreneur parliamentarian of Western Australia

== See also ==
- Sholl analysis, quantitative analysis method in neuronal studies, from a 1953 paper by Dr D. A. Sholl of University College, London
