= Daily News (Perth) =

Newspaper in Perth, Western Australia

- Type: Daily newspaper
- Founder(s): Stirling Bros and Co, Ltd
- Founded: 1882
- Ceased publication: 1990
- City: Perth
- Country: Australia
- ISSN: 1839-8146

The Daily News was an afternoon daily newspaper published in Perth, Western Australia, from 1882 to 1990. Historically a successor of The Inquirer and The Inquirer & Commercial News, its origin is traceable from 1840.

== History ==
Daily News front page of 7 August 1945, announcing the atomic bombing of Hiroshima, Japan.

One of the early newspapers of the Western Australian colony was The Inquirer, established by Francis Lochee and William Tanner on 5 August 1840. Lochee became sole proprietor and editor in 1843 until May 1847 when he sold the operation to the paper's former compositor Edmund Stirling.

In July 1855, The Inquirer merged with the recently established Commercial News and Shipping Gazette, owned by Robert John Sholl, as The Inquirer & Commercial News. It ran under the joint ownership of Stirling and Sholl. Sholl departed and, from April 1873, the paper was produced by Stirling and his three sons, trading as Stirling & Sons. Edmund Stirling retired five years later and his three sons took control as Stirling Bros and Co, Ltd.

Stirling Bros launched the Daily News on 26 July 1882. After 28 June 1901, The Inquirer & Commercial News was incorporated into the Daily News.

Competition from television evening news resulted in losses in circulation and eventual cessation of most Australian afternoon newspapers. The Daily News came to be a wholly owned subsidiary of West Australian Newspapers (WAN), formerly itself a subsidiary of the Melbourne-based Herald and Weekly Times organisation. In the late 1980s, WAN was acquired by the ill-fated Bond Corporation's subsidiary the Bell Group.

In 1986, Robert Holmes à Court sold the Daily News to a small company headed by businessman Simon Hadfield. The newspaper moved to a renovated pie factory on the outskirts of the CBD.

On 2 May 1990, British publishing magnate Robert Maxwell's UK-based Mirror Group bought 14.9 per cent of Bell from the group's managing director, David Aspinall. However, the deal did not proceed, being opposed by the federal government under its media foreign ownership policy. The Government of Western Australia legislated to retrospectively place the Daily News beyond the jurisdiction of the (federal) Trade Practices Commission—a move which the Liberal Opposition condemned as prejudicial to Commonwealth-State relations. The paper was then defunct and in receivership, owing over $15 million, mainly to The West Australian for production costs.

The final issue of Daily News was published on 11 September 1990. Former staff hold five-yearly reunions. WAN was the subject of a successful stock-market float in 1992, following closure of the Daily News.

== Notable former journalists ==
- Alfred Carson
- John Cornell
- James Cruthers
- Frank Devine (editor, Weekend News)
- Boronia Lucy (Bonnie) Giles aka Mary Ferber (1909–1978)
- Kim Hagdorn
- Bill Lang (senior reporter and back page columnist – "Lang's Look")
- Alan Langoulant (cartoonist)
- Arthur Lovekin
- Amanda Platell
- Paul Rigby (cartoonist)
- Kirwan Ward

== Illustrations ==
In November 1893, William John Hardy joined the Daily News as the first pictorial engraver in the state. His first engraving was of Reverend Dr Llewelyn D. Bevan. Prior to Mr Hardy's arrival illustrations were sourced from Melbourne and Sydney. By late 1894 photographic processes replaced illustrating the news with engraved works.

== Publication details ==
The Daily News was published from 26 July 1882 to 11 September 1990. The paper incorporated the Morning Herald from 6 July 1886 and the Inquirer and Commercial News from 28 June 1901.

A Saturday edition ran from 6 August 1960 to 29 March 1986, titled Weekend News. From 19 February 1966 to 3 April 1971 there was an additional Saturday colour supplement, titled Weekend Magazine.

Other supplements include:

- Fremantle News, 28 April 1949 to 7 April 1971
- Fremantle-Cockburn News, 14 April 1971 to 24 May 1984
- North of the River News, 2 December 1959 to 22 February 1961
- Metro, March 1987 to April 1987, a 16-page colour supplement in Wednesday's Daily News.

== Availability ==
Issues (1882–1950) of this newspaper have been digitised as part of the Australian Newspapers Digitisation Program, a project of the National Library of Australia in cooperation with the State Library of Western Australia.

Hard copy and microfilm copies of the Daily News are also available at the State Library of Western Australia.

== See also ==
- List of newspapers in Australia
- List of newspapers in Western Australia
- The West Australian
