= Berckelman River =

River in Western Australia

Coordinates: 16°03′37″S 123°53′47″E

Location
- Country: Australia

Physical characteristics
- Source
  - location: Harding Range
  - elevation: 285 metres (935 ft)
- Mouth
  - location: Sale River
  - elevation: 138 metres (453 ft)
- Length: 28 km (17 mi)

The Berckelman River is a river in the Kimberley region of Western Australia.

The headwaters of the river rise in the Harding Range and flow in a north-westerly direction before discharging into the Sale River, of which it is a tributary.

The river was named the Berckelman on 13 June 1865 by Trevarton Charles Sholl while on an exploratory expedition from the short-lived Camden Harbour settlement (in Camden Sound). Sholl named the river after his mother, Mary Ann Sholl, née Berckelman (1822–1889).

TC Sholl's father Robert John Sholl was the government resident of the North District: all of the Colony of Western Australia north of the Murchison River. TC Sholl was his father's clerk, tidewaiter, postmaster and assistant registrar for the North District. At the time, the government resident's office was based at Camden Harbour, but was transferred to the Tien Tsin Harbor (later Cossack) area in November 1865.
