= Robert Sholl =

Robert Sholl may refer to:

- Robert John Sholl (1819–1886), Government Resident, North District and later Roebourne, Western Australia
- Robert Frederick Sholl (1848–1909), his son, entrepreneur and politician in Western Australia
