= The Sunday Times (Western Australia) =

Sunday newspaper printed in Perth, Western Australia

- Type: Sunday newspaper
- Format: Tabloid
- Owner: Seven Media Group
- Founder(s): Frederick Vosper and Edward Ellis
- Editor: Adrian Lowe
- Founded: 19 December 1897; 128 years ago
- Headquarters: 50 Hasler Road, Osborne Park, Western Australia
- City: Perth, Western Australia
- Country: Australia
- Circulation: 362,000 (as of 2024)
- Sister newspapers: The West Australian
- ISSN: 1442-9527
- OCLC number: 427972890
- Website: perthnow.com.au

The Sunday Times is a tabloid Sunday newspaper published by Seven Media Group, in Perth and distributed throughout Western Australia. Founded as The West Australian Sunday Times, it was renamed The Sunday Times from 30 March 1902.

Owned since 1955 by News Limited, the newspaper and its website PerthNow, were sold to Seven West Media in 2016.

== History ==
Established by Frederick Vosper and Edward Ellis in 1897, The Sunday Times became a vehicle for Vosper's harassment of Charles Yelverton O'Connor and the Fremantle Harbour works, the Goldfields Water Supply Scheme, and Perth's deep sewerage project, from 1898 until O'Connor's death by suicide in 1902. A subsequent government inquiry found no justification for Vosper's campaign against O'Connor.

The paper was purchased from Vosper's estate by James MacCallum Smith and Arthur Reid in 1901. In 1912, MacCallum Smith became sole proprietor and managing director, remaining in that role until 1935, as well as being a member of the Western Australian Legislative Assembly for 20 years. Alfred Thomas Chandler succeeded John Webb as editor around 1920, and was an effective promoter of MacCallum Smith's secessionist views.

In 1935, a syndicate led by Jack Simons and including Victor Courtney and mining entrepreneur Claude de Bernales purchased Western Press Limited, the publisher of the paper, for £55,000. Simons was chairman and managing director until his death in 1949 when Courtney took control. In 1955 Courtney sold Western Press to News Limited.

The 2016 sale to Seven West Media was not opposed by the Australian Competition & Consumer Commission and included certain co-operative arrangements, including sharing of news content between SWM and News Corp, which would also handle Sunday Times and PerthNow advertising sales in Australia's eastern states. The two companies were already partners in Western Australia's Community Newspaper Group. Under the sale agreement, printing and distribution of those 17 local papers and West Australian circulation of The Australian is done by SWN's West Australian Newspapers.

=== Format and circulation ===
To counter decreasing demand for newspapers and competition from radio, television and internet news, The Sunday Times has made adaptations in style and presentation. Its statewide circulation and extensive advertising content make it probably the most profitable newspaper in Australia.

As at May 2023, it had a circulation of 418,000.

In June 2006, The Sunday Times launched PerthNow, an online presentation of local news from News Limited. As of March 2016, third-party web analytics provider Alexa, ranked Perthnow.com.au as the 233rd most visited website in Australia, while SimilarWeb rated the site as the 32nd most visited news website in Australia.

=== Editors ===
Recent editors have been Don Smith from 1987, Brian Crisp from 1999, Brett McCarthy from 2001, Sam Weir from June 2007, Christopher Dore from April 2012 and Rod Savage from June 2013. Michael Beach was the editor from November 2016 until April 2020. As of August 25, 2024, the editor of The Sunday Times is Adrian Lowe.

== Competition-free status ==
Western Australia's diminutive population has not enjoyed a competitive Sunday newspaper since The Independent was bought out by News Limited in 1984 and wound up in May 1986.

Before 1990, Perth had competitive Saturday newspapers (Weekend News and Western Mail (1980–1988)), as well as weekday morning and afternoon dailies (The West Australian and Daily News respectively). A small-circulation state edition of The Australian is printed at The Sunday Times, targeting an elite readership group in a way which does not seriously impinge on the more demotic audience of The West Australian.

A joint venture between the two companies produced many suburban papers under the Community Newspapers banner until Seven West Media bought the remaining stake in 2019. The Community masthead was retired in 2020. Independents that are not produced by Seven West Media include Echo Newspapers, Examiner Newspapers, Herald Newspapers (with Perth Voice), and Post Newspapers.

== 2008 leak controversy ==
On 30 April 2008, members of the police fraud squad conducted a raid on the offices of The Sunday Times—an unusual event for Australian mainstream media—following a state government complaint that confidential cabinet information had been leaked to the paper. An upper-house select committee inquiry subsequently found that no direction had been given to police by any minister, parliamentarian or staffer; and that "the police over-reacted in what should have been a routine search". The committee's findings included criticism of the Western Australian Department of Premier and Cabinet and the Corruption and Crime Commission. It also recommended "that the Attorney General continue to pursue the introduction of shield laws for journalists".

== See also ==
- List of newspapers in Australia
