= Camden Harbor =

Camden Harbor or Camden Harbour may refer to:

- Camden, Maine
- Camden Sound, Western Australia
  - Camden Harbour, Western Australia, a short-lived settlement in Camden Sound.
