= Australian Financial Review =

Australian financial newspaper

- "The daily habit of successful people"
- Cover of the Australian Financial Review on 20 October 2010
- Type: Daily newspaper
- Format: Compact
- Owner: Nine Entertainment
- Founder: John Fairfax & Sons
- Publisher: Nine Publishing
- Editor-in-chief: Cosima Marriner
- Deputy editor: Jessica Gardner (news) and Kylar Loussikian (business)
- Associate editor: Jeremy Sammut (opinion)
- Photo editor: Daniel Adams
- Founded: 16 August 1951
- Language: English
- Headquarters: Sydney, New South Wales
- Country: Australia
- Circulation: Mon–Fri: 47,200; Sat: 56,100
- ISSN: 0404-2018 (print); 1444-9900 (web)
- OCLC number: 1131035760
- Website: www.afr.com

The Australian Financial Review (AFR) is an Australian compact daily newspaper with a focus on business, politics and economic affairs. The newspaper is based in Sydney, New South Wales, and has been published continuously since its founding in 1951. It is currently owned by Nine Entertainment. The AFR is published in tabloid format six times a week, and provides 24/7 coverage through its website and mobile app. In November 2019, the AFR reached 2.647 million Australians through both print and digital mediums according to Mumbrella.

The Australian Financial Review started as a print-only weekly newspaper in 1951, before changing to a bi-weekly in 1961, and a daily newspaper in 1963. The paper now publishes multiple magazines and a supplementary weekend paper, which was launched in 1995. In that same year, the AFR website was also released, which helped to expand its readership base across all media. The AFR, along with most of Fairfax Media, was purchased by Nine Entertainment in 2018.

== History ==
The Australian Financial Review newspaper started as a weekly publication in 1951, published by John Fairfax & Sons. The paper's main objective was to inform the Australian public on business life and news.

In 1961, the AFR converted to a bi-weekly, and then established itself as the first daily newspaper by 1963. Despite other newspapers claiming the title of the first daily national paper, Maxwell Newton was the editor in charge of taking the Financial Review from a bi-weekly to the first daily national paper. During 1961–62, the AFR's primary competitor was The Australian Financial Times, which was in operation for less than 12 months. In the 1960s and 1970s, the AFR developed a strong readership amongst a specialist business audience due to its neutral stance on domestic government policies. In the 1970s, despite the AFR's reputation as a national business daily, many saw it as the primary competitor for The Australian given its high proportion of readers in the AB demographic.

In 1995, Fairfax launched the Australian Financial Review Magazine in response to its growing readership across a wide-ranging audience. The magazine was published to cover topics other than business including leisure, politics, travel, sports, fashion, and other peripheral topics. In December 2019, the magazine recorded an average issue readership of 326,000. Since its launch in 1995, the AFR Magazine has won the 'Best Newspaper Inserted Magazine' (2013-2019), 'Newspaper Inserted Brand of the Year' (2019) and Mumbrella's 'Special Issue of the Year' (2019).

The magazine's founding was followed by the launch of the AFR's website in the same year, which started as a free online source of financial news.

In 1997, the AFR launched its Weekend Edition which extended the paper's publications into the weekend, with an explicit focus of targeting the growing readership base by providing news articles outside of the traditional finance setting.

In 2016, the AFR launched mobile and iPad compatible applications to provide its digital subscribers more accessibility to its news platform. This was aimed at allowing cross-platform accessibility without having to download two separate applications across different device platforms. The application carries similar features to the website including sections such as: Street Talk and Rear Window. The product management team decided to revamp the app due to the wide uptake of smartphones in the Australian market, and to improve their user-interface experience. The UTS Business School was the launch partner for the app, providing logistical advice on the app's delivery. The app's subscription price is included in the 'all premium digital subscription' bundle.

The Australian Financial Review has grown its product offerings since its beginnings as a finance newsroom. It has consistently been well received by the journalism sector as one of the most high-quality newsrooms across Australia. Since the 2000s, the AFR has launched BOSS (magazine for business leadership and strategy) and the Sophisticated Traveller magazine. In 2019, the Australian Financial Review recorded double-digit subscriber growth, as it continued to market its newspaper as the driver of Australian business-people's success and ambitions. In 2020, due to the newspaper company's expansion efforts across different readership bases, the AFR reached 2.647m Australians a month.

=== Evolution of paywall system ===
The AFR first introduced its paywall in 2006, charging online users to view its articles – a payment model that had not yet been utilised by any other Australian newspaper firm. The switch to a paywall was done because the newspaper company thought it could further monetise its niche business audience who could afford it. Following this change, the AFR continued to adjust the pricing of its subscription due to low subscriber growth.

In 2011, it newly introduced a freemium paywall in which only a small portion of articles were free. It has been noted that the AFR's website locks approximately 86% of its online content behind a paywall, higher than its closest competitor the National Business Review. This was aimed at increasing its digital readership which in 2011 amounted to 6,000 subscribers. In addition, it was later determined that the AFR's failures in attracting online subscribers was due to its paywall being too expensive. Its 2012 price of $59 was notably higher than other international mastheads, including the New York Times which was priced at $37.84. As a result, the AFR has since lowered its digital subscription price to $29.50.

=== Partial phase-out of printed editions ===
In October 2022, Nine announced that it would discontinue printing the AFR in Tasmania, with copies to instead be flown in from Melbourne on the following day. The decision was subsequently reversed.

In May 2024, printed editions of the AFR were discontinued in Western Australia, which Nine attributed to an increase in printing costs by its competitor Seven West Media, the owner of the only suitable printing press in Western Australia. In May 2025, Nine Entertainment considered reintroducing printed editions into Western Australia after Post Newspapers opened a printing plant in Perth.

== Features and operations ==
=== Newspaper sections ===
Within the AFR's daily newspaper, regularly scheduled sections include:

- World – news and analysis on global companies and the international business environment.
- Chanticleer – the long-running business opinion column (begun July 1974) that looks into individual companies in-depth, analysing their operations, management and board of directors.
- Accounting & Consulting – Targeted at senior executives and management, this section lays out lateral personnel movements within the finance sector, recent company news, and key participants in the industry
- Education – provides information regarding professional development, the education sector, and news regarding company training
- Companies & Markets – this section features in-depth analysis of the Australian business environment including equity markets, debt markets and the M&A industry
- Legal Affairs – targeted at lawyers, this section provides coverage of the legal industry: its trends and news about the top law firms in Australia
- Property – this section provides analysis of the Australian property market: house prices, commercial properties, developers, REITS, and others. Each major capital city has its own journalism team covering the respective property markets.
- Life & Leisure – this two-day weekly insert focuses on more leisurely topics including fashion, travel, social media, jewellery, etc.

=== Products and operations ===
Across the AFR group, the team does not only publish newspapers. Its range of operations is listed below:

- The Australian Financial Review daily newspaper, founded in 1951, the paper aims to provide information regarding the Australian business landscape.
- The Weekend Edition, delivered on Saturday, covers important business topics as well as general news and leisure-focused topics.
- Afr.com, the AFR's news website, provides online access to a news database with topics including markets, politics, policy, property, and others.
- Sophisticated Traveller – Since 2004, this quarterly magazine has been targeting high net worth individuals, covering content regarding luxury travel.
- Australian Financial Review Magazine – Monthly inserted magazine providing content on high-profile business news, politics, fashion and luxury. The magazine was launched in 1995.
- BOSS - This magazine aims to deliver content to Australia's business seniors about company management, leadership and influential trends.
- LUXURY – A quarterly magazine covering trends in the luxury industry including watches, jewellery, fashion, and others.

=== Financial Review Rich List ===
The Financial Review Rich List aims to compile an annual ranking of the wealthiest Australian citizens. The list was first published in the BRW Magazine in 1984. Since its beginnings, the compilation of the list and its publishing have been taken over by the AFR, now being published annually in the Australian Financial Review Magazine and on the afr.com. Along with the names of the richest people, the list explicates the person or family's net worth and provides a short summary on the business activities and sector they are engaged in. The valuations are conducted by utilising a mix of publicly available information and private consultations. In 2019, the cut-off for making the Rich List was $472m AUD. In 2020, the cut-off was raised to $540m AUD.

== Reporting ==
=== Reporting stance ===
During 1975 to 1983, when The Australian widely articulated its political stance on conservative liberalism, it had been noted that the AFR also promoted neo-liberalism through its news coverage and editorials, exerting influence on the business sphere of Australia and its elitist readership base. The newspaper has also been labelled as one of the propagators of radical liberalism during the 1970s–80s, shaping the policy debate surrounding market deregulation at that time. This was in line with the overarching political stance of all Fairfax Holdings owned newspapers, including the Sydney Morning Herald, which in the 1970s was also right-leaning in its political views.

In the wake of the 1987 stock market crash, the Australian news media sector was blamed for overlooking corporate corruption and wrongdoings, while publishing mainly favourable news articles handed to them from corporate PR teams. Also during this time, The National Times which was Australia's leading financial investigative journalism newspaper, shut down after the stock market crash. Therefore, during the 2000s, following the financial market failures and economic downturn of the 1990s, the AFR's reporting focus steered more towards business investigative journalism, scrutinising big corporations, government power and corruption. This was viewed as the AFR making reparations for its lack of scrutiny over the corporate sector in the lead-up to the stock market crash.

One major factor that allowed the AFR to undertake deep corporate investigations was that it did not need advertising revenue to stay afloat – its cover price was sufficient. On the other hand, all other daily mastheads needed company advertising to stay profitable. This afforded the AFR's editors the flexibility to pursue and publish news articles that shed a negative light on major companies without needing to be concerned about its financial impacts.

During the controversial 2013 tax debate regarding taxes for "extraordinary" profits generated by mining companies, major mastheads from regions with high mining interests had almost fourfold the number of negative articles compared to positive articles. The Australian, the biggest national daily, had a large number of both positive and negative articles, but had a limited number of neutral articles. Out of all the daily mastheads, the AFR published the most articles surrounding the tax debate and also the most number of neutral articles.

=== Endorsements ===
Election	Endorsement
2010	Coalition
2013	Coalition
2016	Coalition
2019	Coalition
2022	Coalition
2025	Coalition

=== Notable reporting ===
In November 2023, the AFR joined with the International Consortium of Investigative Journalists, Paper Trail Media and 69 media partners including Distributed Denial of Secrets and the Organized Crime and Corruption Reporting Project (OCCRP) and more than 270 journalists in 55 countries and territories to produce the 'Cyprus Confidential' report on the financial network which supports the regime of Vladimir Putin, mostly with connections to Cyprus, and showed Cyprus to have strong links with high-up figures in the Kremlin, some of whom have been sanctioned. Government officials including Cyprus president Nikos Christodoulides and European lawmakers began responding to the investigation's findings in less than 24 hours, calling for reforms and launching probes.

== See also ==
- List of newspapers in Australia
- Financial Review Rich List
- List of magazines in Australia
- List of newspapers in Britain
