= Acacia phacelia =

Kimberley cluster wattle

Conservation status
- Priority Three — Poorly Known Taxa (DEC)

Scientific classification
- Kingdom: Plantae
- Clade: Tracheophytes
- Clade: Angiosperms
- Clade: Eudicots
- Clade: Rosids
- Order: Fabales
- Family: Fabaceae
- Subfamily: Caesalpinioideae
- Clade: Mimosoid clade
- Genus: Acacia
- Species: A. phacelia

Binomial name
- Acacia phacelia Maslin, M.D.Barrett & R.L.Barrett
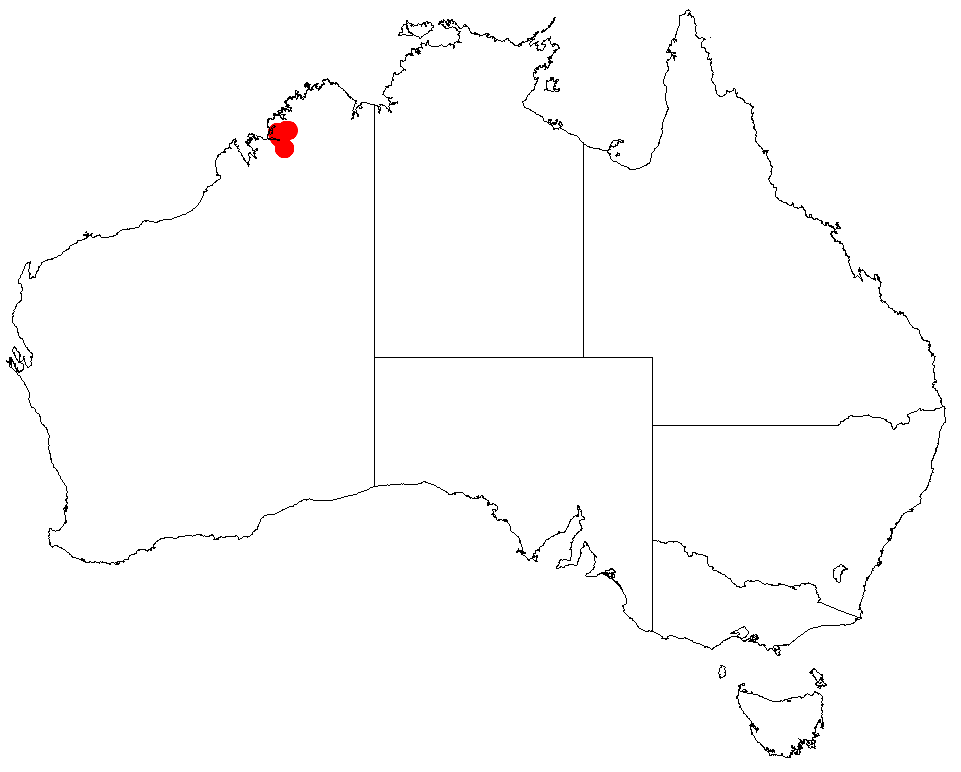
- Occurrence data from AVH

Species of legume

Acacia phacelia, also known as the Kimberley cluster wattle, is a shrub belonging to the genus Acacia and the subgenus Juliflorae that is endemic to a small area in north western Australia.

== Description ==
The shrub typically grows to a height of 0.4 to 1.0 m (1 ft 4 in to 3 ft 3 in) but can be as tall as 1.5 m (4 ft 11 in) and has a spreading, straggly habit. It has slender and terete branchlets that are densely covered in fine soft hairs. Like most species of Acacia it has phyllodes rather than true leaves. The phyllodes occur in clusters of two to eight at the more mature nodes but singly on new shoots. The flat, evergreen phyllodes have a narrowly oblong-oblanceolate shape and are shallowly incurved to straight and usually have a length of 6 to 10 mm (0.24 to 0.39 in) and a width of 0.7 to 1.3 mm (0.028 to 0.051 in). It blooms from between December and January and from May to October and produces obloid to short-cylindrical flower-spikes with a length of 3 to 8 mm (0.12 to 0.31 in). Following flowering firmly crustaceous, red-brown coloured seed pods will form. The pods are straight, flat and linear with a length of 3 to 8 cm (1.2 to 3.1 in) and a width of 2 to 4 mm (0.079 to 0.157 in). and are longitudinally striated. The grey-brown to dark brown seeds inside have a length of 4 to 4.5 mm (0.16 to 0.18 in) and bordered by dull cream tissue.

== Distribution ==
It is native to a small area in the west Kimberley region of Western Australia. A few populations of the plant are known and are spread over a distance of about 100 km (62 mi) from around the Sale River, Synnott Range, Edkins Range and Mount Daglish where it is often situated between sandstone ridges growing in shallow sandy soils as a part of open low woodland communities where it is sparsely distributed.

== See also ==
- List of Acacia species
