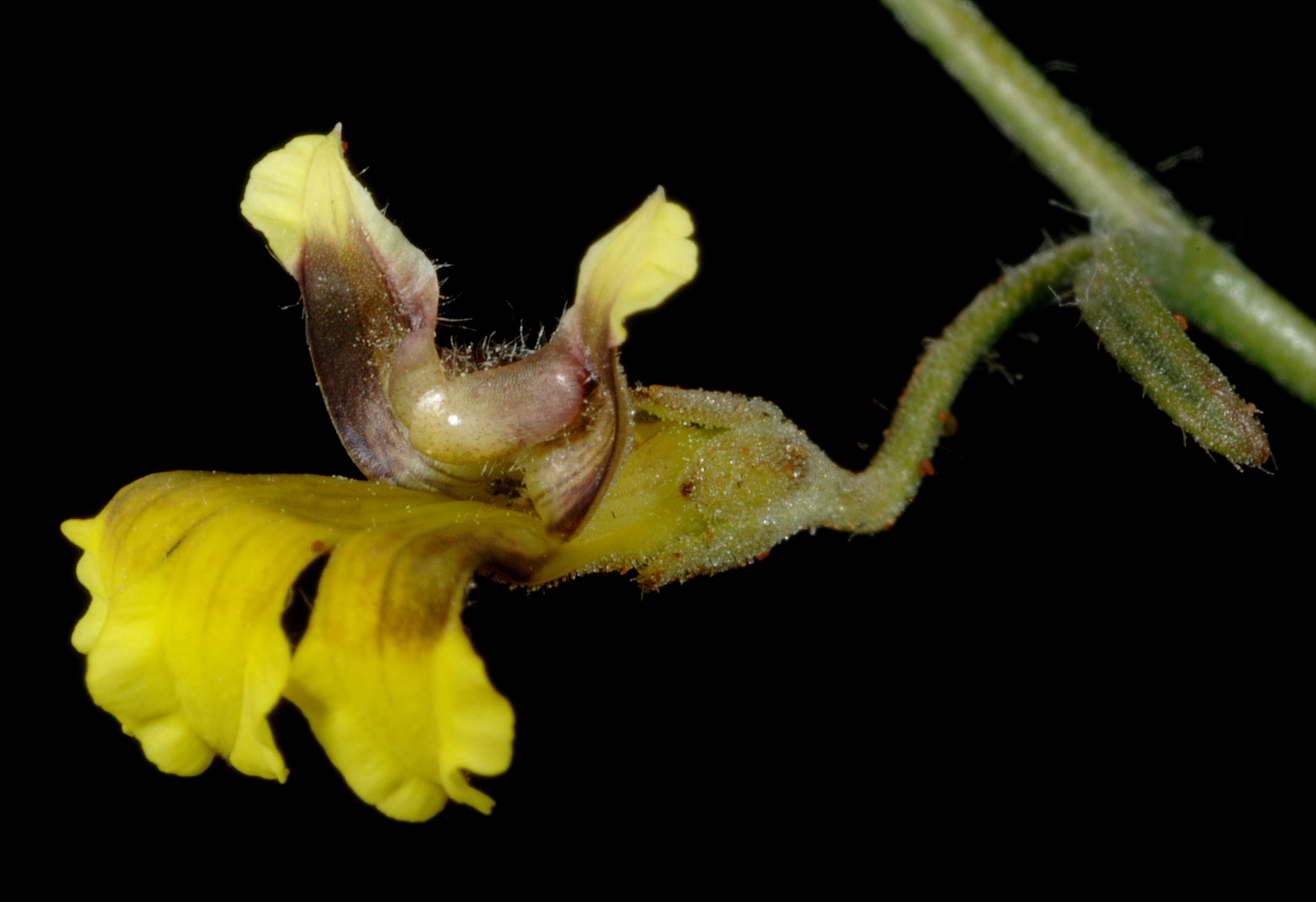
- In the Karlamilyi National Park

Scientific classification
- Kingdom: Plantae
- Clade: Tracheophytes
- Clade: Angiosperms
- Clade: Eudicots
- Clade: Asterids
- Order: Asterales
- Family: Goodeniaceae
- Genus: Goodenia
- Species: G. microptera

Binomial name
- Goodenia microptera F.Muell.

= Goodenia microptera =

Species of plant

Goodenia microptera is a species of flowering plant in the family Goodeniaceae and is endemic to the Pilbara region of Western Australia. It is an erect to ascending, sprawling herb with narrow oblong to lance-shaped leaves sometimes with teeth on the edges, and racemes of yellow flowers with a brownish centre.

== Description ==
Goodenia microptera is an erect to ascending, sprawling herb, growing to a height of up to 40 cm (16 in) and densely covered with simple and glandular hairs. The leaves are mostly arranged at the base of the plant, narrow oblong to lance-shaped with the narrower end towards the base, 40–100 mm (1.6–3.9 in) long and 5–12 mm (0.20–0.47 in) wide, sometimes with teeth on the edges. The flowers are arranged in racemes 200 mm (7.9 in) long with leaf-like bracts, the individual flowers on pedicels 5–40 mm (0.20–1.57 in) long. The sepals are narrow elliptic, 2–2.5 mm (0.079–0.098 in) long, the corolla yellow with a brownish centre, 10–12 mm (0.39–0.47 in) long. The lower lobes of the corolla are 3.5–4.5 mm (0.14–0.18 in) long with wings 0.5–0.8 mm (0.020–0.031 in) wide. Flowering mainly occurs from March to August and the fruit is a flattened spherical capsule 7–8 mm (0.28–0.31 in) in diameter.

== Taxonomy and naming ==
Goodenia microptera was first formally described in 1862 by Ferdinand von Mueller in Fragmenta Phytographiae Australiae from specimens collected by P. Walcott near Nickol Bay. The specific epithet (microptera) means "small-winged".

== Distribution and habitat ==
This goodenia grows on plains, sand dunes and limestone ridges in the Pilbara region of Western Australia.

== Conservation status ==
Goodenia microptera is classified as "not threatened" by the Government of Western Australia Department of Parks and Wildlife.
