= Grevillea donaldiana =

Conservation status
- Data Deficient (IUCN 3.1)

- Priority Two — Poorly Known Taxa (DEC)

Scientific classification
- Kingdom: Plantae
- Clade: Embryophytes
- Clade: Tracheophytes
- Clade: Spermatophytes
- Clade: Angiosperms
- Clade: Eudicots
- Order: Proteales
- Family: Proteaceae
- Genus: Grevillea
- Species: G. donaldiana

Binomial name
- Grevillea donaldiana Kenneally

Species of shrub native to Western Australia

Grevillea donaldiana is a species of flowering plant in the family Proteaceae and is endemic to the Kimberley region of Western Australia. It is an erect shrub or small tree with elliptic, often slightly curved leaves and three-part, creamy-white flowers.

== Description ==
Grevillea donaldiana is an erect shrub or tree that typically grows to a height of up to 10 m (33 ft) and has greyish-brown bark. Its leaves are elliptic, often slightly curved, 90–150 mm (3.5–5.9 in) long, 4–10 mm (0.16–0.39 in) wide and densely covered with fine, silky hairs. The flowers are arranged in cylindrical groups on a rachis up to 150 mm (5.9 in) long, have three parts, and are creamy-white, the pistil 9–12 mm (0.35–0.47 in) long. Flowering occurs from April to November and the fruit is a lens-shaped follicle 20–23 mm (0.79–0.91 in) long.

== Taxonomy ==
Grevillea donaldiana was first formally described in 1988 by Kevin Francis Kenneally in The Western Australian Naturalist from specimens he collected on the banks of the Sale River in 1986. The specific epithet (donaldiana) honours Donald McGillivray.

== Distribution and habitat ==
Grevillea donaldiana is only known from the type location, where it grows in steep, rocky gullies in the Northern Kimberley biogeographic region of Western Australia.

== Conservation status ==
This grevillea is listed as data deficient on the IUCN Red List of Threatened Species, meaning there is insufficient information available to assign a threat category to the species. Its full extent of occurrence, population trend, population size and threats are currently unknown.

It is also classified as priority two by the Western Australian Government Department of Biodiversity, Conservation and Attractions, meaning that it is poorly known and from only one or a few locations.

== See also ==
- List of Grevillea species
