= Trevarton Charles Sholl =

Australian explorer (1845–1867)

- Born: 7 July 1845; Bunbury, Western Australia, Australia
- Died: March 1867; Australia

Trevarton Charles Sholl (7 July 1845 – March 1867) was an explorer of North-West Australia and government official. During the 1860s, he undertook expeditions to the regions known later as the Kimberley and Pilbara. In March 1867, at the age of 21, Sholl was lost at sea and presumed dead, when the schooner Emma disappeared, during a storm.

Sholl was born in Bunbury and was the son of R. J. (Robert) Sholl – prominent as a government official, magistrate and explorer. Trevarton Sholl's siblings included R. A. (Richard) Sholl, later Postmaster General of Western Australia and the entrepreneurs and politicians R. F. (Robert) Sholl and Horace Sholl.

In 1865, while working as a government clerk under his father – who was Government Resident for the North District of Western Australia – Trevarton Sholl accompanied Alexander McRae on an expedition to the Glenelg River area. During this period he named the Berckelman River after his mother, Mary Ann Sholl, née Berckelman. Later in 1865, the Government Resident's camp was relocated from the short-lived Camden Harbour settlement to Mount Welcome (which became the basis of the town of Roebourne).

During an 1866 expedition with Charles Broadhurst, Sholl searched for pasture and natural harbours in the area around Exmouth Gulf.

== Memorials ==
- Mount Trevarton, near the Ashburton River.
- Trevarton Creek, in Karijini National Park.
- Until 1894, Loftus Street in West Perth and Subiaco, was known as Trevarton Street.

== See also ==
- List of people who disappeared mysteriously at sea
