= Pimelea concreta =

Scientific classification
- Kingdom: Plantae
- Clade: Tracheophytes
- Clade: Angiosperms
- Clade: Eudicots
- Clade: Rosids
- Order: Malvales
- Family: Thymelaeaceae
- Genus: Pimelea
- Species: P. concreta

Binomial name
- Pimelea concreta F.Muell.

Synonyms
- Banksia concreta (F.Muell.) Kuntze; Pimelea brevituba Fawc.; Thecanthes concreta (F.Muell.) Rye

Species of shrub

Pimelea concreta is a species of flowering plant in the family Thymelaeaceae and is native to northern Australia and parts of Indonesia. It is an annual herb with narrowly egg-shaped leaves and head-like clusters of white or pink, tube-shaped flowers surrounded by egg-shaped green involucral bracts.

== Description ==
Pimelea concreta is an annual herb that typically grows to a height of 20–80 cm (7.9–31.5 in) and has glabrous stems that are often deep red at the base. The leaves are narrowly egg-shaped, sometimes with the narrower end towards the base, 9–44 mm (0.35–1.73 in) long and 2–6.5 mm (0.079–0.256 in) wide. The flowers are white or pink, borne on a peduncle 10–105 mm (0.39–4.13 in) long and surrounded by green, broadly egg-shaped involucral bracts 3–6 mm (0.12–0.24 in) long and 4–15 mm (0.16–0.59 in) wide. The floral tube is 9–12 mm (0.35–0.47 in) long, the sepals 2.5–3.5 mm (0.098–0.138 in) long. Flowering occurs from January to June.

== Taxonomy ==
Pimelea concreta was first formally described in 1865 by Ferdinand von Mueller in Fragmenta Phytographiae Australiae from specimens collected by John Septimus Roe at Camden Harbour. The specific epithet (concreta) means "grown together", referring to the fused involucral bracts.

== Distribution and habitat ==
This pimelea grows in woodland between Camden Harbour in the Kimberley of Western Australia and in the Top End of the Northern Territory. It also occurs on the Lesser Sunda Islands.

== Conservation status ==
Pimelea concreta is listed as "not threatened" by the Government of Western Australia Department of Biodiversity, Conservation and Attractions and as of "least concern" under the Northern Territory Territory Parks and Wildlife Conservation Act.
