= Kirwan Ward =

Australian journalist (1909–1983)

Edward Bernard Kirwan Ward (2 April 1909 – 5 March 1983) was a journalist most notable for his work with the Daily News in Perth, Western Australia.

== Early life ==
Kirwan Ward was born in Shotover, Oxfordshire one of eight children of Norman and Bertha Kirwan Ward. At the age of 18 he moved with his family to Australia. In Perth he worked a number of jobs including work as an insurance clerk and a shoe salesman.

== War ==
Kirwan Ward joined the Royal Australian Naval Volunteer Reserve in 1942 and was discharged in 1946.

== Writing ==
Jim Macartney, editor of the Daily News in Perth offered him a backpage daily column in the newspaper when he left active service. From 1954 he was joined by cartoonist Paul Rigby who often travelled on assignment with Kirwan Ward. The column, Peepshow, written under the pen name Kirwan Ward was published six days a week from 1946 until 1974. From 1974 until his death in 1983 he published two columns a week.

== Honours ==
In 1978 he was made an MBE.
