= Kim Hagdorn =

Australian cricketer and journalist

Kim John Hagdorn (born 8 April 1955) is a former first-class cricketer and Australian sports journalist.

== Cricket career ==
Hagdorn was selected as a right-arm medium-fast bowler and played the opening match for the West Australian first-class cricket side in the 1977/78 Sheffield Shield season. He only bowled 6 overs for no wickets and did not get to bat as Western Australia beat Tasmania by an innings and 14 runs. He was replaced for the next match by Wayne Clark and was not selected again.

== Journalism career ==
After his brief foray with the state cricket team, Hagdorn moved to sports journalism and became the chief Australian rules football writer for The Sunday Times in Perth. He also appears on Triple M as a reporter for West Australian AFL games and was a regular contributor to 6PR's football coverage. He previously held a position as Communications Manager at the Western Australian Cricket Association.

In 2007 he was awarded the Geoff Christian Media Award and the Jack Lee Best News Story Award by the WA Football Media Guild.

In 2008 he was again awarded the Jack Lee Award for Best Football News Story by the WA Football Media Guild. In 2015 and 2016 he won both the best overall news story and best radio news story for his reports on Matt Priddis' injury (2015) and on Sam Mitchell's move to the West Coast Eagles (2016).
