= Paul Rigby =

Australian cartoonist (1924–2006)

Paul Crispin Rigby
- Born: 25 October 1924; Sandringham, Melbourne
- Died: 15 November 2006 (aged 82); Margaret River, Western Australia
- Occupation: Painter / cartoonist / illustrator
- Years active: 1948-1979
- Spouse: Marlene Cockburn (1956-2006)
- Children: Two sons, three daughters
- Awards: Order of Australia (1999); Walkley Cartoon Award (1960, 1961, 1963, 1966, 1969); New York Press Club Award (1981); Newspaper Guild Page One Award (1983, 1984, 1985, 1986)

Paul Crispin Rigby AM (25 October 1924 – 15 November 2006) was an Australian cartoonist who worked for newspapers in Australia, the United Kingdom and the United States. He usually worked under the name Rigby.

== Early life ==
Rigby was born in Sandringham, Victoria, on 25 October 1924, the second son of James Rigby, a telephone engineer, and his wife Violet Wood. He studied art at Brighton Technical School before leaving at 15 to work as a commercial artist, eventually taking up freelance work.

Rigby was a gunner-armourer in the Royal Australian Air Force during World War II from 1942 to 1946, serving primarily in bombers in North Africa and Europe.

== Career ==
Rigby worked as a commercial artist and teacher before moving to Perth to work as an illustrator for West Australian Newspapers (1948–52), notably on the Western Mail. His work as a political cartoonist started at the Daily News (Perth) in 1952, where he won five Walkley Awards between 1960 and 1969.

From 1949 his work coincided with that of topical columnist Bernie Kirwan Ward on the back page of the Daily News. The pair published a number of books containing reprints of their popular collaborations.

From 1959 Rigby's cartoons were syndicated to various newspapers throughout Australia.

Rigby worked briefly at Rupert Murdoch's Sydney Daily Mirror from 1969. Murdoch had just purchased English tabloid The Sun and in the same year Rigby relocated to London to work on Murdoch's new acquisition. He spent eight years on the New York Daily News and for 15 years was the main cartoonist on the New York Post. Rigby also contributed work to the News of the World, the German Springer Group and the U.S. National Star.

Rigby returned to Australia in 1974 to work at the Sydney Daily Telegraph and then moved to the United States to work at another new Murdoch acquisition, the New York Post, also contributing to the Star. From 1984 to 1992, he worked at the New York Daily News.

Many later artists were influenced by his book Paul Rigby's Course of Drawing and Cartooning (1976), which was privately published. He illustrated more than 30 books and produced a number of collections of his drawings.

=== Style ===
Rigby's trademark urchin

Rigby worked in pen and ink on Bristol board.

In much the same way that Al Hirschfeld concealed the name "NINA" in his own drawings, Rigby usually included hard-to-find images of a tiny dog and a small boy (referred to as "the urchin") somewhere in his cartoons.

=== Awards ===
Rigby is a recipient of an Order of Australia for services to cartooning (1999).

He won five Walkley Awards, a New York Press Club Award in 1982, and US Newspaper Guild's Page One Award in 1983, 1984, 1985, and 1986.

== Limp falling club ==
Paul Rigby is credited with founding the Limp Falling Association in Perth in the late 1950s.

"Limp falling" is the art of going limp and falling to the ground. It is usually practiced unannounced in a public place, typically a pub. People working in Perth's media began limp falling while drinking at the Palace Hotel (to the bemusement of other patrons).

== Personal life ==
Rigby married the radio and television journalist Marlene Cockburn in Perth in 1956. They had two sons and three daughters.

Rigby and his wife had retired to Margaret River, Western Australia in 2003, where they established a gallery and studio. He died of a heart attack on 15 November 2006.
