= Boronia Lucy Giles =

Australian journalist (1909–1978)

- aka Mary Ferber (from 1942 newspaper)
- Born: Boronia Lucy Sanderson; 25 August 1909; Collie, Western Australia
- Died: 2 May 1978 (aged 68); Maylands, Western Australia
- Other names: Mary Ferber, Auntie Nell, Peg Pegotty
- Occupation: journalist

Boronia Lucy "Bonnie" Giles (née Sanderson; 25 August 25, 1909 – 2 May 1978) was an Australian journalist who wrote under the pen names Mary Ferber, Auntie Nell and Peg Pegotty. Mary Ferber's advice column in Perth's Daily News ran for twenty years.

== Life ==
Giles was born in 1909 in Collie in Western Australia. She was the third child of Jessie Mary (born Cosham) and her husband Arthur Sanderson. Her mother came from Queensland and her father, an engine driver, had been born in Britain. She went to Perth Modern School for over four years after she won a scholarship and in 1927 she became a part-time student at the University of Western Australia. She briefly worked for a car company before she started work at the Daily News in Perth. This paper dated back to 1882. Between 1929 and 1931 she endeavoured to obtain a journalism qualification but she could not find the time. She married another journalist on 30 December 1932.

Using the nom de plume of Mary Ferber she wrote an advice column for twenty years. "Mary Ferber" was well known with her own banner and she held influence over her readers. Giles was able to raise money for charitable causes of her choosing by getting "Mary Ferber" to ask for donations. Her causes included slow learning children, radios for the elderly and assistance for unmarried mothers. Under the pseudonyms of Peg Pegotty and Auntie Nell she wrote for children who were reading the paper. She would write poems and stories and she was able to illustrate these with her own sketches.

== Death ==
She retired in 1969. Giles died in 1978 in the Perth suburb of Maylands.

Ferber Place, in the Canberra suburb of Gilmore, is named in her honour.
