= Sale River =

River in Kimberley region of Western Australia

Coordinates: 15°58′21″S 124°35′44″E

Location
- Country: Australia

Physical characteristics
- Source
  - location: Spong Pyramid
  - elevation: 275 meters (902 ft)
- Mouth
  - location: Doubtful Bay, Timor Sea
  - elevation: Sea level
- Length: 109 kilometres (68 mi)
- Basin size: 1,438 square kilometres (555 sq mi)

The Sale River is a river in the Kimberley region of Western Australia. The river was seen and named on 9 June 1865 by an expedition from the short-lived Camden Harbor settlement (in Camden Sound) searching for pastoral land. The expedition comprised Alexander McRae, Trevarton Sholl, PC William Gee, John Stainer and an Aboriginal constable named Billy.

The headwaters of the river rise near Spong Pyramid at the southern edge of the Elizabeth and Catherine Range and flow in a westerly direction before discharging into Doubtful Bay near Storr Island. The only tributary of the Sale is the Berckelman River, which was named after the family of Trevarton Sholl's mother.

The mouth of the Sale River at Doubtful Bay has a depth of about 30 metres (98 ft) but the mouth itself is blocked by a rock bar at low tide. Cruise boats regularly enter the river from the bay and many anchorages exist along the length of the river with gorges and sandy beaches that are popular with tourists.
