= Forlorn Hope (boat) =

Boat used for an expedition in 1865

Forlorn Hope was the name given by a group of seven men to an open boat in which they sailed and rowed from Adam Bay, Northern Territory to Champion Bay, Western Australia, a distance of some 2,000 miles (3,200 km) in May–August 1865.

== Background ==
In 1863, after the successful crossing of Australia south to north by Stuart proved that a road (and telegraph line) through the centre was possible, the British Government made South Australia responsible for the Northern Territory, "So much of New South Wales as lies to the northward of the 26th parallel of South Australia, and between the 126th and 138th degree of east longitude, together with bays, gulfs, and islands adjacent". A Bill was passed authorizing the survey and sale of 500,000 acres in the Territory, half the proceeds going to Britain, the other half to South Australia. Country land would be sold in multiples of 160 acres, with half an acre of town land included in the sale (echoes of the Wakefield scheme for the colonization of South Australia). G. S. Kingston opposed, saying "I think it is quite enough for us to look after our own affairs without accepting this white elephant." The Bill passed with little enthusiasm but no real opposition, and provided for appointment of a Government Resident who would take a party to the Top End, select a site for the principal town, and survey it into half-acre lots. Boyle Travers Finniss was in 1864 appointed to that position at a salary of £1,000 p.a., an appointment some saw as a sinecure for an ex-Premier down on his luck. He was given a staff of 40 officers and men. The Government schooner Beatrice, 99 tons, Commander Hutchinson RN, left for Adam Bay on 22 April, and completed a survey of that harbour. The barque Henry Ellis, 464 tons, Captain Thomas Phillips, was chartered for conveyance of livestock, personnel and stores, left Port Adelaide 29 April 1864. The Government schooner Yatala, F. Humbert, master, was to assist and carry mails. On 20 June 1864 Henry Ellis ran aground on what is now Henry Ellis Reef, previously uncharted, then moored at Adam Bay and began unloading equipment and provisions.

The survey, which was expected to be a straightforward affair, turned out to be a quagmire, figuratively and literally. Finniss, chosen for his background as a leader and as a surveyor proved inept at both. He was more interested in drilling his guard than guarding his stores, more interested in securing his own accommodation than that of his officers. Above all, he stuck to his original choice of Escape Cliffs and The Narrows as town sites, against the advice of his officers. He was impressed with the Adelaide River as a means of communicating with the hinterland, not "landlocked" like other sites such as Port Darwin. If this meant surveying marshland, so be it: Port Adelaide was once a low-lying swamp. He suspended several of those who gave contrary opinions, and elevated those who agreed with him, including his own son. He sacked the Surgeon, whose secondary appointment was Protector of Aborigines, for attempting to forestall or ameliorate sorties against the local Aboriginal people, who had stolen stores and equipment and speared a number of horses, several fatally.

Many men whose one-year contract was up, left for home aboard Bengal in May 1865 – a long trip, as it was to sail via Koepang. Another 39 left aboard Ellen Lewis in December, including Finniss, recalled to face various disciplinary charges, and four (Edmunds, Ryan, Young, and Tuckwell) transferred to McKinlay's exploration party, leaving Manton in charge of a rump staff, with little to do but protect their stores.

See also Survey parties to the Northern Territory 1864–1870.

== The journey ==
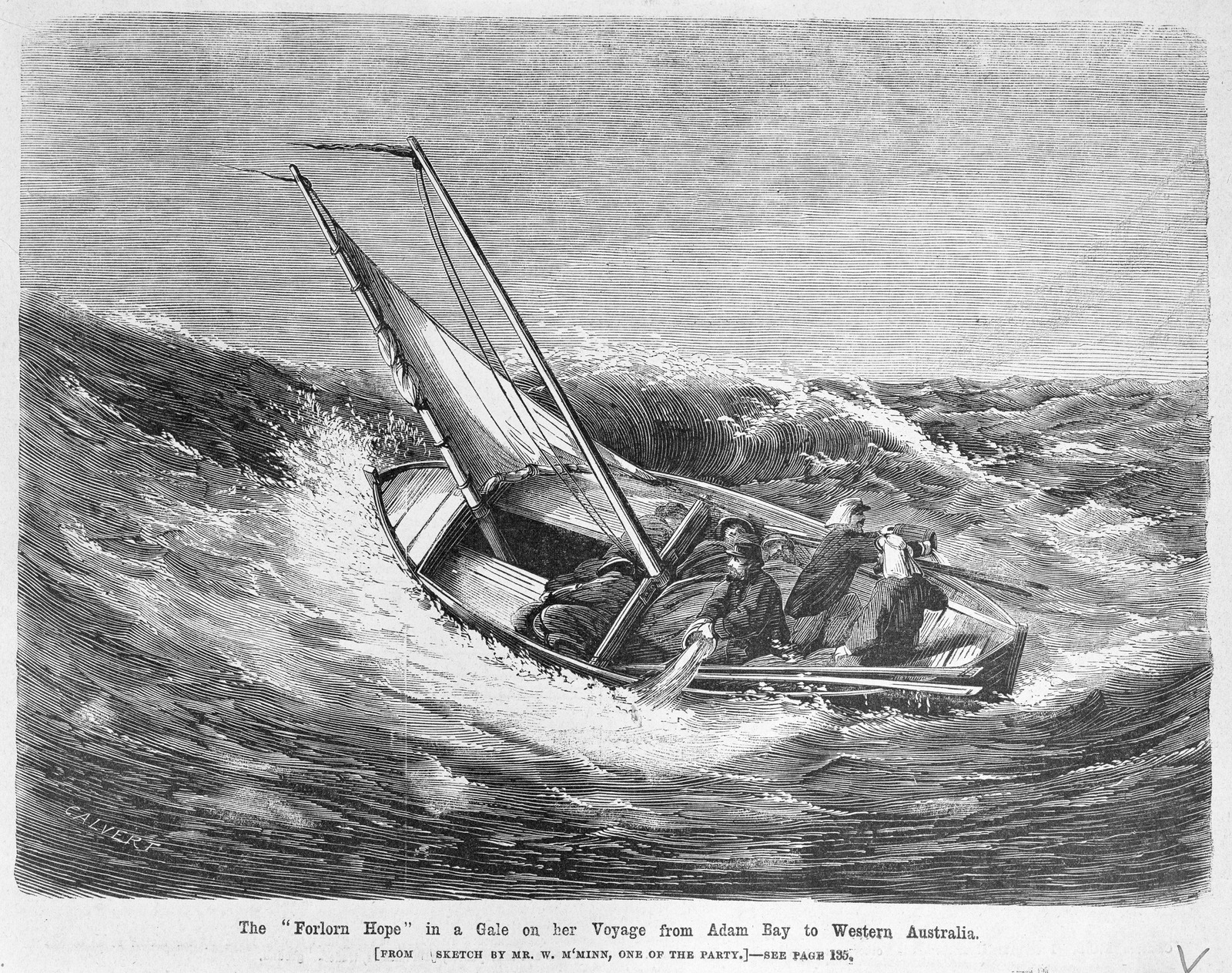
Forlorn Hope in heavy seas

Against this background, three men, Jefferson P. Stow JP, who had come to Adam Bay privately as an agent for land purchasers, and surveyors Arthur R. Hamilton and William McMinn had a bold plan: to purchase a vessel and sail it round to the Camden Harbour settlement in Western Australia, where they might encounter a ship bound for Fremantle, or at least replenish their provision for the journey to the next settlement. While in the Northern Territory they would explore any points of interest.

They recruited four other men to their crew: sailors John White and James Davis, and labourers Francis Edwards and Charles Hake. Hake had worked under Hamilton and partnered him in some pioneering photography, most likely the earliest in the "Top End" of the Northern Territory. Their conditions of membership of the crew have not been found; it is likely that the three "officers" paid for the boat, but were the others promised anything for their contribution?

On 4 May they purchased for £61 15s (an outrageous price at the time) one of the boats from the barque Bengal, which was at Adam Bay 21 April to 8 May. She was an open boat, like a whaleboat, built in Sweden, 23.5 by 6 feet (7.2 by 1.8 m), with two masts, spritsails, to which the venturers added a jib. They also added lockers and some rudimentary weatherproofing. McMinn traced maps from Bengal and stowed two theodolites and several pocket-compasses. They would record their latitude each noon; as they were following the coast they could manage without longitude, the determination of which would require a chronometer. Their provisions included 200 lbs of bread and biscuit, some cheese, twenty 6-lb tins of beef, a few medical comforts, some cakes, and 70 gallons of water. They carried very little luggage, apart from a chest with Hamilton and Hake's photographic equipment. At some stage they dubbed her The Forlorn Hope, which stuck.

Their intention was to cruise around to the Western Australian coast, then make for Camden Harbour, the latest WA Government settlement, of which many good things had been heard, and where they might pick up a passage to Fremantle or Adelaide. Failing that, they could continue around the coast till they met up with a suitable vessel or reached the Swan River.

=== Adam Bay to Camden Harbour ===
On 6 May, which had been declared a holiday, they unfurled a banner, Finis coronat opus (the end crowns the work, an ironic jibe at Finniss, whose family sported that motto), set sail, to the cheers of those at the Cliffs, up the five miles or so of the Adelaide River to where many of their colleagues were working at "The Narrows", and stayed the night there, being given another rousing farewell in the morning as they made their way back downstream. That evening they passed the Vernon Islands, Port Darwin the following day, and anchored among reefs for the miserably cold and wet night of 9 May. They passed Cape Blaze (now Point Blaze) on 10 May, passed between the Peron Islands and the mainland and into Anson Bay on 12 May. They camped a few days at Anson Bay near Cliff Head, and made several explorations inland, but found nothing of interest to prospective settlers. On 17 May they camped at Hyland Bay between Cape Dombey and Cape Hay. They crossed Cambridge Gulf and rounded Cape Londonderry on 18 May and Cape Bougainville on 19 May. They picked their way through various reefs and islands, resulting in some damage to the boat's hull. With a storm coming in, they anchored at Troughton Island for the 21st. The rudder broke in a storm the next day, but they were able to anchor and make repairs, then on 22 May went out to sea for some clear sailing, a detour of 80 or 90 miles. They passed Cassini Island on 24 May, and on 27th passed Byam Martin Island, steering towards Camden Harbour. 28 May they were forced by contrary winds to anchor off Augustus Island. Their provisions had completely run out and attempts at fishing and shooting birds came to nothing. On the 29th they resorted to rowing to pass through the strait that should lead to Camden Harbour. To their delight they saw a boat, and met on-board Government Surveyor James Cowle (died in Tasmania 18 August 1887), who was surveying the harbour, but appeared dull and despondent. He explained: the settlement had been a failure, the sheep had died, the crops had failed, and the settlers were ready to leave. They proceeded to the W.A. Government's Camden Harbour settlement, finding the ground rocky and infertile, and both the horses, sheep and residents in poor physical shape. Stow, Hamilton and McMinn were received hospitably by the Government Resident Robert J. Sholl, and the men "had their needs attended to". While there, McMinn took tracings of Admiralty charts as far as Fremantle; they purchased a ship's compass from a settler, and the Resident had his mechanic fashion a heavier anchor for them.

=== Camden Harbour to Champion Bay ===
Camden Harbour to Champion Bay
note: Latitudes (east/west position) at sea have been estimated.

They left the Harbour on 3 June, passing the wrecked ship Calliance, which had been purchased by several of the settlers from Victoria, who were now salvaging the copper sheathing by burning the hull. The 3rd, 4th and 5th were easy sailing. They passed Cafarelli Island (part of the Buccaneer Archipelago) on the 6th On the 8th ironwork of rudder broke; lowered sails and rode out the storm. Mountainous seas until midday 9 June, and they were able to set sail again, however a gale rose and Forlorn Hope shipped some heavy seas, the boat sunk low in the water and the men, bitterly cold and wet to the skin, had to bail for their lives. One of their number was sick and incapacitated; they could not cook; they could do no nothing for him but feed him rum and ginger. The others were exhausted and suffering cramps and rheumatic pains. The violent seas continued; on the night of 11 June they cut down the mainmast and let it float away. By 13 June the worst of the storm was over, and they sailed roughly WSW for three days, often in sight of land and smoke almost always being visible on the horizon. On 17 June they made for Turtle Island, hoping for some fresh food such as pelicans' eggs, but were frustrated by its rocky coastline. A row boat would have got them inshore, but they dared not risk Forlorn Hope. This appears to be the same Turtle Island as explorers C. C. Hunt and J. B. Ridley visited on the cutter Mystery 23 April 1863. They went ashore at Nickol Bay, found traces of earlier colonial visitors but no settlers. Further round they struck up with a friendly family of Aborigines, who after being given the traditional gifts of knives and tobacco, took them to a source of fresh water, where they were able to refill the casks. Food was running short though, with nothing left but flour and some rather poor rice. On 23 June they resumed sailing, but got caught in a current that dragged Forlorn Hope through a narrow strait which brought them to a vast area of reefs and islands. There was no alternative but to return in the direction they had come, chiefly by rowing, at the cost of a day's sailing. They anchored for the night between Legendre and Delambre Islands. Good sailing weather meant they could put "dreary" Nickol Bay behind them. It is possible they had missed the Roebourne settlement and Tien Tsin Harbour, both being established around that time. Fine weather and favourable if variable winds for a week or more meant significant progress, keeping five or eight miles from the shore. On 3 July they came across a shoal of schnapper, and caught enough for several days' good eating. On 5 July they passed Dirk Hartog Island on the outside having been misled by their chart to believe there was no passage between the island and mainland, then continued hugging the coast without significant problems, and on 8 July reached Champion Bay, and the town of Geraldton where they were instant celebrities, no news of their leaving the Northern Territory or their subsequent travails having reached any port in Australia. The crew was disbanded. Geraldton was by 1865 a sizeable settlement, with two hotels: the Geraldton (Baston's), where they were received most hospitably, and Ridley's Inn, where some of the crew took up residence. There was a small church, but no pastor, and a massive stone store, Crowther's.

=== Return to Adelaide ===
Five of the Forlorn Hope expeditioners left Champion Bay by the timber barge Sea Bird on the morning of 16 July. Hamilton and Hake remained, to take more photographs. The others arrived at Fremantle on 20 July and took the steamer up the Swan to Perth, where they were again the subject of much interest, as were their reports of the Adam Bay and Champion Bay settlements. 26 July they took the mailcart to King George Sound, arriving at Albany around 1 August; stayed there a week, and on 6 August at least three of the party (Stow, McMinn and White) boarded the steamer Rangatira for Port Adelaide, arriving 11 August 1865.

== Postscript ==
- Jefferson Pickman Stow (1830 – 4 May 1908) was a son of pioneering Congregational minister T. Q. Stow. He joined The Advertiser staff in 1865 was appointed editor in 1876. In 1884 he was appointed Stipendiary Magistrate at Port Pirie. In 1894 he published a longer account of the voyage, dedicated to his "dear comrades Arthur Hamilton and William McMinn".
- Arthur Richard Hamilton ( – c. 17 March 1886) Arrived South Australia 1853 aboard Eliza. In March 1866 gave damning evidence against Finniss. Worked as licensed surveyor and architect, but indications are that he did not prosper. Died at Adelaide Hospital. He and Charles Hake took some of the earliest known photographs of the Northern Territory, though few have been published and none is freely available for reproduction.
- William McMinn (1844–1884) Overseer of northern section of Overland Telegraph, controversially cancelled Darwent & Dalwood's contract and was sacked. As architect responsible for some of Adelaide's notable public buildings and grand residences. He drew the sketch of Forlorn Hope which, engraved by Calvert, is reproduced above.
- John White (–), the only member of the party (apart from McMinn) who got more than a passing mention in Stow's recollections, found worked pulling snags from the River Murray.
  The gallant John White has found a more liberal diet, safer sailing, surer anchorage, and less liability of being blown from shore, with the Murray snagboat.
- James Davis (–) a "British Tar" left Adelaide as second mate of a ship sailing to New Zealand.
- Francis Edwards (–) settled in the Barossa Valley
- Charles Hake (died 19 December 1896) joined the South Australian Telegraph Department and worked for that department in Darwin. He died at the Adelaide Hospital. With Hamilton, responsible for earliest Northern Territory photographs.
- Forlorn Hope spent a little time at Champion Bay, and was capsized in Fremantle by the captain of a merchant vessel, then found her way to South Australia where some young men sailed her from Port Adelaide to Victor Harbor.
