= List of non-English-language newspapers in Western Australia =

This is a list of newspapers published in Western Australia in languages other than English.

| Language | Title | Dates | Location | Notes |
|---|---|---|---|---|
| Japanese & English | Japanese Perth Times | 1989-1996 | Subiaco | Provided mainly travel and tourist information. |
| Vietnamese | Pho Thong News | 1993-1999 | Perth | Distributed mainly through the Vietnamese Society and Vietnamese shops and organisations. |
| Chinese & English | The Epoch Times, Perth | 2010- | Perth | Weekly publication, Perth branch of Epoch Media Group |
| Chinese | WA Chinese Periodical | 1995-1998 | Perth | |
| Italian | Il Canguro (The Kangaroo) | 1955-1957 | Perth | Weekly publication, dealt mainly with sport. |
| Italian | Eco Italiano: Italian Language Newspaper | 1959 (only a few months) | Perth | |
| Spanish & English | El Corresponsal (The Correspondent) | 1992 (only a few months) | | |
| Polish | Echo: Polski Tygodnik Niezalezny | 1950-1952 | Perth | |
| Greek | Hellenic Echo | 1967-1968 (only a few months) | Perth | |
| Indonesian | Indonesia Post Perth | 1995-1997 | Perth | Also included the Indonesian Business Review. |
| Italian | Ancol comunità : rivista mensile di attualita dell'Australia Occidentale | 1984-1985? | North Perth | |
| Chinese & English | Ya Zhou shi dai (Asia Times) | 2006-2008 | South Perth | |
| Chinese & English | Australia Asia Business Weekly | 2008- | Northbridge | |
| Chinese | Australia China Business review | 1995 | East Perth | |
| Chinese | Australian Chinese Times | 1995- | Perth | |
| Italian & English | Comunità di lavoro d'Australia | 1982 - 1983 | North Perth | |
| Arabic & English | Crescent Times: Australian Muslim newspaper | 2008-2011 | Mirrabooka | |
| German | Der Australische Spiegel (The Australian Mirror) | 1952 | Perth | |
| Greek & English | Hellenism | 1971-1980 | Perth | |
| Italian & English | La Rondine | 1969-1994? | Perth | |
| Italian | La Stampa Italiana (The Italian Press) | 1931-1932 | Perth | |
| Macedonian & English | Makedonski Opstinski Vesnik (Macedonian Community News) | 1975 - 1976 | North Perth | |
| Chinese & English | Oriental Post | 2001-2009 | Leederville | |
| Chinese & English | Oriental Weekly | 2010- | Northbridge | |
| Croatian & English | Sloga (Unity) | 1950-1967 | Perth | |
| Macedonian & English | Vesnik | 1976-1994 | North Perth | |
| Arabic & English | Voice of Islam | 1984 - 1996? | Booragoon | |
| Chinese | WA Chinese Press | 1999? | Perth | |
| Chinese | WA Chinese Times | 1995 | West Perth | |
| Italian & English | Western Australian Italian Club News | 1975-1976 | Perth | |
