= List of shipwrecks in 1867 =

The list of shipwrecks in 1867 includes ships sunk, foundered, grounded, or otherwise lost during 1867.

table of contents
1867
Jan	Feb	Mar	Apr
May	Jun	Jul	Aug
Sep	Oct	Nov	Dec
Unknown date

== Unknown date ==
List of shipwrecks: Unknown date 1867
Ship	State	Description
Antelope	United States	The passenger-cargo steamer burned at Buffalo, New York. She was rebuilt and returned to service.
Carlotta	Flag unknown	The schooner was lost in the vicinity of "Squan", a term used at the time for the coast of New Jersey near Manasquan and sometimes for the 7-mile (11 km) stretch of coast between Manasquan Inlet and Cranberry Inlet or for the entire coast of New Jersey between Sea Girt and Barnegat Inlet.
Charles E. Pope	Flag unknown	The schooner was lost in the vicinity of "Squan Beach", a term used at the time for the coast of New Jersey near Manasquan and sometimes for the 7-mile (11 km) stretch of coast between Manasquan Inlet and Cranberry Inlet or for the entire coast of New Jersey between Sea Girt and Barnegat Inlet.
Ciudad Condal	Spain	The steamship sank on 12 July or 12 August. All on board survived. She was on a voyage from Havana, Cuba to Sisal, Mexico.
Cordula	Flag unknown	The full-rigged ship was lost in the vicinity of "Squan Beach", a term used at the time for the coast of New Jersey near Manasquan and sometimes for the 7-mile (11 km) stretch of coast between Manasquan Inlet and Cranberry Inlet or for the entire coast of New Jersey between Sea Girt and Barnegat Inlet.
HMS Doterel	Royal Navy	The Britomart-class gunboat ran aground four times between 26 June and 19 September.
Eliza	Flag unknown	The coal hulk was wrecked in the Isles of Scilly. Her figurehead is in the Tresco Abbey Gardens on Tresco.
General McNeil	Flag unknown	The sternwheel paddle steamer struck a snag and sank in the Missouri River at Howards Bend near St. Louis, Missouri, sometime during the 1860s.
G. W. Hinson	Flag unknown	The schooner was lost in the vicinity of "Squan Beach", a term used at the time for the coast of New Jersey near Manasquan and sometimes for the 7-mile (11 km) stretch of coast between Manasquan Inlet and Cranberry Inlet or for the entire coast of New Jersey between Sea Girt and Barnegat Inlet.
Hawkhead	(United Kingdom of Great Britain and Ireland) New Zealand	Wreckage from the schooner was discovered off the east coast of New Zealand's South Island in June 1867, several months after the vessel was reported missing.
HMS Investigator	Royal Navy	The survey ship ran aground in the River Niger. She came under cannon fire from the local inhabitants, with two of her crew killed. She was refloated after 11 days and taken in to Lagos in a severely damaged condition.
John Williams	United Kingdom	The ship was wrecked off Niue, in the Pacific Ocean before 1 April. Her crew survived.
O.K.	United States	The 48- or 75-ton sidewheel paddle steamer was lost in either 1867 or 1881.
Phoenix	(United Kingdom of Great Britain and Ireland) New Zealand	The schooner left Okarito for Dunedin on 13 May, and was not seen again.
Platt Valley	United States	The sidewheel paddle steamer sank in the Mississippi River near the Arkansas shoreline across from Memphis, Tennessee, after striking the wreck of the sidewheel ram CSS General Beauregard (Confederate States Navy).
Shooting Star	Siam	The clipper was wrecked off the coast of Formosa.
Thomas Bazley	United Kingdom	The steamship ran aground in the River Niger at Lokoja. She was refloated after 14 days.
Village Belle	(United Kingdom of Great Britain and Ireland) New Zealand	The brigantine left Bluff Harbour in late April en route for Newcastle, New South Wales. She sat out a storm in Foveaux Strait for several weeks, but was not seen again after that.
