= The Inquirer & Commercial News =

Former newspaper in Perth, Western Australia

- Type: Weekly newspaper
- Owner(s): Edmund Stirling, Robert John Sholl
- Founded: 4 July 1855
- Headquarters: St Georges Terrace, Perth

The Inquirer & Commercial News was a newspaper published in Perth, Western Australia from 1855 to 1901.

In May 1847, Edmund Stirling acquired The Inquirer from Francis Lochée, who established the paper in August 1840 together with William Tanner. Tanner disposed of his interest in the paper in June 1843. In July 1855, The Inquirer merged with The Commercial News and Shipping Gazette, which was owned by Robert John Sholl, to form The Inquirer & Commercial News, in the joint ownership of Sholl and Stirling. Stirling's eldest son John joined the paper around 1863 and operated the paper with his father when Sholl left. In 1878, Stirling's three other sons Horace, Frederick and Baldwin joined the paper, trading as Stirling & Sons. When Stirling retired, his three sons took control of the paper as Stirling Bros. On 6 July 1886, it incorporated the Morning Herald. On 17 February 1893, the paper changed format and became the Inquirer and Commercial News Illustrated until 28 December 1894, when it reverted to The Inquirer & Commercial News. In the 1880s, the Daily News traced its history to the establishment of The Inquirer. In July 1882, The Stirling brothers launched the Daily News and in June 1901, the paper was incorporated into the Daily News.

== Publishing details ==
Its publication history is complex:

The publisher varies:

- Stirling, Sholl and Company to 10 January 1866;
- Stirling and Son from 17 January 1866 – 27 March 1878;
- Stirling Bros. 3 April 1878 – 26 July 1882;
- Baldwin King Stirling from 2 August 1882 – 6 September 1882;
- Baldwin King Stirling for the proprietors Stirling Bros. from 13 September 1882 – 4 February 1891;
- Horace George Stirling for Stirling Bros and Co. Limited from 6 February 1891 – 28 December 1894;
- William Patrick Keeley for Stirling Bros. and Co. Limited from 4 January 1895 – 10 January 1896;
- Robert Philip Mansfield for Stirling Bros. and Co. Limited from 17 January 1896 – 1 January 1897;
- James Spargo Nicholls for Stirling Bros. and Co. Limited from 8 January 1897 – 18 February 1898;
- Robert Philip Mansfield for Stirling Bros. and Co. Limited from 25 February 1898 – 29 June 1900;
- Archibald Davidson for Stirling Bros. and Co. Limited from 2 July 1900 – 28 June 1901.

Journal Dates: Vol. 15, no. 773, new series, no. 1 (4 July 1855)-v. 61, no. 3349 (28 June 1901)

It was weekly on Wednesday until 21 March 1888; twice weekly on Wednesday and Friday from 23 March 1888 – 10 February 1892; twice weekly on Wednesday and Saturday from 13 February 1893 – 11 February 1893; weekly on Friday from 17 February 1893.
