= Fremantle Journal and General Advertiser =

Former newspaper in Western Australia

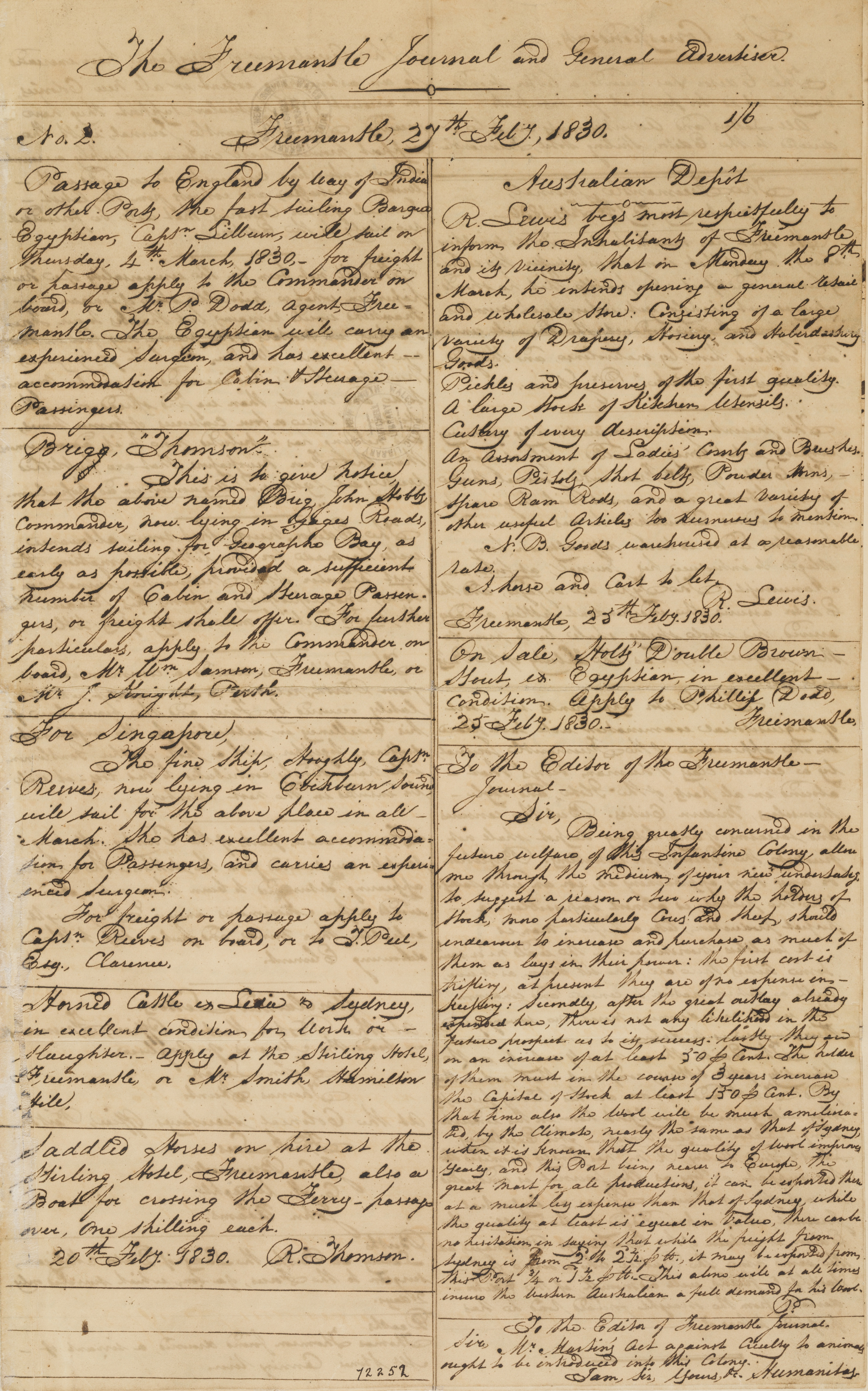
Handwritten front page of a copy issued 27 February 1830

The Fremantle Journal and General Advertiser was the first newspaper published in Western Australia. It was edited and published by James A. Gardner, with the first issues appearing less than a year after the establishment of the Swan River Colony in 1829. As there was not yet a printing press in the colony, each issue was handwritten.

Copies are Rare. The State Library of New South Wales holds issues February–March 1830. A single sheet, copy number 5 of the first issue, for 27 February 1830, is held by the Battye Library in Perth, Western Australia. It is printed on both sides and folded in half thus yielding four pages; it sold for one shilling and sixpence. It is not known when publication ceased, except that it had certainly concluded by the time Gardner left the colony in September that year. In addition, three issues survive of a manuscript newspaper published by Gardner under the title Western Australia Gazette and General Advertiser. It is unknown whether this is a different newspaper or the same newspaper under a new name. The three extant issues have been digitised and are held by the State Library of New South Wales, and are dated 4 April 1830, 1 June 1830 and 13 June 1830. They are larger, and sold for three shillings and sixpence.

The publication of the Fremantle Journal and General Advertiser was widely recognised as an important, albeit modest, step in the progress of the colony. The Sydney Gazette published a number of extracts from it, prefacing them with the comment

"It is interesting to witness the first dawn of literature upon yonder savage shores, and, though faint and feeble, we trust it will continue to brighten and to spread, until the light of science and morals be diffused over the whole surface of Western Australia."

It was even noticed by The Mirror of Literature, Amusement, and Instruction, a London anthology.
