= Edward Scott (sportsman) =

English sportsman

E.K. Scott
- Born: Edward Keith Scott; 14 June 1918 Truro, Cornwall, England
- Died: 3 June 1995 (aged 76) Truro
- School: Clifton College
- University: Lincoln College, Oxford; St Mary's Hospital Medical School

Rugby union career
- Position: Centre
Senior career
Years	Team	Apps	(Points)
–	Oxford University		
–	St Mary's Hospital RFC		
International career
Years	Team	Apps	(Points)
1947-1948	England	5	(0)

Edward Keith Scott (14 June 1918 – 3 June 1995) was an English sportsman who played first-class cricket and represented the England national rugby union team.

== Early life ==
Keith Scott was born in Truro, Cornwall and attended Clifton College, near to Clifton where his grandfather the politician Edward Scott had settled on returning to England from Australia to practise medicine. Scott's father, Frank Sholl Scott, practised medicine in Cornwall, just as Scott's grandfather had done. Thus it was that Edward Keith Scott followed in this tradition and after attending Clifton went on to Lincoln College, Oxford, to read medicine and then continued his training at St Mary's Hospital, London.

== Rugby career ==
Scott played rugby at Clifton RFC and went on to represent both Oxford University and St Mary's Hospital RFC, both leading rugby sides of that time. In 1947 he returned to Cornwall and joined Redruth RFC. His father, Frank Sholl Scott, had represented England at rugby union in 1907 and Edward was to follow in his father's footsteps. He was first capped during the 1947 Five Nations Championship, in a win over Wales. A year later he made his captaincy debut when he led England in a Test against Australia at Twickenham, which the tourists won the 11 points. The Cornish centre got another three caps in the 1948 Five Nations but lost the two which he captained.

== Cricket career ==
Scott, a leg-break bowler, took 12 wickets at 37.00 in his nine first-class matches. He was in the Clifton College XI for 5 years from 1933 to 1937 and took 244 wickets, a record that still stands today. He played Minor Counties cricket for Cornwall from 1936 to 1954. He appeared a couple of times in first-class matches for Gloucestershire in 1937 but had only one scalp to show for it, the Worcestershire batsman Sidney Martin being out hit wicket. Scott then played five matches with Oxford University in 1938, taking eight wickets. He made two further first-class cricket appearances once his international rugby career was over: his efforts at Cornwall got him selected in a match for the Minor Counties in 1949 and he also played for the Marylebone Cricket Club against Canada in 1951.
