= Robert Frederick Sholl =

Australian politician

Robert Sholl
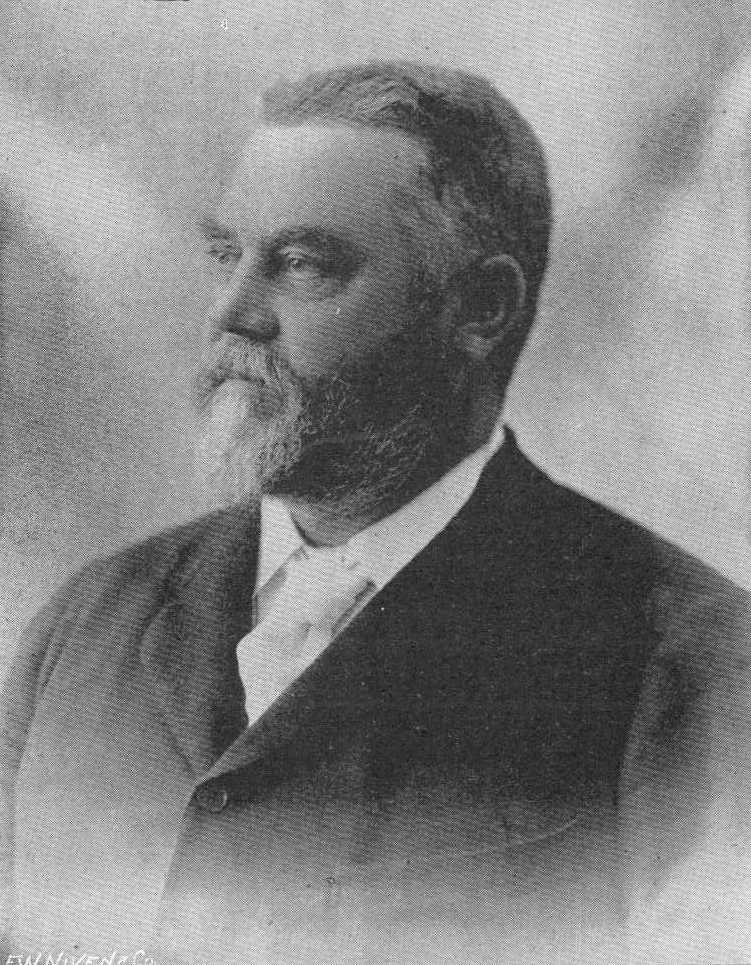

Member of the Legislative Council of Western Australia for North Province
- In office 22 May 1904 – 8 December 1909

Member of the Legislative Assembly of Western Australia for Gascoyne
- In office 27 November 1890 – 28 April 1897
- Preceded by: Electoral district created
- Succeeded by: George Hubble

Member of the Legislative Council of Western Australia for Gascoyne
- In office 20 May 1886 – 21 October 1890
- Preceded by: Maitland Brown
- Succeeded by: Electoral district abolished

Personal details
- Born: Robert Frederick Sholl; 27 August 1848
- Died: 4 December 1909 (aged 61); Perth, Western Australia, Australia
- Resting place: Karrakatta Cemetery
- Parents: Robert John Sholl (father); Mary Ann Berckelman (mother)
- Relatives: Trevarton Charles Sholl (brother); Richard Adolphus Sholl (brother); Horatio William Sholl (brother)

Robert Frederick Sholl (27 August 1848 – 4 December 1909) was an entrepreneur and a member of the Parliament of Western Australia. His business interests included pearling vessels, real estate and mining. Sholl was also a representative at the Australasian Federal Convention of 1897.

He was the son of Government Resident Robert John Sholl (1819–86) and Mary Ann Sholl née Berckelman (1822–89). Three brothers of Robert Frederick Sholl were also notable: Trevarton Sholl (1845–1867), Richard Adolphus Sholl (1847–1919) and Horatio William (Horace) Sholl (1852–1927).

== Bibliography ==
Bolton, GC, "Sholl, Robert Frederick (1848–1909)", Australian Dictionary of Biography [online ed.] (25 September 2012).
