= The Inquirer (Perth) =

Former newspaper in Perth, Western Australia

- Type: Weekly newspaper (every Wednesday)
- Format: Manuscript
- Owner(s): Francis Lochée, William Tanner
- Editor: Francis Lochée
- Founded: 5 August 1840
- ISSN: 1838-9767

The Inquirer was a newspaper published in Perth, Western Australia between 5 August 1840 and 27 June 1855, by Francis Lochée. It was a competitor to the Perth Gazette.

The Inquirer was established by Francis Lochée and William Tanner, with the first issue published on 5 August 1840. Lochée became sole proprietor and editor in June 1843, when Tanner, dissatisfied with its progress, withdrew his support. Lochée retained ownership of the paper until he gained employment with the Western Australian Bank, and sold it to Perth lawyer and journalist Richard West Nash, who also acted as editor, publisher and printer.

In November 1846 Nash was appointed Acting Advocate General, with the stipulation (by Acting Governor F. C. Irwin and Acting Colonial Secretary George Fletcher Moore) that he dissociate himself from the Inquirer, a longtime critic of the Government. He passed control of the paper to its compositor Edmund Stirling, but for the time being retained ownership. Then in May 1847 he sold the operation to Stirling.

Robert John Sholl was editor of The Inquirer from 1849, then left to establish in February 1855, with financial support from George Walpole Leake, a new weekly, The Commercial News and Shipping Gazette. In July 1855 The Inquirer merged with The Commercial News and Shipping Gazette to form The Inquirer & Commercial News, which was published between 1855 and 1901.
