= Examiner Newspapers =

Australian newspaper group

Examiner Newspapers is a newspaper group in Perth, Western Australia. Founded in 1989, it is owned by Gerald van Rongen. In July 2025, printing of its newspapers moved from Seven West Media to Post Newspapers.

== Publications ==
- Armadale Examiner
- Canning Examiner
- Gosnells Examiner
- Serpentine-Jarrahdale Examiner.
