= Nickol Bay =

Bay in Western Australia

Coordinates: 20°36′S 116°54′E

Nickol Bay is a bay between the Burrup Peninsula and Dixon Island, on the Pilbara coast in Western Australia.

Once alternatively spelled "Nicol Bay", it was named by John Septimus Roe for a sailor who was lost overboard during an expedition.

F. T. Gregory visited the bay a number of times in 1861.

When the tiny Forlorn Hope sailed around the Bay in June 1865, they landed several times but found no signs of European habitation, yet two years later a settlement named Roebourne had been established and the district's virtues for rearing sheep were being extolled widely.
