= Post Newspapers =

- Type: Weekly newspaper
- Format: Tabloid
- Owner: Bret Christian
- Founded: 1977
- Language: English
- Headquarters: Shenton Park, Western Australia
- Country: Australia
- Circulation: 52,250
- Website: postnewspapers.com.au

Post Newspapers comprises the four editions of a community newspaper covering a group of western suburbs in Perth, Western Australia.

== History ==
The Post Newspapers group was established as the Subiaco Post by reporter Bret Christian and his wife Bettye in September 1977 at a house in Churchill Avenue, Subiaco. The first edition was published in September 1977. The paper moved to a former wine saloon in Keightley Road, Subiaco, in 1979, and moved again to Onslow Road in Shenton Park in 2006.

The Post started as a monthly, became fortnightly in 1978 and went to weekly publication from 26 November 1980.

While continuing to publish the Subiaco Post, the Post Newspapers developed other suburban editions: Nedlands Post in April 1978, Claremont Post in July 1978, Cottesloe Post in August 1979, Mosman Park Post in November 1980 (the Cottesloe and Mosman Park edition were combined at that time), and the Cambridge Post (formerly Floreat) in October 1981. All four are still published.

The Post's distribution area reaches as far south as North Fremantle, as far north as Wembley Downs and Woodlands, and as far east as West Perth and West Leederville.

The Post's Time Out section has arts coverage; reviews of films, books and restaurants; and an agony aunt column by Wayne and Tamara Mitchell.

The page 4 Listening Post feature first appeared in 1989: the column includes gossipy or curious items.

A semi-regular feature is photographs of people reading the paper at well-known tourist destinations or places of historic note. The first was published in 1993, when a Nedlands resident was photographed with the Post at the top of Mount Kilimanjaro, in Tanzania. Other residents have posed with the paper at the Giza pyramids in Egypt, in front of Table Mountain in South Africa and underwater at the Great Barrier Reef.

In 2025, Post Newspapers purchased its own printing press to break the monopoly Seven West Media held. Post Newspapers took over printing of Examiner Newspapers publications from Seven West Media on 1 July 2025. In 2026, Post Newspapers launched 'North Coast POST', a new paper for Perth's northern coastal suburbs.
