= Robert John Sholl =

British colonial settler in Western Australia

Robert John Sholl JP
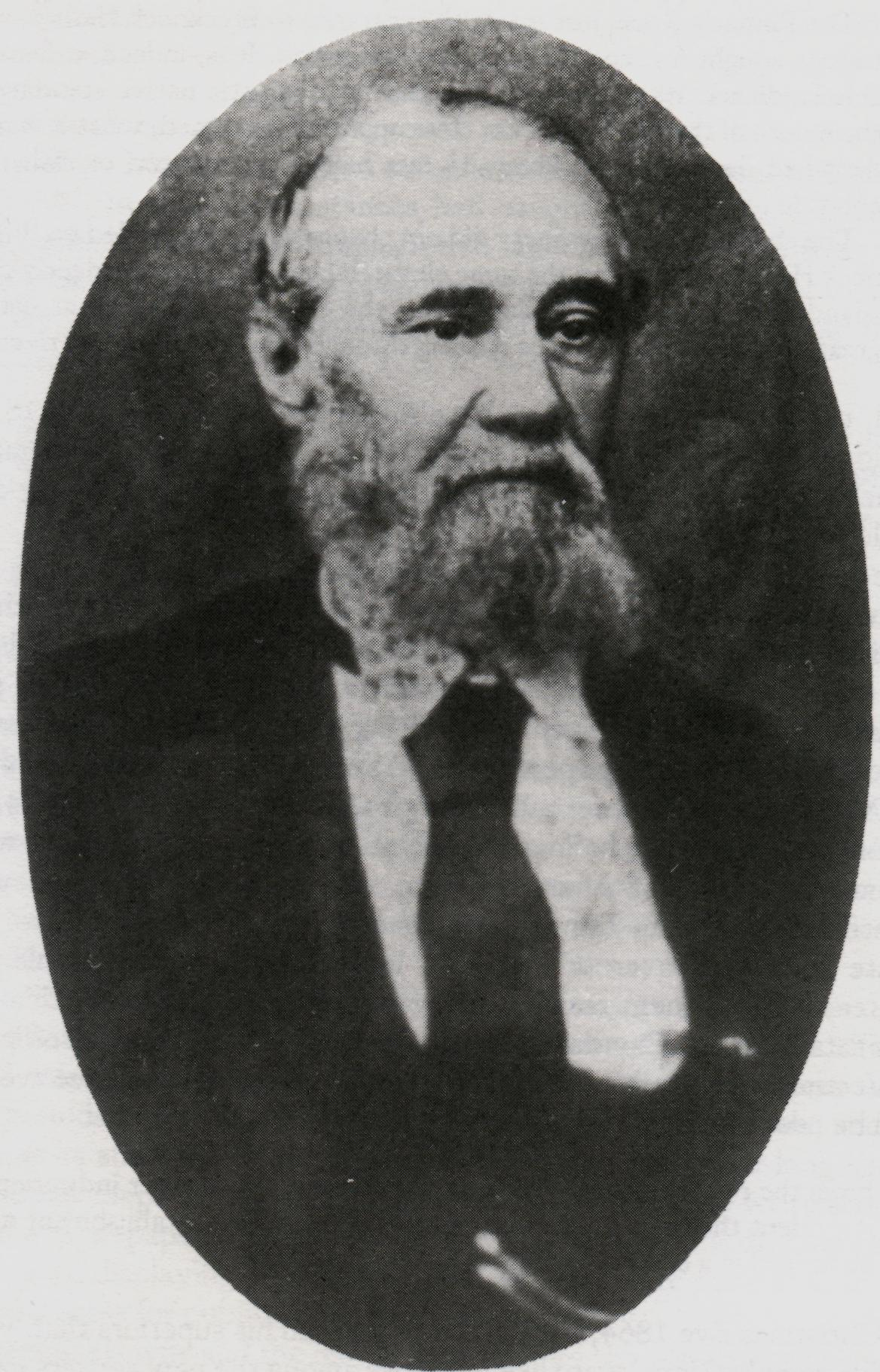
- Robert John Sholl, c. 1880

Government Resident, North District, (a. k. a.) Resident Magistrate, Roebourne
- In office 1865–1881
- Succeeded by: E. H. Laurence

Personal details
- Born: 16 July 1819 London
- Died: 19 June 1886 (aged 66) Perth, Western Australia
- Resting place: East Perth Cemetery
- Spouse: Mary Ann Berckelman

Robert John Sholl (16 July 1819 – 19 June 1886) was a government administrator, magistrate, explorer, journalist, entrepreneur, harbourmaster, customs official, postmaster and lay reader in Western Australia (WA), during the colonial era. Because of his multiple, simultaneous roles, which carried judicial, political, cultural and commercial power and influence, Sholl is regarded as a significant figure in the history of North-West Australia, at an early stage of its settlement by Europeans.

Between 1865 and 1881, Sholl was the most senior government official and only judicial officer in North West Australia between the Murchison River and Timor Sea – a jurisdiction known at the time as the North District. His headquarters at Roebourne was extremely isolated – messages took weeks to travel between Sholl and his immediate superior, Frederick Barlee, Colonial Secretary of Western Australia. Consequently, Sholl wielded considerable, de facto executive power; an obituary in The West Australian described him as having been "virtually a Lieutenant Governor" of the North District.

== Family and early life ==
The Sholl family originated in Cornwall and had strong ties to maritime industries, the armed forces, international trade, public office and medicine, in both England and Australia.

William Sholl (1736–1797), R. J. Sholl's paternal grandfather, was a Freeman (shareholder) of the Levant Company, represented it at İskenderun (Alexandretta) in Turkey and was vice consul of both the UK and the Netherlands in that city; He married Maria Teresa Sholl, née Justa (1761?—1833) at Aleppo in 1778.

Several members of the family had careers connected to the Royal Navy (RN) or British Army during the 19th century:

- Robert Sholl senior (c. 1781–1832), the father of R. J. Sholl, was an official Naval Agent, contracted to supply ships of the RN;
- Richard Sholl (1786–1836), an uncle of R. J. Sholl, was a naval officer and Purser on HMS Sulphur, when it was part of the 1829 expedition to establish the Swan River Colony – he later acquired property there;
- Vice Admiral Sir John Kingcome KCB (1794–1871) was an uncle by marriage;
- Dr William Horatio Sholl MRCSE (1808–76), R. J. Sholl's older brother, was a military surgeon with the British Auxiliary Legion in Spain, during the First Carlist War and;
- Colonel Edward Corbett MP (1817–95), an officer in the British Army and later a member of the House of Commons was R. J. Sholl's brother-in-law.

Robert John Sholl, born on 16 July 1819 in London, was the third of six children of Elizabeth Sholl (née Motton; c. 1782–18??) and Robert Sholl senior. R. J. Sholl was the second oldest sibling (and second oldest son) to survive into adulthood.

Dr William Horatio Sholl emigrated to Western Australia in 1839, after inheriting property from their uncle Richard. Dr Sholl attempted, without success, to be appointed Colonial Surgeon – the most senior medical position in WA. After becoming editor of Perth newspaper The Inquirer, W. H. Sholl used that position for outspoken criticism of some government officials. He later moved to South Australia, where he became a prominent medical practitioner.

In 1844, R. J. Sholl married Mary Ann Berckelman (1822–1889) – who had been born in Ireland – at the Anglican Church in Picton, WA. The couple were to have eight children, and several of their sons became prominent in government and business circles:

- Trevarton Sholl (1845–1867 – see below);
- Richard Adolphus Sholl (1847–1919), Postmaster General of WA (1889–1900);
- Robert Frederick Sholl (1848–1909), MLC/MLA, pearler, investor in real estate and mining, representative at the Australasian Federal Convention of 1897, and;
- Horatio William (Horace) Sholl (1852–1927), MLC/MLA, pastoralist, pearler and mining proprietor.

== Early career ==
In 1840, Elizabeth Sholl (a widow), followed her oldest son William to Western Australia, along with three of her other children, including R. J. Sholl – who abandoned his own medical studies. The family arrived in WA on the ship Shepherd on 19 November 1840 and settled in the South West soon afterwards. R. J. Sholl appears to have worked initially as a teacher or private tutor in the Busselton area.

Sholl joined an exploration party led by Vernon Bussell and George Warburton, in January 1842 – along with four soldiers and four Aboriginal guides – seeking to pioneer a cart route between the Bunbury-Vasse area and a proposed road from Perth to King George Sound. They explored the sparsely populated, hilly area between Busselton and the middle Blackwood River before returning to the coast near Bunbury. Although no feasible route was found, Sholl wrote an account of the trip for a newspaper and acquired a reputation as an explorer.

In mid-1842, Sholl was one of 24 signatories to an open letter to brothers Alfred and Charles Bussell, thanking them "for the liberal, spirited, and persevering manner with which you have constantly met the aggression of the natives upon the lives and property of the settlers". This followed the trial of Charles Bussell for the manslaughter of a seven-year-old Aboriginal girl; Bussell was discharged with a fine of one shilling.

During the mid-1840s, R. J. Sholl was appointed to a series of government positions in Bunbury. In 1844, he became a tidewaiter (customs official) and clerk to the District Magistrate's Court. During 1847, he was made sub-registrar of births, deaths and marriages, as well as Bunbury's postmaster. He also became involved in private businesses, such as fattening beef cattle.

In 1849, Sholl succeeded his brother William as editor of Perth newspaper The Inquirer, which was owned by Edmund Stirling. The following year R. J. Sholl was appointed secretary of the Geraldine Mining Company, formed to operate the first commercial mine in WA: a lead and copper mining lease in the riverbed, banks and near to the Murchison River. Sholl resigned from The Inquirer in early 1855, and with financial support from George Leake, established a new weekly, The Commercial News and Shipping Gazette, from offices in Fremantle. After 20 issues, The Commercial News was merged with The Inquirer and Sholl became a part-owner and editor of the new title, The Inquirer & Commercial News.

Like his brother before him, R. J. Sholl used editorials in The Inquirer to mount campaigns against officialdom. In particular, during 1861 he attacked the Colonial government, over an unpopular customs regulation. Inquirer articles singled out Governor Arthur Kennedy and called on the Imperial government to transfer Kennedy to another position. By contrast, Sholl and The Inquirer were very supportive of both Kennedy's assistant, Frederick Barlee (Colonial Secretary of Western Australia in 1855–75) and his successor as Governor, John Hampton. Sholl's personal and professional connections to Barlee was long-lived and included their joint involvement in private businesses.

== Career as Government Resident ==
I have endeavoured in the foregoing instructions to place you fully in possession of the views of His Excellency Governor Hampton upon the principal points of duty that will devolve upon you, but there are numerous details into which it is impossible I should enter, and which, at so great a distance from headquarters, can only be decided by yourself. You are to consider these instructions as for your general guidance; you are not bound to adhere to them in minute particulars, where circumstances may occur to justify a departure from them; but whenever you may decide on any departure from them, you will be careful to report the cases; and the reasons for such departure...

— F. P. Barlee, Colonial Secretary of Western Australia: "Instructions to the Government Resident of the North District", 20 January 1865.

The first settlers in the northern half of Western Australia – led by Perth entrepreneur Walter Padbury – disembarked on 8 May 1863 with sheep and other livestock at Tien Tsin Harbor [sic] (later known as Cossack), near the Harding River. Over the next few years, pastoralists applied for leases between the De Grey and Ashburton Rivers (in the region known later as the Pilbara). The population of pastoralists – which included some southern Aboriginal stock workers – remained small in number.

=== Camden Harbour ===
In 1864, plans for a settlement (and, potentially, a separate Colony) near the northern tip of WA, emerged in the form of the Camden Harbor [sic] Pastoral Association. The Camden Harbour venture consequently attracted a significant number of settlers, most of them from the Western District of Victoria. About 170 settlers sailed from Melbourne in November 1864. Upon their arrival in the north, it was immediately obvious to most settlers that the tropical climate was inimical to sheep and many settlers left immediately. At the beginning of 1865 – to forestall the possibility of any of its territory being excised – the WA Government appointed Sholl as Government Resident of the North District. In order to establish a permanent presence, the government sent Sholl to Camden Harbour, with a party of 46 government employees, including a surveying team under James Cowle, Pensioner Guards, police and labourers. His eldest son, Trevarton Sholl was included and served as customs officer, postmaster and clerk to his father.

In April, Sholl and a heavily armed exploration party attempted to locate a route from Camden Harbour to Roebuck Bay. They succeeded in crossing the Glenelg River, but did not travel much further. During this journey, Sholl named the McRae River after a young member of the expedition, Alexander McRae. Sholl's account of the expedition was later published in the Journal of the Royal Geographical Society (1866). In June, a party that included McRae and Trevarton Sholl (but not his father) attempted the same journey and also failed.

From 29 June to 3 May 1865 they were hosts to the crew of the "Forlorn Hope", escapees from the failed settlement at Escape Cliffs, Northern Territory, and were treated hospitably. They had hoped to pick up provisions or, better still, passage to Fremantle, but there was no relief ship expected for months, and what provisions could be spared were adequate for the next leg of their journey, but not over-generous.

The settlement was visited by Makassan mariners from Sulawesi (often referred to as "Malays"), in April 1865. Although Makassans had been travelling to northern Australia for centuries, Sholl wrote one of the first descriptions of them visiting Western Australia.

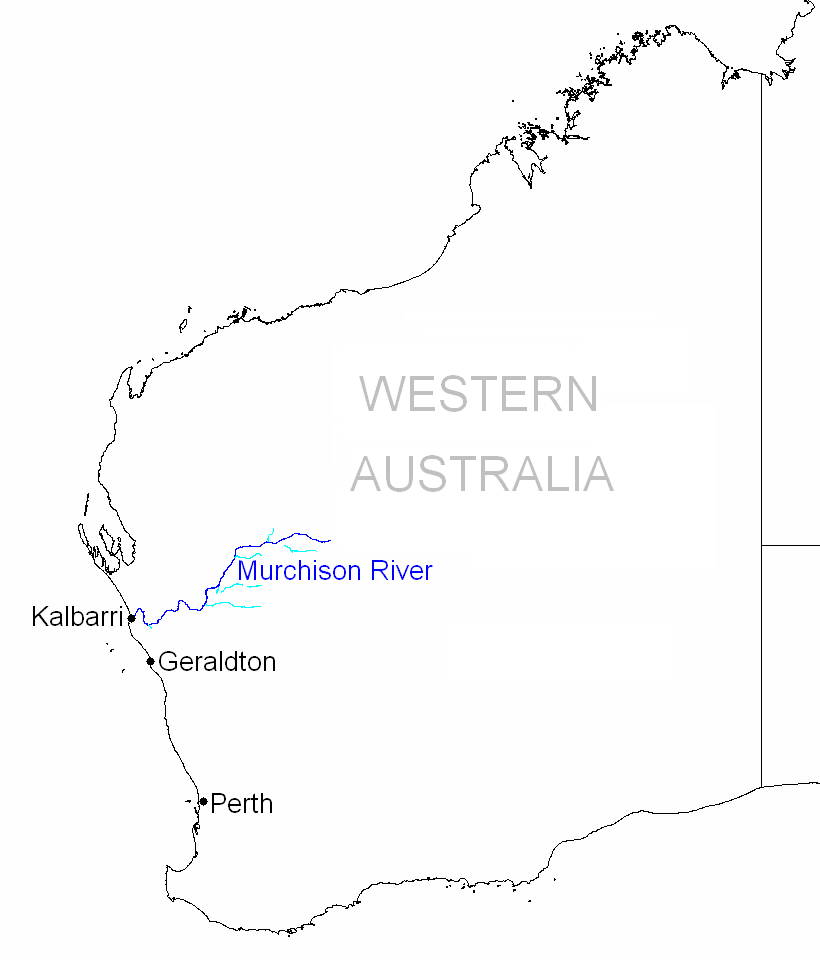
R. J. Sholl's jurisdiction, the North District, was the vast area defined by Land Regulations (1862) as north of a border that followed the Murchison River north west from the sea for approximately 100 miles, and then followed a line "through the summit of Mount Murchison" (approx. 26° 43' 51" South, 116° 25' 16" East), east to the Colonial border.

Sholl and the few remaining settlers were evacuated from Camden Harbour in October 1865. The Resident, with a significantly reduced staff, moved to Tien Tsin Harbor and set up a government camp near the homestead of Mount Welcome Station, a pastoral lease held by Emma and John Withnell. Sholl was accompanied by his son Trevarton and about 10 other government employees, most of them semi-skilled labourers, along with a few police and southern Aboriginal convicts, detached from the prison on Rottnest Island.

=== 1866–1869 ===
The Government Resident's duties were focused initially on organising surveying expeditions (which were led in the field by government surveyor Charles Wedge), exploration, land and livestock regulations and the construction of basic infrastructure; Sholl presided over few court cases, other than Master and Servant disputes, most of which involved government employees.

During the 1860s, the various indigenous peoples of the North West sought or were forced to seek employment with settlers in increasing numbers. In addition to woolgrowing, a significant pearling industry emerged around Nickol Bay, from boats usually based at Tien Tsin Harbor. Most pearling vessels employed local indigenous divers, for payment in staple foods and other commodities (e.g. tobacco). However, many Aboriginal people were dying as a result of newly introduced diseases, exacerbated by drought, famine and competition with settlers and their livestock, and; violence. In 1866, Sholl documented how the local Aboriginal population was decimated by smallpox (which is now believed to have been carried to Australia with Makassans). This led to competition amongst settlers to recruit and retain indigenous workers. In some cases, pearlers and pastoralists used coercion, and confinement, supported by the severe Master & Servant laws, to recruit, retain and discipline indigenous workers. As was this case in many parts of northern Australia, this evolved into a form of unfree labour, officially sanctioned and enforced by police, under which indigenous people became dependent upon "rations" (payment in kind; i.e. food and other goods and services) provided by their employers. While pastoralists attempted to retain employees on sheep stations, it is also alleged (conversely) that pearlers sometimes abandoned indigenous crew members far from their traditional lands.

Sholl developed close ties to some pastoral and pearling entrepreneurs, such as Charles Broadhurst. For instance, during 1866, Broadhurst served as acting Government Resident, while Sholl attended to personal business in Perth.

During 1866 and 1867, tensions between settlers and indigenous peoples increased, as they competed for scarce resources water and food resources. This emerged in various forms, such as the appropriation of livestock and staple foods like flour, and armed conflict. An increasing number of indigenous people were charged, with offences such as theft. They were usually sentenced to hard labour for the government or, in some cases, transportation to Rottnest. Roebourne, which would become the oldest surviving town in the North West, was gazetted in 1866 on a site adjoining the Mt Welcome homestead.

In March 1867, a 116-ton wooden schooner, Emma, departed from Tien Tsin Harbor with 41 people, approximately one third of the settler population of the north-west; the ship disappeared before reaching Fremantle. Among those lost was Trevarton Sholl.

=== Involvement in First Nations Massacre ===
Conflict between settlers and local indigenous people peaked during 1868–69. On the night of 6–7 February 1868, Police Constable William Griffis and his Aboriginal assistant Peter, along with a pearler called George Breem, were killed by members of the Jaburara (or Yaburara) people on the shores of Nickol Bay, near the Jaburara heartland of Dampier Peninsula (later renamed Burrup Peninsula). Another pearler, Henry Jermyn disappeared shortly afterwards. In response, Sholl organised, armed and supplied two groups of mounted men, sworn in as special constables. On 14–15 February, a party led by Alexander McRae, and authorized and supported by Sholl, travelled overland to the peninsula, while another, led by John Withnell sailed on a ship chartered for the purpose, to the tip of the peninsula. The two mounted parties attacked Jaburara people on the peninsula and the nearby islands of the Dampier Archipelago. The number and identity of those killed by the special constables in the "Flying Foam Massacre" is unknown; estimates range from two to 150, although a figure of 30–40 dead is often cited. The Jaburara population collapsed soon afterwards, in part because of their recruitment by pearlers. Sholl was criticised by other officials and at least one northern pastoralist, WA Taylor, who claimed that Griffis had attracted animosity by seducing and/or raping a Jaburara woman; Taylor's claim is also supported by oral tradition among indigenous people in the area. The following year, the killing of station workers, both white and Aboriginal, by indigenous hunter-gatherers at ET Hooley's station, the only one in operation on the Ashburton River, resulted in R. J. Sholl overseeing further expeditions by armed, mounted police and settlers, culminating in the so-called "Battle of Minderoo" (18 July 1869). However, these reprisals came too late to prevent the abandonment of Hooley's station.

=== 1870–1886 ===
In early 1872, copper ore was discovered near Roebourne. The region's first mine opened and within a year 40 tons had been exported.

A major cyclone struck the region on 20 March 1872, killing several people, injuring many others (including Sholl himself), killing more than 5,000 sheep. and destroying or unroofing every building in Roebourne. Sholl estimated that damage worth between £12,000 and £20,000 (approximately $1.8–3.0 million in 2012) was caused to the region. An even larger cyclone hit the region on 6 January 1881 and, in spite of building improvements over the preceding nine years, had deadly consequences for the pearling industry, killing 16 people and sinking or beaching all but one vessel in the area.

During the 1870s, while indigenous workers were still invaluable to employers, an ongoing decline in the local Aboriginal population led to the recruitment of male workers from South East Asia, often West Timorese people (who were usually referred to as "Kupangers" at the time) and ethnic Chinese workers from Singapore.

The need to protect Aboriginal workers was expressed by R. J. Sholl in, for example, his submission towards the 1873 Pearl Shell Fishery Regulation Act. However, Sholl remained close to business people such as Broadhurst, who were attracting attention due to deaths, disease and injury amongst their indigenous employees.

Sholl bought the lease of Mount Welcome Station from the Withnell family in 1879, after which the property was operated by his sons.

In 1881, Sholl was appointed Police Magistrate and Magistrate of the Local Court at Perth, and Resident Magistrate for the Swan District and Magistrate of the Local Court at Guildford. His successor as Resident Magistrate was Edward Hayes Laurence, nephew of Frederick Barlee (who had been transferred British Honduras as Lieutenant-Governor in 1877).

Sholl refused the appointment and retired on a pension rather than move from Roebourne. Prolonged ill-health resulted in Sholl's departure from Roebourne in April 1883, when he moved to Perth. Sholl died at the residence of his daughter, Penelope Scott (1856–1929) and her husband, Dr Edward Scott JP on 19 June 1886.

Robert John Sholl was buried in the Anglican Cemetery at East Perth the day after his death.

Four of his sons were also prominent:

- Trevarton Sholl (1845–1867), explorer, public servant and diarist;
- Richard Adolphus Sholl (1847–1919), Postmaster General of WA (1889–1900);
- Robert Frederick Sholl (1848–1909), MLC/MLA, pearler, investor in real estate and mining, representative at the Australasian Federal Convention of 1897, and;
- Horatio William (Horace) Sholl (1852–1927), MLC/MLA, pastoralist, pearler and mining proprietor.

Penelope and Edward Scott later moved to England, where one of their sons, Dr Frank Sholl Scott (1886–1952), and one of their grandsons (R. J. Sholl's great grandson), Dr Edward Keith Scott (1918–1995), both became members of the English national rugby team and medical practitioners.

== Posthumous honours and memorials ==
Sholl is the subject of the "1866" plaque, among the 150 St George's Terrace Commemorative Plaques, placed in 1979 to commemorate the sesquicentenary of European settlement in WA.

== See also ==
- William Shakespeare Hall
- Charles Harper (politician)
- Lambton Mount

== Bibliography ==
- Atkinson, Ann; 1991, Chinese Labour and Capital in Western Australia, 1847–1947, [thesis, Murdoch University] (10 September 2012).
- The Australian Encyclopaedia, Volume 5, 1977, Sydney, Grolier Society of Australia.
- The Australian Encyclopaedia, Volume 9, 1983, Sydney, Grolier Society of Australia.
- Bain, MA;1982, Full Fathom Five, Perth, Artlook Books.
- Colonial Secretary [Barlee, Frederick], 1865, "Instructions to the Government Resident of the North District" Perth, Government of Western Australia [as published by The Inquirer, 25 January 1865] (10 September 2012).
- Battye, James Sykes (1924). Western Australia: A History from its Discovery to the Inauguration of the Commonwealth. Oxford: Oxford University Press. ASIN B00086VAOQ. LCCN 25004763. OCLC 4362013. OL 50547304M. Wikidata Q133867108.
- Birman, Wendy; 1976, "Sholl, Robert John (1819–1886)" Australian Dictionary of Biography, (v6), Carlton Vic., Melbourne University Press.
- Birman, Wendy; 2006, "Sholl, Robert John (1819–1886)" Australian Dictionary of Biography, Online Edition, (10 September 2012).
- Blackburn, Geoff; 1999, Conquest and Settlement: the 21st Regiment of Foot (North British Fusiliers) in Western Australia 1833–40, Carlisle WA, Hesperian Press.
- Bureau of Meteorology; 2012, Tropical Cyclones Affecting the Karratha/Dampier/Roebourne region (10 September 2012).
- Campbell, Judy; 2002, Invisible Invaders: Smallpox and Other Diseases in Aboriginal Australia 1780–1880, Carlton, Melbourne University Press.
- The Commercial News and Shipping Gazette [newspaper; Perth].
- Conole, Peter; 2002, Protect & Serve: a History of Policing in Western Australia, Scarborough WA, Western Australian Police Historical Society.
- Deasey, Denison, 1976, "Warburton, Peter Egerton (1813–1889), explorer", in Bede Nairn (ed.), Australian Dictionary of Biography, v6, Melbourne, Melbourne University Press.
- Erickson, Rica, ed. (1987). Bicentennial Dictionary of Western Australians: Pre-1829 – 1888. Nedlands: UWA Publishing. ISBN 0-85564-278-5. LCCN 88151753. OCLC 19221630. OL 2102384M. Wikidata Q115122719.
- Gara, TJ; 1983, "The Flying Foam Massacre: An Incident on the North West Frontier, Western Australia", in Moya Smith (ed), Archaeology at ANZAAS, Perth, Western Australian Museum.
- Green, Neville; 1995, The Forrest River Massacres, Fremantle WA, Fremantle Arts Centre Press.
- Hennig, P; 2004, "A brief land use history", in Technical Bulletin: an inventory and condition survey of the Pilbara region, Western Australia.
- Henderson, Graeme & Henderson, Kandy-Jane, 1988, Unfinished Voyages 1851–1880, Nedlands WA, UWA Press.
- Honniball, JHM, in Hunt, Lyall J (ed); 1979, Westralian Portraits, Nedlands WA, University of Western Australia Press for the Education Committee of the 150th Anniversary Celebrations.
- The Inquirer [newspaper; Perth; searchable archive].
- Jones, Matthew & McWilliam, Kirn; 2008, Wrecks of the Coral Coast Perth, Western Australian Museum.
- Kimberly, Warren Bert, ed. (1897). History of West Australia . Melbourne: F. W. Niven – via Wikisource.
- Landgate 2006–2007, History of River Names (6 October 2012).
- McCarthy, Michael; 2001, Iron and Steamship Archaeology: Success and Failure on the SS Xantho, New York, Springer.
- Medcalf, Margaret; 1974, "Leake, George Walpole (1825–1895)", Australian Dictionary of Biography, v5, Melbourne, Melbourne University Press.
- Mercer, FR; 1958, The Life of Charles Harper Of "Wood-Bridge", Guildford, Perth, Westralian Farmers Co-operative Printing Works.
- Mossenson, David; 2012, "Irwin, Frederick Chidley (1788–1860)", Australian Dictionary of Biography, Online Edition (30 September 2012).
- O'Connor, Sue; 2008, "Boat images in the rock art of northern Australia with particular reference to the Kimberley, Western Australia", in: Geoffrey Clark, Foss Leach & Sue O'Connor (eds) Islands of Inquiry: colonisation, seafaring and the archaeology of maritime landscapes, Canberra, ANU E Press.
- The Perth Gazette and Independent Journal of Politics and News [searchable archive], 1848–1864.
- The Perth Gazette and West Australian Times [searchable archive], 1864–1874.
- The Perth Gazette and Western Australian Journal [searchable archive], 1833–1847.
- Richards, Christopher; 1990, There Were Three Ships, Perth, UWA Press.
- Sherwood, George (ed), 1913–16, The Pedigree Register, Vol. III, London, George Sherwood.
- South Australian Register [newspaper; Adelaide; searchable archive].
- Veth, Peter; Bradshaw, Elizabeth; Gara, Tom; Hall, Nic; Haydock, Phillip & Kendrick, Peter; 1993; Burrup Peninsula Aboriginal Heritage Project: A Report to the Department of Conservation and Land Management, Perth, Perth, Department of Conservation and Land Management.
- William, Charles; Clement, George & Boase, Frederic; 1876, An Account Of The Families Of Boase Or Bowes, Originally Residing At Paul And Madron In Cornwall; And Of Other Families Connected With Them By Marriage, &c. Exeter, William Pollard (21 September 2012).
- The West Australian [newspaper, searchable archive], 1879–1954.
- The Western Australian Times, [searchable archive], 1874–1879.
- Western Australian Explorers' Diaries Project, n.d. Explorers' Diary of Western Australia, explorationswa.com.au (30 September 2012).
- Western Australian Museum, n.d., Nautilus (30 September 2012).
- Willis, H. A.; 2010, "Poxy history: Smallpox and Aboriginal history", Quadrant, v 54, n9, pp. 70–73.
