= Camden Harbour, Western Australia =

Short-lived location in Western Australia

Coordinates: 15.492°S 124.629°E

Camden Harbour was a short-lived settlement in the Kimberley region of Western Australia in 1864–1865 that was situated in the larger Camden Sound. The settlement was also known as the Camden Harbour Expedition, as well as the Government Camp.

Ships known to have transported people to the settlement included Calliance, which was wrecked on its shores.

A number of families settled and explored from this location, however it did not continue after 1865. The Sholl family were one of such families that were part of the community.

Camden Harbour was visited in June 1865 by the crew of the tiny Forlorn Hope, who were well received by Government Resident Robert J. Sholl and Government Surveyor James Cowle, but found them and other settlers, many from Victoria, despondent and weary. The ground was hard and stony and the grass of little value to the few remaining sheep, who were weak and dying. As the crew left they witnessed the burning by Victorian settlers of Calliance's hull, to recover her copper sheathing.

Charles Smith Bompas was dismissed as Camden Harbour's doctor by Sholl around October 1865, having only been there about a month. Bompas left the settlement on Kestrel shortly after.

The location has been visited in the twentieth and twenty-first centuries by Kimberley cruise ships.
