= Richard Sholl =

Australian public servant (1847–1919)

Captain Richard Adolphus Sholl, J.P., (18 December 1847 – 9 May 1919) was a Postmaster-General in Western Australia.

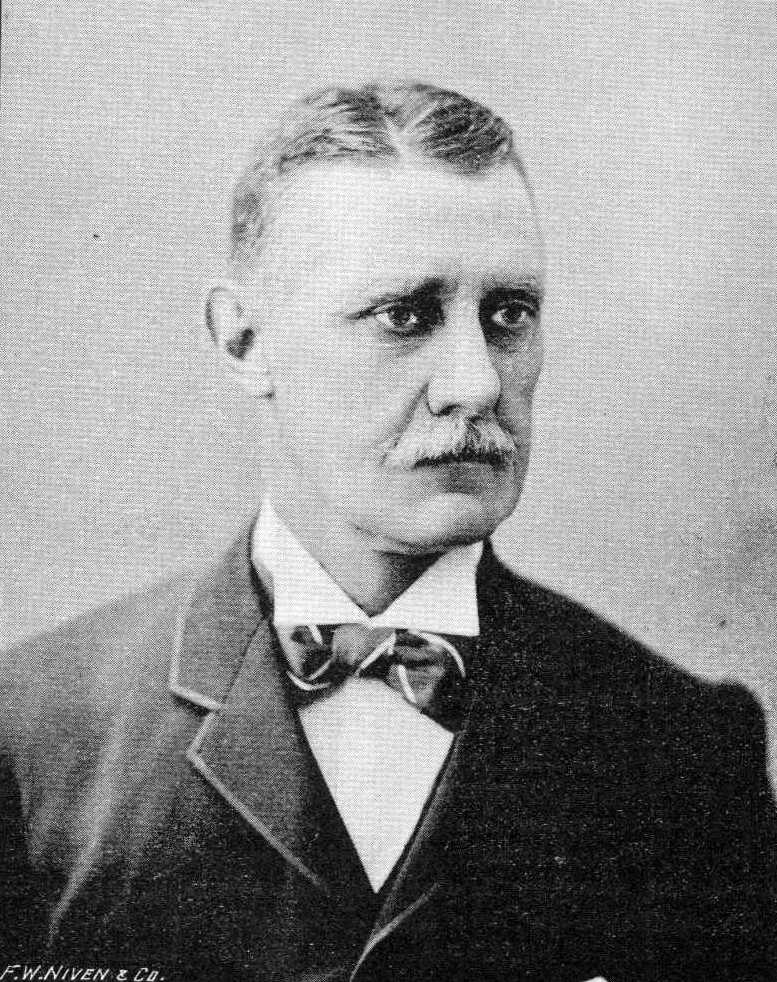
Richard Adolphus Sholl c.1897

Sholl was the son of Robert John Sholl and Mary Ann (née Berckelman) his wife, and was born in Bunbury, Western Australia. He entered the Civil Service of Western Australia as a probation clerk in the Post Office in 1863, and became Chief Clerk of the department in 1873; Chief Clerk and Accountant of the Treasury in 1879; Chief Clerk of the Post Office in 1881; and Postmaster-General in 1889. He became lieutenant in the Metropolitan Rifles in 1875, captain in 1883, and captain commandant in 1888. He was appointed a Justice of the Peace of the colony in 1891. Captain Sholl married Mary Howard, daughter of the late Lieutenant-Colonel Sanders, late 30th Regiment on 7 January 1887; having earlier married Eline Florence Ashton (died 1877) on 19 September 1872 by who he had a daughter and two sons.

Sholl was deputy postmaster-general in Western Australia from 1901, when the Commonwealth of Australia took over posts and telegraphs, and retired in 1904. Sholl was also director of the Perth Building Society and for many years honorary secretary of the West Australian Turf Club.
