= Chapter I of the Constitution of Australia =

Establishes the Parliament of Australia

Chapter I of the Constitution of Australia establishes the Parliament of Australia and its role as the legislative branch of the Government of Australia. The chapter consists of 60 sections which are organised into 5 parts.

== Part I: General ==
Part I contains 6 sections:

- Section 1: Legislative power
- Section 2: Governor-General
- Section 3: Salary of Governor-General
- Section 4: Provisions relating to Governor-General
- Section 5: Sessions of Parliament. Prorogation and dissolution
- Section 6: Yearly session of Parliament

== Part II: The Senate ==
Part II contains 17 sections:

- Section 7: The Senate
- Section 8: Qualification of electors
- Section 9: Method of election of senators in the senate
- Section 10: Application of State laws
- Section 11: Failure to choose senators
- Section 12: Issue of writs
- Section 13: Rotation of senators
- Section 14: Further provision for rotation
- Section 15: Casual vacancies
- Section 16: Qualifications of senator
- Section 17: Election of President
- Section 18: Absence of President
- Section 19: Resignation of senator
- Section 20: Vacancy by absence
- Section 21: Vacancy to be notified
- Section 22: Quorum
- Section 23: Voting in the Senate

== Part III: The House of Representatives ==
Part III contains 17 sections:

- Section 24: Constitution of House of Representatives in Australia
- Section 25: Provision as to races disqualified from voting
- Section 26: Representatives in first Parliament
- Section 27: Alteration of number of members
- Section 28: Duration of House of Representatives
- Section 29: Electoral divisions
- Section 30: Qualification of electors
- Section 31: Application of State laws
- Section 32: Writs for general election
- Section 33: Writs for vacancies
- Section 34: Qualifications of members
- Section 35: Election of Speaker
- Section 36: Absence of Speaker
- Section 37: Resignation of member
- Section 38: Vacancy by absence
- Section 39: Quorum
- Section 40: Voting in House of Representatives

== Part IV: Both Houses of the Parliament ==
Part IV consists of 10 sections:

- Section 41: Right of electors of States
- Section 42: Oath or affirmation of allegiance
- Section 43: Member of one House ineligible for other
- Section 44: Disqualification
- Section 45: Vacancy on happening of disqualification
- Section 46: Penalty for sitting when disqualified
- Section 47: Disputed elections
- Section 48: Allowance to members
- Section 49: Privileges etc. of Houses
- Section 50: Rules and orders

== Part V: Powers of the Parliament in Australia ==
Part V consists of 10 sections:

- Section 51: Legislative powers of the Parliament
- Section 52: Exclusive powers of the Parliament
- Section 53: Powers of the Houses in respect of legislation
- Section 54: Appropriation Bills
- Section 55: Tax Bill
- Section 56: Recommendation of money votes
- Section 57: Disagreement between the Houses
- Section 58: Royal assent to Bills
- Section 59: Disallowance by the Queen
- Section 60: Signification of Queen's pleasure on Bills reserved
