= Section 3 =

Section 3 may refer to:

- Section 3 of the Canadian Charter of Rights and Freedoms
- Section 3 (NYSPHSAA), of the New York State Public High School Athletic Association
- Section 3 lands in the United States
- Section 3 of the Human Rights Act 1998
- Section 3 of the Constitution of Australia
- Section of the Indian Penal Code, describing the punishment of extra territorial offences triable in India
- Third Section of His Imperial Majesty's Own Chancellery, Tsarist secret police
- Section 3 of the Canadian Charter of Rights and Freedoms, regarding voting rights
- Section Three of the Fourteenth Amendment to the United States Constitution, regarding disqualification from office for insurrection or rebellion
- Section Three, Maryland, a village in Chevy Chase

== See also ==
- Three-section staff
- MI3, British Military Intelligence Section 3
