= Section 15 lands =

Public lands

Section 15 lands are public lands in the United States that lie outside designated grazing districts and are administered by the Bureau of Land Management (BLM) under Section 15 of the Taylor Grazing Act of 1934. The BLM authorizes livestock grazing on these lands by issuing leases to private parties.

== Administration and leasing ==
The Taylor Grazing Act was enacted to regulate grazing on public lands to improve rangeland conditions and stabilize the livestock industry. Under Section 15 of the Act, the Secretary of the Interior is authorized to lease vacant, unappropriated, and unreserved public domain lands situated outside established grazing districts for grazing purposes. These leases are issued upon terms and conditions prescribed by the Secretary.

== Revenue distribution ==
Receipts from grazing on Section 15 lands are distributed differently than those from lands within grazing districts (Section 3 lands). Specifically, 50% of the receipts from Section 15 lands are allocated to range betterment projects, and the remaining 50% are returned to the state in which the grazing occurs.

== Management and use ==
The BLM manages Section 15 lands to ensure sustainable use and improvement of rangeland resources. This includes issuing grazing leases, developing allotment management plans, and collaborating with lessees to implement practices that promote healthy rangelands. The management of these lands is guided by principles of multiple use and sustained yield, balancing livestock grazing with other land uses and resource values.

== Historical context ==
The Taylor Grazing Act was a response to the degradation of public rangelands due to overgrazing and drought in the early 20th century. By establishing a system for regulating grazing through permits and leases, the Act aimed to restore and protect these lands, ensuring their long-term productivity and availability for the livestock industry.
