= Speaker of the Australian House of Representatives =

Presiding officer of the lower house of the Parliament of Australia

Speaker of the House of Representatives
- Commonwealth Coat of Arms

- Flag of Australia

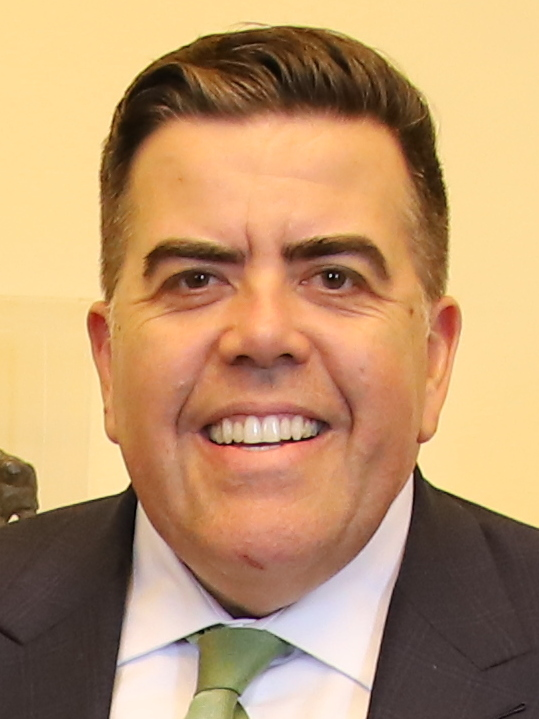
- Incumbent; Milton Dick since 26 July 2022
- House of Representatives
- Style: The Honourable (Formal and Diplomatic); Mister/Madam/no title Speaker (Informal and within the House)
- Appointer: Elected by the House of Representatives
- Term length: At the House's pleasure; elected at the beginning of the new Parliament by a majority of the representatives-elect, and upon a vacancy during Parliament.
- Constituting instrument: Section 35 of the Constitution of Australia
- Inaugural holder: Sir Frederick Holder (1901)
- Formation: 9 July 1900
- Deputy: Sharon Claydon (since 26 July 2022)
- Salary: $369,700 (2019–20)

The speaker of the Australian House of Representatives is the presiding officer of the Australian House of Representatives, the lower house of the Parliament of Australia. Their counterpart in the upper house is the president of the Senate. The office of the speakership was established in 1901 by section 35 of the Constitution of Australia. The primary responsibilities of the speaker are to oversee house debates, determine which members may speak, maintain order and parliamentary and ministerial codes of conduct during sessions, and uphold the rules and standing orders. The current speaker of the House of Representatives is Milton Dick, who was elected on 26 July 2022.

== Term ==
=== Vacancies ===
Section 35 of the constitution provides that the speakership becomes vacant if the speaker is removed from office by a vote of the House, has resigned the office in writing to the Governor-General, or ceases to be a member of the House (including through dissolution of the House prior to a federal election). The Parliamentary Presiding Officers Act 1965 provides that the incumbent speaker is deemed to continue in office, despite resignation or dissolution of the House, "for the purposes of the exercise of any powers or functions of the speaker under a law of the Commonwealth" until a new speaker is chosen. If the speaker dies in office or is physically incapacitated, the deputy speaker is deemed to be the speaker for administrative purposes.

=== Election ===
The Speaker is elected by the House of Representatives in a secret ballot, with an election held whenever the Office of the Speaker is vacant, as set out in Chapter 3 of the House of Representatives Standing and Sessional Orders. The Clerk of the Australian House of Representatives conducts the election. The MPs who move and second the nomination of the successful candidate symbolically drag them to the chair after their election, in accordance with a tradition carried over from Westminster.

Unlike the Speaker of the House of Commons in Britain, the Speaker generally remains an active member of their party. If a party member, the Speaker may continue to attend party meetings, and at general elections will stand as a party candidate. There were two exceptions to this: the first Speaker, Frederick Holder (1901) and Peter Slipper (2011), who resigned from their respective parties upon election as Speaker, and sat as independents.

A Speaker ceases to hold that office if, for any reason, they cease to be a member of the House. There is no convention in Australia that the Speaker should not be opposed in their seat, and three Speakers have been defeated at general elections: Littleton Groom (1929), Walter Nairn (1943) and William Aston (1972). Because the Speaker is always the nominee of the governing party, there is no expectation that a Speaker will continue in office following a change of government. While the Opposition usually nominates one of its own members for Speaker after a general election, this is understood to be a symbolic act, and party discipline is always followed in any ballot.

By reason of section 40 of the Constitution, while in the Chair, a Speaker does not have a deliberative vote, but if there is a tie in votes, the Speaker has a tiebreaker (or casting) vote.

Most Speakers have been senior backbenchers of the party holding office at the start of a new Parliament, or at the time of the death or resignation of an incumbent Speaker. Five Speakers have been former government ministers: William Watt, Littleton Groom, Archie Cameron, Ian Sinclair and Bronwyn Bishop; two have been former Parliamentary Secretaries: Stephen Martin and Tony Smith; and one both a former minister and a former Leader of the Opposition: Billy Snedden. Two were former state premiers: Holder and Watt. There is no convention in Australia that Speakers should resign from Parliament at the end of their term; two Speakers have become Cabinet ministers after having been Speaker: Norman Makin and Gordon Scholes.

Bronwyn Bishop was elected Speaker on 12 November 2013, as the Coalition's first female Speaker of the House and the third female Speaker, after Labor's Joan Child (1986–89) and Anna Burke (2012–13). The 43rd Parliament (2010–13) was the first Australian federal parliament to have had three Speakers: Harry Jenkins (elected September 2010), Peter Slipper (November 2011), and Anna Burke (October 2012).

All male Speakers have been addressed by members as "Mister Speaker" while in the Chair. Joan Child and Bronwyn Bishop chose to be addressed as "Madam Speaker", as female Speakers are usually referred to in other parliaments. Anna Burke broke with this tradition and ruled that her official form of address is merely "Speaker."

==== Recent election results ====
Results of Speaker elections

2025 Speaker of the Australian House of Representatives election
Party	Candidate	Votes	%	±%
Labor	Milton Dick	unopposed	100.00	0.00
Total votes		150	100.00	0.00
Labor hold				

2022 Speaker of the Australian House of Representatives election
Party	Candidate	Votes	%	±%
Labor	Milton Dick	95	62.91	+17.17
Liberal	Andrew Wallace	56	37.08	−17.17
Total votes		151	100.00	+14.57
Labor gain from Liberal		Swing	+17.17	

2021 Speaker of the Australian House of Representatives election
Party	Candidate	Votes	%	±%
Liberal	Andrew Wallace	70	54.26	−45.74
Labor	Rob Mitchell	59	45.74	+45.74
Total votes		129	85.43	-14.57
Liberal hold		Swing	−45.74	

2019 Speaker of the Australian House of Representatives election
Party	Candidate	Votes	%	±%
Liberal	Tony Smith	unopposed	100.00	0.00
Total votes		151	100.00	0.00
Liberal hold				

2016 Speaker of the Australian House of Representatives election
Party	Candidate	Votes	%	±%
Liberal	Tony Smith	unopposed	100.00	0.00
Total votes		150	100.00	0.00
Liberal hold				

2015 Speaker of the Australian House of Representatives election
Party	Candidate	Votes	%	±%
Liberal	Tony Smith	unopposed	100.00	+37.58
Total votes		150	100.00	+0.33
Liberal hold				

2013 Speaker of the Australian House of Representatives election
Party	Candidate	Votes	%	±%
Liberal	Bronwyn Bishop	93	62.42	+62.42
Labor	Rob Mitchell	56	39.60	−60.40
Total votes		129	99.33	-0.33
Liberal gain from Labor				

2012 Speaker of the Australian House of Representatives election
Party	Candidate	Votes	%	±%
Labor	Anna Burke	unopposed	100.00	+100.00
Total votes		150	100.00	0.00
Labor gain from Independent				

2011 Speaker of the Australian House of Representatives election
Party	Candidate	Votes	%	±%
Independent	Peter Slipper	unopposed	100.00	+100.00
Total votes		150	100.00	
Independent gain from Labor				

== Role ==
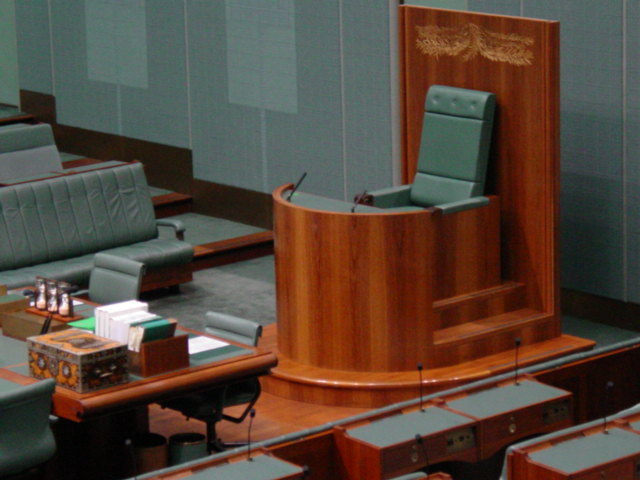
The Speaker's chair in the House of Representatives

The Speaker's principal duty is to preside over the House and maintain order in the House, uphold Standing Orders (rules of procedure), rule on points of order, and protect the rights of backbench members.

Australian parliaments are notoriously rowdy, and the Speaker frequently exercises the disciplinary powers vested in them under Standing Orders. The Speaker may summarily order a Member to excuse themself from the House for one hour. For more serious offences, the Speaker may "name" a Member, saying "I name the Honourable Member for X," following the House's convention that Members are always referred to by their electorate. The House then votes on a motion to suspend the Member for 24 hours. (The House also had the power to permanently expel a Member, but this happened only once, in 1920: the member was Hugh Mahon. The House no longer has the power to expel a member from membership of the House under Section 8 of the Parliamentary Privileges Act 1987.)

The Speaker, in conjunction with the President of the Senate, also administers Parliament House, Canberra, with the assistance of an administrative staff in the Australian parliamentary departments. The Speaker has accountability obligations to the Parliament for the Department of the House of Representatives. Together with the President, the Speaker also had such accountability obligations to the Parliament in respect of the Department of Parliamentary Services.

A member of the House who wishes to resign would tender their resignation to the Speaker (but not to an Acting Speaker), or if there is no Speaker to the Governor-General. During the Joint Sitting of 1974 the Speaker of the Australian House of Representatives Jim Cope was the presiding officer.

== Impartiality ==
While impartial, the Speaker does not usually quit the membership of their party like the Speaker of the House of Commons. Although the first Speaker, Sir Frederick Holder, resigned from the Free Trade Party upon taking the role in accordance with traditional Westminster convention, subsequent speakers did not follow this convention. The only other speaker to date who resigned from their party was Peter Slipper, chosen from the opposition, who resigned from the Liberal Party the day after his election to the chair.

On the other hand, the Speaker is not an active political figure like the Speaker of the United States House of Representatives. They do not take part in debates in the House, do not vote in the House except in the (relatively infrequent) event of a tied vote, and do not speak in public on party-political issues (except at election time in their own constituency). They are expected to conduct the business of the House in an impartial manner, and generally do so.

There have been several memorable clashes between Speakers and the governments:

- In 1929 Speaker Littleton Groom declined to come into the House and cast a vote in committee of the whole (what is now known as consideration in detail ) when his vote would have saved the Bruce government from defeat. As a result, he was expelled from the Nationalist Party and defeated in his constituency at the subsequent election.
- In 1975 the Whitlam government refused to support Speaker Jim Cope when he named government minister Clyde Cameron for disrespect to the Chair: normally this would have resulted in the minister's suspension from the House. The Speaker resigned on the spot. This is the only occasion on which a Government failed to support a Speaker after a Member had been named.
- In 1982 Speaker Billy Snedden refused to insist that an opposition frontbencher, Bob Hawke, retract an allegation that the Prime Minister, Malcolm Fraser, was a liar. Snedden stood his ground despite furious demands from government members that Hawke either be made to retract or be named.
- In 2011, a Speaker survived being countermanded by the House. After a contentious debate on carbon pricing in which Speaker Harry Jenkins declared a "general warning" for all members, Liberal MP Bob Baldwin interjected and was named by the Speaker. The Government accordingly moved that he be suspended, but Baldwin was supported by the Coalition, independent MP Rob Oakeshott and WA Nationals MP Tony Crook. The resulting vote on suspending Baldwin for 24 hours failed 71–72. Convention would normally have required the Speaker to resign, but the House of Representatives immediately thereafter passed a motion of confidence in the Speaker, and as a consequence, Speaker Jenkins continued in office.

=== Speakers of or from opposition parties ===
While speakers normally come from the governing party, there have been several exceptions.

Peter Slipper was a member of the Liberal Party when elected as Speaker, but resigned a day later. Slipper's elevation to the speakership occurred due to the hung parliament resulting from the 2010 election, which saw the ALP form a minority government.

In the previous hung parliament elected at the 1940 election, the United Australia Party's Walter Nairn continued as Speaker when the ALP formed a new government in the middle of the parliamentary term.

Opposition MP Carty Salmon initially served as speaker for the first federal Australian majority government, the Andrew Fisher Labor government, resulting from the 1910 election.

At the 1913 election, Labor's Charles McDonald was offered retention of the Speakership by the incoming one-seat-majority Commonwealth Liberal Party, but declined – later however, after Labor's return to government at the 1914 election, McDonald regained the Speakership until the subsequent election in 1917 despite the mid-term change to a Nationalist Party government.

== Entitlements ==
The speaker's salary is determined by the Remuneration Tribunal, an independent statutory body. As of 1 July 2019, the incumbent is entitled to a parliamentarian's base salary of A$211,250 plus an additional 75% loading, equating to a salary of approximately $369,700. Assuming they hold no other positions, the deputy speaker has a salary of $253,500 (20% loading), the second deputy speaker $238,700 (13% loading), and members of the speaker's panel $217,600 (3% loading).

A member elected speaker is entitled to the title "The Honourable" while in office, which, with the approval of the King of Australia, may be retained for life. This privilege is usually only given to those who have served as speaker for at least three years. Harry Jenkins Jr. was the first speaker to ask that "The Honourable" title not be used in reference to him, while also making clear that he was not attempting to set a precedent for future speakers; he was simply not personally comfortable with the title.

== Official dress ==
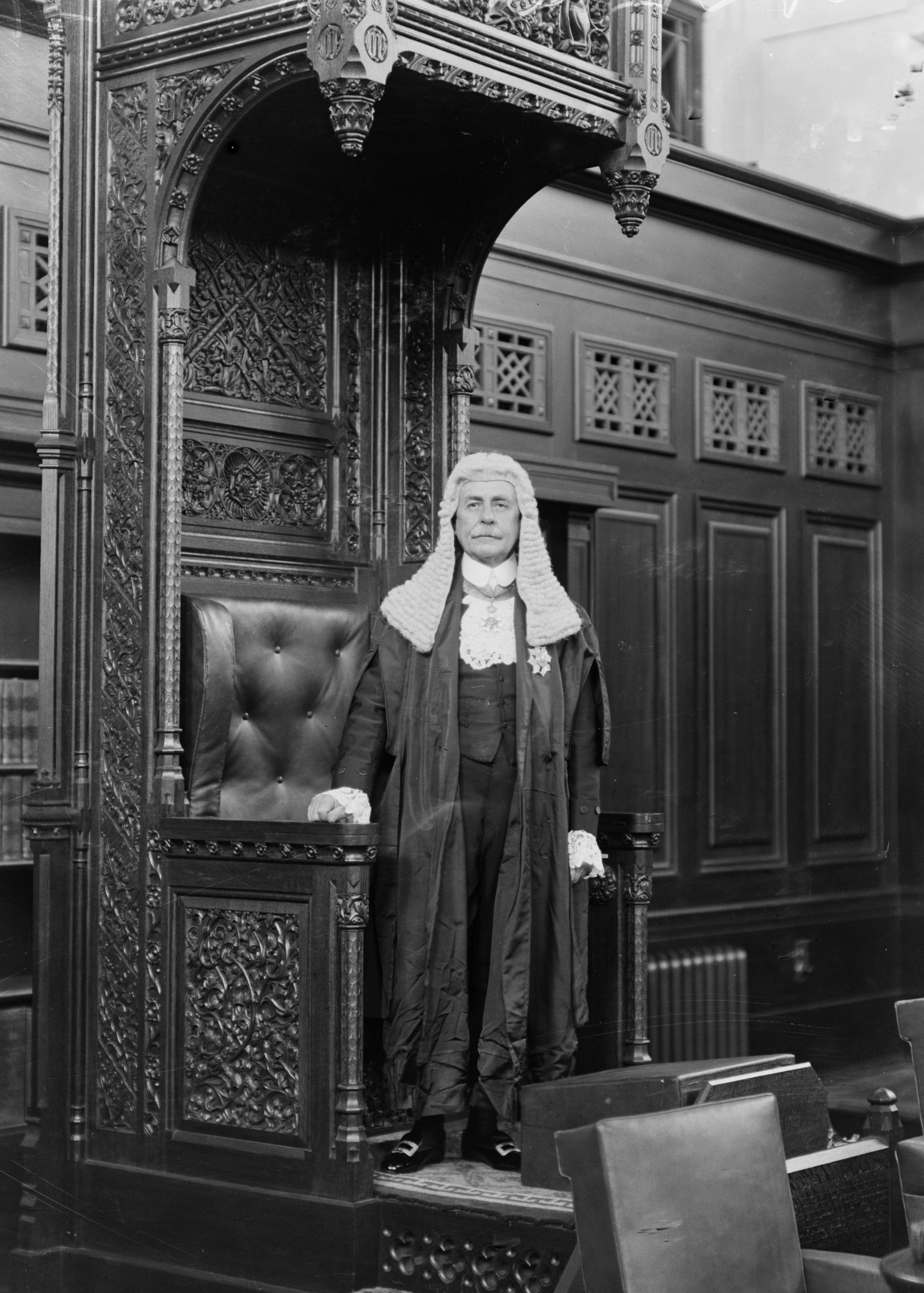
Sir Littleton Groom (Speaker 1926–1929) standing by the speaker's chair in Old Parliament House, Canberra, in the traditional speaker's garb

Following the Westminster tradition inherited from the House of Commons of the United Kingdom, the traditional dress of the Speaker includes components of Court dress such as a black silk lay-type gown (similar to a King's Counsel gown), a wing collar and a lace jabot or bands (another variation included a white bow tie with a lace jabot), bar jacket, and a full-bottomed wig. The wig available for use by the speaker was used by Herbert 'Doc' Evatt when he was a High Court Justice (1930–1940) and was donated to the Parliament by Evatt when he was elected to the House in 1951. The wig is currently on loan from the speaker's office to the Museum of Australian Democracy. Another addition used by earlier speakers, though only for the most formal occasions, included court shoes and hose.

The dress of Speakers has often varied according to the party in power and the personal choice of the Speaker. All Labor Speakers have eschewed the traditional dress in favour of ordinary business attire as appropriate for a member of parliament, following the example set by their first Speaker, Charles McDonald. Most non-Labor Speakers before 2012 wore some variation of the traditional dress.

Billy Snedden (1976–1983) was the last Speaker to wear the full traditional attire of the Speaker, complete with the wig. On the election of the Howard government in 1996, the new Speaker, Bob Halverson, chose to wear the Speaker's traditional attire upon his election in April 1996, but without the wig. Speaker Ian Sinclair opted to wear a gown, albeit of a simpler academic style, during his brief term in 1998, a practice mirrored by his successors, Neil Andrew and David Hawker. Upon his election in late 2011, Peter Slipper went a step toward restoring the traditional dress by wearing a gown and bar jacket over his business attire. Slipper also took to wearing a white long tie or bow tie, in a variation from the lace jabot or bands. For example, he wore a wing collar with white bow tie and bands on the occasion of his first formal procession into parliament. Speaker Bronwyn Bishop, the first non-Labor woman to hold the post, opted for business attire with no gown after her election in 2013. Subsequent Coalition speakers, Tony Smith and Andrew Wallace, likewise opted for business attire.

== List of speakers of the House of Representatives ==
The following is a list of speakers of the House of Representatives.

Upon dissolution of the House prior to a federal election, the incumbent speaker is "deemed by law to continue in office for administrative purposes until the election of a new speaker" at the beginning of the next parliament.

#	Name	Party	State	Term start	Term end	Term in office
1	Sir Frederick Holder	Independent	South Australia	9 May 1901	23 July 1909	8 years, 75 days
2	Carty Salmon	Liberal	Victoria	28 July 1909	19 February 1910	206 days
3	Charles McDonald	Labor	Queensland	1 July 1910	23 April 1913	2 years, 296 days
4	Elliot Johnson	Liberal	New South Wales	9 July 1913	30 July 1914	1 year, 21 days
(3)	Charles McDonald	Labor	Queensland	8 October 1914	26 March 1917	2 years, 169 days
(4)	Sir Elliot Johnson	Nationalist	New South Wales	14 June 1917	6 November 1922	5 years, 145 days
5	William Watt	Nationalist	Victoria	28 February 1923	3 October 1925	2 years, 217 days
6	Sir Littleton Groom	Nationalist	Queensland	13 January 1926	16 September 1929	3 years, 246 days
7	Norman Makin	Labor	South Australia	20 November 1929	27 November 1931	2 years, 7 days
8	George Mackay	United Australia	Queensland	17 February 1932	7 August 1934	2 years, 171 days
9	George Bell	United Australia	Tasmania	23 October 1934	27 August 1940	5 years, 309 days
10	Walter Nairn	United Australia	Western Australia	20 November 1940	21 June 1943	2 years, 213 days
11	Sol Rosevear	Labor	New South Wales	22 June 1943	31 October 1949	6 years, 131 days
12	Archie Cameron	Liberal	South Australia	22 February 1950	9 August 1956	6 years, 169 days
13	Sir Jack McLeay	Liberal	South Australia	29 August 1956	31 October 1966	10 years, 63 days
14	William Aston	Liberal	New South Wales	21 February 1967	2 November 1972	5 years, 255 days
15	Jim Cope	Labor	New South Wales	27 February 1973	27 February 1975	2 years, 0 days
16	Gordon Scholes	Labor	Victoria	27 February 1975	11 November 1975	257 days
17	Sir Billy Snedden	Liberal	Victoria	17 February 1976	4 February 1983	6 years, 352 days
18	Harry Jenkins Sr.	Labor	Victoria	21 April 1983	20 December 1985	2 years, 243 days
19	Joan Child	Labor	Victoria	11 February 1986	28 August 1989	3 years, 198 days
20	Leo McLeay	Labor	New South Wales	29 August 1989	8 February 1993	3 years, 163 days
21	Stephen Martin	Labor	New South Wales	4 May 1993	29 January 1996	2 years, 270 days
22	Bob Halverson	Liberal	Victoria	30 April 1996	3 March 1998	1 year, 307 days
23	Ian Sinclair	National	New South Wales	4 March 1998	31 August 1998	180 days
24	Neil Andrew	Liberal	South Australia	10 November 1998	31 August 2004	5 years, 295 days
25	David Hawker	Liberal	Victoria	16 November 2004	17 October 2007	2 years, 335 days
26	Harry Jenkins Jr.	Labor	Victoria	12 February 2008	24 November 2011	3 years, 285 days
27	Peter Slipper	Independent	Queensland	24 November 2011	9 October 2012	320 days
28	Anna Burke	Labor	Victoria	9 October 2012	5 August 2013	300 days
29	Bronwyn Bishop	Liberal	New South Wales	12 November 2013	2 August 2015	1 year, 263 days
30	Tony Smith	Liberal	Victoria	10 August 2015	23 November 2021	6 years, 105 days
31	Andrew Wallace	Liberal	Queensland	23 November 2021	11 April 2022	139 days
32	Milton Dick	Labor	Queensland	26 July 2022	Incumbent	4 years, 115 days

== Assistants to the speaker ==
The House elects two of its members to serve as deputy speaker and second deputy speaker. The speaker also nominates a number of other MPs to assist with chairing proceedings of the House and Federation Chamber, who form the speaker's panel. In order for business to proceed, the House may choose any member to take the chair if the speaker is absent and the previously deputised members are unavailable; this is rare. Any member chairing the House in the absence of the speaker or deputy speakers is addressed as "Acting Deputy Speaker". However, only the deputy and second deputy speakers can serve as "acting speaker", with the full powers of the position.

=== Election ===
The election of either the deputy speaker and second deputy speaker is held when the respective position is vacant. If both positions of deputy speaker and second deputy speaker are vacant (for example at the start of each parliament), then the elections for deputy speaker and second deputy speaker are conducted together in one election. The runner-up in such an election is then deemed to have been elected second deputy speaker.

Until July 2019 (except for a short period between October 2012 and November 2013), standing order 13(c) of the House stated that only a non-government MP may be a second deputy speaker. This comes from the usual convention that the deputy speaker is a government MP, and a non-government MP as the second deputy speaker would "allow people from opposing sides in the two roles of Deputy Speaker and Second Deputy Speaker", as quoted by Labor MP Anthony Albanese. Since 1943, there were only two occasions when the deputy speaker was not held by a government MP, both during the 43rd Parliament when Labor was in minority government. The first occasion was at the start of the 43rd Parliament in September 2010, when Peter Slipper of the Liberal Party was nominated by Labor and defeated Bruce Scott of the National Party to be the deputy speaker. Scott continued to be the second deputy speaker. In this occasion, both positions were held by non-government MPs.

The second occasion was on 9 October 2012, when Scott defeated Labor MP and nominee Steve Georganas and became the deputy speaker. The following day, the House voted to remove standing order 13(c) to allow Georganas (government MP) to be elected as second deputy speaker. Both Scott and Georganas stayed in their roles for the rest of the 43rd Parliament. Standing order 13(c) was reinstated at the start of the 44th Parliament in November 2013.

Standing order 13(c) was altered on 4 July 2019 with bipartisan support. The new standing order, current as of August 2022, states that if a government MP was elected as deputy speaker, then only a non-government MP may be elected as second deputy speaker. Likewise, if a non-government MP was elected as deputy speaker, then only a government MP may be elected as second deputy speaker.

The deputy speakership election held on 10 February 2020 was unique in that the winner Llew O'Brien (nominated by Labor) and the runner-up Damian Drum (nominated by the Coalition government) were both government MPs. As the election was only for the deputy speakership position (the second deputy speaker position was not vacant), Drum was not elected as second deputy speaker. Otherwise, this would have been against standing order 13(c).

=== Deputy speaker ===
The position of deputy speaker was created in 1994 in place of the former position of "chairman of committees", which had existed since the first parliament in 1901. This coincided with the establishment of the Main Committee (now renamed the Federation Chamber).The deputy speaker has the same procedural powers as the speaker while in the chair, including signing messages from the House to the Senate. As well as deputising for the speaker, the deputy speaker chairs the Federation Chamber.

Following the 2022 federal election, Sharon Claydon was elected as deputy speaker.

==== List of deputy speakers and chairmen of committees ====
The title of the office was originally "chairman of committees". This was changed to "deputy speaker and chairman of committees" on 3 November 1992 and to simply "deputy speaker" on 21 February 1994. The terms of deputy speakers technically coincide with terms of parliament, however for the purposes of the table below terms spanning multiple parliaments are deemed to be continuous. Prior to 10 July 1907 the chairman of committees was elected on a sessional basis.

#	Name	Party	State	Term start	Term end	Term in office
1	John Chanter	Protectionist	New South Wales	5 June 1901	22 October 1903	2 years, 139 days
2	Carty Salmon	Protectionist	Victoria	17 March 1904	21 December 1905	1 year, 279 days
3	Charles McDonald	Labor	Queensland	20 June 1906	19 February 1910	3 years, 244 days
4	Alexander Poynton	Labor	South Australia	1 July 1910	23 April 1913	2 years, 296 days
5	James Fowler	Liberal	Western Australia	9 July 1913	30 July 1914	1 year, 21 days
(1)	John Chanter	Labor	New South Wales	9 October 1914	6 November 1922	8 years, 28 days
(1)	John Chanter	National Labor	New South Wales	9 October 1914	6 November 1922	8 years, 28 days
(1)	John Chanter	Nationalist	New South Wales	9 October 1914	6 November 1922	8 years, 28 days
6	Fred Bamford	Nationalist	Queensland	28 February 1923	3 October 1925	2 years, 217 days
7	James Bayley	Nationalist	Queensland	14 January 1926	16 September 1929	3 years, 245 days
8	Charles McGrath	Labor	Victoria	20 November 1929	27 November 1931	2 years, 7 days
8	Charles McGrath	United Australia	Victoria	20 November 1929	27 November 1931	2 years, 7 days
9	George Bell	United Australia	Tasmania	17 February 1932	7 August 1934	2 years, 171 days
10	John Prowse	Country	Western Australia	23 October 1934	21 June 1943	8 years, 241 days
11	Bill Riordan	Labor	Queensland	22 June 1943	16 August 1946	3 years, 55 days
12	Joe Clark	Labor	New South Wales	7 November 1946	31 October 1949	2 years, 358 days
13	Charles Adermann	Country	Queensland	22 February 1950	14 October 1958	8 years, 234 days
14	George Bowden	Country	Victoria	17 February 1959	7 March 1961	2 years, 18 days
15	Philip Lucock	Country	New South Wales	8 March 1961	2 November 1972	11 years, 239 days
16	Gordon Scholes	Labor	South Australia	28 February 1973	27 February 1975	1 year, 364 days
17	Joe Berinson	Labor	Western Australia	27 February 1975	14 July 1975	137 days
18	Harry Jenkins Sr.	Labor	Victoria	19 August 1975	11 November 1975	84 days
(15)	Philip Lucock	National Country	New South Wales	17 February 1976	10 November 1977	1 year, 266 days
19	Clarrie Millar	National Country	Queensland	21 February 1978	4 February 1983	4 years, 348 days
20	Les Johnson	Labor	New South Wales	21 April 1983	19 December 1983	242 days
21	Joan Child	Labor	Victoria	28 February 1984	11 February 1986	1 year, 348 days
22	Leo McLeay	Labor	New South Wales	11 February 1986	29 August 1989	3 years, 199 days
23	Ron Edwards	Labor	Western Australia	29 August 1989	8 February 1993	3 years, 163 days
24	Harry Jenkins Jr.	Labor	Victoria	4 May 1993	29 January 1996	2 years, 270 days
25	Garry Nehl	National	New South Wales	30 April 1996	8 October 2001	5 years, 161 days
26	Ian Causley	National	New South Wales	12 February 2002	17 October 2007	5 years, 247 days
27	Anna Burke	Labor	Victoria	12 February 2008	19 July 2010	2 years, 157 days
28	Peter Slipper	Liberal	Queensland	28 September 2010	24 November 2011	1 year, 57 days
(27)	Anna Burke	Labor	Victoria	24 November 2011	9 October 2012	320 days
29	Bruce Scott	National	Queensland	9 October 2012	9 May 2016	3 years, 213 days
30	Mark Coulton	National	New South Wales	30 August 2016	5 March 2018	1 year, 187 days
31	Kevin Hogan	National	New South Wales	26 March 2018	10 February 2020	1 year, 321 days
32	Llew O'Brien	Liberal National	Queensland	10 February 2020	11 April 2022	2 years, 60 days
32	Llew O'Brien	National	Queensland	10 February 2020	11 April 2022	2 years, 60 days
33	Sharon Claydon	Labor	New South Wales	26 July 2022	Incumbent	4 years, 115 days

=== Second deputy speaker ===
The position of second deputy speaker was created in 1994, primarily as an assistant to the deputy speaker in the Federation Chamber.

==== List of second deputy speakers ====
The terms of second deputy speakers technically coincide with terms of parliament, however for the purposes of the table below terms spanning multiple parliaments are deemed to be continuous.

#	Name	Party	State	Term start	Term end	Term in office
1	Allan Rocher	Liberal	Western Australia	3 March 1994	29 January 1996	1 year, 332 days
1	Allan Rocher	Independent	Western Australia	3 March 1994	29 January 1996	1 year, 332 days
2	Harry Jenkins Jr.	Labor	Victoria	30 April 1996	17 October 2007	11 years, 170 days
3	Bruce Scott	National	Queensland	12 February 2008	9 October 2012	4 years, 240 days
3	Steve Georganas	Labor	South Australia	10 October 2012	5 August 2013	299 days
4	Rob Mitchell	Labor	Victoria	12 November 2013	11 April 2022	8 years, 150 days
5	Ian Goodenough	Liberal	Western Australia	26 July 2022	31 December 2024	2 years, 245 days
5	Ian Goodenough	Independent	Western Australia	1 January 2025	28 March 2025	2 years, 245 days
6	Terry Young	Liberal	Queensland	22 July 2025	Incumbent	1 year, 119 days

=== Speaker's panel ===
The speaker's panel consists of at least four MPs nominated by the speaker at the start of each parliament. The speaker may nominate additional members or revoke membership at any point during the parliament. Members of the panel are called on to chair meetings of the House at the request of the speaker, as well as meetings of the Federation Chamber at the request of the deputy speaker or second deputy speaker. A roster is maintained so that the chair can always be filled. Members of the panel will relinquish the chair to the speaker or deputy speaker "if disorder arises or if special circumstances apply".

Historically, the speaker has nominated both government and opposition MPs to the speaker's panel. However, after the 2010 and 2013 elections opposition members refused to serve on the panel. The practice resumed later in the 2013–16 parliamentary term.
