= Section 2 =

Section 2 may refer to:

- Section 2 (NYSPHSAA), a section of the New York State Public High School Athletic Association
- Section 2 of the Canadian Charter of Rights and Freedoms
- Section 2 of the Constitution of Australia
- Section 2 of the Constitution Act, 1867
- Section 2 of the UK's Mental Health Act 1983
- Section 2 of the Indian Penal Code, describing punishment of offences committed in India
- Section 2 (album), an album by The Howling Hex

== See also ==
- MI2, British Military Intelligence Section 2
