= Commander-in-chief =

Supreme commanding authority of a military

A commander-in-chief (sometimes called a supreme commander or supreme commander-in-chief) is the person who exercises supreme command and control over an armed force. The role may be vested in a head of state, head of government, or another designated officer or government official.

The title used varies by country and language. Generally, English-speaking countries favor "commander-in-chief", while French-speaking countries favor "chief of armies" (French: chef des armées). Most continental European countries use the term "supreme commander", while the Soviet Union, and consequently the post-soviet states, use "supreme commander-in-chief" (Russian: Верховный главнокомандующий).

== Definition ==
In English use, the term "commander in chief" was first used during the English Civil War. A nation's head of state (monarchical or republican) often holds the position of commander-in-chief, even if effective executive power is held by a separate head of government. In a parliamentary system, the executive branch is ultimately dependent upon the will of the legislature; although the legislature does not issue orders directly to the armed forces and therefore does not control the military in any operational sense. The title may also be bestowed on an officer in command of a large military or naval force, and governors-general and colonial governors are also often appointed commander-in-chief of the forces within their territory.

A commander in chief is sometimes referred to as supreme commander, which is sometimes used as a specific term. The term is also used for military officers who hold such power and authority, not always through dictatorship, and as a subordinate (usually) to a head of state (see Generalissimo). The term is also used for officers who hold authority over an individual military branch, special branch or within a theatre of operations.

== Title by country ==
=== Albania ===
According to the Constitution of Albania, the president of the Republic of Albania is the commander-in-chief of Albanian Armed Forces.

=== Argentina ===
Under part II, chapter III, article 99, subsections 12, 13, 14 and 15, the Constitution of Argentina states that the president of the Argentine Nation is the "Commander-in-chief of all the armed forces of the Nation". It also states that the president is entitled to provide military posts in the granting of the jobs or grades of senior officers of the armed forces, and by itself on the battlefield; runs with its organization and distribution according to needs of the Nation and declares war and orders reprisals with the consent and approval of the Argentine National Congress.

The Ministry of Defense is the government department that assists and serves the president in the management of the armed forces (Army, Navy and Air Force).

=== Armenia ===
The prime minister of Armenia holds the title of Supreme Commander in Chief of the Armenian Armed Forces (Armenian: Հայաստանի Զինված ուժերի գերագույն հրամանատար). The hereditary title and rank of Sparapet' (Armenian: սպարապետ) was used to describe the supreme commander of the military forces of ancient and medieval Armenia. Since its introduction in the 2nd century BC, it is often used today to describe famous and high-ranking military officials. Notable Armenians to have held the title include Garegin Nzhdeh, the supreme commander of the Republic of Mountainous Armenia. and Vazgen Sargsyan, the two-time defence minister of Armenia and prime minister in the 1990s.

=== Australia ===
Under chapter II of section 68 titled Command of the naval and military forces, the Constitution of Australia states that:

The command in chief of the naval and military forces of the Commonwealth is vested in the Governor-General as the Queen's representative. (Note: Since September 2022, a reference to the Queen in a clause of the Constitution is now a reference to King Charles III. Section 2 of the Constitution states that provisions referring to the Queen in the Act "shall extend to Her Majesty's heirs and successors".)

In practice, however, the governor-general does not play an active part in the Australian Defence Force's command structure, and the democratically accountable Australian Cabinet (chaired by the prime minister) de facto controls the ADF. The minister for defence and several subordinate ministers exercise this control through the Australian Defence Organisation. Section 8 of the Defence Act 1903 states:

The minister shall have the general control and administration of the Defence Force, and the powers vested in the chief of the defence force, the chief of Navy, the chief of Army and the chief of Air Force by virtue of section 9, and the powers vested jointly in the secretary and the chief of the defence force by virtue of section 9A, shall be exercised subject to and in accordance with any directions of the Minister.

=== Austria ===
Article 80 of the Constitution of Austria stipulates that the president of Austria is the commander-in-chief of the Austrian Armed Forces. The same article designates the minister of defence as being in command of the army.

=== Azerbaijan ===
The Supreme Commander-in-Chief of the Azerbaijani Armed Forces is the President of Azerbaijan.

=== Barbados ===
According to the Constitution of Barbados, the president of Barbados is the commander-in-chief of Barbados Defence Force. Between 1966 and 2021, prior to the transition to a republican system, the monarch of Barbados, Queen Elizabeth II, was head of the Defence Force, with the governor-general of Barbados as her viceroy. The president adopted these powers.

=== Bangladesh ===
First President Sheikh Mujibur Rahman was the supreme commander of all the armed forces of the republic. In absence of him, then vice president Syed Nazrul Islam was acting president and acting supreme commander of all the armed forces of the republic.

The commander-in-chief of Bangladesh Armed Forces is the president, although executive power and responsibility for national defence resides with the prime minister. This is discharged through the Ministry of Defence, headed by the minister of defence, which provides the policy framework and resources to the Armed Forces to discharge their responsibilities in the context of the defence of the country.

The first commander-in-chief, General M. A. G. Osmani, during Bangladesh Liberation War in 1971, who was commander of Muktibahini/Bangladesh Forces, reinstated to active duty by official BD government order, which after independence was gazetted in 1972. He retired on 7 April 1972 and relinquished all authority and duties to the president of Bangladesh.

=== Belarus ===
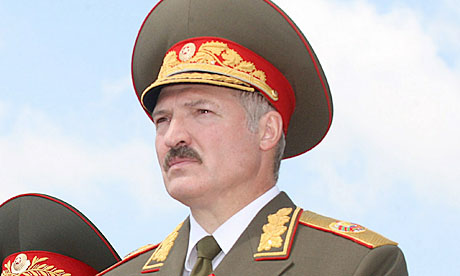
President Alexander Lukashenko wearing the official uniform of the commander-in-Chief of the Armed Forces of Belarus.

The president of Belarus is the commander-in-chief of the Belarusian Armed Forces (Belarusian: Галоўнакамандуючы Узброенымі Сіламі Рэспублікі Беларусь). The Belarusian commander in chief has an official uniform and insignia befitting of the rank, which the president wears on official occasion and ceremonies in relation to the military. The role of commander in chief is laid out in Article 28 of the Constitution of Belarus, which states that he/she has the authority to "appoint and dismiss the high command of the Armed Forces".

=== Belgium ===
Article 167 of the Constitution of Belgium designates the king as the commander-in-chief. In practice, the chief of defence is the head and commander of the Belgian Armed Forces. He reports directly to the minister of defence and is responsible for advising the minister, for the implementation of defence policy and for the administration of the department.

=== Bosnia and Herzegovina ===
According to the Constitution of Bosnia and Herzegovina, the collective presidency of Bosnia and Herzegovina is the commander-in-chief of the Armed Forces of Bosnia and Herzegovina. In peace, the commander-in-chief exercises his command through the minister of defence. In war and in cases where the minister of defence is not fulfilling orders, the commander-in-chief exercises his command directly through the chief of Joint Staff.

=== Brazil ===
Article 142 of the Brazilian Constitution of 1988 states that the Brazilian Armed Forces is under the supreme command of the president of the Republic.

=== Brunei ===
The sultan of Brunei is the commander-in-chief of the Royal Brunei Armed Forces.

=== Canada ===
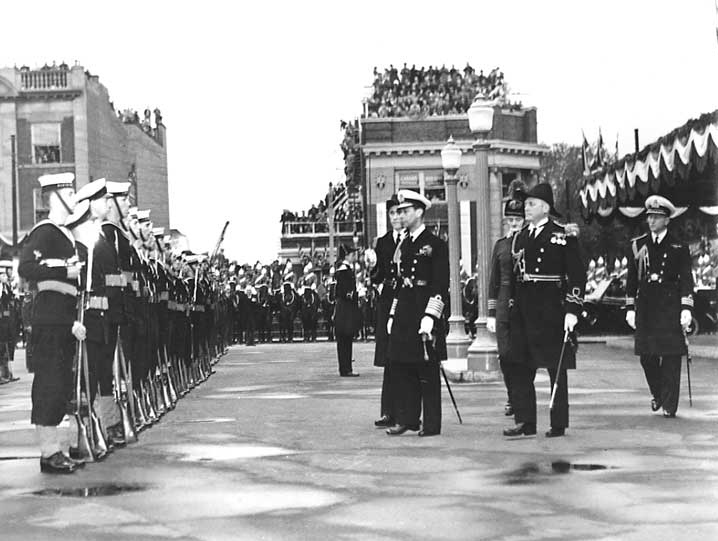
King George VI inspects a Royal Canadian Navy guard of honour during the 1939 royal tour of Canada.

The powers of command-in-chief over the Canadian Armed Forces are vested in the Canadian monarch, and are delegated to the governor general of Canada, who also uses the title Commander-in-Chief. In this capacity, the governor general is entitled to the uniform of a general/flag officer, with the crest of the office and special cuff braid serving as rank insignia.

By constitutional convention, the Crown's prerogative powers over the armed forces and constitutional powers as commander-in-chief are exercised on the advice of the prime minister and the rest of Cabinet, the governing ministry that commands the confidence of the House of Commons. According to the National Defence Act, the minister of national defence is responsible and accountable to the Parliament of Canada for all matters related to national defence and the Canadian Armed Forces.

=== China ===
In China, supreme command of the armed forces is exercised by the Central Military Commission (CMC) of the Chinese Communist Party (CCP). A parallel state CMC (PRC CMC) exists. Legally the two CMCs have separate responsibilities, but the distinction is practically irrelevant because the bodies typically have the same members. Since 1989, the CCP general secretary chairs the CMC, and represents the armed forces in the CCP Politburo Standing Committee, the country's ruling body. Per the chairman responsibility system, the chairman exercises absolute control over the CMC and is the commander-in-chief of the People's Liberation Army (PLA), the People's Armed Police (PAP) and the Militia.

Article 93 of the Constitution of China states the authority to direct the armed forces is invested to the Central Military Commission of the People's Republic of China. The same article also states that the chairman of the Central Military Commission assumes overall responsibility for the work of the Central Military Commission and that it is responsible to the National People's Congress and its Standing Committee. There is also the Central Military Commission of the Chinese Communist Party under the authority of the Party Central Committee. In practice, both commissions have identitical membership, except for a brief period between the Party Congress and the National People's Congress, and are practically the same institutution under the system of "one institution, two names".

Furthermore, Article 80 gives the National People's Congress and its Standing Committee the power to proclaim martial law, proclaim a state of war, and to issue mobilisation orders.

The state president and the CMC chairman are distinctly separate state offices and they have not always been held by the same persons. However, beginning in 1993, during the tenure of Jiang Zemin as General Secretary of the Communist Party and CMC chairman, it has been standard practice to have the offices of the CCP general secretary, president, and the CMC chairman to be normally held by the same person; although the slight differences in the start and end of terms for those respective offices means that there is some overlap between an occupant and his predecessor.

==== Hong Kong ====
When Hong Kong was under British authority, the civilian governor was the ex officio commander-in-chief of the British Forces Overseas Hong Kong. After the territory's handover to the People's Republic of China in 1997, the commanders of the People's Liberation Army Hong Kong Garrison are PLA personnel from mainland China and commanded by the CMC.

=== Croatia ===
According to the Croatian constitution, the president of Croatia is the commander-in-chief of the Armed Forces of the Republic of Croatia. There was originally a rank insignia and name for the position, known as "Vrhovnik". This was held by former President Franjo Tudjman and was abolished after his death. In peace, the commander-in-chief exercises his command through the minister of defence. In war and in cases where the minister of defence is not fulfilling orders, the commander-in-chief exercises his command directly through the chief of General Staff.

=== Czechia ===
According to the 1992 constitution, the president of the Czech Republic is the commander-in-chief of the Armed Forces according to Article 63(1)(c), and appoints and promotes generals under Article 63(1)(f). The president needs the countersignature of the prime minister for decisions concerning the above-mentioned provisions as per Articles 63(3–4), or otherwise, they are not valid. The prime minister may delegate to other ministers the right to countersign these decisions of the president. The political responsibility for the Armed Forces is borne by the Government, which in Article 67 is defined as the "supreme body of executive power". According to Articles 39 & 43, the Parliament must give consent to the dispatch of Czech military forces outside the territory of the Czech Republic.

The Ministry of Defence is the central authority of the state administration for the control of the Armed Forces. The actual day-to-day management is vested in the chief of the general staff, the Czech chief of defence equivalent.

=== Denmark ===
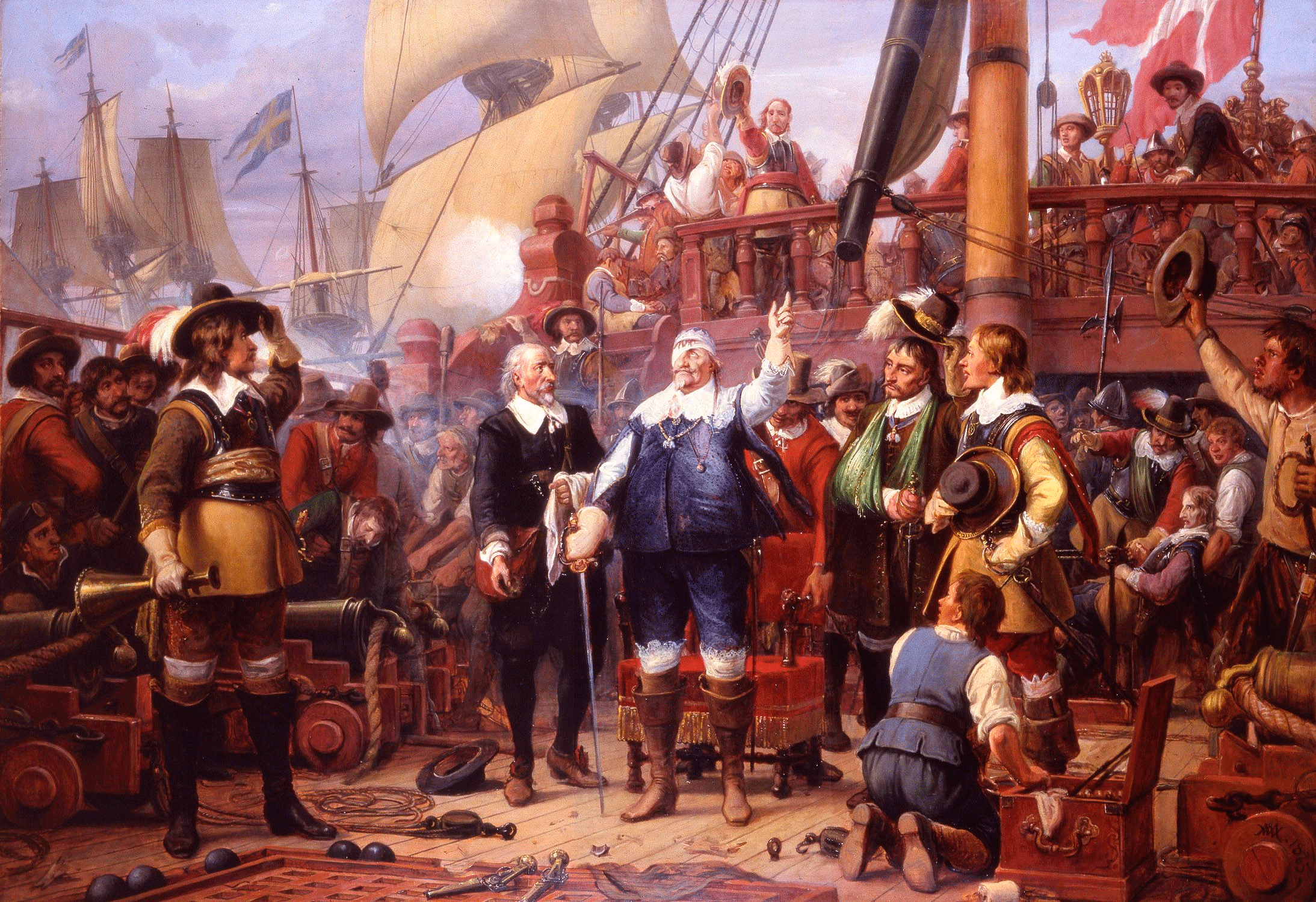
King Christian IV on board his flagship during the 1644 Battle of Colberger Heide, by Wilhelm Marstrand. The king's personal commitment during the battle, are memorialised in first lines of the Danish royal anthem.

The position of the Danish monarch as the head of the military is deeply rooted in tradition. While the 1953 constitution does not explicitly designate the monarch as commander-in-chief; it is implicit, given the general provision in article 12 and the more specific wording of article 19 (2): "Except for purposes of defence against an armed attack upon the Realm or Danish forces, the King shall not use military force against any foreign state without the consent of the Folketing. Any measure which the King may take in pursuance of this provision shall forthwith be submitted to the Folketing".

However, when reading the Danish Constitution, it is important to bear in mind that the king in this context is understood by Danish jurists to be read as the government (consisting of the prime minister and other ministers). This is a logical consequence of articles 12, 13 and 14, all of which in essence stipulates that the powers vested in the monarch can only be exercised through ministers, who are responsible for all acts. Thus, the Government, in effect, holds the supreme command authority implied in articles 12 and 19(2).

The Danish Defence Law (Danish: Forsvarsloven) designates in article 9 the minister of defence as the supreme authority in Defence (Danish: højeste ansvarlige myndighed for forsvaret). Under the minister is the chief of defence, the senior-ranking professional military officer heading the Defence Command, who commands the Army, the Navy, the Air Force and other units not reporting directly to the Ministry of Defence.

=== Dominican Republic ===
According to the Constitution, Article 128, Section II, Title IV, the president is the head of foreign policy, the civil administration and the commander-in-chief of the Armed Forces, the National Police and all other state's security agencies.

=== Egypt ===
In Egypt, the president of the Republic holds the ceremonial title of Supreme Commander of the Armed Forces. A member of the government, usually defence minister, is commander-in-chief of the Egyptian Armed Forces. The president is the only individual capable of declaring war. With the exception of Mohamed Morsi, who briefly served as president from 2012 to 2013, all Egyptian presidents have been former military officers. During the Yom Kippur War, the president played a major role at all levels of the planning of the war, and was, in a literal sense, Supreme Commander of the Armed Forces, giving direct orders to the commanders from the headquarters during the war as field marshal of the army, marshal of the air force and air defence forces and admiral of the navy.

=== Eswatini ===
The king of Eswatini is the commander in chief of the Umbutfo Eswatini Defence Force.

=== Ethiopia ===
The 1995 Constitution designates the prime minister of Ethiopia as "Commander-in-Chief of the national armed forces" in Article 74(1).

=== Finland ===
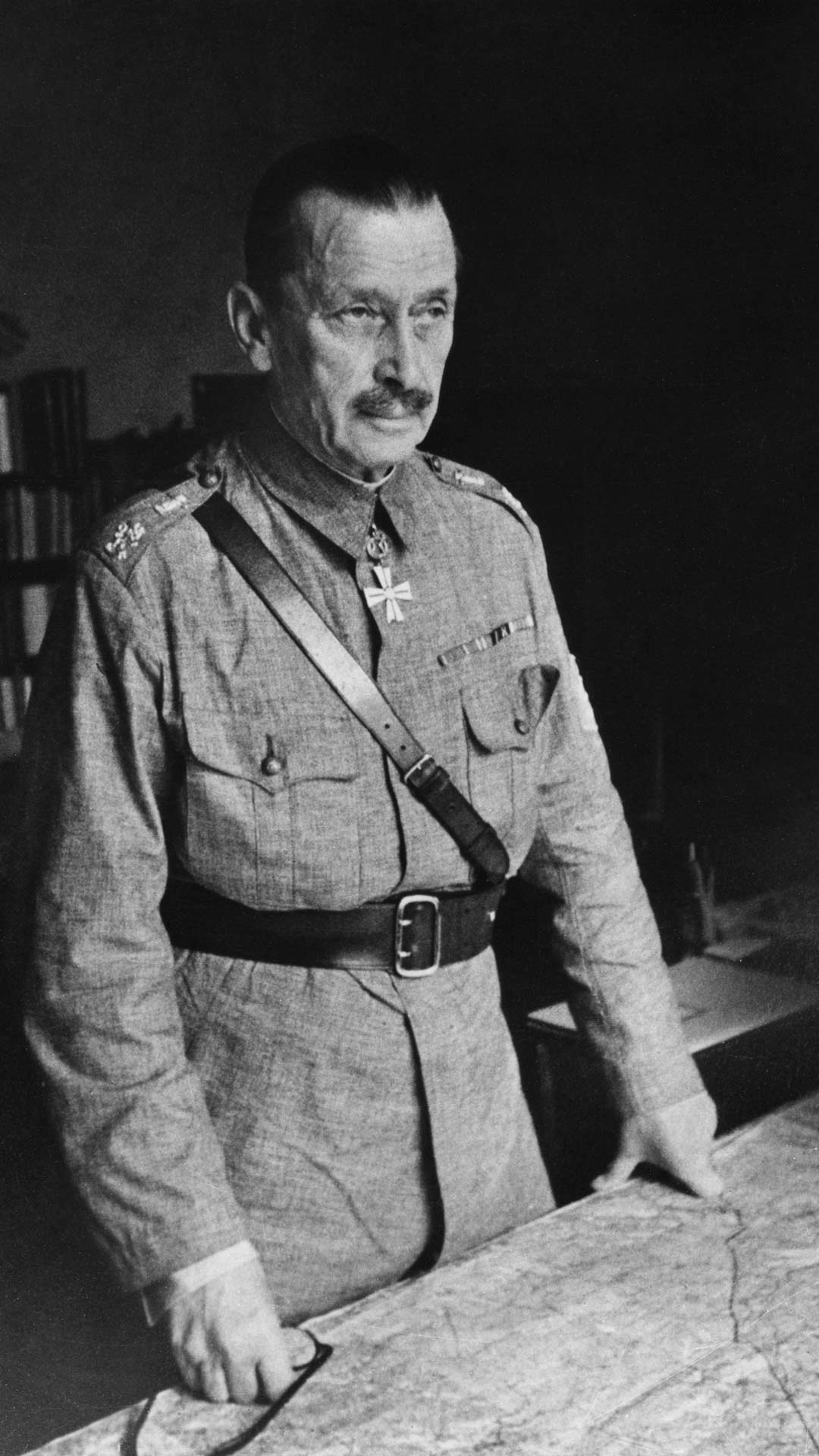
C. G. E. Mannerheim, the Marshal of Finland, as the commander-in-chief in 1941 during the Continuation War

According to the Finnish constitution, the president of Finland is the commander-in-chief of all Finnish military forces. In practice, the everyday command and control is in the hands of the chief of defence and the commander of the Finnish Border Guard. The economic administration of the Finnish Defence Force is the responsibility of Ministry of Defence. The duty of the president is to decide upon

- main principles of the military defence of the realm
- principles of the execution of the military defence
- other military command matters with wide-ranging importance to the military activity or the military establishment
- any other military command issue that he wishes to decide upon

Since the constitutional reform of 2000, the minister of defence has the right to be present when the president uses his command powers, unless the matter is of immediate concern. In questions of strategic importance, the prime minister has the same right.

The president commissions and promotes officers and decides on activating reservists for extraordinary service and on the mobilisation of the Defence Forces. If Parliament is not in session when a decision to mobilise is taken, it must be immediately convened. Declarations of a state of emergency (Finnish: valmiustila, literally, "state of preparedness") and state of war (Finnish: puolustustila, lit. "state of defence") are declared by a presidential decree, given after a motion by the government, which is then submitted to the Parliament for ratification.

The president has, in a state of emergency, the right to transfer the position of the commander-in-chief to another Finnish citizen.

=== France ===
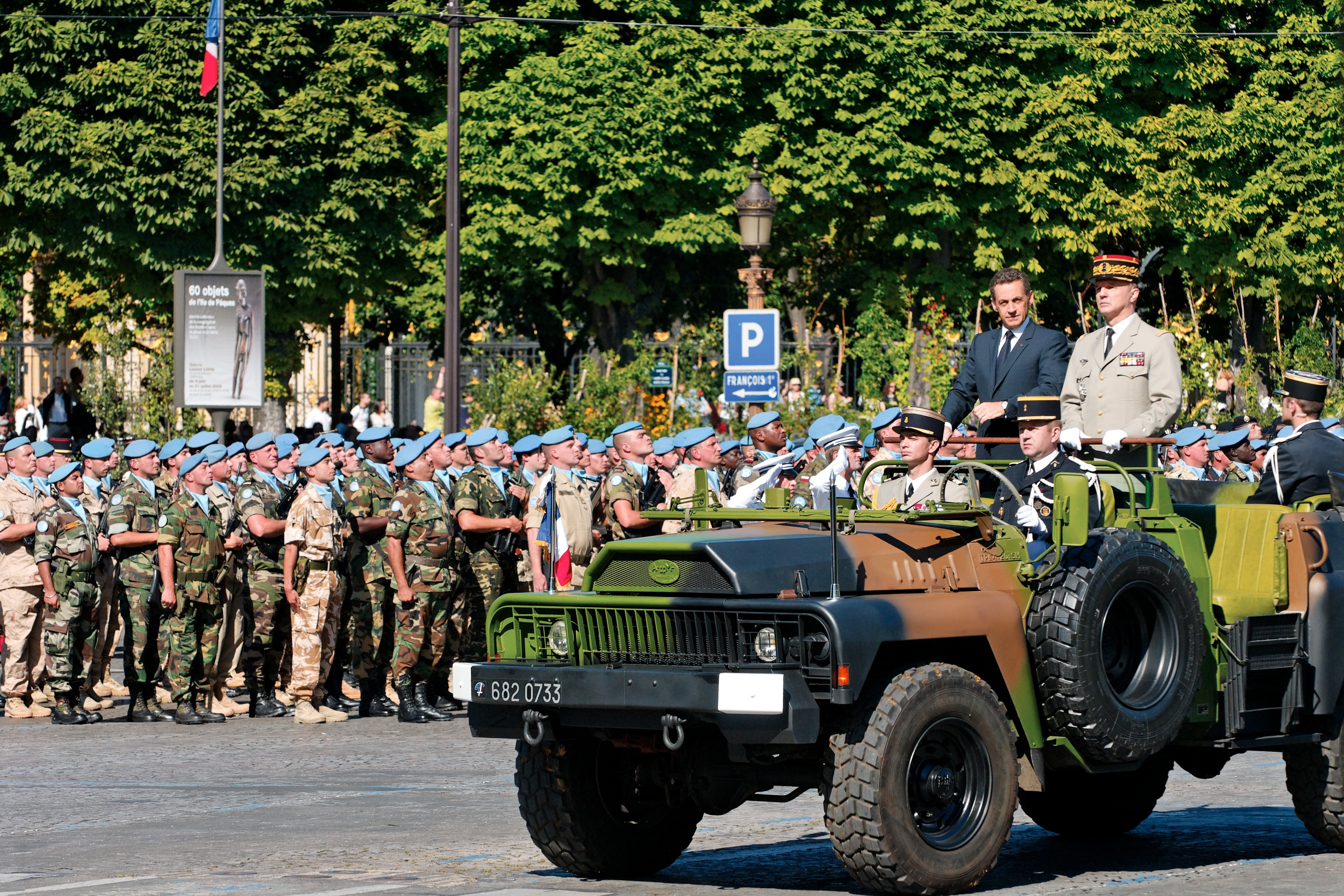
President of the Republic Nicolas Sarkozy and General Jean-Louis Georgelin, Chief of the Defence Staff, reviewing troops during the 2008 Bastille Day military parade on the Champs-Élysées in Paris.

In France, the president of the Republic is designated as "Chef des Armées" (literally "Chief of the Armies") under article 15 of the Constitution; the officeholder is as such the supreme executive authority in military affairs. Article 16 provides the president with extensive emergency powers.

However, owing to the nature of the semi-presidential system, the prime minister also has key constitutional powers under article 21: "He shall be responsible for national defence" and has "power to make regulations and shall make appointments to civil and military posts".

==== Pre-1958 ====
Since the reign of Louis XIV, France has been strongly centralised. After crushing local nobles engaged in warlord-ism, the kings of France retained all authority with the help of able yet discreet Prime ministers (Mazarin, Richelieu).

The French Revolution transferred the supreme authority to the king (in the context of the short-lived constitutional monarchy), then to the multi-member Comité de Salut Public during the Convention, as well as later to the Directoire, before being regained in the hands of Consul Napoléon Bonaparte, later Emperor Napoléon I, alone.

The Restoration restored the authority of the king, first in an absolute monarchy, then the constitutional July Monarchy of Louis Philippe, before it was overthrown in turn by the Second Republic and later the Second Empire of Napoleon III.

The following Third Republic was a parliamentary system, where the military authority was held by the president of the Council of Ministers, head of government, although the president, head of state, retained ceremonial powers. During World War I, the many visits to the trenches by the elder statesman Georges Clemenceau impressed the soldiers and earned him the nickname Father of Victory (French: Le Père de la Victoire).

During World War II, Maréchal Philippe Pétain assumed power and held the supreme authority in Vichy France, while Général Charles de Gaulle, acting on behalf of the previous regime, founded the Free French Forces, upon which he held supreme authority all through the war.

The following and short-lived Fourth Republic was a parliamentary system, which was replaced by the present Fifth Republic, a semi-presidential system.

=== Germany ===
==== Federal Republic of Germany (1956–present) ====
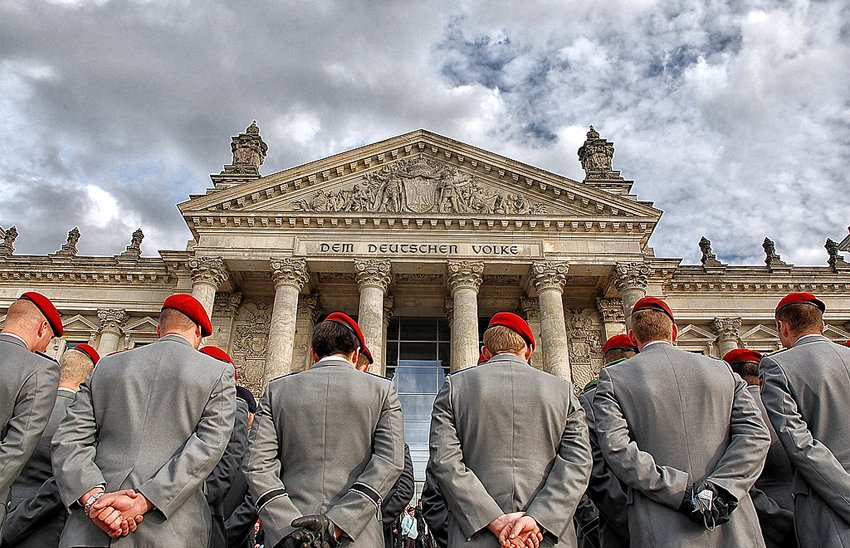
New recruits standing in front of the Reichstag building, before taking the Bundeswehr oath. In the light of German militarism and due to its infamous history of the 20th century; Germany of today puts a strong emphasis on having armed forces compatible with a parliamentary system.

Upon the re-militarization of West Germany in 1955, when it joined NATO, the Basic Law for the Federal Republic of Germany was amended in 1956 to include constitutional provisions for the command of the armed forces.

- In peacetime, under Article 65a, the federal minister of defence (German: Bundesminister der Verteidigung) holds the supreme command authority (German: Inhaber der Befehls- und Kommandogewalt - IBuK) over the Bundeswehr.
- If the Bundestag declares the state of defence (German: Verteidigungsfall), the Federal Chancellor, under Article 115b, assumes the command authority over the armed forces. As of 2023, this has never happened.
- The president of Germany has thus no role in the command of the forces, although he continues to receive the ceremonial honors due to his position as a head of state.

Placing the command authority over the armed forces directly with the responsible minister in charge of the military establishment breaks with the longstanding German constitutional tradition in both earlier monarchical and republican systems of placing it with the head of state. The rationale was that in a democratic parliamentary system the command authority should directly reside where it would be exercised and where it is subject to the parliamentary control of the Bundestag at all times. By assigning it directly to the responsible minister, instead of with the Federal Chancellor, this also meant that military affairs is but one of the many integrated responsibilities of the government; in stark contrast of earlier times when the separate division of the military establishment from the civil administration allowed the former to act as a state within a state (in contrast to the Federal Republic, the Weimar Republic began with the Ebert–Groener pact, which kept the military establishment as an autonomous force outside the control of politics; the 1925 election of Paul von Hindenburg as Reichspräsident, surrounded by his camarilla and the machinations of Kurt von Schleicher, did little to reverse the trend).

==== East Germany (1960–1990) ====
The legislature of the German Democratic Republic (GDR), the Volkskammer, enacted on 13 February 1960 the Law on the Formation of the National Defence Council of the GDR, which established a council consisting of a chairman and at least 12 members. This was later incorporated into the GDR Constitution in April 1968. The National Defence Council held the supreme command of the National People's Army (including the internal security forces), and the council's chairman (usually the General Secretary of the ruling Socialist Unity Party) was considered the GDR's commander-in-chief.

The GDR joined with the Federal Republic of Germany on 3 October 1990, upon which the GDR's constitution and armed forces were abolished.

==== German Reich (1871–1945) ====
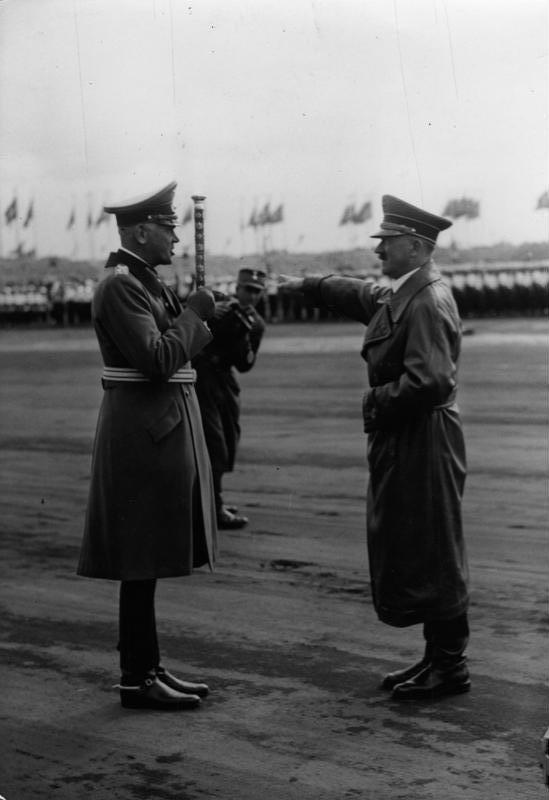
Werner von Blomberg (left) saluting Adolf Hitler (right) with a baton at the 1937 Nuremberg Rally.

During the Kingdom of Prussia, German Empire, Weimar Republic and the Nazi era, whoever was the head of state—the king of Prussia/German emperor (under the Constitution of the Kingdom of Prussia/Constitution of the German Empire) to 1918, the Reichspräsident (under the Weimar Constitution) to 1934, and the Führer from 1934 to 1945—was the head of the Armed Forces (German: Oberbefehlshaber: literally "Possessor of highest command").

Below the level of the head of state, each military branch (German: Teilstreitkraft) had its own head who reported directly to the head of state and held the highest rank in his service; in the Reichsheer - Generalfeldmarschall, and in the Reichsmarine - Grossadmiral.

After Chancellor Adolf Hitler assumed power as Führer (after the death of President Paul von Hindenburg), he would later grant his war minister, Generalfeldmarschall Werner von Blomberg, the title of Commander-in-Chief of the Armed Forces in 1935, when conscription was reintroduced. However, in 1938 due to the Blomberg–Fritsch Affair, Hitler withdrew the commander-in-chief title, abolished the war ministerial post and assumed personal command of the Armed Forces. The war ministerial post was de facto overtaken by the Oberkommando der Wehrmacht, which was headed by Generalfeldmarschall Wilhelm Keitel until the German surrender.

=== Ghana ===
According to the Constitution of Ghana, the president of Ghana is the commander-in-chief of the Ghana Armed Forces. He holds the rank of Field Marshal.

=== Greece ===
According to Article 45 of the Greek Constitution, the president is the head of the Greek Armed Forces, but their administration is exercised by the government. The prime minister, the minister for national defence and the chief of the general staff are the ones who command the Armed Forces.

=== Guyana ===
According to the Guyanese constitution, the president is commander-in-chief of the Armed Forces. There is a rank insignia for the position.

=== India ===
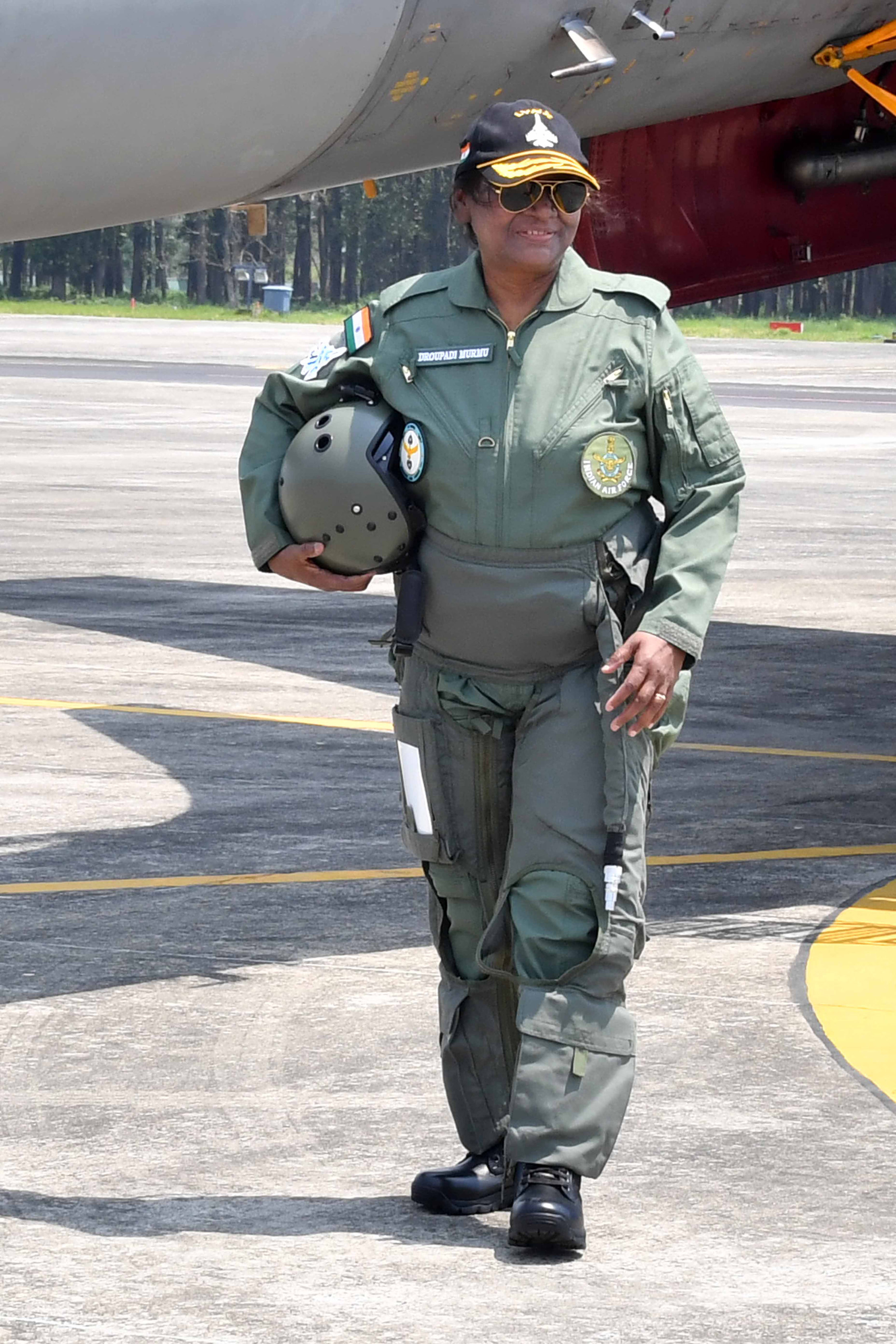
President Droupadi Murmu of India

The supreme commander of the Indian Armed Forces is the principal commanding authority of the Indian Armed Forces, a position that is vested in the head of state, the president of the Republic, in accordance to Article 53 of the Constitution of India.

The president exercises supreme command with accordance to the law. As commander in chief, the president has the power to declare war however they must subject to the approval of the Parliament of India. The commander in chief also appoints the chiefs of each branch of the armed forces as well as the Chairman Chiefs of Staff Committee with the advice of the Minister of Defence.

Whilst the constitution names the president as the de jure commander in chief, executive command authority is exercised de facto by the prime minister and their Union Council of Ministers.

On 15 August 1947, each service was placed under its own commander-in-chief. In 1955, the three service chiefs were re-designated as the chief of the Army staff (rank of general), the chief of the naval staff (rank of vice admiral) and the chief of the air staff (rank of air marshal) with the president as the supreme commander. The chief of the air staff was raised to the rank of air chief marshal in 1965 and the chief of the naval staff raised to the rank of admiral in 1968. Starting from 1 January 2020, all the three chiefs of staff report to the newly formed chief of defence staff.

=== Indonesia ===
According to article 10 of the Constitution of Indonesia, the president of Indonesia holds the supreme command of the Indonesian National Armed Forces. Day-to-day operations of the Armed Forces is handled by the commander of the Armed Forces (Indonesian: Panglima TNI), a 4-star officer whom can be a general (Army or Marine), an admiral (Navy), or an air chief marshal (Air Force). The commander of the Armed Forces is appointed by the president from active chiefs of staff (Army, Navy, or Air Force) and must get approval from the House of Representatives. The chief of staff is also appointed by the president from senior military officers. The president as commander-in-chief also has authority in senior military officer mutation and promotion in tour of duty. The minister of defense has responsibility to assist the president in defense issues and create policies about authorization use of military force, manage defense budget, etc. According to article 11 of the Constitution, for authorization use of military forces or declaration of war, the president must get approval from House of Representatives. The commander of the Armed Forces gives recommendations to the minister of defense in creating national defense policies.

=== Iran ===
Before 1979, the shah was the commander-in-chief in Iran. After the inception of the Islamic Republic, the president of Iran was initially appointed that task, with Abolhassan Bani Sadr being the first commander-in-chief. However, Abolhassan Bani Sadr was impeached on 22 June 1981. It was after this event that the role of commander-in-chief of the Armed Forces of the Islamic Republic of Iran was given to the Supreme Leader of Iran.

=== Iraq ===
In pre-war Iraq, the commander-in-chief was the head of state, i.e. the president. In the current constitution, the commander-in-chief of the Iraqi Armed Forces is the prime minister, and the president only retains a ceremonial and honorary role of awarding medals and decorations on the recommendation of the commander-in-chief.

=== Ireland ===
From 1922-24, the first three Irish commanders-in-chief were Generals Michael Collins, Richard Mulcahy and Eoin O'Duffy in succession. The Ministers and Secretaries Acts, 1924 assigned the title of commander-in-chief to the Minister for Defence as the chairman of the Council of Defence. The title was removed by the Defence Act, 1954. Since 1937, the supreme commander of the Irish Defence Forces is the President of Ireland, but in practice the Minister for Defence acts on the President's behalf and reports to the Government of Ireland. The Minister for Defence is advised by the Council of Defence on the business of the Department of Defence.

=== Israel ===
In Israel, the applicable basic law states that the ultimate authority over the Israel Defense Forces rests with the Government of Israel (chaired by the prime minister) as a collective body. The authority of the government is exercised by the minister of defense on behalf of the Government. However, the commander-in-chief of the IDF is the chief of general staff who, despite being subordinate to the minister of defense, holds the highest level of command within the military.

During the consideration of Basic Law: President of the State, it was proposed to confer "the supreme command of the armed forces of the State of Israel" on the President of the State, but this proposal was ultimately not adopted.

=== Italy ===
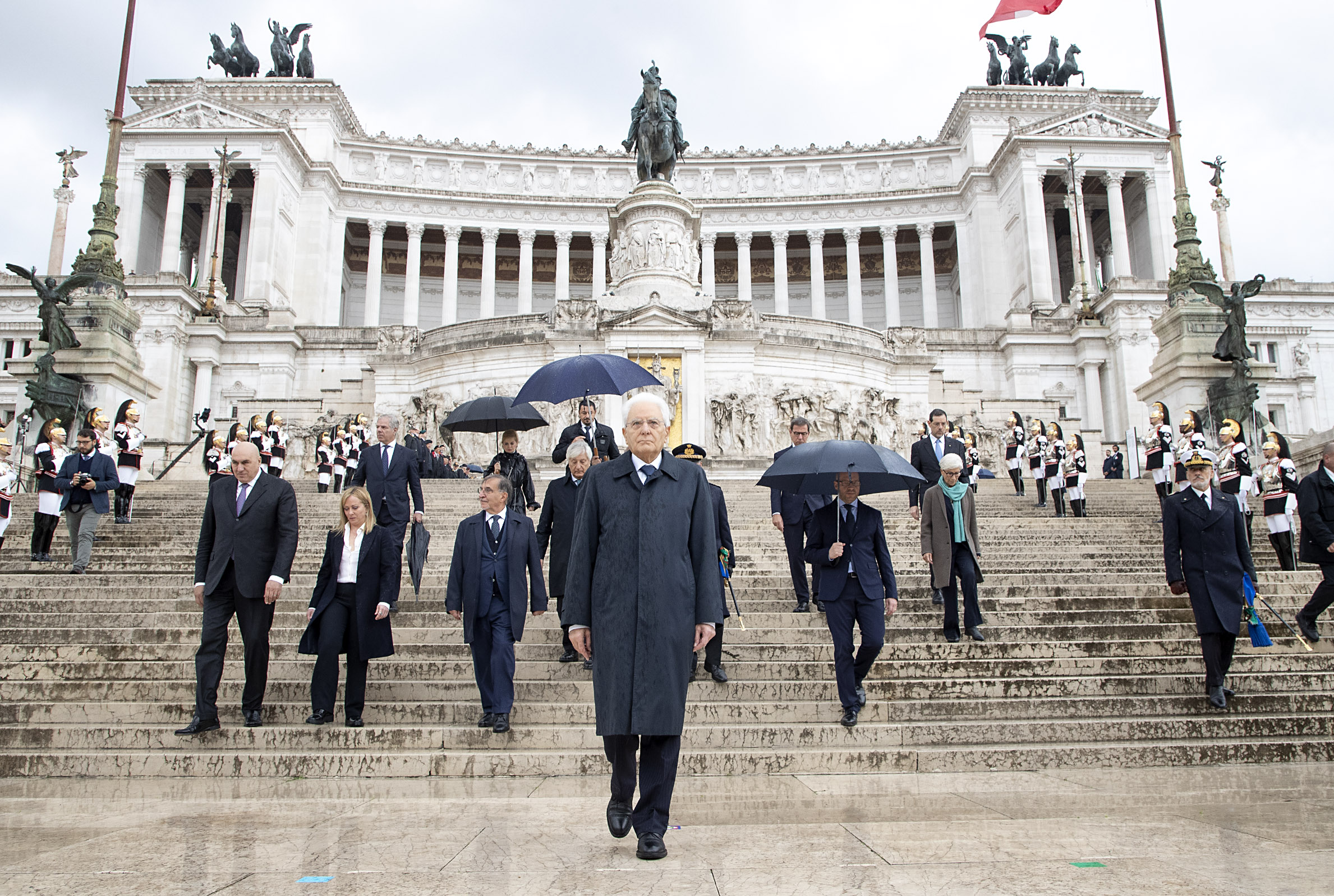
President of Italian Republic Sergio Mattarella lays a laurel wreath on the Tomb of the Unknown Soldier in Rome, 2022.

The Constitution of Italy, in article 87, states that the president of the Republic: "is the commander of the armed forces and chairman of the supreme defence council constituted by law, although effective executive power and responsibility for national defence resides with the government headed by the President of the Council of Ministers; the president declares war according to the decision of the parliament".

=== Japan ===
In Japan, prior to the Meiji Restoration the role of the commander-in-chief was vested in the shōgun (the most militarily powerful samurai daimyō). After the dissolution of the Tokugawa shogunate, the role of the commander-in-chief resided with the Emperor of Japan. The present-day constitutional role of the emperor is that of a ceremonial figurehead. The current Japanese constitution describes the emperor as "the symbol of the State and of the unity of the People," without any military role.

After Japan's move towards democracy, the position of commander-in-chief of the Japan Self-Defense Forces is held by the prime minister of Japan. Military authority runs from the prime minister to the cabinet-level minister of defense of the Japanese Ministry of Defense.

=== Kazakhstan ===
The Supreme Commander-in-Chief of the Armed Forces of the Republic of Kazakhstan is the President of Kazakhstan, who carries out general management of the construction, preparation and use of the military organization, ensuring the military security of the state.

=== Kenya ===
Chapter 131 of the Constitution of Kenya identifies the president as the commander-in-chief of the Kenya Defence Forces and the chairperson of the National Security Council. There is a rank for the position. The president appoints a chief of general staff, known as the Chief of the Kenya Defence Forces, who acts as the principal military adviser to the president and the National Security Council. The Chief of the Kenya Defence Forces is drawn from one of the branches of the Armed Forces, the Kenya Army, the Kenya Navy or the Kenya Air Force.

=== Latvia ===
In accordance with Article 42 of the Constitution of Latvia, the president of Latvia is Commander-in-Chief of the Latvian National Armed Forces. The president may appoint a chief military commander in times of war.

=== Malaysia ===
In accordance with Article 41 of the Federal Constitution of Malaysia, the King of Malaysia is Supreme Commander of the Malaysian Armed Forces and holds the rank of Field Marshal and Admiral of the Fleet. As such, he is the highest-ranking officer in the military establishment, with the power to appoint the Chief of Staff (on the advice of the Armed Forces Council). He also appoints the service heads of each of the three branches of the military.

The Federal Constitution establishes that the office of Supreme Commander is attached to the person of the King of Malaysia as the Federation's head of state:

- Federal Constitution, Article 41 - The Yang di-Pertuan Agong (King) shall be the Supreme Commander of the Armed Forces of the Federation.

The Federal Parliament passed the Federal Armed Forces Act to consolidate in one law all regulations that govern the three services (Army, Navy, and Air Force). It establishes the function and duties of the Federal Head of State in the capacity as Supreme Commander.

=== Malta ===
The Malta Armed Forces Act does not directly establish the president of Malta as the supreme commander of the Armed Forces. However, Maltese law allows the president to raise by voluntary enlistment and maintain an armed force. Likewise, the law allows the president to issue orders in order to the administrate the armed forces.

The Armed Forces do not swear allegiance to the president of Malta, but rather to the Republic of Malta. On this basis, there is no direct link between the head of state and the armed forces. For this reason, this link is mediated by the minister responsible for defence.

Nonetheless, the Presidential Palaces are guarded by the Armed Forces as a symbolic gesture of social cohesion.

=== Myanmar ===
5-stars Flag-Insignia of Commander-in-Chief of Tatmadaw

In Myanmar, the Commander-in-Chief of Defence Services (Tatmadaw) is the commanding officer of the national military (Defence Services), and is a position vested in a military officer who holds the rank of Senior General, not the president. The commander-in-chief is, however, a member of the National Defence and Security Council and reports to the president. The commander-in-chief is assisted in his/her role by the Deputy Commander-in-Chief of Defence Services.

=== Mexico ===
Section VI of Article 89 of the Constitution states that the president of the United Mexican States shall "Preserve national security, in accordance with the respective law, and dispose of the full permanent Armed Force, that is to say the Army, the Navy and the Air Force, for the interior security and exterior defense of the Federation".

Both the Organic Law of the Mexican Army and Air Force and the Organic Law of the Mexican Navy clearly state the president of the Republic is "Supreme Commander of the Armed Forces". The President is ex officio the only five-star general of Mexico.

The Constitution also grants the president freedom to appoint and remove the secretary of the Navy and the secretary of national defense.

=== Netherlands ===
Flag of the minister of defence, the primary responsible official

The Constitution of the Netherlands states, in article 97, that "the Government shall have supreme authority over the armed forces". Article 42 defines the Government as the Monarch and the ministers, and that only ministers are responsible for acts of government. Article 45 further defines the ministers as constituting the Cabinet, chaired by the prime minister, with "authority to decide upon overall government policy".

Before the constitution change in 1983, the equivalent section stated that: "The King shall have supreme authority over the armed forces". Nevertheless, the role of the monarch as commander in chief was ceremonial as in most European constitutional monarchies. As a consequence of being only part of the government, monarchs of the Netherlands do not hold a military rank. The current king of the Netherlands Willem-Alexander of the Netherlands resigned from his military ranks (equivalent to one-star general in all branches) upon becoming king in 2013. He has been provided with royal insignia to show his lasting commitment to the armed forces, but these represent no formal rank.

The minister of defence has the primary ministerial responsibility for the armed forces, which are formally a part of the Ministry of Defence. The chief of defence is the highest ranked professional military officer, and serves as an intermediary between the minister of defence and the Armed Forces, and is responsible to the minister for military-strategic planning, operations and deployment of the Armed Forces.

=== New Zealand ===
Both the Monarch of New Zealand and their representative, the governor-general, constitutionally serve as the supreme authority in defence matters in New Zealand. The position of commander-in-chief is vested in the sovereign by the constitution. In practice however, the position of the commander-in-chief is largely ceremonial, with the governor-general primarily serving as a "patron of the New Zealand Defence Force". The governor-general exercises their authority as commander-in-chief on the advice of the minister of defence or other ministers of the New Zealand Government.

The Letter Patents 1983 consolidated the roles of governor-general and commander-in-chief into one office, with its compounded title being the Governor-General and Commander-in-Chief. The governor-general's is statutorily defined in the Defence Act 1990. Sections five and six of the Defence Act 1990 outlines the governor-general's authority to raise and maintain armed forces.

=== Nigeria ===
In accordance with the Nigerian Constitution, the president of Nigeria is the commander-in-chief of the Nigerian Armed Forces.

=== North Korea ===
Flag of the supreme commander of North Korea (2002–2020)

Article 47 of the Rules of the Workers' Party of Korea stipulates that the Korean People's Army is "Revolutionary Armed Forces of the Workers' Party of Korea" and "Korean People's Army conducts all military and political activities under the leadership of the Party." Article 30 invests commanding authority to the Party Central Military Commission, whose ex officio chair is the General Secretary of the Workers' Party of Korea.

Article 103 of the Constitution of North Korea designates the President of the State Affairs Commission, as the country's head of state and commander-in-chief of the armed forces.

Currently both offices are occupied by Kim Jong Un. Since 2018, he started issuing orders in the name of the Chairman of the Central Military Commission, instead of the Supreme Commander.

=== Norway ===
Haakon VIII, King of Norway, officially retains executive power. Article 25 of the constitution states: "The King is commander-in-chief of the armed forces of the realm".

However, following the introduction of a parliamentary system of government, the duties of the monarch have since become strictly representative and ceremonial, such as the formal appointment and dismissal of the prime minister and other ministers in the executive government. Accordingly, the Monarch is commander-in-chief of the Norwegian Armed Forces, and serves as chief diplomatic official abroad and as a symbol of unity.

=== Pakistan ===
In Pakistan, before the 1973 Constitution, the head of the army, was known as the commander-in-chief of the Pakistan Army, heads of the navy and the air force were also titled as "Commander-in-Chief". The head of army term was replaced to "Chief of Army Staff" on 20 March 1972 during military reforms The chief of staff is a four-star officer whose term is 3 years, but can be extended or renewed once. After 1973 constitution The chief of Army/Air/Naval staff is chosen by the prime minister of Pakistan and appointed by the president of Pakistan as commander in chief of Pakistan Armed Forces. So, the president of Pakistan is the commander-in-chief.

=== Philippines ===
The president of the Philippines is both head of state and head of government, and is mandated by Article VII, Section 18 of the 1987 Constitution to be commander-in-chief of the Armed Forces.

=== Poland ===
The president of Poland is the supreme commander (Polish: najwyższy zwierzchnik) of the Polish Armed Forces according to the Constitution and in times of peace exercises their authority through Minister of National Defence. However, the art. 134 ust. 4 of the constitution states:

The President of the Republic, for a period of war, shall appoint the Commander-in-Chief of the Armed Forces on request of the Prime Minister. He may dismiss the Commander-in-Chief of the Armed Forces in accordance with the same procedure. The authority of the Commander-in-Chief of the Armed Forces, as well as the principle of his subordination to the constitutional organs of the Republic of Poland, shall be specified by statute.

During the interbellum period, the General Inspector of the Armed Forces was appointed the commander-in-chief for the time of war (Supreme Commander of the Armed Forces). However, after the war this function ceased to exist—thus it is likely that if Poland formally participates in a war, the chief of the general staff of the Polish Armed Forces will be appointed supreme commander.

=== Portugal ===
The president of the Portuguese Republic is the constitutional supreme commander of the Armed Forces (in Portuguese: Comandante Supremo das Forças Armadas). However, the operational command is delegated in the chief of the general staff of the Armed Forces.

In the Portuguese military parlance, the term "Commander-in-Chief" (in Portuguese: comandante-em-chefe or simply comandante-chefe) refers to the unified military commander of all the land, naval and air forces in a theater of operations.

=== Russia ===
==== Imperial ====
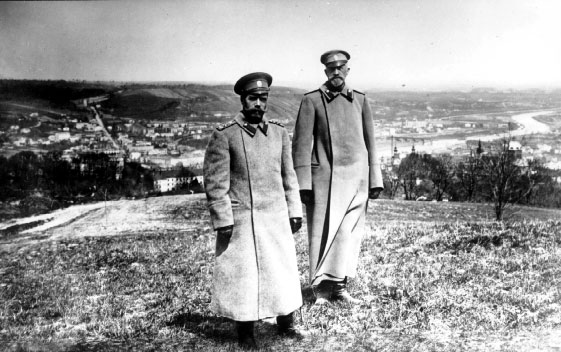
Emperor Nicholas II and Grand Duke Nikolai Nikolaevich during a review of the fortifications of the Przemysl Fortress, April 11, 1915

The All-Russian Emperor, according to Article 14 of the Basic Laws of the Russian Empire, was the "sovereign leader" of the Russian Armed Forces, he possessed the supreme command over all land and naval armed forces of the Russian state and the exclusive right to issue decrees and orders "to everything generally related to the organization of the armed forces and defence of the Russian State", as well as the establishment of restrictions on the right of residence and the acquisition of real estate in the localities that make up the fortress areas and strongholds for the army and navy. The emperor declared areas of martial law or exceptional status (Article 15).

At the same time, the legislation of the Russian Empire allowed the existence of this position as separate from the position of the head of state. Thus, the provision on field command and control of troops in wartime provided that "The supreme command over all land and naval forces intended for military operations shall be entrusted to the supreme commander-in-chief, if the sovereign does not deign to lead the troops personally" (Article 6), such was appointed "by direct the election of the sovereign "(that is, independently by the Emperor, and not by anyone's recommendation) by the highest order and decree of the Senate. The supreme commander-in-chief was defined as "the supreme commander of all land and naval armed forces intended for military action" (Article 17), was responsible only to the Emperor and was subordinate only to him (Article 20). In the theater of operations, his orders had the same force as the Imperial commands (Article 17). The commander-in-chief of the Russian Armed Forces could, "if military circumstances have it", conclude and terminate an armistice with the enemy, immediately informing the Emperor about it, but if the armistice or its termination does not seem "urgently necessary", then he should have obtained the Emperor's consent before his conclusion and termination (Article 25), but he could not enter into peace negotiations without a special order from the Emperor (Article 26).

For the first time in Russian history, this position was replaced on July 20, 1914. Grand Duke Nikolai Nikolaevich Junior was appointed to it.

Not recognizing that it is possible, for reasons of a general state nature, to become now at the head of our land and sea forces intended for military operations, we recognized for the benefit of all the most merciful order to our Adjutant general, Commander-in-Chief of the Guards and the Petersburg Military District, General of Cavalry, His Imperial Highness the Grand Duke Nikolai Nikolaevich to be the Supreme Commander-in-Chief.

— The personal imperial decree of the Emperor Nicholas II, given to the Governing Senate on July 20, 1914

==== First World War ====
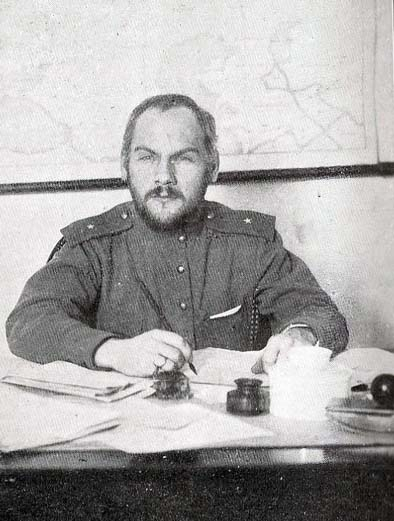
Nikolai Krylenko, the last supreme commander-in-chief of the Russian Army

During the First World War, this position was held by:

- Adjutant General, General of the Cavalry, Grand Duke Nikolai Nikolaevich (July 20, 1914 – August 23, 1915);
- Emperor Nicholas II (August 23, 1915 – March 2, 1917);

On March 2, 1917, Nicholas II, before his abdication, appointed Grand Duke Nikolai Nikolaevich as supreme commander-in-chief. The Grand Duke arrived at the Headquarters in Mogilev, but after a meeting with Mikhail Alekseev, who was appointed commander-in-chief by the decree of the Provisional Government, he was forced to "give up" this post.

- Adjutant General, General of the Cavalry, Grand Duke Nikolai Nikolaevich (March 2–9, 1917);
- Infantry General Mikhail Alekseev (March 11, 1917 – May 21, 1917);
- Cavalry General Alexei Brusilov (May 22, 1917 – July 19, 1917);
- Infantry General Lavr Kornilov (July 19, 1917 – August 27, 1917);

After the removal of Kornilov from the post of Supreme Commander-in-Chief, Kerensky offered this position to Lieutenant general Alexander Lukomsky and Infantry General Vladislav Klembovsky, but both of these military leaders refused Kerensky's offer.

- Minister-Chairman of the Provisional Government Alexander Kerensky (August 30, 1917 – November 3, 1917);
- Lieutenant general Nikolay Dukhonin (November 3, 1917 – November 20, 1917) (acting);
- Ensign Nikolai Krylenko (November 20, 1917 – March 5, 1918).

In connection with the reorganization of the management of the army and navy, after the signing of the Brest Peace Treaty by the Bolsheviks, the post of the Supreme Commander-in-Chief was abolished.

In accordance with the governing documents of that period, the supreme commander-in-chief controlled only the active army and navy.

==== During the Civil War ====
Supreme Commanders-in-Chief of the Armed Forces of Soviet Russia:

- Joachim Vatsetis (September 1, 1918 – July 9, 1919);
- Sergey Kamenev (July 9, 1919 – April 28, 1924). From August 28, 1923 – Commander-in-Chief of the Armed Forces of the Soviet Union.

In connection with the transition from collegial management of the army to a centralised one, the post of the commander-in-chief was eliminated.

Supreme Commanders-in-Chief of the Armed Forces of the Russian State:

- Lieutenant general Vasily Boldyrev (September 24, 1918 – November 18, 1918).
- Admiral Alexander Kolchak (November 18, 1918 – January 4, 1920).

After the arrest and execution of Kolchak, the Supreme Command formally passed to Anton Denikin.

==== Modern ====
Flag of the supreme commander-in-chief of the Russian Armed Forces

According to the Constitution of the Russian Federation, (Chapter 4, Article 87, Section 1) the president is the Supreme Commander-in-Chief of the Armed Forces.

On May 7, 1992, the President of the Russian Federation Boris Yeltsin issued Decree No. 467 "On Assuming the Office of the Supreme Commander-in-Chief of the Armed Forces of the Russian Federation". The powers of the President as the Supreme Commander-in-Chief are enshrined in the Law of the Russian Federation No. 4061–I "On Amendments and Additions to the Constitution (Basic Law) of the Russian Federation – Russia" dated December 9, 1992, which entered into force from the moment of publication in the "Rossiyskaya Gazeta" on January 12, 1993. On December 25, 1993, the Constitution of the Russian Federation came into force, which confirmed the status of the Supreme Commander-in-Chief for the President of the Russian Federation.

- Boris Yeltsin (May 7, 1992 – December 31, 1999);
  - Viktor Chernomyrdin (November 5, 1996 – November 6, 1996);
- Vladimir Putin (December 31, 1999 – May 7, 2008, and from May 7, 2012);
- Dmitry Medvedev (May 7, 2008 – May 7, 2012).

The president approves the military doctrine and appoints the defence minister and the chief and other members of the general staff.

The Russian Armed Forces is divided into three services: the Russian Ground Forces, the Russian Navy, and the Russian Aerospace Forces. In addition there are two independent arms of service: Strategic Missile Troops, and the Russian Airborne Forces. The Air Defence Troops, the former Soviet Air Defence Forces, have been subordinated into the Air Force since 1998.

=== Rwanda ===
According to the Constitution of Rwanda, the president of Rwanda is the commander-in-chief of Rwanda Defence Forces.

=== Saudi Arabia ===
Article 60 of the Basic Law of Saudi Arabia states: "The King is the commander-in-chief of all the Military Forces. He appoints officers and puts an end to their duties in accordance with the law."

Article 61 further states: "The King declares a state of emergency, general mobilization and war, and the law defines the rules for this."

Lastly, Article 62 states: "If there is a danger threatening the safety of the Kingdom or its territorial integrity, or the security of its people and its interests, or which impedes the functioning of the state institutions, the King may take urgent measures in order to deal with this danger And if the King considers that these measures should continue, he may then implement the necessary regulations to this end."

=== Serbia ===
In accordance with the law, the president of Serbia is the commander-in-chief of Armed Forces and in command of the military. He appoints, promotes and recalls officers of the Armed Forces of Serbia.

=== Slovenia ===
In Slovenia, the commander-in-chief is formally the president of Slovenia. In peacetime, the role of commander in chief is usually assumed by the minister of defence.

=== South Africa ===
Chapter 11, section 202(1) of the Constitution of South Africa states that the president of South Africa is the commander-in-chief of the South African National Defence Force. The constitution places conditions on when and how that power may be employed and requires regular reports to the Parliament of South Africa.

=== South Korea ===
In accordance with the Constitution of the Republic of Korea, the commander-in-chief and the supreme authority on all military matters is the president of South Korea.

=== Soviet Union ===
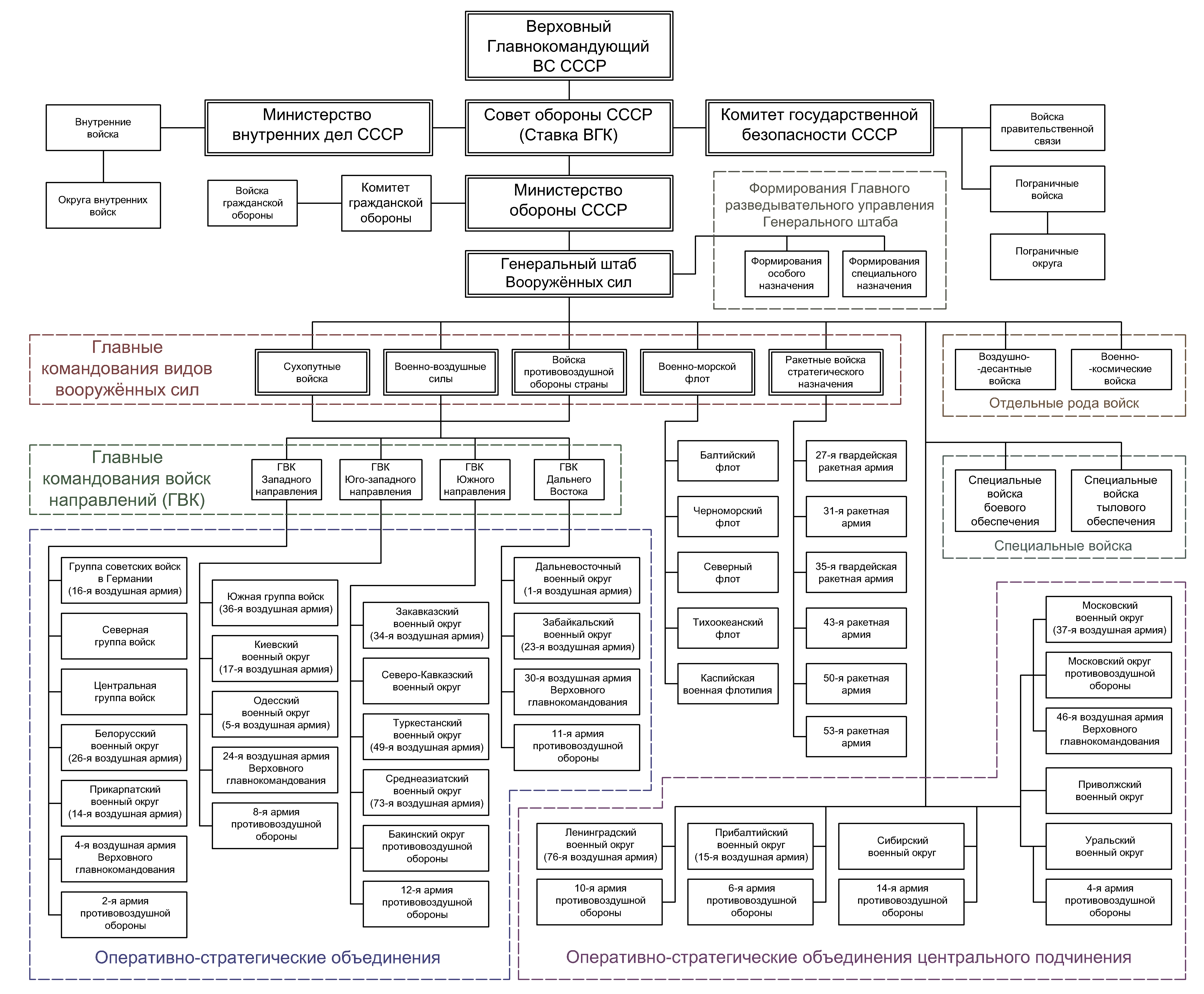
The scheme of command and control of the Armed Forces of the Soviet Union at the beginning of 1989 (unofficial)

In the Soviet Union, the supreme commander-in-chief was vested with extraordinary power in relation to all civilian institutions and persons on the territory of a given state and the theater of military operations (theater of war).

On August 8, 1941, during the Great Patriotic War, Joseph Stalin was appointed the Supreme Commander-in-Chief of the Armed Forces of the Soviet Union. Joseph Stalin continued to hold this position in peacetime.

In 1955–1990, the Chairman of the Defence Council of the Soviet Union was unofficially called the Supreme Commander-in-Chief. The officeholders were always the General Secretary of the Communist Party of the Soviet Union.

By the Law of the Soviet Union, dated March 14, 1990, No. 1360–I, Chapter 15.1 "President of the Soviet Union" was introduced into the Constitution of the Soviet Union and, in accordance with it, the President of the Soviet Union was the Supreme Commander-in-Chief of the Armed Forces of the Soviet Union.

On March 15, 1990, Mikhail Gorbachev was elected first President of the Soviet Union, who became the supreme commander-in-chief for the highest office in the Union.

On December 25, 1991, the President of the Soviet Union (before resigning) issued Presidential Decree No. 3162 "On the Resignation by the President of the Soviet Union of the Powers of the Supreme Commander-in-Chief of the Armed Forces of the Soviet Union and the Abolition of the Defence Council Under the President of the Soviet Union", which stated "In connection with the resignation I resign from the post of President of the Soviet Union the powers of the Supreme Commander-in-Chief of the Armed Forces of the Soviet Union".

=== Spain ===
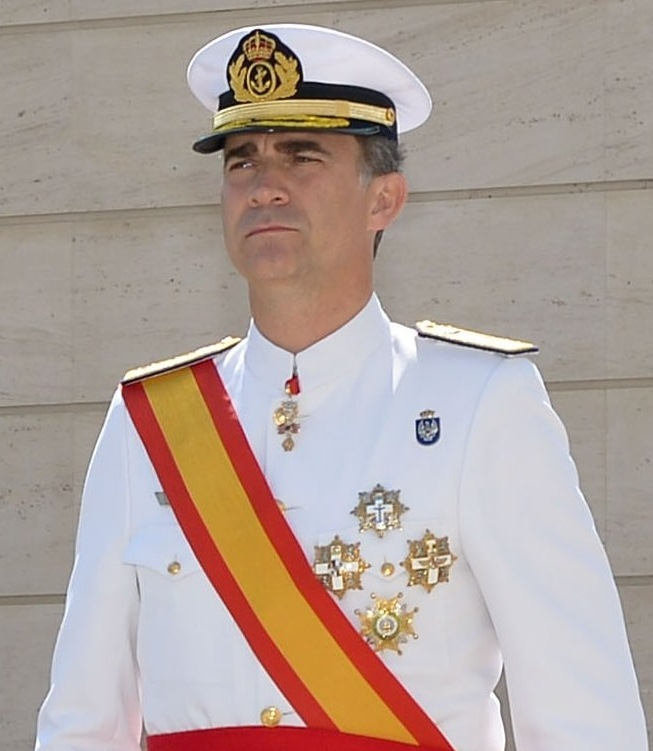
King Felipe VI in uniform of Captain General of the Navy at the Naval NCO Academy in 2014.

As with most remaining European monarchies, the position of the Spanish monarch as the nominal head of the armed forces is deeply rooted in tradition.

The Spanish Constitution of 1978 authorises the king in article 62 (h):

to exercise supreme command of the Armed Forces

The king regularly chairs sessions of the National Security Council, the Joint Chiefs of staff and the individual general staffs of each branch of the Armed Forces in his capacity as supreme commander.

All promotions to military rank and positions in the high command of the armed forces are made by Royal decree signed by the king and the minister of defence

However, article 64 require that all official acts of the king must be countersigned, by the president of the Government or other competent minister, for them to become valid. This counter/signature is used to limit a possible abuse of power by any single individual.

This constitutional provision can and has been made the subject of an exception in crisis situations.

In 1981 the king as supreme commander of the armed forces assumed direct command in order to put down a military coup attempt. All members of the government were at that time trapped/held hostage in Parliament and were unable to counter sign the kings orders. This did not however result in those orders being ruled unenforceable or unconstitutional. The coup collapsed after the king ordered all army units to leave the streets and return to their barracks. Furthermore, article 97 stipulates that;

The Government shall conduct domestic and foreign policy, civil and military administration and the defence of the State

No provision in the constitution requires the king/government to seek approval from the Cortes Generales before sending the armed forces abroad.

Since 1984, the chief of the defence staff is the professional head of the armed forces and, under the authority of the minister of defence, is responsible for military operations and military organisation.

=== Sri Lanka ===
As head of state, the president of Sri Lanka, is nominally the commander-in-chief of the armed forces. The National Security Council, chaired by the president is the authority charged with formulating and executing defence policy for the nation. The highest level of military headquarters is the Ministry of Defence, since 1978 except for a few rare occasions the president retained the portfolio defence, thus being the minister of defence. The ministry and the armed forces have been controlled by the during these periods by either a minister of state, deputy minister for defence, and of recently the permanent secretary to the Ministry of Defence. Prior to 1978 the prime minister held the portfolio of minister of defence and external affairs, and was supported by a parliamentary secretary for defence and external affairs.

Responsibility for the management of the forces is Ministry of Defence, while the planning and execution of combined operations is the responsibility of the Joint Operations Command (JOC). The JOC is headed by the chief of the defence staff who is the most senior officer in the Armed Forces and is an appointment that can be held by an air chief marshal, admiral, or general. The three services have their own respective professional chiefs: the commander of the Army, the commander of the Navy and the commander of the Air Force, who have much autonomy.

=== Suriname ===
In Suriname, the constitution gives the president "supreme authority over the armed forces and all of its members".

=== Sweden ===
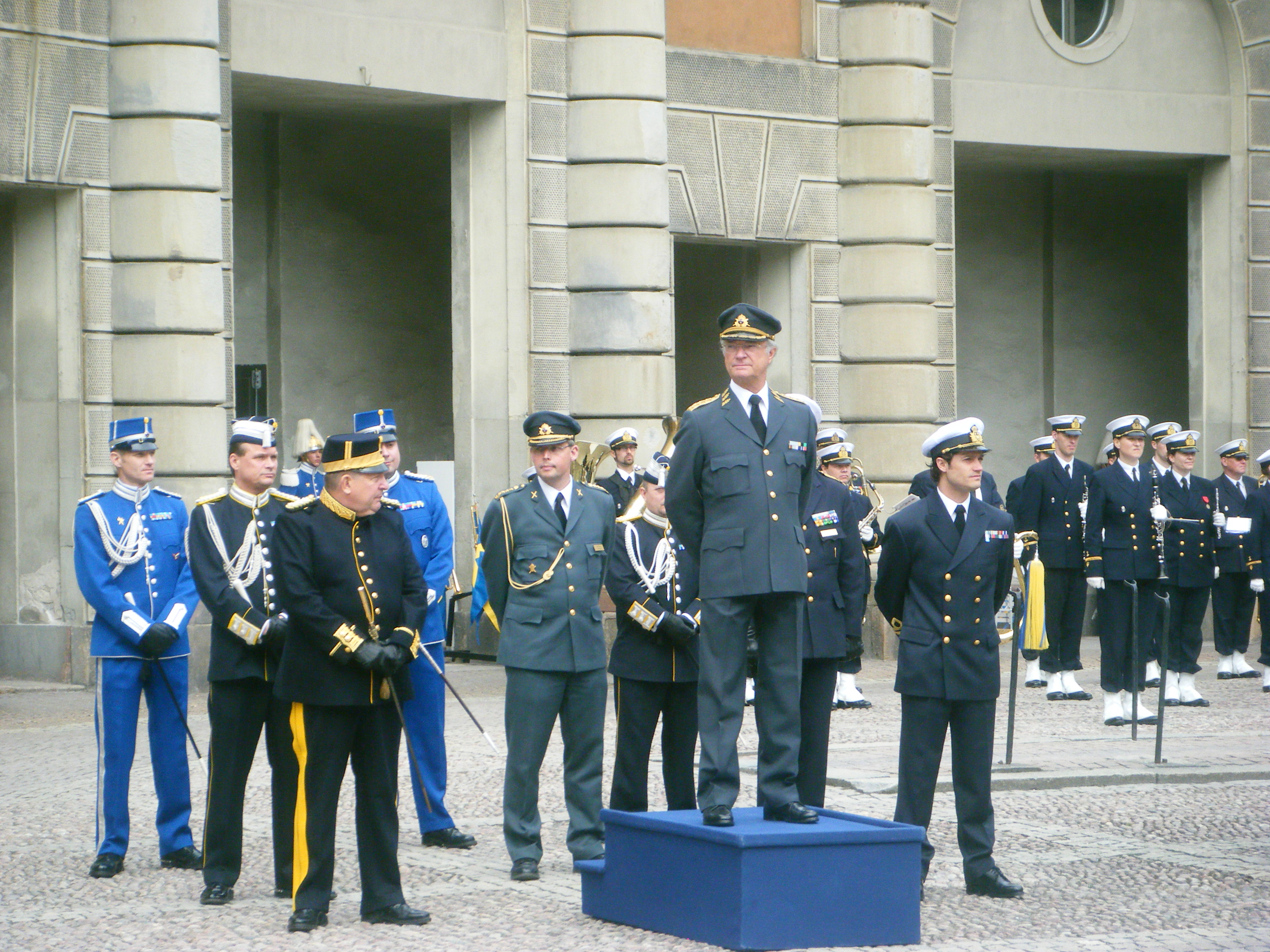
The Swedish monarch (King Carl XVI Gustaf) is no longer the commander-in-chief of the Swedish Armed Forces, although he continues to receive treatment befitting a head of state.

In Sweden, with the Ordinance of Alsnö in 1280, nobles were exempted from land taxation if they provided cavalrymen to the king's service. Following the Swedish War of Liberation (1521–23) from the Kalmar Union, a Guards Regiment was formed under the King and from there the modern Swedish Army has its roots. During the age of the Swedish Empire, several kings—Gustavus Adolphus the Great, Charles X Gustav, Charles XI & Charles XII—personally led their forces into battle. Under the Instrument of Government of 1809, which was in force until the current Instrument of Government of 1974 went into force on 1 January 1975; the monarch was in §§ 14-15 explicitly designated as the commander-in-chief of the Swedish Armed Forces (Swedish: Högste befälhavare).

At present, the Government (Swedish: Regeringen) as a collective body, chaired and formed by the prime minister of Sweden, holds the highest Executive Authority, subject to the will of the Riksdag; and is thus the present day closest equivalent of a command-in-chief, although not explicitly designated as such. The reason for this change was, apart from the fact that the king was since 1917 no longer expected to make political decisions without ministerial advice, that the new Instrument of Government was intended to be made as descriptive on the workings of the State as possible, and reflective on how decisions are actually made. Minister of Justice Lennart Geijer further remarked in the government bill that any continued pretensions of royal involvement in government decisions would be of a "fictitious nature" and "highly unsatisfactory".

Certain government decisions regarding the Armed Forces (Swedish: Särskilda regeringsbeslut) may be delegated to the minister for defence, under the supervision of the prime minister and to the extent laid down in ordinances.

To add to some confusion to the above, until 2024, the title of the agency head of the Swedish Armed Forces and highest ranked commissioned officer on active duty, was supreme commander of the Swedish Armed Forces (Swedish: Överbefälhavaren). In 2024, this title was changed to Chief of Defence, as a consequence of Sweden's accession to NATO.

However, the Monarch (as of present King Carl XVI Gustaf), is still a four-star general and admiral à la suite in the Swedish Army, Navy and Air Force and is by unwritten convention regarded as the foremost head and representative of the Swedish Armed Forces. The king has, as part of his court, a military staff. The military staff is headed by a senior officer (usually a general or admiral, retired from active service) and is composed of active duty military officers serving as aides to the king and his family.

=== Switzerland ===
The epaulet for the wartime-only office and rank of General.

Supreme authority over the military belongs to the Federal Council, which is the Swiss collegial head of state. Notwithstanding the previous sentence, under the Constitution, the Federal Council can only, in the operational sense, command a maximum of 4,000 soldiers, with a time limit of three weeks of mobilisation. For it to field more service personnel, the Federal Assembly must elect a General who is given four stars. Thus, the General is elected by the Federal Assembly to give him the same democratic legitimacy as the Federal Council.

In peacetime, the Armed Forces are led by the Chief of the Armed Forces (Chef der Armee), who reports to the head of the Federal Department of Defence, Civil Protection and Sports and to the Federal Council as a whole. The Chief of the Armed Forces has the rank of Korpskommandant or Commandant de corps (OF-8 in NATO equivalence).

In a time of declared war or national emergency, however, the Federal Assembly, assembled as the United Federal Assembly, specifically for the purpose of taking on the war-time responsibilities elect a General as commander-in-chief of the Armed Forces under Article 168 of the Constitution. Whilst the General acts as the highest military authority with a high degree of autonomy, he is still subordinate to the Federal Council (See Articles 58, 60, 174, 177, 180 & 185). The Federal Assembly retains the sole power to dismiss the General, but the General remains subordinate to the Federal Council by the council's ability to demobilise, thereby making the position of General redundant.

Four generals were appointed in Swiss history, General Henri Dufour during the Swiss Civil War, General Hans Herzog during the Franco-Prussian War, General Ulrich Wille during the First World War, and General Henri Guisan during the Second World War ("la Mob", "the Mobilisation"). Although Switzerland remained neutral during the latter three conflicts, the threat of having its territory used as a battlefield by the much bigger war parties of Germany and France required mobilization of the army.

=== Syria ===
In Syria, Article 32 of the constitutional declaration states that the president is the “Supreme Commander of the Army and Armed Forces” and is responsible for managing the country’s affairs, preserving its territorial integrity and security, and protecting the interests of the people.

=== Taiwan ===
As stipulated in the Constitution of the Republic of China, the president is also the commander-in-chief of the ROC Armed Forces.

=== Tajikistan ===
The President of the Republic of Tajikistan is the Supreme Commander-in-Chief of the Armed Forces of Tajikistan.

=== Thailand ===
The "head of the Thai Armed Forces" (Thai: จอมทัพไทย; RTGS: Chom Thap Thai) is a position vested in the Thai monarch, (Note: Most recently held by King Bhumibol Adulyadej until his death in October 2016, and now by King Vajiralongkorn.) who as sovereign and head of state is the commander-in-chief of the Royal Thai Armed Forces.

=== Turkey ===
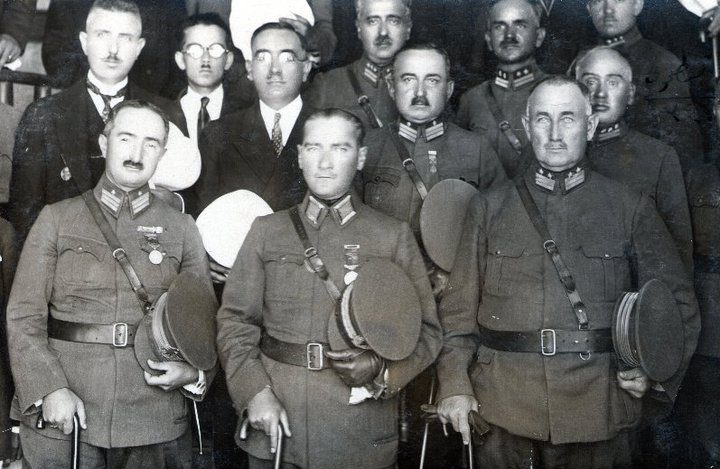
Mareşal Mustafa Kemal Pasha (center), the president of Turkey with other generals of the Turkish Armed Forces in 1925.

The president of Turkey has the constitutional right to represent the Supreme Military Command of the Turkish Armed Forces, on behalf of the Grand National Assembly of Turkey, and to decide on the mobilization of the Turkish Armed Forces, to appoint the chief of the general staff, to call the National Security Council to meet, to preside over the National Security Council, to proclaim martial law or state of emergency, and to issue decrees having the force of law, upon a decision of the Council of Ministers meeting under his/her chairmanship. With all these issues above written in the Constitution of Turkey, the executive rights are given to the president of the Republic of Turkey to be represented as the commander-in-chief of the nation.

=== Turkmenistan ===
According to Article 53 of the Constitution of Turkmenistan, the President of Turkmenistan is the Supreme Commander-in-Chief of the Armed Forces of Turkmenistan, gives orders on general or partial mobilization, use of the Armed Forces, changing their locations, bringing them into combat condition, appoints the high command of the Armed Forces, and manages the activities of the State Security Council of Turkmenistan.

=== Tunisia ===
According to Chapter 94 of the Constitution of the Republic of Tunisia, the President of the Republic of Tunisia is the Supreme Commander of the Tunisian Armed Forces. It is the guarantor of the country's independence, territorial integrity and territorial integrity. He is the one who declares war and concludes peace, in addition to appointing the highest military and security ranks in the state.

=== Ukraine ===
The President of Ukraine is the Supreme Commander-in-Chief of the Armed Forces of Ukraine empowered by Article 106, paragraph 17 of the Ukrainian Constitution, the president has the ability to submit a declaration of war to the parliament and issue commands to the army and military formations. The title of commander-in-chief of the Armed Forces of Ukraine is held by the highest-ranking military officer (i.e. the chief of defence) this position is subordinate to that of the president.

=== United Kingdom ===
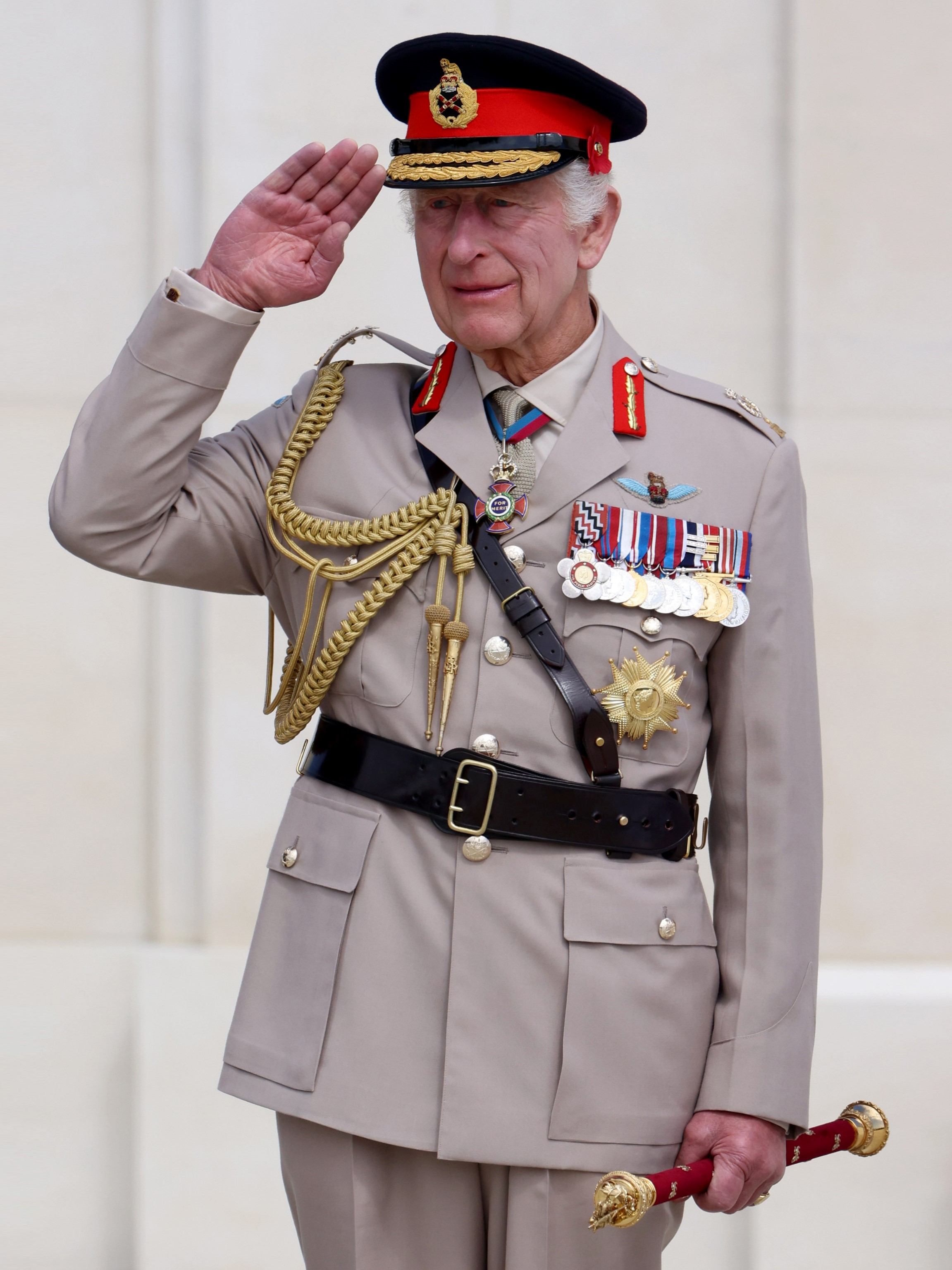
Charles III is the Head of the Armed Forces of the United Kingdom.

The British monarch is the Head of the Armed Forces of the United Kingdom and is also sometimes described as "commander-in-chief". Administration of the armed forces is delegated to the Defence Council which is chaired by the Secretary of State for Defence, but the monarch remains the focal point of ultimate authority over the armed forces; members of the British Armed Forces swear an oath of allegiance to the monarch, (Note: Historically, members of the Royal Navy 'entered' service (rather than enlisted) and did not swear an oath as the Navy's existence stems from the Sovereign’s prerogative rather than an act of parliament. However, since the Armed Forces Act 2006, ratings have 'enlisted' in line with the other services and are required to take the oath or affirmation. Commissioned officers of the Royal Navy are still not required to take the oath or affirmation.) and commissions to officers are issued by the monarch.

The Commander-in-Chief of the Forces was the title given to the professional head of the British Army until 1904. The title of commander-in-chief may also be bestowed on the commander of a large military field force (such as the former appointments of the Commander-in-Chief, Land Forces, the Commander-in-Chief, India, and the Commander-in-Chief, British Army of the Rhine) or of a Royal Navy station (such as the Commander-in-Chief, North America and West Indies Station). The appointment of commander-in-chief is often combined with the civil office of governor of a British Overseas Territory (and formerly of a colony). In the Commonwealth Realms, the title of commander-in-chief is typically bestowed on the country's governor-general as the monarch's representative via letters patent.

=== United States ===
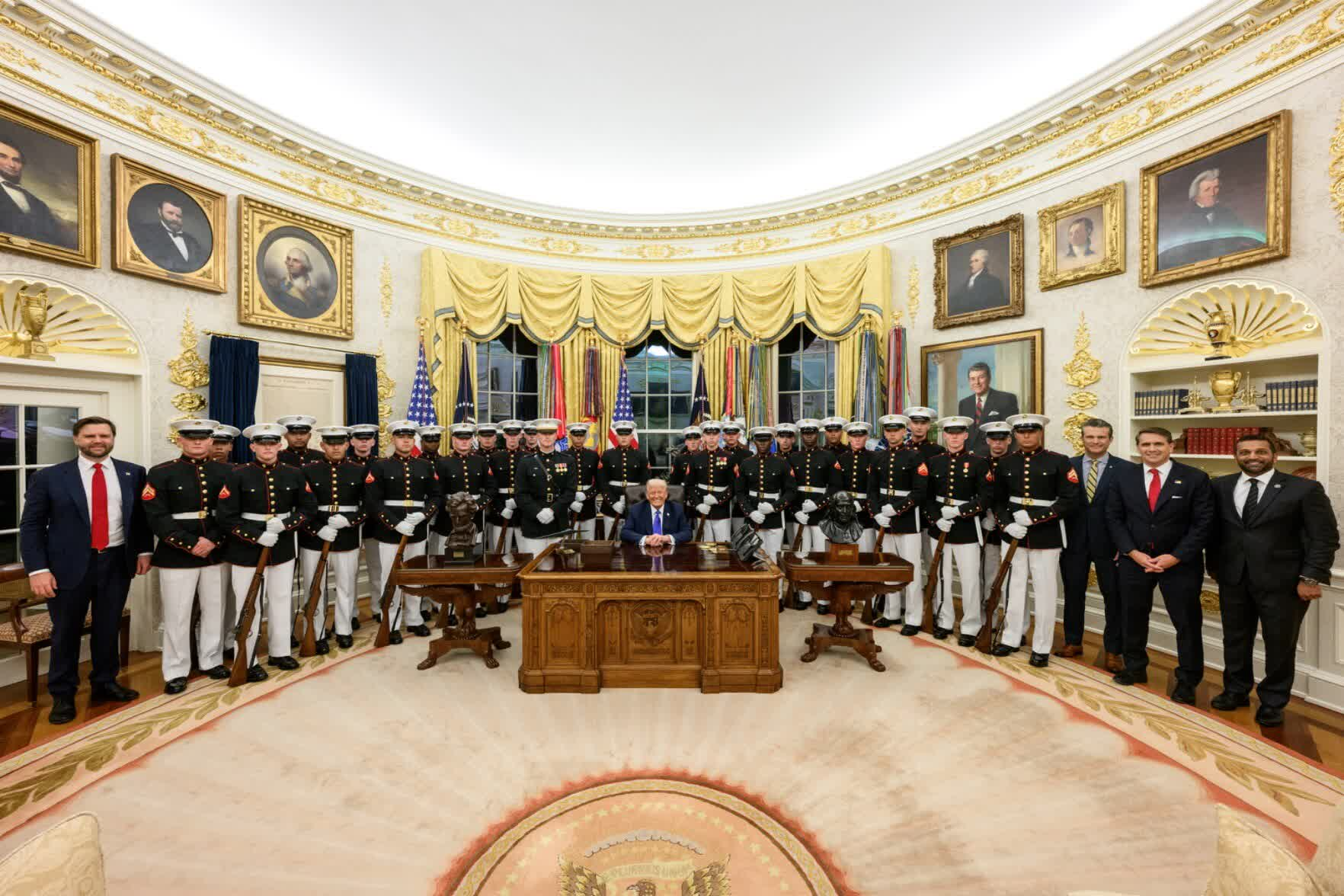
President Donald J. Trump in his capacity as commander-in-chief, welcomes the Marine Corps Silent Drill Platoon to the Oval Office.

According to Article II, Section 2, Clause I of the Constitution, the president of the United States is "Commander in Chief of the Army and Navy of the United States, and of the militia of the several States, when called into the actual Service of the United States." Since the National Security Act of 1947, the commander-in-chief provision has been understood to mean all United States Armed Forces. U.S. ranks have their roots in British military traditions, with the president possessing ultimate authority, but no rank, maintaining a civilian status. The exact degree of authority that the Constitution grants to the president as commander-in-chief has been the subject of much debate throughout history, with Congress at various times granting the president wide authority and at others attempting to restrict that authority.

==== U.S. States ====
In U.S. States, the governor also serves as the commander-in-chief of the National Guard, State Militia, and State Defense Forces. In Kentucky, for example:

The Governor shall be commander in chief of the Kentucky active militia, and the adjutant general shall be the executive officer and shall be responsible to the Governor for the proper functioning of the Kentucky active militia, and he is hereby authorized and empowered to take necessary action to perfect and maintain an efficient organization for the purposes herein set out. He shall have charge of all matters of administration and organization, which shall be in all respects, insofar as necessary and applicable, the same as that of the National Guard.

Similarly, in California: "The Governor is commander in chief of a militia that shall be provided by statute. The Governor may call it forth to execute the law."

=== Uzbekistan ===
The Uzbek president holds the constitutional position of Supreme Commander of the Armed Forces of Uzbekistan, according to the Constitution of Uzbekistan. In this capacity, the president give decisions on declaring war or martial law, the appointment of senior officials, and the development of the armed forces. In the event of an attack on the republic, the president announce a state of war and will submit within 72 hours a resolution for a plan of action to the Oliy Majlis. When the country is in a wartime situation, the minister of defense will serve in an official capacity as the deputy supreme commander-in-chief of the armed forces, essentially assisting the president in his day-to-day activities and decisions regarding national security.

=== Venezuela ===
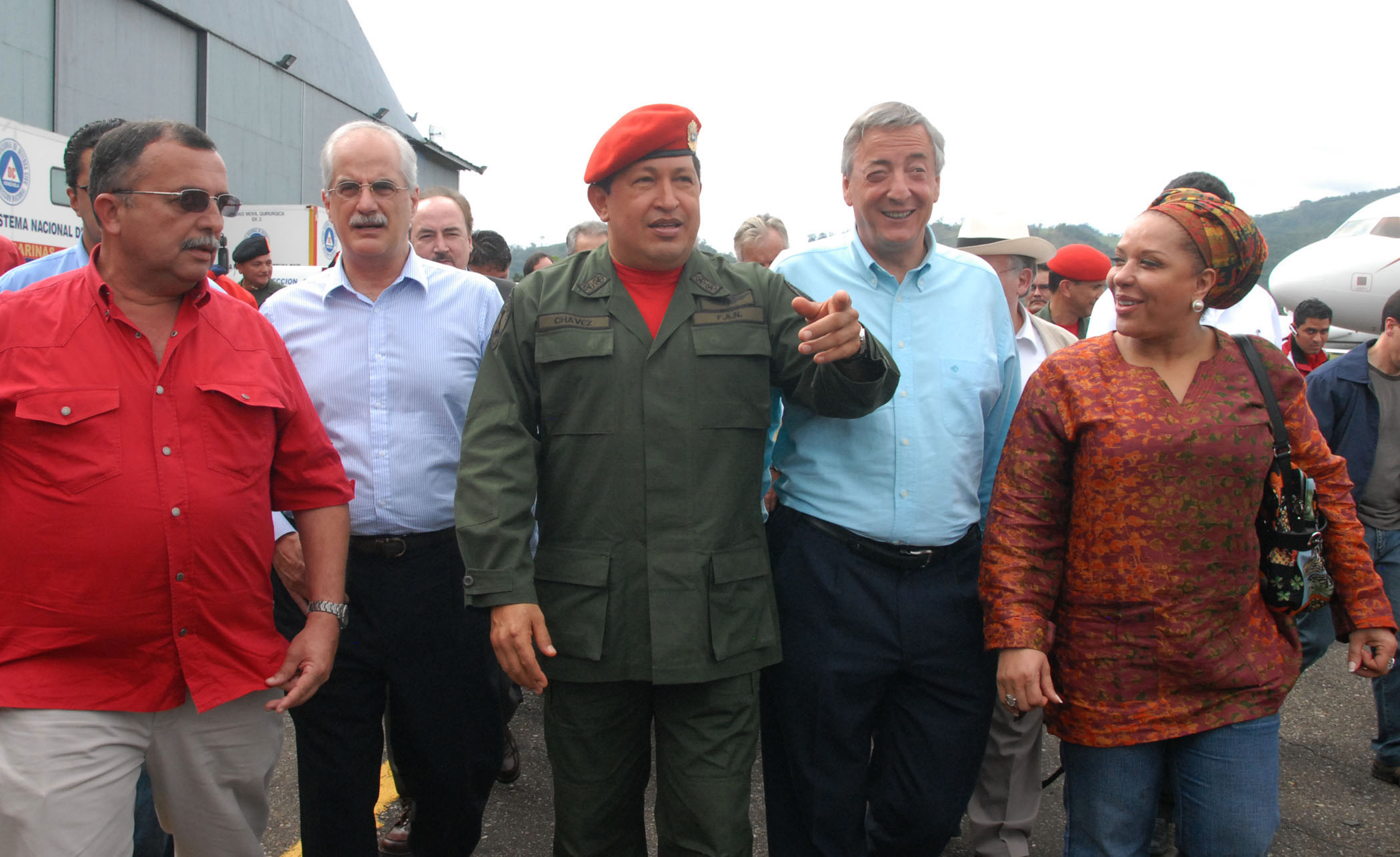
Hugo Chavez, the president of Venezuela, dressed in military uniform in August 2006.

According to the Venezuelan constitution, the president is the commander-in-chief of the Armed Forces. The office of the Venezuelan military supreme commander in chief has always been held by the president of Venezuela as per constitutional requirements. However, with a new law sanctioned in 2008, the "comandante en jefe" rank is not only a function attributed to the executive branch but a full military rank given to the president upon taking office. Upon assumption he or she receives a saber, epaulette, shoulder knot, shoulder board and sleeve insignia and full military uniform to be used in military events while performing the duties as president. The shoulder insignia mirrors Cuban practice but is derived from the German-styled officer rank insignia.

=== Vietnam ===
The de jure commander-in-chief of the armed forces is the president of Vietnam, through his post as chairman of National Defense and Security Council. Though this position is nominal and real power is assumed by the Central Military Commission of the Communist Party of Vietnam. The Secretary of Central Military Commission (general secretary of the Communist Party of Vietnam ex officio) is the de facto commander-in-chief.

The minister of Defence oversees operations of the Ministry of Defence, and the Vietnam People's Army. He also oversees such agencies as the General Staff and the General Logistics Department. However, military policy is ultimately directed by the Central Military Commission of the ruling Communist Party of Vietnam.

== See also ==
Within NATO and the European Union, the term Chief of Defence (CHOD) is usually used as a generic term for the highest-ranked office held by a professional military officer on active duty, irrespective of their actual title or powers.

- Caesarism
- Civilian control of the military
- Command and control
- Commanding officer
- Deep state (state within a state)
- Defence minister
- Generalissimo
- Magister militum
- Militarism
- Military junta
- Praetorianism
- Strongman (politics)
- Supreme Commander (disambiguation)
- Warlord

== Sources ==
- Pollpeter, Kevin; Allen, Kenneth W., eds. (14 June 2012). The PLA as Organization v2.0 (Report). China Aerospace Studies Institute.
