= Section 40 of the Constitution of Australia =

Constitutional provision on voting in the Australian House of Representatives

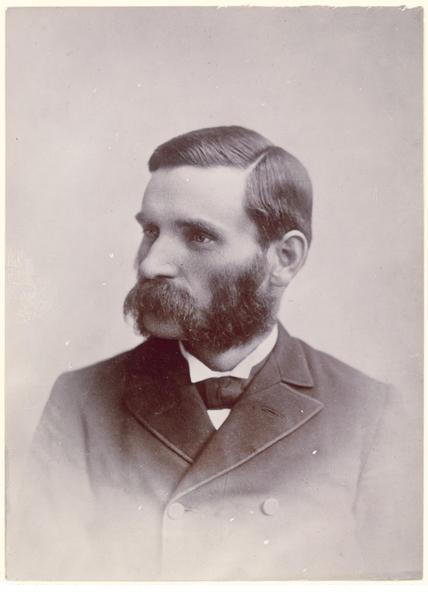
Speaker Frederick Holder made the first casting vote in 1902

Section 40 of the Constitution of Australia provides that questions in the House of Representatives shall be determined by majority vote, excluding that of the Speaker.

== Text ==
Questions arising in the House of Representatives shall be determined by a majority of votes other than that of the Speaker. The Speaker shall not vote unless the numbers are equal, and then he shall have a casting vote.

— Constitution of Australia, s 40

== Interpretation ==
If there is a tie, then the Speaker has a casting vote. The Speaker does not have to use this vote, and if they choose not to do so, then the question is answered in the negative.

Unlike in the Senate, tied votes in the House of Representatives are rare. From Federation until the end of 2004, there have been only 21 occasions on which a Speaker or Deputy Speaker has chosen to use their casting vote.

Aside from the Speaker, the Deputy Speaker, Second Deputy Speaker or any other person elected to perform the Speaker's duties under section 36 of the Constitution has a casting vote in the case of a tie.

A member of the Speaker's Panel does not have a casting vote, because they are nominated by the Speaker, not elected by the House.

=== Comparison with the Senate ===
The position in the House of Representatives differs from that in the Senate. Under section 23, the President of the Senate has a deliberative vote on all questions, as does every other senator, but does not have a casting vote. When the votes in the Senate are equally divided, the question is lost. This difference is designed to preserve the equality of representation of the states in the Senate: if the President had a casting vote, the state represented by the senator who happened to be President would have either an additional vote or the power to decide issues when the other senators were equally divided.

=== Convention on the exercise of the casting vote ===
By long-standing convention, where a casting vote is required, the Speaker exercises it in a manner that preserves the status quo rather than deciding the question on its merits. This means that the Speaker will ordinarily vote against a motion if that would maintain the existing state of affairs, or in favour of further discussion where that is possible. The convention is not legally binding and the Speaker retains a discretion, but it is well established in House practice and is set out in House of Representatives Practice.

== Drafting ==
The Parliament of Victoria suggested that the Speaker should be able to vote on constitutional amendments even when the votes are not equal (but in the case of a tie, they would not get a second vote and the amendment would be rejected).

Section 128 of the Constitution says that constitutional amendments require an absolute majority in both houses to be passed – a majority of the total number of MPs, not just those present and voting. For this reason, the Victorian Parliament thought that the Speaker's vote might be necessary to achieve the required number of MPs.

This suggestion was rejected at the 1897 Sydney Constitutional Convention.

== See also ==
- Section 23 of the Constitution of Australia (the equivalent section in the Senate)
- Speaker of the Australian House of Representatives
- Casting vote
