= Section 43 of the Constitution of Australia =

Section 43 of the Constitution of Australia prevents a person from being a member of both houses of the Parliament of Australia. Section 43 states:

A member of either House of the Parliament shall be incapable of being chosen or of sitting as a member of the other House.

In Sykes v Cleary, the High Court stated (in obiter) that the words "shall be incapable of being chosen" must refer to the process of being chosen such that a member of one house must resign their seat before even contesting an election for the other house.

== Examples ==
There have been numerous people who have served in both the Senate and the House of Representatives, most notably John Gorton, who was appointed Prime Minister, while still a member of the Australian Senate, following the disappearance of Harold Holt in December 1967. In accordance with section 43 of the Constitution, Gorton resigned his seat in the Senate to contest Holt's now vacant and ultra-safe seat of Higgins at the subsequent by-election. Gorton maintained his office as Prime Minister under section 64 of the Constitution.
