= Section 1 of the Constitution of Australia =

Section 1 of the Constitution of Australia reads:

The legislative power of the Commonwealth shall be vested in a Federal Parliament, which shall consist of the Queen, a Senate, and a House of Representatives, and which is hereinafter called The Parliament, or The Parliament of the Commonwealth.
