= Section 6 of the Constitution of Australia =

Section 6 of the Constitution of Australia makes mandatory at least one sitting of the Parliament of Australia within a calendar year of its previous sitting.
