= Section 4 of the Constitution of Australia =

Section 4 of the Constitution of Australia formally established the vice-regal position of the Governor-General of Australia.
