= Section 3 of the Constitution of Australia =

Australian constitutional provision for Governor-General's salary

Section 3 of the Constitution of Australia deals with the salary of Governor General. The salary of Governor-General is paid from the Consolidated Revenue Fund and is regulated by the Constitution, which fixed the initial salary at £10,000, an amount that would not increase until 1974.

== The Constitution ==
Section 3 of the Constitution states:

There shall be payable to the Queen out of the Consolidated Revenue fund of the Commonwealth, for the salary of the Governor General, an annual sum which, until the Parliament otherwise provides, shall be ten thousand pounds. The salary of a Governor General shall not be altered during his continuance in office.

== History ==
The salary remained unchanged at £10,000 until the introduction of decimal currency in Australia in 1966 when it became A$20,000 and remained unchanged until 1974. The 1st Governor-General, Lord Hopetoun, received no allowance for maintaining Government Houses in Melbourne and Sydney nor for staff, travel or other expenses. Instead the Governor-General was required to meet these from the fixed salary. The 2nd Governor-General, Baron Tennyson fared slightly better, with an allowance for the operation of Government House in Melbourne and Sydney, and the Official Secretary to the Governor-General was paid by the Australian government. The Governor-General was required to meet staff salaries and some household expenses from their salary. The requirement to meet staff salaries continued until the retirement of the 12th Governor-General, Sir William McKell, with half his salary going on "staff sustenance". The contribution to household expenses continued until the retirement of the 17th Governor General, Sir Paul Hasluck. Before the appointment of Sir John Kerr as the 18th Governor-General in 1974, the salary was increased to $30,000, and the government covered all expenses. Today, the salary is set to be slightly higher than that of the Chief Justice of the High Court, over a five-year period. Until 2001, Governors-General did not pay income tax on their salary; this was changed after the Queen agreed to pay tax.

No.	Years of office	Name	Salary	Ref.
18	1974–1977	The Right Hon. Sir John Kerr, AK GCMG GCVO QC	$30,000	
19	1977–1982	The Right Hon. Sir Zelman Cowen, AK GCMG GCVO QC	$37,000	
20	1982–1989	The Right Hon. Sir Ninian Stephen, KG AK GCMG GCVO KBE QC	$70,000	
21	1989–1996	The Hon. William Hayden, AC	$95,000	
22	1996–2001	The Hon. Sir William Deane, AC KBE QC	$58,000	(Note: Sir William Deane's salary was reduced at his request to take into account his judicial pension.)
23	2001–2003	The Right Rev. and Hon. Peter Hollingworth, AC OBE	$310,000	
24	2003–2008	Major General The Hon. Michael Jeffery, AC CVO MC	$365,000	(Note: General Jeffrey donated his military pension to charity whilst Governor-General.)
25	2008–2014	The Hon. Dame Quentin Bryce, AD CVO	$394,000	
26	2014–2019	His Excellency General The Hon. Sir Peter Cosgrove, AK MC	$425,000	
27	2019–2024	His Excellency General The Hon. David Hurley, AK CVO DSC FTSE	$495,000	
28	2024–present	Her Excellency General The Hon. Sam Mostyn, AK	$709,017	

== A question of currency ==
The ten thousand pounds specified by the Constitution referred to the currency in use in Australia in 1901, pound sterling. This was replaced by the Australian pound in 1910, which was linked to the gold standard at parity to £ sterling until 1931. When the United Kingdom abandoned the gold standard in 1931, the Australian pound was devalued and traded at a discount to pound sterling of around 25%. The Australian pound was replaced by the Australian dollar on 14 February 1966, where £1 Australian equalled A$2.

It has been argued unsuccessfully that that legislation passed in Australia since 1966 is unconstitutional because it has been signed by Governors-General who were paid in dollars, not pounds as specified by section 3 of the Constitution.
