= Section 3 lands =

Section 3 lands are public lands in the United States within a grazing district administered by the Bureau of Land Management under Section 3 of the Taylor Grazing Act of 1934. BLM authorizes livestock grazing on these lands by issuing permits. Section 3 lands make up the vast majority of BLM-administered lands.
