= Section 2 of the Constitution of Australia =

Section 2 of the Constitution of Australia says that there shall be a Governor-General to represent the monarch in Australia.

The Governor-General of the Commonwealth of Australia is the representative in Australia at federal/national level of the Australian monarch (currently King Charles III). The functions and roles of the Governor-General include appointing ambassadors, ministers and judges, giving royal assent to legislation, issuing writs for elections and bestowing honours. The Governor-General is President of the Federal Executive Council and Commander-in-Chief of the Australian Defence Force. All these things are done and all these posts are held under the authority of the Australian Constitution.

The term of office is at the king's pleasure but it is usually five years.

A Governor-General appointed by the Queen shall be Her Majesty’s representative in the Commonwealth, and shall have and may exercise in the Commonwealth during the Queen's pleasure, but subject to this Constitution, such powers and functions of the Queen as Her Majesty may be pleased to assign to him. — Section 2 of the Constitution of Australia
