= New Zealand Memorial, Canberra =

Coordinates: 35.289°S 149.141°E

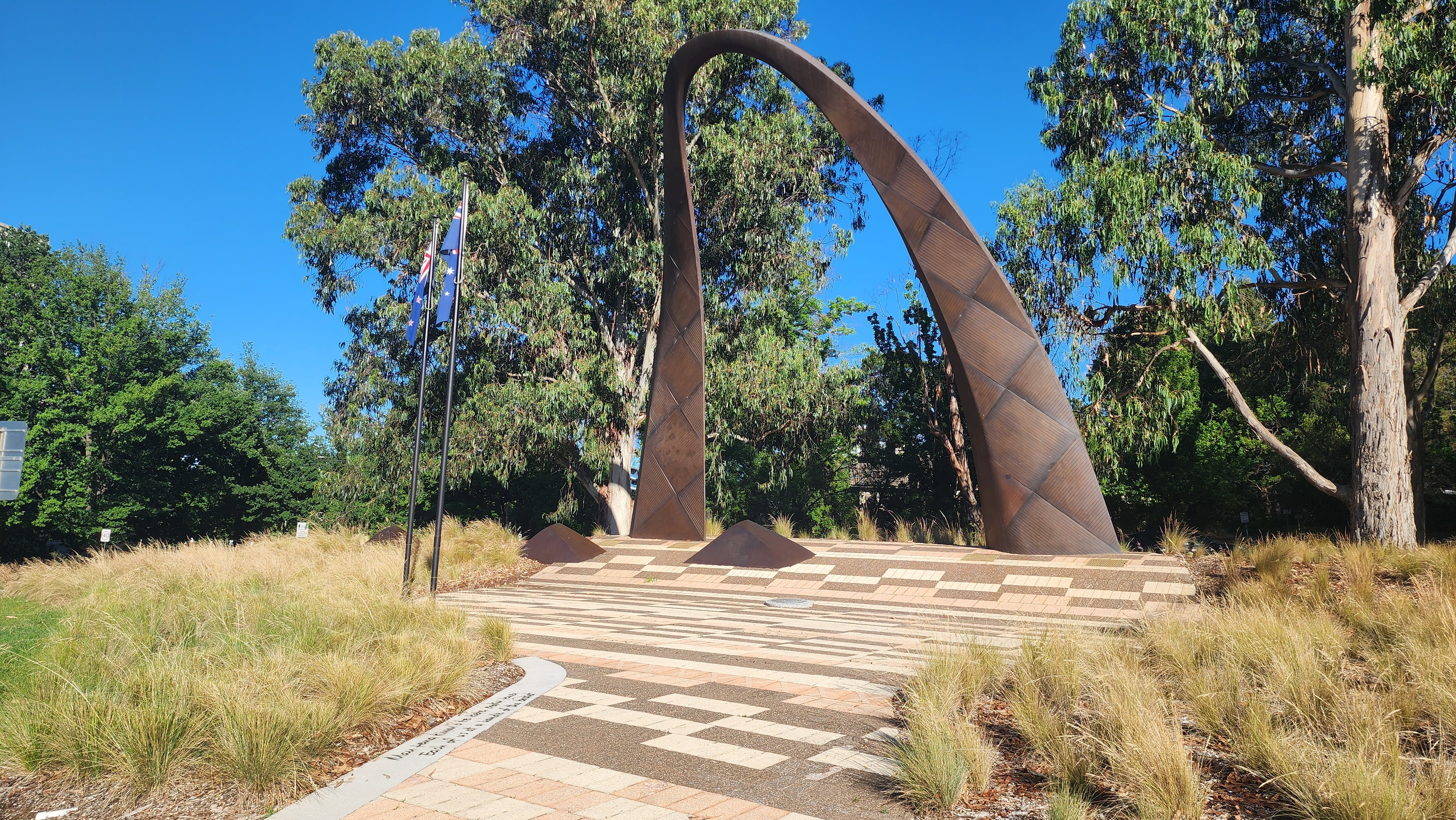
West or Australian side.

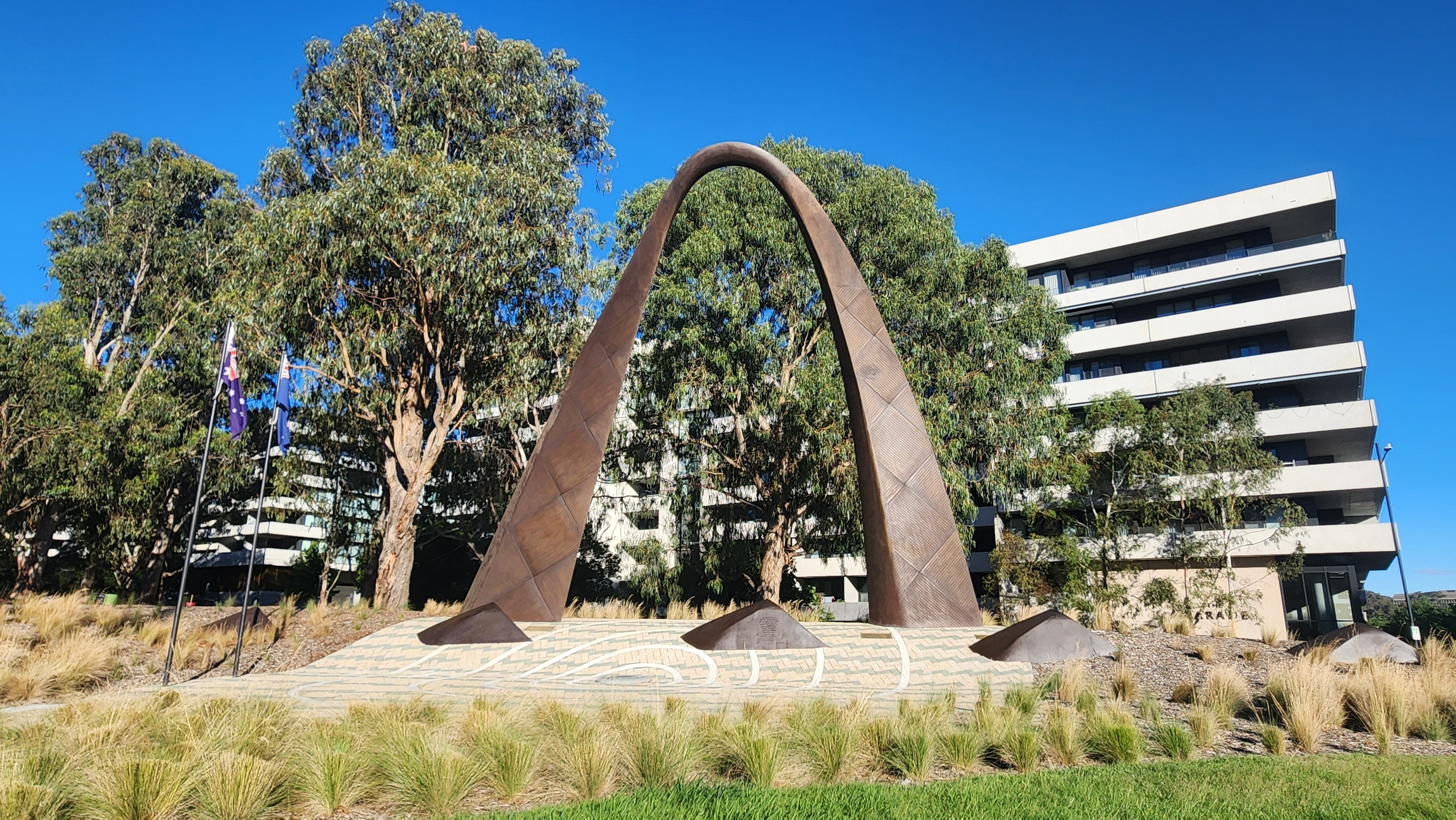
East or New Zealand side.

The New Zealand Memorial in Canberra, Australia, commemorates the relationship between New Zealand and Australia, and stands at the corner of Anzac Parade and Constitution Avenue, the former bisecting the Parliamentary Triangle and the latter forming the base of the triangle that represents the form of government in Canberra, the national capital city of Australia.

The memorial was opened on the eve of Anzac Day (25 April) in 2001 by the prime ministers of both countries.

== Design ==
The memorial was designed by artist Kingsley Baird and architects Studio of Pacific Architecture, both of Wellington, New Zealand. It consists of two kete, or basket handles, one on each side of Anzac Parade, which places them approximately 100 m apart. The image of a basket carried by two people expresses the shared effort of the two nations to achieve common goals in both peace and war, and to acknowledge the courage and sacrifice of service men and women who served shoulder-to-shoulder on foreign soil.

Māori language: Mau tena kiwa o te kete. maku tenei
English language: Each of us at a handle of the basket

the kete handles stand upon paving patterns which remind of the weave of a basket, representing the interweaving of lands, peoples and cultures. Daisy Nadjungdanga from Arnhem Land in the Northern Territory of Australia designed the paving under the western handle; Toi Te Rito Maihi and Allen Wihongi from Northland, New Zealand, designed the paving under the eastern handle. The surface of the paving is made with Canterbury, Coromandel and Golden Bay stone.

At the centre of the paving on each side is buried soil from Gallipoli, the birth of the ANZAC tradition as soldiers fought together in the Australian and New Zealand Army Corps in 1915. A ceremony held on 26 February 2001 soil from Chunuk Bair was buried in a rimu box on the New Zealand side, while on the Australian side, soil from Lone Pine was buried in a box made from Australian jarrah. Inscribed on the paving are the names of the campaigns where New Zealanders and Australians have fought together.

== Poem ==
A poem by Jenny Bornholdt is inscribed on a bronze 'boulder' under the arch on each side.

This sea we cross over
and over. Tides turning on
gold and sheep. On rain. On sand.
On earth the fallen lie
beneath. On geography. On
women standing. Matilda
waltzing. On people of
gardens and movement.
On trade and union.
This sea a bridge
of faith. This sea we are
contained and moved by.
