= Australia–New Zealand relations =

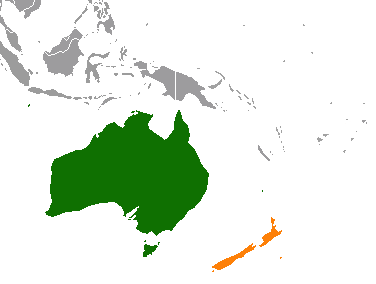

- Australia: New Zealand

Diplomatic mission
- High Commission of Australia, Wellington: High Commission of New Zealand, Canberra

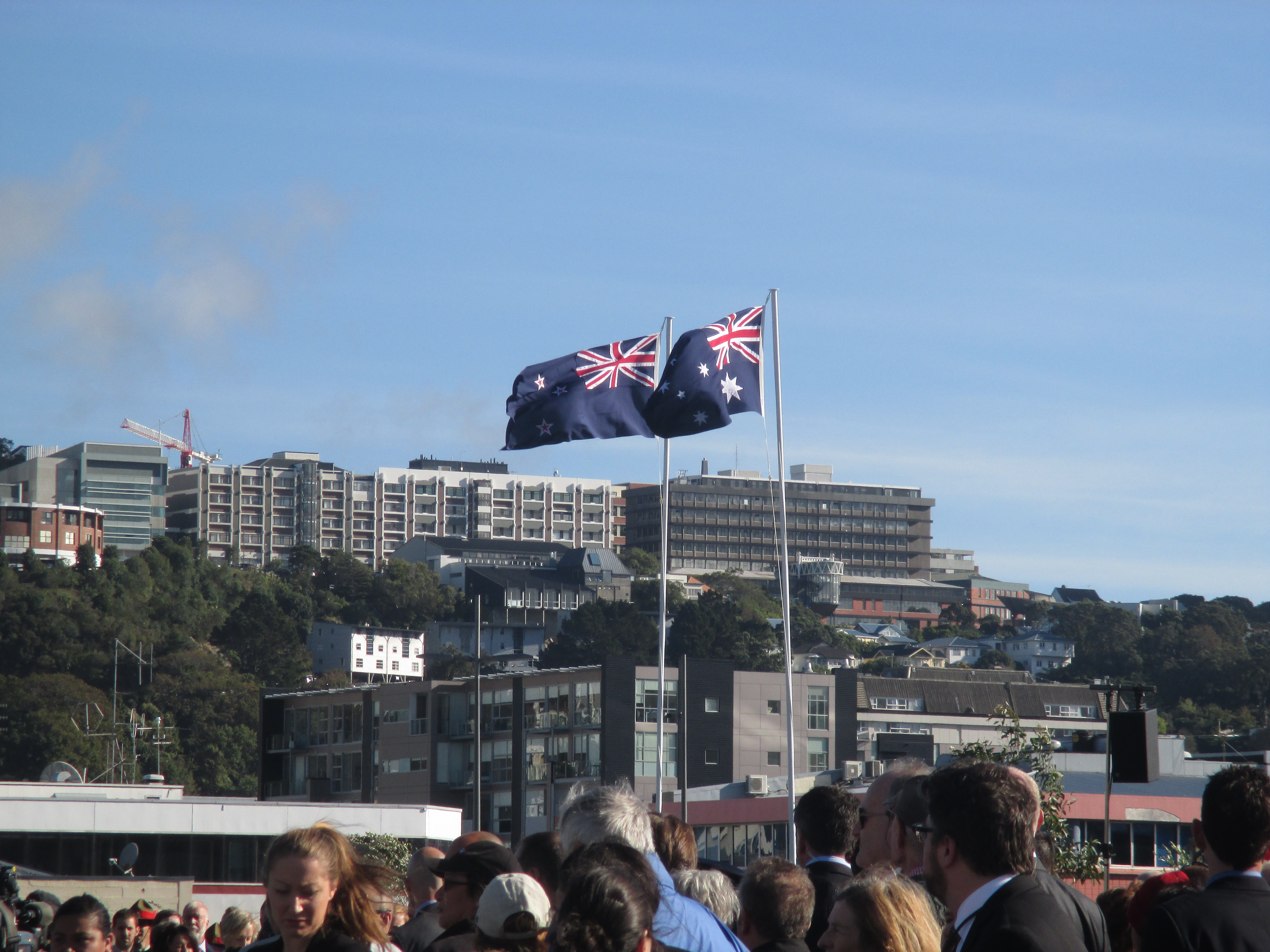
Flags of Australia & New Zealand flying side-by-side in Wellington, New Zealand

Foreign relations between neighbouring countries Australia and New Zealand, also referred to as Trans-Tasman relations, are extremely close. Both countries share a British colonial heritage as antipodean Dominions and settler colonies, and both are part of the core Anglosphere. New Zealand sent representatives to the constitutional conventions which led to the uniting of the six Australian colonies but opted not to join. In the Boer War and in both world wars, New Zealand soldiers fought alongside Australian soldiers. In recent years, the Closer Economic Relations free trade agreement and its predecessors have inspired ever-converging economic integration. Despite some shared similarities, the cultures of Australia and New Zealand also have their own sets of differences and there are sometimes differences of opinion which some have declared as symptomatic of sibling rivalry. This often centres upon sports and in commercio-economic tensions, such as those arising from the failure of Ansett Australia and those engendered by the formerly long-standing Australian ban on New Zealand apple imports.

Both countries are constitutional monarchies and Commonwealth realms sharing the same person as the sovereign and independent head of state – with parliamentary democracies based on the Westminster system. Their only land border defines the western extent of the Ross Dependency and eastern extent of the Australian Antarctic Territory. They acknowledge two distinct maritime boundaries conclusively delimited by the Australia–New Zealand Maritime Treaty of 2004.

In 2017, a major poll showed that New Zealand was considered Australia's "best friend", a position previously held by the United States.

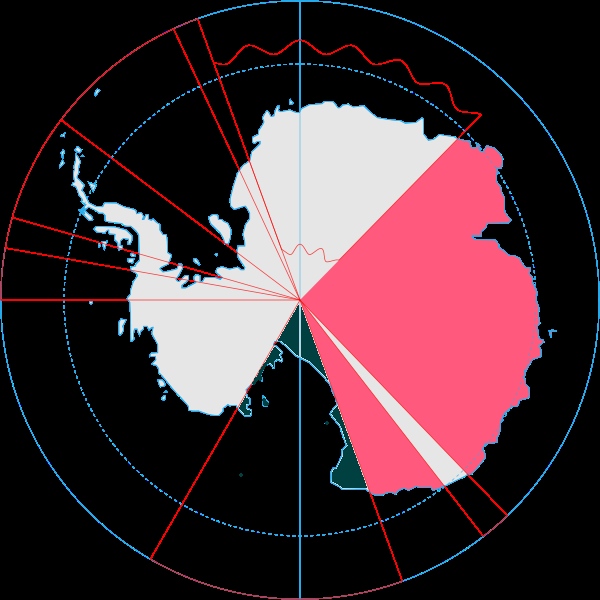
Antarctic territorial claims of Australia (in pink) and New Zealand (in turquoise). These claims have been maintained since 1933 and 1924, respectively, and are mutually recognised as to sovereignty.

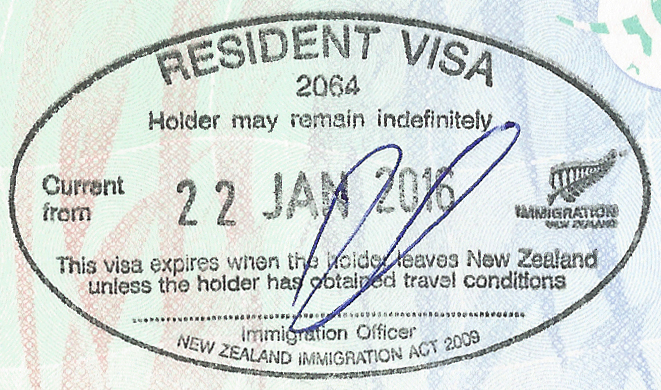
A New Zealand stamp in an Australian travel document

== History ==
The history of Indigenous Australians is generally thought to be rich to the extent of at least 40,000–45,000 years duration, whereas the ancestors of Māori arrived in Aotearoa/New Zealand in several waves by means of waka from Eastern Polynesia in waves roughly between 1320 and 1350. Indigenous Australians and Māori (and by extension Moriori) are not recorded to have met or interacted before the 17th and 18th centuries European exploration of Australia. Regarding the respective indigenous populations, while it may be said that there is a single Māori language and the iwi have been able to present as a unified population represented by a monarch neither has ever been able to be said of the Australian Aboriginal languages or their corresponding population groups.

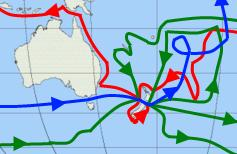
The routes of Captain James Cook's voyages. The first voyage is shown in red, second voyage in green, and third voyage in blue.

The first European landing in Australia occurred in the Janszoon voyage of 1605–06. Abel Tasman in two distinct voyages in the period 1642–1644 is recorded as the first person to have coastally explored regions of the respective landforms, including Van Diemen's Land – later named for him as the Australian state of Tasmania. The first voyage of James Cook stands as significant for the circumnavigation of New Zealand in 1769 and as the European discovery and first ever coastal navigation of Eastern Australia from April to August 1770. The European settlement of Australia and New Zealand, then referred to as the colony of New South Wales, dates from the arrival of the First Fleet into Cadi/Port Jackson on Australia Day, 1788.

New Zealand was separated from the Colony of New South Wales in 1840, at which time its European population numbered about 2,000 descended from Christian missionaries, sealers, and whalers (as opposed to mainland Australia's much larger penal colony population).

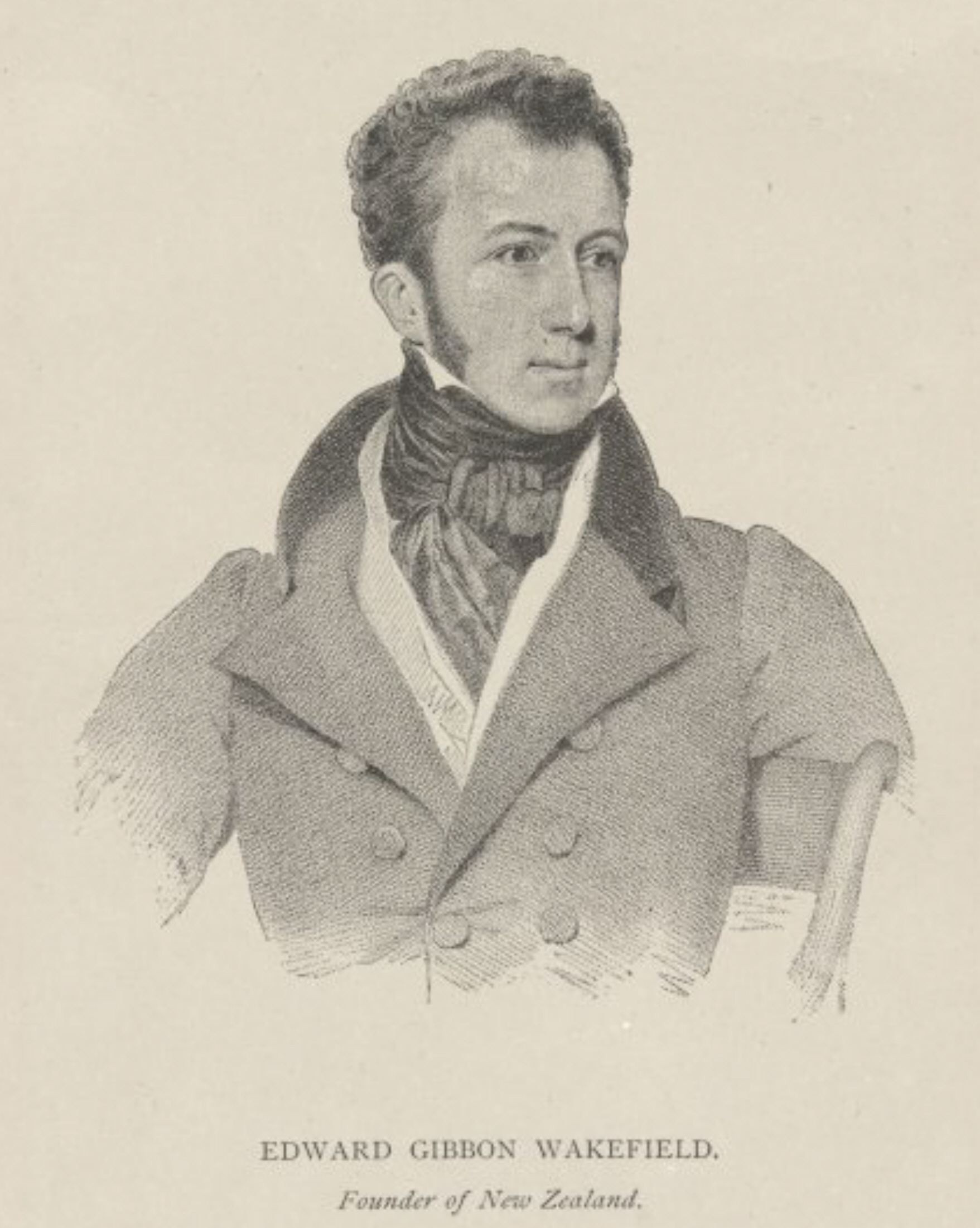
Edward Gibbon Wakefield had a major influence on British plans for colonisation.

Although it is accurate to distinguish that New Zealand was never a penal colony, neither were some of the Australian colonies. In particular, South Australia was founded and settled in a similar manner to New Zealand, both being influenced by the ideas of Edward Gibbon Wakefield.

Both countries experienced ongoing internal conflict concerning indigenous and settler populations, although this conflict took very different forms, most sharply manifested in the New Zealand Wars and Australian frontier wars respectively. Whereas Maori iwi endured the Musket Wars of the period 1807–1839 preceding the former in New Zealand, indigenous Australians have no comparable period of the experience of warfare amongst each other employing European-introduced modern weaponry either before or after their own confrontations with European settler society. Both countries experienced nineteenth century gold rushes and during the nineteenth century there was extensive trade and travel between the colonies.

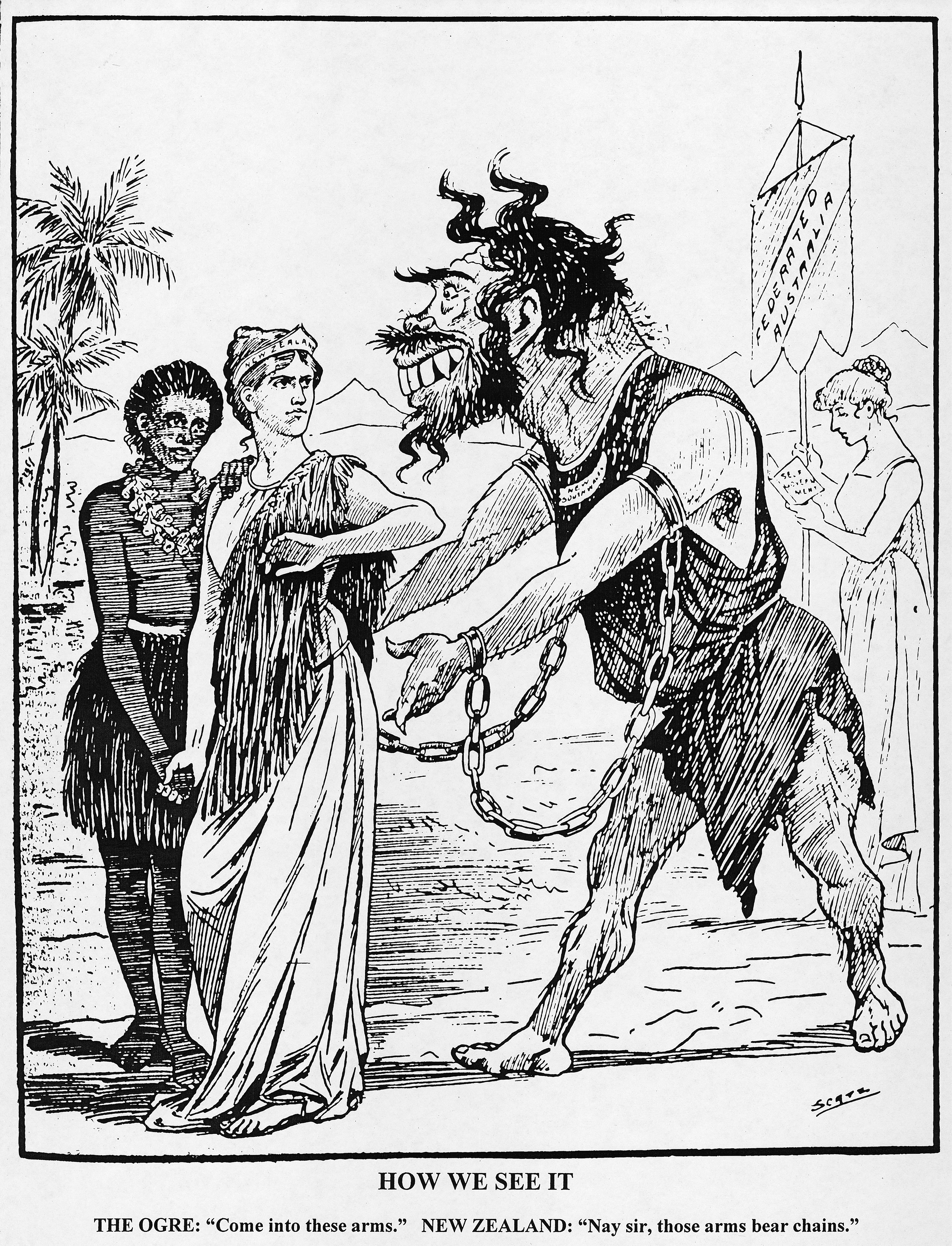
Political cartoon from 1900 that shows the colonies of New Zealand and Fiji rejecting the offer to join the Federation of Australia, with Zealandia referencing the chains as a restraint upon their respective freedoms rather than Australia's origins as a penal colony

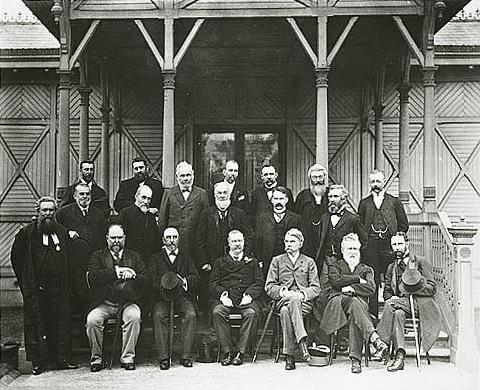
Final meeting of the Federal Council of Australasia in 1899

New Zealand participated as a member of the Federal Council of Australasia from 1885 and fully involved itself among the other self-governing colonies in the 1890 conference and 1891 Convention leading up to Federation of Australia. Ultimately it declined to accept the invitation to join the Commonwealth of Australia resultingly formed in 1901, remaining as a self-governing colony until becoming the Dominion of New Zealand in 1907 and with other territories later constituting the Realm of New Zealand effectively as an independent country of its own. In the 1908 Olympics, the 1911 Festival of Empire and the 1912 Olympics, the two countries were represented at least in sporting competition as the unified entity "Australasia".

Both continued to co-operate politically in the 20th century as each sought closer relations with the United Kingdom, particularly in the area of trade. This was helped by the development of refrigerated shipping, which allowed New Zealand in particular to base its economy on the export of meat and dairy – both of which Australia had in abundance – to Britain.

The two nations sealed the Canberra Pact in January 1944 for successfully prosecuting the war against the Axis powers in World War II and providing for the administration of an armistice and territorial trusteeship in its aftermath. The Agreement foreshadowed the establishment of a permanent Australia–New Zealand Secretariat, it provided for consultation in matters of common interest, it provided for the maintenance of separate military commands and for "the maximum degree of unity in the presentation ... of the views of the two countries".

The quantity of trans-Tasman trade increased by 9% per annum from the early 1980s through to the end of 2007, with the Closer Economic Relations free trade agreement of 1983 being a major turning point. This was partially a result of Britain joining the European Economic Community in the early 1970s, thus restricting the access of both countries to their biggest export market.

== Military ==
In the Harriet Affair of 1834, a group of British soldiers of the 50th Regiment from Australia landed in Taranaki, New Zealand, to rescue Betty Guard, the wife of John (Jacky) Guard, and the Guards' two children, following their kidnapping by local Māori. This was the first clash between Māori and British troops. The expedition was sent by Governor Bourke from Sydney and was subsequently criticised by a British House of Commons report in 1835 for the use of excessive force.

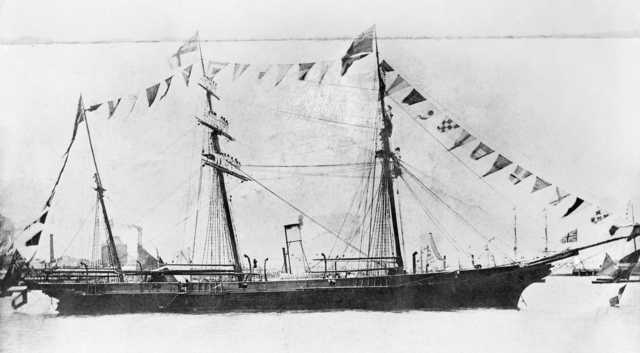
HMCSS Victoria in 1867

In 1861, the Australian ship HMCSS Victoria was dispatched to help the New Zealand colonial government in its war against Māori in Taranaki. Victoria was subsequently used for patrol duties and logistic support, although several personnel were involved in actions against Māori fortifications. In late 1863, the New Zealand government requested troops to assist in the invasion of the Waikato. Promised settlement on confiscated land, more than 2500 Australians were recruited. Other Australians became scouts in the Company of Forest Rangers. Australians were involved in actions at Matarikoriko, Pukekohe East, Titi Hill, Ōrākau and Te Ranga.

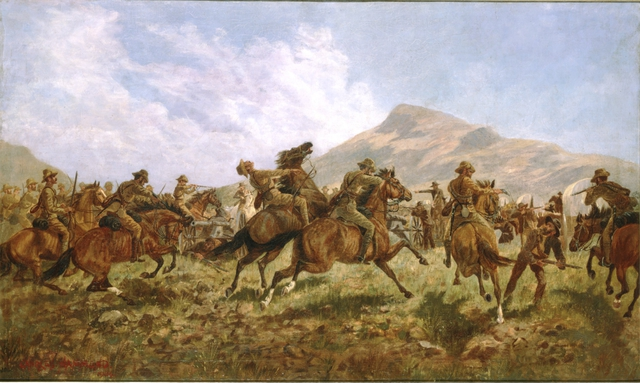
Australians & New Zealanders at Klerksdorp, 24 March 1901

In the late nineteenth and twentieth centuries, both countries or their colonial precursors were enthusiastic members of the British Empire and both either sent soldiers or permitted the sending of military volunteers to the Mahdist War in the Sudan, the quelling of the Boxer Rebellion, the Second Boer War, the First and Second World Wars and the Malayan Emergency and Konfrontasi. Independent of the sense of Empire (or Commonwealth), both nations in the second half of the twentieth century otherwise provided contingents in support of United States strategic aims in the Korean War, Vietnam War, and Gulf War. Whereas military personnel from both countries participated in UNTSO, the Multinational Force and Observers to Sinai, INTERFET to East Timor, the Regional Assistance Mission to Solomon Islands, UNMIS to Sudan, and more recent intervention in Tonga. The New Zealand government officially condemned the 2003 invasion of Iraq and stood apart from Australia in refusing to contribute any combat forces. Somewhat similarly in 1982, although without speaking in condemnation, Australia found no purpose in joining with New Zealand to support the United Kingdom in the Falklands War against Argentina just as New Zealand had declined to join Australia in Allied intervention in the Russian Civil War or in UNEF to Egypt and Israel during the 1970s.

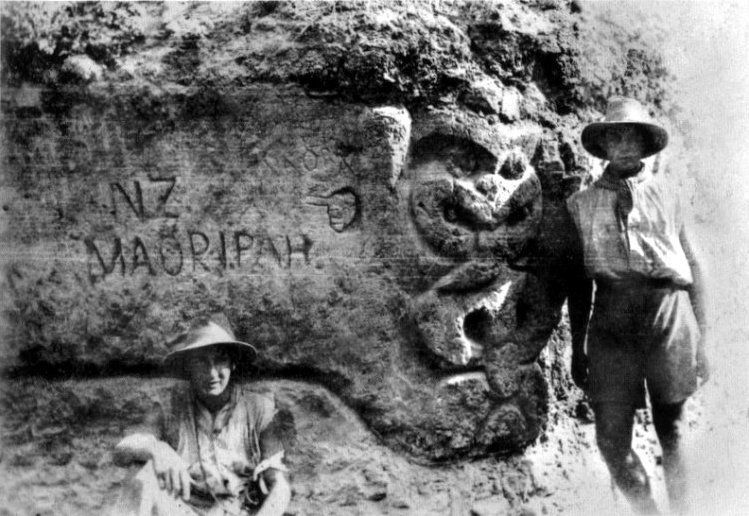
An ANZAC trench at Gallipoli with a Māori whakairo in stone

In the First World War, the soldiers of both countries were formed into the Australian and New Zealand Army Corps (ANZACs). Together, Australia and New Zealand saw their first major military action in the Battle of Gallipoli, in which both suffered major casualties. For many decades the battle was seen by both countries as the moment at which they came of age as nations. It continues to be commemorated annually in both countries on Anzac Day, although since the 1960s there has been some questioning of the "coming of age" idea.

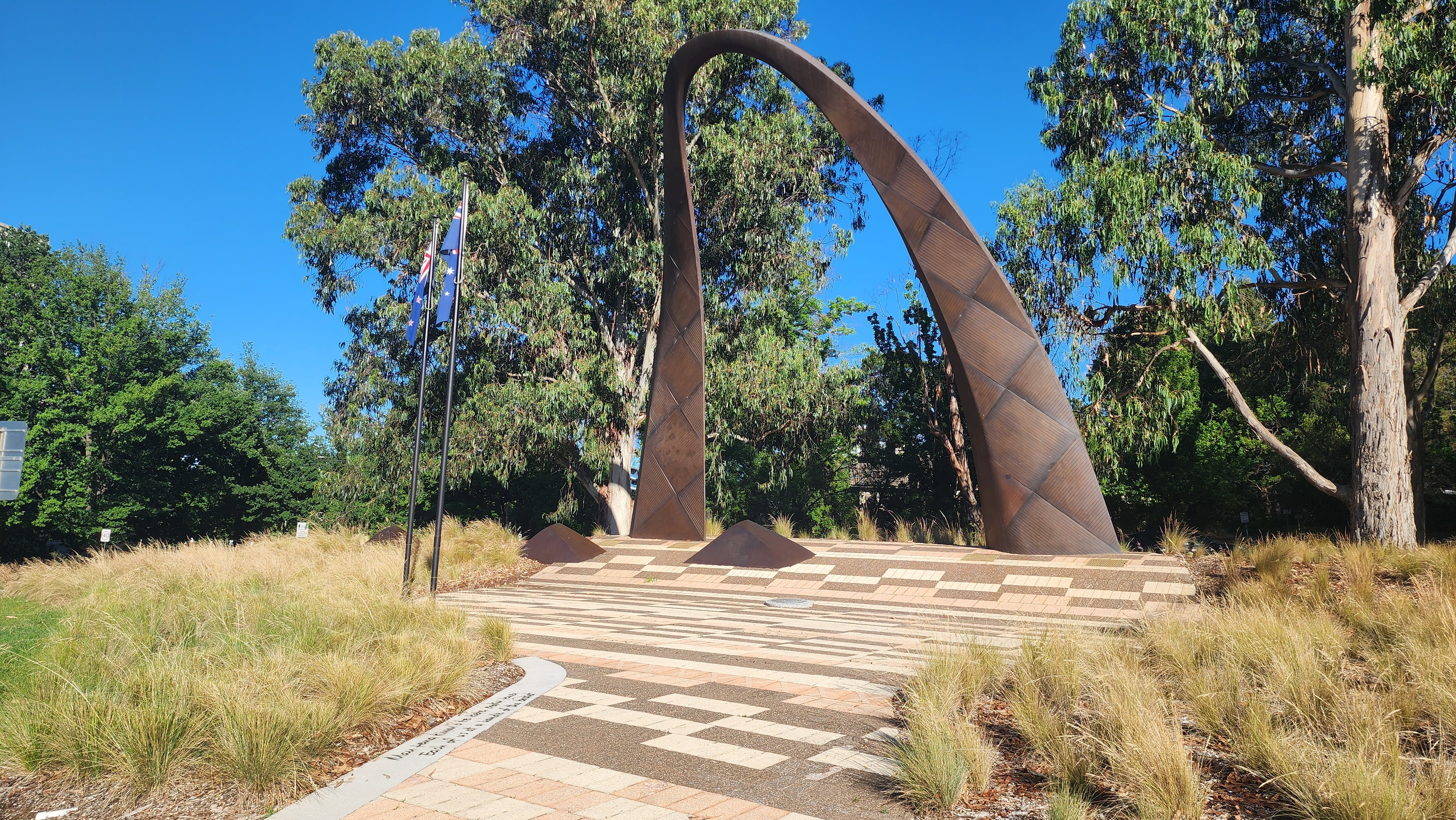
Canberra memorial

World War II was a major turning point for both countries, as they realised that they could no longer rely on the protection of Britain. Australia was particularly struck by this realisation, as it was directly targeted by the Empire of Japan, with Darwin bombed and Broome attacked. Subsequently, both countries sought closer ties with the United States. This resulted in the ANZUS pact of 1951, in which Australia, New Zealand and the United States agreed to defend each other in the event of enemy attack. Although no such attack occurred until, arguably, 11 September 2001, Australia and New Zealand both contributed troops to the Korean and Vietnam Wars. Australia's contribution to the Vietnam War in particular was much larger than New Zealand's; while Australia introduced conscription, New Zealand sent only a token force. Australia has continued to be more committed to the American alliance, ANZUS, than New Zealand; although both countries felt considerable unease about American military policy in the 1980s, New Zealand angered the United States by refusing port access to nuclear ships into its nuclear-free zone from 1985 and in retaliation, the United States 'suspended' its obligations otherwise owed under the alliance treaty to New Zealand. Australia has made a significant contribution to the Iraq War, while New Zealand's much smaller military contribution was limited to UN-authorised reconstruction tasks.

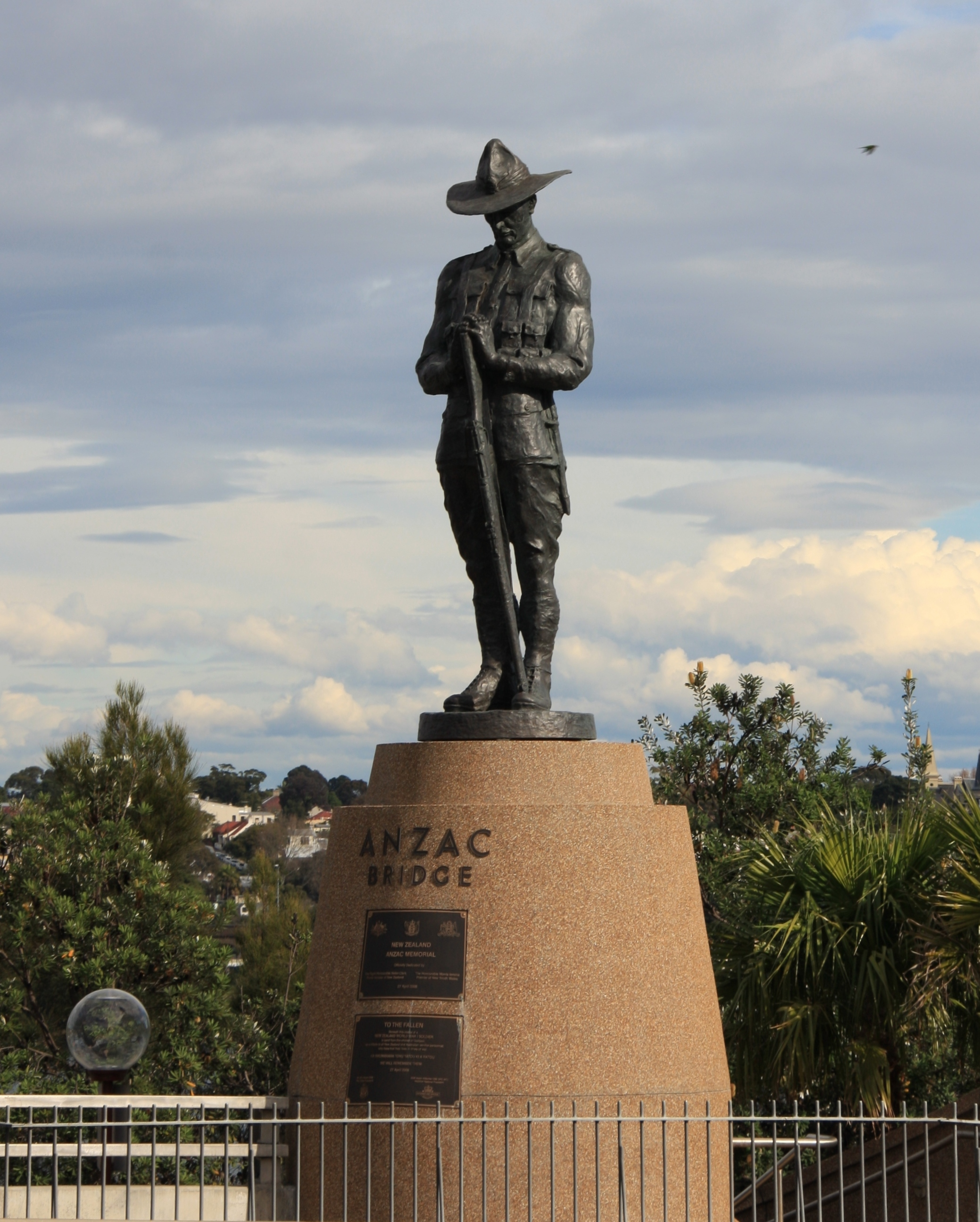
Bridge memorial

Anzac Bridge in Sydney was given its current name on Remembrance Day in 1998 to honour the memory of the ANZACs serving in World War I. An Australian flag flies atop the eastern pylon and a New Zealand flag flies atop the western pylon. A bronze memorial statue of a digger holding a Lee–Enfield rifle resting on his arms reversed was placed on the western end of the bridge on Anzac Day in 2000. A statue of a New Zealand soldier was added to a plinth across the road from the Australian Digger, facing towards the east, and unveiled by Prime Minister of New Zealand Helen Clark in the presence of Premier of New South Wales Morris Iemma on Sunday, 27 April 2008.

In 2001, the Australia–New Zealand Memorial was opened by the prime ministers of both countries on Anzac Parade, Canberra. The memorial commemorates the shared effort to achieve common goals in both peace and war.

Joint defence arrangements involving both countries include the Five Power Defence Arrangements, ANZUS, and the UK-USA Security Agreement for intelligence sharing. Since 1964, Australia, and since 2006, New Zealand have been parties to the ABCA interoperability arrangement of national defence forces. ANZUK was a tripartite force formed by Australia, New Zealand, and the United Kingdom to defend the Asian Pacific region after the United Kingdom withdrew forces from the east of Suez in the early seventies. The ANZUK force was formed in 1971 and disbanded in 1974. The SEATO anti-communist defence organisation also extended membership to both countries for the duration of its existence from 1955 to 1977.

== Exploration ==
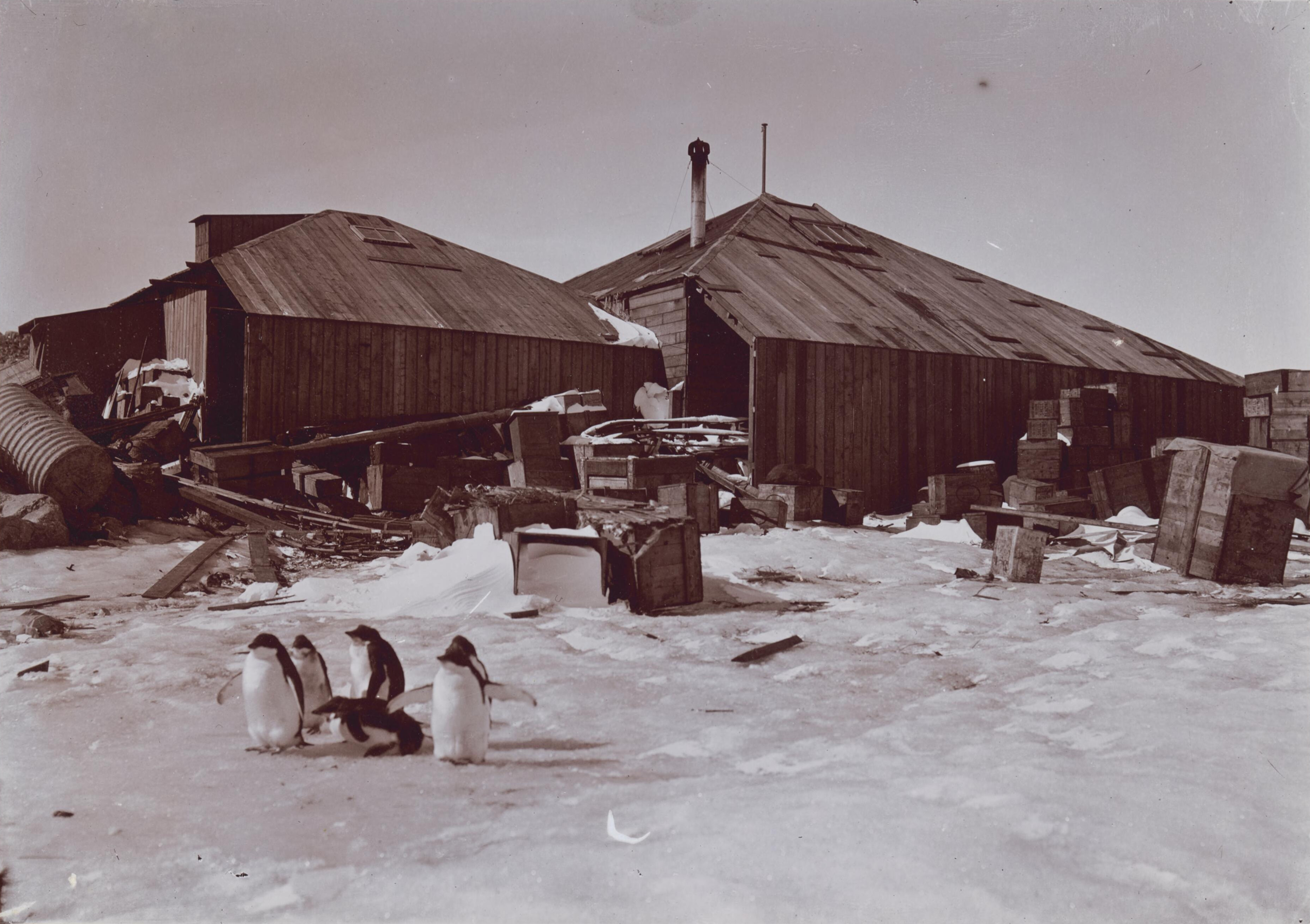
Newly constructed Main Base Hut at Denison

The Australasian Antarctic Expedition 1911–1914 established radio connection back to Tasmania via Macquarie Island, surveyed King George V Land and examined the rock formations of Wilkes Land. Mawson's Huts at Cape Denison survive to the current day as habitations at the expedition's chosen base. The expedition's Western Base Party made several discoveries and explored Kaiser Wilhelm II Land from initial stationing in Queen Mary Land. The territorially acquisitive BANZARE expedition of 1929–1931, additionally collaborating with the UK, mapped the coastline of Antarctica and discovered Mac Robertson Land and Princess Elizabeth Land. Both expeditions reported voluminously.

Aerial crossing of the Tasman was first achieved by Charles Kingsford Smith with Charles Ulm and crew travelling by return journey in 1928, improving upon the failure by Moncrieff and Hood deceased earlier the same year. Guy Menzies then completed a solo crossing in 1931. Rowing crossing was first successfully completed, solo, by Colin Quincey in 1977 and then by teams of kayakers in 2007. A pioneering solo kayak journey from Tasmania by Andrew McAuley in early 2007 ended with his disappearance at sea and presumed death in New Zealand waters 30 nmi short of landfall at Milford Sound.

== Telecommunications ==
Route of the Southern Cross Cable

The first international cable landing on New Zealand soil was that laid in 1876 from La Perouse, New South Wales to Wakapuaka, New Zealand. The major part of that cable was renewed in 1895, and it was withdrawn from service in 1932. A second trans-Tasman submarine cable was laid in 1890 between Sydney and Wellington, New Zealand, and then in 1901, the Pacific Cable from Norfolk Island was landed in Doubtless Bay, North Island. In 1912 a 2,270 km (1,225 nmi) cable was laid from Sydney to Auckland.

The two countries additionally established communication via undersea laid coaxial cable in July 1962, and the NZPO-OTC joint venture TASMAN cable laid in 1975. These were retired by effect of the laying of analogue signal submarine cable linking Australia's Bondi Beach to Takapuna, New Zealand via Norfolk Island in 1983, which itself in turn was supplemented and eventually outmoded by the TASMAN-2 optical fibre cable laid between Paddington, New South Wales and Whenuapai, Auckland in 1995.

The trans-Tasman leg of the high-capacity fibre-optic Southern Cross Cable has been operational from Alexandria, New South Wales to Whenuapai since 2001. Another high-capacity direct linkage was proposed for construction to be operational in 2013, and yet another for early 2014. A 2288 km fibre optic cable went live in March 2017: the Tasman Global Access cable from Ngarunui Beach in Raglan to Narrabeen Beach in Sydney.

== Migration ==
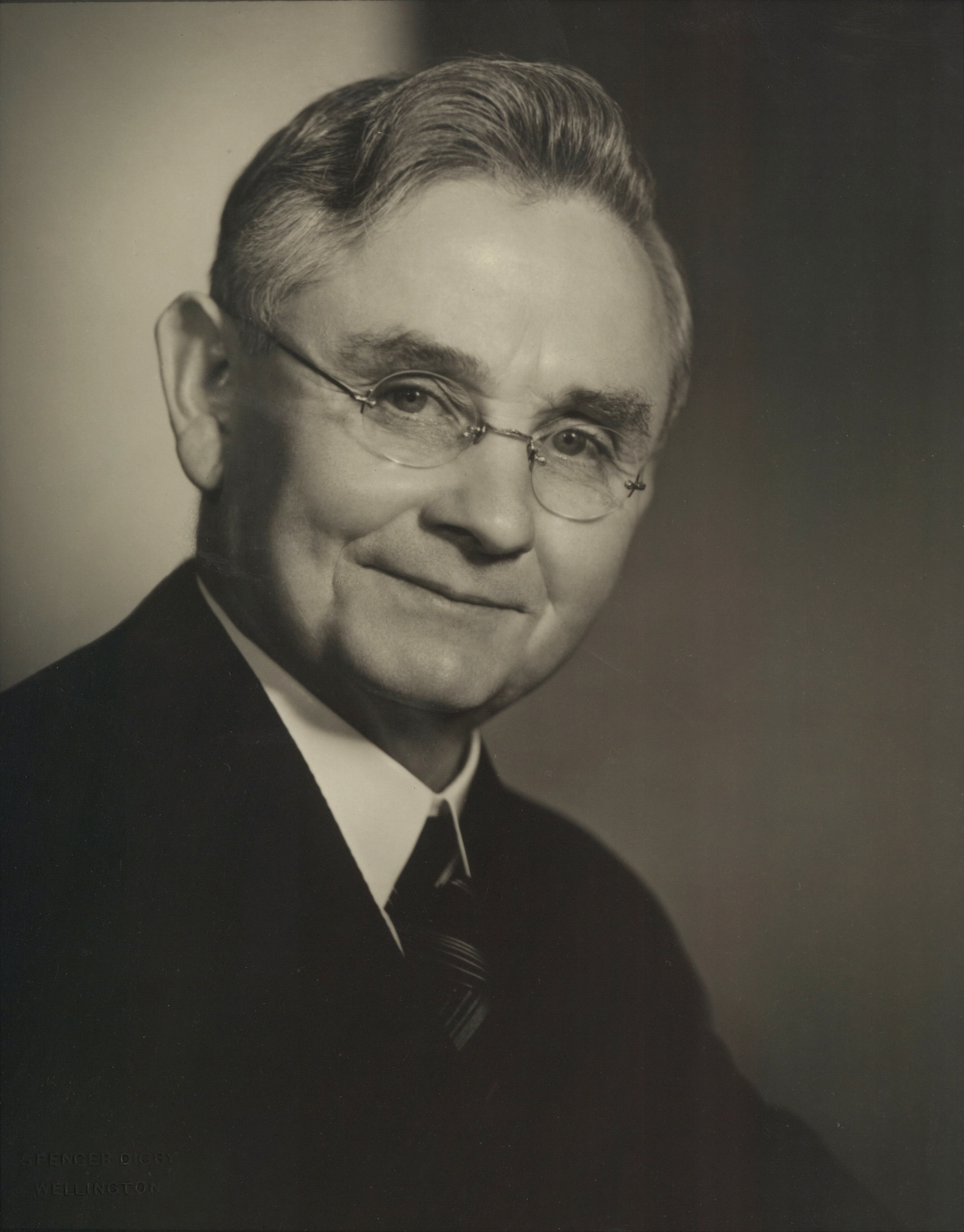
Australian-born Michael Joseph Savage, the first Labour Prime Minister of New Zealand

Since 2023, New Zealanders have been given a fast track to Australian citizenship.

=== Trans-Tasman migration and connections ===
There are many people who have emigrated from New Zealand to Australia, including former Premier of South Australia, Mike Rann, comedian turned psychologist Pamela Stephenson, and actor Russell Crowe. Australians who have emigrated to New Zealand include the 17th and 23rd Prime Ministers of New Zealand Sir Joseph Ward and Michael Joseph Savage, Russel Norman, former co-leader of the Green Party, and Matt Robson, former deputy leader of the Progressive Party.

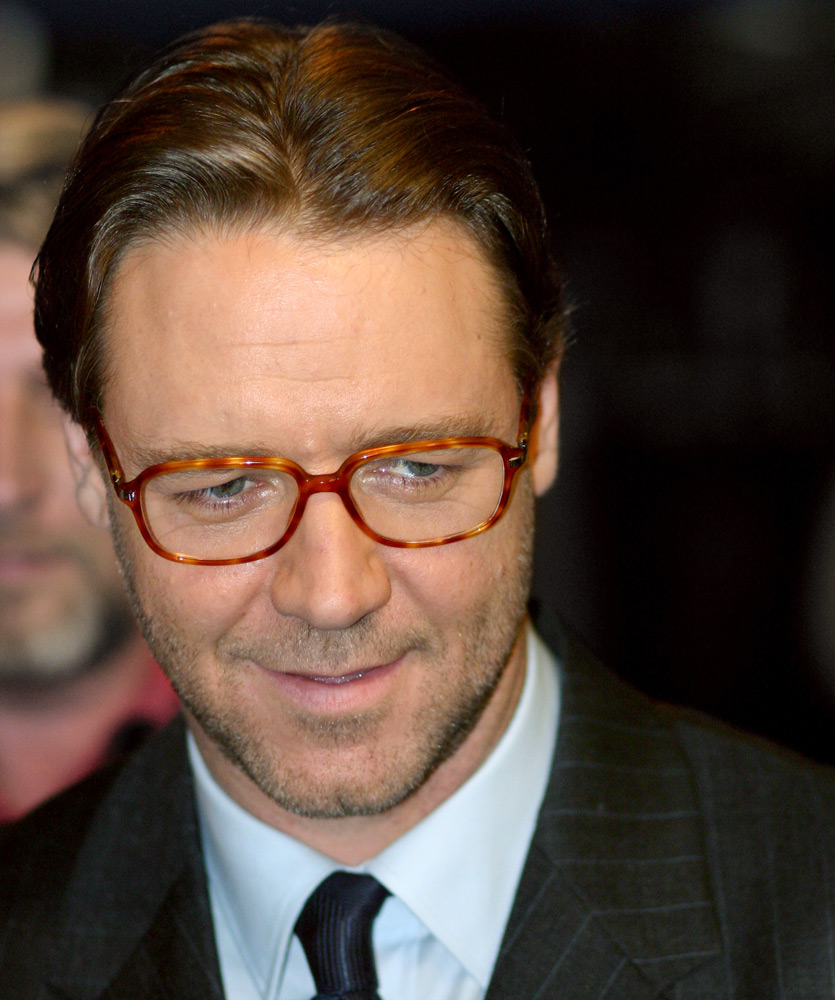
Māori New Zealand-born Australia-based actor and musician Russell Crowe

Under various arrangements since the 1920s, there has been a free flow of people between Australia and New Zealand. Since 1973 the informal Trans-Tasman Travel Arrangement has allowed for the free movement of citizens of one nation to the other. The only major exception to these travel privileges is for individuals with outstanding warrants or criminal backgrounds who are deemed dangerous or undesirable for the migrant nation and its citizens. New Zealand passport holders are issued with special category visas on arrival in Australia, while Australian passport holders are issued with residence class visas on arrival in New Zealand.

In recent decades, many New Zealanders have migrated to Australian cities such as Sydney, Brisbane, Melbourne and Perth. Many such New Zealanders are Māori Australians. Although this agreement is reciprocal there has been resulting significant net migration from New Zealand to Australia. In 2001 there were eight times more New Zealanders living in Australia than Australians living in New Zealand, and in 2006 it was estimated that Australia's real income per person was 32 per cent higher than that of New Zealand and its territories. Comparative surveys of median household incomes also confirm that those incomes are lower in New Zealand than in most of the Australian States and Territories. Visits in each direction exceeded one million in 2009, and there are around half a million New Zealand citizens in Australia and about 65,000 Australians in New Zealand. There have been complaints in New Zealand that there is a clearly manifested brain drain to Australia.

=== Immigration and naturalisation policies ===
Number of permanent settlers arriving in Australia from New Zealand since 1991 (monthly)

New Zealanders in Australia previously had immediate access to Australian welfare benefits and were sometimes characterised as bludgers. In 2001, this was described by New Zealand Prime Minister Helen Clark as a "modern myth". Regulations changed in 2001, whereby New Zealanders must wait two years before being eligible for such payments. All New Zealanders who have moved to Australia after February 2001 are placed on a Special Category Visa, classing them as temporary residents, regardless of how long they reside in Australia. This visa is also passed on to their children. As temporary residents, they are ineligible for government support, student loans, aid, emergency programmes, welfare, public housing and disability support in Australia.

As part of the stricter immigration regulations in 2001, New Zealanders must also acquire permanent residency before applying for Australian citizenship. These stricter immigration requirements have led to a drop in New Zealanders acquiring Australian citizenship. By 2016, only 8.4 per cent of the 146,000 New Zealand–born migrants who arrived in Australia between 2002 and 2011 had acquired Australian citizenship. Of this number, only 3 per cent of New Zealand–born Māori had acquired Australian citizenship. The Victoria University of Wellington researcher Paul Hamer claimed that the 2001 changes were part of an Australian policy of filtering out Pasifika migrants who had acquired New Zealand citizenship and were perceived to be exploiting a "backdoor access" to Australia. Between 2009 and 2016, there was a 42 per cent increase in New Zealand–born prisoners in Australian prisons.

Attempts by the Queensland Government to pass a law that would allow government agencies to deny support based on residency status without it being considered discriminatory were condemned by Queensland's anti-discrimination commission as an attempt to legalise state discrimination against New Zealanders, claiming it would create a "permanent second class of people". Children born to Australians in New Zealand are granted New Zealand citizenship by birth as well as Australian citizenship by descent.

New Zealand Ministry of Education figures show the number of Australians at New Zealand tertiary institutions almost doubled from 1,978 students in 1999 to 3,916 in 2003. In 2004, more than 2700 Australians received student loans, and 1220 received a student allowance. Unlike other overseas students, Australians pay the same fees for higher education as New Zealanders and are eligible for student loans and allowances once they have lived in New Zealand for two years. New Zealand students are not treated on the same basis as Australian students in Australia.

Persons born in New Zealand continue to be the second largest source of immigration to Australia, representing 11% of total permanent additions in 2005–06 and accounting for 2.3% of Australia's population in June 2006. At 30 June 2010, an estimated 566,815 New Zealand citizens were present in Australia.

On 22 April 2023, Australian Prime Minister Anthony Albanese, Home Affairs Minister Clare O'Neil, and Immigration Minister Andrew Giles announced the creation of a new direct pathway to Australian citizenship, commencing 1 July 2023. Under the policy, Special Category Visa holders will be able to apply for Australian citizenship without having to apply for permanent residency if they meet a four-year residence and other residency requirements. In addition, children born in Australia to a New Zealander from 1 July 2023 will automatically be eligible for Australian citizenship. The announcement was welcomed by New Zealand Prime Minister Chris Hipkins and Oz Kiwi chairperson Joanne Cox for improving New Zealanders' access to Australian citizenship, health and social security services.

By 15 August 2023, over 15,000 New Zealand citizens residing in Australia had applied for Australian citizenship under the new criteria, with 500 passing the Australian citizenship test at the time of publication. According to The Guardian, New Zealanders accounted for half of Australian citizenship applications since 1 July 2023. 35% of applicants came from Queensland, 30% from Victoria, and 20% from New South Wales.

=== Section 501 "character test" ===
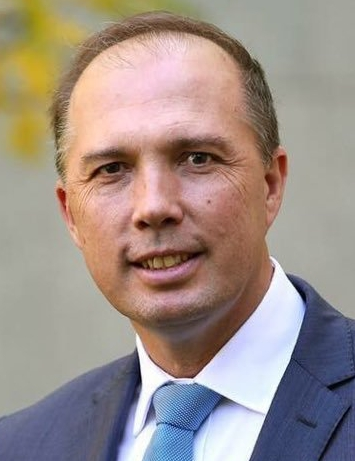
Peter Dutton, Australian Minister for Home Affairs, who introduced the new "character test" in December 2014

In December 2014, Peter Dutton assumed the portfolio of Australian Minister for Immigration and Border Protection following a cabinet reshuffle. That same month, the Australian Government amended the Migration Act 1958 that facilitates the cancellation of Australian visas for non-citizens who have served for more than twelve months in an Australian prison or if immigration authorities believe that they pose a threat to the country. This stricter character test also targets non-citizens who have lived in Australia for most of their lives and have family there. As of July 2018, about 1,300 New Zealanders have been deported since January 2015 under the new section 501 "character test." Of the deported New Zealanders, at least 60 per cent were of Māori and Pacific Islander ethnicity. While Australian officials have justified the deportations on law and order grounds, New Zealand officials have contended that such measures damage the "historic bonds of mateship" between the two countries.

Following a meeting between New Zealand Prime Minister John Key and Australian Prime Minister Tony Abbott in February 2015, the Australian Government agreed to give New Zealand more warning about the repatriation of deported criminals so that NZ authorities could better manage "at-risk" deportees. In October 2015, Abbott's successor Malcolm Turnbull reached an agreement with Key to allow New Zealanders detained at Australian immigration detention centres to fly home while they appealed their visa applications and to fast-track the application process.

The Fifth National Government also passed Returning Offenders (Management and Information) Act 2015 in November 2015, which established a strict monitoring returning for section 501 returnees. The law allows the chief executive of the Department of Corrections to apply to a district court for special conditions on returning prisoners, including submitting "identifying particulars" such as photographs and fingerprints. While the Returning Offenders Act's strict monitoring regime reduced recidivism rates from 58% in November 2015 to 38% by March 2018, the New Zealand Law Society expressed concern that the Act potentially violated the New Zealand Bill of Rights Act 1990 by imposing "retroactive penalties and double jeopardy" on former offenders.

In February 2016, Turnbull and Key reached an agreement to give New Zealanders in Australia a pathway to citizenship if they had been earning above the average wage for five years. In July 2017, the Australian Government introduced the "Skilled Independent visa (subclass 189)" which allows New Zealanders who have been Australian residents for five years to apply for citizenship after 12 months. The visa also requires applicants to maintain an annual income over A$53,900 and gives New Zealanders more access to welfare services. Between 60,000 and 80,000 New Zealanders are eligible for the new visa. This new visa reflected a policy shift to prioritise non-citizen New Zealanders residing in Australia over Asian migrants from overseas. According to figures from the Australian Home Affairs Department obtained by the Australian Broadcasting Corporation (ABC), 1,512 skilled independent visas had been issued by late February 2018, with another 7,500 visas still being processed. Australian Greens immigration spokesperson Nick McKim criticised the new immigration policy as a stealth effort by Immigration Minister Dutton to favour "English-speaking, white and wealthy" migrants. In addition, the new visa scheme was criticised by the "Ozkiwi lobby" since two thirds of New Zealanders living in Australia earned less than the qualifying rate. The Turnbull government subsequently overturned the Skilled Independent visa in 2017.

In February 2018, an Australian Parliamentary Joint Committee recommended that Australian migration laws be amended to facilitate the removal of non-citizens under the age of 18 years. Despite concerns raised by New Zealand Prime Minister Jacinda Ardern and Foreign Minister Winston Peters, the Turnbull government refused to budge on its 501 deportation policy. By May 2018, the Australian Government had accelerated its 501 deportation policy by deporting individuals based on Dutton's ministerial discretion and repatriating adolescent offenders. In addition, Section 116 of the Migration Act 1958 also gave the Australian Immigration Minister the power to cancel the visas of lesser offenders without considering their ties to Australia. Between 2017 and 2019, there was a 400% increase in visa cancellations under Section 116 for offences that did not meet the Section 501 criteria.

In mid-July 2018, the effect of Australia's controversial new "character" test was the subject of a controversial ABC documentary by Peter FitzSimons entitled "Don't Call Australia Home." While the New Zealand Justice Minister Andrew Little criticised the high deportation rate as a breach of human rights, the Australian Immigration Minister Dutton defended Australia's right to deport "undesirable" non-citizens. The ABC report was criticised by several Coalition Ministers including the now-Minister for Home Affairs Dutton and Assistant Minister of Home Affairs Alex Hawke for ignoring the crimes and victims of the deportees. Hawke also criticised Little for not warning New Zealand nationals to obey Australian law. In response, Little criticised Australia's deportation laws for lacking "humanitarian ideals." In response, Dutton vowed to continue deporting non-citizen criminals and criticised New Zealand for not doing enough to assist Australian naval patrols intercepting the "people smugglers."

The documentary's release coincided with the release of a 17-year-old New Zealand youth from an Australian detention centre, who had successfully appealed against his deportation. The New Zealand Government expressed concern about the deportation of the teenager since minors under the age of 18 years were not covered by the adult deportees' monitoring regime. In response, Oranga Tamariki (the Ministry of Children) began developing an "inter-departmental plan" to handle the repatriation of adolescent offenders.

On 25 October 2018, the Australian Immigration Minister David Coleman introduced the Migration Amendment (Strengthening the Character Test) Bill 2018 in response to reports that some judges had reduced criminal sentences to avoid triggering the Section 501 threshold for mandatory visa cancellations. The proposed Bill did not explicitly differentiate between adult and under-18-year-old offenders. Despite opposition from New Zealand High Commissioner Annette King, the Law Council of Australia, Australian Human Rights Commission, and the United Nations High Commissioner for Refugees (UNHCR), the Migration Amendment Bill 2018 progressed to its first reading on 25 October. However, the bill lapsed following the dissolution of the Australian Parliament prior to the 2019 Australian federal election in April 2019.

In late February 2020, Prime Minister Ardern criticised Australia's policy of deporting New Zealanders as "corrosive", saying that it was testing the relationship between the two countries. In response, the Australian Prime Minister Scott Morrison defended Australia's right to deport non-citizens. Dutton also defended the Australian Government's deportation policy, suggesting that Arden was playing to the New Zealand electoral cycle. In response, Ardern described Dutton's policy as regrettable and described her remarks as a defence of New Zealand's "principled position."

In mid-February 2021, Ardern criticised the Australian Government's decision to revoke dual New Zealand–Australian national Suhayra Aden's Australian citizenship. Aden was an ISIS bride who had migrated from New Zealand to Australia at the age of six, acquiring Australian citizenship. She subsequently travelled to Syria to live in the Islamic State. On 15 February 2021, Aden and two of her children were detained by Turkish authorities after illegally crossing the border. In response, Morrison defended the decision to revoke Aden's citizenship, citing legislation stripping dual nationals of their Australian citizenship if they were engaged in terrorist activities. Following a phone conversation, Ardern and Morrison agreed to work together in the "spirit of the relationship" to address what the former described as "quite a complex legal situation." In late May 2021, Morrison defended the revocation of Aden's citizenship but indicated that Canberra was open to allowing her children to settle in Australia. In mid–August 2021, Aden and her children were repatriated to New Zealand.

Non-citizens in Australia facing visa cancellation can appeal to the Australian Administrative Appeals Tribunal (AAT), which hears visa cancellation appeals. However, the Minister of Home Affairs has the discretionary power to set aside AAT decisions. In December 2019, the New Zealand media company Stuff reported that 80% of appeals to the AAT were rejected or affirmed the Australian Government's visa cancellation orders. In January 2021, TVNZ's 1News reported that 25% of New Zealand nationals facing deportation under the 501 "character test" had successfully appealed against their deportations to the Administrative Appeals Tribunal. These figures included 21 in the 2019–2020 financial year and 38 in the 2020–2021 financial year.

The repatriation of New Zealanders under the 501 character test policy has contributed to a surge in criminal activity in New Zealand. In December 2019, Stuff reported that several repatriated senior members of Australian bikie gangs, including the Comanchero and Mongols had expanded their operations in New Zealand; contributing to a surge in gang membership and the methamphetamine black market. By early March 2022, 2,544 New Zealanders had been deported from Australia, which accounted for 96% of deportations to New Zealand since 2015. According to Newshub, former 501 deportees accounted for more than 8,000 offences since 2015. These included over 2,000 dishonesty convictions, 1,387 violent crime convictions, 861 drug and anti-social behaviour offences, and 57 sexual crime offences. Both Police Commissioner Andrew Coster and New Zealand National Party leader Christopher Luxon have attributed the rapid surge in gang membership and organised crime between 2018 and 2022 to repatriated 501 deportees.

Following the 2022 Australian federal election held on 21 May 2022, Ardern announced that she would press the newly elected Prime Minister Anthony Albanese's government on the 501 deportation policy. While Albanese indicated that Section 501 deportation policy would remain, he expressed an openness to amending the policy to recognise the amount of time a person had spent in Australia. On 10 June 2022, Ardern raised New Zealand's concerns during a state visit to Canberra. In response, Albanese reiterated that he would look at addressing New Zealand's concerns about the impact of the policy on its citizens.

On 8 July, Albanese stated during a meeting with Ardern that his government would commit to amending the Section 501 policy to consider prospective deportees' long-term connections to Australia. In addition, Albanese stated that he would explore expanding voting rights to New Zealanders residing in Australia and pathways for allowing New Zealanders residing in Australia to acquire Australian citizenship. In response, Shadow Home Affairs Minister Karen Andrews expressed concerns that modifying the Section 501 policy would allow foreign criminals to remain in Australia, endangering public safety and security.

On 20 December 2022, High Court Judge Cheryl Gwyn ruled in favour of a former 501 deportee known as "G," who challenged the Government's authority to impose special conditions upon his return to New Zealand. She ruled that special conditions such as ordering "G" to reside at a particular address, supplying fingerprints and DNA, and attending rehabilitative and treatment programmes violated the New Zealand Bill of Rights Act 1990 and constituted an act of double jeopardy since he had already served time for crimes in Australia which had led to his repatriation to New Zealand. Gwyn's decision has implications for the monitoring regime for deportees established under the framework of the Returning Offenders (Management and Information) Act 2015. On 21 December, the Crown Law Office appealed against Gwyn's High Court ruling, citing its implications for the Returning Offenders Act's monitoring regime.

In early February 2023, Immigration Minister Andrew Giles confirmed that the Australian Government would maintain the 501 deportation policy but would consider the length of time they had lived in Australia and connections to the Australian community. This directive was known as Ministerial Direction 99 and stated that immigration officials and the Administrative Appeals Tribunal had to consider a person's communal ties and time spent in Australia before cancelling a visa. While New Zealand Prime Minister Chris Hipkins welcomed these changes, deportee advocate Filipa Payne argued that these changes were insufficient since they preserved mandatory detention and allowed for the deportation of "dangerous" individuals."

In late May 2024, Albanese and Giles announced that the Australian Government would rewrite Ministerial Directive 99 following criticism from Shadow immigration minister Dan Tehan and Opposition Leader Peter Dutton that the ministerial direction had allowed several non-citizens convicted of serious crimes including rape, drug smuggling, kidnapping and serious assault to remain in Australia. In one notable case, a New Zealander known as "CHCY" had been allowed by the Administrative Appeals Tribunal to keep his visa despite being convicted of the rape of his teenage stepdaughter. In response to Australian plans to rewrite Ministerial Directive 99, New Zealand Foreign Minister Winston Peters and Prime Minister Christopher Luxon expressed concern that the policy revision would lead to the deportation of New Zealanders with little connection to New Zealand but said they would work with their Australian counterparts to address New Zealand's concerns. On 7 June, Giles issued a revised ministerial directive called "Direction 110" which stated that violent non-citizen criminals could be deported even if they had lived their whole lives in Australia. As a result, Giles reinstated the visa cancellations for 40 individuals who had previously had their visa cancellations overturned under the previous Directive 99. While Luxon responded that Australia was "well within its rights" to make its own rules, but also said, "it's just not right that people who have no connection to New Zealand are deported to New Zealand."

=== COVID-19 pandemic ===
On 30 March 2020, Australian Prime Minister Morrison announced that New Zealanders living in Australia under the Special Category Visa (subclass 444) would be eligible for AU$1,500 fortnightly payments following negotiations with his New Zealand counterpart, Prime Minister Ardern. Thousands of New Zealanders, who were unemployed due to the COVID-19 pandemic, had been forced to leave Australia after finding they were ineligible for Centrelink payments.

On 5 May, the Australian federal government, New Zealand government, and several Australian state and territorial governments announced that they would work together to develop a trans-Tasman COVID-safe travel zone that would allow residents from both countries to travel freely without travel restrictions as part of efforts to ease coronavirus restrictions.

On 2 October 2020, Prime Minister Morrison announced that the Australian Government had formalised a deal allowing New Zealanders "one-way quarantine-free travel" into New South Wales and the Northern Territory from 16 October as part of initial steps to establish a "travel bubble" between the two countries. However, New Zealand Prime Minister Jacinda Ardern has ruled out extending reciprocal "quarantine-free travel" for Australians to contain the spread of COVID-19 into New Zealand.

On 16 October, the trans-Tasman travel bubble went into effect, whereby travellers from New Zealand were able to go to New South Wales, the Australian Capital Territory, and the Northern Territory without having to quarantine upon arrival. However, the arrangement was not reciprocal – Australian travellers still had to quarantine for 14 days upon arrival in New Zealand. The trans-Tasman bubble was extended to Queensland on 12 December 2020.

On 14 December 2020, the New Zealand Prime Minister Ardern announced that the New Zealand Government had approved plans to establish a quarantine-free travel bubble with Australia in the first quarter of 2021. Australian Health Minister Greg Hunt welcomed the move, describing it as the "first step" in normalising international travel and reiterated the Australian Government's support for measures to establish the travel bubble.

=== Refugee resettlement ===
In February 2013, the New Zealand Prime Minister John Key and Australian Prime Minister Julia Gillard signed an agreement for New Zealand to accept several asylum seekers who had travelled to Australia by sea. As part of the agreement, 150 refugees would be resettled in New Zealand each year, commencing in 2014. These asylum seekers would come from Australia as well as the offshore processing centres in Papua New Guinea and Nauru.

In early November 2017, the Australian Prime Minister Malcolm Turnbull turned down an offer by his New Zealand counterpart Jacinda Ardern to resettle 150 asylum seekers from Nauru and Manus Island in New Zealand because Australia was pursuing a refugee resettlement deal with the United States. Australian Immigration Minister Peter Dutton also claimed that the New Zealand offer would encourage more people smugglers to travel from New Zealand to Australia. This offer coincided with Australian efforts to close down the Manus Regional Processing Centre. Dutton also warned that the proposed New Zealand offer could damage bilateral relations between the two countries.

On 24 March 2022, the New Zealand and Australian Governments reached an agreement to accept New Zealand's earlier 2013 offer to take in asylum seekers housed at the Nauru Regional Processing Centre or residing temporarily in Australia for "processing." Refugees being resettled in New Zealand will have to go through the United Nations High Commissioner for Refugees (UNHCR) process and meet the criteria for NZ's refugee quota requirements. As part of the deal, 450 refugees would be resettled in New Zealand over three years. Subsequent Australian governments had declined to accept New Zealand's offer due to concerns that it would encourage more asylum seekers to travel by boat to Australia and that former asylum seekers could gain New Zealand citizenship and migrate to Australia.

=== Suhayra Aden ===
Formerly a dual citizen, Suhayra Aden was stripped of her Australian citizenship in 2020 as a result of allegedly engaging in terrorism. The move was announced and defended by Australian Prime Minister Scott Morrison; it was met with scepticism internationally and uproar in New Zealand. Australia has a history of deporting non-citizens who have committed crimes or breached their "character test," regardless of whether they have only ever committed crimes in Australia, or if they spent virtually their whole lives in Australia. New Zealand Prime Minister Jacinda Ardern accused Morrison's government of trying to abandon Aden (who had lived in Australia since the age of 6 before allegedly joining ISIL) so New Zealand would have to deal with her and the associated expenses instead. Following a phone conversation, the two leaders agreed to work together in the "spirit of the Australian-New Zealand relationship" to address what Ardern called "quite a complex legal situation." On 26 July 2021, Ardern announced that Cabinet had agreed to repatriate Aden and her two children on the basis of their status as New Zealand citizens. Aden and her two children will be the first New Zealanders to be repatriated from Syria allegedly associated with ISIL. In mid-August 2021, Aden and her two children landed in New Zealand.

=== Human capital flight ===
In late October 2023, RNZ reported that Australian police forces were recruiting New Zealand Police personnel by offering lucrative pay and housing packages. By 30 October, figures released by Australian police showed that 77 former NZ police had migrated to Queensland while almost 20 had migrated to the Northern Territory. NZ Police Association president Chris Cahill estimated that 3,000 New Zealand police officers had immigrated to Australia in the past six years. By mid-March 2024, The New Zealand Herald reported that 50 of the 200 former NZ police officers who had resigned in 2023 were already working as police officers in Australia. The Herald reported that another 70 police officers were planning to emigrate from New Zealand, having been enticed by tax-free sign-on fees and relocation costs of up to $25,000.

In August 2023, NZ Police deputy commissioner Wally Haumaha sought to downplay concerns that New Zealand could lose a lot of Māori police officers to Australia, claiming that many New Zealand emigrants "get mokemoke (homesick) for whānau (family) and end coming back to the NZ Police as rejoins." In April 2024, Police Minister Mark Mitchell admitted that New Zealand was unable to compete with Australian police job officers, saying that "we cannot compete with that. Australia has got a much bigger and a healthier, and stronger high-wage economy than we have, and that's one of the big jobs that we've got as the incoming government is to strengthen our economy and start to head towards being a higher wage economy that at least goes some way towards competing with Australia."

== Trade ==
Monthly value of Australian merchandise exports to New Zealand (A$ millions) since 1988

Monthly value of New Zealand merchandise exports to Australia (A$ millions) since 1988

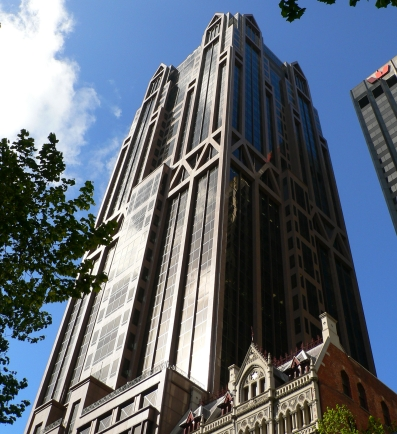
Australia and New Zealand Banking Group World Headquarters in Melbourne, Australia. The banking group is the successor of the Bank of Australasia formed by Royal Charter in London in 1835.

New Zealand's economic ties with Australia are strong, especially since the demise of Britain as a trading partner following the latter's decision to join the European Economic Community in 1973. Effective from 1 January 1983, the two countries concluded the Australia-New Zealand Closer Economic Relations Trade Agreement (ANZCERTA) for the purpose of allowing each country access to the other's markets. Two-way trade between Australia and New Zealand was NZ$26.2 billion (approximately A$24.1 billion) in 2017–18, including goods and services. New Zealand's largest exports to Australia are travel and tourism, dairy products, foodstuffs, precious metals and jewellery, and machinery. Australia's largest exports to New Zealand are travel and tourism, machinery, inorganic chemicals, vehicles, foodstuffs, and paper products.

Flowing from the implementation of the ANZCERTA:

- By agreement from 1988, there will be consultation between the respective governments as part of any variation to industry assistance measures and work towards harmonisation of common administrative procedures for quarantine
- additional services were brought within the Agreement's scope from January 1989
- remaining tariffs and quantitative restrictions in bilateral trade were eliminated prior to 1 July 1990
- from 1991 under the Joint Accreditation System of Australia and New Zealand, JAS-ANZ has existed as the joint authority for the accreditation of conformity assessment bodies in the fields of certification and inspection; also, a Government Procurement Agreement was reached and legislation to establish Food Standards Australia New Zealand was promulgated that year.
- a double taxation agreement was sealed in 1995
- Co-operation to harmonise customs policies and procedures has existed since 1996
- agreement on food inspection measures was reached in 1996
- from 1998 goods that may legally be sold in either country may be sold in the other and a person who is registered to practise an occupation in either country is entitled to practise an equivalent occupation in the other. A Reciprocal Health Care Agreement was reached in the same year.
- The Consultative Group on Biosecurity Cooperation was established in 1999 to function as a high-level Trans-Tasman dialogue convening and reporting annually
- an "Open Skies Agreement" effective from November 2000 committed to the enjoyment of all freedoms of the air by airlines operating out of places in either country and the existence of an Australia–New Zealand aviation and air safety common market
- an MOU on business law co-ordination was reached in 2000
- a social security agreement was reached in 2001
- a joint food standards code issued in 2002
- from October 2002 the Pacific Agreement on Closer Economic Relations (PACER) inclusive of the two countries plus the Forum Island Countries has taken effect
- trans-Tasman imputation reform occurred in 2003
- revised rules of origin took effect in 2007 with a review by the end of 2009 and a transitional implementation period extending to the end of 2011
- a revised Australia New Zealand Government Procurement Agreement entered into force in 2008
- the Joint Statement of Intent: Single Economic Market Outcome Framework issued in August 2009 and has been subsequently worked upon
- the Agreement Establishing the ASEAN Australia New Zealand Free Trade Area came into force on 1 January 2010
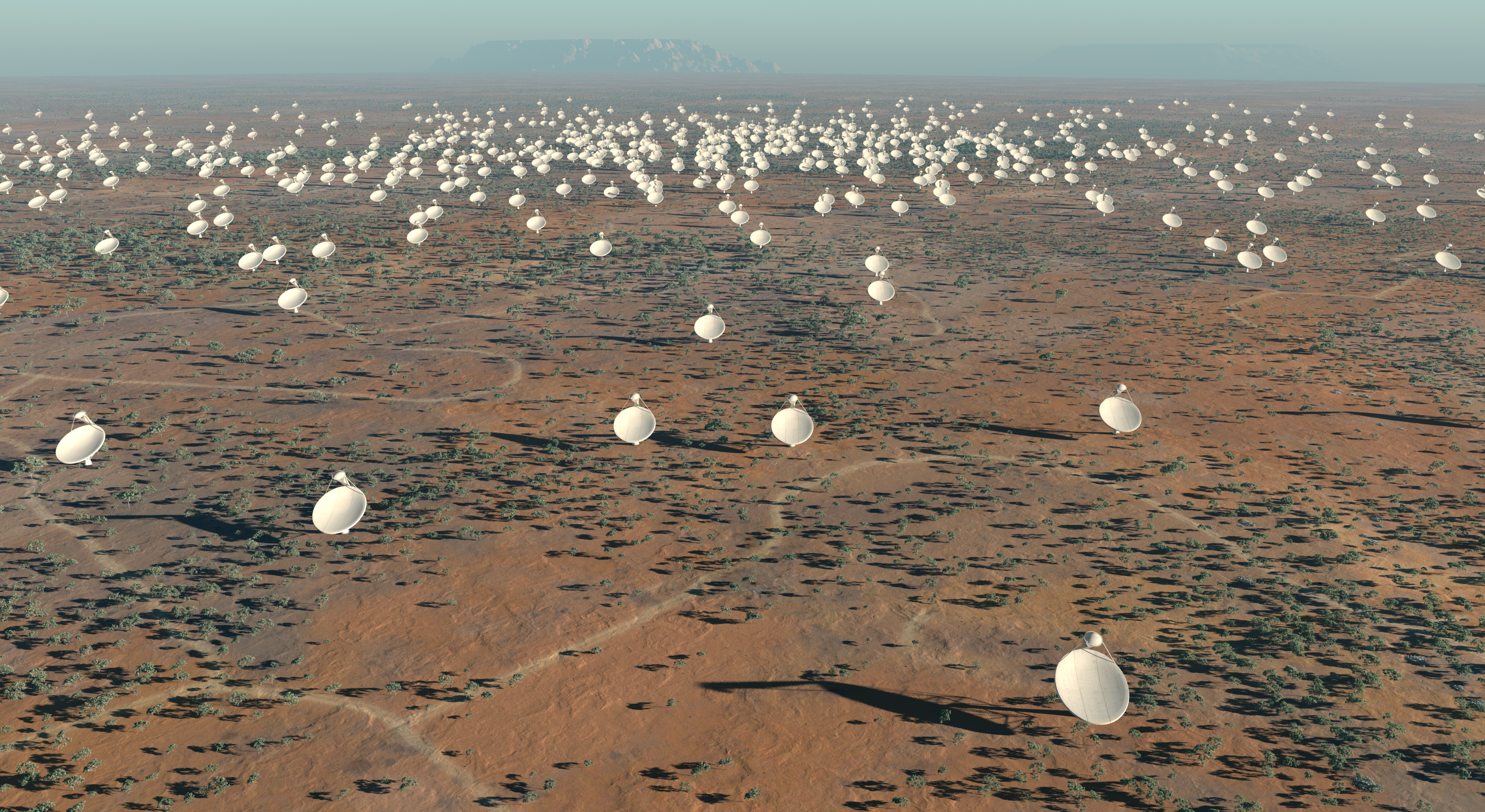
  Artist's impression of SKA central core
- a business-initiated and AUSTRADE/InvestmentNZ-sponsored first joint Australia–New Zealand Investment Conference was held in Auckland in March 2010
- revisions to the Joint Food Standards Treaty came into force in June 2010
- A revised MOU on Coordination of Business Law was signed in 2010
- A commitment for the two countries to jointly bid for hosting the Square Kilometre Array of exploratory radio telescopes has been resolved, and telescopes in the two countries have already successfully been linked for VLBI experimentation
- CER Ministerial Forums have been held annually with an occurrence as recent as June 2010 at which investigation into trans-Tasman mobile roaming arrangements was identified as an issue of priority concern along with co-operation for the international enforcement of understandings and controls on logging, emissions and other environmental matters
- from 30 June 2010, commencing with The Hon. Tim Groser, New Zealand's Minister for Trade is invited to membership of what was formerly Australia's Ministerial Council on International Trade

One example of a formerly longstanding trading issue unresolved by the closer economic relations was Australia's restriction of the import of apples from New Zealand owing to fear of introducing fire blight disease. A ban on the importation of New Zealand apples into Australia had been in place since 1921, following the discovery of fire blight in New Zealand in 1919. New Zealand authorities applied for re-admittance to the Australian market in 1986, 1989 and 1995, but the ban continued. Further talks over Australia's import restrictions on apples from New Zealand failed, and New Zealand initiated WTO dispute resolution proceedings in 2007. Only in 2010 did the WTO order Australia, over its sustained appeals and objections, to vary those import restrictions.

The Australia New Zealand Leadership Forum is a business-led initiative designed to further develop Australia and New Zealand's bilateral relationship as well as their joint relations in the region. The ninth and most recent such convened on 9 April 2011.

== Monetary ==
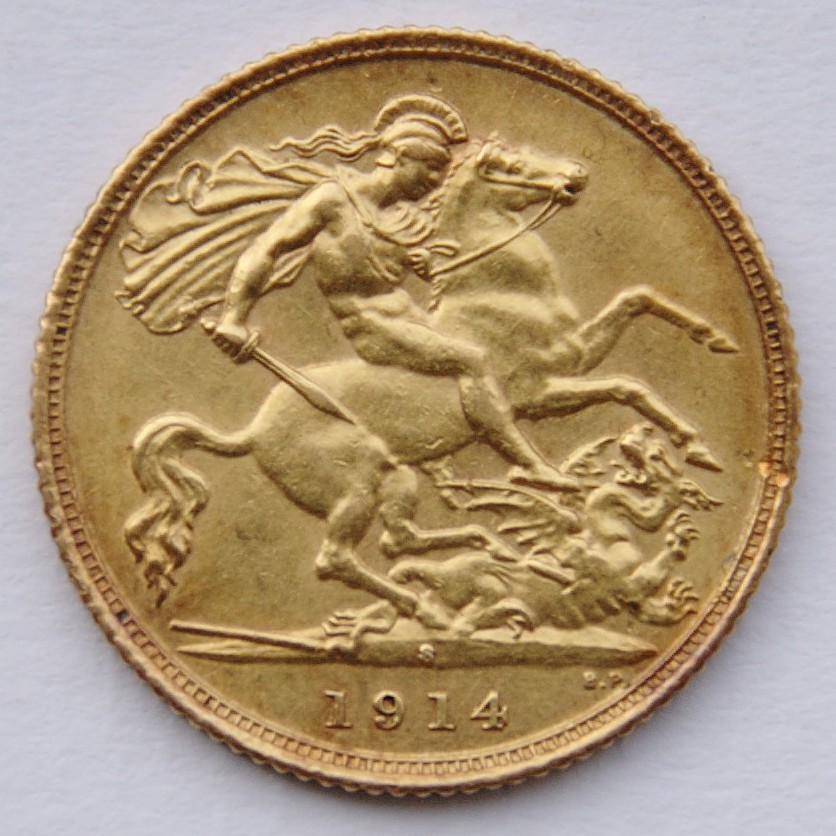
1914 half sovereign from the Sydney mint

Political conditions in the aftermath of the Battle of Waterloo in 1815, smoothed the informal adoption of the British Pound Sterling in New South Wales with relative ease, such adoption proceeding to expand out to New Zealand and other regions of Oceania in time. Having adopted a successful Gold Specie Standard in 1821, the British Government decided in 1825 to introduce the sterling coinage to all of its colonies as a matter of policy. From the latter half of the 19th century until the outbreak of World War I, a monetary union, based on the British gold sovereign, existed in a part of the British Empire which included all of both countries and their dependencies.

In 1910, Australia introduced its own currency in the likeness of sterling currency. The Great Depression was the catalyst that forced more dramatic shifts in the exchange rates between the various pound units, and hence the introduction of the New Zealand pound in 1933. Both national currencies had membership of the sterling area from 1939 until its effective demise in 1972. Both adjusted their peg to be the US dollar in 1971, with first Australia and then New Zealand having fortuitously already decimalised their monetary units on 14 February 1966 and 10 July 1967 respectively, both replacing the pound with the dollar at a rate of £1 to $2. The Australian dollar was floated in December 1983, as subsequently also was the New Zealand dollar in March 1985.

Contemporary dollarisation by either country to the currency of the other or the more involved currency union entailing amalgamation of the central banks and economic regulatory systems of both countries have been proposed and discussed, though in no way implemented.

== Law ==
Both nations adhere to secular common law legal systems, acknowledging the rule of law; and the separation of powers. Like the United States and Canada, however, Australia is a federal nation with a written constitution. New Zealand, like the United Kingdom, is a unitary state with parliamentary sovereignty. Australia lacks a treaty with its indigenous peoples, whereas New Zealand has had the Treaty of Waitangi since 1840. In acknowledgement of indigenous land rights, including aboriginal title, the National Native Title Tribunal and Waitangi Tribunal in the respective nations take similar jurisdiction and powers.

Both judicial systems are now independent of the ultimate authority of the Judicial Committee of the Privy Council. Whereas the Constitution of New Zealand is not either codified or entrenched, the Constitution of Australia has had the Commonwealth of Australia Constitution Act as such an entrenched codification embodying a written constitution. New Zealand contract law is now largely distinct from that of Australia due to the effect of Acts of the New Zealand Parliament promulgated since 1969. Main among them is the wide discretionary power given to New Zealand courts in granting relief.

In 2005 and 2006 the Australian House of Representatives Standing Committee on Legal and Constitutional Affairs enquired into the harmonisation of legal systems within Australia, and with New Zealand, with particular reference to those differences that affect trade and commerce. The Committee stated that the already close relationship between Australia and New Zealand should be closer still and that:

In this era of globalisation, it makes sense for Australia and New Zealand to look at moving closer together and further aligning their regulatory frameworks.

Key recommendations on the Australia–New Zealand relationship included:

- Establishment of a trans-Tasman parliamentary committee to monitor legal harmonisation and examine options including closer association or union;
- Pursuit of a common currency;
- Offering New Zealand Ministers full membership of Australian ministerial councils;
- Work to advance harmonisation of the two banking and telecommunications regulation frameworks.

== New Zealand as an Australian state ==
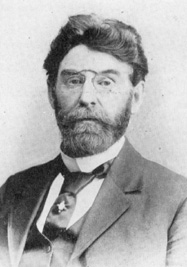
King O'Malley

The 1901 Australian Constitution included provisions to allow New Zealand to join Australia as its seventh state, even after the government of New Zealand had already decided against such a move. The sixth of the initial defining and covering clauses in part provides that:

'The States' shall mean such of the colonies of New South Wales, New Zealand, Queensland, Tasmania, Victoria, Western Australia, and South Australia, including the Northern Territory of South Australia, as for the time being are parts of the Commonwealth, and such colonies or territories as may be admitted into or established by the Commonwealth as States; and each of such parts of the Commonwealth shall be called 'a State'.

One of the reasons that New Zealand chose not to join Australia was due to perceptions that the indigenous Māori population would suffer as a result. At the time of Federation, indigenous Australians were only allowed to vote if they had been previously allowed to in their state of residence, unlike the Māori in New Zealand, who had equal voting rights from the founding of the colony. Moreover, and most ironically, Māori people had voting rights in Australia in certain jurisdictions between 1902 and 1962 as a result of the Commonwealth Franchise Act 1902, part of the effort to allay New Zealand's concerns about joining the Federation. All Indigenous Australians did not have universal suffrage until 1962. During the parliamentary debates over the Act, King O'Malley supported the inclusion of Māori, and the exclusion of Australian Aboriginals, in the franchise, arguing that:

An Aboriginal is not as intelligent as a Maori. There is no scientific evidence that he is a human being at all.

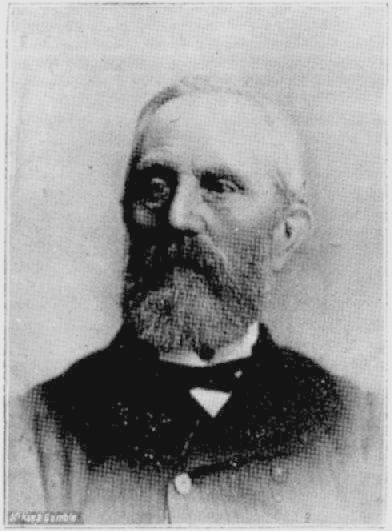
Sir John Hall, Premier of New Zealand 1879–1882

In 1899 negotiations were held by the New Zealand Rugby Football Union and the New South Wales Rugby Football Union attempting to gather their best rugby union footballers into a combined 'Australasia' team to play the touring British Lions in a three Tests series, instead of the Australian side alone. The two Unions could not reach agreement.

From time to time, the idea of joining Australia has been mooted, but has been ridiculed by some New Zealanders. When Australia's former opposition leader, John Hewson, raised the issue in 2000, New Zealand's Prime Minister Helen Clark remarked that he could "dream on". A 2001 book by Australian academic Bob Catley, then at the University of Otago, titled Waltzing with Matilda: should New Zealand join Australia?, was described by New Zealand political commentator Colin James as "a book for Australians".

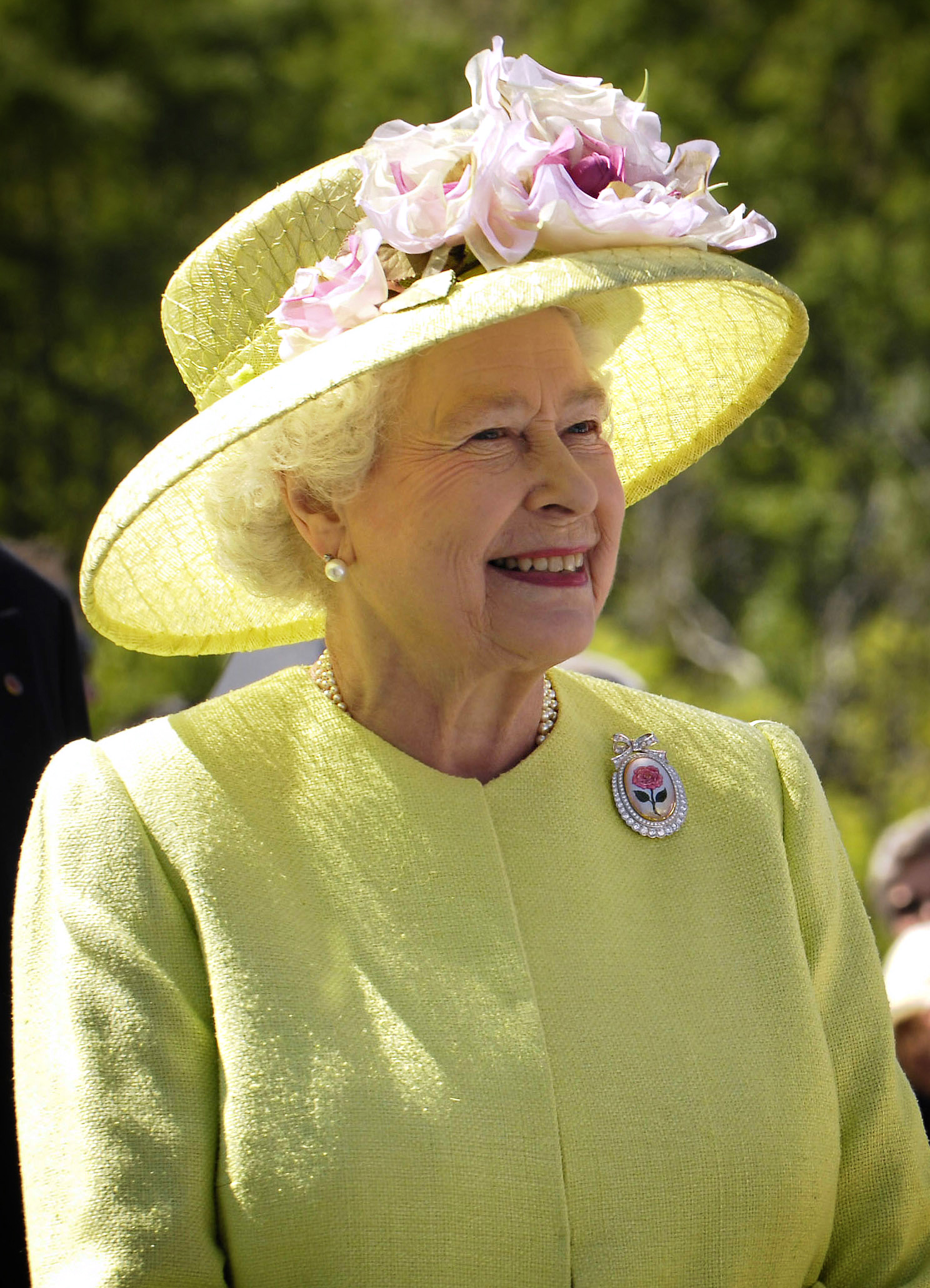
Elizabeth II of the House of Windsor, Queen of Australia and Queen of New Zealand from 6 February 1952 to 8 September 2022

Australia and New Zealand are separated by the Tasman Sea by more than 1,491 km (926 mi). Arguing against Australian statehood, New Zealand's Premier, Sir John Hall, remarked "Nature has made 1,200 impediments to the inclusion of New Zealand in any such federation in the 1,200 miles of stormy ocean which lies between us and our brethren in Australia".

Both countries have contributed to the sporadic discussion on a Pacific Union, although that proposal would include a much wider range of member-states than just Australia and New Zealand. A result of the rejected 1999 Australian republican referendum was that Australians retained a common head of state with New Zealand. Whereas none of the major political parties in New Zealand have a policy of encouraging republicanism, the Australian Labor Party has long favoured a republic, as have some politicians in the Liberal Party, although National Prime Minister Jim Bolger spoke in favour of a republic in 1994.

While there is little prospect of political union now, in 2006 there was a recommendation from an Australian federal parliamentary committee that a full union should occur or Australia and New Zealand should at least have a single currency and more common markets. New Zealand Government submissions to that committee concerning harmonisation of legal systems however noted:

Differences between the legal systems of Australia and New Zealand are not a problem in themselves. The existence of such differences is the inevitable product of well-functioning democratic decision-making processes in each country, which reflect the preferences of stakeholders, and their effective voice in the law-making process.

== Diplomacy ==
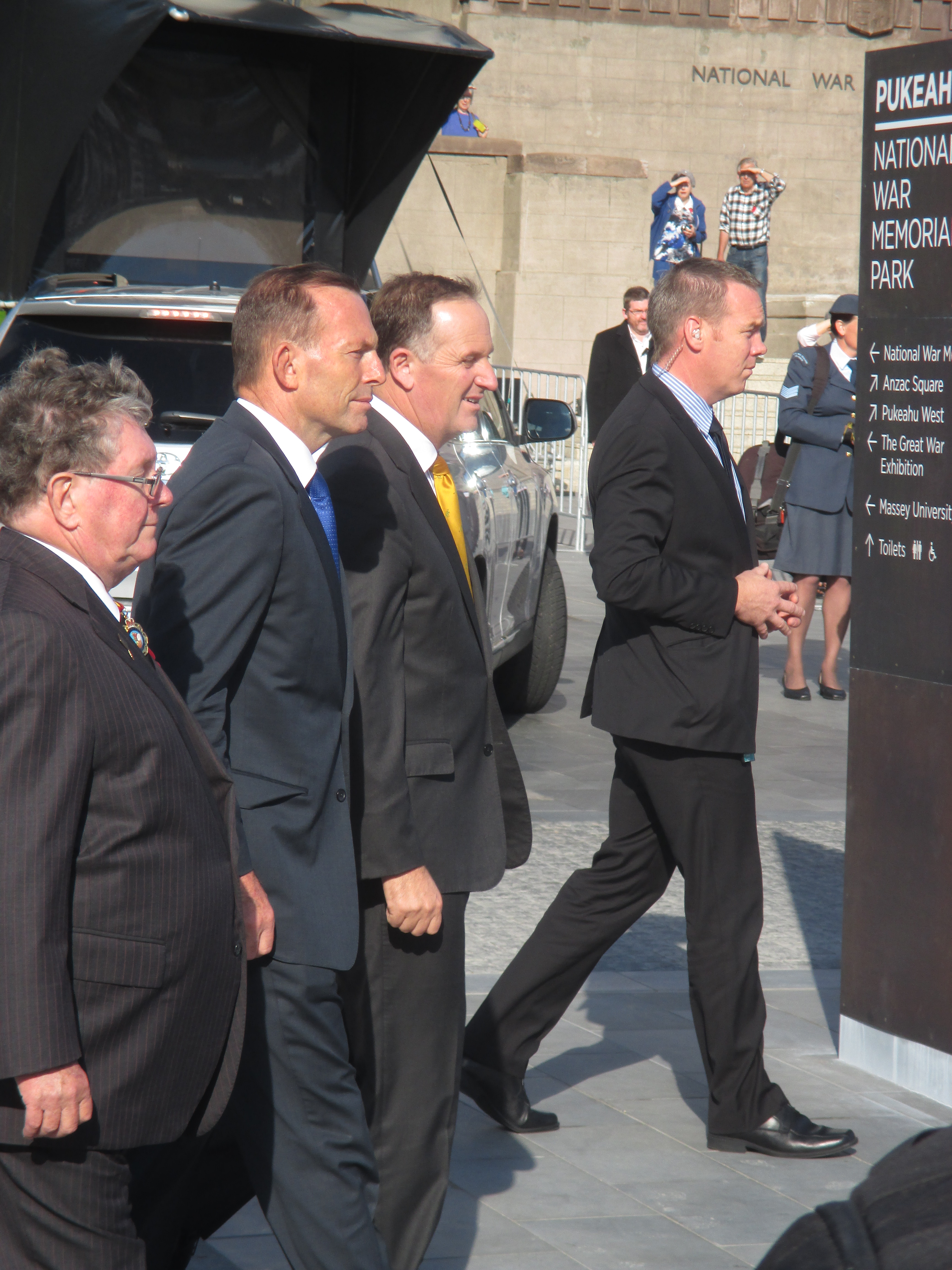
Tony Abbott, then Prime Minister of Australia, and John Key, then Prime Minister of New Zealand, in 2015

The two countries and their colonial precursors have enjoyed unbroken friendly diplomatic relations over the entire period of their coexistence from the early nineteenth century up to the present. They are founding and continuing United Nations member states, and they were formerly founding members of the League of Nations, carrying through for the entire period until its dissolution. There is otherwise a high degree of commonality between Australia's international organisation memberships and those of New Zealand. There is a high degree of commonality in their co-membership of international organisations and their coparticipation as signatories of multilateral treaties of significance. They are conjoint members of several influential trade blocs, forums, military alliances, sharing and interoperability arrangements, and regional associations.

Both are members of the World Trade Organization, APEC, the IAEA, the East Asia Summit, the Pacific Economic Cooperation Council, the Pacific Islands Forum, the ASEAN–Australia–New Zealand Free Trade Area, the Conference on Disarmament, the International Criminal Court, the Organisation for the Prohibition of Chemical Weapons, INTERPOL, WIPO, the International Monetary Fund, the World Bank Group, the Global Initiative to Combat Nuclear Terrorism, the Cairns Group, the Proliferation Security Initiative, the International Hydrographic Organization, the International Maritime Organization, the International Whaling Commission, the International Organization for Migration, the International Seabed Authority, the International Fund for Agricultural Development, the OECD, the Colombo Plan, the Asian Development Bank, the Secretariat of the Pacific Community, the Pacific Regional Environment Programme, and the World Organisation for Animal Health. Both are occasional observers to ASEAN.

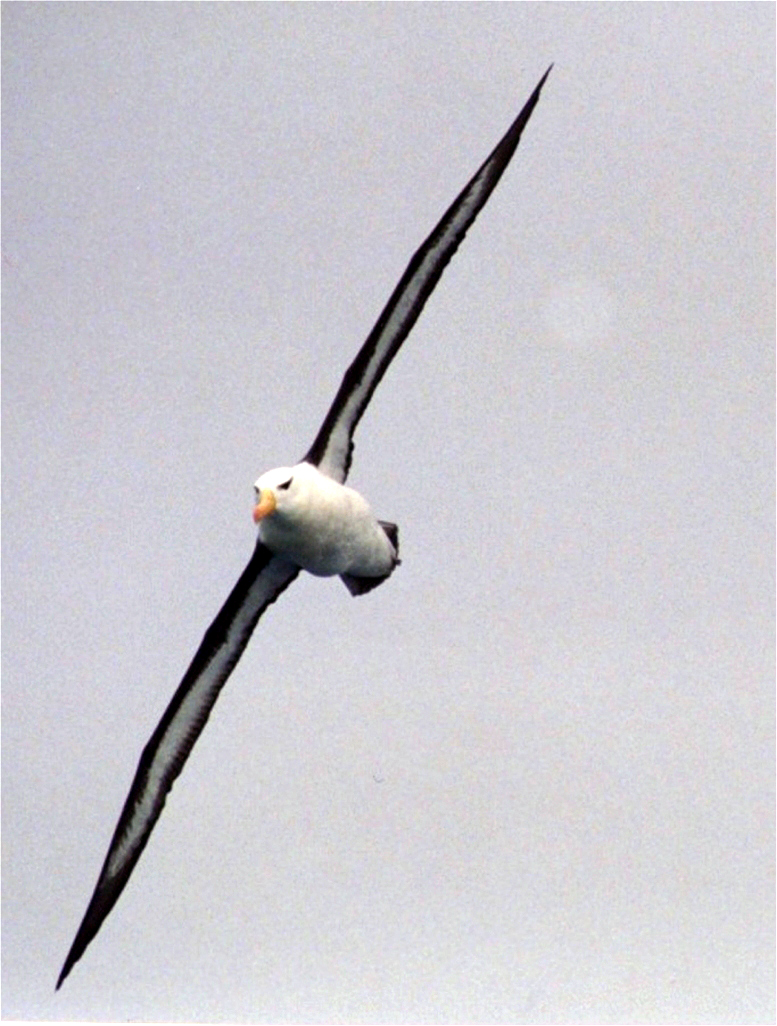
A black-browed albatross, through treaty subject to conservation measures by both Australia and New Zealand

Both have signed and ratified the ICCPR and its First Optional Protocol and Second Optional Protocol, the Convention Against Torture, the Convention on the Elimination of All Forms of Discrimination Against Women and its Optional Protocol, the First Hague Convention – with Australia additionally acceding to the Second Hague Convention, the UN Convention on the Rights of the Child, the Vienna Convention on Diplomatic Relations, the Geneva Conventions, the Antarctic Treaty System, the Outer Space Treaty, the Statelessness Reduction Convention, the Genocide Convention, the Nuclear Non-Proliferation Treaty, the Chemical Weapons Convention, the Biological Weapons Convention, the CTBT, the Treaty of Rarotonga, the Tobacco Control Treaty, UNCLOS, the Convention to Combat Desertification, the Berne Convention, the Universal Copyright Convention, the TRIPS Agreement, the Wassenaar Arrangement, the Convention on the Elimination of All Forms of Racial Discrimination – with Australia additionally accepting the competency of CERD to hear individual complaints, the Framework Convention on Climate Change and Kyoto Protocol, the Ottawa Treaty, the Agreement on the Conservation of Albatrosses and Petrels, the ENMOD Convention, the London Convention, the Ramsar Convention, the Paris Convention for the Protection of Industrial Property, the Patent Cooperation Treaty, the Single Convention on Narcotic Drugs, and the Convention on Psychotropic Substances. Both voted against the adoption of the Declaration on the Rights of Indigenous Peoples at the United Nations General Assembly, and both have declined to sign the Optional Protocol to the Convention on the Rights of Persons with Disabilities.

New Zealand has signed and ratified the Optional Protocol to the Convention against Torture and other Cruel, Inhuman or Degrading Treatment or Punishment; Australia has signed the optional protocol but has not ratified it. Australia, but not New Zealand, is a member of the Nuclear Energy Agency and UNIDROIT and a party to the Patent Law Treaty, the Budapest Treaty, the WIPO Copyright Treaty, the IPC Agreement, the Statelessness Status Convention and the Moon Treaty. Whereas Australia has signed and ratified the Convention for the Conservation of Antarctic Seals, New Zealand had not ratified it as of 2003.

From 1923 to 1968, both nations, along with the UK, exercised trusteeship of Nauru pursuant to the Nauru Island Agreement. In the period from 2001 to 2007, New Zealand accepted certain boat arrivals intending migrants to Australia for immigration processing as part of the Pacific Solution, otherwise focused upon the detention centre commissioned at Papua New Guinea's Manus Island. The two countries were the lead participants in the Regional Assistance Mission to Solomon Islands initiated in 2003.

In late May 2021, Ardern and Morrison issued a joint statement in Queenstown, New Zealand affirming bilateral cooperation on the issues of COVID-19, bilateral relations, and security issues in the Indo-Pacific. Morrison and Ardern also raised concerns about the South China Sea dispute and human rights in Hong Kong and Xinjiang. In response to the joint statement, Chinese Foreign Ministry spokesperson Wang Wenbin criticised Canberra and Wellington for allegedly interfering in Chinese domestic affairs.

In early December 2025, the New Zealand Finance Minister Nicola Willis and Climate Change Minister Simon Watts met with their Australian counterparts Jim Chalmers and Chris Bowen to discuss strengthening bilateral cooperation on climate action, clean energy and related regulations.

== Resident diplomatic missions ==
of Australia to New Zealand

- Wellington (High Commission)
- Auckland (Consulate-General)

of New Zealand in Australia

- Canberra (High Commission)
- Melbourne (Consulate-General)
- Sydney (Consulate-General)

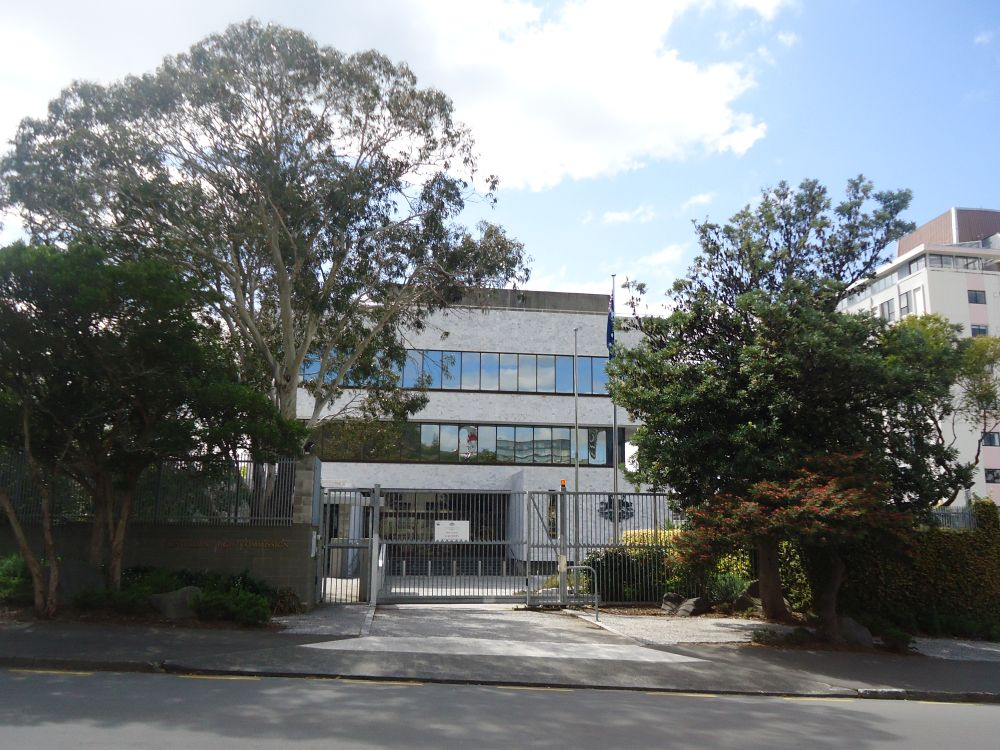
High Commission of Australia in Wellington

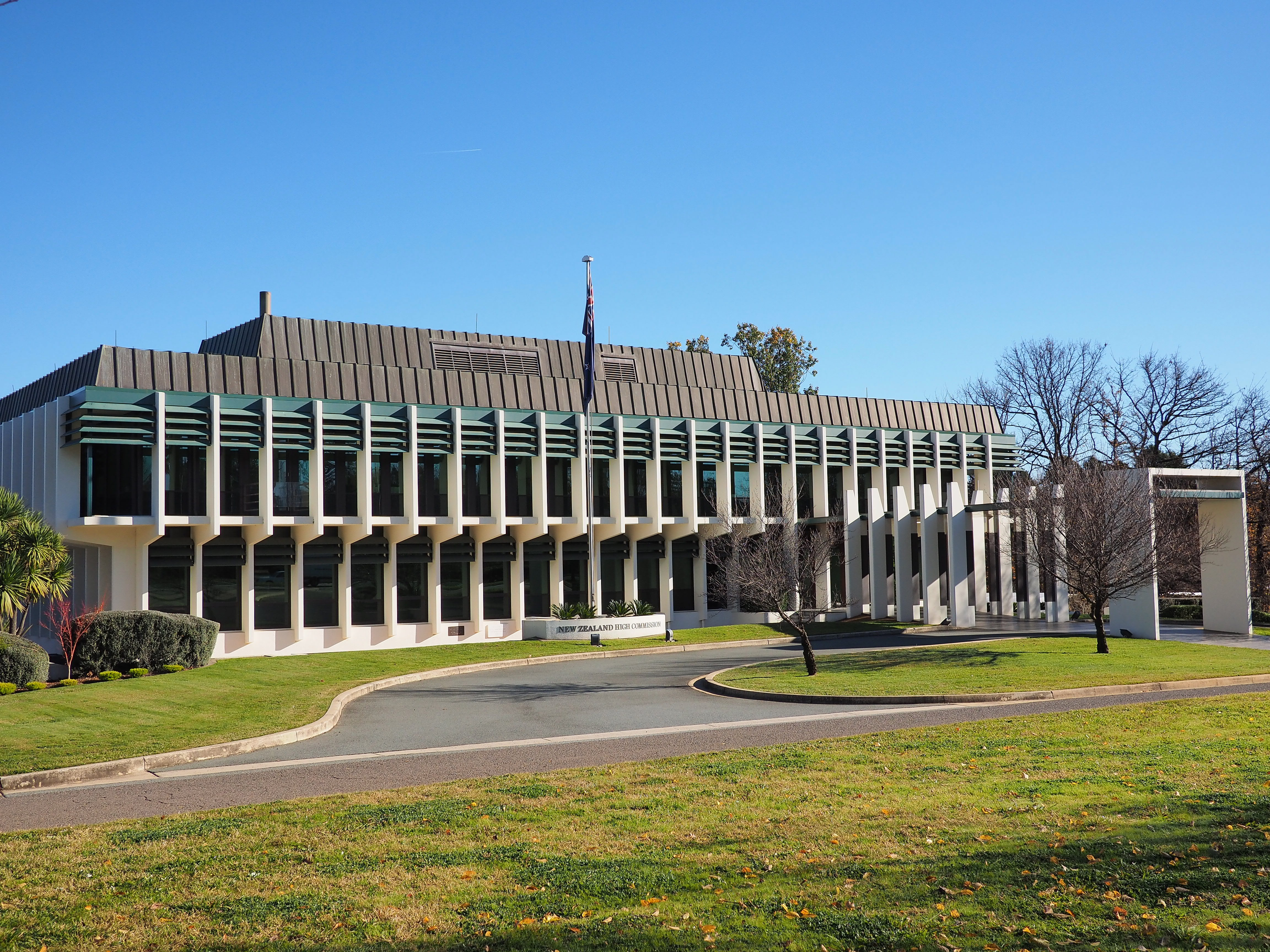
High Commission of New Zealand in Canberra

== Sport ==
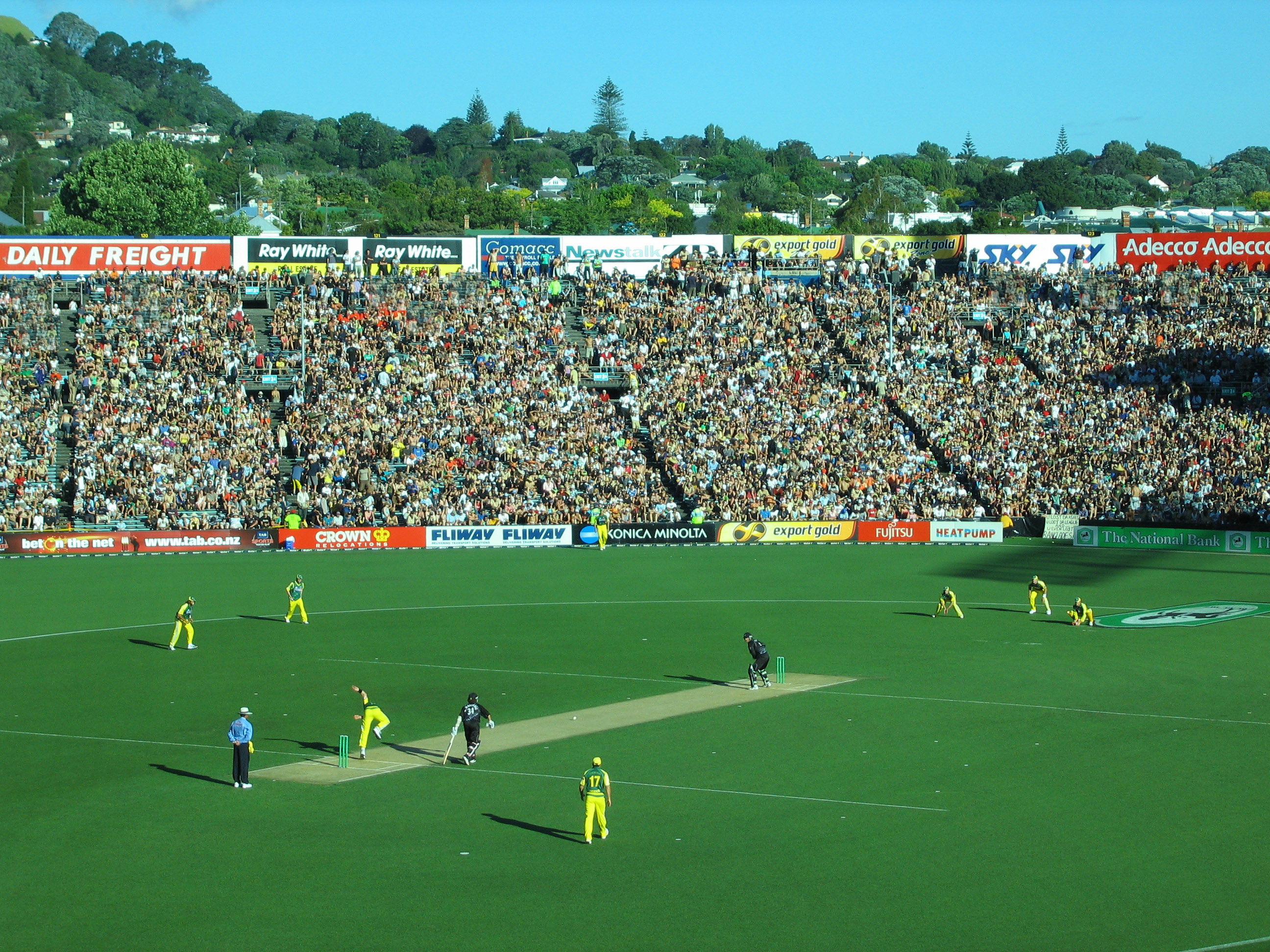
Chappell–Hadlee Series ODI cricket at Eden Park. New Zealand batting.

Cricket, rugby union, rugby league & netball are the preeminent sporting rivalries. Notably, respective national teams have competed in indoor bowls, basketball, football (soccer), field hockey, and touch football. Regular cross-Tasman competition occurs between domestic teams in men's rugby union, rugby league, football, and basketball, and also women's netball.

== Polls ==
A 2021 Lowy Institute poll ranked New Zealand as the most favourably viewed country by Australians, with an 87% favourability rating. New Zealand had also placed at number one in 2019, but was not included for the 2020 poll, in which Canada ranked first. In the Lowy Institute's 2022 poll, New Zealand again ranked as the most favourably viewed country by Australians, with a 86% rating, placing it ahead of Canada, the United Kingdom and Japan. In the same poll, another neighbouring Pacific Island state (Tonga), ranked as the sixth most positively viewed country with a 67% rating, placing it ahead of the United States, while the nearby countries of Indonesia and Papua New Guinea also garnered ratings of 57% and 61%. In the 2025 version of the poll (which didn't include Canada), New Zealand continued to rank as the most favorably viewed country by Australians, with an 85% favorability rating, placing it ahead of Japan at 76%, the United Kingdom at 75% and Singapore at 72%. A 2025 poll by the Asia New Zealand foundation ranked Australia as the most favorably viewed country by New Zealanders, with 72% viewing it as a "close friend" and 21% viewing it as a "friend", placing it ahead of the United Kingdom, Canada, Japan and Singapore.

A poll from travel company 1Cover suggested that 22% of New Zealanders had experienced displeasure at being mistaken for Australians when overseas, compared to only 4% of Australians who were mistaken for New Zealanders.

== Gallery ==
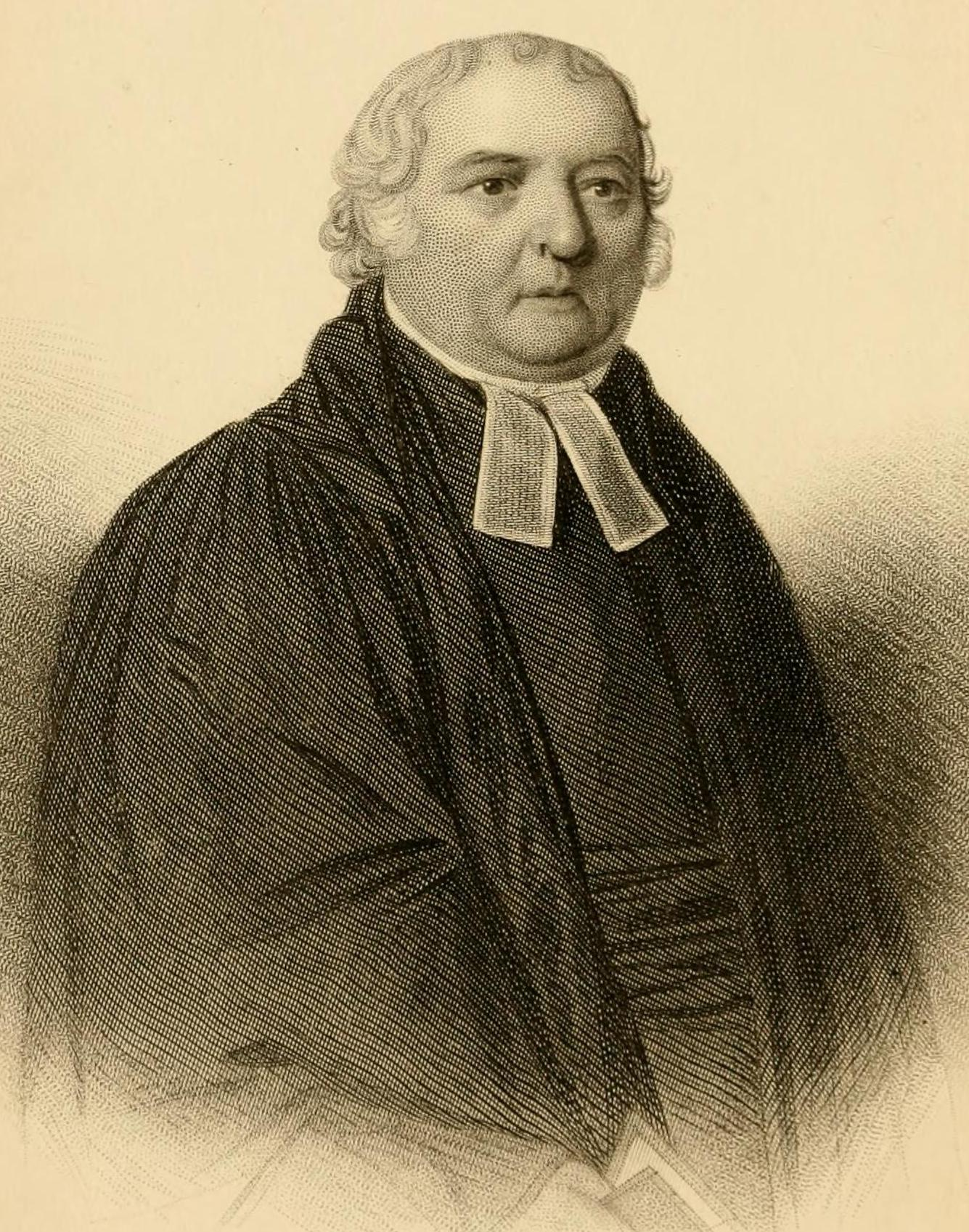
Rev. Samuel Marsden (1765–1838), Australian settler renowned for introducing Christianity to New Zealand

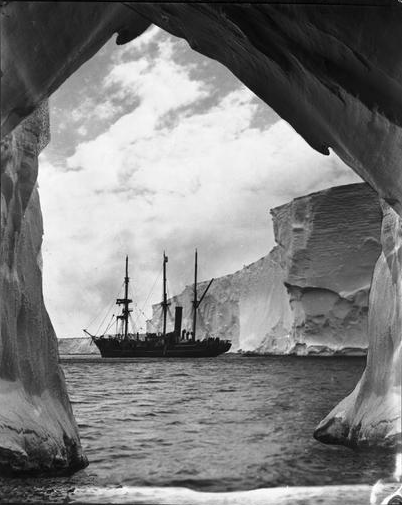
SY Aurora – ship of the Australasian Antarctic Expedition

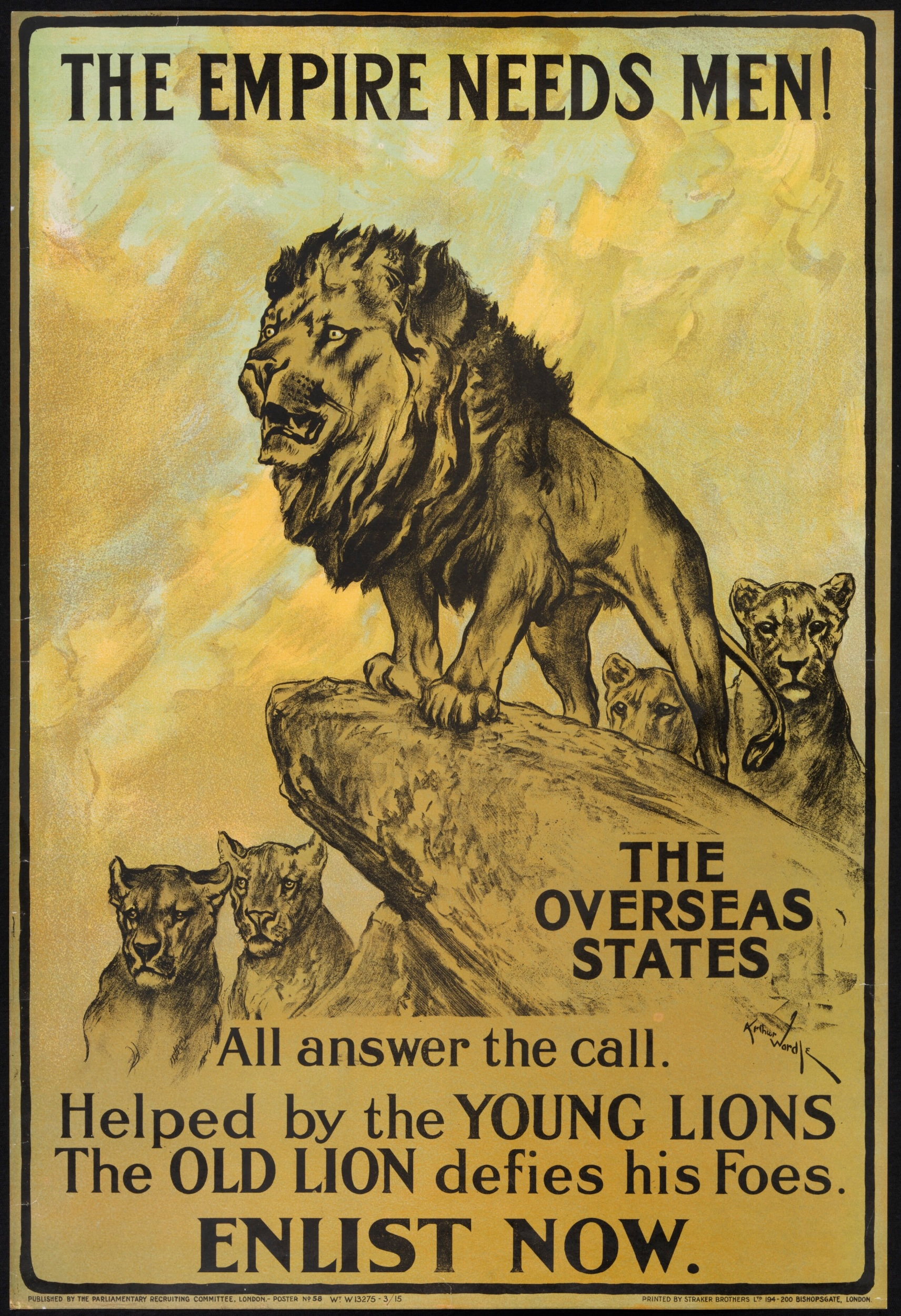
Recruitment poster urging men from the British Dominions to enlist in the Great War (1915)

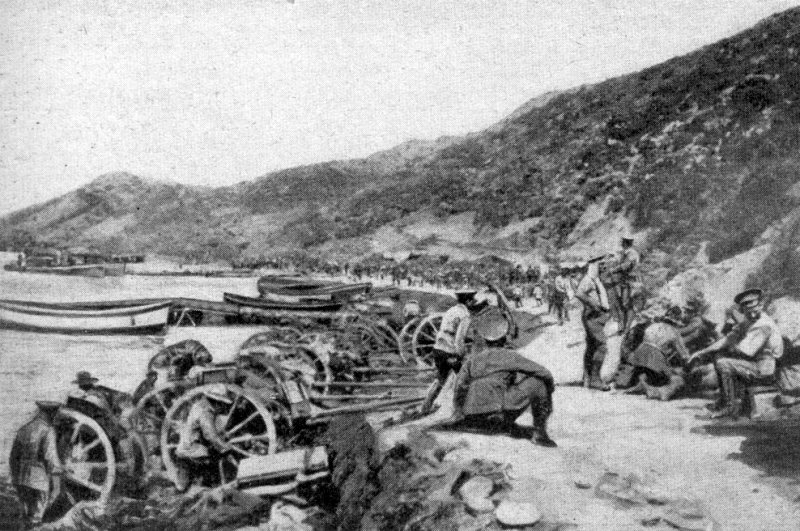
ANZAC at ANZAC Cove on 25 April 1915

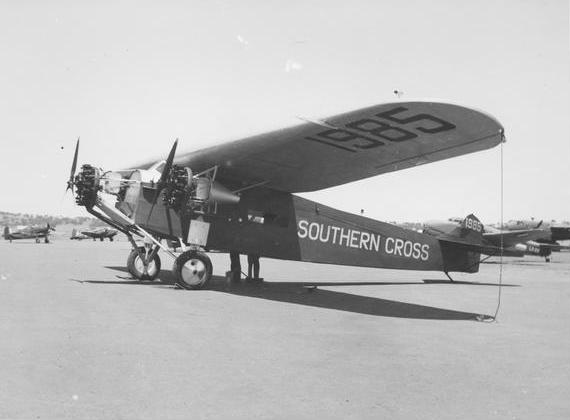
Southern Cross – first plane to accomplish aerial crossing of the Tasman

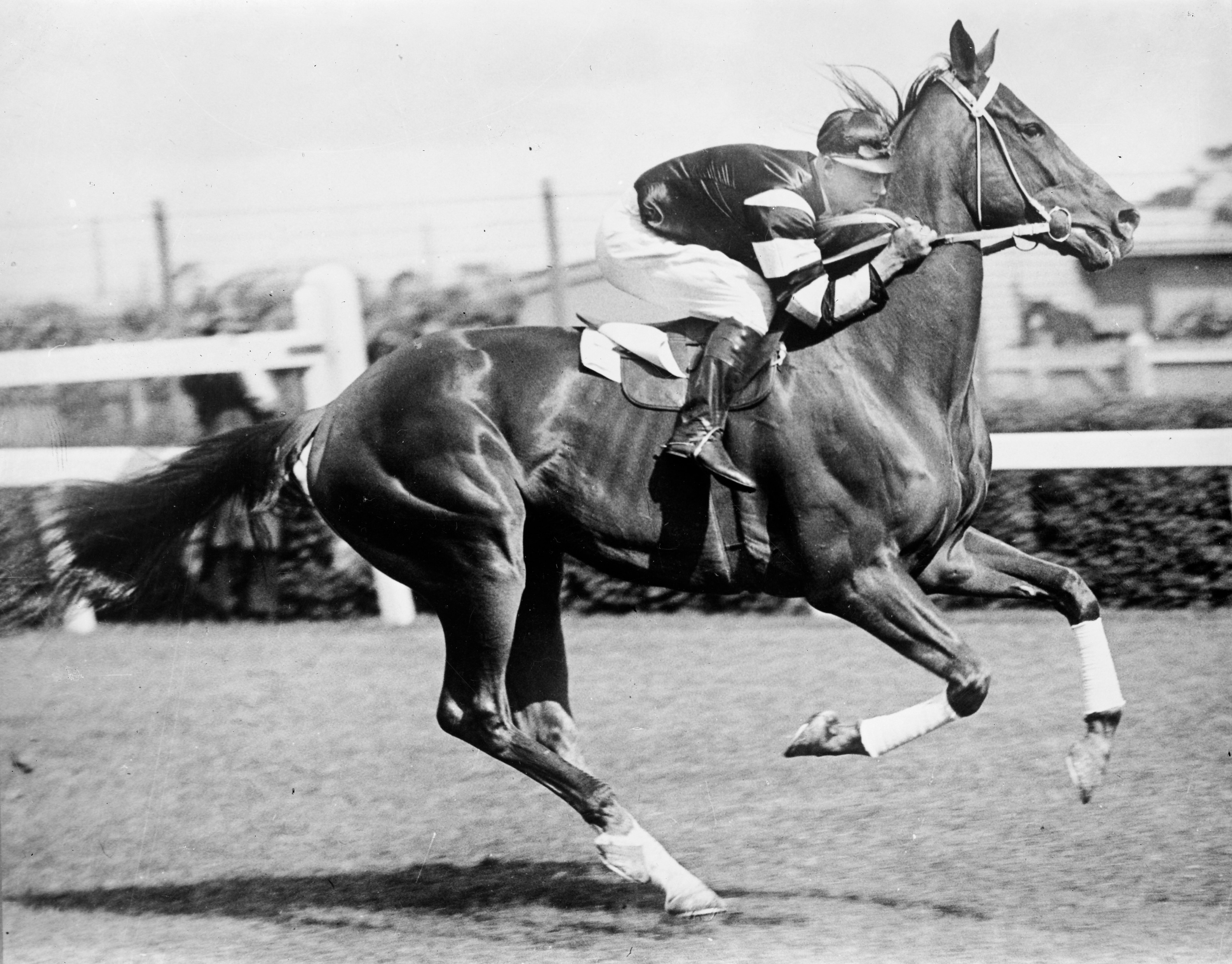
Phar Lap. New Zealand-born winner of the 1930 Melbourne Cup

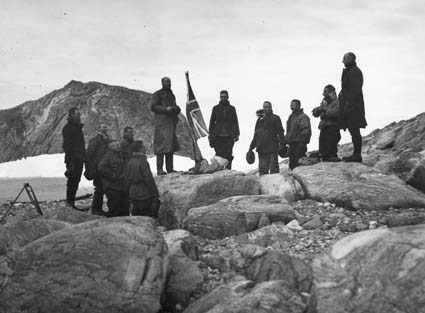
Douglas Mawson with members of BANZARE c.1930 claiming Mac Robertson Land for the Crown

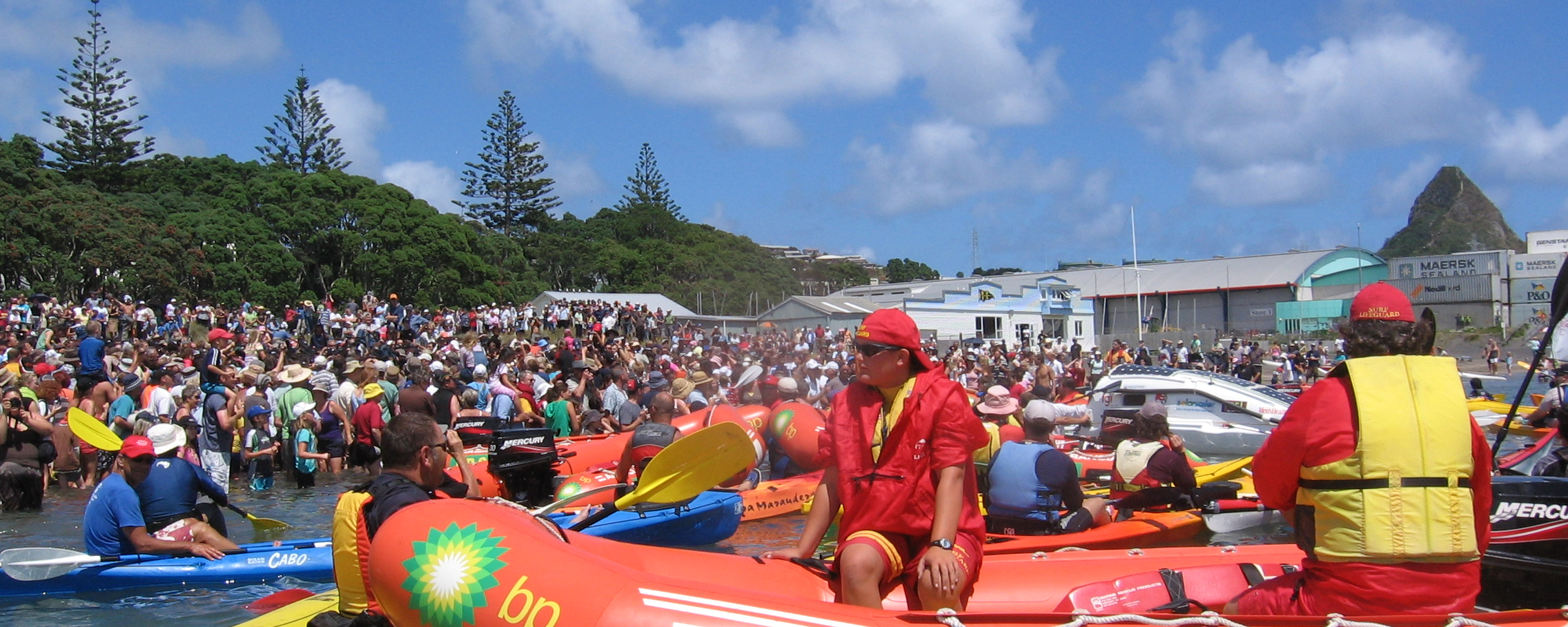
Culmination of the first successful kayak crossings of the Tasman at New Plymouth in 2007

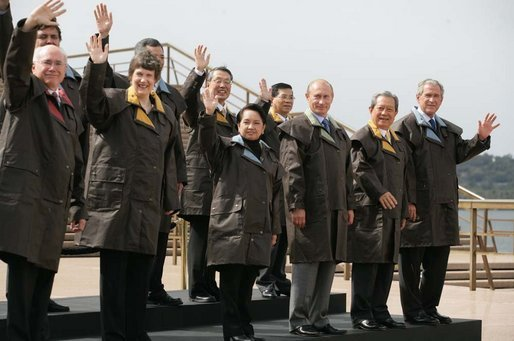
Prime Ministers of Australia and New Zealand seen at left among APEC leaders in 2007

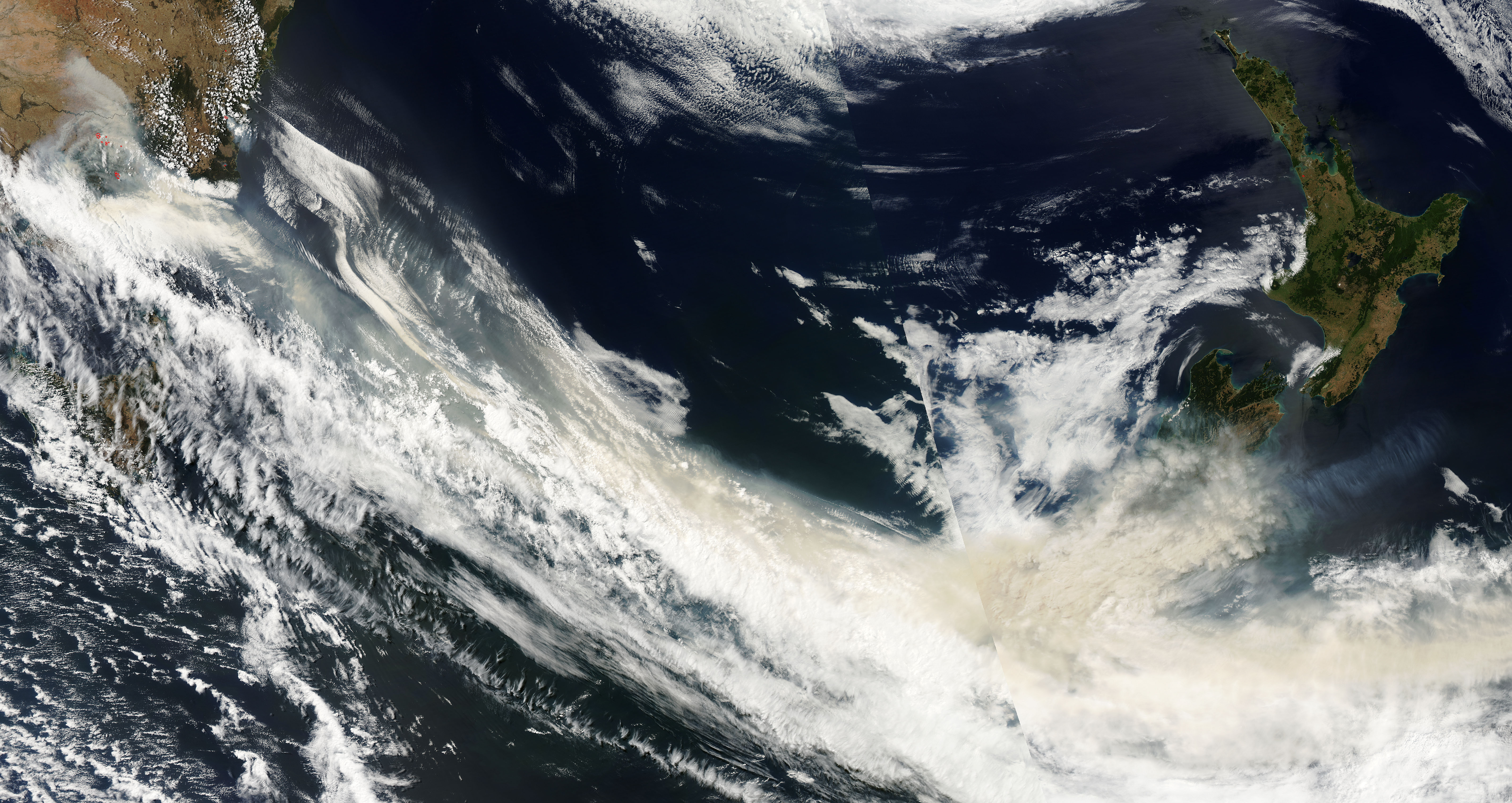
Smoke from the Black Saturday bushfires crosses the southern Tasman Sea in February 2009

== See also ==
- Australian New Zealanders
- New Zealand Australians
- Etiquette in Australia and New Zealand
- List of articles about Australia and New Zealand jointly
- List of islands of Australia and list of islands of New Zealand
