= Timeline of women's suffrage =

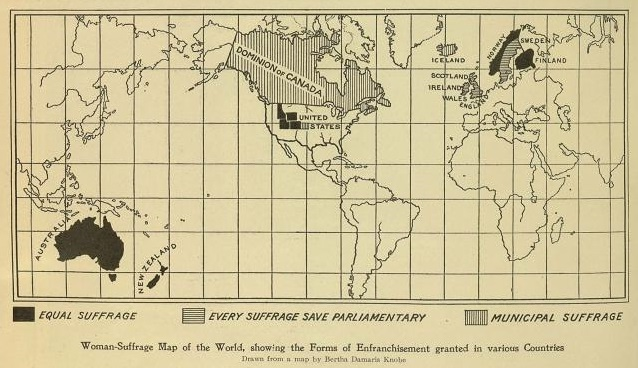
Women's suffrage in the world in 1913

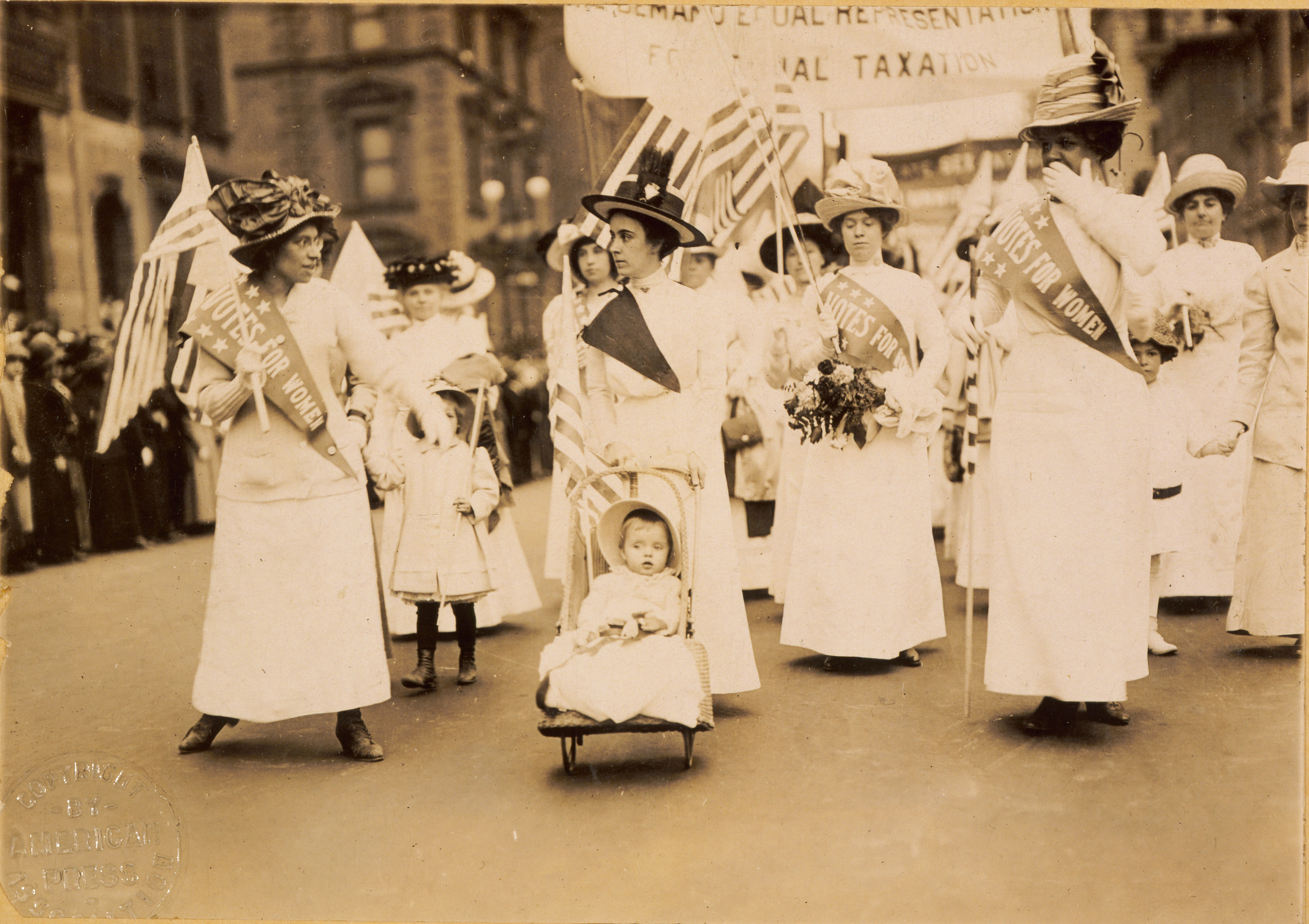
Suffrage parade, New York City, 6 May 1912

Women's suffrage – the right of women to vote – has been achieved at various times in countries throughout the world. In many nations, women's suffrage was granted before universal suffrage, in which cases women and men from certain socioeconomic classes or races were still unable to vote. Some countries granted suffrage to both sexes at the same time. This timeline lists years when women's suffrage was enacted. Some countries are listed more than once, as the right was extended to more women according to age, land ownership, etc. In many cases, the first voting took place in a subsequent year.

Certain women (based on property ownership) in the Isle of Man (geographically part of the British Isles but not part of the United Kingdom) gained the right to vote in 1881.

New Zealand was the first self-governing country in the world in which women had the right to vote in parliamentary elections, from 1893. However women could not stand for election to parliament until 1919, when three women stood (unsuccessfully); see 1919 in New Zealand.

The colony of South Australia allowed women to both vote and stand for election in 1895. In Sweden, conditional women's suffrage was granted during the Age of Liberty between 1718 and 1772. But it was not until the year 1919 that equality was achieved, where women's votes were valued the same as men's.

The Australian Commonwealth Franchise Act 1902 enabled female British subjects resident in Australia to vote at federal elections and also permitted them to stand for election to the Australian Parliament, making the newly federated country of Australia the first in the modern world to do so. However, the act excluded "natives of Australia, Asia, Africa and the Pacific Islands (other than New Zealand)". Two states either effectively or explicitly excluded indigenous Australians.

In 1906, the autonomous Grand Duchy of Finland, which later became the Republic of Finland, was the first country in the world to give all women and all men both the right to vote and the right to run for office. Finland was also the first country in Europe to give women the right to vote. The world's first female members of parliament were elected in Finland the following year.

In Europe, the last jurisdiction to grant women the right to vote was the Swiss canton of Appenzell Innerrhoden (AI), in 1991. Appenzell Innerrhoden is the smallest Swiss canton with around 14,100 inhabitants in 1990. Women in Switzerland obtained the right to vote at federal level in 1971, and at local cantonal level between 1959 and 1972, except for Appenzell in 1989/1990; see women's suffrage in Switzerland.

In Saudi Arabia, women were first allowed to vote in December 2015 in the municipal elections.

For other women's rights, see timeline of women's legal rights (other than voting).

== 17th century ==
1689

- Friesland: Female landowners are allowed to vote in elections to the States of Friesland in rural districts.

== 18th century ==
1718

- (yes) Sweden: Female taxpaying members of city guilds are allowed to vote in local city elections (rescinded in 1758) and national elections (rescinded in 1772).

1734

- (yes) Sweden: Female taxpaying property owners of legal majority are allowed to vote in local countryside elections (never rescinded).

1755

- Corsica: Female suffrage in the independent republic's Diet (assembly; rescinded upon annexation by France in 1769).

1776

- New Jersey (U.S. state): allowed unmarried and widowed women meeting property requirements to vote; later rescinded in 1807

== 19th century ==
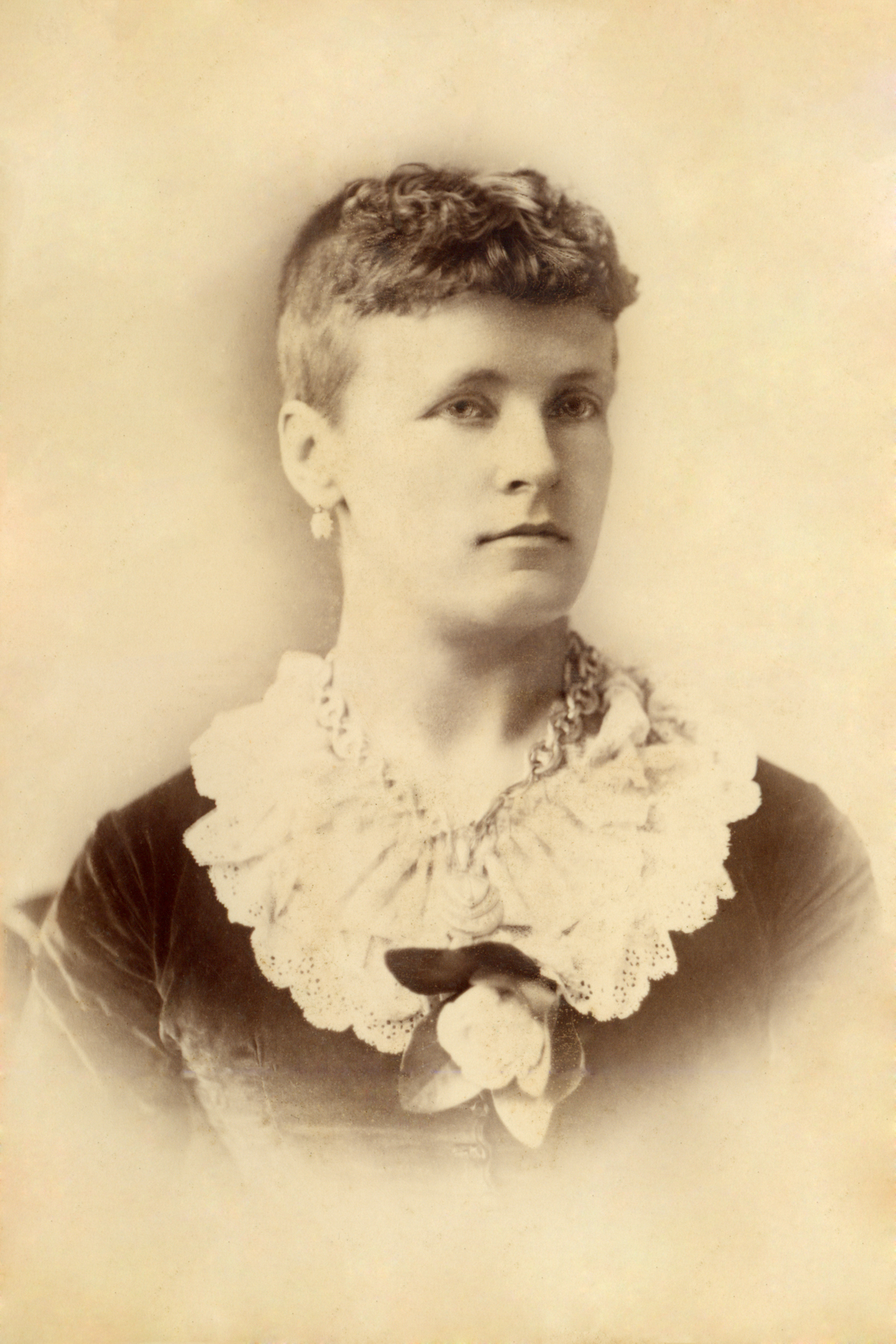
Portrait of an unknown New Zealand suffragette by Charles Hemus Studio Auckland, c. 1880—the sitter wears a white camellia and has cut off her hair, both symbolic of support for advancing women's rights

=== 1830s ===
1832

- United Kingdom: the Reform Act 1832 formally limits voting to men only.

1838

- Pitcairn Islands

=== 1840s ===
1840

- (Hawaii) Hawaiian Kingdom: later rescinded in 1852

1848

- Grand Duchy of Tuscany

=== 1850s ===
1853

- Republic of New Granada: The Province of Vélez, in what was then the Republic of New Granada (modern day Colombia), grants universal suffrage to men and women. The Supreme Court annulled the provision for women a few years later.

1856

- Norfolk Island: following population transfer from Pitcairn.

=== 1860s ===
1861

- South Australia – Australian colony of South Australia: property-owning women were given the right to vote.

1862

- Sweden: limited to local elections with votes graded after taxation; universal franchise achieved in 1919, which went into effect at the 1921 elections.
- Argentina: limited to local elections, only for literate women in San Juan Province.

1863

- The Grand Duchy of Finland (an autonomous state ruled by the Russian Empire) limited to taxpaying women in the countryside for municipal elections; and in 1872, extended to the cities.

1864

- Victoria – Australian colony of Victoria: women were unintentionally enfranchised by the Electoral Act (1863), and proceeded to vote in the following year's elections. The act was amended in 1865 to correct the error.
- Kingdom of Bohemia (now Czechia) – Austrian Empire: limited to taxpaying women and women in "learned professions" who were allowed to vote by proxy and made eligible for election to the legislative body in 1864.

1869

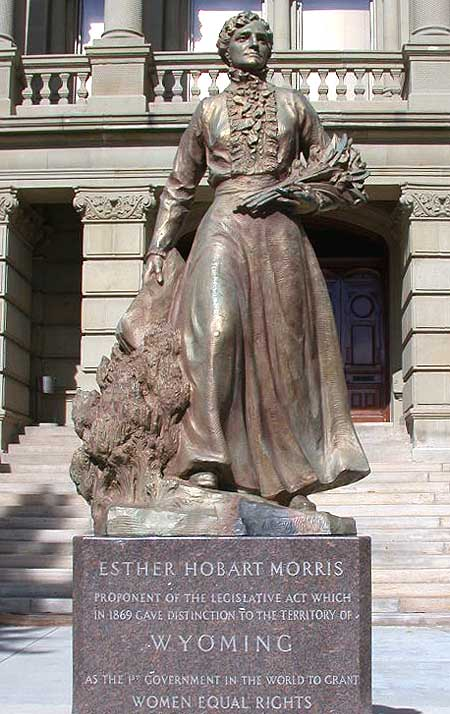
Statue of Esther Hobart Morris in front of the Wyoming State Capitol

- United Kingdom: single women ratepayers gain the right to vote in local elections under the Municipal Franchise Act 1869.
- United States – incorporated Territory of Wyoming: full suffrage for women.

=== 1870s ===
1870

- United States – Utah Territory: passed a law granting women's suffrage. Utah women citizens voted in municipal elections that spring and a general election on 1 August, beating Wyoming women to the polls. The women's suffrage law was later repealed as part of the Edmunds–Tucker Act in 1887.
- United States – 10 May 1872, New York City: Equal Rights Party nominates Victoria C. Woodhull as their candidate for US president.

=== 1880s ===
1881

- Kingdom of Croatia-Slavonia: Female taxpayers allowed to vote in local elections (rescinded in 1895).
- Isle of Man (self-governing British Crown dependency, with its own parliament and legal system): (limited at first to women "freeholders" and then, a few years later, extended to include women "householders"). Universal suffrage / the franchise for all resident men and women was introduced in 1919. All men and women (with a very few exceptions such as clergy) could also stand for election from 1919.
- Empire of Brazil: The Electoral Reform of 1881 maintained the income qualification for voting for those over 21, restricted the vote to the literate, abolished the exclusive right of Catholics to vote and stand for office, and instituted direct voting and voter registration. However, it omitted the restriction of the vote to the male gender.

1884

- Ontario – Canadian province: limited to widows and spinsters to vote in municipal elections; later extended to other provinces.

1887

- United States – Kansas: Women can vote in city elections and hold certain offices.
- Empire of Brazil: Isabel de Mattos Dillon, a dentist, became the first Brazilian woman to vote after exploiting a loophole in the Electoral Reform Law of 1881, which granted the right to vote to anyone holding an academic degree without specifying gender.

1888

- United States: Proposed Constitutional Amendment to extend suffrage and the right to hold office to women (limited to spinsters and widows who owned property).

1889

- The municipality of Franceville in the New Hebrides (universal suffrage within its short existence. Loses self-rule within months)

=== 1890s ===
1893

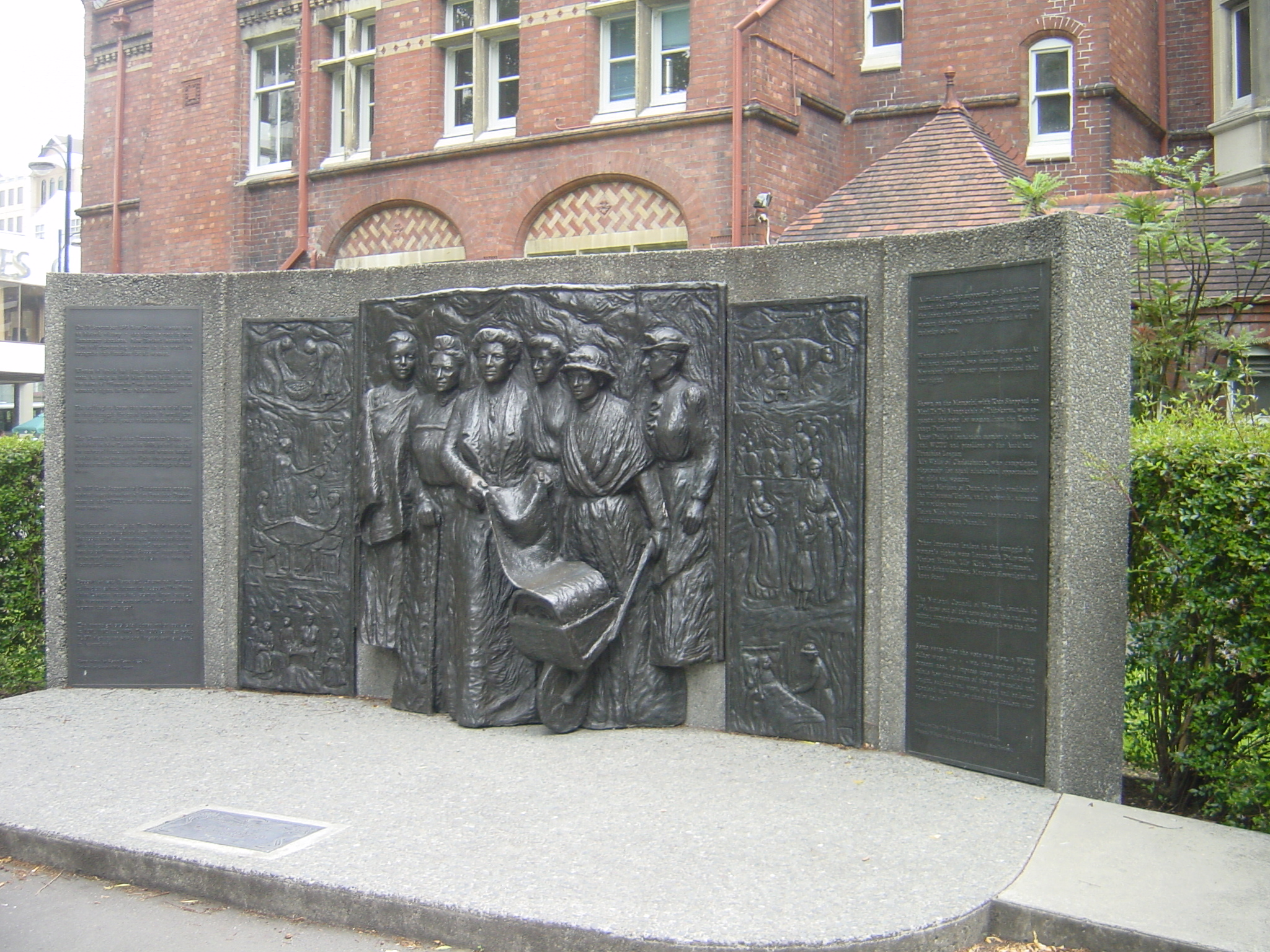
Kate Sheppard National Memorial, Christchurch, New Zealand

- New Zealand: first self-governing colony in the world in which women who were British subjects aged over 21 (and excluding Chinese women) are given the right to vote in parliamentary elections. However, women were barred from standing for parliament until 1919.
- Cook Islands (British protectorate) universal suffrage.
- Colorado (U.S. state): first state in the union to enfranchise women by popular vote.

1895

- South Australia: universal suffrage, extending the franchise from property-owning women (granted in 1861) to all women, the first colony in Australia to do so. Women were also granted the right to stand for election. (Note: South Australia celebrated the centenary of the female franchise in 1994; that is, 100 years from the date the legislation was passed by parliament rather that from the date it gained royal assent.)
- United Kingdom: Local Government Act 1894 confirms single women's right to vote in local elections and extends this franchise to some married women. By 1900, over 1 million women were registered for local government elections in England.

1896

- Utah (U.S. state): reestablishes women's suffrage upon gaining statehood.
- Idaho (U.S. state)

1897

- Siam: Formal provisions for female suffrage in village elections in Thailand date to the Local Administration Act of 1897. This makes Thailand the first major country in the world in which women and men achieved the vote on an equal basis simultaneously.

1898

- Denmark: Danske Kvindeforeningers Valgretsforbund (Danish Women's Society's Suffrage Union) founded in Copenhagen

1899

- Western Australia: West Australian women gained the vote but there was a property qualification for "Aboriginal natives of Australia, Asia or Africa" and people of mixed descent. The property qualification (ownership of land that was valued at least £100) excluded virtually all such persons from the franchise.

== 20th century ==
=== 1900s ===
1901

- South Australia (Australian state): Women were allowed to vote in Australia's first federal election
- Western Australia (Australian state): Women were allowed to vote in Australia's first federal election, but there were racial restrictions.

1902

- Australia: The Commonwealth Franchise Act 1902 gave all adult British subjects resident in Australia, including women, the right to vote at the federal level. However, the act excluded "natives of Australia, Asia, Africa and the Pacific Islands (other than New Zealand)". The 1903 Australian federal election was the first under the new legislation.
- New South Wales (Australian state)

1903

- Tasmania (Australian state)

1905

- Latvia, Russian Empire
- Queensland (Australian state): excluded "Aboriginal natives of Australia, India, China or the South Sea Islands."

1906

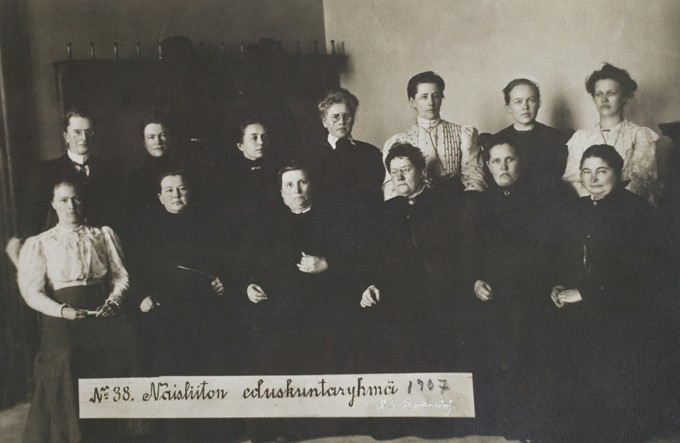
The first female MPs in the world were elected in Finland in 1907.

- Grand Duchy of Finland (an autonomous state ruled by the Russian Empire) (first in Europe to give women the right to vote and stand for parliament as a result of 1905 Russian Revolution). The world's first female members of parliament were elected in Finland the following year.
- New Hebrides: Perhaps inspired by the Franceville experiment, the Anglo-French Condominium of the New Hebrides grants women the right to vote in municipal elections and to serve on elected municipal councils. (Limited to British, French, and other colonists, and excluding indigenous women.)

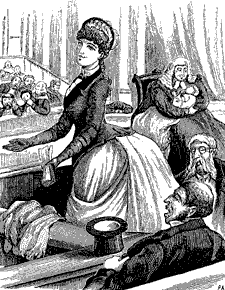
The argument over women's rights in Victoria was lampooned in this Melbourne Punch cartoon of 1887.

1908

- Denmark (limited to local elections)
- Victoria (Australian state): last Australian state to enact equal voting rights for women in state elections.

=== 1910s ===
1910

- Washington (U.S. state)

1911

- California (U.S. state)
- Argentina: Julieta Lanteri, doctor and leading feminist activist, votes in the election for the Buenos Aires City Legislature. She had realized that the government did not make specifications regarding gender, and appealed to justice successfully, becoming the first South American woman to vote.
- Portugal: Carolina Beatriz Ângelo becomes the first Portuguese woman to vote due to a legal technicality; the law is shortly thereafter altered to specify only literate male citizens over the age of 21 had the right to vote.
- Guangdong (Chinese Province): Women's right to vote and stand was granted by the provincial military government after 1911 Chinese Revolution, enabling ten women to enter the provincial assembly. However, with the following standardization bill by the national parliament in Sept 1912, women's suffrage in Guangdong was deprived.

1912

- Oregon (U.S. state)
- Kansas (U.S. state)
- Arizona (U.S. state)

1913

- Alaska (U.S. territory)
- Illinois (U.S. state) Women were granted an equal vote for all statutory offices, but no constitutional ones, which would have required amending the state constitution. Statutory offices included presidential electors, and 876,700 women voted for the top five candidates in 1916.
- Norway

1914

- Montana (U.S. state) Two years later, Montana's Jeannette Rankin is the first woman elected to a national legislature in an English-speaking country.
- Nevada (U.S. state)

1915

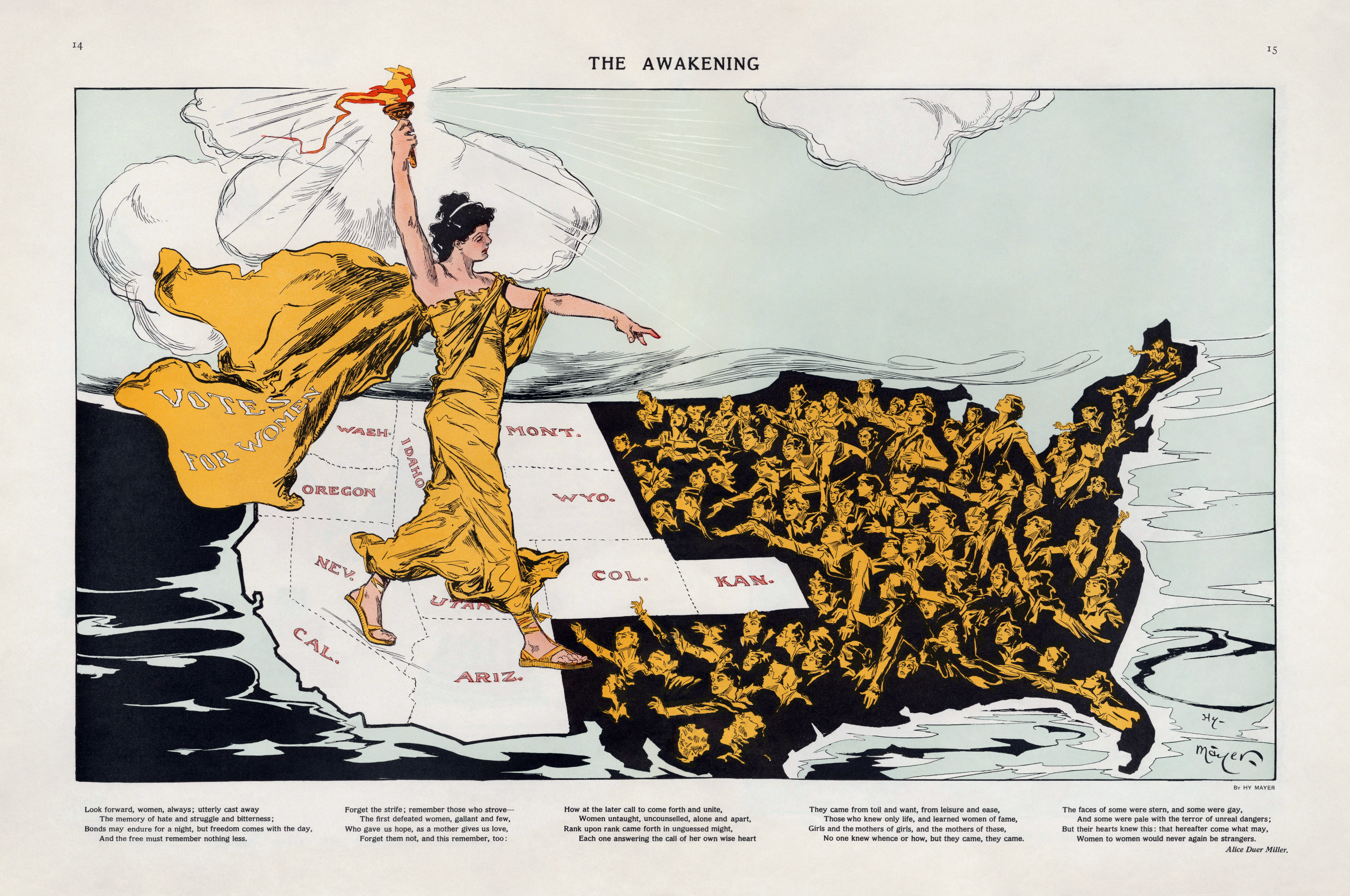
This map appeared in the magazine Puck during the Empire State Campaign, a hard-fought referendum on a suffrage amendment to the New York State constitution—the referendum failed in 1915.

- Denmark (including Iceland) (full voting rights)

1916

- Manitoba (Canadian province)
- Saskatchewan (Canadian province)
- Alberta (Canadian province) (elected first female lawmakers in British Empire, in 1917)

==== 1917 ====
- New York (U.S. State)
- Belarus
- Estonia
- Latvia (as an independent country)
- Lithuania
- British Columbia (Canadian province)
- Ontario (Canadian province)
- Canada (limited to war widows, women serving overseas, and women with family serving overseas)
- Russia
- Ukraine
- United Republics of the North Caucasus
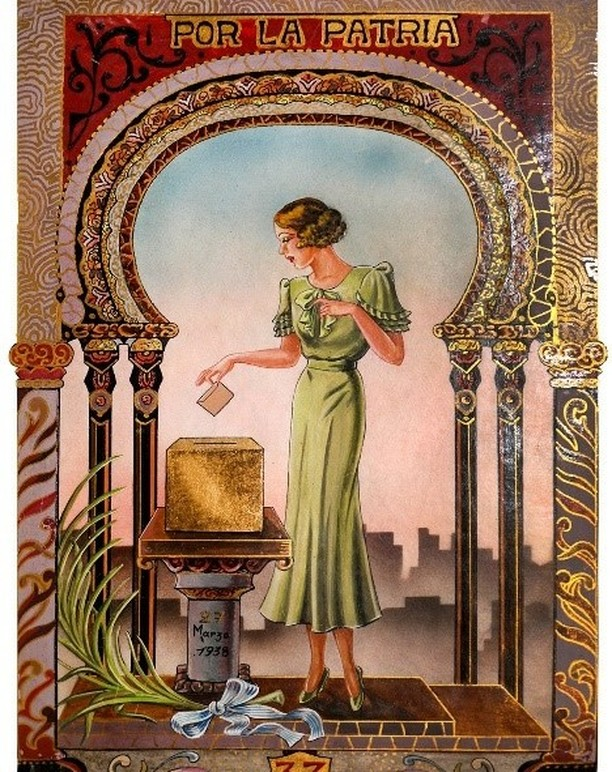
- Commemorative poster of women's suffrage in Uruguay.
  Uruguay (per Constitution)
- Crimean People's Republic
- Netherlands (ability to stand for elections)

==== 1918 ====
- Banat, Bačka and Baranja: Women over 20 were allowed to vote on the elections for the Great National Assembly. Seven female delegates were elected. Rescinded after incorporation into Kingdom of Serbs, Croats and Slovenes in 1922.
- Georgia (Full voting rights, The world's first democratically elected Muslim woman was from Georgia)
- Michigan (U.S. state)
- South Dakota (U.S. state)
- Oklahoma (U.S. state)
- Austria
- Azerbaijan (The first predominantly Muslim country in the world to give equal rights to men and women.)
- Canada (limited to women over 21, "not alien-born", and meeting provincially determined property qualifications)
- Denmark: First four women elected to the Folketing.
- Nova Scotia (Canadian province)
- Germany: On 12 November 1918, the new German government issued a declaration supporting universal suffrage. Shortly thereafter, the Electoral Act was passed on 30 November 1918, granting voting rights to all German citizens aged 20 and above, including women.
- Hungary: Limited to women over the age of 24 who were literate. (full suffrage granted in 1945)
- Poland (just after regaining independence)
- Russian SFSR
- Turkestan ASSR
- Trinidad and Tobago (British Crown Colony) (limited to women over 30; conditional on ownership of property and qualifications of their husbands. Women over 21 given the franchise in 1928)
- United Kingdom (limited to women over 30, compared to 21 for men and 19 for those who had fought in World War One; various property qualifications remained; see Representation of the People Act 1918.)
- Sweden: The Riksdag introduces equal voting rights in city council and municipal elections.

==== 1919 ====
- Afghanistan (rescinded in 1929)
- Armenia
- Belgium (limited to voting at municipal level)
- Georgia
- Hungarian Soviet Republic: universal suffrage to trade union members only.
- Isle of Man: all adults could vote or be elected, widows and single women who owned property could vote from 1881.
- Jamaica (British Crown Colony): Limited suffrage granted to women of twenty-five years or more, who earned £50 or more per year, or paid taxes of £2. (Universal adult suffrage not granted until 1944.)
- Czechoslovakia (voting at local/municipal level)
- Luxembourg
- Netherlands (women gain the right to vote in an election, having been given the right to stand in elections in 1917)
- New Zealand (women gain the right to stand for election into parliament; right to vote for Members of Parliament since 1893)
- New Brunswick (Canadian province) (limited to voting. Women's right to stand for office protected in 1934)
- Minnesota (U.S. state)
- Southern Rhodesia (now Zimbabwe, British Crown Colony, women now allowed to vote and stand for election into parliament)
- South West Caucasian Republic
- Sweden: The Riksdag takes the first out of two constitutional decisions for equal voting rights in elections to the Riksdag

=== 1920s ===
1920

- Albania
- Czechoslovakia (the newly adopted constitution guarantees universal suffrage for men and women and the first vote to the National Assembly is held; politically, the women's suffrage is guaranteed already in the Declaration of Independence from 1918, and women vote in local elections in 1919)
- Travancore Kingdom, Princely Indian State in the British Empire: It was the first place in India to grant women's suffrage, but did not grant the right to stand in elections.
- Jhalawar State: 2nd of the princely states in India to grant women enfranchisement.
- United States (all remaining states by amendment to federal Constitution). While sex was no longer the basis for disfranchisement, there were other grounds, most notably race, by which women's ability to vote was restricted. As part of Jim Crow, Black people in the South — both women and men — were largely disfranchised by unequal literacy tests and poll taxes until the Voting Rights Act of 1965. Many Native Americans within US jurisdiction were not US citizens until 1924, and faced similar disfranchisement attempts as Black Americans until the 1965 Act.

1921

- Azerbaijan SSR (Soviet Union)
- British India, Madras Presidency was the first of the provinces in the British India to grant women's suffrage, though there were income and property restrictions and women were not allowed to stand for office.
- British India, Bombay Presidency became the second province in British India to grant the right for women to vote with income and property restrictions and an inability to stand in elections.
- Costa Rica, El Salvador, Guatemala, and Honduras agreed to a federal constitution which included the provision that married or widowed literate women of 21 or more, or single literate women of 25 or more could vote or hold office as long as they met any property requirements. The constitution never took effect and was abandoned in January 1923.
- Sweden: The Riksdag takes the second and confirming decision to amend the Constitution such that equal voting rights are introduced in elections to the Riksdag.

1922

- British India, Burma Province became the third province of British India to grant limited suffrage, but not the right to stand in elections.
- Irish Free State (equal parliamentary (Oireachtas) suffrage to that of men upon independence from UK. Partial suffrage granted as part of UK in 1918.)
- Kingdom of Mysore became the 3rd of India's princely estates to grant women's suffrage.
- Prince Edward Island (Canadian province)
- Yucatán (Mexican state) (limited to regional and congressional elections)

1923

- British India, United Provinces of Agra and Oudh became the 4th province in British India to grant limited suffrage, though women could not stand for office.
- Rajkot State became the first princely state and first entity in British India to grant women both the right to vote and stand in elections.

1924

- British India, Assam Province became the 5th province in British India to grant suffrage with income and property restrictions, as well as the inability to stand for office.
- Ecuador (a doctor, Matilde Hidalgo de Prócel, sues and wins the right to vote)
- Kazakh ASSR (Soviet Union)
- Kingdom of Cochin: one of the princely states of British India granted both suffrage and the right for women to stand in elections.
- Mongolia (no electoral system in place prior to this year)
- Saint Lucia (British Crown Colony)
- Spain (limited to single women and widows in local elections. First women mayors)
- Tajik ASSR (Soviet Union)

1925

- British India, Bengal Presidency became the 6th province in British India to grant limited suffrage without the ability for women to stand in elections.
- Dominion of Newfoundland (limited to women 25 and older; men can vote at age 21. Equal suffrage granted in 1946. (Note: Although equal suffrage was granted in 1946, Newfoundland was ruled directly by an unelected Commission of Government. Newfoundlanders voted equally in the 1949 general election following Confederation.))
- Italy (limited to local elections)

1926

- British India, Punjab Province became the 7th province in British India to grant limited suffrage without the ability for women to stand in elections.
- British India was empowered by the British Parliament to amend the voting regulations and allow women to stand for office, if the province in which they resided granted women's suffrage.

1927

- British India, Central Provinces became the 8th province in British India to grant suffrage to women.
- Turkmen SSR (Soviet Union)
- Uruguay (women's suffrage is broadcast for the first time in 1927, in the referendum of Cerro Chato)
- Brazil: Rio Grande do Norte becomes the first Brazilian state to institute universal suffrage.

1928

- United Kingdom (franchise made equal to that for men by the Representation of the People Act 1928)
- Brazil: Celina Guimarães Viana becomes the first woman to vote during the republican period, in the state elections of Rio Grande do Norte.

1929

- British India, Bihar and Orissa Province became the last of the provinces in British India to grant women's limited suffrage with income and property restrictions.
- Ecuador (the right of women to vote is written into the Constitution)
- Puerto Rico (literate women given the right to vote. Equal suffrage granted in 1935.)
- Romania (limited to local elections only, with restrictions)

=== 1930s ===
1930

- South Africa (Women's Enfranchisement Act, 1930: limited to white women on the same basis as white men.)
- Turkey (limited to municipal elections).

1931

- Ceylon (Modern day Sri Lanka) (Universal Suffrage)
- Chile (limited to municipal level for female owners of real estate under Legislative Decree No. 320)
- Portugal (with unequal restrictions regarding level of education)
- Spain (universal suffrage, revoked in 1939 and reinstated in 1977)

1932

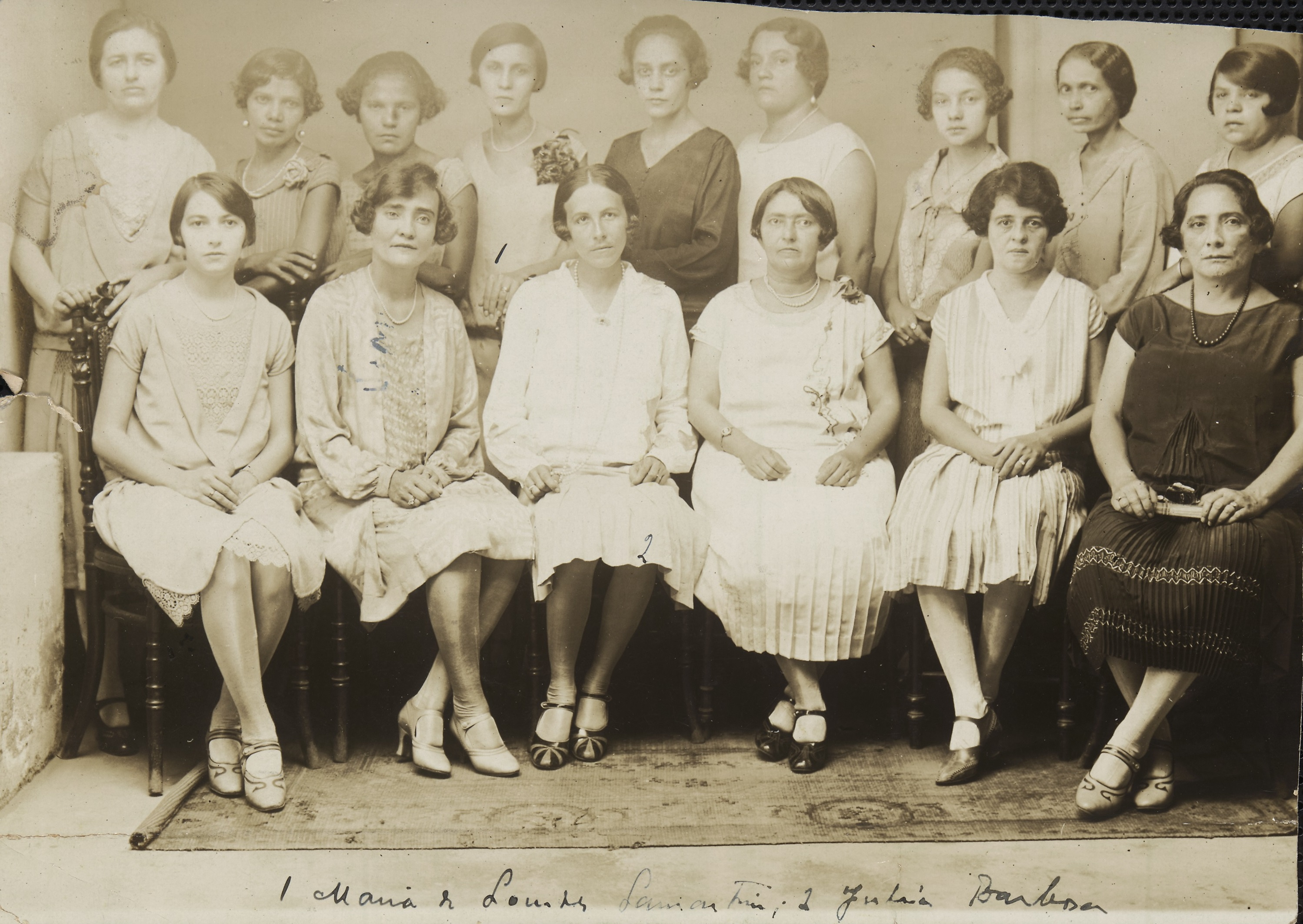
First women electors of Brazil.

- Brazil (universal suffrage)
- Maldives
- Siam (universal suffrage)

1934

- Chile (limited to municipal level under Law No. 5,357)
- Cuba
- Portugal (suffrage is expanded)
- Tabasco (Mexican state) (limited to regional and congress elections only)
- Turkey (parliamentary elections; full voting rights and rights to be elected for any public office including the National Parliament, which resulted in 18 female members of the parliament to stand for office from 18 different provinces in the 1935 National Parliament elections).

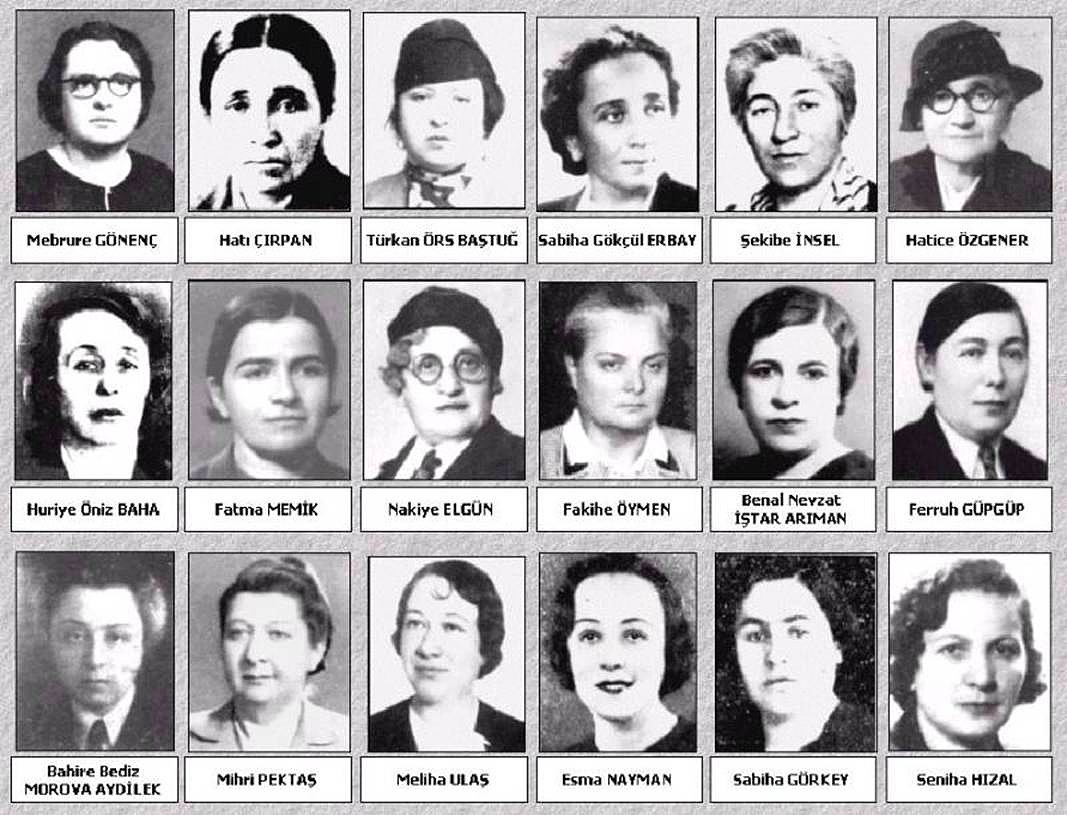
Eighteen female MPs joined the Grand National Assembly of Turkey in 1935.

1935

- British India
- British Burma (now Myanmar, women are granted the right to vote)
- Irish Free State (equal suffrage at local elections; partial suffrage as part of the UK from 1869, extended in 1918.)
- Philippines (Act No. 4112 – rescinded after the May 1935 plebiscite)

1937

- Bulgaria (limited to mothers with legitimate children voting in local elections)
- Dutch East Indies (for European women only)
- Philippines (ratified Commonwealth Act No. 34 and affirmed suffrage rights provision proposed in the 1935 Constitution through the a plebiscite)

1938

- Bolivia
- Uruguay (women vote for the first time in a national election, having already voted in a previous local election)
- Uzbek SSR (Soviet Union)
- Western Samoa (European women)

1939

- El Salvador (with restrictions requiring literacy and a higher age)
- Romania (women are granted suffrage on equal terms with men with restrictions on both men and women; in practice the restrictions affected women more than men)
- South West Africa (now Namibia, white women)

=== 1940s ===
1940

- Quebec (Canadian province)
- Moldavian SSR (Soviet Union) (as part of Romania, partial suffrage from 1929, extended in 1939)

1941

- Dutch East Indies (limited to European women only)
- Panama (with restrictions. Full suffrage granted in 1946.)

1942

- Dominican Republic

1944

- Bermuda (limited to property-holding women)
- Bulgaria (full rights)
- France

1945

- Dutch East Indies
- Guatemala (Literate only)
- Italy
- Japan
- Senegal (French Colony)
- French Togoland
- Yugoslavia
- Guyana (to stand)

1946

- French Cameroon
- French Somaliland
- Kenya
- North Korea
- Liberia (Americo women only; indigenous men and women were not enfranchised until 1951)
- Mandatory Palestine
- Portugal (expands suffrage)
- Romania (extended to full rights)
- Venezuela
- Vietnam
- Djibouti (to vote)

1947

- Argentina
- Republic of China (includes Taiwan: with restrictions)
- Malta
- Mexico (limited to municipal level)
- India (establishment of the state)
- Nepal
- Pakistan (establishment of the state)
- Singapore

1948

- United Nations adopted The Universal Declaration of Human Rights Article 21
- Belgium
- Israel (establishment of the state)
- South Korea (establishment of the state)
- Iraq
- Niger
- Dutch Surinam
- Netherlands Antilles
- Seychelles

1949

- Chile (right expanded to all elections on 8 January by Law No. 9,292)
- People's Republic of China (establishment of the state)
- Costa Rica
- Syria

=== 1950s ===
1950

- Barbados
- El Salvador (all restrictions removed)
- Haiti

1951

- Antigua and Barbuda
- Dominica
- Grenada
- Nepal
- Saint Christopher-Nevis-Anguilla
- Saint Vincent and the Grenadines
- Ghana

1952

- United Nations enacts Convention on the Political Rights of Women
- Bolivia
- Côte d'Ivoire (French Colony)
- Greece

1953

- Bhutan
- Guyana
- Mexico (all women and for national elections)
- Guyana (to vote)

1954

- British Honduras
- Gold Coast

1955

- Cambodia
- Ethiopia
- Eritrea (as part of Ethiopia)
- Indonesia
- Honduras
- Nicaragua
- Peru

1956

- Dahomey (a part of the present Benin) (French Colony)
- Comoros (French Colony)
- Egypt
- Gabon (French Colony)
- Mali (French Colony)
- British Somaliland
- Mauritius
- Somalia

1957

- Colombia (by constitution)
- Malaysia
- Southern Rhodesia (now Zimbabwe)
- Lebanon (nationwide)

1958

- Upper Volta (now Burkina Faso)
- Chad (French Colony)
- Guinea
- Laos
- Nigeria (South)

1959

- Brunei (British Commonwealth)
- Vaud (Swiss canton)
- Neuchâtel (Swiss canton)
- Madagascar
- San Marino
- Tanganyika
- Tunisia
- Cayman Islands

=== 1960s ===
1960

- Cyprus
- Gambia
- Geneva (Swiss canton)
- Tonga

1961

- Burundi
- Mauritania
- Malawi
- Paraguay
- Rwanda
- Sierra Leone

1962

- Algeria
- Australia (universal suffrage Australian Aboriginals men and women)
- Bahamas
- Brunei (British Commonwealth) (revoked) (including men)
- Monaco
- Uganda
- Northern Rhodesia (now Zambia)

1963

- Congo
- Equatorial Guinea
- Fiji
- Iran (after a referendum)
- Kenya
- Morocco

1964

- Afghanistan
- Libya
- Papua New Guinea (Territory of Papua and Territory of New Guinea)
- Sudan

1965

- Botswana
- Lesotho
- Guatemala (all restrictions removed)

1966

- Basel-Stadt (Swiss canton)

1967

- Democratic Republic of the Congo
- Ecuador (women's vote made obligatory, like that of men's)
- Kiribati
- Tuvalo
- South Yemen

1968

- Basel-Landschaft (Swiss canton)
- Bermuda (universal)
- Nauru
- Portugal (systemic limitations remained due to the general rule of being able to read)
- Swaziland

=== 1970s ===
1970

- Andorra
- North Yemen

1971

- Switzerland (federal level)

1972

- Bangladesh (suffrage enshrined in constitution adopted after independence) (For pre 1971 rights see British Raj 1935 and East/West Pakistan 1947.)

1973

- Bahrain (Bahrain did not hold elections until 2002)

1974

- Jordan
- Solomon Islands

1975

- Angola
- Cape Verde
- Mozambique
- São Tomé and Príncipe
- Vanuatu

1976

- Timor Timur (Indonesia)
- Portugal (general restriction to those able to read was lifted after the democratization by the Carnation Revolution)

1977

- Guinea-Bissau

1978

- Marshall Islands
- Federated States of Micronesia
- Nigeria (North)
- Palau

=== 1980s ===
1984

- Liechtenstein

1985

- Kuwait (first time)

1986

- Central African Republic
- Djibouti (to stand)

1989

- Namibia (universal suffrage)

=== 1990s ===
1991

- Appenzell Innerrhoden (Swiss canton) was forced to accept women's suffrage by the Federal Supreme Court of Switzerland
- Western Samoa (universal suffrage)

1996

- Afghanistan (revoked)

1997

- Eritrea

1999

- Qatar
- Kuwait (revoked)

== 21st century ==
=== 2000s ===
2001

- Afghanistan (re-granted after the fall of Taliban)

2003

- Oman

2005

- Kuwait

2006

- United Arab Emirates (UAE) (limited suffrage for both men and women)

=== 2010s ===
2015

- Saudi Arabia (introduced along with right to run for municipal elections)

=== 2020s ===
2021

- Afghanistan (restricting previous full right, allowing "temporarily" voting rights)

Note: In some countries, both men and women have limited suffrage. For example, in Brunei, which is a sultanate, there are no national elections, and voting exists only on local issues. In the United Arab Emirates the rulers of the seven emirates each select a proportion of voters for the Federal National Council (FNC) that together account for about 12% of Emirati citizens.

== See also ==
- Timeline of first women's suffrage in majority-Muslim countries
- Timeline of women's suffrage in the United States
- Timeline of women's legal rights (other than voting)
- List of the first female holders of political offices in Europe
- List of the first female members of parliament by country
- List of suffragists and suffragettes
- List of women's rights activists
- List of women pacifists and peace activists
- Women's suffrage organizations
