= King v Jones =

Judgement of the High Court of Australia

- Court: High Court of Australia
- Full case name: King v Jones; McEwen v Hackert; Jones v Jones
- Decided: 1 September 1972
- Citations: [1972] HCA 44, (1972) 128 CLR 221

Court membership
- Judges sitting: Barwick CJ, McTiernan, Menzies, Walsh, Gibbs & Stephen JJ

Case opinions
- (6:0) The words "adult person" in section 41 of the Australian Constitution are fixed with the same meaning they had when the Constitution came into effect, that is, they refer to persons over the age of 21.

King v Jones was an Australian court case decided in the High Court of Australia on 1 September 1972. It concerned section 41 of the Australian Constitution, and whether that section gave a person who had the right to vote in elections in South Australia the right to vote in elections at a federal level. The main issue in the case was the meaning of the words "adult person" in section 41. The court decided that those words only applied to people who had attained the age of 21. A more significant issue, whether section 41 is a guarantee or a transitional provision, was considered briefly in this case.

== Background to the case ==
Before 1970, the legal voting age was 21 across Australia, at both the federal level and in all of the states and territories of Australia. In that year however, the state of Western Australia lowered the voting age to 18, and New South Wales passed a law to lower the age, although it had not yet taken effect at the time of this case. South Australia lowered the age in 1971. At the federal level, the Liberal government under Billy McMahon was opposed to lowering the voting age and resisted calls to follow the states in lowering the age.

In 1972, Susan King, the 18-year-old daughter of the Attorney-General of South Australia, attempted to enroll to vote at her local electoral office in the Division of Boothby. King was eligible to enroll to vote in South Australian elections, since she was over the voting age of 18, as required by the Age of Majority (Reduction) Act 1970. However, the electoral registrar there, Ernest Jones, did not enroll her because she was not over the age of 21, the minimum voting age under the Commonwealth Electoral Act 1918. Another provision of that act allowed people who were refused enrolment to apply to a court to get an order to have their name put on the register, and King did so, applying to the Magistrates' Court of South Australia.

However, before her application could be heard, the Attorney-General of Australia, Senator Ivor Greenwood, used his powers under the Judiciary Act 1903 to order that the case be removed into the High Court of Australia. Two other people, Gerard McEwen and David Jones, had made similar applications after they were prevented from enrolling. Because the cases were similar, the three actions were heard together in the High Court. The Government of South Australia also decided to intervene in the case.

King was represented in the case by Lionel Murphy, a Labor Senator, and the leader of the opposition in the Australian Senate. Jones was represented by the Solicitor-General of Australia.

== Arguments ==
King's main argument was based on section 41 of the Australian Constitution. That section provides that:

41. No adult person who has or acquires a right to vote at elections for the more numerous House of the Parliament of a State shall, while the right continues, be prevented by any law of the Commonwealth from voting at elections for either House of the Parliament of the Commonwealth.

The argument was that, because King was an adult person who had a right to vote in elections for the South Australian House of Assembly (the more numerous house of the Parliament of South Australia), she therefore could not be prevented from enrolling or voting in federal elections by the Commonwealth Electoral Act 1918.

=== "Adult person" ===
However, the main argument for the respondent Jones was that King was not an "adult person" within the meaning of section 41, since adult meant a person who had reached the age of 21. It was argued that, when the Constitution of Australia came into being, the word "adult" would have been clearly understood as meaning a person over 21, and was used in contrast with the word "infant", which meant anyone under 21.

But it was argued for King that the South Australian Age of Majority (Reduction) Act 1970 had altered the age at which people in South Australia are legally considered adults from 21 to 18. Lionel Murphy also suggested that "adult person" really meant a person considered to be mature, and that in 1972, a person over 18 years old was considered mature, at least in South Australia. Murphy also raised the examples that people over 18 can, by law, marry, be tried as adults under Australian criminal law, and can serve in the Australian Defence Force. Murphy cited a range of dictionaries, including legal dictionaries, which gave the definition of adult as a person who is considered mature.

South Australia had intervened in the case, and the Solicitor-General for South Australia made the argument that section 41 of the Australian Constitution allows for differences between the states as to who has suffrage. He argued that the section used the words "adult person" not as a technical legal word (because the technical words are words such as "majority" or "full age") but rather simply to refer to the common meaning of who is an adult. Thus section 41 entitled King to vote, because the meaning of "adult person" in South Australia was a person over 18.

Murphy attempted to call evidence from a professor of sociology to support the claim that persons over 18 were considered mature persons in Australia. However, Chief Justice Barwick said that the court would only consider that evidence if they found that the meaning of "adult person" in section 41 was uncertain.

=== Nature of section 41 ===
An alternative argument raised for the respondent Jones was that section 41 was only ever intended to be a transitional provision, to have effect only until the Parliament of Australia made laws about who could vote in federal elections. On this view, the section could be read as referring only to adult persons who were alive when the Constitution came into effect, or referring only to state laws in force when the Constitution came into effect, under which people might acquire a right to vote. This argument was first raised by John Quick and Robert Garran in their 1901 book, The Annotated Constitution of the Australian Commonwealth.

Jones argued that this interpretation should be adopted because of section 30 of the Constitution. That section provides that "Until the Parliament otherwise provides", the eligibility of people to vote at a federal level would be determined by state laws. The argument was that similarly, section 41 was a transitional provision designed to preserve the status quo until the parliament made laws about the subject (the first such law being the Commonwealth Franchise Act 1902).

== Judgment ==
In a unanimous decision, the court held that the words "adult person" in section 41 were fixed with the meaning they had when the Constitution came into effect, and thus applied only to people aged over 21. Justice Stephen summed up the court's opinion:

"The ordinary legal meaning of "adult"... was, at Federation, and had for centuries been, that of a person who had ceased to be an infant and had attained full age by attaining the age of twenty-one years."

Because the court decided that King was not an "adult person", and that section 41 did not apply to her, the court did not need to decide about the nature of section 41, whether it was a guarantee or a transitional provision. However, some of the judges did address the issue in obiter dicta. Justice Menzies said:

"The character of s. 41 is that of a permanent constitutional provision. It is not a provision to make temporary arrangements for the period between the establishment of the Constitution and the making of Commonwealth laws. It applies to a person, who, in 1901, had or who, in the future, acquires particular voting rights by the laws of a State."

Justice Gibbs was more reserved, saying:

"The view of Quick and Garran, that s.41 assures the right to vote at Commonwealth elections only to persons whose right to vote at State elections was acquired before the framing of a franchise by the Commonwealth Parliament... is far from clearly correct, but I find it unnecessary to express a final opinion upon it."

Although the court did not reach a conclusion about the nature of section 41, since it was unnecessary to decide that question, the various judgments did indicate that the section was not a temporary or transitional provision, but was rather a guarantee of the right to vote for all who could vote in their state.

== Consequences ==
At the 1972 federal election, later in the year, the Whitlam Labor government was elected, with Lionel Murphy becoming the new Attorney-General. The Whitlam government lowered the voting age at federal elections to 18 in 1973. The states of Victoria, Tasmania and Queensland, which still had a voting age of 21, soon lowered their voting ages to 18 also.

The issue of the nature of section 41, which had not been decided in this case, was considered again in 1983 in the case of R v Pearson; Ex parte Sipka. By that time, Lionel Murphy had been appointed to the High Court, and was able to advocate his interpretation of the section. However, Murphy was in lone dissent, since the six other justices took the narrower view of the section.
