= R v Pearson; Ex parte Sipka =

Judgement of the High Court of Australia

- Court: High Court of Australia
- Full case name: R v Pearson; Ex parte Sipka. R v Pearson; Ex parte Kleppich. R v Pearson; Ex parte Chapman. R v Pearson; Ex parte Walters.
- Decided: 24 February 1983
- Citations: [1983] HCA 6, (1983) 152 CLR 254

Case history
- Prior action: none
- Subsequent action: none

Court membership
- Judges sitting: Gibbs CJ, Mason, Murphy, Wilson, Brennan, Deane & Dawson JJ

Case opinions
- (6:1) section 41 of the Australian Constitution only preserves rights which existed before the passing of the Commonwealth Franchise Act 1902 (per Gibbs CJ, Mason, Wilson, Brennan, Deane & Dawson JJ) (6:1) none of the applicants had acquired a right to vote in a State election before the passing of the Commonwealth Franchise Act 1902 (per Gibbs CJ, Mason, Wilson, Brennan, Deane & Dawson JJ)

R v Pearson; Ex parte Sipka, was a landmark Australian court case decided in the High Court of Australia on 24 February 1983. It concerned section 41 of the Australian Constitution, and the question of whether four people eligible to vote in New South Wales could be prevented from voting at the federal level by a federal law which closed registration to vote on the day that the writs of election were issued. The court decided that they could, adopting a narrow interpretation of section 41, and therefore finding that there is no express constitutional right to vote in Australia.

== Background to the case ==
In 1983, section 45 of the Commonwealth Electoral Act 1918 provided that:

45 (a) Claims for enrolment... which are received by the Registrar after six o'clock in the afternoon of the day of the issue of the writ for an election shall not be registered until after the close of polling at the election.

This closed the electoral roll on the day when an election was called, so that anyone who had not registered before it was called would not be able to vote.

Federal elections in Australia are held at irregular intervals, but are usually about three years apart. However, in 1983, Liberal Prime Minister Malcolm Fraser was keen to call an early election. Popular union leader Bob Hawke had been elected to the Australian House of Representatives in the 1980 election, for the Australian Labor Party (ALP), and was moving to challenge the ALP leader Bill Hayden. Fraser thought his chances were better against Hayden than against Hawke, and so he wanted to hold the election before Hawke could take over the leadership.

Fraser requested a double dissolution election (an election for the entire Parliament of Australia, including both tranches of Senators), which was granted by Governor-General of Australia Ninian Stephen on 3 February, with the election date set for 5 March. The writs were issued on 4 February, which meant that the electoral roll was effectively closed at 6 o'clock on that day.

Jarka Sipka, Rudolf Kleppich, Murray Chapman and Sarah Walters were four people from New South Wales who were entitled to vote in New South Wales elections, but had not enrolled to vote in federal elections. When they applied to be put on the electoral roll, the Registrar refused to put their names on the roll until after the election, because the roll was already closed. Sipka and Chapman could have enrolled before the writs were issued, had they so chosen, but Kleppich and Walters could only have enrolled on or after 15 February, because Kleppich was not naturalised until that date, and Walters did not turn eighteen (the minimum voting age) until that date.

The four applied to the High Court of Australia for writs of mandamus compelling several people, including Pearson, the Australian Electoral Officer for New South Wales, to appear before the court to show cause why they should not be ordered to register the four people. The court granted the writs, and the hearings were held on 16 and 17 February.

== Arguments ==
The main argument for the four people was based on section 41 of the Constitution of Australia. That section provides that:

41. No adult person who has or acquires a right to vote at elections for the more numerous House of the Parliament of a State shall, while the right continues, be prevented by any law of the Commonwealth from voting at elections for either House of the Parliament of the Commonwealth.

The argument was that, because all four were adult persons who had a right to vote in elections for the New South Wales Legislative Assembly (the more numerous house of the Parliament of New South Wales), they therefore could not be prevented from enrolling or voting in federal elections by any provisions of the Commonwealth Electoral Act 1918.

There were two other main potential interpretations of section 41, both of which suggested that the section was only ever intended to be a transitional provision, to preserve the status quo until the Parliament of Australia could pass its own laws about elections and voting. The first interpretation was that section 41 only applied to people who were already entitled to vote when the Constitution of Australia came into effect, an argument first advanced by William Harrison Moore. The second argument was that it could apply to people who acquired a right after the Constitution came into effect, but only if they acquired that right on the basis of a state law which was in force before the Constitution came into effect, an argument put forward by John Quick and Robert Garran. The four people argued that neither of these interpretations should apply, because section 41 was not a transitional provision. They argued that if it were, it would have been worded like other transitional provisions, including the usual phrase "until Parliament otherwise provides".

The issue of section 41 had been considered, but not resolved, by the High Court in the earlier case of King v Jones, (that case was decided on a different basis, and it was unnecessary to reach a definite answer to this question). The four people argued that the obiter dicta in that case supported their interpretation of section 41, that it was a guarantee rather than a transitional provision.

The Commonwealth electoral officers, who were represented by the Solicitor-General of Australia Sir Maurice Byers, and William Gummow (a future Justice of the High Court), argued that section 41 was indeed intended to be a transitional provision. They linked it with section 8, and section 30 of the Constitution of Australia, which provide that until the federal parliament made laws on the matter, the qualification of electors for the Senate (section 8) and the House of Representatives (section 30) would be determined by state laws. Sir Maurice said:

"Section 41 refers to adult persons who had a right to vote in State elections at the establishment of the Commonwealth, and those who acquired such a right under State law before the establishment of the federal franchise. Pending that establishment, the right to vote was defined in ss 8 and 30 of the Constitution by reference to electors' qualifications from the more numerous State House. These sections speak of circumstances existing at the establishment of the Commonwealth and thereafter until the commencement of a federal law. They envisage the displacement of the Constitutional suffrage by a federal suffrage established by Parliament."

Thus, their argument was that only rights existing before the passing of the Commonwealth Franchise Act 1902 (the first federal law to deal with the federal franchise) would be protected by section 41.

== Judgment ==
Only a week after the hearings, on 24 February, the High Court reached its decision. Three judgments were delivered, Chief Justice Gibbs and Justices Mason and Wilson delivered one judgment, Justices Brennan, Deane and Dawson delivering a second, concurring judgment.

The six majority judges decided that section 41 was indeed a transitional provision, which only operated as a restraint on the first law that the Parliament of Australia passed concerning the federal franchise, the Commonwealth Franchise Act 1902. That is, section 41 only protected rights which were in existence before the Franchise Act was passed. No new rights protectable by section 41 could be acquired after that time. Because the four people in this case did not acquire their right to vote in state elections until well after 1902, section 41 did not give them a right to vote in federal elections.

Justices Brennan, Deane and Dawson said:

"Though it is right to see s 41 as a constitutional guarantee of the right to vote, the means by which that guarantee is secured is itself definitive of the extent of the guarantee. Voting, that is, the exercise of an existing right to vote, at elections of the Commonwealth Parliament cannot 'be prevented by any law of the Commonwealth'. But s 41 does not in terms confer a right to vote."

They said that if the construction suggested by the applicants was correct, then:

"the power conferred upon the Parliament to legislate for a uniform franchise would be destroyed. A Parliament of a State would be empowered to give the federal franchise to those whom the Commonwealth Parliament has excluded or disqualified, for example, property owners who do not live in the State, aliens, prohibited immigrants or convicts under sentence for more serious offences."

Thus, for policy and historical reasons, the majority decided that the narrower interpretation of section 41 should be adopted.

=== Murphy's dissent ===
The lone dissenting judgment was delivered by Justice Murphy, who before his appointment to the High Court had represented the applicant who was denied enrolment in the previous case to consider section 41, King v Jones. Murphy took the view that section 41 was a constitutional guarantee of the right to vote, and that it should be interpreted on its plain meaning, that at any given time, all persons with a right to vote in state elections had a corresponding right to vote in federal elections. He said:

"Section 41 is one of the few guarantees of the rights of persons in the Australian Constitution. It should be given the purposive interpretation which accords with its plain words, with its context of other provisions of unlimited duration, and its contrast with transitional provisions. Constitutions are to read broadly and not pedantically. Guarantees of personal rights should not be read narrowly. A right to vote is so precious that it should not read out of the Constitution by implication."

Murphy also referred to the history of section 41 in the Convention Debates, in particular the records of 3 March 1898, where Edmund Barton proposed that the clause which would become section 41 should explicitly apply only to electors who had the right to vote at state level "at the establishment of the Commonwealth or afterwards [acquires] under the law in force in any state at the establishment of the Commonwealth." But Barton faced opposition. Alexander Peacock expressed concern that if Victoria followed South Australia in granting women's suffrage, but did so after Federation, then Barton's clause would not protect their rights federally. The president of the convention, Charles Kingston, was also sceptical. Frederick Holder said that "If the clause is altered as our leader wishes it to be altered, the right of the state Parliaments to expand the franchise would cease on the establishment of the Commonwealth, and the federal action in reference to the franchise might not be taken for some years." Barton's proposal was defeated, and the broader wording remained, and so in Murphy's view, the history of section 41 demanded that it not be regarded as a transitional provision.

Murphy reached the conclusion that section 41 did give the four people a right to vote at a federal level, since they had a right to vote in New South Wales. However, Murphy was the only judge to reach this conclusion.

== Consequences ==
The four applicants were thus prevented from voting in the 1983 election.

Unbeknownst to Malcolm Fraser in Canberra, on the day that the election was called Bill Hayden's supporters were moving against him in Brisbane. They encouraged Hayden to resign, and he did so, with Hawke elected leader of the ALP unopposed. Thus Fraser's attempt to preempt a leadership change had backfired, and at the election, Fraser was defeated by Hawke.

In 1988, the Hawke government appointed a Constitutional Commission (chaired by the lawyer for the Commonwealth officers in this case, Maurice Byers) which was tasked with investigation options to reform the Constitution. Out of the resulting report, the Hawke government drew four main proposals, which were put to the people of Australia as referendums later in the year. Of the four referendum questions proposed, one, titled Fair Elections, included a proposal to remove section 41, and replace it with a clear guarantee of the right to vote. However, the referendum failed, attracting only 37.59% support nationally.
