= Māori Australians =

Australians of Māori heritage

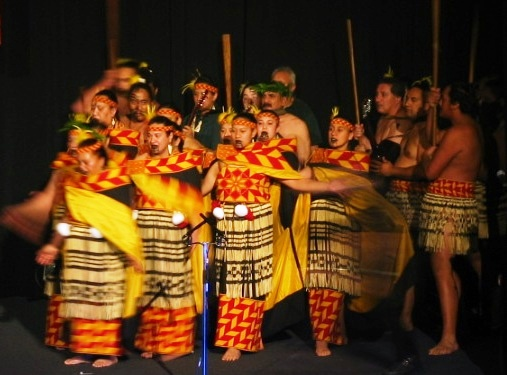

Total population
- 140,000–170,000

Regions with significant populations
- New South Wales, Queensland, Victoria, Western Australia, South Australia

Languages
- English, Māori

Religion
- Christianity, Māori religion

Related ethnic groups
- Other Polynesians

Māori Australians (Māori: ngā tangata Māori i Ahitereiria) are Australians of Māori heritage. The Māori presence in Australia dates back to the 19th century when Māori travelled to Sydney to trade, acquire new technology, and learn new ideas. The Māori population in Australia remained marginal until the 1960s. During the second half of the 20th and early 21st centuries, thousands of Māori emigrated from New Zealand to pursue employment opportunities in blue collar occupations such as shearing, construction, manufacturing, and mining. In 2013, there were approximately 140,000–170,000 people with Māori ancestry living in Australia. Māori Australians constitute Australia's largest Polynesian ethnic group.

== History ==
People with Māori ancestry as a percentage of the population in Australia divided geographically by statistical local area, as of the 2011 census

=== 19th century ===
There was no known prehistoric contact between Australian Aboriginal people and New Zealand Māori, although the Polynesian ancestors of Māori were accomplished navigators, who did establish short-lived settlements on Norfolk Island. The first Māori known to have visited Australia travelled to Sydney (then known as Port Jackson, or Poihākena in Māori) in 1793. Ngahuruhuru and Tuki Tahua from the Bay of Islands were taken against their will by Governor Philip Gidley King to Norfolk Island, in an attempt to teach flax-weaving to the convicts there, and then to Port Jackson. They remained as guests of Governor King before returning to the Bay of Islands.

Māori chiefs continued to trade with Europeans in Australia, bringing back rare goods to New Zealand. An 1823 image of Sydney depicts the presence of Māori. There were at least 700 Māori visitors to Sydney prior to 1840, with some of the more notable being the chiefs Te Pahi, Ruatara, Hongi Hika, Taonui, Patuone, Rewa and Te Wharerahi. These visiting Māori participated in commercial trade and were employed on the many vessels visiting or based in Sydney, particularly whaling vessels. Many Māori lived in the Rocks area around the Whaler's Arms tavern, reflected in the streetname "Maori Lane".

=== 20th century ===
==== Avoiding the White Australia Policy, 1902–1950s ====
Māori generally benefited from the same immigration and voting rights as white New Zealanders in Australia, making them a notable exception to the White Australia policy. In 1902, with the Commonwealth Franchise Act, Māori residents in Australia were granted the right to vote, a right denied to Indigenous Australians. During that same period, their right to settle in Australia was facilitated by their shared status as British subjects. The Australian government granted equal rights to Māori only reluctantly. In 1905, the New Zealand government made a formal complaint about the exclusion of two Māori shearers, after which the Australian government changed its customs regulations to allow Māori to freely enter the country. Other Pacific Islanders were still subject to the White Australia policy.

In 1948, Australian immigration minister Arthur Calwell ordered the deportation of three Tongan women, the wife and daughters of an Australian man. He was subsequently questioned in parliament whether the same standard would apply to Māori, and stated "within the meaning of the Immigration Act, they [Māori and Tongans] are regarded as the same people, and under existing law and practice, such people will not be permitted to settle permanently in Australia". Calwell's comments caused an international incident and "triggered outrage in New Zealand". The country's prime minister Peter Fraser stated that "any hint of discrimination, against our Maori fellow citizens would be indignantly and bitterly resented as an unforgivable insult to our country and every one of us". Calwell subsequently reversed his previous statement and allowed Māori to continue entering Australia on the same terms as white New Zealanders.

==== Māori migration wave, 1960s–1990s ====
Some of the Māori who travelled to Australia from the 1840s onwards remained in Australia. From the 1960s, thousands of Māori migrated to Australia seeking new life and work opportunities in Sydney, which ushered in a wave of Māori emigration to Australia during the second half of the 20th century. The author, film-maker, and historian Bradford Haami argues that Māori emigration from New Zealand was motivated by economic opportunities overseas, particularly Australia, growing unemployment in New Zealand, and a desire to escape the perceived discriminatory attitudes of European New Zealanders in the work force.

In the 1970s and 1980s, Māori hit by a downturn in their home country's economy emigrated to Australia in search of work. Between 1984 and 1999, the closure of the freezing works and factory industries in New Zealand, where the majority of Māori were employed, led many to emigrate to Australia. Māori immigrants to Australia sought work in blue collar occupations such as construction, mining, seasonal work such as sheep shearing, security, truck driving, entertainment, and the horse-raising industry. In addition, Māori migrants sought employment as correction officers and in the Australian Army. Māori migrants in Australia developed a reputation as hard workers among employers.

Māori migrants also found work in the Australian sheep shearing industry. Māori shearers preferred the wider 86-mm comb over the standard Australian regulation 64-mm comb since it increased the rate of production. The use of the 86-mm comb created friction between Australian and expatriate New Zealand shearers, leading to a ten-week strike organized by the Australian Workers' Union in 1983. The dispute was resolved with the allowance of wider combs for increased productivity. As of 2018, Māori are still well represented in the shearing industry.

In 1998, a survey of 1,149 New Zealand-born Maori in Australia conducted by Te Puni Kōkiri, the Department for Māori Development, found that motivations for emigrating to Australia included better employment opportunities, family reunification, starting a new life, seeking better weather, education, and sports, and to escape Māori politics or negative experiences in New Zealand. In addition, some Māori men came to Australia to play rugby while others migrated to avoid having to pay child support to their families. Other Māori emigrated to Australia to escape abusive relationships and domestic violence in their families.

=== 21st century ===
In 2001, the Australian Government tightened immigration regulations. While New Zealanders arriving in Australia have freedom to work through a non-protected Special Category Visa, they are unable to access social security, tertiary student loans, and other economic opportunities unless they obtain permanent residence. These policy changes have affected Māori in Australia. According to Haami, half of all New Zealand-born Māori who arrived prior to 1971 are Australian citizens. In 2011, only 23.3% of Māori who had lived in Australia for at least five years had attained Australian citizenship. This was a lower figure than other migrant ancestry groups with the exception of Japanese Australians. In 2011, it was also estimated that only 16.6% of Māori living in Australia held Australian citizenship; significant lower than the 38% observed for non-Māori New Zealanders in Australia.

In December 2014, the Australian Government amended the Migration Act to facilitate the cancellation of visas for non-citizens who had served a prison sentence of more than 12 months and "character grounds." This character test also targets non-citizens who have lived for most of their life in Australia or have roots there. As of July 2018, 1,300 had been deported from Australia. Of these, at least 60% were of Māori and Pasifika descent. This has strained Australia–New Zealand relations; with Australian officials defending their "tough on crime" policy and New Zealand officials countering that it undermines the historic bonds of "mateship" and free movement between the two countries.

According to a 2014 report published by the Bay of Plenty Regional Council, legislative restrictions on access to social security, student loans, and housing, an economic downturn in Australia, and perceived racism has led a growing number of Australian-based Māori to return to New Zealand. In addition, pull factors for returning to New Zealand included trade work opportunities in Auckland and Christchurch, and better family and lifestyle options in New Zealand. While the majority of returnees have settled in main centres like Auckland, others have returned to provincial centres like the Bay of Plenty. In 2013, 14% of Australian Māori returnees lived in Bay of Plenty compared to 8% of NZ European returnees from Australia. While the majority of European returnees were in the 30-39 age and 60 and over age brackets, the majority of Māori returnees were families with children under the age of 14 years.

In mid-August 2019, a Māori group known as the Ngāti Rangihou Kanguru hapū laid claim to 112 acres of land in Parramatta in Sydney, claiming that local Indigenous Australian leaders had entrusted the land to the Māori King with the help of Anglican priest Samuel Marsden. The disputed land is in an eastern section of central Parramatta and takes in several parks and reserves. Earlier in March 2019, the Māori group had occupied the land for several days before being evicted. The City of Parramatta Council has applied in court to have the claim dismissed.

In mid-April 2023, the Australian Government announced a new direct citizenship pathway for New Zealanders living in Australia including Māori. Under the new policy, Special Category Visa holders who have resided for at least four years in Australia and meet other residency requirements will be able to apply for Australian citizenship, commencing 1 July 2023. In addition, children born in Australia to a New Zealander from 1 July 2023 will automatically be eligible for New Zealand citizenship. The announcement was welcomed by New Zealand Prime Minister Chris Hipkins and Oz Kiwi chairperson Joanne Cox for improving New Zealanders' access to Australian citizenship and social security while reducing the number of New Zealanders deported from Australia under the Section 501 policy.

== Demographics ==
A 1933 census indicated there were 197 Māori living in Australia. That number increased to 449 in 1961, 862 in 1966, 26,000 in 1986 and 84,000 in 2001. According to Haami, the number of Māori emigrating to Australia rose from 290 in 1960 to 1,750 in 1967. By 1966, Australia was home to an estimated 4,000 Māori. The number of New Zealand-born Māori also rose from 1,379 in 1971 to 4,445 between 1976 and 1980. Between 1986 and 1990, this figure rose to 7,638. The 1986 Australian census found that there were approximately 27,000 Māori living in Australia.

The 2001 Australian census found that the Māori population in New Zealand numbered 101,100. The 2001 census also revealed that 35.5% of the Australian Māori population lived in New South Wales, 29.7% in Queensland (including 19,000 in Brisbane), 14% in Victoria, and 6% in other territories. Of the 79,000 resident Māori who identified their iwi/tribal affiliations, 20,000 were Ngāpuhi, 12,500 Ngāti Porou, 11,500 Waikato, 10,000 Ngāti Kahungunu, and 3,000 Ngāi Tahu. There were also around 30,000 to 45,000 Ngāpuhi residing in Sydney and the Gold Coast.

There are significant Māori communities in certain suburbs of Sydney (Penrith, Parramatta, Liverpool, Blacktown, Campbelltown) as well as Brisbane (Woodridge, Forest Lake, Wynnum, Redbank), Gold Coast, Darwin, Melbourne and Perth. In 2001, there were 19,000 Māori living in Brisbane. By 2013, a Dominion Post report estimated that there were more Māori living in Queensland than in ten of New Zealand's sixteen regions.

In 2007, the co-leader of New Zealand's Māori Party, Pita Sharples, proposed the creation of an additional overseas seat in the New Zealand Parliament for Māori living in Australia. The 2011 Australian census found there were 128,420 Māori living in Australia. Two-thirds of this population were born in New Zealand. Based on this census, it was estimated that as much as one-sixth of the Māori population lived in Australia and that one in three Māori in Australia were born there, with 80% of this generation being under the age of 25.

== Socioeconomics ==
=== Citizenship ===
According to the 2011 Australian census, only 16.6% of New Zealand–born Māori hold Australian citizenship. By contrast, the figure is 38% for New Zealand–born non-Māori and 63.7% for other people not born in Australia. Half of New Zealand–born Māori who arrived prior to 1971 are Australian citizens with the figure decreasing the more recently they arrived. The reduced citizenship rates among Māori reflects legislative changes to Australia's immigration policy in 2001 including the establishment of a Special Category Visa for New Zealand citizens, which allows them to work but limits access to social security benefits.

=== Education ===
In 2011, only 45.2% of New Zealand–born Māori between the ages of 25 and 54 years living in Australia had graduated high school with a Year 12 qualification. Only about 6% of NZ–born Māori men held a bachelor's degree, compared to the Australian national average of 26% for men. Only a small proportion of Māori migrant men between the ages of 20 and 29 years were enrolled in university education. According to Te Puni Kōkiri, 54% of Australian-born Māori have high school qualifications in comparison to 55% for non-Māori New Zealanders and the Australian national average of 59%.

According to Te Puni Kōkiri, 59 percent of Māori within the prime working age population (25 to 54 years) have no tertiary qualification, compared with 37% of the Australian prime working population and 41% of New Zealand-born non-Māori. Dr Tahu Kukutai and Dr Shefali Pawar, of the National Institute of Demographic and Economic Analysis (NIDEA) at the University of Waikato, have attributed the lower Māori participation in tertiary education to changes to immigration legislation in 2001 which restricted access to social security and student loans for Australian non-citizens.

=== Employment ===
In 2013, 84% of Māori in Australia between the ages of 25 and 54 years were participating in the Australian labour force. In 2011, the labour force participation rate for New Zealand–born Māori males was 92.6% while that for Australian–born Māori was 87.5% due to the latter's higher participation in tertiary education. An estimated 89% of Māori migrant women in Australia were employed. Female Māori participation in the Australian workforce was 76%, a gendered difference consistent with both Māori and non-Māori as well as NZ-born and Australian-born.

In 2011, Māori who lived and worked in Australia were disproportionately represented in lower-skilled occupations and under-represented in skilled occupations in comparison to the Australian national work force. Almost half of Māori in Australia worked as labourers, machinery operators, or drivers. Less than one third of Māori in Australia were employed in skilled occupations such as managers, professionals, and technicians and trades workers, compared with over half for all workers in Australia.

32% of Māori in Australia worked in the construction, manufacturing, and mining sectors, compared with 20% of the Australian working population. In addition, other Māori in Australia worked in occupations such as seasonal work, security, truck driving, and entertainment. Others have also found work as corrections officers and in the Australian Army. In 2011, 28.5% of Māori worked in the construction and manufacturing sectors in comparison to 18.8% of all Australian workers and 21.2% of non-Māori New Zealanders. A further 6.5% of Māori were employed in the mining sector.

In 2011, an estimated 25.3% of Māori living in New South Wales were working in the construction and manufacturing sectors. This figure was similar in neighbouring Queensland where 29.7% of Maori in the state were employed in construction and manufacturing. Meanwhile, 13.7% of Māori living in Western Australia were employed in the mining industry. Only about 7.9% of Māori migrants in Australia were self-employed, compared to the non-Māori New Zealand figure of 14.3% and the Australian national average of 15.3%.

=== Income ===
Māori in Australia on average earn less than others including New Zealand-born non-Māori. According to the 2011 Australian census, the median incomes for prime working age Māori was A$44,556, lower than the Australian median income of A$46,571 and the New Zealand-born non-Maori median income of A$51,619. Māori women in Australia have a median income of A$35,903, compared with A$53,304 for Māori men. This reflects their lower participation in the Australian labour force.

=== Family and childcare ===
In 2011, Māori in Australia had a higher rate of single parents in comparison to the Australian national population. This ranged from 3.4% at the 15–24 years age bracket to 13.2% in the 40–44 years age bracket. In addition, an estimate 40% of Māori in Australia provided unpaid childcare in contrast to the Australian national average of 30%.

== Culture ==
=== Language use ===
In 1986 only 22% of Māori Australians spoke Māori (or Te Reo) at home, and very few children spoke the language. At present, Māori language classes exist in Australia in an attempt to preserve Te Reo there, and there is a Māori-language radio station in Sydney. In 2011, 6.3% of Māori living in Australia spoke Te Reo at home; a slight increase from the 5.7% recorded in 2006. In addition, 8.2% of NZ-born Māori spoke Te Reo at home, compared to 2.4% of Australian-born Māori.

=== Music and performing arts ===
Between the 1950s and 1980s, several Māori showbands emigrated to Australia to exploit opportunities in the music entertainment industry and to escape perceived racism at New Zealand music venues. Some notable showbands have included Gugi and Nuki Waaka's Maori Volcanics Showband, Prince Tui Teka's The Maori Troubadours, the Māori Hi-Five, the Quin Tikis, Māori Kavaliers, the Māori Castaways, and the Young Polynesians. The showband era began waning during the late 1970s, leading many musicians to continue their careers as soloists or smaller cabaret groups that played in north Queensland, Sydney, and the Gold Coast. While some returned to New Zealand, other showband families stayed in Australia.

One notable musician was the Young Polynesian Darren Rehu, who played kapa haka and featured as a child star on QTQ-9's Happy Go 'Round show. Darren later played on the Auckland music circuit with popular jazz/funk band 358s. He also played backing for the state productions of Jesus Christ Superstar and The Lion King musical in Australia. Rehu subsequently migrated to the United Kingdom in 2005, joining the Māori diaspora there.

Sydney was also home to two kapa haka (traditional Māori performance arts) groups Te Huinga Waka and Tupuranga. Te Huinga Waka has competed in New Zealand kapa haka competitions since 1988.

=== Marae ===
Following about 40 years of dialogue between Māori and Aboriginal Australian elders, the two parties mutually agreed to build a marae in Sydney. In 2022, the Sydney Marae Alliance (SMA) received approval to occupy land on the Hyland Road Reserve in Western Sydney. In June 2024, the SMA received consent from the New South Wales Planning and Development Department and the Cumberland City Council to build a marae on the 15-hectare block. The building is expected to be built in three phases. The first consists of the construction of three buildings at a cost of A$8 million while the second and third phases will consist of the design, carvings, horticulture, planting and the pathways. By early September 2025, the Sydney Marae Alliance had raised NZ$5.3 million through fundraising events. The SMA also received a A$1 million contribution from the Australian Government.

=== Sports ===
Several Australian-based Māori have built successful careers in various sports including rugby union, rugby league, and volleyball. Stewart Simpson emigrated from Kawerau to Australia to play rugby and subsequently became the manager of the Australian national beach volleyball team. Another Māori Australian is Danielle Drady, a former professional squash player who became the World Number 2 woman player of 1991. She later established the first squash and fitness academy at the Emirates Golf and Country Club in Dubai.

Other notable Māori Australian sportspersons have included former Australian Kangaroos player Ted Goodwin, Australian Football League player Wayne Schwass, rugby union player Jeremy Paul, and Newcastle Knights player Timana Tahu, and long jumper Jai Taurima.

=== Notable Māori Australians ===
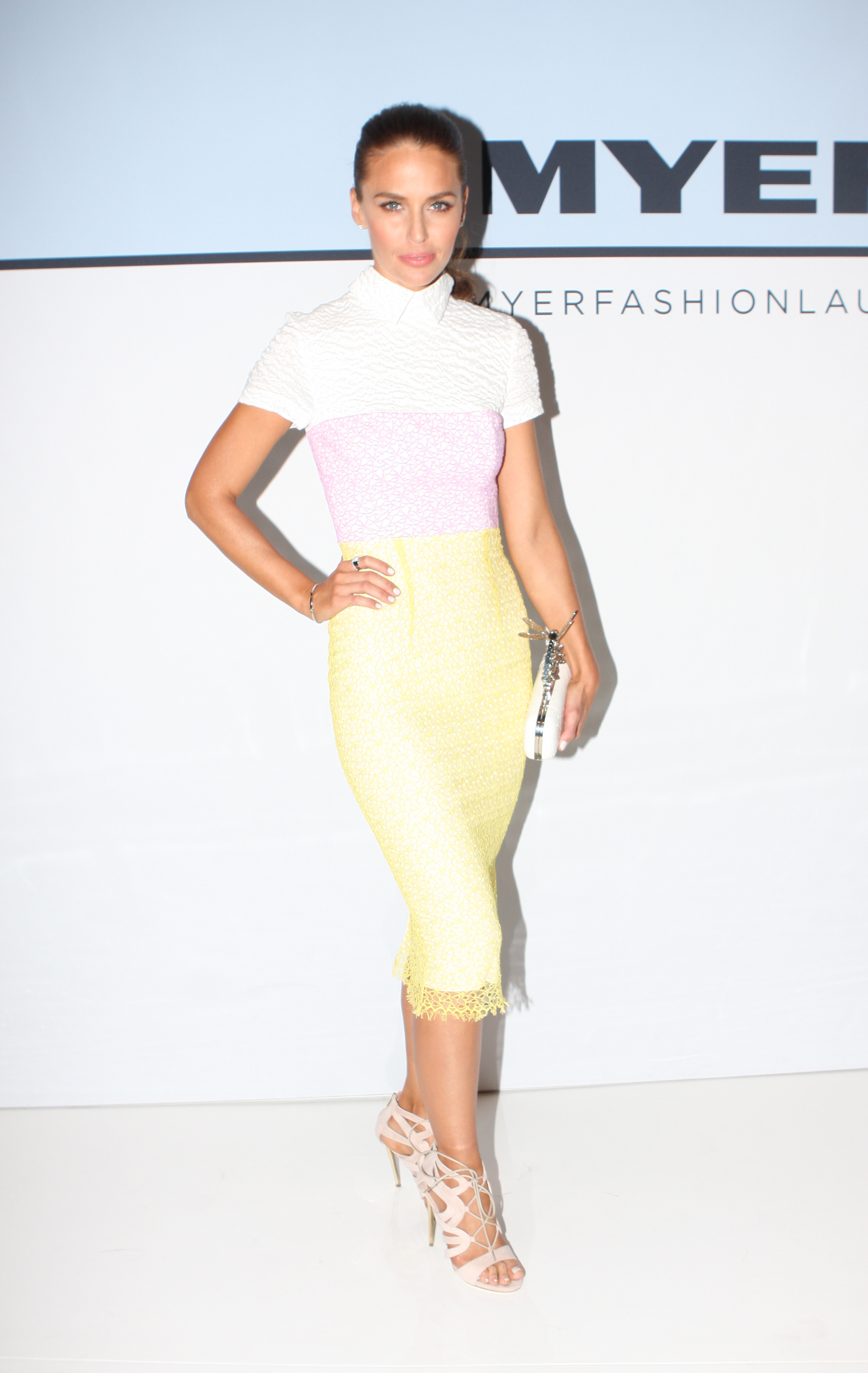
Jodi Anasta

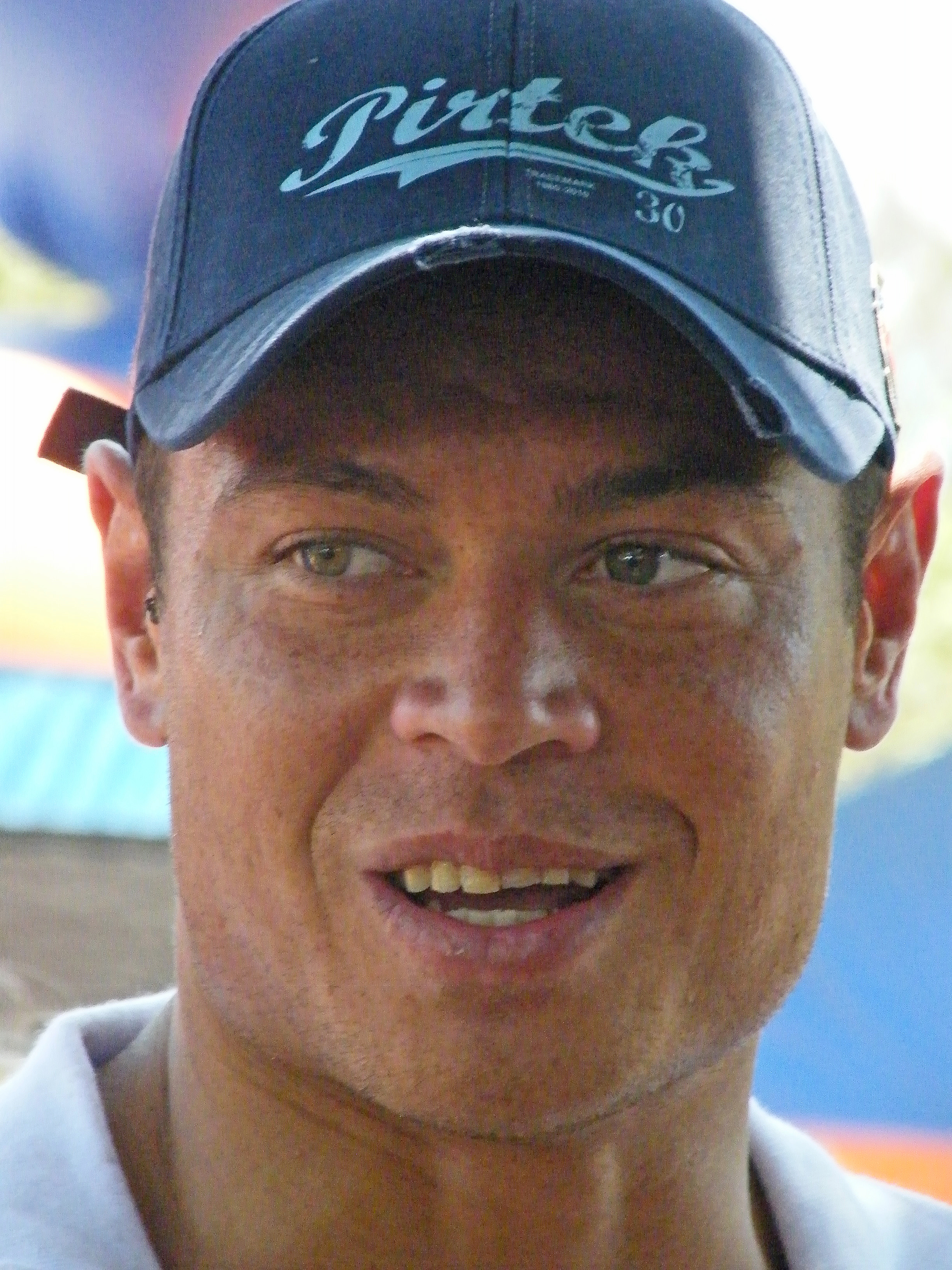
Timana Tahu

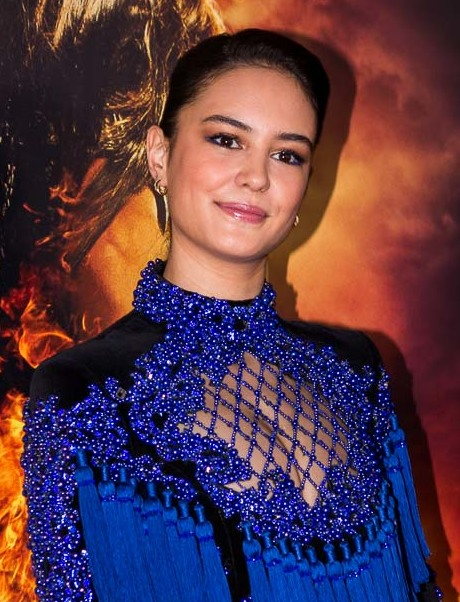
Courtney Eaton

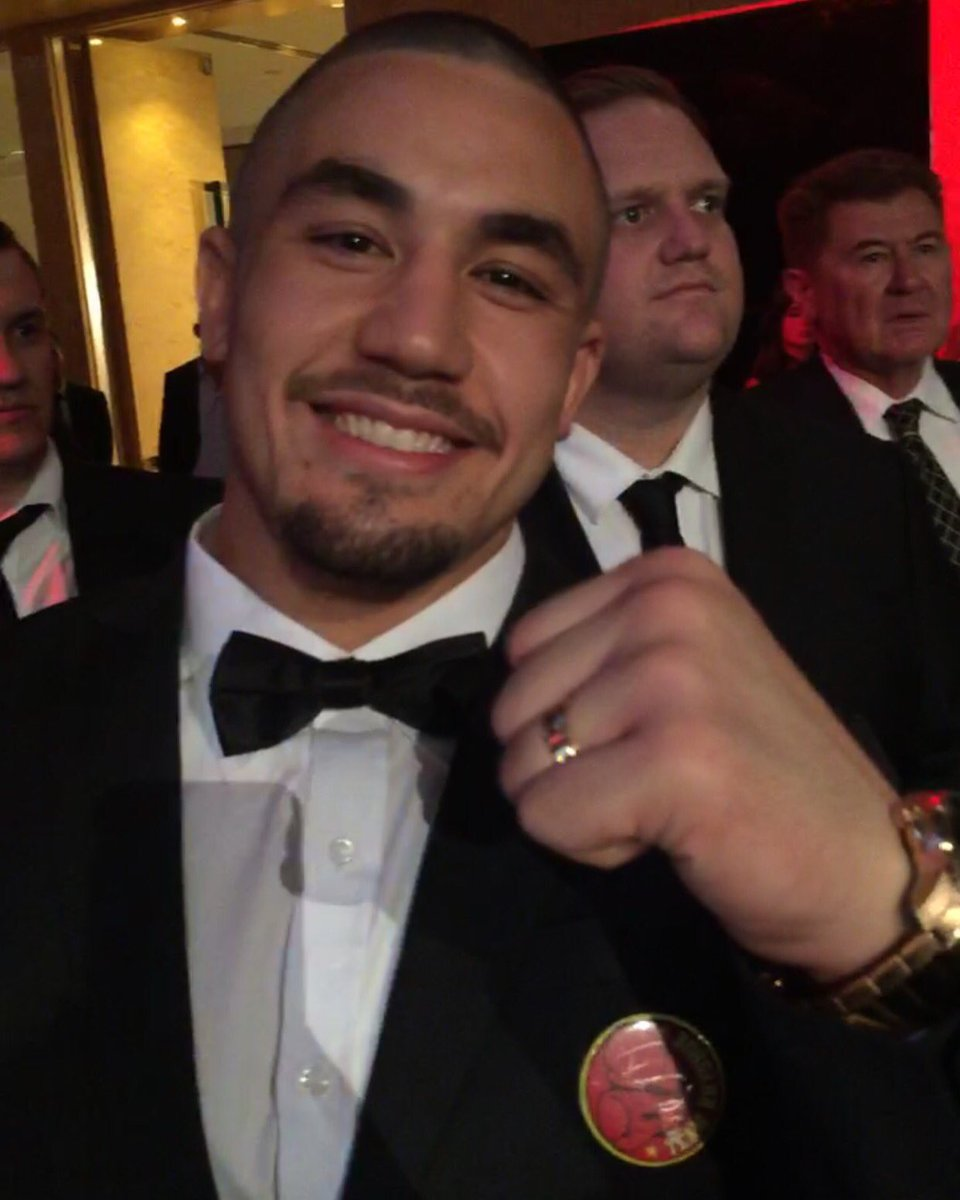
Robert Whittaker

- Jodi Anasta - Actress and model
- Gerard Beale - Rugby league player
- Manu Bennett - Actor
- Paul Bower - Australian rules footballer
- Greg Broughton - Australian rules footballer
- Ricki-Lee Coulter - Singer
- Keisha Castle-Hughes - Actress
- Nathan Cayless - Rugby league player
- Quade Cooper - Rugby union player
- Richelle Cranston - Australian rules footballer
- Russell Crowe - Film director and actor
- Danny Dickfos - Australian rules footballer
- Donald Dickie - Australian rules footballer
- Gen Fricker - Comedian
- Dane Gagai - Rugby league player
- Megan Gale - Model
- Ted Goodwin - Rugby league player
- Courtney Eaton - Actress and model
- Zac Fisher - Australian rules footballer
- Josh Hoffman - Rugby league player
- Valentine Holmes - Rugby league player
- Calum Hood - Bassist in 5 Seconds Of Summer
- Moana Hope - Australian rules footballer
- Poppy Kelly - Australian rules footballer
- Jarome Luai - Rugby league player
- Deborah Mailman - Actress
- Dustin Martin - Australian rules footballer
- Teia Miles - Australian rules footballer
- Daniel McAlister - Australian rules footballer
- Colleen McCullough - Author
- Callan Mulvey - Actor
- Kotuku Ngawati - Swimmer
- Ruban Nielson - Musician
- Corey Norman - Rugby league player
- Jeremy Paul - Rugby union player
- Brett Peake - Australian rules footballer
- Brian Peake - Australian rules footballer
- Kalyn Ponga - Rugby league player
- Shane Savage - Australian rules footballer
- Wayne Schwass - Australian rules footballer
- William Singe - Singer and songwriter
- Chase Stanley - Rugby league player
- Luke Steele - Musician
- Timana Tahu - Rugby League player
- James Tamou - Rugby league player
- Kevin Taumata - Actor
- Jai Taurima - Long jumper
- Jesse Tawhiao-Wardlaw - Australian rules footballer
- Stevie-Lee Thompson - Australian rules footballer
- Morgan Turinui - Rugby union player
- Stan Walker - Singer
- Reece Walsh - Rugby league player
- Robert Whittaker - Mixed martial artist
- Marley Williams - Australian rules footballer
- Archie Thompson - Footballer
- Jordan Riki - Rugby League Player

== See also ==
- New Zealand Australians
- Māori Americans
