= Section 41 of the Constitution of Australia =

Provision on the right of electors of States

Section 41 of the Australian Constitution is a provision within Chapter I, Part IV of the Constitution of Australia. It deals with the right of electors of States. During the time of federation, section 41 was used to ensure that no one that was enfranchised under the Constitution would be disenfranchised by the introduction of a replacement statutorily defined franchise. Modern case law—specifically those since R v Pearson; Ex parte Sipka in 1983—have concluded that this section no longer has any actual effect, and that no express right to vote in Australia can be inferred from it.

== Text ==
No adult person who has or acquires a right to vote at elections for the more numerous House of the Parliament of a State shall, while the right continues, be prevented by any law of the Commonwealth from voting at elections for either House of the Parliament of the Commonwealth.

== Historical importance ==
=== Women's suffrage ===
At the time that the Australian Constitution was drafted, South Australia was the only state which allowed women to vote. The drafters feared that if the Constitution did not allow South Australian women to vote in federal elections, they would vote against federalism. Section 41 therefore would allow South Australian women to vote in federal elections, without conferring the vote on women who were not yet allowed to vote in the other states.

== Modern interpretation ==
=== King v Jones ===
- King v Jones: The words "adult person" are fixed with the same meaning they had when the Constitution came into effect, that is, they refer to persons over the age of 21, no matter the contemporary interpretation.

=== R v Pearson; Ex parte Sipka ===
- R v Pearson; Ex parte Sipka: The section is only provisional; rights acquired after the passage of the Commonwealth Franchise Act 1902 are not protected. In essence, there is no constitutional right to vote in Commonwealth elections.
