= Māori voting rights in Australia =

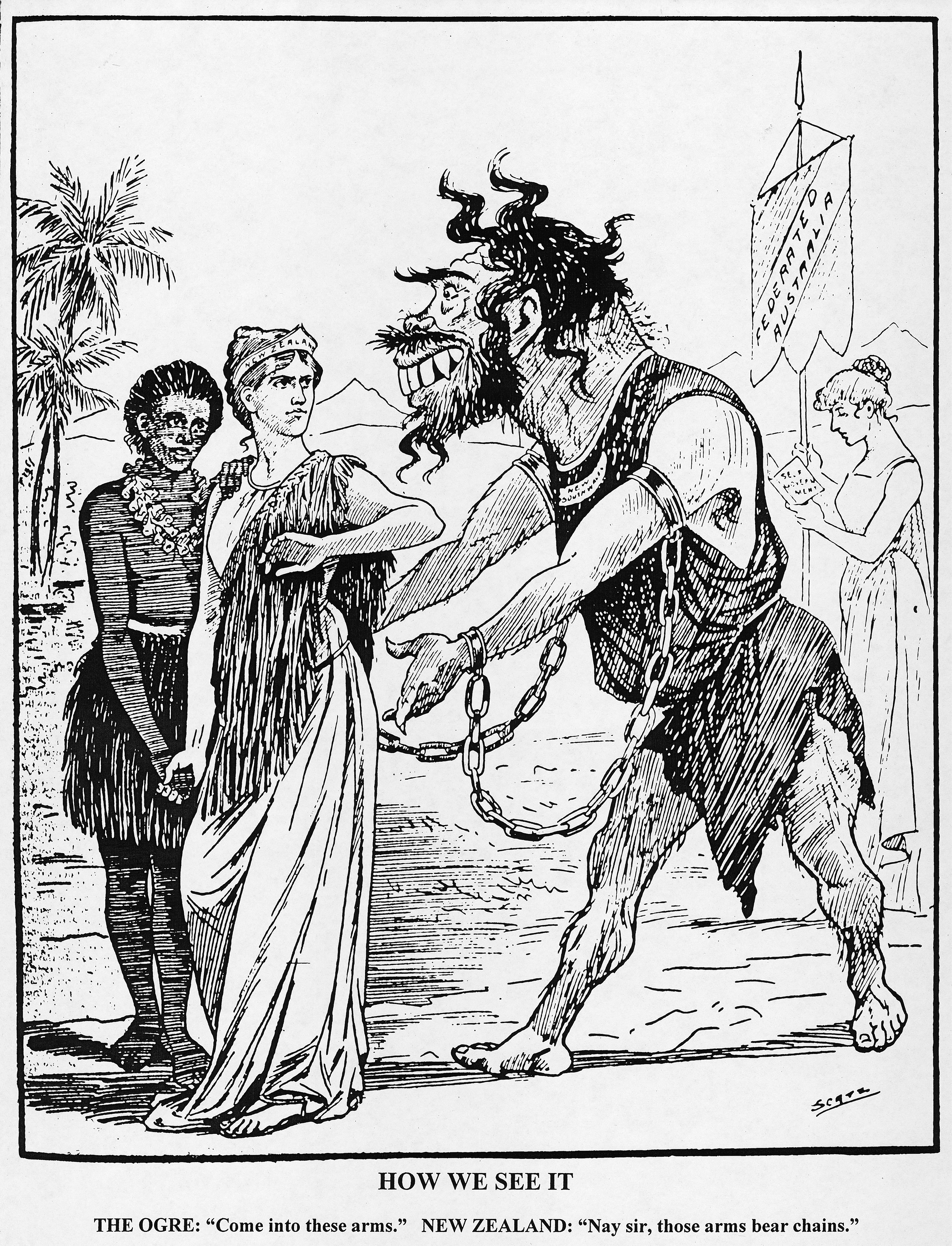
A contemporary cartoon portraying New Zealand's reaction to Australia's offer to join its Federation.

Māori voting rights in Australia have an unusual history compared to voting rights for other non-white minorities. Male Māori Australians were first given the vote through the Commonwealth Franchise Act 1902, which specifically limited voting enrollment to persons of European descent, and aboriginal natives of New Zealand, in an effort to allay New Zealand's concerns about joining the Federation of Australia. During the parliamentary debates over the Act, leading Labor Party member King O'Malley supported the inclusion of Māori, and the exclusion of Aboriginal Australians, in the franchise, arguing that "An aboriginal is not as intelligent as a Māori."

This anomalous condition remained in some jurisdictions (such as the Northern Territory) until 1962, when the Commonwealth Electoral Act superseded the earlier act.

Prior to universal Australian Indigenous franchise, organisations such as the Australian Aborigines' League highlighted the inconsistencies in Australian law that allowed Māori voting rights (as well as old age and disability pensions, maternity bonuses and unemployment relief) but denied them to Aboriginals and Torres Strait Islanders.

== See also ==
- Voting rights of Indigenous Australians
- Suffrage in Australia

== Sources ==
- Attwood, Bain; Markus, Andrew (2004). Thinking Black. Canberra: Aboriginal Studies Press. ISBN 0-85575-459-1.
- Irving, Helen Dorothy (1999). The Centenary Companion to Australian Federation. Melbourne: Cambridge University Press. ISBN 0-521-57314-9.
