= Donald Dickie =

Australian rules footballer

Personal information
- Full name: Donald Dickie
- Born: 8 May 1972 (age 54); New Zealand
- Original team: Norwood (SANFL)
- Draft: Zone selection, 1996 AFL draft Port Adelaide
- Height: 186 cm (6 ft 1 in)
- Weight: 89 kg (196 lb)
- Position: Forward

Playing career^{1}
Years	Club	Games (Goals)
1993	Sturt (SANFL)	4 (0)
1996–2000	Norwood (SANFL)	36 (18)
1997–2000	Port Adelaide	55 (19)
Total		95 (37)
- ^{1} Playing statistics correct to the end of 2000.

Donald Dickie (born 8 May 1972 in New Zealand) is a former professional Australian rules footballer notable for his brief appearance in the Australian Football League for the Port Adelaide Football Club. Dickie was born in New Zealand of a Māori heritage, he is one of few Maori Australians in the history of the VFL/AFL. His family emigrated to South Australia where he played with the Norwood Football Club.

== AFL career ==
=== Port Adelaide career (1997–2000) ===
Dickie was taken at Pick #19 in the pre-season AFL draft as a zone selection.

The wingman became a cult player at Port Adelaide known for his exciting dashing play and hard tackles. At the end of the 1998 AFL season he earned runner up in the John Cahill Medal.

After inconsistent form and complications with ankle injuries Dickie was delisted by the power at the end of 2000 having played a total of 55 games.

== SANFL career ==
=== Coaching career ===
Dickie was an assistant coach with the Sturt Football Club in the SANFL.
