= Voting rights of Indigenous Australians =

The voting rights of Indigenous Australians became an issue from the mid-19th century, when responsible government was being granted to Britain's Australian colonies, and suffrage qualifications were being debated. The resolution of universal rights progressed into the mid-20th century.

Indigenous Australians began to acquire voting rights along with other male British adults living in the Australian colonies from the mid-19th century. In South Australia, Indigenous women also acquired the vote from 1895 onward. However, few exercised these rights. Queensland and Western Australia effectively removed voting rights for Indigenous Australians in the late-19th century.

Following Australian Federation in 1901, the Commonwealth Franchise Act 1902 denied Aboriginal people the right to vote at the federal level unless they were enrolled to vote in a state as at 1 January 1901. State electoral laws continued those of the colonies. From 1949, Aboriginal people could vote at the federal level if they were enfranchised under a state law or were a current or former member of the defence forces. In 1962, the Menzies government amended the Commonwealth Electoral Act 1918 to enable all Indigenous Australians to enrol to vote in Australian federal elections. In 1966, Queensland became the last state to remove restrictions on Indigenous voting in state elections and, as a consequence, all Indigenous Australians in all states and territories had equal voting rights at all levels of government.

== Indigenous voting history ==
Prior to the Commonwealth of Australia Constitution Act 1900 (Imp), each colony of Australia could pass its own legislation concerning the enfranchisement of Indigenous Australians. Differences between the colonies meant Indigenous Australians' right to vote depended on the colony in which they resided.

The Commonwealth of Australia was proclaimed on 1 January 1901. Under the new constitution, the former colonies became states in a federal Commonwealth and a new Commonwealth government was established. The voting laws of the former colonies continued to apply in the states until changed by state legislation. The Commonwealth established new voting laws at the federal level through the Commonwealth Franchise Act 1902.

=== Timeline of Indigenous Australians' right to vote ===
Date	Event
Pre-federation
1829	British sovereignty extended to cover the whole of Australia. Everyone born in Australia, including Aboriginal people, are British subjects by birth.
1850-1900	The Australian colonies become self governing. All adult (21 years) male British subjects, including Indigenous people, were entitled to vote in South Australia from 1856, in Victoria from 1857, New South Wales from 1858, and Tasmania from 1900. Queensland gained self-government in 1859 and Western Australia in 1890.
1885	Queensland Elections Act excluded all Indigenous people from voting
1893	Western Australian law denied the vote to Indigenous people who didn't meet a property qualification.
1895	All adult women in South Australia, including Indigenous women, won the right to vote.
1901	The Commonwealth Constitution came into effect, giving the newly created Commonwealth Parliament the authority to pass federal voting laws. Section 41 prohibited the Commonwealth parliament from denying federal voting rights to any individual who was entitled to vote in a state election.
Post-federation
1902	The Commonwealth parliament passes the Commonwealth Franchise Act 1902 granting men and women in all states the right to vote in federal elections. The Act denied federal voting rights to every "aboriginal native" of Australia, Asia, Africa, or the Islands of the Pacific (except New Zealand) who did not already have the right to vote in state elections.
1922	Regulations in the Northern Territory excluded Indigenous people from voting. Officials had the power to decide who was Indigenous.
1930-1939	In Queensland, several acts passed in 1930, 1934 and 1939: Clarified that Torres Strait Islanders were also disqualified from voting, along with Aboriginal people.; Additionally restricted voting rights based on racial categories such as "half-caste", "cross breed" and "a preponderance of Aboriginal blood."; The "cross breed" category also restricted the voting rights of some South Sea Islanders who had Indigenous Australian ancestors and/or who lived with Indigenous Australians.
1944	In Western Australia, the Natives (Citizenship Rights) Act 1944 is passed. Indigenous people can apply for citizenship including the right to vote, provided they satisfy all of the following: they have renounced contact with "tribal and native association" for two years (except for their immediate family), they have references from two "reputable citizens" that certify their "good character and industrious habits", they have adopt "the manner and habits of civilised life" and they and are not suffering from "active leprosy, syphilis, granuloma, or yaws". They can lose citizenship if they contract one of the diseases or are convicted of "habitual drunkenness".
1949	The right to vote in federal elections was extended to Indigenous people who had served in the armed forces or were enrolled to vote in state elections.
1957	Under the Northern Territory Welfare Ordinance, almost all Indigenous people in the Northern Territory were declared to be "wards of the state" and denied the vote. In 1961, 17,000 people were wards.
1962	Indigenous people granted the right to vote in federal elections and Northern Territory elections. Enrolment was not compulsory. It was an offence for anyone to use undue influence or bribery to induce Indigenous people to enrol or to refrain from enrolling to vote. Voter education for Aboriginal and Torres Strait Islander people began in the Northern Territory. 1,338 Indigenous Australians enrolled to vote in Northern Territory elections. Western Australia extends voting to Indigenous people.
1967	On 1 February 1966, Queensland extended voting rights to all Indigenous Australians, the last Australian jurisdiction to do so.
1984	The Commonwealth Electoral Act 1983 came into effect, making it compulsory for Aboriginal and Torres Strait Islander people to enrol to vote. It had already been compulsory for other Australians since 1924.

== Colonial and state Indigenous franchise ==
=== New South Wales, Victoria, South Australia and Tasmania ===
The Australian colonies were granted constitutions with elected parliaments from 1855. The constitutions varied, but each created a lower house elected on a broad male franchise and an upper house which was either appointed for life (New South Wales) or elected on a more restricted property franchise. Parliamentary self-government was granted to Tasmania (1 May 1855), South Australia (24 June 1856) New South Wales and Victoria (16 July 1855), Queensland (6 June 1859) and Western Australia in 1890.

Voting rights were eventually granted to all male British subjects over the age of 21. South Australia introduced universal male suffrage for its lower house in 1856, followed by Victoria in 1857, New South Wales (1858), Queensland (1872), Western Australia (1893) and Tasmania (1900). It was acknowledged that Indigenous people were British subjects under the English common law and were entitled to the rights of that status. Accordingly, Indigenous men were not specifically denied the right to vote except by later legislation in Queensland and Western Australia.

Few Aboriginal people, however, were aware of their voting rights. They were not encouraged to enrol to vote and very few participated in elections. Other regulatory barriers often prevented them exercising that right. Between 1858 and 1926, New South Wales disqualified persons receiving aid from "any public charitable institution" from voting, and anyone living in Aboriginal reserves were considered to be receiving aid. Some exceptions were afforded to landholders and "half-caste" Aboriginals. In South Australia, most Indigenous people did not meet the requirement that all voters reside at a particular address for a specified period.

Some Aboriginal people are known to have voted. For example, there was a polling station at Point McLeay, a mission station near the mouth of the Murray River in South Australia. Over 100 Aboriginal people were enrolled in the colony of South Australia, and more than 70 of them voted in the 1896 election.

=== Queensland ===
Queensland gained self-government in 1859, extending voting rights in 1872 to include all British male subjects over the age of 21. Under the Queensland Elections Act (1885), no "aboriginal native of Australia" was entitled to vote. This restriction was extended to Torres Strait Islanders in 1930. On 1 February 1966, Queensland extended voting rights to all Indigenous Australians, the last Australian jurisdiction to do so. (The Queensland Elections Act Amendment Bill 1965 was passed on 17 December 1965. However, the Indigenous voting provisions were enacted on 1 February 1966.)

=== Western Australia ===
Western Australia gained self-government in 1890 and males were entitled to vote if they met a property qualification. The Constitution Act Amendment Act of 1893 removed the property qualification for white male voters but retained it for "Aboriginal natives of Australia, Asia or Africa" and people of mixed descent. The property qualification (ownership of land that was valued at least £100) excluded virtually all such persons from the franchise. In 1962, Western Australia enfranchised Indigenous Australians and those of Asian, African or Pacific Islander descent.

== Commonwealth franchise in the early 20th century ==
=== First Commonwealth election ===
The first election for the Commonwealth Parliament in 1901 was based on the electoral laws at that time of the six colonies, so that those who had the right to vote and to stand for parliament at the state level had the same rights for that election. Aboriginal men had at least a theoretical vote for that election in all States except Queensland and Western Australia. Aboriginal women had the vote in South Australia.

Some Aboriginal people voted for the first Commonwealth parliament; for example, the mission station of Point McLeay, in South Australia, had a polling station since the 1890s and Aboriginal men and women voted there in 1901.

=== Legislative restrictions ===
The Commonwealth Franchise Act 1902 withdrew any Aboriginal voting rights for federal elections, stating: "No aboriginal native of Australia ... shall be entitled to have his name placed on an Electoral Roll unless so entitled under section forty-one of the Constitution". The Act also denied the vote to native people of Asia, Africa and the Pacific Islands except New Zealand.

Section 41 of the Constitution provided that all those entitled to vote in state elections could vote in Commonwealth elections. It is not clear whether that section was intended to be an ongoing provision, or only an interim measure for state electors enrolled at the time of federation. Government officials and the courts, however, tended to give it a narrow interpretation, meaning that Aboriginal people who became eligible to vote in a state after the Commonwealth Franchise Act was passed were denied the right to vote at the federal level.

Many restrictions on voting rights only applied to some people that would, today, be considered Indigenous. Specifically, only people of full Indigenous ancestry or of mixed race "in whom the aboriginal blood preponderates" were limited through the Commonwealth Franchise Act. It did not apply to Indigenous people of mixed race that were, to use the language of the time, "half-caste" or less. In practice, some local electoral officials may have denied enrolment to a broader range of Indigenous people than those formally excluded.

== Expansion to full Aboriginal franchise ==
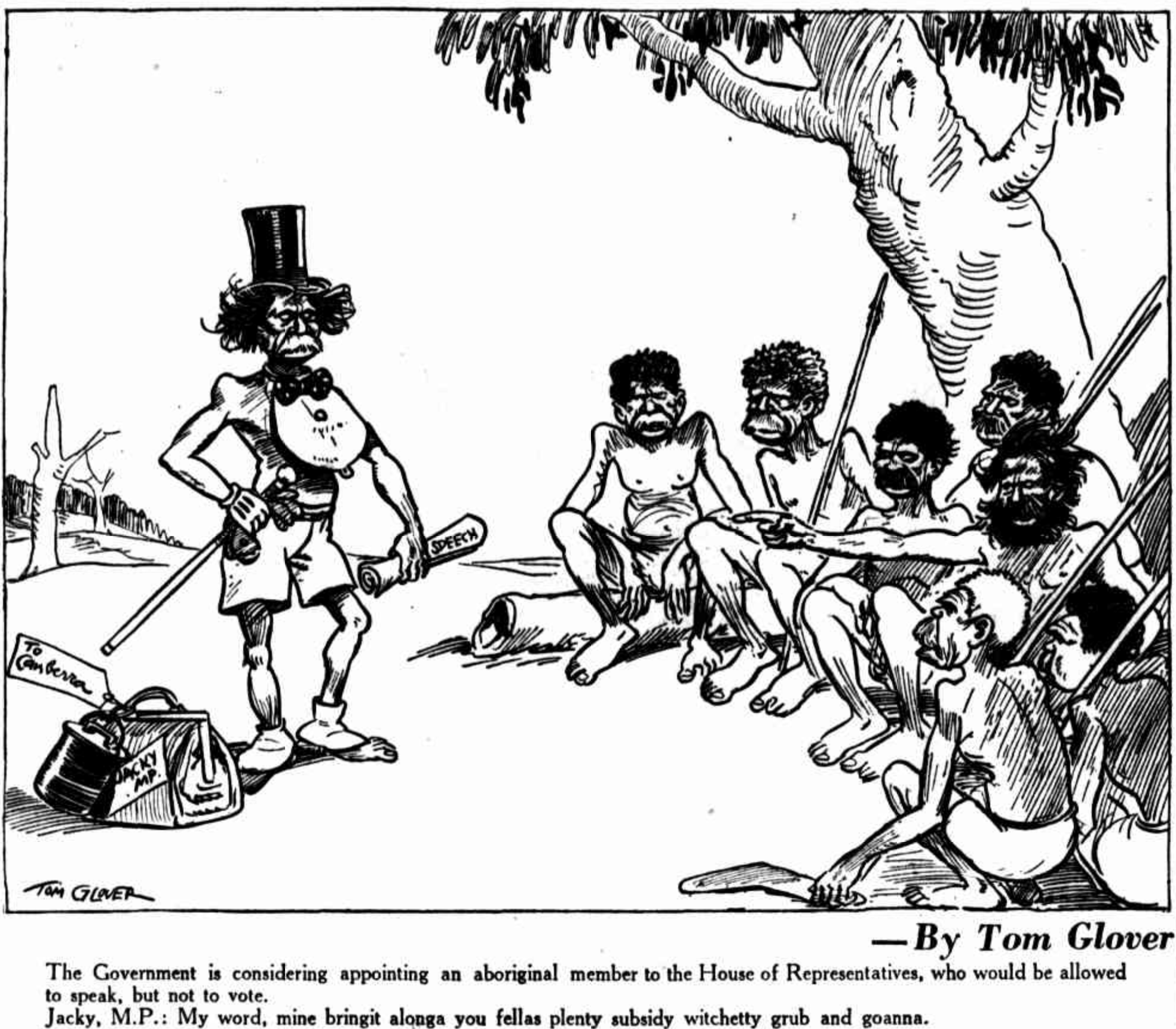
Cartoon by Tom Glover mocking the idea of Indigenous members of parliament, published by Sydney's Sun days before the 1938 Day of Mourning

Campaigns for Indigenous civil rights in Australia gathered momentum from the 1930s. In 1938, with the participation of leading Indigenous activists like Douglas Nicholls, the Australian Aborigines' League and the Aborigines Progressive Association organised a protest "Day of Mourning" to mark the 150th anniversary of the arrival of the First Fleet of British settlers in Australia and launched a campaign for full civil rights for all Aboriginal peoples. The Lyons government's New Deal for Aborigines announced in 1939 promised additional civil rights, including voting rights, as the culmination of a process of cultural assimilation. However, progress was limited; in 1941, Victor Turner, the Chief Electoral Officer, wrote to his departmental head Joseph Carrodus that "no responsible authority would seriously advocate the grant of all political and other rights [...] to aboriginals generally. To do so could only result in utter chaos and the opening of the way to extensive abuses".

In 1949, the Commonwealth Electoral Act 1949 reversed the narrow interpretation of section 41 and confirmed that all those who could vote in their states could vote in federal elections. Also, those who had served in the military were expressly entitled to vote. However, this meant that almost all Indigenous people in Queensland and Western Australia, and those who were not registered to vote in the other states, were still not entitled to vote at the federal level unless they were a current or former member of the defence forces.

In the 1960s, influenced by the strong civil rights movements in the United States and South Africa, many changes in Aboriginal peoples' rights and treatment followed, including removal of restrictions on voting rights. In 1962, the Menzies government amended the Commonwealth Electoral Act to give Indigenous people the right to enrol and vote in Commonwealth elections irrespective of their voting rights at the state level. If they were enrolled, it was compulsory for them to vote as per non-Indigenous citizens. However, enrolment itself was not compulsory.

In 1983, the Electoral Act was amended to remove optional enrolment for Indigenous citizens, and removing any differentiation or distinction based on race in the Australian electoral system.

== See also ==
- Australian Aborigines' League
- Maori voting rights in Australia
- Indigenous Australian self-determination
- Suffrage in Australia

== Sources ==
- Bellanta, Melissa (2013). "Rethinking the 1890s". In Bashford, Alison; Macintyre, Stuart (eds.). The Cambridge History of Australia, Volume 1, Indigenous and Colonial Australia. Cambridge University Press. ISBN 978-1-1070-1153-3.
- Bennett, Scott (2001). "Indigenous voting rights in Australia" (PDF). Australasian Parliamentary Review. 16 (1). Australasian Study of Parliament Group: 16–20. Archived (PDF) from the original on 29 March 2020.
- Curthoys, Ann; Mitchell, Jessie (2013). "The advent of self-government". In Bashford, Alison; Macintyre, Stuart (eds.). The Cambridge History of Australia, Volume 1, Indigenous and Colonial Australia. Cambridge University Press. ISBN 978-1-1070-1153-3.
- Evans, Julie; Grimshaw, Patricia; Philips, David; Swain, Shurlee (2003). Equal subjects, unequal rights: Indigenous peoples in British settler colonies, 1830–1910 (PDF). Manchester University Press. doi:10.7228/manchester/9780719060038.001.0001. ISBN 978-0-71906-003-8. Archived (PDF) from the original on 8 February 2023.
- Hirst, John (2014). Australian History in 7 Questions. Melbourne: Black Inc. ISBN 9781863956703.
- Norberry, Jennifer; Williams, George (2002). "Voters and the Franchise: the Federal Story". Australian Parliamentary Library, Parliament of Australia. Archived from the original on 19 April 2022.
- Phillips, Harry (2013). Electoral Law in the State of Western Australia: An Overview (PDF) (2nd ed.). Perth: Western Australian Electoral Commission. ISBN 9780980417340. Archived (PDF) from the original on 7 August 2024.
- Shaw, A. G. L. (1983). The Story of Australia (5th ed.). London: Faber and Faber. ISBN 0571180744.
- Stephen, Ninian (2000). "Australian Citizenship: Past, Present and Future". Monash University Law Review. 26 (2). Monash University: 333–338. Archived from the original on 16 October 2021 – via Australasian Legal Information Institute.

== Readings ==
- Pat Stretton and Christine Finnimore, "Black Fellow Citizens: Aborigines and the commonwealth Franchise", Australian Historical Studies, vol. 25, no. 101, 1993, pp. 521–35
