= Commonwealth Franchise Act 1902 =

Australian suffrage law

Parliament of Australia
- Long title: An Act to provide for a Uniform Federal Franchise
- Citation: No. 8 of 1902
- Territorial extent: States and territories of Australia
- Assented to: 12 June 1902
- Introduced by: Senator Hon Richard O'Connor (Prot)

Amended by
- 1905, 1906, 1909, 1911

Repealed by
- Commonwealth Electoral Act 1918
- Status: Repealed

The Commonwealth Franchise Act 1902 (No. 8 (Cth)) was an act of the Parliament of Australia which set out who was entitled to vote in Australian federal elections. The act established, in time for the 1903 Australian federal election, suffrage for federal elections for those who were British subjects over 21 years of age who had lived in Australia for six months. The act excluded natives of Australia, Asia, Africa and the Pacific Islands (other than New Zealand) from the federal franchise, unless they were already enrolled to vote in an Australian state. The act gave Australian women the right to vote and stand for parliament at the federal level unless they fell into one of the categories of people excluded from the franchise.

The act was repealed and replaced by the Commonwealth Electoral Act 1918.

== History ==
Before the Federation of Australia in 1901, Australia consisted of six colonies, each with its own voting system and franchise. After federation, the colonies became states with the constitutional power to determine their own voting system and franchise. Women were excluded from the vote in all states except South Australia and Western Australia. In Western Australia, Indigenous Australians, Asians and Africans were excluded from voting unless they met a property qualification. In Queensland, 'Aboriginal natives of Australia, India, China or the South Sea Islands' could not vote unless they met a property qualification.

Sections 8 and 30 of the Constitution of Australia governed how the first federal election in 1901 was to be conducted. It provided that any person who was enrolled and eligible to vote in a State election could also vote in a federal election, whereas this Act defined the franchise for federal elections nationally. The bill was introduced into the Senate by Richard O'Connor, the Vice-President of the Executive Council, and later in the House of Representatives by the Minister for Home Affairs, William Lyne. It is one of the few major pieces of legislation to be introduced in the Senate before the House.

== The act ==
The act originally had only five sections. The main provision was section three, which provided that electors in a federal election were to be naturally born British subjects over twenty-one years of age, male or female, married or single, who had lived in Australia for at least six months, and who were on the electoral roll in any federal electoral division. Therefore, women gained the right to vote in federal elections even if they were not enfranchised in their state.

Section 4 of the act made a range of disqualifications from the general definition in section 3. People who had at any time been convicted of treason could not vote. A person who was under sentence or awaiting sentence for any offence which could be punished by imprisonment for one year or longer (under the law of Australia, or of the United Kingdom, or of any other Dominion of the Empire) was also not allowed to vote. People of "unsound mind" were also disqualified. Indigenous people of Australia, Asia, Africa and the Pacific Islands (excluding New Zealand) were not entitled to enroll to vote in a federal election unless they were already enrolled in a state and met the requirements of Section 41 of the Australian Constitution.

Section 41 of the constitution provides that no adult person with a right to vote at an election for a state parliament can be prevented by any law of the Commonwealth from voting at a federal election. This section was subsequently interpreted narrowly to mean that only those who were enrolled to vote in state elections before the passing of the act had their right to vote protected under this section of the constitution.

Section 44 of the constitution disqualifies a range of people from being elected to the House of Representatives or the Senate, such as any person with an allegiance to a foreign power (such as a citizen of another country), or anyone who is bankrupt or insolvent. However, these people were not prevented from voting by the act.

Section 5 of the act provided that no person could vote more than once at an election.

=== Women's suffrage ===
Women in the four states without female suffrage achieved the right to vote in Commonwealth elections under Section 3 of this act.

The provision on female suffrage was subject to lengthy debate. Some politicians were concerned that allowing women to vote would discriminate in favour of married men, since, in the words of Sir Edward Braddon, "the married man, happy in his family, whose wife's vote is one which he can command… will have two votes." (Note: Commonwealth of Australia, Parliamentary Debates, House of Representatives, 23 April 1902, p11937.) Much of the opposition to the granting of women's suffrage in the act was grounded in the belief that, in the words of William Knox, "the main ambition of a woman's life should be to become the wife of an honourable and honest man." (Note: Commonwealth of Australia, Parliamentary Debates, House of Representatives, 23 April 1902, p11941.) However, there was much support for granting the vote to women, and the bill was approved by large majorities in both houses of parliament.

=== Racial restrictions ===
The Barton government originally intended that Aboriginal Australians should have the right to vote in federal elections, but the proposal met strong opposition in parliament. Senator George Pearce argued that pastoralists in areas with large Indigenous populations could manipulate Indigenous people to vote for particular candidates. Most of the opponents of an Indigenous federal franchise, however, claimed that Aboriginal Australians were not fit to vote in elections or stand for parliament. During the parliamentary debates over the act, King O'Malley said, "An Aboriginal is not as intelligent as a Māori. There is no scientific evidence that he is a human being at all." On the other hand, Richard O'Connor argued that depriving Aboriginal people of the right to vote in their own country would be an act of 'savagery'..

The bill was amended in light of this opposition and the act disqualified natives of Australia, Asia, Africa and the Pacific Islands (except New Zealand Māori) from voting in federal elections, unless they were entitled under section 41 of the constitution. The exclusion of "coloured" immigrants from the franchise was in line with the White Australia policy which had widespread parliamentary and community support. The exception for Māori was supported by parliamentarians on the grounds that Māori were "highly civilised," had the vote in New Zealand, and it would encourage New Zealand to join the Australian Commonwealth.

== Related laws ==
The act established a First-past-the-post voting system, postal voting and absent voting at the federal level. In 1908, a permanent electoral roll was established and in 1911, it became compulsory for all eligible voters to enroll on the electoral roll. Compulsory enrolment led to a large increase in voter turnout, even though voting was still voluntary. From 1912, elections have been held on Saturdays.

== Legacy ==
In 1918, the act was repealed and replaced by the Commonwealth Electoral Act 1918. Many of the present features of the Australian electoral system were introduced after the 1918 Act came in force. Instant-runoff voting was introduced for the House of Representatives in 1918, a block preferential voting system was adopted for the Senate in 1918; compulsory voting was introduced in 1924, and the single transferable vote was introduced for the Senate in 1949. All Indigenous Australians were granted the right to vote at federal elections in 1962. The qualifying voting age was lowered to 18 in 1973.

== See also ==
- Maori voting rights in Australia
- Voting rights of Indigenous Australians

== Bibliography ==
- Macintyre, Stuart (2020). A concise history of Australia (Fifth ed.). Port Melbourne: Cambridge University Press. pp. 158–59. ISBN 9781108728485.
