= Australian Senate estimates =

Parliamentary hearings

Senate estimates are an aspect of the Australian annual budget cycle in which the committees of the Australian Senate hold hearings to examine government expenditure. Hearings take place in committee rooms within Parliament House following the release of the federal budget, typically during May, with supplementary hearings held throughout the rest of the financial year. Estimates hearings feature government ministers and senior public servants being questioned by Senators about any operations or expenditure by any department or agency which receives government funding.

Estimates first took place in September 1970 following the establishment of a Senate standing committees system, with the budget referred to newly established estimates committees. In 1994, this system was changed to merge the functions of the estimates committees into the legislative committees, each covering certain policy areas.

In addition to budget and government scrutiny, the opportunity for opposition senators to challenge government officials has led to estimates hearings becoming known for heated debates and partisan arguments.

== History ==
=== Committee of the whole ===
In 1961, the Senate began examining estimates of proposed expenditure as a committee of the whole, where all senators could ask questions of government ministers as particulars of proposed expenditure were discussed individually. The minister before the committee would often need to consult with advisers and officers sitting off the floor of the Senate, which has been described as a "frustrating" process.

=== Establishment of estimates committees ===
In 1969, the Senate Committee on Standing Orders requested a report on a Standing Committee system from the Clerk of the Australian Senate, James Rowland Odgers. This report featured three sections, and included the recommendation that a proposed system should feature consideration of estimates following the budget, stating:

Following the general Budget debate, the Estimates would be referred to the standing committees, when departmental officers may be called to explain proposed expenditure. The reports of the standing commitees, together with the Hansard record, would be presented to the Senate for information and reference during the floor consideration of the Appropriation Bills. It is thought that this procedure would lead to a more orderly and effective examination of the annual Estimates

— James Rowland Odgers, Report for the Standing Orders Committee on Standing Committees, page 3

The Senate decided upon two motions on 11 June 1970 to enact parts of the proposals from Odgers' report, with a government motion forming seven legislative and general purpose committees and an opposition motion forming five estimates committees. The first appointments to the committees were made on 16 September 1970, convening for the first references of particulars of proposed expenditure the next day.

=== Transition to legislation committees ===
Following a report by the Senate Procedure Committee into the Senate Committee System in June 1994, the committee system was reformed to feature eight pairs of new legislative and references committees for different government portfolios. The report stated that the reforms aimed at "making the committee system more responsive to the composition of the Senate" and to "provide the Senate with a more efficient committee structure." As part of these reforms, responsibilities for examining estimates were absorbed into the legislative committees, leading to the disbandment of estimates committees.

== Procedure ==
Section 26 of the Senate standing orders outlines the estimates process, stating "Annual and additional estimates, contained in the documents presenting the particulars of proposed expenditure and additional expenditure, shall be referred to the legislative and general purpose standing committees for examination and report". As the House of Representatives does not pass the appropriation bills which make up the federal budget until weeks following their introduction, the Senate refers 'Particulars of Certain Proposed Expenditure' documents to the committees allowing for concurrent consideration by the House of Representatives and Senate committees.

=== Public hearings ===
Following the referral of proposed expenditure to the standing committees, committees hear evidence on the estimates publicly from government ministers who sit in the Senate and public service officers, usually secretaries and deputy secretaries (or equivalent) of government departments and agencies. Where a minister sits in the House of Representatives, their portfolio is represented by a Senate counterpart. Senators ask these officials questions regarding items of expenditure and agency operations, with ministers responding where a question relates to political policy matters. Where an official or minister is unable to answer a question during the hearing, it may be taken 'on notice' with an answer to be provided within a certain time-frame following the hearing.

After the initial hearings, supplementary and additional hearings are heard throughout the year to examine additional spending by departments and agencies, as well as to continue to allow for the scrutiny of programs and operations.

Hearings are broadcast live through the Parliament of Australia website, with transcripts later published in Hansard by the Department of Parliamentary Services.

== Reception and notable moments ==
Senate estimates hearings are known for heated debates and partisan conflict resulting from questions posed to senators and public officials, which can result in distraction from the hearings' purposes of ensuring transparency and holding officials accountable. However, the process has been praised for increasing public awareness of processes which aim to hold the government accountable, with clips from hearings often gaining hundreds of thousands of views on social media.

Senators have sometimes used props to argue certain points in estimates hearings. Former Australian Greens leader Richard Di Natale once brought a lump of coral and coal into an Environment and Communications estimates hearing, leading to the suspension of the hearing. In 2014, Senator Bill Heffernan smuggled a fake pipe bomb and sticks of fake dynamite into a hearing with the Commissioner of the Australian Federal Police in order to criticise new Parliament House security arrangements in which certain pass holders were not mandated to go through standard security checks.

Following a question around bee semen importation asked by Senator Sean Edwards to an official of the Department of Agriculture and Water Resources in 2016, Senator Bill Heffernan posed a question on the process of acquiring bee semen, leading to a discussion about the process. In 2023, independent Senator Lidia Thorpe and Assistant Minister for Indigenous Australians Malarndirri McCarthy got into an argument over First Nations funding, resulting in a shouting match between the two over policing and community services for over a minute. The incident led to both Senators later withdrawing their comments.

== See also ==
- Australian federal budget
- Australian Senate committees
