= Clerk of the House of Representatives =

Clerk of the House of Representatives may refer to

- Clerk of the Australian House of Representatives
- Clerk of the New Zealand House of Representatives
- Clerk of the United States House of Representatives
