= Frank Clifton Green =

Frank Green MC CBE

Clerk of the Australian House of Representatives
- In office 23 March 1937 – 25 June 1955
- Preceded by: Ernest Parkes
- Succeeded by: Albert Tregear

Personal details
- Born: 26 June 1890 Mole Creek, Tasmania, Australia
- Died: 12 September 1974 (aged 84) New Town, Tasmania, Australia
- Spouse: Florence Kearney (m. 1914)
- Education: University of Tasmania
- Occupation: Public servant Soldier

Frank Clifton Green (26 June 1890 – 12 September 1974) was an Australian public servant. He served as clerk of the Australian House of Representatives from 1937 to 1955, the longest-serving holder of the position.

== Early life ==
Green was born on 26 June 1890 in Mole Creek, Tasmania. He was the third of five children born to Kate Elizabeth (née Reardon) and Joseph Richard Green; his father was a schoolteacher.

Green attended the state school at Cygnet and completed his secondary education at Queen's College, Hobart (later merged into The Hutchins School). He matriculated to the University of Tasmania in 1908, studying arts and law, but did not complete a degree. Around that time he developed a friendship with future prime minister Joseph Lyons, his cricket and football teammate. In 1909, Green joined the Tasmanian state government's Crown Law Department as a clerk. He transferred to the Parliament of Tasmania in 1911 and was appointed as clerk-assistant to the House of Assembly.

== Military service ==
In 1915, Green enlisted in the Australian Imperial Force (AIF) and joined the 40th Battalion, a Tasmanian unit. He was commissioned as second lieutenant in January 1916 and subsequently saw active service on the Western Front, including at the Battle of Armentières, Battle of Messines and Third Battle of Ypres. He was promoted captain in May 1917 and led troops at the First Battle of Morlancourt in March 1918, before being hospitalised in England.

Green was awarded the Military Cross in the 1918 New Year Honours. He was discharged from the AIF in 1919 and in 1922 published a history of his battalion titled The Fortieth: A Record of the 40th Battalion.

== Parliamentary service ==
In 1921, Green resigned from the Parliament of Tasmania and moved to Melbourne to accept an appointment as clerk of papers in the House of Representatives. He was promoted to clerk of records in 1925 and to clerk assistant in 1927, a relatively rapid promotion that followed the deaths of two Clerks of the House – Walter Gale and John McGregor – in short succession. Green had moved to the new capital Canberra in 1927 as one of the inaugural staff members at the new Parliament House. He was "blessed with a talent for friendship [and] rapidly became popular with a wide array of politicians, bureaucrats, pressmen, and trade union officials".

Green succeeded Ernest Parkes as Clerk of the House on 23 March 1937. During World War II he worked closely with Prime Minister John Curtin, including during secret meetings of parliament, and "protected the interests of enlisting members of his staff". In 1953, Green sued The Canberra Times for libel after it published a story alleging he had illegally caught a trout outside of the designated season. He sought damages of £10,000 (equivalent to $398,000 in 2022) but ultimately settled the suit outside of court.

Green retired as Clerk of the House on 25 June 1955 after a record 18 years of service. His final parliamentary sitting as clerk coincidentally marked the conclusion of the Browne–Fitzpatrick privilege case, which saw parliament gaol two individuals – a newspaper editor and newspaper publisher – for contempt of parliament for the first time in its history. Green opposed their imprisonment and had previously advised the House of Representatives privileges committee that parliamentary privilege should not be used to protect members from defamation outside of parliament, where they could instead pursue civil legal action. In his memoirs he wrote that he had been "dedicated parliamentary democracy against the interests controlling the Executive" but was so disillusioned by the Browne–Fitzpatrick case that he "saw myself as a failure and Parliament as something meaningless, just a 'front' for the dead democracy".

== Personal life ==
In 1914, Green married Florence Agnes Kearney, a distant relative. Their only child Brian Geoffrey Green drowned in the Gungarlin River in 1953 while working as a medical officer for the Snowy Mountains Hydro-Electric Authority.

Green and his wife retired to Hobart, where he served as state president of the RSPCA from 1961 to 1964. He contributed fifteen entries to the Australian Dictionary of Biography and was the inaugural chairman of its Tasmanian working party. He published a memoir titled Servant of the House in 1969.

Green died on 12 September 1974 in New Town, Tasmania, aged 84.
