= John Drayton (disambiguation) =

John Drayton was an attorney and politician.

John Drayton may also refer to:

- Imprisonment of John Drayton, the Australian newspaper editor imprisoned under parliamentary privilege
- John Drayton (MP) for Oxfordshire (UK Parliament constituency) and Gloucestershire
- John Drayton, founder of Drayton Hall
