= Walter Augustus Gale =

Walter Gale CMG
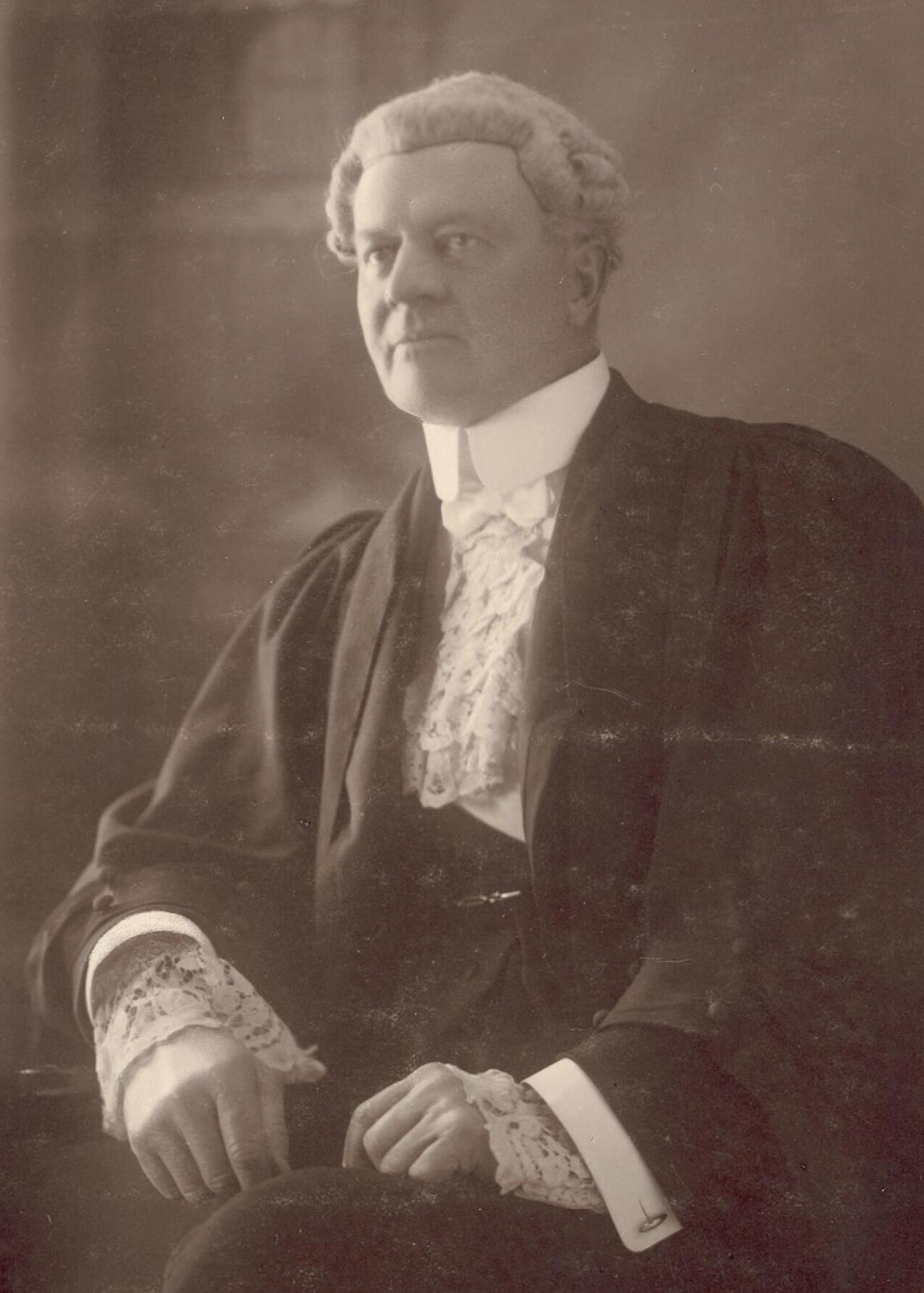

Clerk of the Australian House of Representatives
- In office 1 February 1917 – 27 July 1927
- Preceded by: Charles Gavan Duffy
- Succeeded by: John McGregor

Personal details
- Born: 22 December 1864 Geraldton, Western Australia, Australia
- Died: 27 July 1927 (aged 62) Canberra, Australia
- Spouse: Georgiana Richardson-Bunbury (m. 1896)
- Relations: Charles Gale (brother)
- Education: High School, Perth; St Peter's College, Adelaide; Exeter College, Oxford
- Occupation: Schoolteacher; Public servant

Walter Augustus Gale (22 December 1864 – 27 July 1927) was an Australian public servant. He served as clerk of the Australian House of Representatives from 1917 until his death in 1927. He was the first clerk to serve at the new Parliament House after the parliament moved to Canberra. He had earlier served as the inaugural clerk of the Western Australian Legislative Assembly from 1890 to 1901.

== Early life ==
Gale was born on 22 December 1864 in Geraldton, Western Australia. He was the son of Mary Ann (née Scott) and William Gale. His father was a merchant and collector of customs, while his brother Charles Gale also became a senior public servant.

Gale attended The High School, Perth, and St Peter's College, Adelaide. He moved to England in 1884 to attend Exeter College, Oxford, on a scholarship, but returned to Australia for financial reasons before he could graduate. He briefly taught at the High School and then joined the office of the Colonial Secretary of Western Australia as an assistant registrar. In 1888 he was appointed secretary to the Central Board of Education.

== Parliamentary career ==
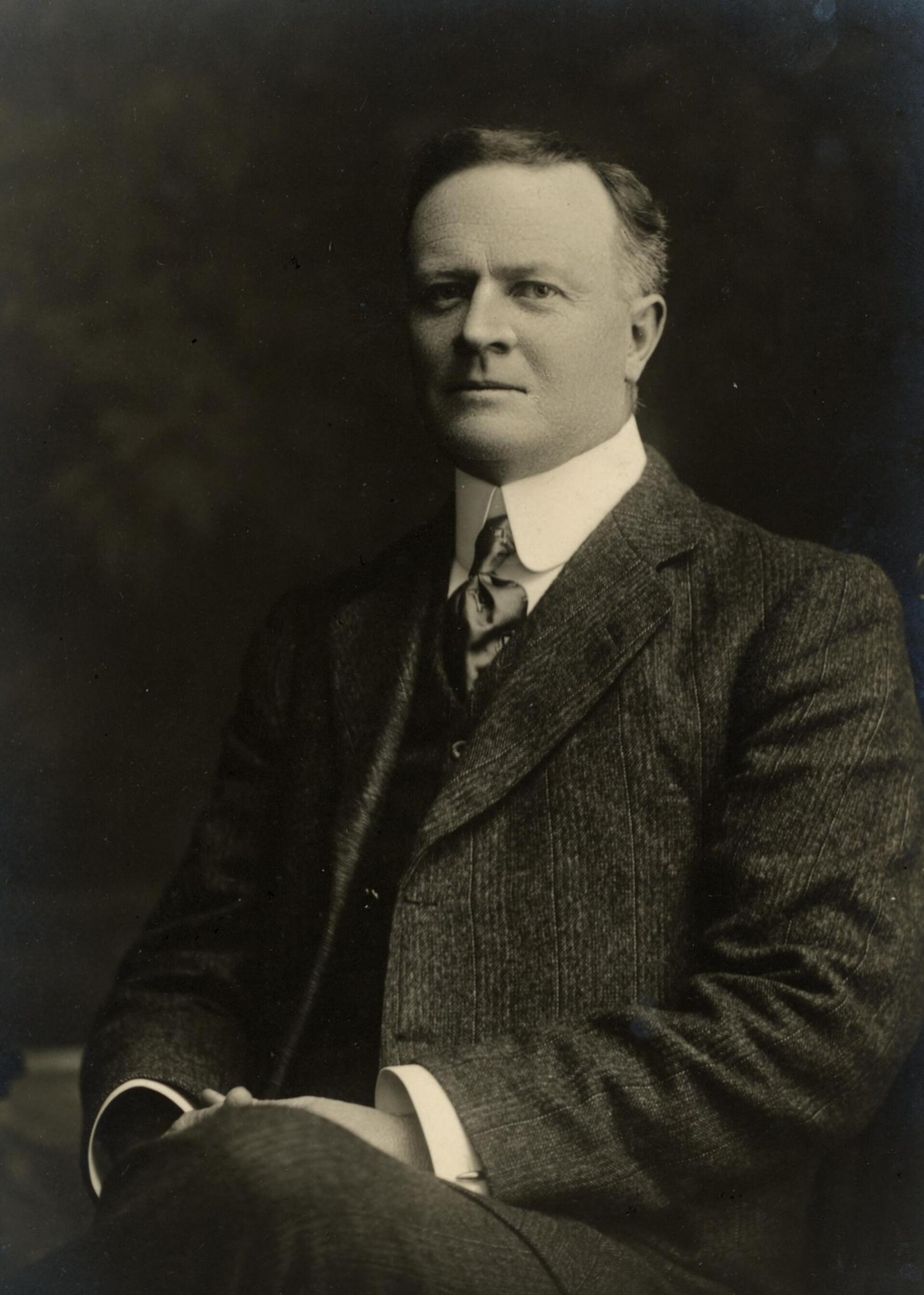
Gale in 1913

In 1891, Gale was appointed as the inaugural clerk of the Western Australian Legislative Assembly, following the 1890 general election. He was also appointed as the parliamentary librarian and was seen as a protégé of John Forrest, the first premier of Western Australia.

After Federation in 1901, Gale moved to Melbourne and was appointed second clerk-assistant to the new Australian House of Representatives, with Forrest's backing. He was soon promoted as clerk-assistant, serving as deputy to Charles Cashel Gavan Duffy. Gale was appointed clerk of the House of Representatives on 1 February 1917. He succeeded Duffy in the role upon his appointment as clerk of the Senate.

Gale secured equality of payment for the House and Senate clerks in 1921 after several years of lobbying. One of his successors Frank Green noted his "patience and tolerance in handling politicians" and he was known for being "scrupulously politically neutral" to the point that he abstained from voting at elections, even after compulsory voting was introduced in 1924. He served as honorary secretary of the Australian branch of the Empire Parliamentary Association and accompanied the Australian delegation to its conference in South Africa in 1926. Following the completion of the Provisional Parliament House, Gale oversaw the move of the House of Representatives to the new capital Canberra in 1927. He and Senate clerk George Monahan were denied any speaking role in the official opening of parliament, as Prime Minister S. M. Bruce considered "they both had the most dreadful voices that we'd ever heard".

Gale was diagnosed with heart disease in the 1920s and suffered a fatal heart attack at his office at Parliament House on 27 July 1927. His successor John McGregor died in office two months later, only hours after a condolence motion had been passed for Gale. Both Gale and McGregor were interred at St John the Baptist Church. A memorial tablet commemorating their service was unveiled in 1928 by Speaker of the House Littleton Groom.

== Personal life ==
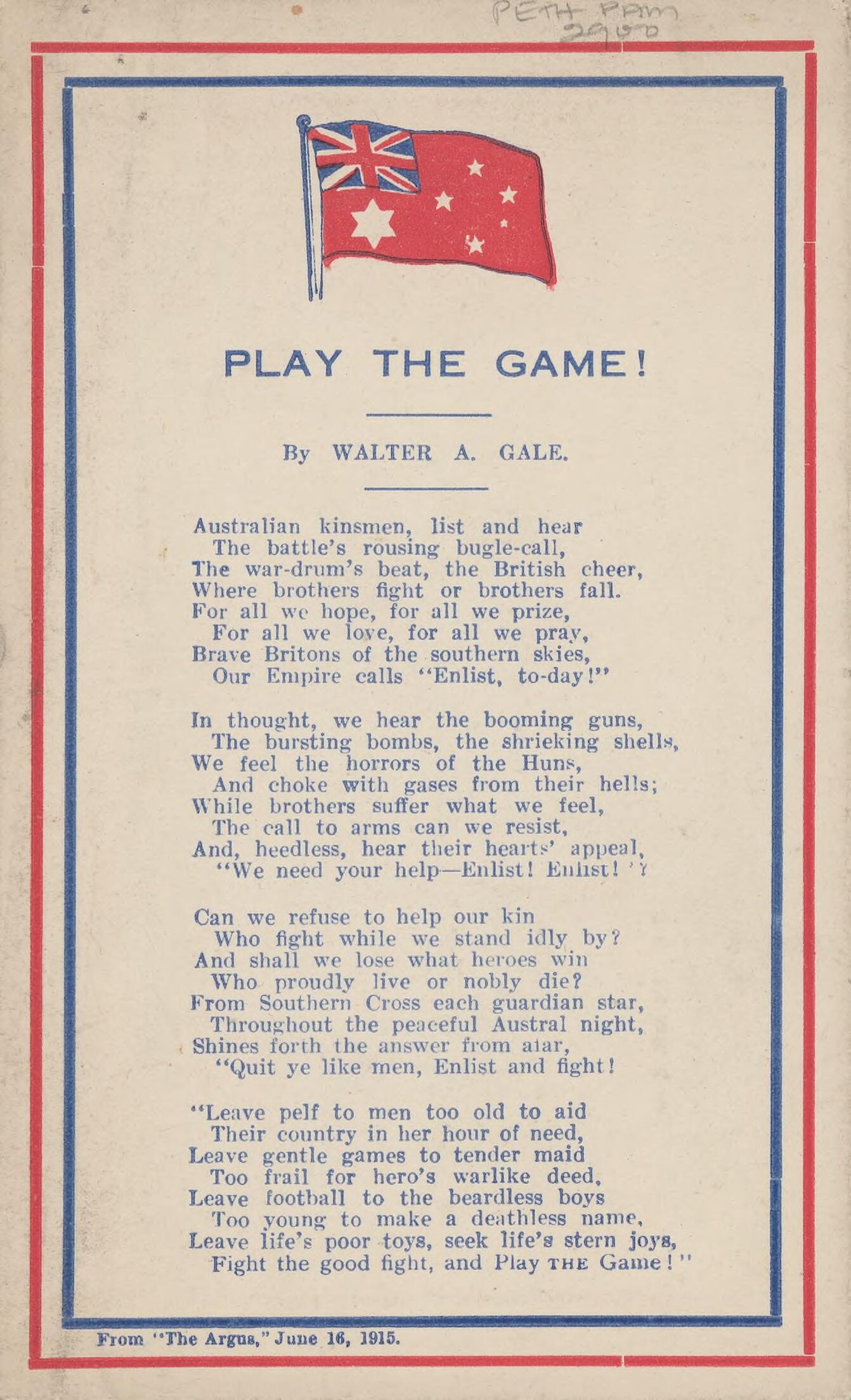
Postcard containing Gale's 1915 poem "Play the Game!"

In 1896, Gale married Georgiana Richardson-Bunbury, with whom he had four children. His wife was the granddaughter of early colonists John and Georgiana Molloy, and their wedding at St George's Cathedral, Perth, was attended by Perth's social elite.

Gale was known as an amateur poet and songwriter. He wrote the words to the "Proclamation Hymn" which was performed at the Proclamation Day celebrations when Western Australia was granted responsible government in 1890. During World War I he published a collection of patriotic verse titled Are We Downhearted? No, No and his 1915 poem "Play the Game!" calling for Australian men to enlist in the military was widely republished including as a postcard.
