= House of Representatives Practice =

Manual of Australian Parliamentary procedure

House of Representatives Practice, 1st Edition
- Fifth edition
- Editor: John Athol Pettifer
- Language: English
- Subject: Australia – Parliament – Rules and practice
- Publisher: Australian Government Publishing Service
- Publication date: 1981
- Publication place: Australia
- Media type: Print
- Pages: 966
- ISBN: 0642048193 Hardback edition
- OCLC: 642031670
- Dewey Decimal: 328.94/05
- LC Class: KU2185 .A98 1981

House of Representatives Practice, 7th Edition
- Editor: David Russell Elder
- Language: English
- Subject: Australia – Parliament – Rules and practice
- Publisher: Department of the House of Representatives
- Publication date: 2018
- Publication place: Australia
- Media type: Print
- Pages: 1018
- ISBN: 978-1-74366-654-8
- OCLC: 1066698397
- Dewey Decimal: 328.94/05
- LC Class: KU2185 (5th ed)

The House of Representatives Practice is an Australian parliamentary authority published by the Australian House of Representatives. The first edition was published in 1981 edited by John Athol Pettifer CBE, Clerk of the Australian House of Representatives from 1976 to 1982.

Currently in its seventh edition, published in 2018, the text is the comprehensive and authoritative guide to the procedure and practice of the Australian House of Representatives. The equivalent guide in the Australian Senate is Odgers' Australian Senate Practice.

== Background ==
The Australian Constitution provides that the houses of the Australian parliament can make rules relating to the conduct of its proceedings "separately or jointly with the other house". Standing Orders were first agreed during the first parliament in 1901 and continued to be used and amended from that time, however, in situations where Standing Orders were silent Erskine May's Parliamentary Practice, and the rules and procedures of the House of Commons served as a guide to the procedures of the House. Over time standing orders became more complete and the organic procedure of the House had developed so that, by the 1970s, Only in matters of privilege was the house referring to Erskine May with any regularity.

In 1975 the Speaker, acting on a recommendation of the House Standing Orders Committee, agreed to the preparation of the publication that became the House of Representatives Practice. It was envisioned, accurately so it turns out, that this book would become the domestic equivalent of Erskine May.

An official book launch for the first edition was held on 10 December 1981 by the Speaker, Mr Billy Snedden, in the presence of the Governor General, Sir Zelman Cowen and the Chief Justice of the High Court, Sir Harry Gibbs.

== Editions ==
Edition	Year	Editor	Assistant Editor(s)
House of Representatives Practice
1st	1981	John Athol Pettifer CBE ("Clerk of the House of Representatives")	Alan Robert Browning ("First Clerk Assistant") and John K. Porter ("Senior Parliamentary Officer (Procedure Office)")
2nd	1989	Alan Robert Browning ("Clerk of the House of Representatives")	Bernard Clive Wright ("Clerk Assistant (Procedure)") and Peter E. Fowler ("Senior Parliamentary Officer (Procedure Office)")
3rd	1997	Lyndal McAlpin Barlin AM ("Clerk of the House of Representatives")	Bernard Clive Wright ("First Clerk Assistant") and Peter E. Fowler ("Senior Parliamentary Officer (Procedure Office)")
4th	2001	Ian Charles Harris AO ("Clerk of the House of Representatives")	Bernard Clive Wright (Deputy Clerk") and Peter E. Fowler ("Senior Parliamentary Officer (Procedure Office)")
5th	2005	Ian Charles Harris AO ("Clerk of the House of Representatives")	Bernard Clive Wright ("Deputy Clerk") and Peter E. Fowler ("Senior Parliamentary Officer (Chamber Research Office)")
6th	2012	Bernard Clive Wright AO ("Clerk of the House of Representatives")	Peter E. Fowler
7th	2018	David Russell Elder ("Clerk of the House of Representatives")	Peter E. Fowler
