= George Jenkins (public servant) =

Australian civil servant (1843–1911)

Sir George Jenkins CMG
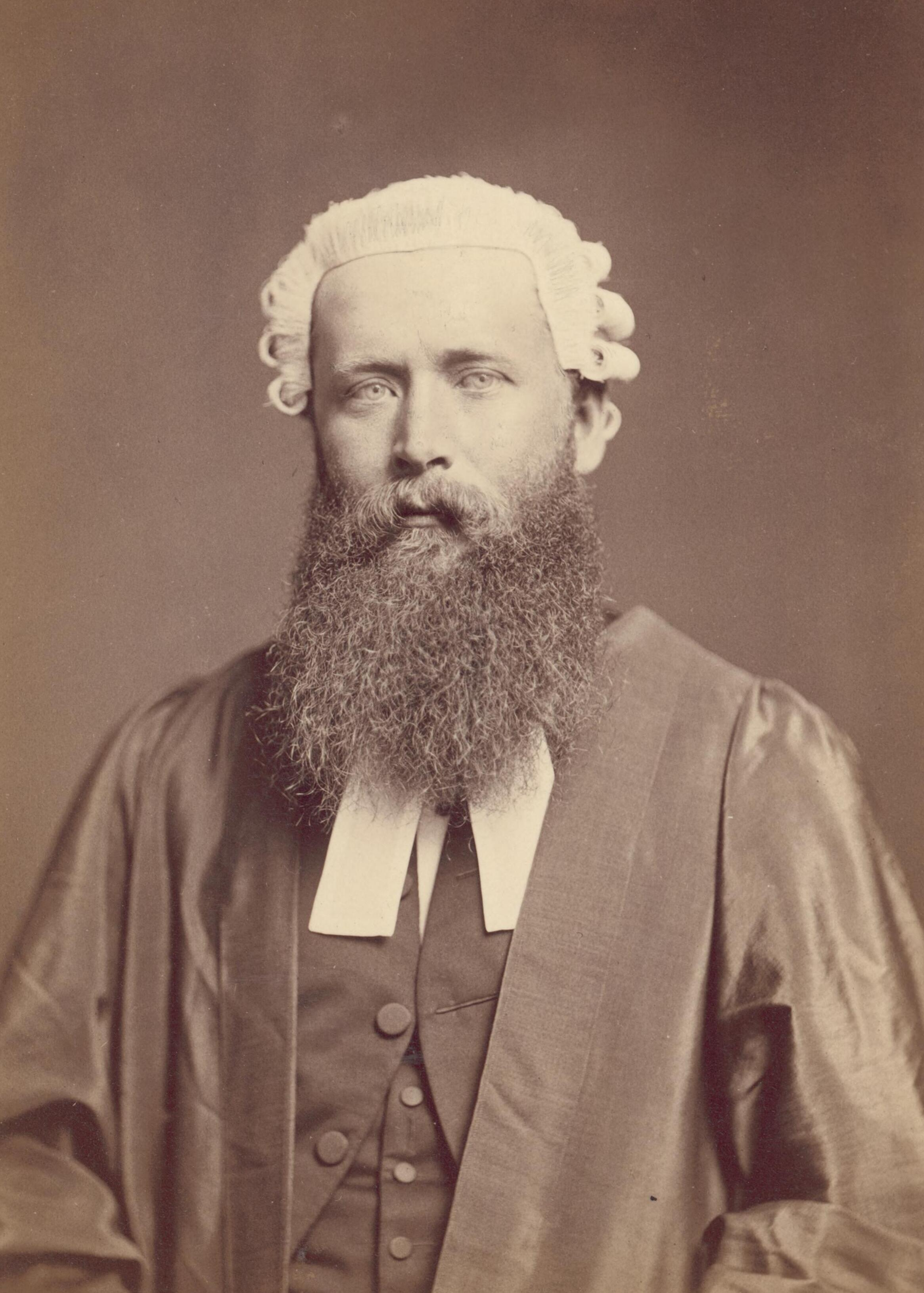
- Jenkins in 1901

Clerk of the Australian House of Representatives
- In office 1 May 1901 – 8 July 1901
- Preceded by: Position established
- Succeeded by: Charles Cashel Gavan Duffy

Personal details
- Born: 21 September 1843 Bedminster, Bristol, England
- Died: 18 July 1911 (aged 67) Colombo, Ceylon
- Spouse: Caroline Kent (m. 1887)
- Relations: Arthur Jenkins (son)
- Education: Melbourne Grammar School

Sir George Henry Jenkins CMG (21 September 1843 – 18 July 1911) was an Australian public servant. He served as a clerk in the Parliament of Victoria from 1882 to 1910. In 1901, following the federation of the Australian colonies, he also acted as the inaugural clerk of the Australian House of Representatives. In that capacity he managed the arrangements for the formal opening and first official sitting of the Parliament of Australia.

== Early life ==
Jenkins was born on 21 September 1843 in Bedminster, Bristol, England. He was the seventh of eight children of Mary (née Osland) and Henry Jenkins. His father, a schoolteacher by profession, was born in Abergavenny, Wales.

Jenkins and his family immigrated to Australia during the Victorian gold rush, arriving in Melbourne in January 1853 where his father worked as a draper. He attended Thomas Fenner's Collegiate School in South Yarra before completing his education at Melbourne Grammar School.

== Career ==
=== Victorian Parliament ===
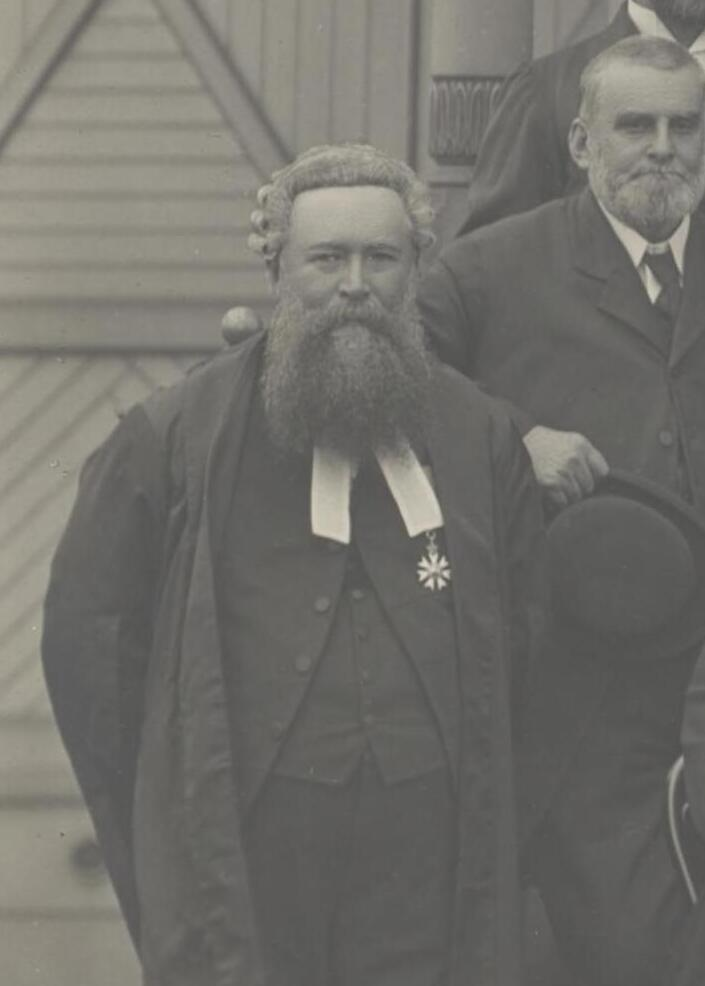
Jenkins at the final meeting of the Federal Council of Australasia in 1899

Jenkins joined the public service in 1861 as a clerk in the Railways Department. In 1865 he transferred to Parliament House, Melbourne, as private secretary and clerk of private bills under long-serving Legislative Assembly speaker Francis Murphy. He was promoted to clerk of committees in 1870 and to clerk-assistant in 1878.

In 1882, Jenkins was appointed clerk of the Legislative Assembly. Following the retirement of the incumbent clerk of the Legislative Council in 1891, he moved chambers and received the additional title of "clerk of parliaments", which was viewed as a promotion. Jenkins ultimately retired from parliament in 1910 after 45 years of service. In the lead-up to the federation of the Australian colonies, he additionally served as clerk of the Federal Council of Australasia and of the Australasian Federation Conference held in Melbourne in 1890.

=== Federal Parliament ===
Following Federation in 1901 and the inaugural federal election, Jenkins was appointed to act as the inaugural clerk of the House of Representatives with effect from 1 April 1901. He took up the role on a temporary basis while on a leave of absence from the Victorian parliament, and likely did not seek a permanent appointment as his salary in Victoria was substantially higher.

Simultaneously with Jenkins' appointment to the House, South Australian clerk of parliaments Edwin Gordon Blackmore was appointed as the inaugural clerk of the Senate. Jenkins was privately critical of Blackmore, who had published several books on parliamentary procedures and openly lobbied for appointment to the new federal parliament. He reportedly described him as someone who "wrote a few useless compilations of Imperial Speaker’s decisions for the sake of notoriety" and the South Australian parliament as having "the same importance as a parish council, no more than the Board of Works".

Jenkins' primary task as acting clerk was to organise the arrangements for the official opening of parliament by Prince George, Duke of Cornwall and York, which took place on 9 May 1901 at the Royal Exhibition Building in Melbourne. His role in organising the proceedings gave him a public profile, with Melbourne's Punch magazine describing him as "probably the happiest, proudest, most important and most worried individual throughout the length and breadth of Australia". He was caricatured alongside the Duke of Cornwall and Prime Minister Edmund Barton in The Bulletin, and appears in the foreground of Tom Roberts' oil painting The Big Picture depicting the opening.

Jenkins also collaborated with Blackmore and Barton in drafting the initial standing orders for the House and Senate, although Blackmore was the primary author. After the official opening, the parliament transferred to Melbourne's Parliament House for its first session, with he and other parliamentary officials seated at the centre table in accordance with Westminster tradition. Jenkins resigned his role as acting clerk on 6 July 1901 to return to the Victorian parliament, and was succeeded by the Senate clerk-assistant Charles Cashel Gavan Duffy. He was the first person to receive a formal vote of thanks from the House of Representatives.

According to an anecdote recounted by federal MP James Hume Cook, Jenkins once interrupted Barton during an early sitting of the House to inform him he had taken delivery of "the finest trout he ever saw in his life". Barton then absented himself from the chamber to oversee the preparation of the trout, which was immediately cooked and eaten for lunch by Jenkins, Barton, Cook and John Forrest in a small room behind the parliamentary library.

=== Honours and assessment ===
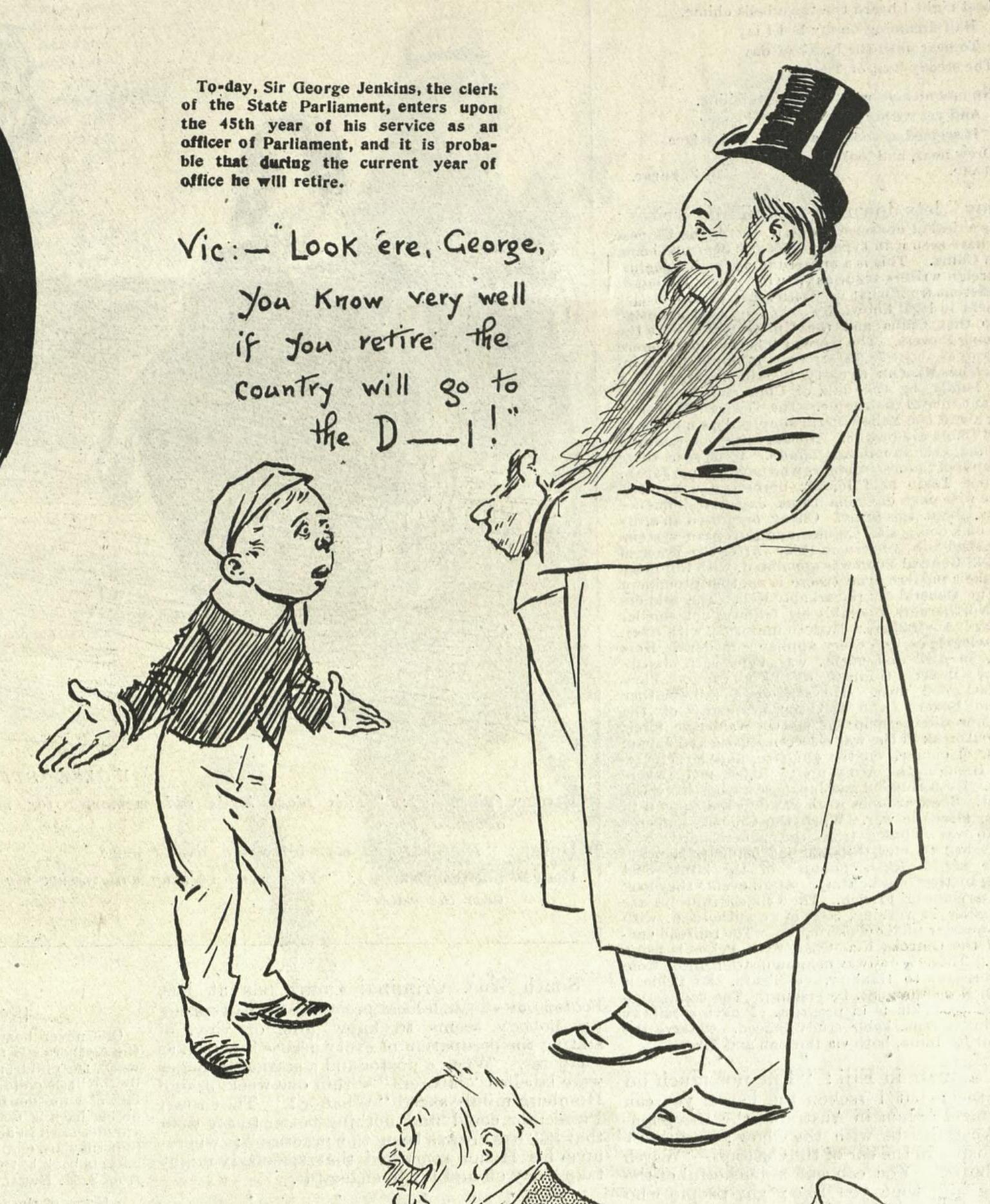
Jenkins as depicted in a 1909 Bulletin cartoon

Jenkins was appointed a Companion of the Order of St Michael and St George (CMG) in 1891 for his services to the Australasian Federation Conference, and in 1904 he was appointed Knight Bachelor. In 1901, he was described by Punch as "probably the best parliamentarian in the Commonwealth". He received parliamentary tributes upon his knighthood, and his obituary in The Argus stated that "few men have been known in official and private circles in Victoria for such a long period".

However, some of Jenkins' contemporaries did not hold him in high esteem. He had a reputation for alcoholism; he was said to interject in parliamentary debates in order to delay the end of the session until he had finished his drink. His subordinate Edward Theodor Hubert kept a detailed diary in which he accused Jenkins of procrastination, incompetence, and misusing parliamentary staff for his personal ends. Raymond Wright, the author of an official history of the Parliament of Victoria published in 1992, concluded that Jenkins was "a lazy, dictatorial, unctuous opportunist".

== Personal life ==
In 1887, Jenkins married Caroline Kent, with whom he had three children. Their son Arthur Jenkins served in the Western Australian Legislative Council.

After his retirement in 1910, Jenkins moved to Ceylon to live with his daughter on a tea plantation near Hatton, hoping the climate would aid his recovery from bronchitis. He died in Colombo on 18 July 1911, aged 67.
