= Arthur Jenkins (Australian politician) =

Australian politician

Member of the Western Australian Legislative Council
- In office 22 May 1908 – 27 March 1917
- Constituency: Metropolitan Province
- In office 13 May 1898 – 21 May 1904
- Constituency: North-East Province

Personal details
- Born: 12 February 1868 South Yarra, Victoria, Australia
- Died: 27 March 1917 (aged 49) Cottesloe, Western Australia, Australia
- Spouse: Annie Burt (m. 1895)
- Relations: George Jenkins (father); Septimus Burt (father-in-law)
- Education: University of Melbourne
- Occupation: Lawyer

Arthur George Jenkins (12 February 1868 – 27 March 1917) was an Australian politician. He was a member of the Western Australian Legislative Council from 1898 to 1904 and from 1908 to his death in 1917.

== Early life ==
Jenkins was born on 12 February 1868 in South Yarra, Victoria. He was one of three children born to Caroline (née Kent) and George Henry Jenkins. His father was a parliamentary clerk who was later knighted for his service as inaugural clerk of the Australian House of Representatives.

Jenkins was educated at Melbourne Grammar School and studied law at the University of Melbourne. He was called to the Victorian Bar in 1889 and moved to the Eastern Goldfields in 1893 during the Western Australian gold rush. He practised as a solicitor on the goldfields for eight years and was mayor of Coolgardie from 1897 to 1898.

== Politics ==
Jenkins was elected to the Western Australian Legislative Council in 1898, representing North-East Province. He was defeated in 1904 but returned to the council in 1908 as a representative of Metropolitan Province, remaining in parliament until his death in 1917.

== Personal life ==
In 1895, Jenkins married Annie Louisa Burt, the daughter of fellow MP Septimus Burt. The couple had one son.

Jenkins died on 27 March 1917 in Cottesloe, Western Australia, aged 49.
