= Frank Browne (journalist) =

Australian journalist

Francis Courtney Browne (9 September 1915 – 14 December 1981) was an Australian journalist. In 1955 case, Browne was jailed by parliament for three months under the doctrine of parliamentary privilege.

== Life and career ==
Frank Browne was born in the Sydney suburb of Coogee to New Zealand-born tailor Courtney Brown and Linda Veronica, née Heckenberg. He attended Christian Brothers' College in Waverley and went on to enter the Royal Military College, having failed to win a bursary for university. In August 1935 he was discharged and described as "temperamentally unsuited to the military profession"; Browne would later claim that he was in fact expelled as a result of an affair with an officer's wife. He also claimed (falsely) to have won a "gold pocket" for sporting excellence.

After leaving the military Browne became a cadet journalist on Smith's Weekly and then travelled to the United States, writing for the Chicago Tribune. He boxed professionally as "Buzz Brown" in the featherweight division. It was later rumoured that he had served with communist forces in the Spanish Civil War in 1937, receiving a Soviet decoration after his wounding, a fact he later refused to confirm or deny. He returned to Sydney in 1938.

Browne, now a greyhound racing correspondent for The Daily Mirror, enlisted in the Citizen Military Forces in January 1942, serving in anti-tank regiments and then with the North Australia Observer Unit as a commissioned lieutenant. He married Marie Katherine Ormston, a musician, on 19 September 1942 at St Mary's Cathedral, and was declared medically unfit for service on 10 February 1943.

Browne then became involved in politics, contesting the 1943 federal election for the United Australia Party against H. V. Evatt in the seat of Barton. He contested the state seat of Bondi in 1944 for the Democratic Party and then Vaucluse in 1947 as an Independent Liberal. A Liberal Party branch president in 1945, his attempt to form a Young Liberals' League was met with disbandment. As a result of these setbacks he grew to dislike most politicians, with the notable exception of Billy Hughes.

In 1946 Browne established a weekly subscriber newspaper, Things I Hear, an often scandalous political gossip publication that John Gorton referred to as "Things I Smear". He infuriated politicians of all parties, despite sometimes providing astute political analysis.

He published a biography of Billy Hughes in 1946, and in 1947 wrote an attack on bureaucracy and the trend towards nationalisation titled The Public Be Damned!. The reviewer for the Sydney Daily Telegraph, Emery Barcs, while praising it as "interesting, amusing and thought-producing", said Browne's "unbalanced and often quite illogical and unreasonable emotionalism" weakened what would otherwise have been an important book.

Browne is best remembered for his involvement in a parliamentary privilege case in 1955. Labor MP Charles Morgan began the affair in May by objecting in parliament to a reference made in the Bankstown Observer (of which Browne was the editor) alleging his involvement in "an immigration racket". The standing committee on parliamentary privilege found Browne and the Observer's owner, Raymond Fitzpatrick, in breach of said privilege, and the two were called before the Bar of the House on 20 June. Before the Bar, Browne spoke passionately about freedom of speech; his address prompted rare bipartisan unity, with Prime Minister Robert Menzies describing it as "an exhibition of unparalleled arrogance and impertinence" and deputy Opposition Leader Arthur Calwell describing Browne as "an arrogant rat". The House voted 55 to 11 that Browne should be imprisoned for three months, and he was sent to Goulburn Gaol. It was the first time anyone had ever been called to the Bar of the lower house, and it was the only time the Parliament has ever jailed anyone.

Browne formed the Australian Party on his release, which enjoyed little success, and in the 1960s wrote a column for the Daily Mirror. He contested the Australian Senate unsuccessfully in 1974, and continued publishing Things I Hear until 1977. In that year he travelled to Rhodesia to work for Ian Smith. He died in the Sydney suburb of Darlinghurst in 1981 of liver cirrhosis and was cremated.

== Books ==
- They Called Him Billy: A Biography of the Rt. Hon. W.M. Hughes, P.C., M.P. (1946)
- The Public Be Damned! (1947)
- Some of It Was Cricket (1965)
