= Browne–Fitzpatrick privilege case, 1955 =

R v Richards; Ex parte Fitzpatrick and Browne
- Court: High Court of Australia
- Full case name: The Queen against Richards; Ex parte Fitzpatrick and Browne
- Argued: 4 November 2015
- Decided: 24 June 1955
- Citations: [1955] HCA 36, (1955) 92 CLR 157

Court membership
- Judges sitting: Dixon CJ, McTiernan, Williams, Webb, Fullagar, Kitto and Taylor JJ.

Case opinions
- (7:0) Section 49 of the Constitution vests the Senate and House of Representatives with the powers, privileges, and immunities held by the House of Commons at the Commonwealth's establishment, absent parliamentary declaration to the contrary. This provision is not restricted by implications arising from the Constitution's general structure or the separation of powers doctrine. A Speaker's warrant, facially consistent with a recognised breach of privilege, is conclusive, even if the breach is described broadly.

R v Richards; Ex parte Fitzpatrick and Browne (1955) 92 CLR 157, was a legal case concerning the right of privilege of the Australian Parliament.

== Background ==
On 3 May 1955, Charles Morgan, Labor member of the House of Representatives for the Division of Reid in New South Wales, informed Parliament that an article appearing in the Bankstown Observer for 28 April 1955 had impugned his personal honour and challenged his fitness to be a Member of Parliament.

In an article headed "M.H.R. and Immigration Racket", it was alleged that Morgan, a lawyer before entering Parliament, had engaged in corrupt schemes involving refugee migration from Europe to Australia before World War II. The Bankstown Observer, a free weekly newspaper distributed throughout areas of suburban Sydney that included the Reid electorate, was owned by Raymond Edward Fitzpatrick, a Bankstown businessman and political rival of Morgan. Morgan ended his speech by moving that the newspaper article be referred to the House of Representatives Standing Committee of Privileges (the "Privileges Committee") for investigation. The House approved the motion.

== Privileges Committee ==
Over the ensuing weeks, the Privileges Committee met on a number of occasions to deal with the matter. Morgan, Fitzpatrick and Frank Browne (the editor of the Bankstown Observer at the time) appeared before the committee and were questioned by its members. The Committee report, presented to the House of Representatives on 8 June 1955, concluded that a breach of privilege had occurred and recommended that the House take appropriate action.

== Called before the Bar of the House ==
The House determined that Browne and Fitzpatrick be required to appear before the Bar of the Chamber on 10 June 1955 to answer the charges brought against them. Having heard statements from both men, the House, on a motion from Prime Minister Robert Menzies, voted 52–16 that Browne and Fitzpatrick be committed to 90 days in jail. The High Court of Australia considered an appeal on 22 and 24 June 1955, but the matter was dismissed. Browne and Fitzpatrick applied to the Privy Council for leave to appeal against the High Court's judgment, but leave was refused. The sentences were served in the Canberra police lock-up (while appeals were pending) and Goulburn Gaol.

It was the first time anyone had ever been called to the Bar of the lower house, and it was the only time the Parliament has ever jailed anyone. Gavin Souter described it as the House using its new mace to swat two blowflies.

== Impact on observers ==
The case left an "indelible impression" on Anthony Mason, junior counsel for Fitzpatrick and later Chief Justice of the High Court of Australia. In a 1996 paper, he wrote "The two men were convicted and imprisoned by Parliament for contempt of Parliament without being given an opportunity to address Parliament on the question of their guilt or innocence. They were convicted in absentia, in the absence of any specification in the warrant of commitment of the nature of the breach of privilege of which they were convicted, and after they were denied representation by counsel who was to appear on their behalf in the Committee of Privileges and in the House. As counsel who was refused leave to appear, my sense of outrage over Parliament's denial of due process and natural justice remains undimmed after a lapse of 40 years".

Frank Clifton Green, the incumbent clerk of the House of Representatives, viewed the case as an abuse of the powers of parliament and had advised the privileges committee that members defamed outside of parliament should seek civil legal action. The day on which the House jailed Browne and Fitzpatrick was coincidentally his final parliamentary sitting day as clerk. In his memoirs he wrote that he was so disillusioned by the outcome that he "saw myself as a failure and Parliament as something meaningless, just a 'front' for the dead democracy".

== Documents released ==
From 1944 until 1987, all meetings of the Privileges Committee were held behind closed doors, and none of the evidence or other material it considered was made public.

In December 2000, the Parliament voted to publish the evidence from the Browne-Fitzpatrick case, and it is now held in the National Archives of Australia.

== See also ==
- Imprisonment of John Drayton

== Sources ==
- Australian Dictionary of Biography, Brown, Francis Courtney
- Moore, Andrew (2012). "The Apostasy of Allan Fraser: The ALP and Civil Liberties in 1955". Labour History. 103 (103): 187–202. doi:10.5263/labourhistory.103.0187.
