= Odgers' Australian Senate Practice =

Odgers' Australian Senate Practice is an Australian parliamentary authority published by the Australian Senate. The first edition was published in 1953 and was created by James Rowland Odgers, then Usher of the Black Rod and Clerk of Committees and later Clerk of the Australian Senate from 1965 to 1979.

Currently in its fourteenth edition, published in 2016, the text is the comprehensive and authoritative guide to the procedure and practice of the Australian Senate. The equivalent guide in the Australian House of Representatives is House of Representatives Practice.

While Australian parliamentary procedure was originally based heavily on the practice in the House of Commons, over time Odgers' manual has come to be recognised as a stand-alone authority of Australian parliamentary practice. In the current edition of Odgers', there are no references to Erskine May, virtually no references to British parliamentary procedures, and references to British law only where it has been explicitly adopted, or is likely to be of persuasive value in Australian courts.

== Editions ==
Edition	Year	Editor
Australian Senate Practice
1st	1953	James Rowland Odgers ("Usher of the Black Rod and Clerk of Committees")
2nd	1959	James Rowland Odgers ("Clerk Assistant")
3rd	1967	James Rowland Odgers ("Clerk of the Senate")
4th	1972	James Rowland Odgers ("Clerk of the Senate")
5th	1976	James Rowland Odgers ("Clerk of the Senate")
Australian Senate Practice by J.R. Odgers
6th	1991	James Rowland Odgers (published following the death of the author by the Royal Australian Institute of Public Administration (ACT Division))
Odgers' Australian Senate Practice
7th	1995	Harry Evans ("Clerk of the Senate")
8th	1997	Harry Evans ("Clerk of the Senate")
9th	1999	Harry Evans ("Clerk of the Senate")
10th	2001	Harry Evans ("Clerk of the Senate")
11th	2004	Harry Evans ("Clerk of the Senate")
12th	2008	Harry Evans ("Clerk of the Senate")
13th	2012	Harry Evans and Rosemary Laing ("Clerk of the Senate")
Odgers' Australian Senate Practice: as revised by Harry Evans
14th	2016	Rosemary Laing ("Clerk of the Senate")
