= Contempt of parliament =

Crime of obstructing the parliament

In countries with a parliamentary system of government, contempt of parliament is the offence of obstructing the legislature in the carrying out of its functions, or in the hindering any legislator in the performance of their duties.

== Typology ==
The concept is common in countries with a parliamentary system in the Westminster model, or which are derived from or influenced by the Westminster model. The offence is known by various other names in jurisdictions in which the legislature is not called "parliament", most notably contempt of Congress in the United States. Actions that may constitute contempt of Parliament include:

- deliberately misleading a house of the legislature, or a legislative committee
- refusing to testify before, or to produce documents to, a house or committee
- attempting to influence a member of the legislature by bribery or threats

In some jurisdictions, a house of the legislature may declare any act to constitute contempt, and this is not subject to judicial review. In others, contempt of parliament is defined by statute; while the legislature makes the initial decision of whether to punish for contempt, the person or organisation in contempt may appeal to the courts. Some jurisdictions consider contempt of parliament to be a criminal offence.

== Australia ==
In the Commonwealth of Australia, the Parliamentary Privileges Act 1987 defines contempt of parliament as:

Conduct (including the use of words)... [which] amounts, or is intended or likely to amount, to an improper interference with the free exercise by a House or committee of its authority or functions, or with the free performance by a member of the member's duties as a member.

Contempt decisions by the House of Representatives or the Senate are subject to review by federal courts. This follows after the Browne–Fitzpatrick privilege case, in which Morgan, Fitzpatrick and Frank Browne were denied legal representation, subsequently convicted, and served 90 days each in jail for publishing an allegedly defamatory article against a member of Parliament.

Punishments are limited under the act to (for individuals) a fine of $5,000 and six months' imprisonment, or (for corporations) a fine of $25,000.

In the Senate, allegations of contempt are heard by the Privileges Committee, which decides whether or not contempt was committed, and if so, what punishment is to be imposed. In practice, there have been very few times when a hearing determined that anyone was in contempt, and on no occasions has anyone been punished beyond a warning, with an apology or other appropriate remedial action.

== Canada ==
=== Federal level ===
The power to find a person in contempt of Parliament stemmed from Section 18 of the Constitution Act, 1867 in which "The privileges, immunities, and powers to be held, enjoyed ... shall not confer any privileges, immunities, or powers exceeding those at the passing of such Act held, enjoyed, and exercised by the Commons House of Parliament of the United Kingdom of Great Britain and Ireland, and by the members thereof."

Regarding the "privileges", there is an important difference between the "individual parliamentary privileges" and "collective parliamentary privileges". This difference is also important in any case of "breach of privilege" as it applies to parliamentary privilege in Canada.

==== Contempt citation cases for individuals ====
Rarely has the Canadian federal parliament invoked its power to find an individual in contempt: There were "contempt citation" cases in 1913, 1976, 2003, 2008 and 2011.

The April 10, 2008, case involved Royal Canadian Mounted Police deputy commissioner Barbara George who was cited for contempt for deliberately misleading a parliamentary committee over an income trust scandal. She was ultimately found in contempt but was not punished further than the motion itself.

The March 2011 contempt citation case involved Conservative MP Bev Oda. While she was found to be prima facie in contempt by the speaker, Oda was not formally held in contempt because Parliament was dissolved before a vote could be held on the matter.

Contempt citation cases for governments

On March 9, 2011, Speaker of the House of Commons of Canada Peter Milliken made two contempt of Parliament rulings: The first found that a Conservative Party cabinet minister, Bev Oda, could possibly be in contempt of Parliament. The second ruling found the Cabinet could possibly be in contempt of Parliament for not meeting Opposition members' requests for details of proposed bills and their cost estimates, an issue which had "been dragging on since the fall of 2010". Milliken ruled that both matters must go to their responsible parliamentary committees and that the committee was required to report its findings to the Speaker by March 21, 2011 – one day before the proposal of the budget.

Concerning the Speaker's first ruling, on March 18, 2011, Opposition members of the committee (who outnumbered the government members) said they still judged Oda to be in contempt of Parliament, despite her testimony that day, but the committee process never proceeded far enough to make a finding as to whether Oda was in contempt.

Concerning the Speaker's second ruling, on March 21, 2011, the committee tabled a report that found the Government of Canada in contempt of Parliament. As such, a motion of no confidence was introduced in the House. On March 25, 2011, Members of Parliament voted on this motion, declaring a lack of confidence by a vote of 156 to 145 and forcing an election. The contempt finding is unique in Canadian history. In a wider context, it is the first time that any government in the 54-member Commonwealth of Nations, either Commonwealth Realm or parliamentary republic, has been found in contempt of Parliament.

Earlier that week, all three opposition parties had indicated that they would oppose the government's budget, with the NDP saying that the Conservatives' concessions did not go far enough, and the Bloc's earlier demands for $5 billion to their home province (including compensation for the 1998 ice storm and a new arena for the Quebec Nordiques) being rejected outright. Though the vote on the budget was never scheduled, a budget is a confidence matter in its own right, so Prime Minister Stephen Harper asked the Governor General to dissolve Parliament.

During the campaign the Conservatives portrayed the "Liberal motion of non-confidence over the contempt-of-Parliament finding" as mischief, instead of focusing on the economy and making constructive proposals for the budget. The Conservatives framed the election as a choice between a stable Conservative majority government or a Liberal coalition backed by the NDP or Bloc Québécois. The resulting election devastated two of the opposition parties who supported the contempt motion, with the Liberals losing more than half their seats to drop to third place in the Commons for the first time, while the Bloc Québécois was nearly wiped out, with both their leaders also personally losing their ridings. The Conservatives gained enough seats to form a majority government, while the New Democratic Party won a record number of seats to form the Official Opposition.

On June 17, 2021, Opposition parties voted to declare the Liberal government in contempt of Parliament for refusing to provide unredacted documents to the House of Commons that could explain the firing of two scientists from Canada's top infectious disease lab in Winnipeg, amid concerns over their ties with Chinese military research. The vote passed 176–150. There were more than 250 pages of records on the matter that had been withheld from MPs. The contempt vote was made possible by a ruling from Speaker Anthony Rota on June 16, 2021, that the Liberal government breached parliamentary privileges by failing to provide documents to the House that would explain the firing of the two scientists. The motion adopted by the Conservatives, Bloc Québécois and NDP censured the Public Health Agency of Canada (PHAC) for failing to produce the requested records. It also ordered PHAC President Iain Stewart to appear before the Commons on June 21, 2021, to be admonished and to produce the confidential documents. The vote to summon Mr. Stewart “before the bar” invokes rare powers of the House. He was required to stand at the “bar,” a brass rod extending across the floor of the House of Commons, to be admonished. The last time an MP was summoned before the bar was 2002, and the last time a private citizen was called before it was 1913, according to the House of Commons’ website.

=== Provincial level ===
At the provincial level, contempt operates in the legislative assemblies in much the same way that it does in the Senate or the House of Commons.

While Section 18 of the Constitution Act, 1867 only grants parliamentary privilege (and therefore contempt powers) to the Senate and the House of Commons, court cases have since clarified that the provinces do have parliamentary privileges. The Supreme Court of Canada, in New Brunswick Broadcasting Co. v. Nova Scotia (Speaker of the House of Assembly), ruled that parliamentary privilege in both the provincial and the federal context is an unwritten convention of the Canadian constitution.

More recent case law more clearly defined what parliamentary privileged means in the Canadian context, with the Supreme Court in Canada (House of Commons) v. Vaid defining parliamentary privilege in part as "the sum of the privileges, immunities and powers enjoyed by the Senate, the House of Commons and provincial legislative assemblies." With case law establishing that provincial legislatures maintain parliamentary privileges, the door is open for a provincial legislature to use contempt of parliament powers.

Most provinces have codified parliamentary privilege, at least in part, such as in British Columbia's Legislative Assembly Privilege Act, or Manitoba's The Legislative Assembly Act, both of which touch on the powers of the legislatures to find people in contempt. Quebec, the only civil law province in Canada, has maintained its "tradition of codification" and has fully set out the privileges of their legislature, The National Assembly, in Division 1 of Chapter 3 of An Act Respecting the National Assembly, and maintains the "power to protect its proceedings against all interference."

== Hong Kong ==
Contempt of the Legislative Council is a criminal offence in Hong Kong under section 17 of the Legislative Council (Powers and Privileges) Ordinance (Cap 382).

== Taiwan ==
In 2024, the Kuomintang (KMT) and the Taiwan People's Party (TPP) in the newly elected parliament proposed an amendment to introduce the concept of contempt of parliament, officially termed "contempt of the legislature" (藐視國會罪). The charge empowers members of the parliament to prosecute individuals who refuse to answer or provide false information when questioned by members of the parliament, with fines & imprisonments and without right to legal counsel free from legislative speaker's permission. The bill also allows mandatory summons to anyone to attend legislature hearings, in addition to governmental and public officials, and are subjected to the controversial clauses too. A motion to charge individual for offenses that are liable for fines requires at least 6 legislators to propose, which would then requires a simple majority in the whole legislature to proceed. Some clauses in these bills are defined vaguely.

Both KMT & TPP allegedly ram through the bill without proper legislative review and procedures, and were widely seen as a power grab for themselves. Judicial Reform Foundation, a Taiwanese NGO focusing on judicial issues, was against this bill because of its vague definitions. The Democratic Progressive Party (DPP) members opposed the amendment because of its vague definitions and a lack of discussion with them. The proposal incited a large fighting in the parliament. Thousands of people gathered to the Legislative Yuan to protest the proposal as well, calling for such bill to undergo review in line with due process.

In spite of public pleas, the controversial bill was passed nonetheless on 28 May 2024 while legal challenges are expected from DPP on unconstitutionality ground. On October 25, the Constitutional Court ruled against the "contempt of the legislature" charge and quashed it.

== United Kingdom ==
Contempt of Parliament consists of interference with parliamentary privilege and of certain acts that obstruct the house and its members in their business. The same rules as apply to the House of Commons apply to the House of Lords mutatis mutandis (i.e. with the necessary modifications). It is further contempt to bribe or attempt to bribe any member (and for any member to accept or solicit a bribe), to disrupt the sittings of the House or a committee wherever it is sitting, to refuse to appear before a committee to testify, to refuse to answer any question put by a committee, to lie to a committee or to refuse to swear an oath (or make a solemn affirmation) when testifying, or to otherwise obstruct the business of the House.

MPs accused of contempt of Parliament may be suspended or expelled, but expulsion is extremely rare; the last MP to be expelled by motion of the House other than for a criminal conviction was Garry Allighan in 1947. They may also be committed to the clock tower of the Palace of Westminster, although this practice has not been used since Charles Bradlaugh was detained in 1880. Since the passage of the Recall of MPs Act 2015, if an MP is convicted of certain crimes or suspended from Parliament for more than 10 days, they may face a recall petition and subsequent by-election.

Strangers (those who are not members of the House) may be committed to prison during the life of the Parliament. The House of Lords has the power to fine as well as to order imprisonment for up to an indefinite term, with the ability to also stop that imprisonment at any time.

In the United Kingdom, it has been alleged that arresting a Member of Parliament in the course of carrying out their duties may constitute contempt of Parliament, although immunity from criminal arrest was removed by the Parliamentary Privilege Acts of the 18th century.

On 4 December 2018, the UK Government was found in contempt of Parliament for the first time in history on a motion passed by MPs by 311 to 293 votes. The vote was triggered by the government failing to lay before Parliament any legal advice on the proposed withdrawal agreement on the terms of the UK's departure from the European Union, after a humble address for a return was unanimously agreed to by the House of Commons on 13 November. The government then agreed to publish the full legal advice for Brexit that was given to the Prime Minister by the Attorney General during negotiations with the European Union. The advice was published the next day.

In June 2023, a former prime minister was found in contempt of Parliament for the first time in history. The Commons Privileges Committee found Boris Johnson had deliberately misled MPs by denying "Partygate" while prime minister. He was also found in contempt for his behaviour following his resignation as prime minister by deliberately misleading the committee, referring to the committee's findings before they were published, and for partaking in a "campaign of abuse" against MPs on the committee. Johnson resigned in response to the report, claiming bias. The report recommended a 90-day suspension had he remained an MP.

== United States ==
Contempt of Congress is the misdemeanor act of obstructing the work of the United States Congress or one of its committees. Historically, the bribery of a U.S. senator or U.S. representative was considered contempt of Congress. In modern times, contempt of Congress has generally applied to the refusal to comply with a subpoena issued by a congressional committee or subcommittee—usually seeking to compel either testimony or the production of requested documents.

== See also ==
- Contempt of court
