= Charles Cashel Gavan Duffy =

Australian public servant (1855–1932)

Charles Gavan Duffy CMG
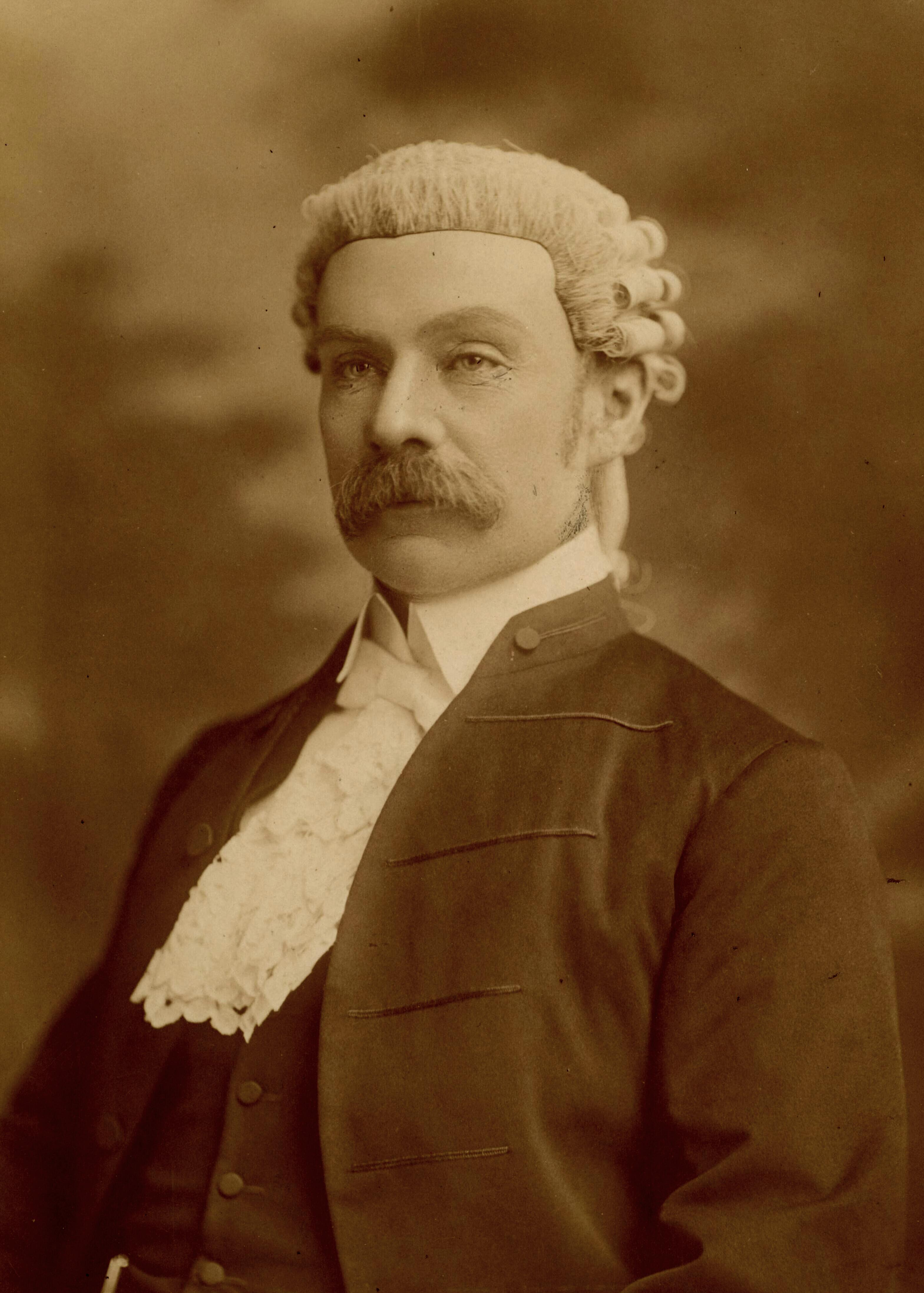
- Gavan Duffy in 1917

Clerk of the Australian Senate
- In office 1 February 1917 – 27 August 1920
- Preceded by: Charles Boydell
- Succeeded by: George Monahan

Clerk of the Australian House of Representatives
- In office 8 July 1901 – 31 January 1917
- Preceded by: George Jenkins (acting)
- Succeeded by: Walter Gale

Personal details
- Born: 27 August 1855 Blackrock, Dublin, Ireland
- Died: 23 February 1932 (aged 76) South Yarra, Victoria, Australia
- Spouse: Ella McLean (m. 1893–1930)
- Relations: Sir Charles Gavan Duffy (father); John Gavan Duffy (half-brother); Sir Frank Gavan Duffy (brother); Louise Gavan Duffy (half-sister); George Gavan Duffy (half-brother)
- Education: University of Melbourne

Charles Cashel Gavan Duffy (27 August 1855 – 23 February 1932) was an Australian public servant. He served as the first permanent clerk of the Australian House of Representatives from 1901 to 1917 and then clerk of the Australian Senate from 1917 to 1920.

== Early life ==
Gavan Duffy was born on 27 August 1855 in Blackrock, Dublin, Ireland. He was the son of Susan (née Hughes) and Charles Gavan Duffy, a prominent Irish politician. His siblings and half-siblings included John, Frank, Louise and George.

Gavan Duffy's parents moved to Australia in 1856, where his father continued his political career and briefly served as premier of Victoria in the early 1870s. He was sent to England in 1865 to attend Stonyhurst, later returning to Australia where he completed his secondary education at St Patrick's College, East Melbourne. He later studied law part-time and graduated Bachelor of Laws from the University of Melbourne in 1880, although he never practised as a lawyer.

== Public service ==
Gavan Duffy joined the colonial public service in 1871 in the Chief Secretary's Office, serving as personal secretary to his father as premier. He remained in the post under his father's three successors as premier, before in 1878 taking up an appointment at the Victorian Legislative Assembly as assistant clerk of committees. He was private secretary to several speakers of the Legislative Assembly.

Gavan Duffy "developed an exceptional knowledge of parliamentary procedure". He was appointed clerk-assistant of the Legislative Assembly in 1891. His publications included Speakers' Rulings 1856–7 to 1893 (1894), a compendium of rulings encompassing debate, petitions, and unparliamentary language, and Index to Resolutions Passed in the Legislative Assembly of Victoria (1898). In the lead-up to the federation of the Australian colonies in 1901, Gavan Duffy acted as assistant-clerk to the 1898 Australasian Federal Convention in Melbourne. He assisted Robert Garran in preparing the final amendments to the final draft of the federal constitution adopted by the convention.

=== Federal Parliament ===
After Federation in 1901, Gavan Duffy was initially appointed as the inaugural clerk-assistant of the Senate, under Edwin Gordon Blackmore. Following the lapse of George Henry Jenkins' interim appointment, he was instead appointed clerk of the Australian House of Representatives on 8 July 1901.

In July 1909, Gavan Duffy announced in parliament the death of Speaker Frederick Holder, who had collapsed in the middle of a parliamentary sitting. Pursuant to the standing orders at the time, he assumed the chair when the House met to elect a new speaker. Due to the heated parliamentary atmosphere following the fusion of the anti-socialist parties, the election of Liberal MP Carty Salmon as Holder's successor took several hours. Gavan Duffy at point exercised a casting vote against an adjournment and came under personal attack. Prime Minister Alfred Deakin subsequently thanked him for "the able manner in which he discharged his duties under extremely trying conditions, which it was impossible for him to foresee, and prepare for".

Gavan Duffy drew up the initial regulations for the Federal Parliamentary Press Gallery which remained in place until reformed by Alan Reid in 1966. He took leave due to illness from 1911 to 1912. In 1915 he served as secretary to the Fisher government's Federal Parliamentary War Committee. He had long sought appointment as clerk of the Australian Senate, based on the colonial convention that the upper house conferred a higher rank. Following several previous applications, in 1917 Gavan Duffy was appointed to the role in place of Charles Boydell. He held the position until his retirement in 1920.

== Personal life ==
In 1893, Gavan Duffy married Ella McLean, the daughter of Victorian politician Allan McLean. Their only child Charles Allan Gavan Duffy was a military surgeon who settled in England.

Gavan Duffy was widowed in 1930 and died on 23 February 1932 at the Ormington Private Hospital in South Yarra, aged 76.
