= Harry Evans (Australian Senate clerk) =

Australian Senate clerk

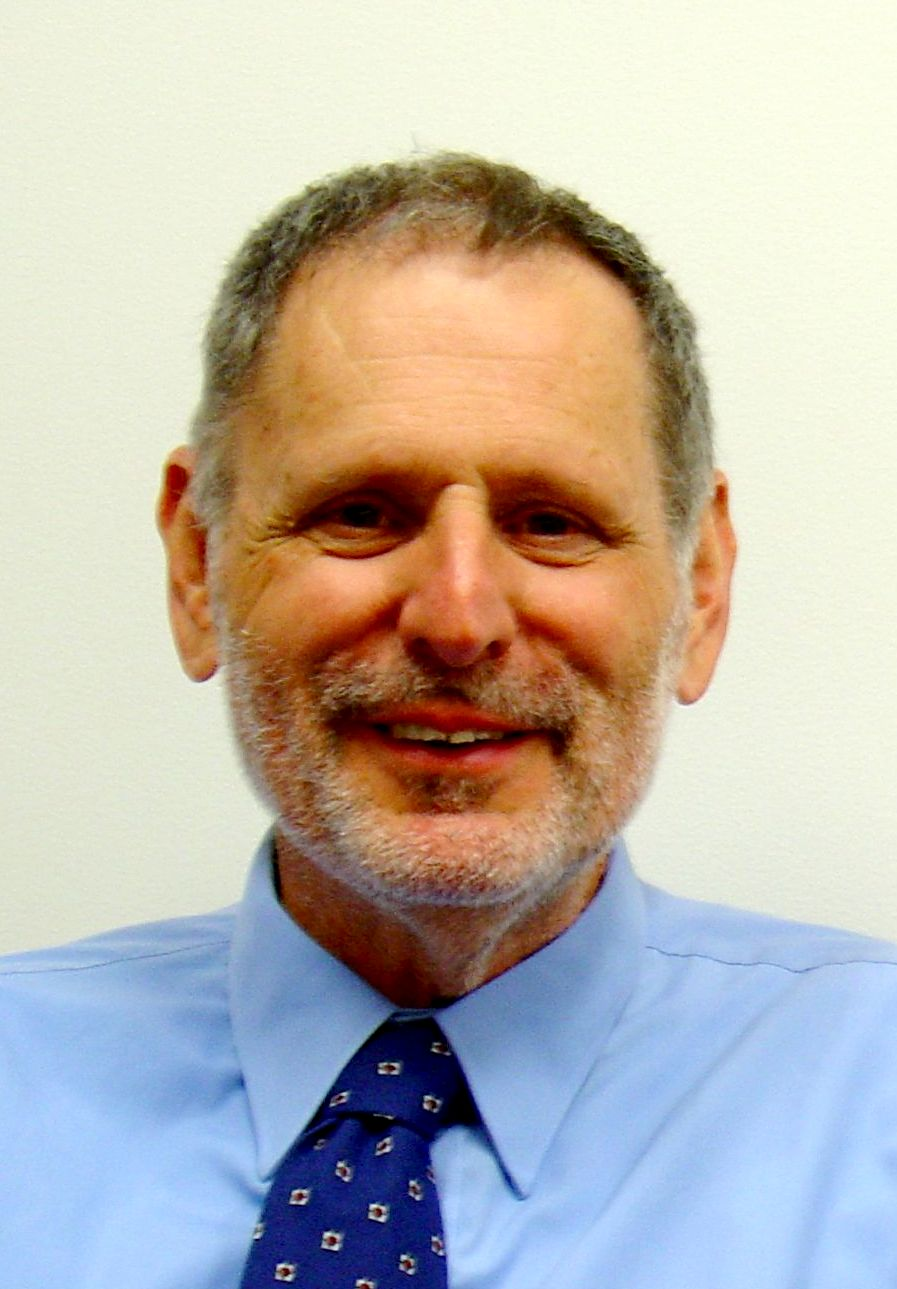

12th Clerk of the Australian Senate
- In office 18 February 1988 – 4 December 2009
- President: Kerry Sibraa; Michael Beahan; Margaret Reid; Paul Calvert; Alan Ferguson; John Hogg
- Deputy: Geraldine Anne Lynch; Rosemary Laing
- Preceded by: Alan Cumming Thom
- Succeeded by: Rosemary Laing

Deputy Clerk of the Australian Senate
- In office 20 February 1987^{1} – 17 February 1988
- President: Kerry Sibraa
- Clerk: Alan Cumming Thom
- Preceded by: Herbert Charles Nicholls
- Succeeded by: Geraldine Anne Lynch

Personal details
- Born: 7 February 1946 Lithgow, New South Wales
- Died: 7 September 2014 (aged 68) Canberra, Australian Capital Territory
- Education: University of Sydney
- Occupation: Parliamentary official
- ^{1} Acting from 29 January 1987.

Harry Evans (7 February 1946 – 7 September 2014) was the longest-serving Clerk of the Australian Senate, serving from 17 February 1988 to 4 December 2009. He was considered an "ardent and outspoken defender" of the independence and constitutional authority of the Senate.

== Early life and background ==
Harry Evans was born on 7 February 1946 in Lithgow, New South Wales. He studied at the University of Sydney, where he graduated with a Bachelor of Arts with Honours. He was a resident of Canberra, and had three children with his wife, Rhonda.

== Australian Senate ==
In 1967, Harry commenced as a librarian-in-training with the Parliamentary Library. By 1969, he had come to the attention of Jim Odgers, Clerk of the Senate, who wanted to bring out a new edition of his Australian Senate Practice. Odgers was looking for a good researcher to work with him on the project. Harry, with his strong interest in history, applied for and got the job.

He was first employed as Deputy Usher of the Black Rod, then became The Usher of the Black Rod, later moving on to become Assistant Clerk in 1983. In 1987 he became Deputy Clerk and, in 1988, achieved the position of Clerk of the Senate.

He became highly regarded as secretary to the Regulations and Ordinances Committee for many years and cut his teeth on executive accountability to the parliament. Upon his leaving in 1981, the committee chair, Victorian Liberal Senator Austin Lewis, said of him: ‘… on behalf of the committee, I wish to pay a special tribute to our former secretary, Mr Harry Evans, who has taken up other duties within the Senate. His vast knowledge, dedication and efficiency have been of inestimable value to the committee. Members of the committee congratulate Mr Evans on his advancement, and look forward to his further progress as an officer of the Senate.’

In the early 1980s, Harry set up what is now the Procedure Office, in response to the emergence of minor parties in the Senate and their needs for procedural advice and legislative drafting support in addition to the requirements of the opposition and the government.

In 1983, the Appropriations and Staffing Committee approved a new departmental structure as a result of the growth of Senate committee work and the emergence of new functions such as procedural support for minor parties. Several positions of Clerk Assistant were created. Harry was one of the first of these new Clerk Assistants, and was responsible for the Committee Office until he returned to the Procedure Office in 1985, before being promoted to Deputy Clerk in 1987 and Clerk of the Senate the following year.

These were the years during which Harry was Senate adviser to the Joint Select Committee on Parliamentary Privilege; was secretary to the two select committees on the conduct of a judge; was the principal critic of the New South Wales Supreme Court decisions in the case of R v Murphy, which provided the immediate catalyst for the Parliamentary Privileges Act 1987; was principal instructor in the drafting of the Parliamentary Privileges Bill; revised and redrafted the standing orders to bring them up to date and to delete archaic, unused and contradictory provisions; was secretary to the Select Committee on Legislation Procedures, which provided the blueprint for the system of referral of bills to committees which commenced in 1990; and initiated the Procedural Information Bulletin, which continues to provide authoritative commentary on unusual procedures with which the Senate abounds. He was also an adviser to the Joint Committee on the New Parliament House.

As Clerk, a small sample of Harry’s achievements include: rewriting Australian Senate Practice as Odgers’ Australian Senate Practice in 1995 and publishing five further editions; devising innovative procedures for senators, including the bills cut-off order and devising many accountability measures such as the contracts order and the codification of procedures for making public interest immunity claims; championing the independence of the Senate and the Senate’s rights under sections 53 and 57 of the Constitution; being a fearless critic of lack of accountability on the part of the executive; leading by example and fostering in the Department of the Senate a culture of excellence in supporting and promoting the work of the Senate; and, importantly, arguing successfully for the abandoning of the old-fashioned wigs and gowns for the clerks.

He is the last Clerk to serve longer than ten years, as term limits were imposed in 1999. As Clerk, he was responsible for advising senators on the procedural operation of the Senate. As a strong defender of the rights of the Senate, including the controversial power to subpoena witnesses, he raised the ire of governments and prime ministers of all persuasions, in particular Paul Keating and John Howard.

Evans has stated on numerous occasions that he believes the Senate works best when it has a "non-government party majority". His reasoning is that the strength of political party discipline prevents most senators exercising a conscience vote and so a government majority means "government control".

== Retirement and death ==
Evans retired in December 2009. He died on 7 September 2014, after a period of illness.

== Legacy ==
In 2017, the 14th edition of Odgers' Australian Senate Practice was given the subtitle 'as revised by Harry Evans', recognising the "substantial contribution of the Senate's longest serving Clerk, the late Harry Evans".

== Bibliography ==
- Evans, Harry (October 1995). "Lessons from Livy". Quadrant. 39 (10): 27–29.
- — (December 1995). "1975 revisited : lost causes and lost remedies". Quadrant. 39 (12): 53–56.
- — (2008). The Senate, accountability and government control (PDF). Canberra: Crawford School of Economics and Government, the Australian National University.

== Sources ==
- Senate Hansard Thursday, 19 November 2009. Page: 8411
