= Charles Frederick Gale =

Australian civil servant (1860–1928)

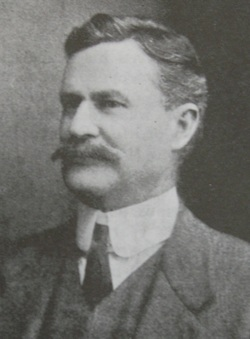
- Born: 26 November 1860
- Died: 24 September 1928 (aged 67)
- Education: Bedford Modern School
- Known for: Chief Protector of Aborigines in Western Australia
- Relatives: Walter Gale (brother)

Charles Frederick Gale (26 November 1860 – 24 September 1928) was a senior Australian civil servant, Chief Inspector of Fisheries in Perth and Chief Protector of Aborigines in Western Australia.

== Biography ==
Charles Frederick Gale was born on 26 November 1860 at Geraldton, Western Australia, the son of William Gale, merchant and collector of customs, and his wife Mary Ann (née Scott). He was educated at Bedford Modern School in England and Hale School in Perth.

Gale was ‘a squatter in the Gascoyne district in the early 1880s, but was ruined by drought and went prospecting’. From 1893 he was Assistant Inspector of Stock at Geraldton and from 1897 Inspector of Pearl-Shell Fisheries at Shark Bay. Two years later ‘he became Chief Inspector of Fisheries at Perth and in 1906 gave the joint select committee on the fishing industry valuable information on the western fishing grounds, gathered while leading a trawling expedition in 1904’.

From 1908, after an amalgamation, Gale was also chief protector of Aboriginals. His first report recommended the establishment of reserve stations which the natives of each tribal district 'could look upon as a home'. Gale suggested that this could be done splitting up some of the large pastoral holdings. He anticipated the 'strong opposition and protestation' of the squatters, but during his term, Moola Bulla, the first Aboriginal cattle-station, was begun. In 1909 he also persuaded pastoralists to ration free of charge Aboriginal indigents on their properties, by pointing out that they were, after all, 'born in the country from which in many instances large profits are yearly made'.

On 22 July 1914, in Melbourne, he married a widow, Flora Marie Farquhar (née Blackman). He then took long service leave in Japan. After ‘resuming work in February 1915, he was retrenched in March, owing to the re-organisation of certain departments'. This was probably due ‘less to differences over policy than to a clash of personalities’. Henry Underwood, the minister, held a low opinion of Gale's 'ability and energy'. The dismissal upset public servants and a select committee of inquiry was appointed on the motion of Gale's friend, Sir Walter Kingsmill. All witnesses attested that Gale's work had been satisfactory and the committee reported that his dismissal was 'illegal'; it recommended reinstatement. This was not done and further intimidatory measures forced him to accept retrenchment.

In 1917-19 he was secretary of the Civil Service Club. Gale was also a committee member of the Western Australian Turf Club and a JP. Childless and survived by his wife, he died of pneumonia, in the Armadale hospital on 24 September 1928.
