= Merit Protection Commissioner =

The Australian Merit Protection Commissioner is an independent statutory office holder providing employment services to the Australian Public Service and the Parliamentary Service. The Commissioner is assisted by staff of the Australian Public Service Commission. The Commissioner is appointed by the Australian Government to review employees’ concerns about matters affecting employment, such as recruitment, discipline (misconduct) and performance management, and also provides recruitment and inquiry services to agencies.
