= Imprisonment of John Drayton =

The imprisonment of John Drayton in 1904 was the first and, until the Browne–Fitzpatrick privilege case, 1955, the only time that an Australian parliament punished somebody under parliamentary privilege provisions.

== Incident ==
The incident arose over the forfeiture and subsequent reinstatement of a gold mining lease. The lease, known as "The Empress of Coolgardie", was owned by the Phoenix Company, which went into liquidation in 1902. The following year a prospector named Daniel Browne applied for forfeiture of the lease on the grounds that it had not been worked properly by the owner. The Phoenix Company responded with the assertion that it was protected from the labour conditions of the lease under the Companies Act, because it was in liquidation. This argument was initially rejected, and the lease forfeited. Eventually, however, the matter came to the attention of the Attorney-General of Western Australia, Sir Walter James, who ruled that the forfeiture was not valid. The lease was then reinstated.

During the incident, John Drayton was the editor of a Kalgoorlie newspaper called the Sun. The Sun's coverage of the incident included allegations that the then minister for mines, Henry Gregory, had "robbed the prospector to reward the capitalist", and was to blame for the reinstatement of the lease.

== Investigation ==
Late in 1904, the Western Australian Legislative Assembly established a select committee to look into the incident. A number of witnesses, including Drayton, were summonsed to appear before the committee on 30 October. On receiving his summons, Drayton reportedly stated that he did not intend to answer it, and accordingly he was not present at the appointed time. After receiving a telephone call from the clerk of the house, Drayton did eventually attend, but refused to be sworn or provide any information, on the grounds that what he had published was hearsay.

When Drayton's refusal to cooperate with the select committee was announced to the Legislative Assembly on 1 November, the Premier of Western Australia, Henry Daglish moved that Drayton be fined £100. Two days later it was discovered that the amount of the fine exceeded limits imposed by the standing orders of the Legislative Assembly, and the fine was reduced to £50.

Drayton responded by writing a letter to the house, claiming to be unable to pay the fine. The assembly then resolved that Drayton be imprisoned either until he paid the fine or until the end of the current parliamentary session. Drayton was taken into custody on 12 November 1904.

=== Release ===
On 8 December, Drayton's imprisonment was raised again in the assembly. Some members were concerned that the incident was being viewed as an attack on the freedom of the press, while others argued that the House had been too hasty in deciding to use its powers in this way. It was then decided that Drayton had been sufficiently punished, and his release was ordered.
