= James Rowland Odgers =

Australian Clerk of the Senate (1914–1985)

James Odgers CB CBE

Clerk of the Australian Senate
- In office 16 August 1965 – 8 August 1979
- Preceded by: Rupert Loof
- Succeeded by: Roy Bullock

Personal details
- Born: 9 August 1914 Adelaide, Australia
- Died: 30 July 1985 (aged 70) Canberra, Australia
- Spouse: Helen Horner (m. 1939)

James Rowland Odgers (1914–1985) served as the Clerk of the Australian Senate from 1965 to 1979, and is described in the Australian Dictionary of Biography as "arguably the Senate's most influential clerk". As Clerk, he was a noted reformer and revolutionised the operation of the parliament by establishing a system of Senate committees based on the American Senate. Odgers continues to influence the operation of the Senate through his book, Odgers' Australian Senate Practice, considered to be the definitive guide to practice and procedure.

== Reform work ==
In 1955, Odgers traveled to the United States on a travel grant to study the operations of the United States Senate. At the time, the Australian Senate had little power and was seen as largely a rubber stamp for the decisions of the Australian House of Representatives. Odgers's subsequent report recommended establishing US-style standing committees to examine the work of the government and private service. Odgers embarked on a tireless campaign to implement the changes and his determination was rewarded in 1970 when Odgers was tasked with establishing a system of Senate committees.

The new implemented system created ongoing rather than ad hoc committees and revolutionised the operation of the parliament. The Senate also began investigating government spending and public administration, and sought community input on how to improve policy and legislative outcomes.

== Creation of the Australian Senate Practice ==
Odgers joined the Department of the Senate in 1942 and, while still a junior officer, began writing a manual for Senate practice. Largely self-educated, Odgers spent years compiling his manual, recounting: "The research for the first edition was quite horrendous. I spent every lunchtime for years...in the Senate Chamber going through every ruling that had ever been made from 1901."

Keeping the manual current became his life's work and Odgers completed the sixth edition just prior to this death in 1985. Since the seventh edition published in 1995, the manual, Odgers' Australian Senate Practice, has been named in his honour and continues to be updated by the Clerk of the Senate.
