= Australian parliamentary department =

In Australia, there are four parliamentary departments that provide advice and support to both Houses of the Australian Parliament, their members, committees as well as services to Parliament House, including visitors. The parliamentary departments operate under the Parliamentary Service Act 1999 and report only to one or both of the presiding officers of the Australian Parliament — the President of the Senate and the Speaker of the House of Representatives — who in turn are responsible for the departments to their respective house of parliament. Employees of these departments constitute the Australian Parliamentary Service, which is not part of the Australian Public Service. The parliamentary departments are independent of the Australian Government, though the Merit Protection Commissioner provides employment services to both services on an equivalent basis.

== Australian parliamentary departments ==
The parliamentary departments are:

=== Department of Parliamentary Services ===
Department of Parliamentary Services
Agency overview
- Jurisdiction: Australia
- Headquarters: Canberra, Australia
- Agency executive: Secretary

The Department of Parliamentary Services (DPS) provides advice and various facilities and services for the Australian Parliament and members of parliament, including:

- library and research.
- information and communication technology.
- security.
- building, ground and design integrity.
- audio visual and Hansard.
- art services.
- visitor services.
- retail, health, banking, and childcare, and
- corporate, administrative and strategic services for DPS.

The head of the DPS is called Secretary, currently Ms Jaala Hinchcliffe, who reports to both the President of the Senate and the Speaker of the House of Representatives.

=== Department of the Senate ===
The Department of the Senate helps run the Australian Senate. The Clerk of the Senate, who since 9 March 2017 has been Richard Pye, is responsible for managing the department to the President of the Senate who in turn is responsible for the department to the Senate.

=== Department of the House of Representatives ===
The Department of the House of Representatives provides advice and support to the various parts of the Australian House of Representatives. The Clerk of the House of Representatives is responsible for managing the department to the Speaker of the House of Representatives who in turn is responsible for the department to the House. As at 30 June 2014, the department had a staff of 176.

=== Parliamentary Budget Office ===
The Parliamentary Budget Office (PBO) was formed to "inform the parliament by providing independent and non-partisan analysis of the budget cycle, fiscal policy and the financial implications of proposals".

== See also ==
- Australian Public Service
- Merit Protection Commissioner
