= Clerk of the Australian Senate =

The Clerk of the Australian Senate is the head of the Parliamentary Department of the Senate, which is the parliamentary department supporting the work of the Australian Senate. The Clerk is responsible to the President of the Senate who in turn is responsible for the department to the Senate. The Department of the Senate is not part of the Executive Government of Australia. The current Clerk is Richard Pye. The Deputy Clerk of the Senate is Jackie Morris. Since 1999, the terms of the Clerk of the Senate, as that of the Clerk of the House of Representatives, have been limited to 10 years. The change did not apply to the incumbents.

The Department of the Senate provides advice and support to the Senate, its committees, the President of the Senate and senators. The Clerk is directly responsible for:

- provision of procedural and constitutional advice to senators in respect of the operations of the Senate and its committees.
- provision of secretariat, advisory and administrative support to the Procedure Committee and the Committee of Privileges.
- production, amendment and updating of Odgers' Australian Senate Practice.
- production and dissemination of material relating to the work of the Senate and its committees to the widest possible audience.
- corporate leadership of the Department of the Senate.
- secretariat services for the Inter-Parliamentary Union.

In addition, the office exercises overall responsibility for, and quality control of, all procedural and administrative activities of the department.

== Clerks of the Senate ==
| No. | Name | Term in Office |
|---|---|---|
| 1 | Edwin Gordon Blackmore CMG | 1 April 1901 – 30 June 1908 |
| 2 | Charles Broughton Boydell | 1 July 1908 – 31 December 1916 |
| 3 | Charles Cashel Gavan Duffy CMG | 1 February 1917 – 27 August 1920 |
| 4 | George Henry Monahan CMG | 28 August 1920 – 31 December 1938 |
| 5 | Robert Arthur Broinowski | 1 January 1939 – 30 November 1942 |
| 6 | John Ernest Edwards | 1 December 1942 – 20 July 1955 |
| 7 | Rupert Harry Colin Loof CBE | 21 July 1955 – 14 August 1965 |
| 8 | James Rowland Odgers CBE | 16 August 1965 – 8 August 1979 |
| 9 | Roy Edwards Bullock OBE | 9 August 1979 – 15 July 1981 |
| 10 | Keith Oscar Bradshaw | 29 October 1980 – 15 July 1982 |
| 11 | Alan Ritchie Cumming Thom | 16 July 1982 – 15 February 1988 |
| 12 | Harry Evans | 17 February 1988 – 4 December 2009 |
| 13 | Dr Rosemary Laing | 5 December 2009 – 8 March 2017 |
| 14 | Richard Pye | 9 March 2017 – |

The longest-serving Clerk was Harry Evans, who served 21 years, from 1988 to 2009.

== See also ==
- Clerk of the Australian House of Representatives
