= Clerk of the Australian House of Representatives =

Responsible for managing the Parliamentary Department of the House of Representatives

The Clerk of the House of Representatives of the Parliament of Australia is responsible for managing the Parliamentary Department of the House of Representatives. The Clerk is a non-elected administrative officer under the Parliamentary Service Act 1999. The term of the Clerk of the House of Representatives is now limited by law to 10 years. On 12 August 2019, Claressa Surtees became the first female Clerk of the House.

The Department of the House of Representatives provides services to support the efficient conduct of the House of Representatives, its committees and certain joint committees as well as a range of services and facilities for House Members in the Australian Parliament House in Canberra, Australian Capital Territory. The department also undertakes activities to promote the work of the House in the community and is responsible for the conduct of the Parliament's international and regional relations. The Clerk of the Australian House of Representatives conducts the election for Speaker.

The Department of the House of Representatives is not part of the Executive Government of Australia, being instead responsible to the Speaker of the Australian House of Representatives, who has accountability obligations for the department to the House of Representatives.

Since 1999, the terms of the Clerk of the House of Representatives and the Clerk of the Senate have been limited to 10 years. The change did not apply to the incumbents.

== Clerks of the House ==
There have been 16 Clerks of the House. The longest-serving was Frank Green, who held the position for over 18 years. The shortest-serving was John McGregor, who held the position for 27 days. He collapsed while the House was speaking on a condolence motion for his predecessor Walter Gale, who had died in office a month earlier. McGregor was taken to Canberra Hospital where he died.

George Henry Jenkins, the clerk of the Victorian Legislative Assembly, was seconded to the Federal Parliament for its first few months and acted as Clerk of the House during that time before the position was filled permanently.

| # | Clerk | Term start | Term end | Duration |
|---|---|---|---|---|
| – | Sir George Henry Jenkins CMG (acting) | 1 May 1901 | 6 July 1901 | 66 days |
| 1 | Charles Cashel Gavan Duffy CMG | 8 July 1901 | 31 January 1917 | 15 years, 207 days |
| 2 | Walter Augustus Gale CMG | 1 February 1917 | 27 July 1927 | 10 years, 176 days |
| 3 | John Robert McGregor | 1 September 1927 | 28 September 1927 | 27 days |
| 4 | Ernest William Parkes CMG | 27 October 1927 | 22 March 1937 | 9 years, 146 days |
| 5 | Frank Clifton Green CBE MC | 23 March 1937 | 25 June 1955 | 18 years, 94 days |
| 6 | Albert Allan Tregear CBE | 27 June 1955 | 31 December 1958 | 3 years, 187 days |
| 7 | Sir Alan George Turner CBE | 1 January 1959 | 10 December 1971 | 12 years, 343 days |
| 8 | Norman James Parkes CBE | 11 December 1971 | 31 December 1976 | 5 years, 20 days |
| 9 | John Athol Pettifer CBE | 1 January 1977 | 15 July 1982 | 5 years, 195 days |
| 10 | Douglas Maurice Blake AM VRD | 16 July 1982 | 30 July 1985 | 3 years, 14 days |
| 11 | Alan Robert Browning | 31 July 1985 | 22 March 1991 | 5 years, 234 days |
| 12 | Lyndal McAlpin Barlin AM | 23 March 1991 | 26 July 1997 | 6 years, 125 days |
| 13 | Ian Charles Harris AO | 27 July 1997 | 4 December 2009 | 12 years, 130 days |
| 14 | Bernard Clive Wright AO | 4 December 2009 | 31 December 2013 | 4 years, 27 days |
| 15 | David Russell Elder | 1 January 2014 | 9 August 2019 | 5 years, 220 days |
| 16 | Claressa Anne Surtees | 12 August 2019 | Incumbent | 6 years, 335 days |

== See also ==
- Clerk of the Australian Senate
